= Education in Toronto =

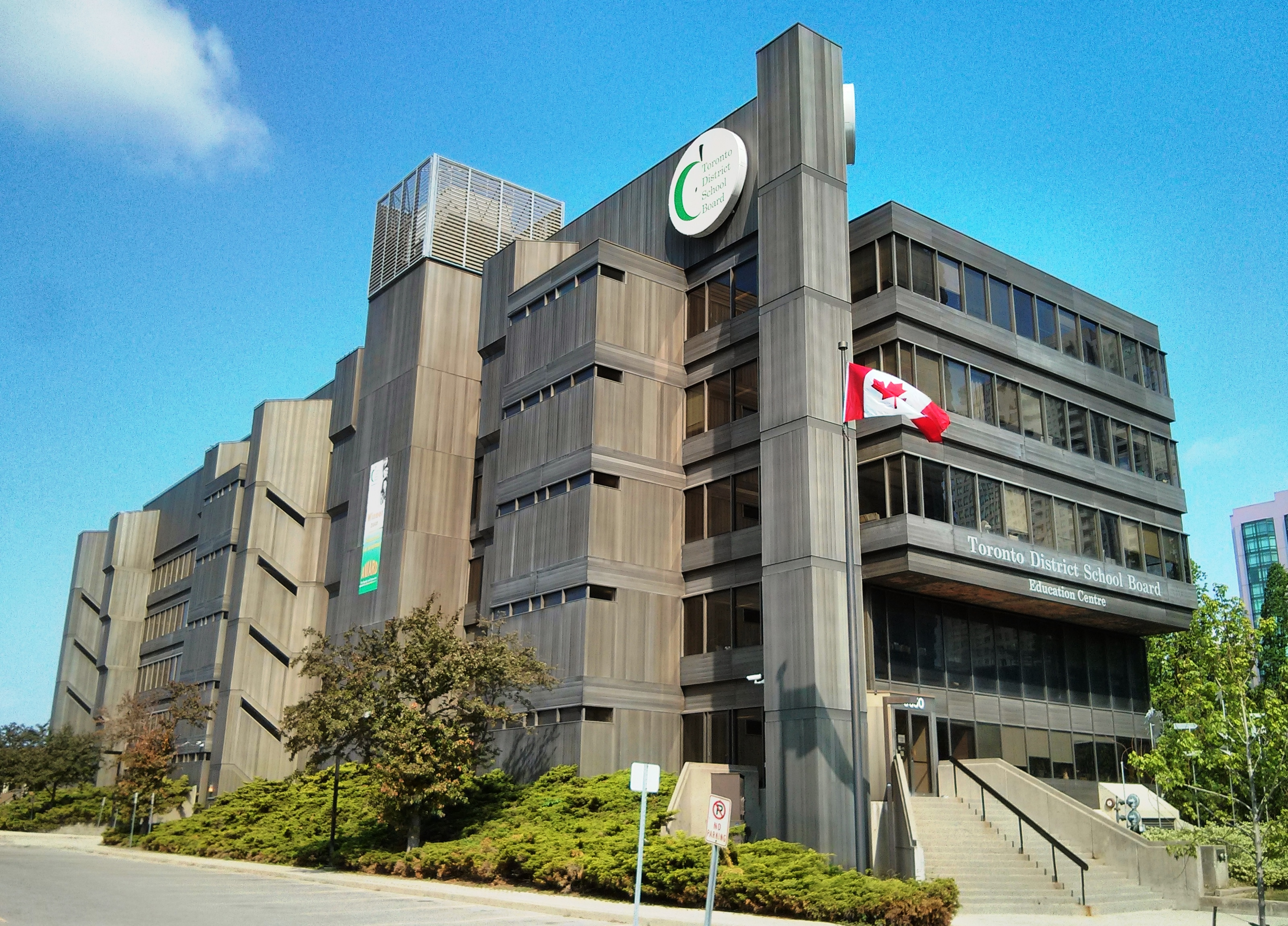
The headquarters for Toronto District School Board, the largest school board in Canada.

Education in Toronto is primarily provided publicly and is overseen by Ontario's Ministry of Education. The city is home to a number of elementary, secondary, and post-secondary institutions. In addition to those institutions, the city is also home to several specialty and supplementary schools, which provide schooling for specific crafts or are intended to provide additional educational support.

Four publicly funded school boards provide elementary and secondary schooling to residents of the city, from Junior Kindergarten to Grade 12. The four school boards operate as either English or French first language school boards, and as either secular or separate Catholic school boards. In addition to publicly funded schools, elementary and secondary education is also provided by private religious school boards, independent religious schools, or independent secular institutions, such as college-preparatory schools.

Toronto is also home to several post-secondary institutions. There are seven universities in Toronto with degree-granting authority, five of which are public university, while the other two are private. In addition, there are four degree- and diploma-granting colleges based in the city. Additionally, two post-secondary institutions based elsewhere in Ontario have also established satellite campuses in the city. Other forms of post-secondary institutions in Toronto include private vocational schools.

== Elementary and secondary education ==
=== Public education ===
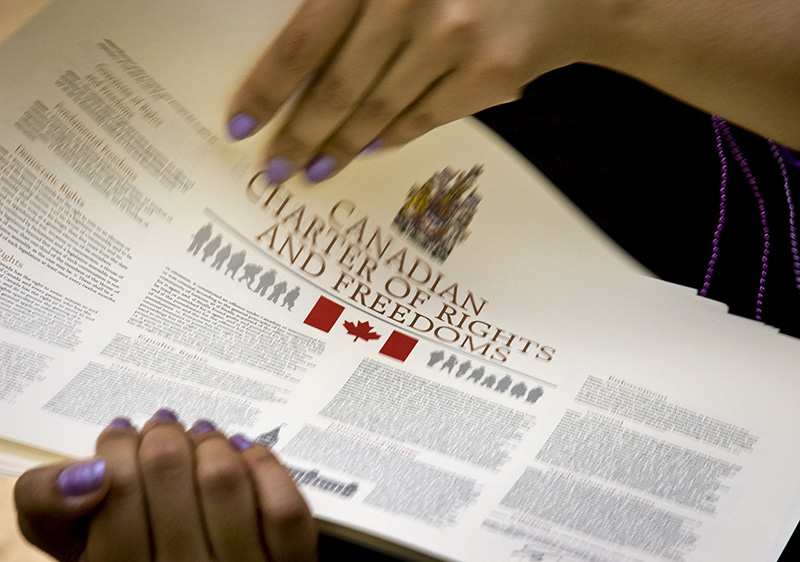
The Canadian Charter of Rights and Freedoms includes provisions that guarantee English and French language schools, and reaffirms the rights of separate schools in Ontario.

Four school boards in Toronto provide public elementary, secondary, and adult education. The four school boards operate as either English or French first language school boards, and as either secular or separate school boards.

The number of school boards based in Toronto and the kinds of institutions that they operate are a result of constitutional arrangements found in the Constitution of Canada. Separate schools in Ontario are constitutionally protected under Section 93 of the Constitution Act, 1867, and is further reinforced by Section 29 of the Canadian Charter of Rights and Freedoms. French language schools in Toronto are constitutionally protected under Section 23 of the Canadian Charter of Rights and Freedoms.

In 1980 there were 7 French schools (secular and separate) in Metropolitan Toronto. Maurice Bergevin, the vice principal of École secondaire Étienne-Brûlé, stated that a study from Montreal in 1971 noted that, if francophones in Toronto had the same proportion of schools that anglophones had in Montreal, there would be 31 francophone schools in Metropolitan Toronto. According to a 1971 Canadian federal census, Toronto had 160,000 francophones. The number of French first language schools in Toronto has since grown to 26 (secular and separate). These do not include the English school board's French immersion programs, which are intended for students whose first language was not French.

Several alternative schools in Toronto are also operated by Toronto's public school boards. The oldest is ALPHA Alternative School, which opened in 1972. The first conference for publicly funded alternative schools in the Greater Toronto Area happened in November 2012. Ontario's Ministry of Education distance education program, the Independent Learning Centre, is also headquartered in Toronto.

==== Secular ====
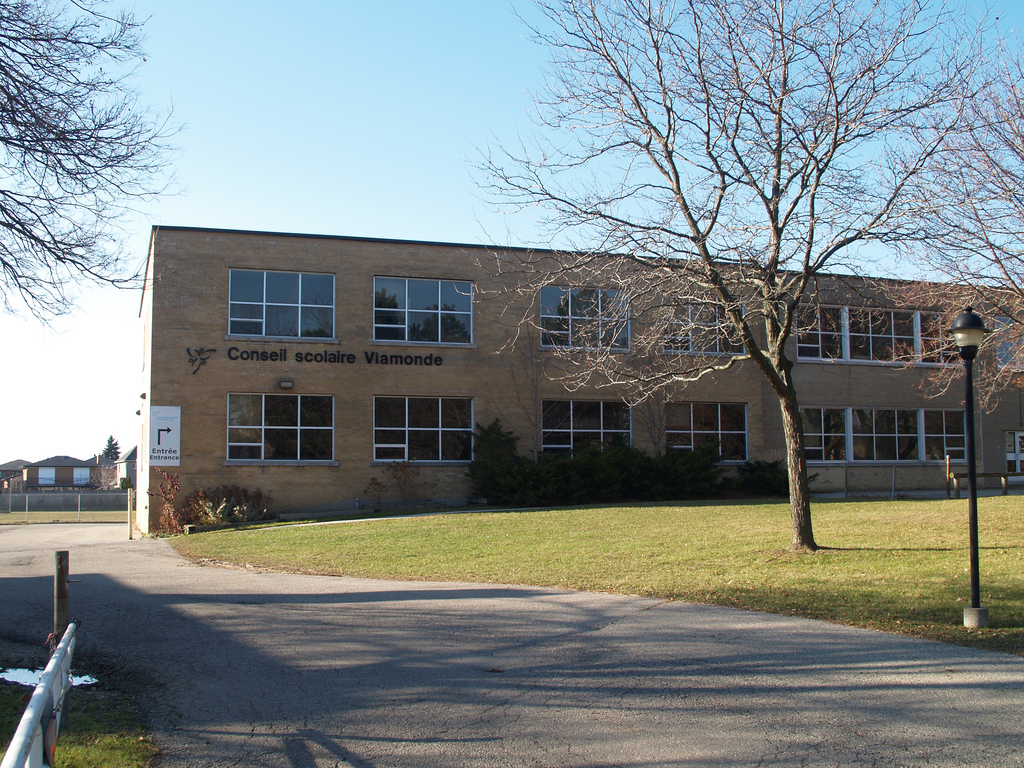
Conseil scolaire Viamonde is a French first language secular school board headquartered in Toronto.

Two public secular school boards operate in Toronto, the Conseil scolaire Viamonde (CSV), and the Toronto District School Board (TDSB). The former operates French first-language schools in Toronto, whereas the latter operates English first-language schools in the city. TDSB only operates schools in Toronto, whereas CSV operates as the school board for Toronto, the larger Greater Golden Horseshoe region, and the Ontario Peninsula.

Both school boards were created in 1998, as a result of the Fewer School Boards Act, 1997. Prior to 1998, each municipality in Metropolitan Toronto had a public English language school board. The six school boards, the Board of Education for the City of York, the East York Board of Education, the Etobicoke Board of Education, the North York Board of Education, the Scarborough Board of Education, and the Toronto Board of Education, all operated under the Metropolitan Toronto School Board umbrella. The Metropolitan Toronto School Board served as the umbrella organization for the municipally-based school boards of Metropolitan Toronto from 1953 to 1998. As a result of the Fewer School Boards Act, and the amalgamation of Metropolitan Toronto, the six municipally based school boards were amalgamated to form TDSB. The assets of the former Metropolitan Toronto School Board were also amalgamated into TDSB.

Prior to 1998, public French language schools were operated by the Conseil des écoles françaises de la communauté urbaine de Toronto (CÉFCUT). As a part of the Fewer School Boards Act, CÉFCUT was merged with other school boards from the Greater Golden Horseshoe and the Ontario Peninsula in 1998, forming CSV.

==== Separate ====
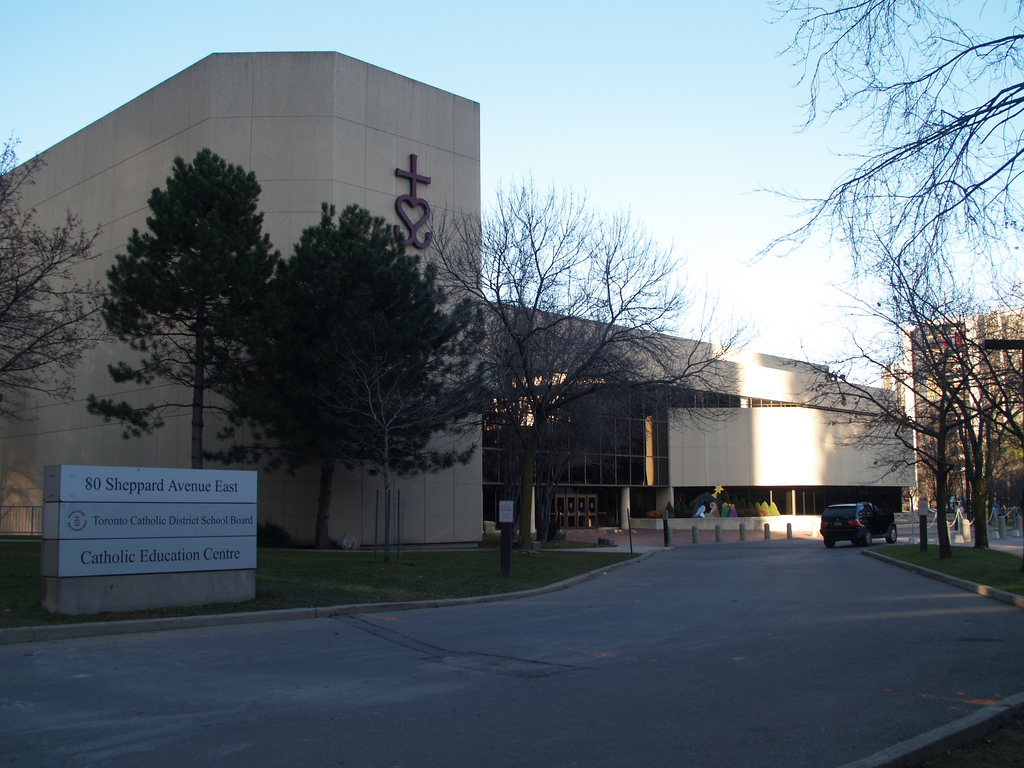
Headquarters for the Toronto Catholic District School Board, the city's English-language separate school board.

Two public separate school boards operate in Toronto, Conseil scolaire catholique MonAvenir, and the Toronto Catholic District School Board (TCDSB). The former operates French first-language schools in Toronto, whereas the latter operates English first-language schools in the city. TDSB only operates schools in Toronto, whereas MonAvenir operates as the school board for Toronto and the larger Greater Golden Horseshoe region.

Prior to the amalgamation of Toronto in 1998, English and French separate schools in Metropolitan Toronto were managed by the Metropolitan Separate School Board (MSSB; Les Conseil des écoles catholiques du Grand Toronto in French). French separate schools in Metropolitan Toronto were operated by Section de langue française, a French language unit of MSSB. In 1998, MSSB was reorganized, with its English and French components split. MSSB's English component formed TCDSB, whereas its French component merged with several other French separate school boards in the Greater Golden Horseshoe to form Conseil scolaire catholique MonAvenir.

=== Private education ===
Toronto is also home to a number of private/independent elementary, secondary, and university-preparatory schools, operating as either non-denominational institutions, or as faith-based schools.

==== Non-denominational ====
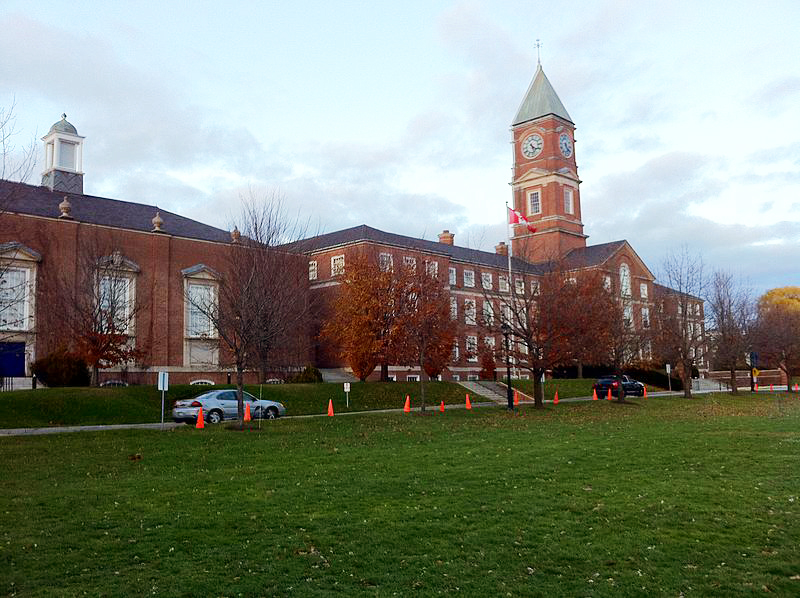
Upper Canada College in Toronto. Founded in 1829, it is the oldest independent school in Ontario.

- A.R.S. Armenian School
- Abelard School
- Arrowsmith School
- Bayview Glen School
- Beach School
- Blyth Academy
- Bond Academy
- Branksome Hall
- Brighton School
- Crescent School
- Crestwood Preparatory College
- German International School Toronto
- Giles School
- Greenwood College School
- Halton High School
- Hudson College
- Kingsway College School
- Linden School
- Lycée Français Toronto
- Metropolitan Preparatory Academy
- Montcrest School
- Nile Academy
- Toronto French School
- Toronto Prep School
- Toronto Waldorf School
- University of Toronto Schools
- Upper Canada College
- WillowWood School
- The York School

==== Faith-based ====
There are several private elementary and secondary religious institutions based in Toronto. In addition, there are two privately managed religious school boards that operate schools in Toronto; the Centre for Jewish Education, and the Toronto Adventist District School Board.

===== Christian =====
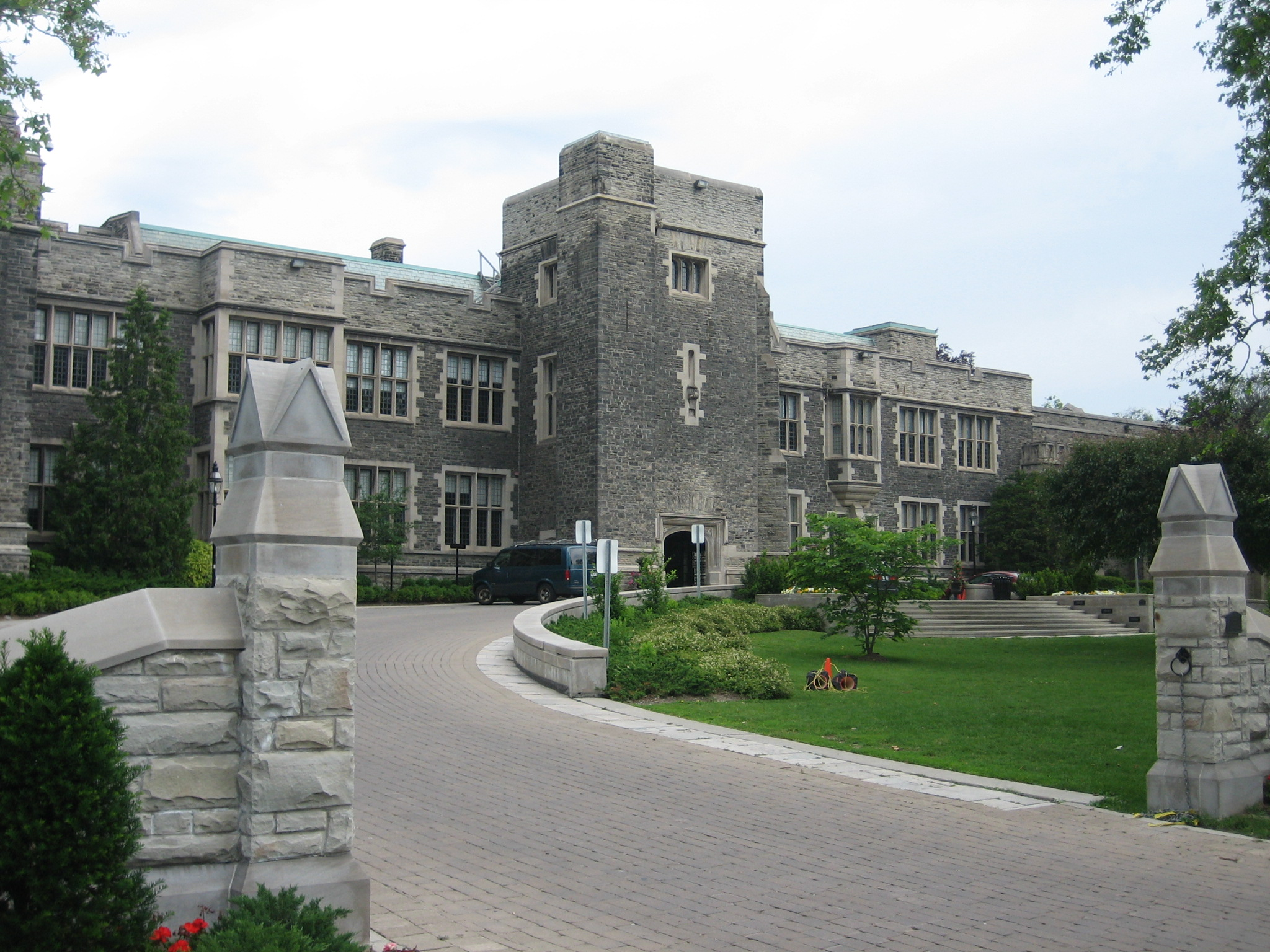
Entrance to Bishop Strachan School, a private school affiliated with the Anglican Church of Canada.

- Bishop Strachan School
- Crawford Adventist Academy
- De La Salle College
- Havergal College
- Hawthorn School for Girls
- North Toronto Christian School
- Royal St. George's College
- St. Clement's School
- St. Michael's College School
- Whitefield Christian Schools

===== Hindu =====
- Sathya Sai School of Canada

===== Islam =====
- Abu Bakr Education Academy
- Abu-Huraira Islamic School
- Al Ashraf Islamic School
- Al Azhar Islamic School
- Al-Azhar Academy Of Canada
- Alashraf Islamic School
- Amanah Islamic Academy
- Baitul Mukarram Academy
- Gibraltar Leadership Academy
- Islamic Community School
- Islamic Foundation of Toronto
- Madinatul-Uloom Academy Of Canada
- Madrasatul-Banaat Islamic School
- Mariyah Islamic School
- Salahedin Islamic School
- Tayyibah Islamic academy
- Um al-Qura Islamic School

===== Jewish =====
- Associated Hebrew Schools
- Bais Yaakov Elementary School
- Bialik Hebrew Day School
- Bnei Akiva Schools of Toronto
- Bnos Bais Yaakov High School
- Eitz Chaim Schools
- Leo Baeck Day School
- Robbins Hebrew Academy
- Tanenbaum Community Hebrew Academy of Toronto (CHAT)
- The Toronto Cheder
- Tiferes Bais Yaakov
- Yeshiva Darchei Torah
- Yeshiva Yesodei HaTorah
- Yeshivas Nachalas Tzvi (Kaplans)
- Yeshivas Zichron Shmaryahu (Mesivta)

==== Defunct institutions ====
Toronto Academy was a former secondary school located on Front Street between Bay and York Streets and had ties to Knox College, Toronto. Established in 1846 as an alternative to provincial schools, it severed ties with Knox College in 1849, and was closed shortly afterwards in 1852. William Lyon Mackenzie's son, future Chief Justice Thomas Moss as well as first African Canadian doctor Anderson Ruffin Abbott.

Before 1987, a number of private Roman Catholic high schools were operated by several religious orders across Toronto. In 1987, a number of these schools joined the public Metropolitan Separate School Board after the funding was announced beginning in 1985. They included:

- Brebeuf College School (North York, 1963– Society of Jesus (1963–1984) and Presentation Brothers (1984–1987))
- Father Henry Carr Catholic Secondary School (Etobicoke, 1974– Basilian Fathers)
- Francis Libermann Catholic High School (Scarborough, 1977– Congregation of the Holy Spirit)
- John J. Lynch High School (North York, 1963– Congregation of Christian Brothers and Daughters of Wisdom)
- Loretto Abbey Catholic Secondary School (North York, 1847– Sisters of Loreto)
- Loretto College School (Toronto, 1915– Sisters of Loreto)
- Michael Power High School (Etobicoke, 1957– Basilian Fathers)
- Neil McNeil High School (Scarborough, 1958– Congregation of the Holy Spirit)
- Notre Dame High School (Toronto, 1949– Congregation of Notre Dame)
- St. Basil-the-Great College School (North York, 1962– Basilian Fathers)
- St. Joseph's College School (Toronto, 1850– Sisters of St. Joseph)
- St. Joseph's Commercial School (Toronto, 1880– Sisters of St. Joseph)
- St. Joseph High School (Etobicoke, 1949– Sisters of St. Joseph)
- St. Joseph's Morrow Park Catholic Secondary School (Toronto, 1960– Sisters of St. Joseph)

== Post-secondary education ==
Toronto is home to a number of post-secondary institutions, including universities, colleges, and vocational schools.

=== Universities ===
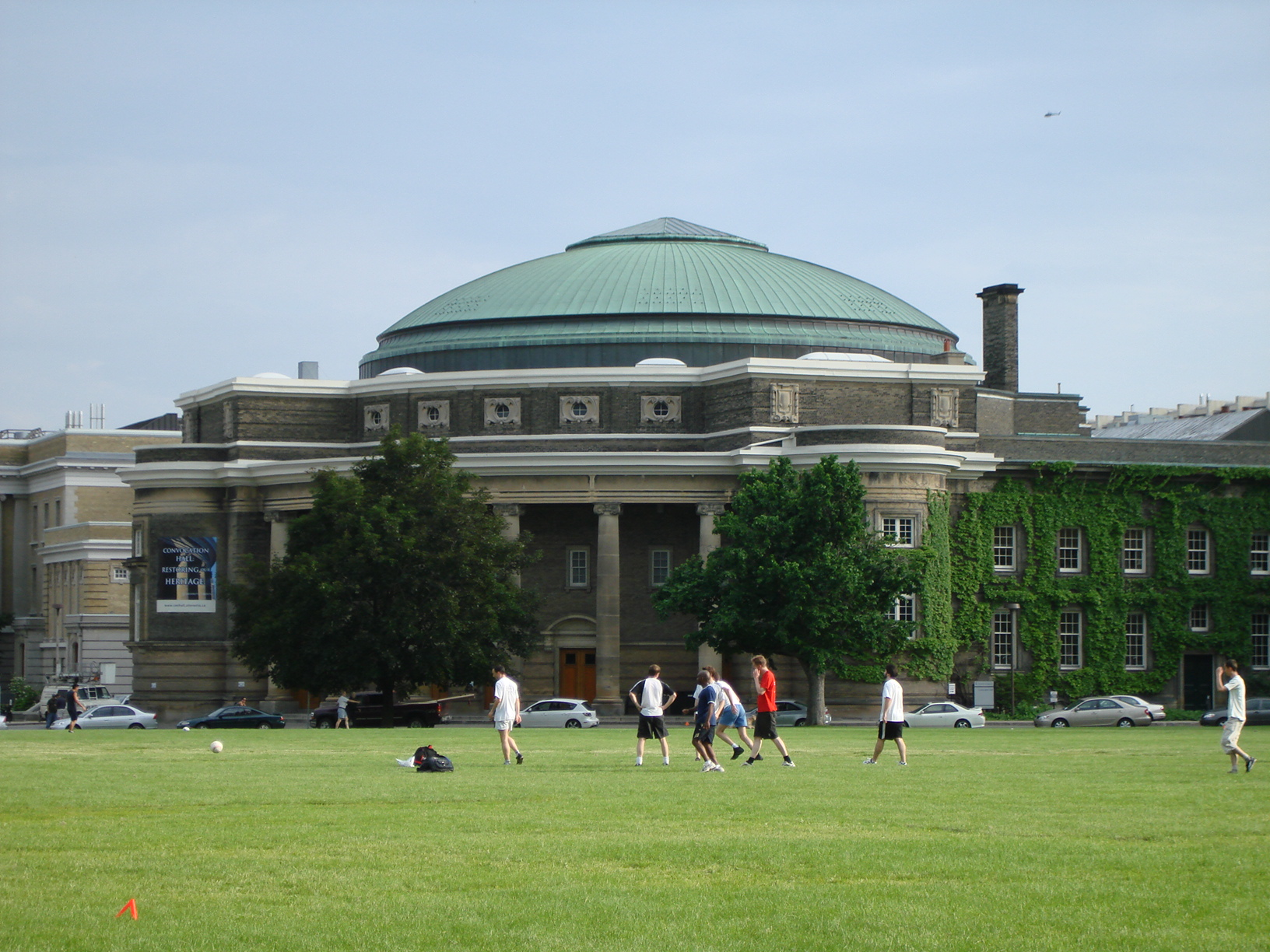
The University of Toronto is the oldest of several universities located in the city. Pictured is Convocation Hall on its St. George campus.

There are five public universities based in Toronto. Four universities are based downtown: OCAD University, Toronto Metropolitan University, Université de l'Ontario français, and the University of Toronto. The University of Toronto is the oldest in Ontario and the largest post-secondary institution in Canada and consists of three campuses: the St. George and Scarborough campuses in the city of Toronto, and the Mississauga campus in the neighbouring city of Mississauga, Ontario. The fifth university in Toronto, York University, is located in the northern portion of the city with two campuses in North York and another in the neighbouring city of Markham.

There are two private universities located in Toronto, Tyndale University and Yorkville University. Tyndale is a private university and a Protestant seminary based in North York. Yorkville University is a for-profit university with facilities in downtown Toronto and the neighbouring city of Vaughan. Yorkville University is based in multiple provinces and operates additional facilities in Fredericton and Vancouver, having been initially founded in New Brunswick. Both private universities were granted the authority to confer certain academics degrees by the province through ministerial consent.

Several universities based outside of Toronto also operate satellite campuses and facilities in the city. The University of Guelph-Humber is a collaborative post-secondary institution in North York, operated by the University of Guelph (based in Guelph, Ontario) and Humber College (a college based in Toronto). Guelph-Humber acts as a satellite campus for its parent institutions, and its graduates are conferred degrees/diplomas from either the University of Guelph or Humber College.

=== Colleges ===
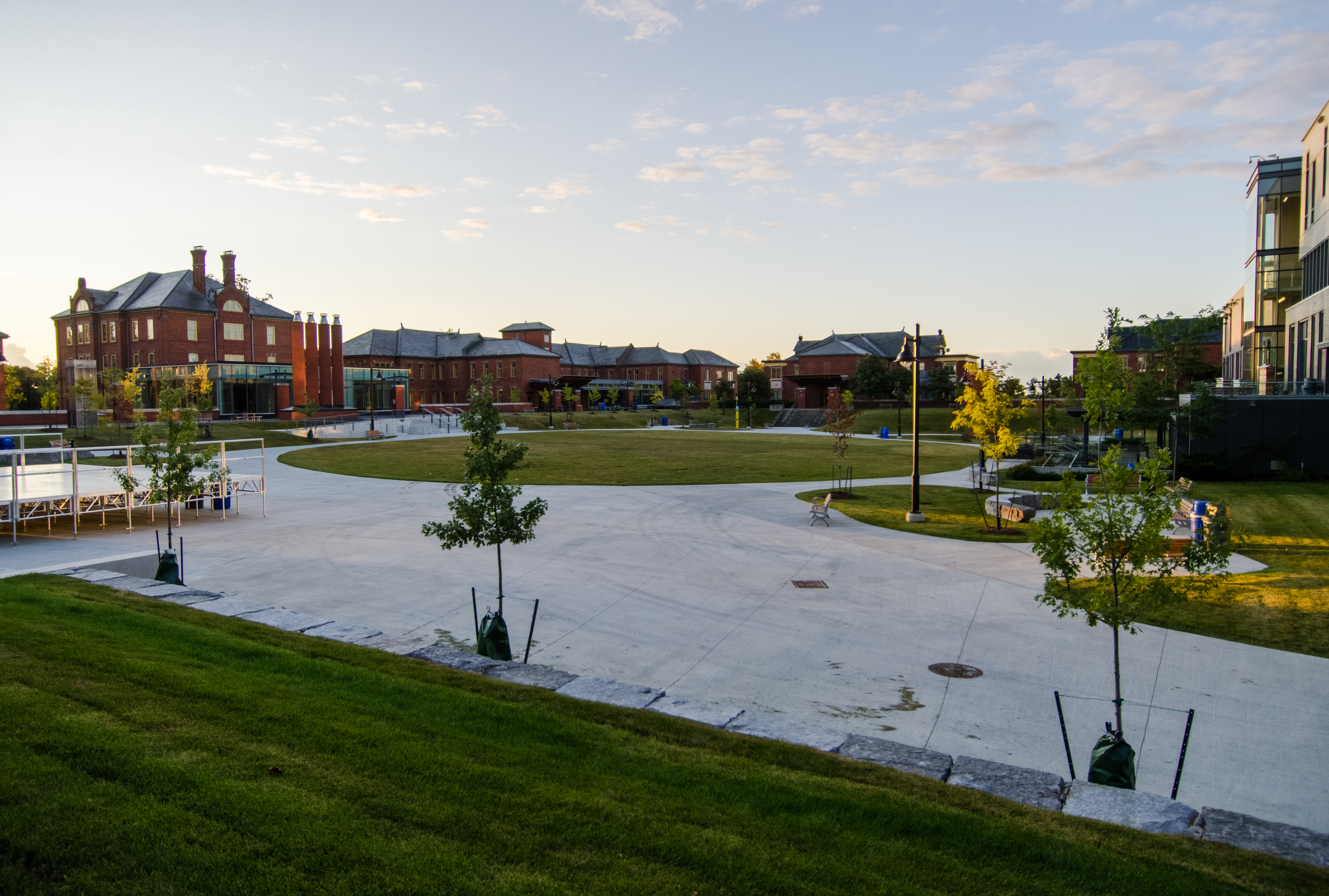
Courtyard at Humber College's Lakeshore Campus in Etobicoke

In Canada, the term college typically refers to a technical, applied art, or applied science school. Four public colleges have their principal campuses located in Toronto: Centennial College, George Brown College, Humber College, and Seneca College. In addition, the city is also home to the satellite campus for Collège Boréal, a college based in Sudbury, Ontario. From 1995 to 2001, the French first language college, Collège des Grands-Lacs, operated in downtown Toronto. Following its closure in 2001, Collège Boréal assumed control of Grands-Lacs programs. Overall, the five colleges operate 29 campuses spread throughout the city.

==== Faith-based ====
Toronto holds five faith-based private colleges and seminaries that were granted partial degree-granting powers by the provincial government. The Institute for Christian Studies, St. Philip's Seminary, and Toronto Baptist Seminary and Bible College are based in Old Toronto; whereas the Institute for Advanced Judaic Studies and Talpiot College are based in North York.

==== Vocational schools ====
A number of private post-secondary vocational schools or career colleges operate in Toronto, including the Academy of Applied Pharmaceutical Sciences, the National Academy of Health & Business, the Oxford College of Arts, Business and Technology, the Dance Arts Institute, the Toronto Institute of Pharmaceutical Technology, and TriOS College. Vocational programs at private career colleges based in Toronto are approved through the provincial Private Career Colleges Act.

== Specialty ==
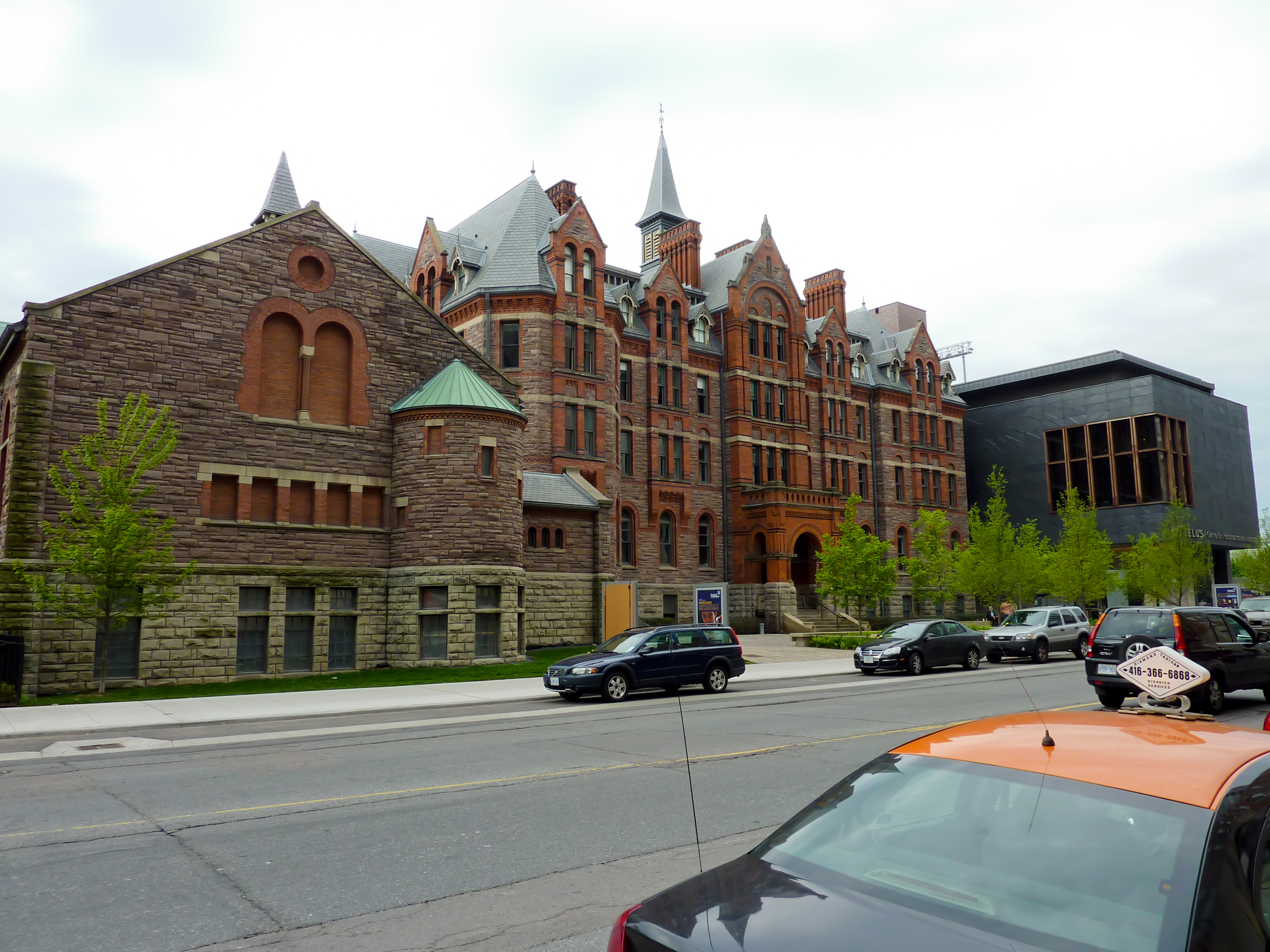
The Royal Conservatory of Music is a non-profit music education institution headquartered in Toronto.

Toronto is home to a number of supplementary schools, which provides additional educational support for students in mainstream public, and private schools. The city also hosts a growing number of publicly funded and private English as a Second Language (ESL) schools and is home to as many as 10,000 ESL students at a time. These are either visa students primarily from Latin America, Asia and Europe, or newly arrived landed immigrants and Canadian citizens.

Specialty schools located in Toronto include:

- Canadian Film Centre
- Canada's National Ballet School
- Royal Conservatory of Music
  - Glenn Gould School
- The Second City Training Centre
- Toronto Japanese School, a Japanese weekend supplementary school

== See also ==
- Collegiate institute
- Education in Canada
- Education in Ontario
- List of educational institutions in Etobicoke
- List of educational institutions in Scarborough
