= Tanenbaum Community Hebrew Academy of Toronto =

Private Jewish day school in Toronto, Ontario, Canada

Anne & Max Tanenbaum Community Hebrew Academy of Toronto

Location
- 200 Wilmington Avenue; Toronto, Ontario, M3H 5J8; Canada; 43.7620279°N 79.4593324°W

Information
- Type: Private Jewish day school
- Religious affiliation: Judaism
- Founded: 1960; 66 years ago
- Principal: Renee Cohen
- Head of school: Dr. Amy Platt
- Grades: 9-12
- Enrollment: 1093 (2020)
- Language: English, Hebrew, French
- Colours: Blue and White
- Website: tanenbaumchat.org

The Anne & Max Tanenbaum Community Hebrew Academy of Toronto (Hebrew: האקדמיה העברית ע״ש טננבאום), also known as CHAT or TanenbaumCHAT, is a private Jewish high school in Toronto, Ontario, established in 1960. As of 2012, it was the largest private high school in Canada. A second campus of TanenbaumCHAT existed from 2000 to 2017 in the York Region, known as the Kimel Family Education Centre.

== History ==
The Community Hebrew Academy of Toronto was founded in 1960 by the Associated Hebrew Schools of Toronto, in whose building CHAT was initially housed, to meet a long-standing need for a comprehensive Jewish high school for students graduating from Toronto's junior Jewish day schools. The founding of the Academy was fraught with controversy, as community leaders struggled to develop a guiding philosophy that would respect various ideologies within the Jewish community. The first Grade Nine class had only three pupils, but subsequent classes grew to full enrolment. CHAT moved to the former Wilmington Public School facility owned by the Toronto District School Board in 1979.

In September 2000, a second campus, called CHAT Richmond Hill, was opened on Wright Street in Richmond Hill to serve students living north of Steeles Avenue. In June 2006, it was announced that the school would be renamed the Anne & Max Tanenbaum Community Hebrew Academy of Toronto (TanenbaumCHAT), in honour of a large gift from the estate of Dr. Anne Tanenbaum. TanenbaumCHAT's north campus moved in September 2007 to the Lebovic Jewish Community Campus on Bathurst Street in Vaughan. The Wilmington Avenue location was renamed the TanenbaumCHAT Wallenberg Campus after Raoul Wallenberg in May 2008, after a school-wide vote, but that name was dropped after the amalgamation of the two campuses in September 2017.

On March 6, 2017, it was announced that the northern campus would close and consolidate with the Wallenberg Campus at the beginning of the September 2017 school year.

In 2023, amid the Gaza war, the school received two bomb threats, and three people were arrested outside the school after threatening students.

== Feeder patterns ==
Jewish day schools that feed into TanenbaumCHAT include Associated Hebrew Schools, Bialik Hebrew Day School, The Toronto Heschel School, The Leo Baeck Day School, Robbins Hebrew Academy, and Netivot HaTorah Day School. TanenbaumCHAT offers a New Stream program for students who have come from the public school system or who did not otherwise previously attend a Jewish elementary school.

== Notable alumni ==
- Oren Eizenman (born 1985), ice hockey player
- Diane Flacks, playwright
- Zach Hyman (born 1992), professional hockey player with the Edmonton Oilers
- Jeremy Podeswa (born 1962), Emmy Award-nominated director
- Moshe Ronen, lawyer and Jewish community leader
- Sharrona Pearl, historian and author
- Issy Wunder (born 2003), hockey player
- Michael Katchen (born 1987), Co-founder and CEO, Wealthsimple

== See also ==
- Education in Ontario
- List of secondary schools in Ontario
