= Netivot HaTorah Day School =

Coordinates: 43°48′32.8″N 79°26′35.8″W

Netivot Hatorah Day School

Location
- 18 Atkinson Avenue; Thornhill, Ontario; Canada

Information
- School type: Private (operated by The Jack and Anne Weinbaum Education Centre)
- Motto: Torah, Israel, Derech Eretz
- Religious affiliation: Zionist Modern Orthodox
- Founded: 1984
- Principal: Ms. Reesa Karch
- Principal: Rabbi David Kadoch (Judaic Studies)
- Head of school: Ms. Becky Trudler
- Grades: Pre-Kindergarten to Grade 8
- Enrollment: 600+
- Language: English, Hebrew
- Area: Thornhill, ON
- Colours: green, blue, purple.
- Team name: Panthers
- Website: www.netivot.com

Netivot HaTorah Day School (Hebrew: נתיבות התורה) is a private, coeducational Orthodox Jewish elementary school in Thornhill, Ontario, Canada. As of 2008, it enrolls 600 students from Junior Kindergarten to Grade 8. The school is affiliated with Mercaz (formerly known as the Board of Jewish Education), the educational pillar of the UJA Federation of Greater Toronto.

== History ==
The school was founded in 1984 by Thornhill parents who sought a more religious atmosphere than that found at the decades-old Associated Hebrew Day School in North Toronto. The school's founding principal was Rabbi Zev Shimansky. Enrollment increased from 42 students in its first year to 160 students in its second year to nearly 600 students by 2003. The school moved to its present location in 1993. It is now located on the same block as a newer building for the Associated school, as well as the north campus of the Leo Baeck Day School. In 2008 the school opened a preschool branch on the premises of Shaarei Shomayim Congregation in midtown Toronto.

== Curriculum ==
In addition to the regular Ontario curriculum, the school teaches the Hebrew language, Torah subjects, and various other Jewish-related topics.

The curriculum is characterized by its Modern Orthodox and Religious Zionist approach, with an emphasis on "Ivrit b'Ivrit" (Hebrew subjects taught in Hebrew) and teachers who are shlichim (Israeli emissaries living in Canada on short, three- to five-year terms). This gives students an authentic taste of modern Israeli language and culture.

Upon completing grade 8, students mostly feed into either Bnei Akiva Schools or Tanenbaum CHAT.

Congregation Ayin L'Tzion Zichron Yisroel, a Modern Orthodox, Zionist minyan, is housed in the school.

== Cookbook ==
In 2003 the Netivot HaTorah parents' organization published a fund-raising cookbook titled Gatherings. Sales of the cookbook netted over $120,000 for the school in its first year of publication.
