= Arlington Middle School =

Arlington Middle School may refer to:

- Arlington Middle School, an Arlington Central School District school in Dutchess County, New York
- Arlington Middle School, a defunct Toronto District School Board school in Humewood-Cedarvale, Toronto, Ontario; now called Leo Baeck Day School
