= BJE =

BJE can refer to:

- Board of Jewish Education (Toronto), an organization that governs Jewish schools in and around Toronto, Ontario, Canada
- Bangsamoro Juridical Entity, a proposed administrative subdivision of the Philippines
- Biao Min language, a language spoken in Guangxi and Hunan provinces, China, by ISO 639 code
- Bhojudih railway station, a train station in Bhojudih, Jharkhand, India
- Baleela Airport, an airport in Baleela, Sudan, by IATA code; see List of airports by IATA code: B
- BJE, a saying from TKC and Fields for having sex, long form version is "Bob Jey Emuly"
