= Clanton Park, Toronto =

Clanton Park
- Neighbourhood
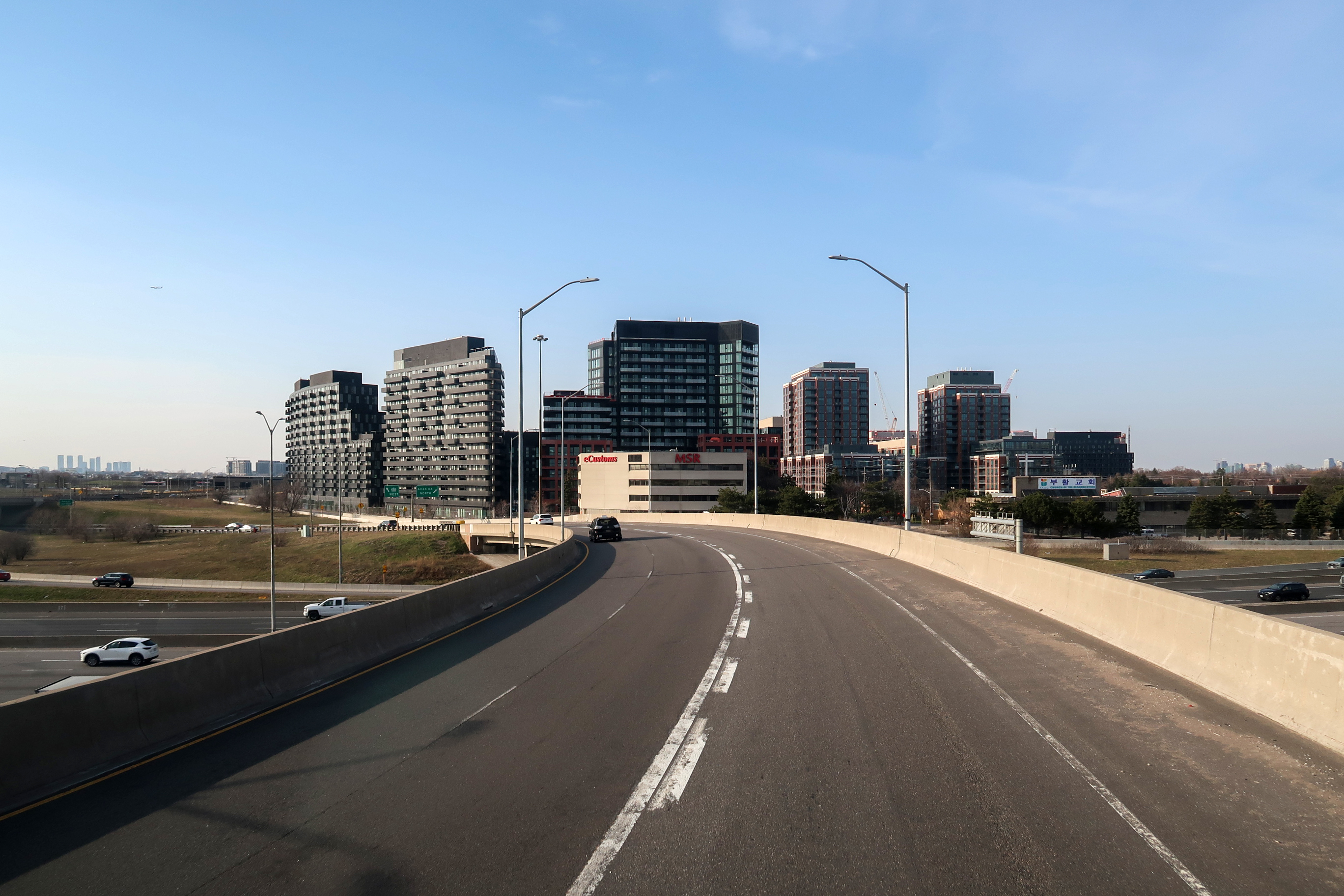
- Condos in Clanton Park (2023)

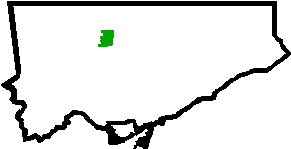
- Location of Clanton Park within Toronto
- Coordinates: 43°45′00″N 79°27′00″W
- Country: Canada
- Province: Ontario
- City: Toronto
- Municipality established: 1850 York Township
- Changed municipality: 1922 North York from York Township
- Changed municipality: 1998 Toronto from North York

Government
  - City Councillors: James Pasternak (Ward 6 York Centre)
  - Federal M.P.: Ya'ara Saks
  - Provincial M.P.P.: Michael Kerzner

Clanton Park (sometimes referred to as Dublin Heights or Wilson Heights) is a neighbourhood in Toronto, Ontario, Canada. Located in the district of North York, it is part of federal and provincial electoral district York Centre, and Toronto electoral wards 9: York Centre (West) and 10: York Centre (East). In 2016, it had a population of 16,472, a 12.7% rise from 2011.

It is bordered on the north by Sheppard Avenue West, on the west by the Downsview Airport whose border includes Wilson Heights Boulevard (north part) and Dufferin Street (south part), on the east by Bathurst Street, and on the south by Highway 401.

Clanton Park is sandwiched between Downsview Park, formerly CFB Downsview, and Earl Bales Park, named after a former reeve of North York. It also contains several smaller parks.

== History ==
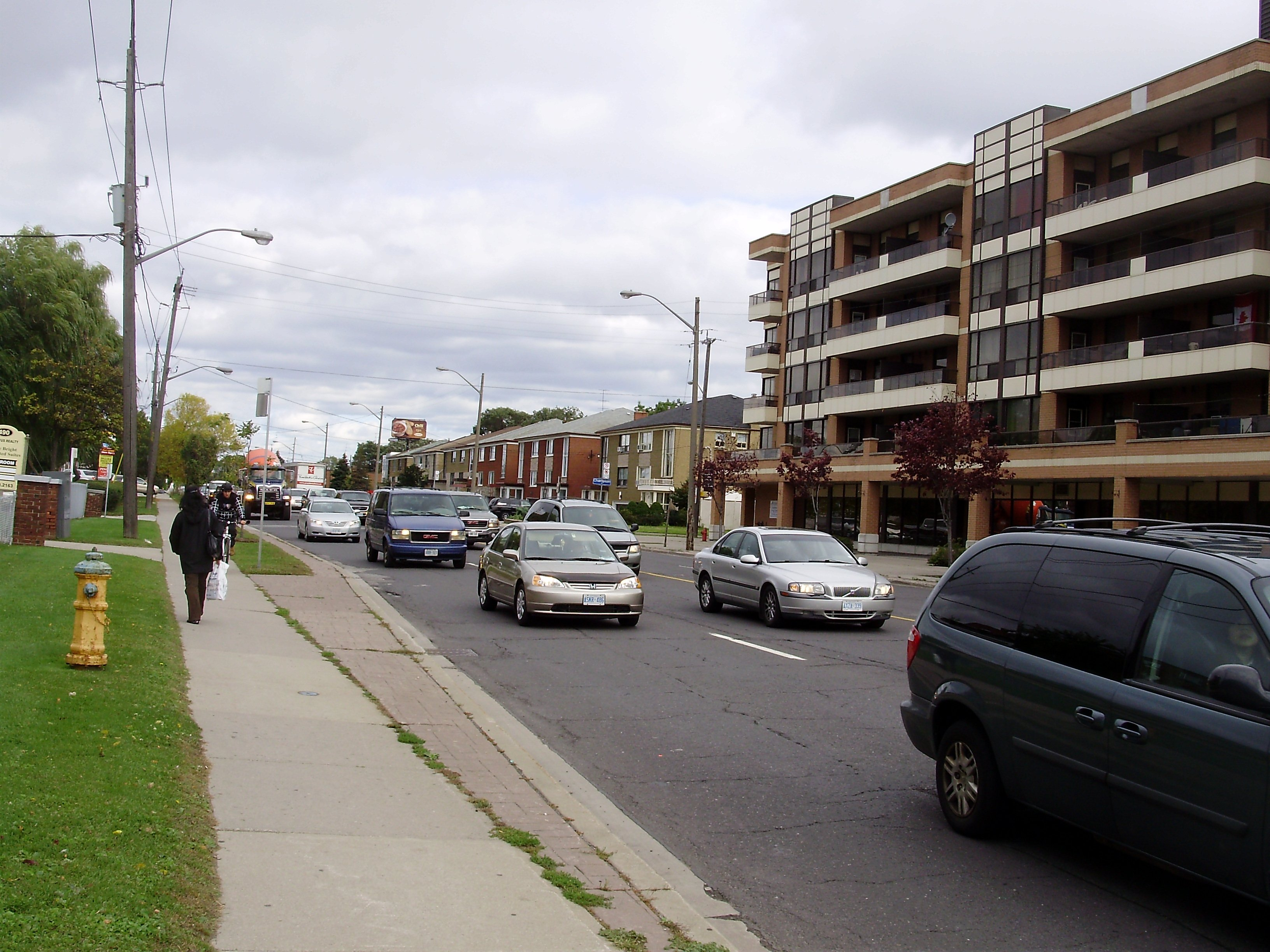
Faywood Boulevard and Wilson Avenue. The area was developed into a residential area in the 1990s.

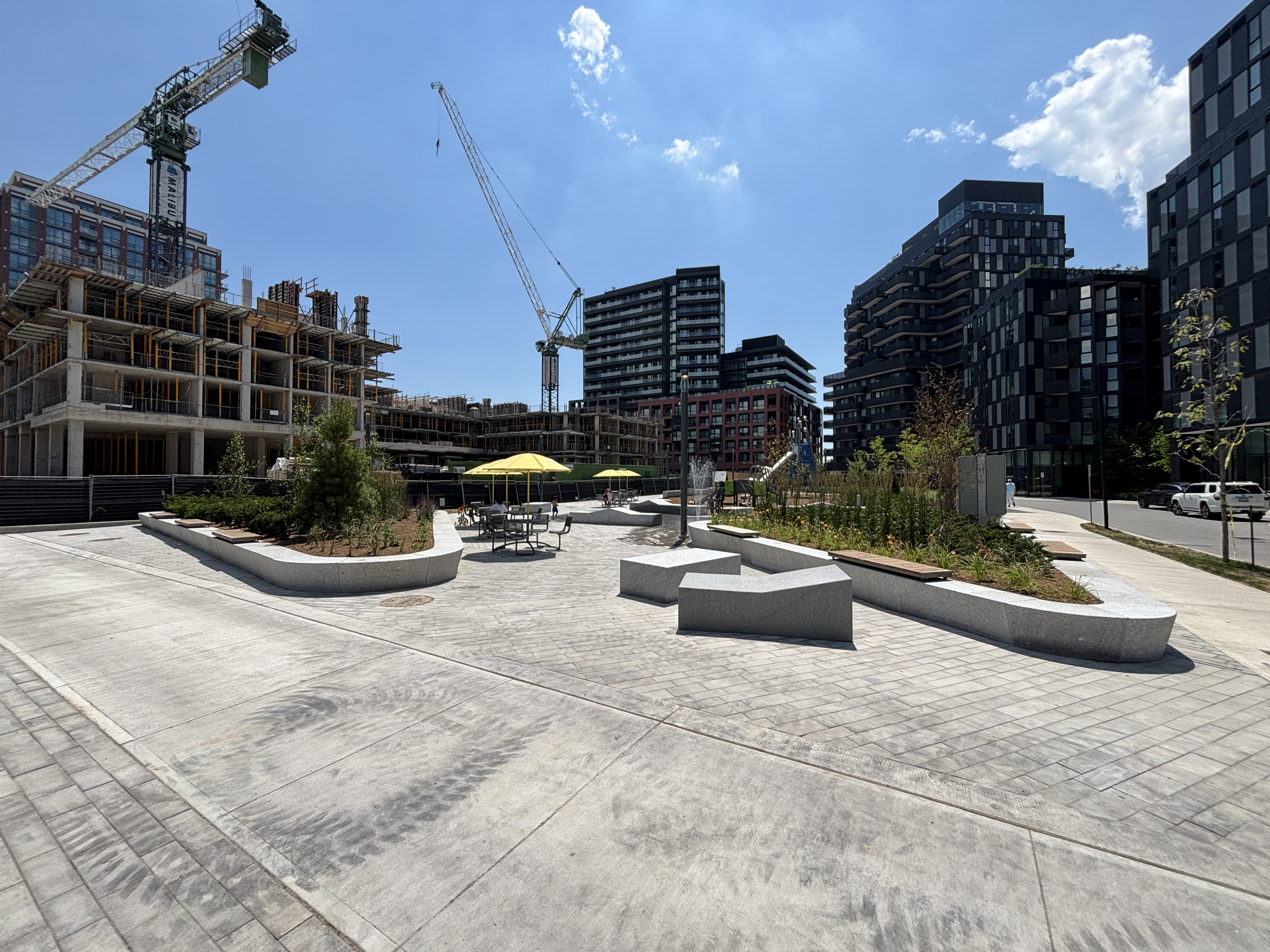
Tippett Park opened in 2025

William Duncan, a linen merchant from Ireland, settled a farm near the crossroads of Sheppard Avenue and Dufferin Street in 1827. A crossroads village was named Dublin after this farm. A general store was constructed in the late 1830s. Duncan built the one-room Dublin schoolhouse in 1872.

The Neil Family Cottage, built circa 1900 and moved to its current location circa 1910 appears on Toronto's inventory of heritage properties.

The Beth David Synagogue, designed by Irving Grossman in 1959, is an example of cast concrete construction. The reliefs on the large concrete panels were designed by Canadian artist Graham Coughtry. The neighbourhood used to be home to the Anglican Church of the Apostles on Sheppard Avenue until it was closed in 2012.

The neighbourhood became part of the Township of North York which later became a borough and then a city, and was then incorporated into the city of Toronto. A large tract of land between Wilson Heights Boulevard and Faywood Boulevard that formerly belonged to the Downsview airport was developed into housing around the 1990s.

== Demographics ==
The neighbourhood is one of the largest Filipino areas of the city, but also contains a large number of residents of Italian, Polish, and Russian origin. The housing ranges from 1950s bungalow style homes to new medium rise condominiums. There is some low income high rise housing.

Clanton Park's top five ethnic and cultural groups (by ancestry) in 2016:

- 21% - Filipino
- 12% - Polish
- 11% - Canadian
- 10% - Italian
- 9% - Russian

The percentage of population below the poverty line dropped from 24% (in 1996) to 17% (in 2016).

== Education ==
Two public school boards operate schools in Clanton Park, the separate Toronto Catholic District School Board (TCDSB), and the secular Toronto District School Board (TDSB). Both TCDSB, and TDSB operate public institutions that provide primary education in the neighbourhood. TCDSB operates St. Robert Catholic School, whereas TDSB operate Dublin Heights Elementary and Middle School, and Faywood Arts-Based Curriculum School. Neither school board operates a secondary school in the neighbourhood, with TDSB secondary school students residing in Clanton Park attending institutions in adjacent neighbourhoods.

The French first language public secular school board, Conseil scolaire Viamonde, and it separate counterpart, Conseil scolaire catholique MonAvenir also offer schooling to applicable residents of Clanton Park, although they do not operate a school in the neighbourhood. CSCM and CSV students attend schools situated in other neighbourhoods in Toronto.

In addition to public schools, the neighbourhood is home to The Toronto Heschel School. The school is a private school that occupies a building that formerly housed Dublin Elementary (until 1980) and then St. Robert Catholic School and Hudson College. It is also home to Yeshivat Or Chaim, a private school founded in 1973.

== Transportation ==
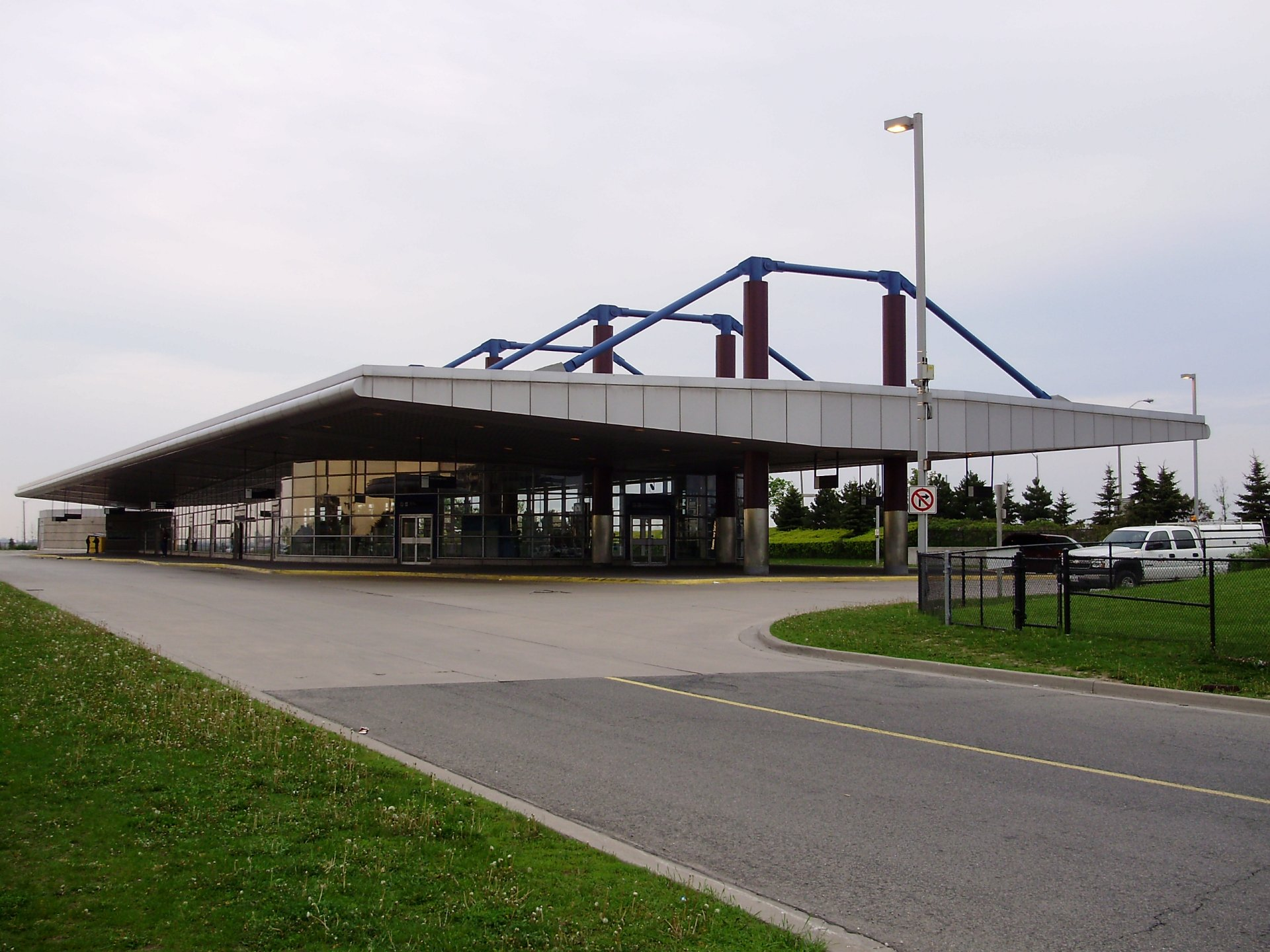
Bus platforms at Sheppard West station, a subway station in Clanton Park.

Several major roadways serve as the neighbourhood's boundaries. Sheppard Avenue bounds the neighbourhood in the north, Bathurst Street to the east, Highway 401 to the south, and Allen Road to the west. Highway 401, and portions of Allen Road, south of Transit Road, are controlled access highway.

Public transportation in Clanton Park is provided by the Toronto Transit Commission. The TTC operates several services in the neighbourhood, including bus routes, and Line 1 Yonge–University of the Toronto subway. Two subway stations are located in the neighbourhood, Sheppard West, and Wilson station. In addition to the TTC, bus routes operated by York Region Transit may be accessed from Sheppard West station.
