= Bialik =

Bialik was originally a Polish/Czech surname before it was adopted by the Ashkenazi Jewish population. The name probably originated from the Polish word Biały (meaning white) used a nickname for a blond or unusually pale person. People with this name include:

- Carl Bialik, American journalist
- Hayim Nahman Bialik (1873–1934), Israel's national poet
- Mayim Bialik (born 1975), American actress

== See also ==
There are several things named after Hayim Bialik

- Bialik College
- Bialik Hebrew Day School
- Bialik High School
- Bialik House
- Bialik Prize
- Kiryat Bialik
- Kfar Bialik
