= Bermondsey (disambiguation) =

Bermondsey may refer to:

- Bermondsey, an area in London
  - Metropolitan Borough of Bermondsey, a Metropolitan borough in the County of London (1900–1965)
  - Bermondsey (UK Parliament constituency), a Parliamentary constituency (1885–1918 and 1950–1983)
  - Bermondsey (London County Council constituency)
  - Bermondsey tube station, a London Underground station
- Bermondsey, Toronto, an industrial area in Toronto, Canada and named after local roadway Bermondsey Drive
