= Bermondsey, Toronto =

Bermondsey
- Neighbourhood
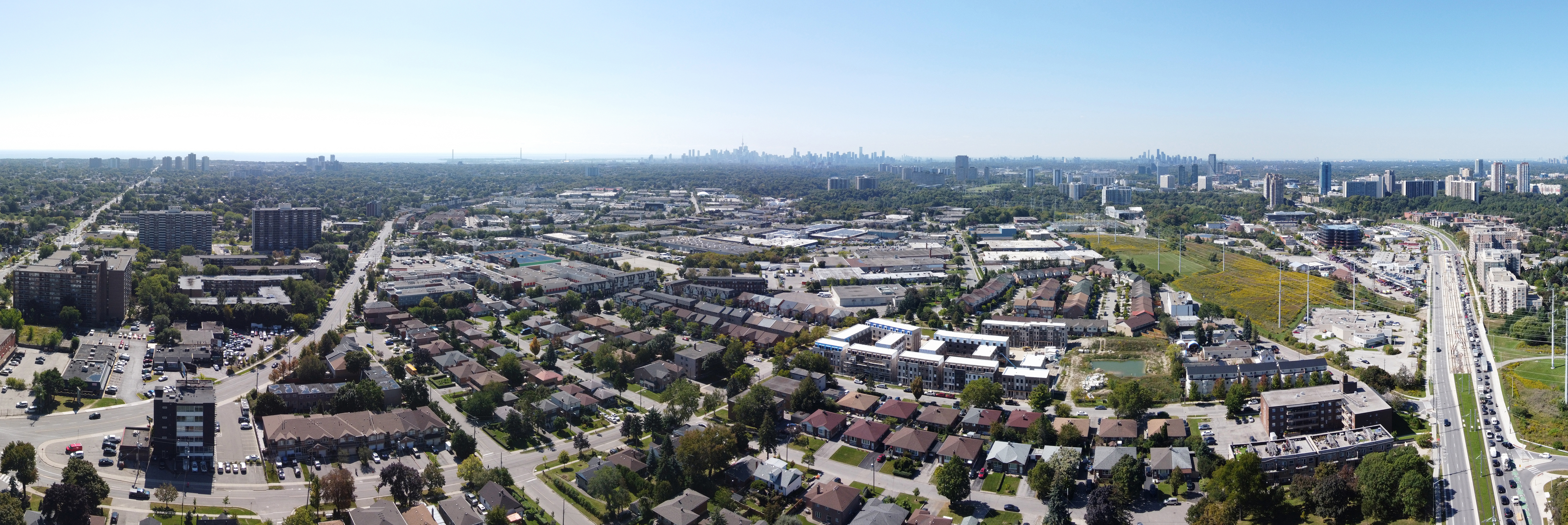
- Aerial view of Bermondsey in 2023

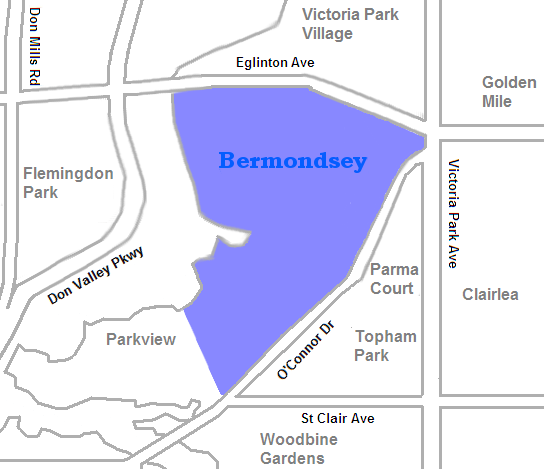
- Map of Bermondsey neighbourhood
- Coordinates: 43°41′44″N 79°27′00″W
- Country: Canada
- Province: Ontario
- City: Toronto

Bermondsey is a neighbourhood in Toronto, Ontario, Canada. It covers a rough triangle with the Don Valley to the west, Eglinton Avenue to the northeast and O'Connor Drive to the southeast. It straddles the border of the former suburbs of East York and North York. The area is named after Bermondsey Drive that runs through the centre of the district and named after Peek Freans' head office location at Bermondsey.

== History ==
As trucks replaced trains and ships as the main method for transporting goods, industries in Toronto no longer needed to be placed near to rail lines or the harbour. As a result a number of industrial areas developed in the Toronto suburbs during the 1950s and 1960s. Bermondsey was one of these, as was the Golden Mile located a short distance to the east.

The area today is home to some 200 firms employing a total of some 7,000 people. About half work in manufacturing, with the others in offices, retail, warehouses and non-profit. The largest employer in the area is the Peek Freans cookie factory. Other major employers in the area are Habitat for Humanity Toronto and its Habitat Toronto ReStore, Epitome Pictures, Bell Canada and the Ontario Secondary School Teachers' Federation. There are also a number of clothing and electronics companies in the area. It is also the location of Metropolitan Preparatory Academy. In April 2013, a facility on Curity Avenue became the new home of The Model Railroad Club of Toronto.

== List of businesses on Bermondsey ==
- Habitat for Humanity
- Peek Freans
- Epitome Pictures
- Bell Canada
- Ontario Secondary School Teachers' Federation
- The Model Railroad Club of Toronto
- Mill Street Brewery
- Muddy York Brewing Company
