= Talpiot (disambiguation) =

Talpiot is an Israeli neighborhood in southeastern Jerusalem.

Talpiot may also refer to:

- Talpiot program, academic program affiliated with the Israel Defense Forces
- Talpiot Tomb, rock-cut tomb in the East Talpiot neighborhood
- Talpiot College (Toronto), Jewish post-secondary educational institution in Toronto, Ontario, Canada
- Talpiot College of Education, religious teacher training college in Holon, Israel
