= USDS =

USDS or USDs may refer to:

- United States Digital Service
  - United States DOGE Service
- United States Department of State
- United States dollar
- United Synagogue Day School
