= Wilson Heights =

Wilson Heights may refer to:

- Wilson Heights (electoral district), a former provincial electoral district in Ontario, Canada
- Wilson Heights, Toronto, a neighbourhood in Toronto
