= Institute for Advanced Judaic Studies =

Orthodox Jewish Yeshiva

Coordinates: 43°42′52.5″N 79°25′48.3″W

- Other names: IAJS, Kollel Toronto
- Type: Private yeshiva
- Established: 1997
- Founders: Rabbi Shlomo Eliyahu Miller, Rabbi Yaakov Hirschman
- Parent institution: Kollel Toronto
- Religious affiliation: Orthodox Judaism
- Vice-president: Albert Engel
- Dean: Rabbi Nosson Hofman
- Location: 515 Coldstream Avenue, Toronto, Ontario, Canada
- Colours: Blue and White
- Website: kollel.com/iajs/

The Institute for Advanced Judaic Studies is a Canadian Orthodox Jewish yeshiva. It is accredited by the Ontario Ministry of Education as a private university and has sovereignty to award bachelor's, master's, and doctorate degrees in Talmudic law and Judaic studies.

== History ==
In 1970 a group of ten families from the BMG Institute for Advanced Learning of Lakewood, New Jersey moved to Toronto and founded the Toronto Kollel. The founders include Rav Shlomo Eliyahu Miller, the Rosh Kollel of the Kollel Avreichim Institute for Advanced Judaic Studies in Toronto, and head of its Beis Din (rabbinical court) and Rav Yaakov Hirschman.

Known previously as the Institute for Advanced Talmudic Study - Kollel Avreichim, it was incorporated by letters patent dated October 9, 1970, as an institution of higher learning in theology, religious education, scholarship, and research.

== Facility ==
The building houses the 3,000-square-foot Bais Medrash, classrooms, three book libraries, a CD library, two computer online libraries, the Bar Ilan computer resource library, the Kol Halashon online Lecture library, meeting rooms, a kitchen, and a dining room.

The Ladies Auxiliary maintains the Weinstock Memorial Library which is open to the public and runs a series of community lectures.

== The New Campus ==
During the 50th Anniversary Dinner (which took place on November 28, 2022, at The Embassy Grand Convention Center), The Chairman Mr. Ben Friedman Toronto, announced the purchase of a new apartment building located on Fraserwood Avenue, which will be named The Shimon Stern Residence. The new building will allow the institution to expand their scholars base and host new families who will join the Kollel in the future. In addition, Mr. Ben Friedman also presented a 3d rendering of the new Bais Medrash to be built on Coldstream Avenue. The new building will have more study halls, plenty of parking and a state of the art library.

== Kollel Toronto ==
Kollel Toronto is an institution of learning consisting of a core group of scholars who are engaged in full-time Torah study at an advanced level—headed by Roshei Kollel, Rav Shlomo Miller שליט"א* and Rav Yaakov Hirschman שליט"א.

- (שליט"א is pronounced "shehletah"; it is an acronym for שיחיה לימים טובים ארוכים, literally that he should live to good long days; used as an honorific after a living rabbi's name.)

== Programs ==
- diplomas and certificates
- Bachelor of Judaics
- Bachelor of Talmudic Law (BTL)
- Master of Judaics
- Master of Talmudic Law
- Doctor of Philosophy in Judaics
- Doctor of Philosophy in Talmudic Law

== Notable alumni ==
=== Rabbis in Toronto ===
- Rabbi Yacov Shalom Felder, Rabbi of Shomrei Shabbos Synagogue
- Rabbi Mordechai Kanner, Cong. Heichal Kol Yaakov
- Rabbi Uri Kaufman, Cong. Aguda South Anshe Kielce
- Rabbi Chaim Dovid Kulik, Cong. Zichron Yitzchok
- Rabbi Mitch Mandel, Director of Ohr Somayach, Jerusalem Toronto
- Rabbi David Pam, Cong. Zichron Shneur
- Rabbi Mordechai Scheiner, Beth Avraham Yoseph of Toronto
- Rabbi Rafael Shmulewitz, Tiferes Bais Yaakov
- Rabbi Yehuda Oppenheimer, Marlee Ave. Shul
- Rabbi Aberbach, New York
- Rabbi Blitz, Detroit, MI
- Rabbi Davis, Founder of Yeshiva Gedola of Passaic
- Rabbi Drillman, New York
- Rabbi Fishman, Principal of Hebrew Academy of Cleveland
- Rabbi Frankel, New York
- Rabbi Fuerst, Lakewood, NJ
- Rabbi Glezerman, Lakewood, NJ
- Rabbi Gordon, New York
- Rabbi Herskowitz, Lakewood, NJ
- Rabbi Horowitz, Kiryat Sefer, Israel
- Rabbi Jundef, Lakewood, NJ
- Rabbi Kovitz, New York
- Rabbi Kraminer, New York
- Rabbi Kupfer, Executive Director of Gindi Maimonides Academy Los Angeles
- Rabbi Marcus, Buffalo, New York List of Young Israel Synagogues#:~:text=Rabbi Eliezer Marcus
- Rabbi Muller, Kollel Avrohom Dovid, Monsey, NY
- Rabbi Nojovits, Lakewood, NJ
- Rabbi Plotnik, Bais Yaakov Lakewood
- Rabbi Rosen, Southfield, Michigan
- Rabbi Rubin, Queens, New York
- Rabbi Strassfeld, Englewood, NJ
- Rabbi Sauer, New York
- Rabbi Sekula, Lakewood, NJ
- Rabbi Tanenbaum, Seattle, Washington
- Rabbi Weissman, Bene Berak, Israel
- Rabbi Weinberg, New York
- Rabbi Zuckerman, Detroit, MI
