= It Don't Cost Nothin' to Say Good Morning =

- Directed by: Kenny Hotz; Spencer Rice
- Produced by: Sebastian Cluer; Kenny Hotz
- Starring: Kenny Hotz
- Cinematography: Sebastian Cluer; Kenny Hotz
- Edited by: Kenny Hotz
- Release date: 1994
- Running time: 18 minutes
- Country: Canada

It Don't Cost Nothin' to Say Good Morning is a 1994 documentary film directed by Kenny Hotz and Spencer Rice. The film is about the life of a homeless man, known only as 'Shorty' Gordy, who was a beloved but drunken, potty-mouthed panhandler, which was filmed over three years, covering Gordy's life and death. The movie premiered at Palm Springs Film Festival, Cinéfest, the Worldwide Short Film Festival and won best short at the Hot Docs Film Festival.
