= Simon Gosejohann =

German comedian and television presenter

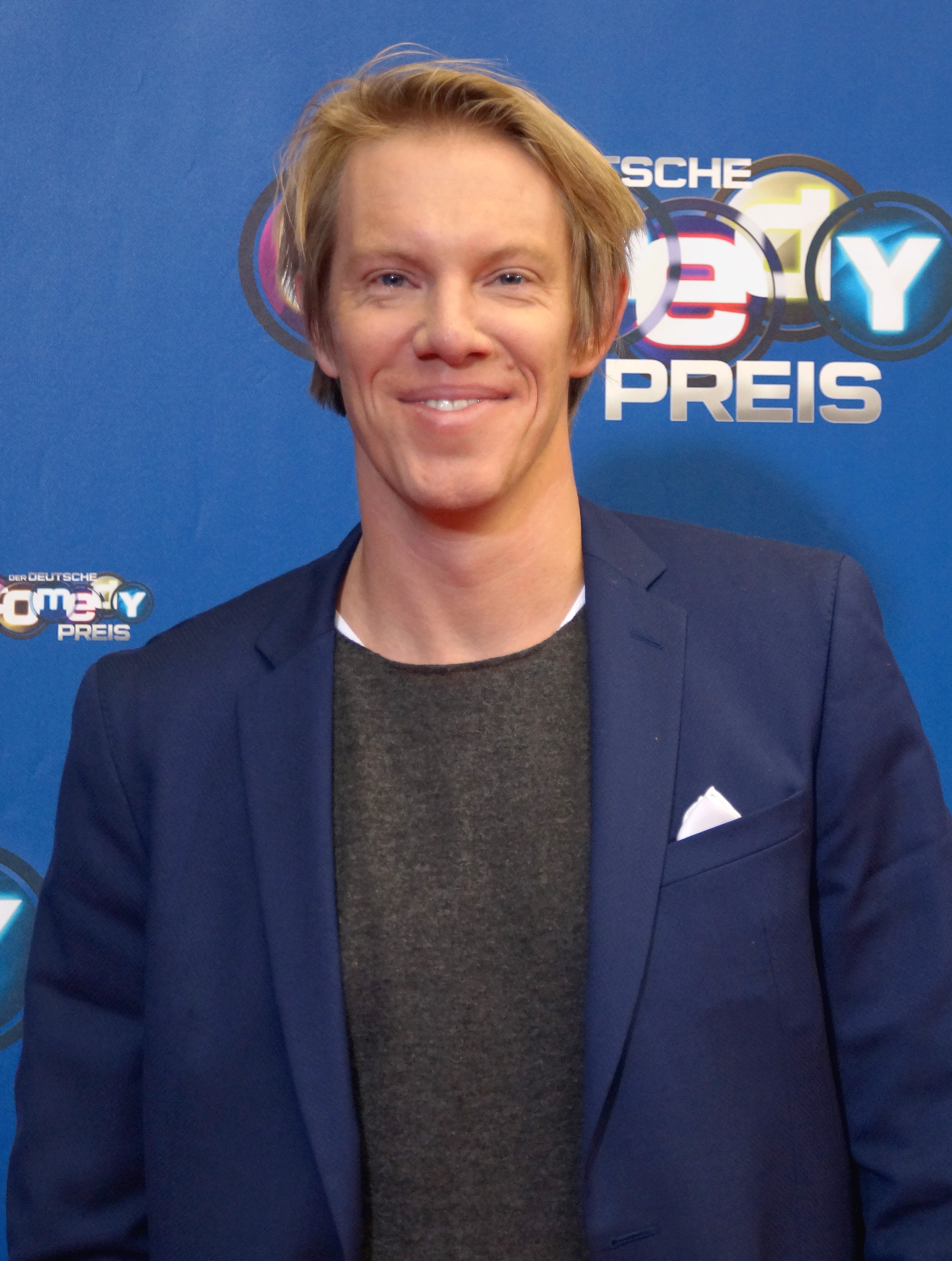
- Gosejohann in 2016
- Born: 9 January 1976 (age 50); Gütersloh, West Germany
- Occupations: Comedian, television presenter, actor
- Website: simon-gosejohann.de

Simon Gosejohann (born 9 January 1976) is a German comedian, television presenter and actor.

In 2008, Gosejohann won the "Deutscher Comedypreis" (German Comedy Award) in the category "Best Comedy Show" for his role in Elton vs. Simon. A year later, he received the "Best Hidden Camera Award" for his show Comedystreet.
