= Anne Tanenbaum =

Canadian philanthropist (1909-2008)

- Born: 1909; New York, U.S.
- Died: April 20, 2008 (aged 98); Toronto, Ontario, Canada
- Spouse: Max Tanenbaum (m. 1930-1983; his death)
- Children: 7, including Larry Tanenbaum

Anne Tanenbaum (1909 – 2008) was a Canadian philanthropist. She was best known for supporting Jewish and educational programs in Toronto.

== Early years ==
Growing up poor in The Bronx, New York, she began working at age eight. She moved with her family in 1924 to Toronto. There, she met Max Tanenbaum, who had dropped out of school at 13 to work in his family's scrap metal business. They married in 1930. He went on to become a business magnate enabling the couple's future philanthropy.

== Awards ==
- Honorary Doctorate from the University of Toronto
- Honorary Doctorate from the Ben Gurion University
- Outstanding Philanthropist Award from the Association of Fundraising Professionals’ Greater Toronto chapter

== Legacy and namesakes ==
- Tanenbaum Community Hebrew Academy of Toronto
- Anne and Max Tanenbaum Joint Chair Program at the University of Toronto's University Health Network
- The Anne and Max Tanenbaum Chair Program in Biomedical Research
- Anne and Max Tanenbaum Chair in Cognitive Neuroscience
- Anne Tanenbaum Centre for Jewish Studies
- Dr. Anne Tanenbaum Gallery School
