= Elton vs. Simon =

- Starring: Elton; Simon Gosejohann
- Country of origin: Germany
- Original language: German

Production
- Running time: 30 minutes
- Production companies: Elton.tv; Brainpool; Distcration Formats

Original release
- Network: ProSieben
- Release: June 3, 2004

Elton vs. Simon is a German remake of the Canadian reality comedy show Kenny vs. Spenny.

== Plot ==
Like Kenny and Spenny, Elton and Simon are friends who share an apartment and fight each other in unusual competitions. The winner of a competition is allowed to think out some kind of unpleasant task called Bestrafung (punishment) the loser has to perform. In Kenny vs. Spenny, this part is called "Humiliation".

=== Seasons 1 and 2 ===
Seasons 1 and 2 of Elton vs. Simon were very similar to the original format Kenny vs. Spenny. It had almost the same opening credits (only the heads of Kenny and Spenny were replaced with those of Elton and Simon) and most of the competition ideas were adopted from the original series. The two seasons with a total of 15 episodes were produced and aired in 2005 and 2006.

=== Season 3 & 4 ===
In 2008 & 2010, the third and fourth seasons were produced. The concept of the series was slightly changed and it was renamed Elton vs. Simon - Die Live-Show. Instead of having one competition per episode, Elton and Simon had to do several mini-competitions. The first one to win four competitions was the overall winner. Some of the competitions and the punishment were performed in front of an audience.

== Episode ==
=== Season 1 & 2 ===
number	original airdate	German Episode title	English translation	winner	punishment
Pilot
1.	3 June 2004	Der Wachbleib-Wettbewerb	staying awake competition	Elton	Simon's bed is placed in a school yard
Season One
2.	21 April 2005	Wer hat das bessere Sperma?	Who has better sperm?	Simon	Elton has to stand in the cold Rhine
3.	12 May 2005	Wer kann in drei Tagen mehr abnehmen?	Who can lose more weight in three days?	Simon	Elton has to eat very hot Indian chicken curry
4.	2 June 2005	Wer hat die besseren Manieren?	Who's got better manners?	Elton	Elton hits Simon's fingers with a ruler
5.	9 June 2005	Wer kann länger ohne Arme auskommen?	Who can go longer without using their hands?	Elton	Simon has to clean a toilet with his toothbrush
6.	23 June 2005	Wer stellt in drei Tagen die bessere Zirkusnummer auf?	Who can make the better circus act?	Elton	Simon has to hitchhike to Cologne in a clown costume
7.	30 June 2005	Miniwettbewerbe	mini-competitions	Elton	Simon has to walk up the stairs of a multi-storey building
Season Two
8.	20 April 2006	Wer bleibt länger angekettet?	Who can stay handcuffed the longest?	Elton	Simon has to smoke a cigarette that Elton puts out with a fire extinguisher
9.	27 April 2006	Wer bleibt länger auf einer Kuh sitzen?	Who can sit on a cow the longest?	Simon	Elton has to reach into a cow's rectum
10.	4 May 2006	Wer bleibt länger auf allen Vieren?	Who can stay on all fours the longest?	Simon	Elton has to play circus pony in a pedestrian zone
11.	11 May 2006	Wer kann länger nicht reden?	First one to talk loses	Elton	Simon has to badmouth himself publicly
12.	18 May 2006	Wer kann in drei Tagen mehr Geld verdienen?	Who can earn the most money in three days?	Elton	Simon has to wait tables dressed up as a woman
13.	1 June 2006	Wer kann in drei Tagen mehr zunehmen?	Who can gain the most weight in three days?	Simon	Elton has to ride Breakdance for a long time
14.	8 June 2006	Miniwettbewerbe	mini-competitions	Elton	Simon has to text a "love letter" to a celebrity
15.	on DVD only	Miniwettbewerbe	mini-competitions	Elton	Simon has to mow the lawn with scissors

== Season 3 ==
Episode	Date	Mini-Competitions	Winner	Punishment
16.	24 June 2008	- Gegen die Wand (Against the Wall) - Bob der Baumeister (Bob the Builder) - Plörren Pong (Disgust pong) - Caught in the Akt (Caught in the act) - Dicke Hose (Big pants)	Elton (4–1)	Simon has to drink coffee that is filtered through Elton's socks
17.	1 July 2008	- Human Bowling - Rollerkotzer (Rollerpuke) - Spaßkanone (Funcannon) (after tie "throwing dice") - Platzangst (agoraphobia) (after tie "throwing dice") - Kloppe von Sue (Pain from Sue) - Starschnitt (Starcut)	Simon (4–2)	Simon puts his feet in rollmops before massaging Elton's face with his feet
18.	8 July 2008	- Spiderman - Promilletest (alcohol level test) - Bierschiebung (beer shift) - Wer's glaubt (Who believes it) - 180-Grad Dart (180 degrees dart) - Angel Maul (Fishing mouth) - Am laufenden Band (at the running band)	Elton (4–3)	Elton shoots 50 rubber bands at Simon's neck
19.	15 July 2008	- Golfkrieg (Golf war) - Feuerzauber Hamburg (Fire magic Hamburg) (after tie "heating plate") - Automarder (Car marter) - Finnischer Tango (Finnish Tango) - Klammeraffe (clip monkey) - Zieh dich warm an (put on warm clothes) - Schwammkopf (Spongehead)	Simon (4–3)	Elton has to put a balloon under his shirt which is pumped up until it bursts
20.	22 July 2008	- Herr der Fliegen (Lord of the flies) - "Schatz, bringst du mal den Müll raus?" ("Honey, can you take out the trash?") - Jojo Diät (Jojo diet) - Walz das Mäh (Walz the baa) - Das macht Kraft (That makes power) - Bibabutzemann - Elchtest (Moose test)	Elton (4–3)	Simon has to take a bath with ice cubes
21.	29 July 2008	- Katz der Restauranttester (Katz the restaurant tester) - Is cool Man - Helium Karaoke - Callgirl Memory - Rittersport (Knight sport) - Polterabend (wedding shower) - Es werde Licht (It become light)	Elton (4–3)	an old man licks on Simon's ear
22.	5 August 2008	- Ballermann (shooting man) - Straßenstrich (Street prostitution) - Let's Limbo - Colt Sievers - Rockabilly	Elton (4–1)	Simon is blindfolded and has to take a piece of cheese out of a cheese cover with mousetraps and barbed wire
23.	12 August 2008	- Der Berg ruft (The mountain is calling) - Eis Eis Baby (Ice ice baby) - Jeder Schuss ein Treffer (Every shot is a hit) - Dr. Haeger bittet zum Diktat (Dr. Haeger request for a dictation) - Eilzustellung (Express delivery)	Simon (4–1)	Simon partially waxes Elton's belly and leg
24.	on DVD only	Post aus Flensburg (A letter from Flensburg^{a})	Elton	-

^{a}all motorists caught speeding in Germany are registered in Flensburg
