= Kenny Hotz's Triumph of the Will =

Canadian television series

- Genre: Reality; Comedy
- Created by: Kenny Hotz
- Written by: Kenny Hotz; Jeff Kassel; Sebastian Cluer
- Directed by: Sebastian Cluer; Kenny Hotz
- Starring: Kenny Hotz
- Country of origin: Canada
- No. of seasons: 1
- No. of episodes: 6

Production
- Executive producers: John Morayniss; Noreen Halpern; Jeff Kassel; Kenny Hotz
- Producers: Jamie Tiernay; James Crouch; Margret O'Brien
- Editor: Marco Porsia
- Running time: 22 minutes

Original release
- Network: Action
- Release: July 22 – August 5, 2011

Kenny Hotz's Triumph of the Will is a Canadian reality comedy television series created, co-written, co-directed by, and starring Kenny Hotz. The series follows Hotz as he attempts to undertake a series of difficult challenges that are socially or morally questionable. It debuted on Action July 22, 2011, and ran for one season of six episodes.

== Episodes ==
=== Season 1 (2011) ===
#	Airdate	Title	Information
1	July 22, 2011	"Rags to Bitches"	Kenny sets out to see if the American Dream is alive and well in Las Vegas.
2	July 22, 2011	"Sowschwitz"	Kenny tries to stop eating pork (one of his favorite foods) after learning about the intelligence of pigs.
3	July 29, 2011	"Children of Abraham"	Kenny tries to get the Jewish community to help build a mosque.
4	July 29, 2011	"Take My Mom… Please!"	Kenny helps his mother find love.
5	August 5, 2011	"The French ReConnection"	Kenny tries to overcome his hatred for the people of France.
6	August 5, 2011	"Kennibal"	Kenny tries to become a cannibal.

== Home media ==
Season 1 was released on DVD uncensored on November 15, 2011 in Canada.
