= Shlomo Miller =

Rabbi Shlomo Eliyahu Miller
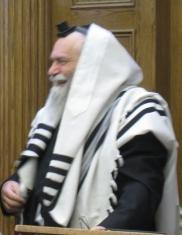
- Shlomo Miller

Head of the Beis Din, Va'ad Harabonim of Lakewood

Co-founder of the Kollel Avreichim Institute for Advanced Talmud Study, Toronto

Personal details
- Education: Talmudical Academy of Baltimore
- Occupation: Member of the Moetzes Gedolei HaTorah, Rosh Kollel, Posek
- Known for: Shoshanas Yisroel on Hilchos Purim; Shabbos Shlomo on Hilchos Shabbos

Shlomo Eliyahu Miller is a member of the Moetzes Gedolei HaTorah (Council of Torah Sages). He is a Rosh Kollel (dean) and co-founder of the Kollel Avreichim Institute for Advanced Talmud Study, a haredi post-yeshiva educational institution in Toronto and head of its Beis Din (Rabbinical court). He is a Litvish Haredi Posek (decisor of Rabbinic law) in Toronto.

Miller is the head of the Beis Din of the Va'ad Harabonim of Lakewood (Association of Rabbis) of Lakewood, NJ and heads a Kollel there as well. He is a close friend of Rabbi Avraham Bromberg. Miller is a strong opponent of any weakening of the rule of Halacha (Rabbinic law).

== Personal life ==
=== Rabbinic history ===
Miller learned in the Talmudical Academy of Baltimore and was a close talmid (student) of Rav Aaron Kotler. He began deciding Halachic disputes after Rav Moshe Feinstein began referring halakhic disputes to him. He founded Kollel Toronto along with Rav Yaakov Hirschman in 1970.

=== Works ===
Shoshanas Yisroel on Hilchos Purim.

Shabbos Shlomo on Hilchos Shabbos.

== Some major rulings and statements ==
=== Shabbos mode ovens ===
Miller was a signatory to the ruling forbidding changing the temperature of Shabbos Mode ovens on Yom Tov.

=== Slifkin controversy ===
Miller wrote a letter voicing his support of the controversial ban of Natan Slifkin's books by a number of prominent rabbis. His defense of the rabbis and the ban was itself controversial, as evidenced by the responses it generated. Miller and Slifkin met in Toronto in December 2007. Slifkin reported that, despite their "strong disagreements", they had "a very pleasant conversation" in "a nice, polite atmosphere." Slifkin noted, however, that nothing was resolved.

=== Techeiles debate ===
Miller investigated the claim that the sea snail Murex trunculus was the source of the biblical techeiles. In a letter on the subject, he wrote that he believes that there are several Talmudic proofs that the Murex is not the creature from which techeiles is produced, and that the evidence in support of the claim is insufficient to overcome these points. R' Yisroel Barkin authored a comprehensive disputation of Miller's letter.
