= Kingsway College School =

Location
- 4600 Dundas Street West; Toronto, Ontario, M9A 1A5; Canada

Information
- Other name: KCS
- Type: Independent school
- Established: 1989
- Head of School: Garth Nichols
- Grades: Junior Kindergarten–Grade 12
- Gender: Coeducational
- Campus: Junior School and Senior School
- Website: www.kcs.on.ca

Kingsway College School (KCS) is a private, coeducational independent school in Toronto, Ontario, Canada. Founded in 1989, the school provides education from Junior Kindergarten through Grade 12. It operates two campuses in Etobicoke: the Junior School on Dundas Street West and the Senior School on Lake Shore Boulevard West.

== History ==
=== Founding and early development ===
Kingsway College School originated in 1987, when a group of parishioners from St. George's on-the-Hill proposed establishing an independent school in the local community.

A market research study conducted in 1988 identified support for the proposed school. Kingsway College School was subsequently incorporated in 1989.

The school opened in 1989 with 50 students divided among three classes: Grade 1, a combined Grades 2 and 3 class, and a combined Grades 4 and 5 class.

Additional grades were introduced in subsequent years until the school offered a complete elementary program from Grades 1 through 8.

=== Expansion of the Junior School ===
In December 1994, construction began on an addition containing a library and resource centre and two classrooms. The addition opened in September 1995.

During the 2001–2002 academic year, KCS began expanding to two classes per grade level. A six-room addition opened in March 2003.

By 2009, the school had completed the expansion to two classes per grade from Grades 1 through 8.

A third building addition was also completed in 2009. The new facilities included eight classrooms, a science laboratory, a multipurpose room, and two music rooms.

=== Early childhood education ===
In 2012, Kingsway College School amalgamated with St. George's Nursery School.

The school previously operated a half-day Pre-Kindergarten program, which continued until 2020. It subsequently offered full-time Junior Kindergarten and Senior Kindergarten programs.

=== Humbertown Park renovation ===
In 2019, Kingsway College School participated in a renovation of Humbertown Park in partnership with the City of Toronto, Tri Axis Construction, Seferian Design Group, Earthscape Play, and other organizations.

According to the school, the KCS community contributed approximately $1.5 million toward the renovation.

=== Senior School expansion ===
Planning for the Senior School expansion began in January 2017 with a task force consisting of 40 parents.

Following several years of planning and fundraising, Kingsway College School opened its Senior School campus on Lake Shore Boulevard West in September 2022.

The Senior School initially enrolled students in Grades 9 and 10, marking the school's expansion into secondary education.

The campus officially celebrated its opening in January 2023.

The expansion extended the school's educational offerings to Grade 12. The final phase of construction was completed during the 2024–2025 academic year.

=== First Senior School graduating class ===
Kingsway College School's first Grade 12 graduating class completed its studies in 2025.

According to a school publication, the inaugural graduating class consisted of 11 students who collectively received 61 university admission offers.

== Campuses ==
=== Junior School ===
The Junior School is located at 4600 Dundas Street West in Etobicoke, Toronto.

It serves students from Junior Kindergarten through Grade 8.

The campus includes classrooms, a library, science and innovation facilities, art and music rooms, and multipurpose learning spaces.

=== Senior School ===
The Senior School is located at 2183 Lake Shore Boulevard West in Etobicoke, near the Humber Bay shoreline of Lake Ontario.

The campus opened in September 2022 and serves students from Grades 9 through 12.

The Senior School's educational program incorporates experiential learning and opportunities to use Toronto and the surrounding region as learning environments.

== Academics ==
Kingsway College School provides education from Junior Kindergarten through Grade 12.

=== Junior School ===
The Junior School's educational framework, known as the Four Doors to Learning, incorporates four areas:

- Academics
- Arts
- Athletics
- Citizenship

The school also uses its Habits of Mind, Body, and Action framework, which addresses approaches to learning, personal development, and social responsibility.

=== Senior School ===
The Senior School provides education for students in Grades 9 through 12.

Its curriculum incorporates experiential learning, interdisciplinary activities, and student leadership opportunities.

The school uses a framework called KCS by Design, which incorporates creative problem-solving and innovation.

The Senior School also offers the KCS Path Program, which focuses on student responsibility, leadership, and preparation for post-secondary education.

=== School rules ===
Kingsway College School identifies three school rules:

- Respect
- Manners
- Try Your Best

These rules are incorporated into the school's approach to student conduct and community participation.

== Administration ==
Kingsway College School has been led by several heads of school since its establishment.

Its first Head of School was Hal Hannaford. Other former heads include David Richards, Glenn Zederayko, and Derek Logan.

Garth Nichols is the school's Head of School.

== Affiliations ==
Kingsway College School is accredited by Canadian Accredited Independent Schools and is a member of the Conference of Independent Schools of Ontario.

== See also ==
- Education in Toronto
- List of private schools in Ontario
- Conference of Independent Schools of Ontario
