= Toronto Institute of Pharmaceutical Technology =

Private college in Toronto, Canada

- Motto: Pioneering Professional Excellence & Certification
- Type: Private
- Established: 1992
- President: Alexander MacGregor
- Students: 180-200 Postgraduates
- Location: Toronto, Ontario, Canada; 43.774°N 79.254°W
- Campus: Urban
- Colours: Blue and White
- Nickname: TIPT
- Website: www.tipt.com

The Toronto Institute of Pharmaceutical Technology (TIPT) is a registered private career college located in Toronto, Ontario and is licensed by the Ontario Ministry of Training, Colleges and Universities. Toronto Institute of Pharmaceutical Technology a North American technology Institute providing specialized education and training in pharmaceutical sciences and technology. The Institute was established to provide the bridge between academia and industry delivering experiential training to science graduates. TIPT has over 4000 graduates who are qualified professionals.

== History ==
TIPT is the first pharmaceutical Institute registered in Canada by the Ministry of Training, Colleges & Universities of Ontario. Since its inception in 1992, Toronto Institute of Pharmaceutical Technology has provided education to science graduates and industry employees pharmaceutical multinationals such as GlaxoSmithKline, Patheon, Teva and Biovail. In this position, the Institute enhances the human resource capital of the pharmaceutical sector and also serves as a continuing source of knowledge.

== Training facilities ==
Toronto Institute of Pharmaceutical Technology provides practical training in Health Canada approved GMP facilities in the following areas:

Research & Development (Formulation) Laboratory: a multi-purpose laboratory for advanced pharmaceutical research including drug formulation development, controlled drug delivery dissolution testing, pre-formulation and micromeritis.

Quality Control (Testing) Laboratory: an analytical testing laboratory equipped with modern high performance liquid chromatography (HPLC) with advanced computer integration software, mass spectrometer (MS), ultraviolet-visible (UV-VIS) spectrophotometers, raw material and finished product testing equipment such as dosage form dissolution, disintegration, hardness and friability testing equipment.

Good Manufacturing Practices (GMP): The facilities include of various suites for drug production such as dispensary, mixing and blending, granulation, compression (tableting), capsulation, tablet coating, and solutions & suspension preparation.

== Collaboration ==
The Toronto Institute of Pharmaceutical Technology has collaborated with the following:

Industry Partner	Type of collaboration
Sick Kids Hospital, Canada	Formulation development
University of Kupio, Finland	Drug discovery
DCPC, Beijing, China	Formulation development
Orx Pharmaceutical, Canada	Drug delivery
AMS Long Island University	Academic
University of Guelph	Formulation development
University of Toronto	Formulation development
Zhenghou University, China	Academic
GlaxoSmithKline, Canada	Training
Patheon Inc., Canada	Training
Teva, Canada	Training
