= Dublin Heights =

School in Toronto, Ontario, Canada

Location
- 100 Bainbridge Avenue; Toronto, Ontario, M3H 2K2; Canada

Information
- Other names: Dublin
- School type: Elementary and Middle School
- Motto: Scholarship, Leadership, Character
- Established: c. 1823
- School board: Toronto District School Board (North York Board of Education)
- Superintendent: Domenic Giorgi; LN12
- Area trustee: Alexandra Lulka Rotman; Ward 5
- School number: 3102 / 950130
- Principal: Shari Green-Brown
- Grades: JK - 8
- Language: English
- Schedule type: Semestered
- Mascot: Tiger
- Website: www.tdsb.on.ca/Find-your/Schools/schno/3102

Dublin Heights is an Elementary and Middle School located in Toronto, Canada. The school was opened in 1823 and is managed by the Toronto District School Board.

== History ==
Dublin Heights, established in 1823 as "Dublin Hewights," was a high school from 1823 to 1959. The high school became a middle school in 1959 due to the addition of William Lyon Mackenzie Collegiate Institute to the area.

The school was named after the original name of the area, which was Dublin Hewights, and then Dublin Heights.

During Jan 2020,the school was in lock down like ever other school.

In 2024 during December another incident of antisemitic vandalism took place in the school's were numerous rocks thrown at windows throughout the year.

== Specialty programs ==
=== Gifted Program ===
The Dublin Heights Gifted Program is a program at Dublin Heights that puts kids who learn at an accelerated level into a different, more enriching curriculum. At Dublin Heights, there are only gifted programs for students in Grade 7 and 8.

== Sports ==
The school's sports teams include: volleyball, ultimate frisbee and basketball.

== Clubs and Councils ==
- Yearbook Committee
- Kids' Lit Quiz Team
  - The Kids' Lit Quiz Team at Dublin Heights is the 2024 competitor for the Kid's Lit Quiz international competition in Australia.
- Reading Club (Silver Birch and Red Maple)
- Band
- Student Council
