= The Beach School =

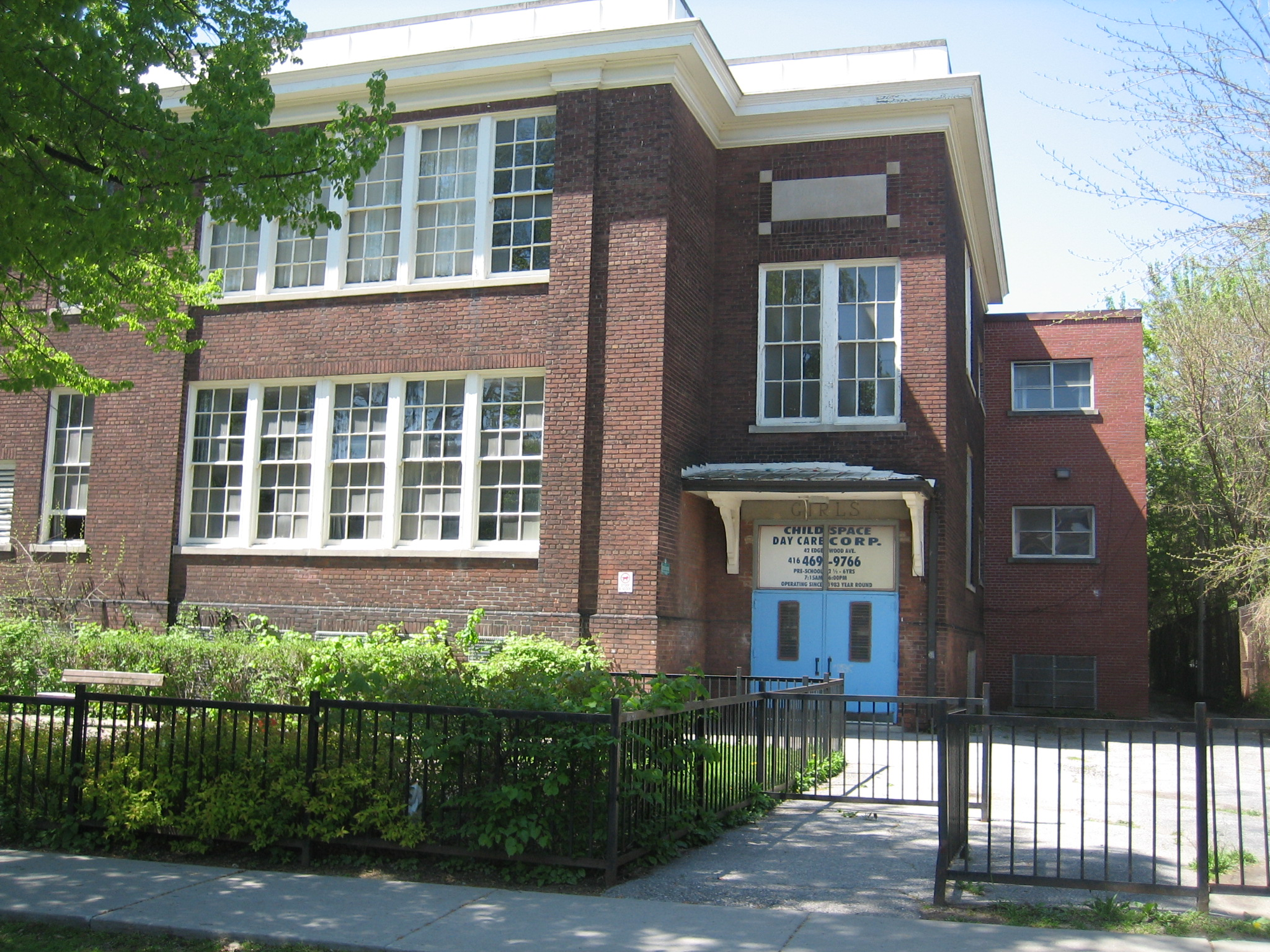
- The main building
- 42 Edgewood Avenue; Toronto, ON; Canada

Information
- Established: 2003
- Closed: 2008
- Grades: JK-12 (ungraded, ages 4+)
- Campus type: urban
- Philosophy: Sudbury
- Governance: School Meeting (democratic, vote by students and staff)

The Beach School was a democratic free school in Toronto based on the Sudbury principles of education. The model has two basic tenets: educational freedom and democratic governance. Small and independent, The Beach School was a community of self-motivated learners, aged 4–19, who determined their own curriculum, and each had an equal voice in school governance. Located at 42 Edgewood Ave near Kingston Road and Dundas Street East, the school opened in the fall of 2003 and closed in June 2008 owing to a shortage of students. The Beach School was incorporated as a co-operative and, at the time of closing, was one of two Sudbury schools in Canada; the only one in Ontario.

Some participants of The Beach School are part of a group attempting to open a similar school called Reach Sudbury School of Toronto.

== History ==
Modelled after the Sudbury Valley School in Massachusetts, which opened in 1968, The Beach School community believed that learning which is initiated and pursued by the learner happens naturally, meaningfully, and enduringly. As such, there was no set curriculum at the school; instead individual curiosity and self-initiation directed learning. Beach School students were trusted with their own education and were free to draw from the school's resources as much or as little as they saw fit. The Beach School encouraged self-evaluation; there were no grades, tests, or assignments unless desired. This educational approach was based on the Sudbury belief that everyone is instinctively curious; therefore, when trusted to do so, they will discover independently the knowledge and experiences they need, becoming self-aware and resourceful in the process.

== Tuition ==
Because the Ontario Ministry of Education does not fund independent schools, The Beach School charged tuition in order to fund the basic operations of the school. The decision on what amount to charge was made each year by the assembly. The Beach School was recognized by the Children's First Foundation through the Fraser Institute, which provides grants for education to disadvantaged families.

== See also ==
- List of Sudbury schools
- Education reform
- Anarchist free school
- Alternative Education
