= North Toronto Christian School =

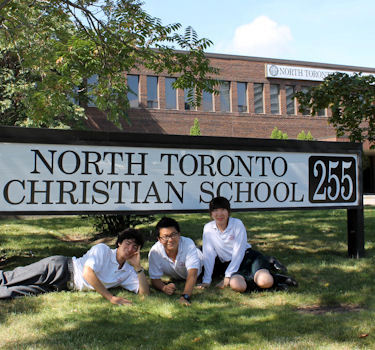

Location
- 255 Yorkland Blvd; North York, Toronto, Ontario, M2J 1S3; Canada; 43.77348°N 79.33757°W

Information
- School type: Christian School
- Religious affiliation: Christian
- Administrator: Gordon Cooke
- Principal: Nicole Brouwer
- Vice principal: David Vant Erve
- Grades: Junior Kindergarten - Grade 12
- Language: English
- Website: www.ntcs.on.ca

North Toronto Christian School (NTCS) is a non-semestered private Christian school located in the North York district of Toronto, Ontario, Canada. The school is a co-educational Christian elementary and high school, not affiliated with any specific church or denomination. Space is offered for both domestic and international students, along with an accompanying ESL and homestay program.

North Toronto Christian School is a member of the Association of Christian Schools International.

== History ==
North Toronto Christian School was founded in 1981.

NTCS originally occupied the former Page Public School building, which was closed as an operating school by the North York Board of Education (later Toronto District School Board) in 1981. Its first lease was for five years and was terminated on July 31, 2011. The Page Avenue property was sold to a private owner. Formerly called The Yorkland School, the high school adopted the elementary school's name, North Toronto Christian School, during a merger between the two schools at the beginning of the 2011/2012 school year.

From March 13, 2020, to the end of the 2019–2020 school year, the school building was closed due to the COVID-19 pandemic in Toronto. The school used online learning during that time.

== Property ==
North Toronto Christian School is situated on a 5-acre (20,000 m^{2}) campus near the intersection of Highway 401 and Highway 404 in North York, an area of Toronto. It occupies a former commercial office building and fitness centre with a total of 80,000 square feet (7,400 m^{2}) of space on two floors. Evidence of the building's past can still be seen in some areas throughout the building.

High school classrooms are numbered N1-N6, C1-C8, and S1 (N for North, C for Central Square, and S for South).

There is a music classroom in room N6, and science classrooms in rooms N3-N5.

In 2010–2011, the building was renovated and expanded to accommodate elementary school students and staff. The elementary school building, which was rented from the Toronto District School Board, was demolished in 2011, as the property was sold by the TDSB to a property developer.

== Technology ==
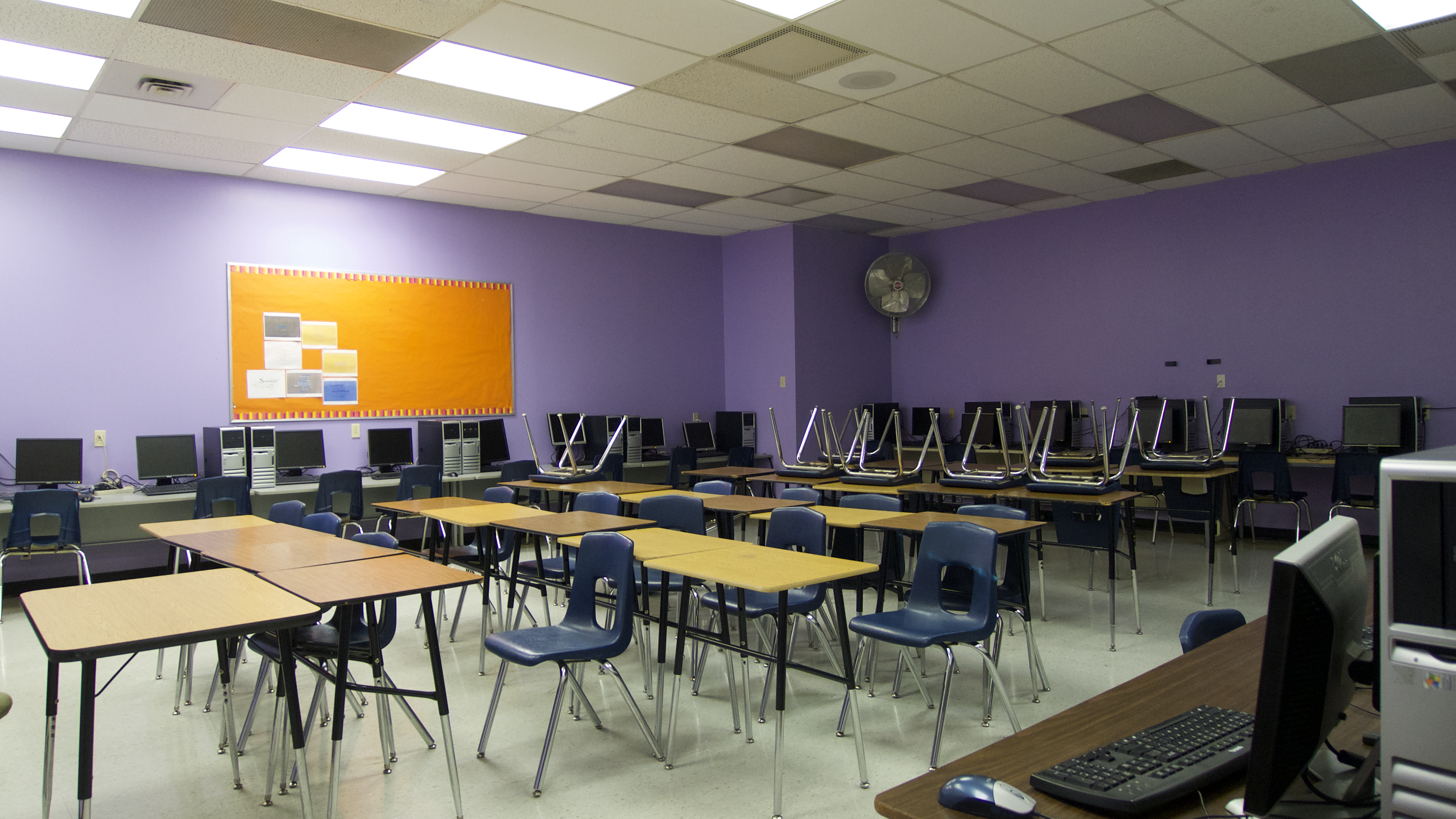
One of NTCS's computer labs, room C6. The computers in the photo were replaced in 2018.

There are three computer labs with Internet access in rooms C4, C6, and C8. All computers in the computer labs run on Windows 10 Home and have Microsoft Office 2007 and LibreOffice installed, along with tools for programming in Python and Java. There are no student libraries, however, the Toronto Public Library's Fairview branch is 1.5km away.

== Daily schedule ==
The school day at North Toronto Christian School begins at 9:00a.m. The high school day ends at 3:30p.m., whilst the elementary school day ends at 3:15p.m. Uniforms are required. Chapel is usually held every other Wednesday after period one for the high school students and after homeroom for the grade 7 to 9 students. Schedule days are numbered Day 1–4, with 6 periods of 50 minutes in length each day, as well as a 40-minute lunch break between periods 3 and 4, 10-minute homeroom time (where announcements are read out and devotions are done) between periods 2 and 3, and a 5-minute gap between other periods. Grades 11-12 also have spare periods; they may leave the school or work in the café area on the first floor during these periods.

== Athletic facilities ==
Many of the fitness facilities, such as the swimming pool, track, and squash courts, are remnants of the school's past as a fitness centre.

- Indoor swimming pool
- Three squash courts
- Two indoor half basketball courts
- Soccer field
- Indoor track
- Weight training area
- Aerobic area
- Playground
- Outdoor Basketball/ball hockey court

== Extracurricular activities ==
Sports teams include volleyball, soccer, basketball, swimming and more. These sports teams are available to both the junior grades and the senior grades. There are other teams, such as the DECA team and a service and leadership team (SALT), and the school's Reach for the Top team which qualified for the Ontario provincial finals in the 2018–2019 school year.

== Chandos Outdoor Education Centre ==
Chandos Outdoor Education Centre is a camp property owned and operated by North Toronto Christian School. Twice a year, students from grades 3 to 9 take an overnight trip there, in the fall and in the winter. Once a year, students in grade 10 take an overnight trip there, in the fall. Each class, accompanied by teachers (and parents for younger grades), goes once in the fall and once in the winter. Chandos Outdoor Education Centre is located outside Apsley, Ontario, on Chandos Lake. In the summer, a summer camp, Camp Ke-Mon-Oya, is operated there.

== Notable alumni ==
- Stefanie Reid: Paralympian
- Arda Zakarian: General News Anchor, CP24
- Jordan Romano: Pitcher, Toronto Blue Jays

== See also ==
- Education in Ontario
- List of secondary schools in Ontario
