= The Model Railroad Club of Toronto =

Model railroad club

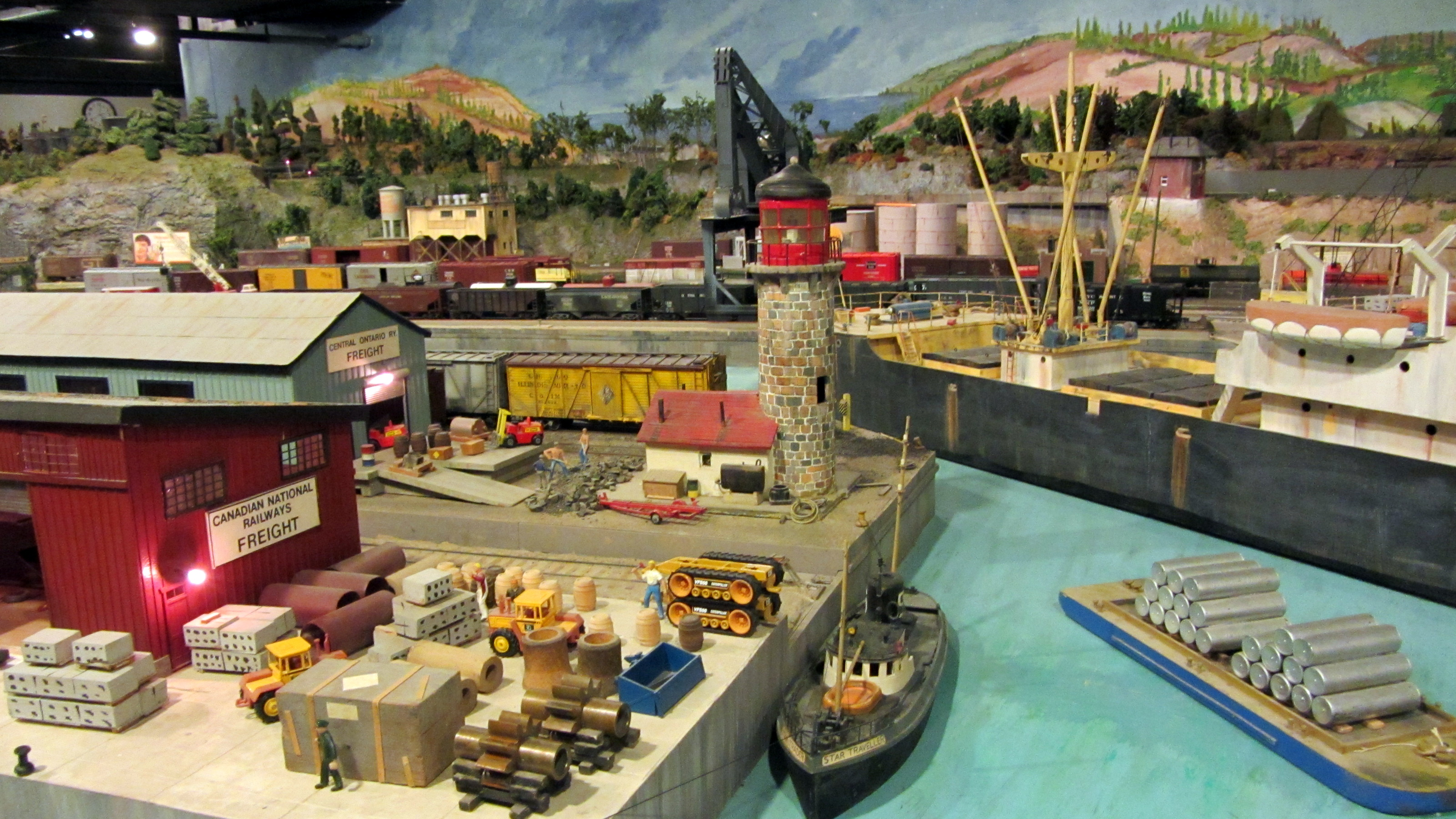
A model port at the Model Railroad Club of Toronto

The Model Railroad Club of Toronto (MRCT) is an O scale model railroad club founded in 1938 by Harry Ebert and Borden Lilley.

== History ==
Originally located in founder Ebert's basement, the MRCT soon moved to new premises at Toronto's Union Station. After World War II, the railways annexed the space the Club occupied and in January 1946, the Club moved to premises in the basement of 171 East Liberty Street in what is now part of Toronto's Liberty Village neighbourhood.

Since the mid-1960s the Club has built and operated its layout as the Central Ontario Railway.

In the spring of 2013, the club's Liberty Village home was overtaken by gentrification of the once industrial neighborhood, and the club has relocated to 11 Curity Avenue, Toronto.

== Annual Public Show days ==
The Club hosts Annual Shows (open to the public) in December and February and on the Family Day holiday. Check the Club's Official website for dates.
