= Halton High School =

High school in Toronto, Canada

Halton High School is a coeducational, private university/college preparatory secondary school in the city of Toronto, Ontario, Canada. Located in the Birchcliff community in the south eastern section of the city, Halton High School is registered and inspected by the Ontario Ministry of Education (BSID #882713) and offers a program leading to the Ontario Secondary School Diploma. Originally located in the Halton Region west of Toronto, the school offers a range of educational services including secondary school credit courses, course upgrades, tutoring, and guidance in University and College applications. Access to professional counseling and complete psycho-educational assessments is provided if needed.

HHS bases its approach to education on applying the "whole student", outcomes based approach in its instruction, in addition to its focus on individual planning for each student. In order to apply this approach, HHS works closely with specialists in the areas of Special Education, Experiential Education and Educational Psychology, in order to ensure that each student is able to access the accommodations necessitated by their learning profile and the appropriate stimulation in the classroom.

== Curriculum ==
Halton High School follows the curriculum guidelines established by the Ontario Ministry of Education offering courses at the College, University-College and University Preparatory levels along with opportunities for enriched studies through Advanced Placement courses. In addition to its academic offerings, the School offers a full ESL language program and IELTS test preparation for international students.
