= Toronto Prep School =

Coordinates: 43.70063°N 79.3864°W

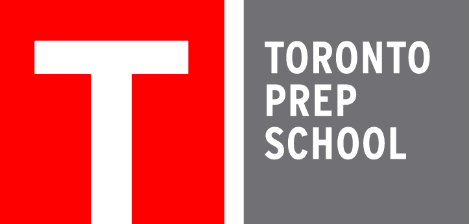

Location
- 250 Davisville Avenue; Toronto, Ontario; Canada

Information
- Type: Private
- Motto: "Engaging Minds."
- Established: 2009
- Principal: Pete Tsimikalis
- Faculty: 35
- Enrollment: 450 Students
- Campus: Urban
- Colors: Red, White, and Gray.
- Mascot: Spartan
- Website: www.torontoprepschool.com

Toronto Prep School (TPS) is a private school in Toronto, Ontario that was founded in 2009. Toronto Prep School is a Grade 7 through 12, coeducational, private, day school situated on an urban campus in the heart of Toronto near Mount Pleasant Road and Davisville Ave. The school is accredited by the Ontario Ministry of Education. The total enrollment for 2019-20 was 450 students, Grades 7–12.

== Academics ==
According to their website, Toronto Prep School is dedicated to an academic program that stimulates, inspires and challenges its students. Knowledge and skill acquisition form the basis of academics. Additionally, carefully planned experiences leading to the awe of discovery, observation, and exploration are key components of the learning process in all disciplines and in all classroom settings.

Academic courses offered in grades 7 and 8 are Mathematics, Computers, Art, English Literature, French, Physical Education, Drama, and Integrated Technologies.
