= United Synagogue Day School =

Robbins Hebrew Academy

Location
- Toronto, Ontario; Canada; 43.77871°N 79.39212°W

Information
- School type: Private
- Religious affiliation: Conservative Jewish
- Founded: 1957
- Oversight: Board of Jewish Education of Toronto
- President: Jenny Frisch
- Head of school: Claire Sumerlus
- Grades: Nursery to 8
- Enrollment: 400
- Language: English, Hebrew, French
- Campus: Urban
- Colours: Blue and White
- Website: www.rhacademy.ca

Robbins Hebrew Academy (RHA), formerly known as United Synagogue Day School, is a private elementary (Nursery to Grade 5) and middle school (Grade 6 to Grade 8) Jewish day school in Toronto, Ontario.

Founded in 1957 as the Foundation Day School at the Beth Tzedec Synagogue, it was renamed United Synagogue Day School in 1961. In 2010, after an endowment, the school changed its name to Robbins Hebrew Academy, as a condition to accepting the endowment, by Larry Robbins. It was the first Jewish Day School in Toronto to be CAIS (www.cais.ca) accredited.

== Notable alumni ==
- Zach Hyman (born 1992), professional hockey player on the Edmonton Oilers and award-winning author
- Kenny Hotz (born 1967), Canadian comedy writer, filmmaker, entertainer and television personality
