= The Leo Baeck Day School =

School in Ontario, Canada

Leo Baeck Day School
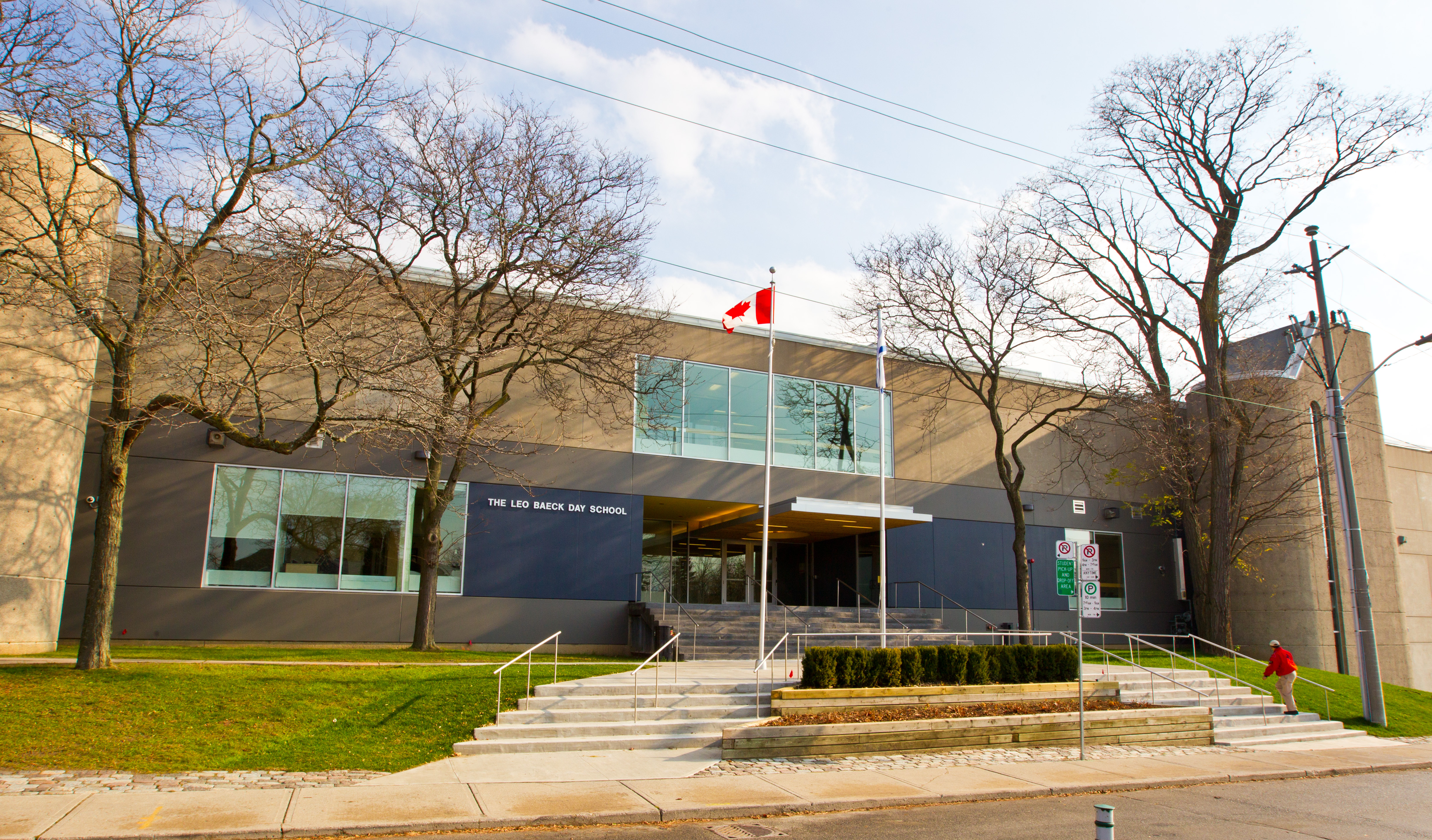
- We see the world in your child
- Ontario; Canada

Information
- School type: Jewish day school
- Religious affiliation: Reform Judaism
- Founded: 1974
- Rabbi: Noam Katz
- Head of school: Eric Petersiel
- Grades: JK-8
- Enrollment: 900 (2019)
- Language: English, Hebrew, French
- Colors: Blue, White, Gold
- Website: www.leobaeck.ca

South Campus

Location
- 501 Arlington Ave; Toronto, Ontario, M6C 3A4; Canada; 43.6923°N 79.4330°W

Information
- Principal: Adina Lubek

The Leo Baeck Day School is a Greater Toronto Area Reform Jewish day school in Ontario, Canada composed of around nine hundred students from Nursery to Grade Eight. Named in honour of Rabbi Leo Baeck, it has one campus in Toronto and formerly one campus in Vaughan.

In October 2018, The Leo Baeck Day School announced they were closing their Vaughan campus at the end of the 2018-19 school year due to a lack of enrollment.

== General ==
Leo Baeck is the only Jewish IB (International Baccalaureate) World School and the largest Reform Jewish day school in Canada.

The school is run by the Head of School, Eric Petersiel, the principal, Adina Lubek, and a Board of Directors, composed of parents and members of the community. The school is affiliated with the Centre for Jewish Education of the UJA Federation of Greater Toronto, the Union for Reform Judaism, and PARDeS, the Progressive Association of Reform Day Schools.

The school includes Junior Kindergarten through Grade 8. Leo Baeck publishes "Baeck and Call" a bi-annual magazine that showcases the school and its community.

== School history ==
The Leo Baeck Day School opened in 1974 at Toronto’s Temple Emanu-El with fewer than 40 students. Morris Sorin was the founding Director. The founding parents envisioned a school with a reputation for excellence in both general and Jewish studies, attracting liberal Jewish families, including those who had never before considered Jewish day school education. The School was supported and funded by Reform synagogues across Toronto with the vision that it would model and teach the core values of Reform Judaism. With growth and the need for more room, the School moved to Temple Sinai and then to the portable classroom facilities near York Mills Collegiate. Next, the School moved to Kenton Drive Public School – a surplus Toronto District School Board (TDSB) building.

In 1994, the school found a permanent home at 36 Atkinson Avenue in Thornhill. At the time, the space was built as a centre for Reform Judaism and included facilities for CCRJ and community mikvah (still in use) in addition to the day school. The North Campus moved further north to Jewish Community Centre at Rutherford and Bathurst due to dwindling enrolment. Eventually the North Campus closed in 2018 with remaining students either moving to other local schools or being bussed to the Toronto campus.

The South Campus opened in 1992 at the Holy Blossom Temple, with fewer than 20 students. Steady growth of the South Campus over an 11-year period created the need for an independent facility and in the fall of 2012, the school moved into the newly renovated facility that was formerly the Arlington Middle School. A year before, Leo Baeck purchased the building when it became surplus by the Toronto District School Board. The move brought enrolment from 360 to 455 in one year, including three new Junior Kindergarten classes, extra Senior Kindergarten and an additional Grade 1 class.

=== New direction ===
In January 2011, the school was accepted as an official International Baccalaureate school for the Middle School years. The introduction of This transition to becoming an IB School culminated with the school being accepted as into IB's Primary Years Programme. Since the initiation of the International Baccalaureate Program, the school has taken a more progressive approach to learning, including the introduction of technology in the curriculum. That consists of the installation of a SMARTBoard in every classroom, hard-wired and mobile computer labs used by all grades - including dedicated one-to-one Chrome OS devices for students from grade 3 to 5, iPads for students from Kindergarten through Grade 2, use of web-based technology to enable cross-campus planning and collaboration, and the development of a new IB-based Middle School Technology course that was implemented in 2010-2011. In 2017, the school achieved accreditation as a Canadian Accredited Independent School (CAIS). The CAIS seal denotes commitment to going above and beyond in delivering an effective and impactful education by evaluating every aspect of the school’s operations.

New North campus and closing of North campus

In November 2016, the school announced that its North Campus would move locations to the Kimel Family Education Centre, to share space with TanenbaumCHAT before the 2017-18 year. This was an attempt to increase both schools' declining enrolment. Instead, the move brought down enrolment from an already small 210 to 140. In result, the school shut down the next year. The building has now been changed to the Kayla's Children Centre, a school specializing in children with disabilities.
