= Hudson College =

Location
- 21 Ascot Ave; Toronto, Ontario, M6E 1E6; 43.6797°N 79.4442°W

Information
- School type: Private
- Motto: Be yourself, be anything
- Established: 2003
- Head of school: Jack Bavington (Upper School Director), Rose Bastien (Lower School Principal)
- Grades: JK – 12
- Enrollment: 440
- Colour: Navy Blue Royal Blue Gold
- Athletics: SSAF
- Mascot: Husky
- Website: www.hudsoncollege.ca

Hudson College is a co-educational, non-denominational private school for students from Junior Kindergarten to Grade 12. It is situated on a 4.5-acre campus in the former Earlscourt Junior Public School in central Toronto, Ontario.

== History ==
Hudson College was established in early 2003. One of the school's founders, Jack Bavington, serves as the Upper School Director. Prior to his current role, Jack worked as a principal at a large collegiate institute in Scarborough. His son, Jeff Bavington, and also a school founder, is the Lower School Director. Rose Bastien serves as the Lower School Principal.

The school is housed in the former Earlscourt Junior Public School and leased from the Toronto District School Board, which also leases part of the building to the Toronto Catholic District School Board for Stella Maris Catholic School.

== Programs ==
Hudson College is a fully accredited school recognized by the Ontario Ministry of Education and a member of the Ontario Reggio Association. The education curriculum offers courses from Junior Kindergarten to Grade 12, pre-university programs.

=== Lower School ===
At the Lower School level (Junior Kindergarten through Grade 8), students are engaged in a rigorous academic program with Saxon Math, Language Arts, Science, and other subjects over a recurring eight-day schedule. The Junior and Senior Kindergarten full-day programs are inspired by the methodologies of the Reggio Emilia teaching philosophy. This pedagogy encourages children to explore, investigate and grow. The Reggio Emilia approach to teaching originated in Northern Italy and is founded on the belief that children's curiosity about their world, as well as their innate sense of creativity, should guide their learning.

Lower School students may participate in many different extra-curricular clubs and activities throughout the course of a school year. Students from JK to Grade 4 participate in two co-curricular programs within the school year: an instructional skating program, followed by an instructional swimming program. Students receive level certifications through the official CanSkate and Ultra Swim accreditation programs. There are also camp trips to the Muskoka area, end-of-year visits to Quebec City and Ottawa, and other field trips during the course of the year such as a ski trip to Blue Mountain.

The Middle School Preparatory Program (Grades 6–8) teaches students executive functioning skills such as time management, organization and study habits, as well as critical thinking and test-taking skills to prepare students for entry to High School.

=== Upper School ===
At the Upper School level (Grades 9 through 12), Hudson College uses the standard Ontario curriculum to prepare students for university placement. They will receive the Ontario Secondary School Diploma upon completing their full range of school credits.

Students follow a semi-flexible three-semester curriculum starting in Grade 9. The Fall semester begins in September and ends in December, where students enroll in up to four courses. The Winter semester begins during January and ends within April, where students again may enroll in up to three courses. The Spring semester takes place between May and June, where students may enroll in up to two courses.

Beginning in Grade 8, all students and staff are part of a House System, with each House representing a major geographical area of Canada. The Houses include The Maritimes (Crimson Red), The Great Lakes (Royal Blue), The Prairies (Kelly Green), and The Rockies (Purple). Each House competes for the year-end awarding of the Discovery Trophy.

The Upper School offers a variety of clubs and activities as well as excursions within the province and internationally.

Upper School students may also take part in the Duke of Edinburgh program.

== Athletics ==
Sporting amenities at Hudson College include a semi-modern gymnasium and outdoor recreational facilities, with a multi-sport turf field and running track. The school's sports teams are known as the Hudson Huskies.

Hudson College is part of the Small Schools Athletic Federation (SSAF). The SSAF calendar is divided into three athletic sessions – Fall, Winter, and Spring – with opportunities in either individual and/or team sports in each session. Hudson has won 19 banners in various SSAF sports. The school participates in 18 individual and team sports each year.

Hudson's uniform colours are navy blue, royal blue, and gold.
