= Bialik Hebrew Day School =

Location
- 2760 Bathurst Street; Toronto, Ontario, M6B 3A1; Canada; 43°42′39.07″N 79°25′43.58″W

Information
- School type: Private Jewish day school
- Motto: ״פה בית היוצר לנשמת האומה״ (in Hebrew) ("Here the soul of the people is forged")
- Founded: 1961; 65 years ago
- School board: Toronto Board of Jewish Education
- Head of School: Jake Gallinger
- Grades: Kindergarten-8
- Enrollment: 1008 (2016)
- Language: English, Hebrew, Yiddish, French
- Website: bialik.ca

Bialik Hebrew Day School (Hebrew: בֵּית סֵפֶר יוֹמִי עַל שֵׁם ח.נ. בְּיַאלִיק) is a private, Jewish day school located in Toronto, Ontario, Canada. It is one of the few day schools in Toronto's Board of Jewish Education to teach Yiddish, beginning in grade 3.

== History ==
Bialik Hebrew Day School was established in 1961 with 54 students and four staff members by members of the Labour Zionist movement, with Moishe Mendachovsky as its first principal. By 1975, enrollment had increased to 550 students and 52 staff.

The school was named in honour of the poet Chaim Nachman Bialik. It has four "houses" named after Israeli universities: Bar-Ilan/Tel-Aviv, Ben-Gurion/Weizmann, Hebrew University, and Haifa/Technion.

Uniquely, the school's Jewish and General Studies programs teach students four different languages: Hebrew, English, Yiddish and French.
