= Talpiot College (Toronto) =

- Established: 1973
- Religious affiliation: Bais Yaakov
- Location: 410 Lawrence Ave West, Toronto, Ontario, Canada; 43°43′15″N 79°25′25″W
- Colours: Purple and gold ;
- Website: www.talpiot.ca
- Location in Toronto

Talpiot College is a Jewish post-secondary educational institution in Toronto, Ontario, Canada.

== History ==
In 1960, Beth Jacob High School was started as the first Jewish High School for girls in Ontario.

In 1969, Beth Jacob Teachers’ Seminary, a post-graduate institute, was founded. In 1996, Beth Jacob Academy/Maalot Toronto, through association with Maalot Yerushalayim, was founded as an affiliate to the existing Beth Jacob institutions to provide education for Jewish women.

In March 1997, a charter application was made to the Ontario Ministry of Education and Training, Universities Branch to create Talpiot College from the combination of the existing Beth Jacob Teachers’ Seminary and Beth Jacob Academy, that would receive degree-granting authority from the Ontario legislature. The Ministry issued their approval of Talpiot College on December 16, 1999, and the Talpiot College Act subsequently received Royal Assent on June 23, 2000 to operate a post-secondary educational institution in Jewish and general studies for Jewish women.

The Talpiot College Act, 2006 enabled Talpiot College to provide post-secondary education in Jewish and general studies to both women and men.

== Affiliations ==
Talpiot's degrees have been reviewed and accredited by World Education Services (WES), a credential and transcript evaluation services in the United States.

== Programs ==
Talpiot College offers programs in accounting, education/special education, interior design, Judaic Studies, philosophy and science.

- Bachelor of Jewish Education
- Bachelor of Jewish Education (Special Education)
- Bachelor of Judaic Studies (Science)
- Bachelor of Judaic Studies (Accounting)
- Bachelor of Judaic Studies (Interior Design)
