= Tiferes Bais Yaakov =

Location
- 85 Stormont Avenue; Toronto, Ontario, M5N 2C3; Canada; 43.718416°N 79.428595°W

Information
- Religious affiliation: Jewish Orthodox
- Established: 2000
- Head of School/Menahel: Shmuel Zilber
- Jewish Studies Principal: Adina Ribacoff
- General Studies Principal: Fraidy Shachter
- Grades: 9–12
- Language: English, Hebrew
- Website: www.tiferesbaisyaakov.com
- Last updated: 2021

Tiferes Bais Yaakov is a private Jewish school in Toronto, Ontario.

== History ==
The school was founded in 2000 with 19 students. By 2013, it had 150 students.
