= Associated Hebrew Schools of Toronto =

Coordinates: 43°46′30″N 79°26′18″W

- Toronto, Ontario; Canada

Information
- School type: Private
- Religious affiliation: Jewish
- Founded: 1907
- Oversight: Board of Jewish Education of Toronto
- Head of School: Dr. Lee-Ron Kaye
- Grades: Nursery–5 (Posluns); Nursery–5 (Kamin); 6–8 (Danilack)
- Enrollment: ~ 1,000
- Language: English, Hebrew, French
- Campus: Urban
- Website: associatedhebrewschools.com

Associated Hebrew Schools of Toronto (Hebrew: בית ספר קהילתי אסוסיאייטד) is a private traditional Jewish day school with campuses in Toronto, Ontario. Its three branches are: Kamin Elementary School at the Hurwich Education Centre (252 Finch Ave. W), the Posluns Education Centre (18 Neptune Drive), and Danilack Middle School at the Hurwich Education Centre (252 Finch Ave. W). Founded in 1907, it was incorporated as a not-for-profit organization in 1922.

== History ==
In 1907, the Simcoe Street Talmud Torah was founded as a part of the Toronto Hebrew Religious School, run by Rabbi Jacob Gordon. The school was renamed to Associated Hebrew Schools of Toronto in 1910.

In 1919, under the inspired leadership of Rabbi Jacob Gordon, a community committee raised $90,000 for the purchase of a lot on Brunswick Avenue, where the Brunswick Avenue Talmud Torah was subsequently built and opened in 1925.

During the Great Depression, the school was forced to close temporarily in 1935 for lack of funds, with a full year's salary owing to the teaching staff. The school was rescued through an emergency fundraising campaign led by community members, and subsequently re-established on a firm financial basis.

When the United Jewish Welfare Fund was organized in 1937, the Associated Hebrew Schools was among its first agencies.

In 1941, Associated opened a preschool known as Bet Hayeled and in 1943, its first day school Grade 1 class, which began with approximately 25 pupils and grew to close to 600 by the mid-1950s. In 1945 a Hebrew High School was opened in a building provided by the Women's Auxiliary of the Talmud Torah, with classes functioning at the Brunswick Talmud Torah, at Shaarei Shomayim, and at North Bathurst. AHS opened the Neptune campus (since 1998 known as the Posluns Education Centre) in 1952, the Hurwich Education Centre in 1972, the Danilack Middle School on Leslie in 1982, and the Kamin Education Centre in 1995.

In 2003 the Hurwich Education Centre was rebuilt and merged with the Danilack Middle School.

== Notable educators ==
Among the school's most notable educators was Jack Burke, who joined the staff in September 1937 and served as Teacher and Principal of the Junior High School for over forty years, retiring in 1980. A lifetime member of the Board of Directors, Burke was described by the Associated Hebrew Schools upon his retirement as an educator whose name had become "synonymous with Jewish education in the Jewish community of the City of Toronto." At the time of his retirement, the school had grown to a student body of approximately 3,000, making it one of the largest Jewish day school networks outside Israel.

== Campuses ==
=== Danilack Middle School at the Hurwich Education Centre ===
The Hurwich Education Centre was originally built in September 1971. It was originally an Elementary School. It is named after Nathan O. and Roey Hurwich. Later they renovated and named the inside of the building to the Danilack Middle School, named after Abba and Esther Danilack. The principal is Kevin Knopman and the Vice Principal is Faye Rewald.

=== Kamin Elementary School at the Hurwich Education Centre ===
The Kamin Education Centre, named after Jack and Bushie Kamin, was built in 1995. It is an elementary school. Currently, the principal is Kevin Knopman. In September 2019, the Kamin Elementary Centre moved to join Danilack Middle School at the Hurwich Education Centre.

=== Posluns Education Centre ===
The Posluns Education Centre is a Nursery and Elementary School. It is named after Louis and Leah Posluns. The principal is Cindy Closner.
