= Metropolitan Preparatory Academy =

Location
- 1 Duncan Mill Road; Toronto, Ontario, M3B 1Z2; Canada; 43.760957°N 79.357772°W

Information
- Type: Private day and university-preparatory
- Founded: 1982
- Principal: Ryan Seeley
- Grades: 7-12
- Team name: Predators
- Website: www.metroprep.com

Metropolitan Preparatory Academy (commonly known as "Metro Prep") is a private, semestered, co-educational, middle school and high school located in Toronto, Ontario. It serves students from Grades 7 through 12 and offers a university preparatory curriculum. Founded in 1982, the school emphasizes small class sizes and individualized support, and is a Candidate School for the International Baccalaureate (IB) Diploma Programme.

In addition to regular classrooms, Metro Prep's facilities include a biotechnology laboratory, theatre, three computer labs, an art room, cafeteria, study hall, lounge, and gymnasium. Metro Prep also offers a fully operational weight and fitness room.

== History ==
Metropolitan Preparatory Academy was established in 1982 by Wayne McKelvey as an independent private school focused on providing a supportive academic environment for university-bound students. Over the decades, the school has developed a reputation for nurturing creativity, critical thinking, and personal growth. In 2025, the school began major campus expansions, occupying a 65,000 square foot facility at 1 Duncan Mill Road in North York.

== Campus and Facilities ==
The school is located on a 3.65-acre campus in North York, near major public transportation routes. The facility includes science and biotechnology labs, art studios, music and drama rooms, a library, and a student lounge. A new gymnasium and expanded athletic complex are currently under development, with construction scheduled to begin in 2025.

== Academics ==
Metro Prep offers the Ontario Secondary School Diploma (OSSD) and follows the curriculum set by the Ontario Ministry of Education. Courses are offered at the academic, open, and university preparation levels. Class sizes range from 6 to 14 students, allowing for personalized instruction.

The school emphasizes academic excellence, critical thinking, and the development of strong writing and analytical skills across disciplines including English, mathematics, sciences, social sciences, arts, and business studies.

In 2025, Metropolitan Preparatory Academy became a Candidate School for the International Baccalaureate® (IB) Diploma Programme.

== Signature Programs ==
Metro Prep offers four distinct signature programs designed to provide students with enriched academic and personal development opportunities beyond the core curriculum.

GENIUS Program: The GENIUS Program is Toronto’s first high school biotechnology stream. It introduces students to university-level scientific inquiry, with lab-based work including DNA extraction, PCR amplification, CRISPR simulations, and genetic analysis. The program integrates guest lectures, research projects, and bioethics discussions, preparing students for future studies in STEM fields such as molecular biology, environmental science, and biomedical research.

SMITH Program: The SMITH (School of Music, Integrated Arts, Theatre & Humanities) Program offers students a conservatory-style education in the arts and humanities. It includes coursework in creative writing, drama, visual arts, and music, alongside interdisciplinary projects that explore social issues. Students regularly participate in performances, exhibitions, and cross-curricular workshops that promote critical thinking and creative expression.

Momentum Program: Serving Grades 7 and 8, the Momentum Program focuses on middle school readiness with an emphasis on leadership, communication, and academic preparation for high school. It integrates project-based learning and early exposure to Metro Prep’s high school programs, including introductory experiences in STEM, global issues, and the arts.

Impact Program: A school-wide leadership and service initiative, the Impact Program encourages students to engage in community outreach, social entrepreneurship, and civic engagement. Students design and lead advocacy campaigns, fundraising initiatives, and awareness events tied to local and global challenges. Projects have included Truth and Reconciliation campaigns, anti-bullying initiatives, and student-designed charity merchandise. The program reflects Metro Prep’s broader emphasis on ethics, purpose, and global citizenship.

== Athletics ==
Metro Prep offers year-round athletic programs, and is a member of the Small Schools Athletic Federation (SSAF) and a charter member of the Toronto District College Athletic Association (TDCAA). Metro Prep sports teams compete with schools throughout the region.

Current sports teams include basketball, softball, volleyball, hockey, skiing, snowboarding, cross-country, golf, tennis, soccer, rugby, ultimate, and track and field.

== Extracurricular activities ==
Metro Prep offers a wide range of extracurricular activities, including mountain biking, caving and white-water rafting, theatre trips, dog sledding expeditions, science camps, clubs (including robotics and chess), theatrical production, trips to Amazon River, Chimborazo, Ecuador, Tanzania, Kenya, Belize, and Sri Lanka, and much more.

== Lore the Lion ==
Metro Prep’s mascot, Lore the Lion, was inspired by a humanitarian trip to Tanzania where students helped build a school foundation. The name "Lore" reflects the concept of folklore—stories passed down with meaning and values. The lion, originally seen on a reused concrete bag during the trip, symbolizes resilience, leadership, and community spirit. A framed canvas of the original lion image hangs in the school.

== Notable grads ==
- John Brunswick (2003)
- Matt McKay (2005)
- Kate Ruby-Sachs (2003)
- Eden Grinshpan (2004)
- Roxy Kirshenbaum (2005)
- Brad Silverberg (2008)
- Brian Vadasz (2008)
