= Board of Jewish Education (Toronto) =

Coordinates: 43°45′45″N 79°26′30″W

The Board of Jewish Education (BJE) of Toronto, Ontario is the education department of UJA Federation of Greater Toronto, and is an administrative body that offers direction to the Greater Toronto Area's Jewish schools. In 2007 The BJE was replaced by Mercaz, The Centre for Enhancement of Jewish Education.
