= Kenny vs. Spenny vs. Canada =

Comedy tour

- Comedy tour by Kenny Hotz and Spencer Rice
- Location: Canada
- Start date: March 31, 2014
- End date: May 15, 2014
- No. of shows: 14

Kenny vs. Spenny vs. Canada was a comedy tour starring Kenny Hotz and Spencer Rice, creators of the Canadian comedy television series Kenny vs. Spenny.

== The tour ==
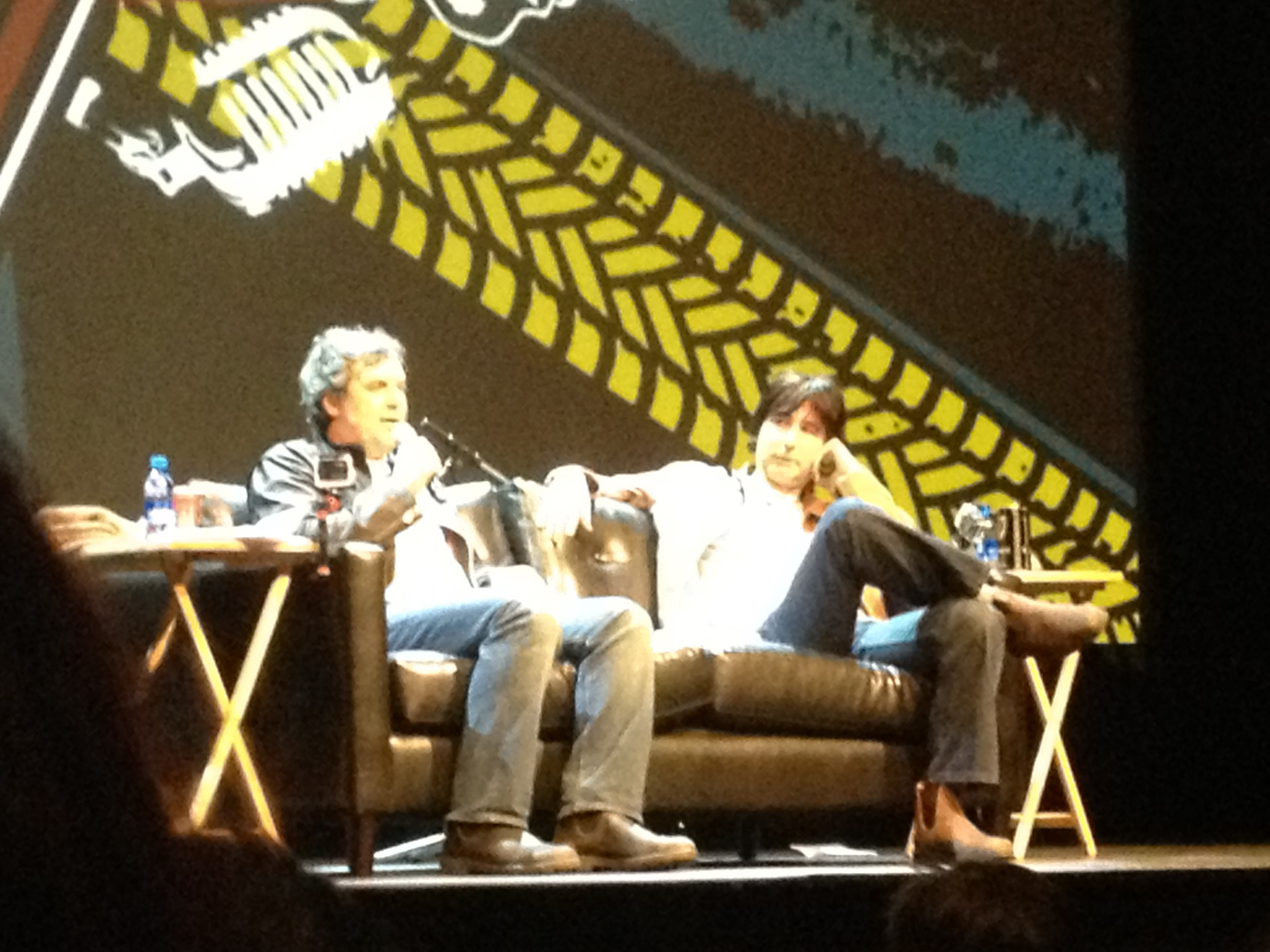
Inaugural show on March 31, 2014, at the Vogue Theatre in Vancouver.

The tour began on March 31, 2014, in Vancouver, British Columbia, and concluded on May 15 in Thunder Bay, Ontario. At these 14 shows, Hotz and Rice presented rare and unseen footage from Kenny vs. Spenny reels which broadcasters considered too graphic or outrageous to air on television. They also discussed their origins in the entertainment business and answered questions from the audience. Bobby Patton, an occasional guest on Kenny vs. Spenny, and other members of the show's crew accompanied Hotz and Rice on the tour.

== Background ==
The Showcase series Kenny vs. Spenny officially concluded on December 23, 2010. Entering the new year, stars Kenny Hotz and Spencer Rice took their careers separate ways and each announced their own shows would air in the summer of 2011. Ultimately Kenny Hotz's Triumph of the Will was not renewed for a second season, which Hotz attributes to its controversial season finale episode "Kennibal", while Single White Spenny was outright canceled by Showcase. Since each of their solo efforts, Hotz has worked more dominantly as a producer than an actor, partnering with Google to run Canada's first premium YouTube comedy channel, while Rice's X-Rayted documentary series remains unreleased. The pair have been increasingly expressing interest in a return to Kenny vs. Spenny by means of a Netflix series or feature film.

The Kenny vs. Spenny vs. Canada tour allowed Hotz and Rice to interact with fans of the series, talk about the making of their most notorious episodes and show footage that was legally or otherwise objectionably barred from airing on television. Hotz elaborated, "It always bugged me that people thought the show was fake when it's so real. If you're a fan, you'll be so relieved to finally meet us and see that it's all real and it validates the content."

== Format ==
A video introduction highlighted Hotz and Rice's origins and accomplishments in the media as they entered the stage. They began discussing Kenny vs. Spenny and showing never-before-seen footage associated with the episodes they reflect on. At several shows Hotz performed the musical number "Grandpa, Grandpa" with an acoustic guitar. Arguments frequently erupted between the pair, much like in the televised episodes. A question-and-answer segment would take place, followed by Rice being coerced into performing a "live humiliation" usually inspired by an episode from the series. Hotz would also ask for volunteers from the audience to participate in humiliations in exchange for merchandise and a post-show meet and greet. Rice's humiliation concluded the shows, which would run shy of two hours.

== Shows ==
Date	City	Province	Venue
March 31, 2014	Vancouver	British Columbia	Vogue Theatre
April 1, 2014	Edmonton	Alberta	Myer Horowitz Theatre
April 2, 2014	Calgary	Alberta	Deerfoot Inn & Casino
April 4, 2014	Regina	Saskatchewan	The Owl
April 5, 2014	Saskatoon	Saskatchewan	Louis' Pub
April 6, 2014	Winnipeg	Manitoba	Burton Cummings Theatre
May 3, 2014	Owen Sound	Ontario	Roxy Theatre
May 6, 2014	Toronto	Ontario	Queen Elizabeth Theatre
May 7, 2014	Toronto	Ontario	Queen Elizabeth Theatre
May 8, 2014	Chatham-Kent	Ontario	St. Clair College Capitol Theatre
May 11, 2014	Barrie	Ontario	Georgian Theatre
May 12, 2014	London	Ontario	Centennial Hall
May 13, 2014	Hamilton	Ontario	Molson Canadian Studio
May 15, 2014	Thunder Bay	Ontario	Thunder Bay Community Auditorium

== Film ==
Before the tour began, Kenny vs. Spenny assistant director Jamie Tiernay expressed interest in a 60-minute tour documentary entitled Kenny vs. Spenny: On the Road. Shortly before the first show Tiernay began a Kickstarter campaign, however it did not reach its goal by the April 4, 2014 deadline. In a later update, Tiernay announced he and tour organizer Trixstar had come to an agreement that would allow him to direct Kenny vs. Spenny: On the Road after all. Before the failed deadline, Tiernay expected the film to be completed by December 2014 and screening at film festivals, "trying to get as much reach as possible," before release on home video. It is unclear how the unsuccessful Kickstarter campaign will affect the film's schedule.

== Response ==
Robert Collins concluded of the opening night in Vancouver that while the show began promisingly, "For two guys who put so much effort into really pissing each other off on screen, in the flesh, they were barely trying." Collins ended his review with hope that the tour would shape up as it moved eastward across Canada.

Hotz and Rice performed to a sold-out audience at their Hamilton stop, while other shows were in high attendance. Jenny Jay said of the show that, "the greatest part about seeing the show is that viewers realize that the two people they get to know in their living rooms really are the same people in real life," and stated it was "not meant for the faint of heart".

After watching their show at Keyano College, Vincent McDermott of the Fort McMurray Today wrote that "While the show may appear cruel and mean-spirited, criticizing Hotz for his dark humour is missing the point. Deleted and bonus scenes, and his insensitive humour were highlights. But shots at Rice’s pride from Hotz and hecklers is what makes the brand a success."

Following this, shows began to sell out for the tour, some within three days of tickets going on sale.
