= The Papal Chase =

- The Papal Chase movie poster
- Directed by: Kenny Hotz
- Written by: Kenny Hotz; Paul Johnson
- Produced by: Kenny Hotz; Cheryl-Lee Fast; Sebastian Cluer
- Starring: Kenny Hotz; Sebastian Cluer; Pope John Paul II
- Cinematography: Kenny Hotz; Sebastian Cluer
- Edited by: Marco Porsia
- Music by: Brendan Michie
- Production company: Massey Films
- Distributed by: Films Transit International
- Release date: December 2, 2004 (Whistler Film Festival)
- Running time: 53 minutes
- Country: Canada
- Language: English
- Budget: $800

The Papal Chase is a 2004 Canadian micro-budget feature-length guerrilla-style mockumentary directed by Kenny Hotz of Kenny vs. Spenny fame, and written by Hotz and Paul Johnson. The film features cameo appearances by Mick Jagger, Keith Richards, and Ronnie Wood, as well as footage of Toronto mayoral candidate Kevin Clarke. It is also the only comedy feature that has an appearance by Pope John Paul II. Among its awards, the film won the Phillip Borsos Award for Best Canadian Feature Film at the 2004 Whistler Film Festival, and won 'Best Documentary' at the 2005 Canadian Filmmakers' Festival.

== Plot ==
When Pope John Paul II is visiting Canada in 2002, Kenny Hotz's friend Paul bets him $1000 that Kenny (who is Jewish) can't meet him. Over the course of six days, Kenny wears various disguises and makes multiple efforts to meet the pope in order to win the bet. Kenny's attempts include becoming a "Pope-arazzi", fighting his way through millions of pilgrims and onlookers, thousands of cops, security guards, Vatican Special Forces, and precision snipers. Along the way, Kenny crosses paths with various members of The Rolling Stones.

== Cast ==
- Kenny Hotz as himself
- Sebastian Cluer as himself
- Pope John Paul II as himself
- Mick Jagger as himself (Cameo)
- Keith Richards as himself (Cameo)
- Ronnie Wood as himself (Cameo)

== Release ==
The film debuted on December 2, 2004, at the Whistler Film Festival and had its US premiere at the Brooklyn International Film Festival in June 2005.

== Recognition ==
=== Awards and nominations ===
- 2004, won Borsos Competition Award for Best Canadian Feature Film at Whistler Film Festival
- 2005, won audience award for 'Best Documentary' at Canadian Filmmakers' Festival
- 2005, won audience award for 'Best Film' at Canadian Filmmakers' Festival for Kenny Hotz
- 2005, won audience award for 'Best Documentary' at Brooklyn International Film Festival
- 2005, won audience award for 'Documentary' at Brooklyn International Film Festival for Kenny Hotz
