= List of Kenny vs. Spenny episodes =

Kenny vs. Spenny is a Canadian reality comedy series which follows the lives of friends Kenny Hotz and Spencer Rice who face each other in various competitions. The loser of each competition must perform an act of humiliation. The humiliation is selected by the winner of each competition unless the competition ends in draw, whereby the film crew decides what act of humiliation both Hotz and Rice must perform. The series is filmed in the house that both Hotz and Rice share in Toronto.

The pilot episode premiered on Showcase in 2002. Season one officially began on August 26, 2003, with the competition Who Is the Best Fashion Designer?. Season one consisted of 26 episodes which ran until March 23, 2004.

== Series overview ==
Season	Episodes	Originally released	
Season	Episodes	First released	Last released
Pilot		2002	
1	26	August 26, 2003	March 23, 2004
2	13	October 16, 2005	January 9, 2006
3	13	October 16, 2006	January 14, 2007
4	10	November 13, 2007	January 8, 2008
5	10	October 20, 2008	December 22, 2008
6	13	November 20, 2009	February 19, 2010
Christmas Special		December 23, 2010	

== Episode list ==
=== Pilot ===
Title	Winner	Humiliation	Original release date	Prod. code
"Who Can Gain The Most Weight?"	Kenny (cheated: 16.4 lbs-8 lbs)	Spenny had to reveal the ending of the film Unbreakable to people waiting in line to buy tickets.	2002	1hh
Kenny switched Spenny's protein powder with weight loss powder causing Spenny to lose weight. Kenny also crushed up laxatives and put them in the weight loss milkshake powder.

=== Season 1 (2003–2004) ===
No.	Title	Winner	Humiliation	Original release date
1	"Who Can Lose The Most Weight?"	Kenny (cheated: 17.5 lbs-17.0 lbs)	Spenny gave a spongebath to an old man.	August 26, 2003
At the first weigh-in, Kenny hid a solder halo in his hair. Spenny's tactic was to perform continuous physical activity, while Kenny avoided all exercise. He drank laxatives to give himself diarrhea and removed body fluids, for example sweat, blood, semen and ear wax. Kenny also injected a medication which induces constipation into Spenny's food.
2	"Who Can Stay Awake the Longest?"	Kenny	Spenny had to serve as Kenny's bathroom attendant.	September 2, 2003
Kenny drank much coffee during the competition, while Spenny decided to try and win without using any artificial stimulants. Kenny used an electric wheelchair at a museum to expend as little energy as possible. Spenny wanted to follow Kenny on foot wherever he went to make sure that he wouldn't cheat. Kenny used an oxygen tank and a beeper in his ear that sounded when it was tilted to keep himself awake, while Spenny looked after a relative's children so that they could keep him awake. The duo visited a sleep clinic to see if they would fall asleep. Kenny also utilized a bright light visor which mimicked sunlight to help him stay awake. By Day 4, 81 hours, 12 minutes and 23 seconds into the competition, Kenny caught Spenny asleep on the couch.
3	"Who Is the Better Chef?"	Kenny (3–0) (Spenny cheated)	Spenny ate cat food, after much gagging.	September 9, 2003
Both guys were responsible for creating a meal for a trio of judges. In a role reversal, Kenny vowed not to cheat, knowing Spenny was not a comfortable cook. Spenny, also knowing his disadvantage, decided to cheat, after getting his mother's blessing. Several chefs refused to help Spenny cheat before he found one willing to help. Kenny, feeling confident, spent his time getting free meals at restaurants, claiming to have his own cooking show. Kenny prepared several dishes, including his mother's hummus recipe. Spenny prepared a Moroccan duck dish designed by his chef accomplice who instructed Spenny during the competition through a hidden earpiece. In the end, the judges unanimously preferred Kenny's ribs to Spenny's undercooked duck.
4	"Who Can Stand Up the Longest?"	Kenny (cheated)	Spenny bit off a piece of Kenny's toenail. Also, Kenny spat in the bottle of mouthwash he knew Spenny would use after biting Kenny's yellow nails.	September 16, 2003
Kenny used various contraptions to aid his standing; it was debated throughout the show whether this was cheating or not. There was also a lack of agreement as to whether leaning was classed as standing. In a final stand-off in which both Kenny and Spenny had to stand in one spot for as long as possible, Kenny put itching powder on Spenny's standing spot, causing Spenny to leave his position.
5	"Who Can Sit on a Cow the Longest?"	Kenny (cheated)	Spenny was covered in cow manure.	September 23, 2003
Prior to the competition, Kenny visited the farm where it would take place and picked out a docile cow for himself and a skittish cow for Spenny. On the day of the competition, Kenny threw a toy dog at Spenny's cow once the competition had started, sending the cow into a stampede, causing Spenny to fall off.
6	"Who Is the Sanest?"	Spenny (3–1)	Kenny went streaking through the streets.	September 30, 2003
Kenny tried various methods to get Spenny upset in time for the visits with the psychologists, including switching Spenny's decaf coffee with regular coffee, and random acts of violence. Kenny complained that two of the judges that voted for Spenny were themselves crazy.
7	"Who Can Earn the Most Money in Three Days?"	Spenny ($1234.31 to $67.00)	Kenny drank a coffee brewed with Spenny's underwear.	October 7, 2003
During the course of the competition Spenny tried to earn money through manual labour. He cleaned a warehouse, sold roses, and washed windshields (which is illegal in the city of Toronto, thus breaking one of his own rules) for meager sums of money. In a final attempt to improve his earnings, Spenny bet all his money at the race track and won. Meanwhile, Kenny offered various businesses a chance to advertise on the show and made thousands of dollars. However, the show's lawyer informed Kenny that he was legally obligated to split this money with Spenny, effectively cancelling out his earnings.
8	"Who Does She Like Better?"	Kenny (cheated)	Spenny received a beating from a transvestite dominatrix.	October 14, 2003
For this competition, both guys were supposed to date the same girl and let her decide who she likes better. However, Kenny arranged to have the girl date an unattractive actor who pretended to be Spenny and she chose Kenny. Meanwhile, Kenny had one of his friends date Spenny, posing as the judge, and she "chose" Kenny.
9	"Who Can Stay Blindfolded the Longest?"	Kenny (cheated)	Spenny endured Kenny's bad breath for 60 seconds.	October 21, 2003
Kenny avoided wearing the blindfold for most of the competition. He enlisted the help of a friend to torture Spenny whilst he was blindfolded, but this was actually Kenny as Spenny could not tell who it was. Kenny then planted a third blindfold for Spenny to find, which tricked Spenny into thinking Kenny had taken his off. Spenny took his own off to confront Kenny, but Kenny was wearing his blindfold.
10	"Who Can Win a Beauty Pageant?"	Spenny (2 votes)	Spenny leashed and walked Kenny like a dog.	October 28, 2003
Kenny read a Walt Whitman poem, claiming it to be his own work, and switched Spenny's tap shoes with a smaller pair. Nevertheless, the judges still chose Spenny.
11	"Who Can Win a Series of Mini-Competitions?"	Spenny (8–7)	Kenny walked up the steps of the CN Tower.	November 4, 2003
The guys competed in a series of short one-off competitions, with the winner being the guy who won more mini-comps. Kenny let Spenny win the CN Tower stair climb, knowing it would tire Spenny out for the remaining competitions; He took the elevator instead. However, Spenny still managed to win the episode after Kenny broke a rib during the wrestling competition, and thus was injured during the 100m dash.
12	"Who Can Put On A Better Fashion Show?"	Kenny	Spenny walked the streets in one of Kenny's bikini creations.	November 11, 2003
Both guys were responsible for creating several looks which would be displayed for a group of judges. Spenny used the flags of different nations to make a series of outfits for men. Kenny bought various items at the dollar store and put them together to make a series of outfits for women. Just prior to his runway show, two of Spenny's models quit, forcing him to seek help from people passing on the street. The judges unanimously picked Kenny's collection.
13	"Who Can Stay Handcuffed the Longest?"	Kenny (arguably cheated)	Spenny attempted to "pick up" women with an extremely large fake herpes sore painted on his face.	November 18, 2003
Kenny made himself as repulsive as possible to Spenny prior to the start of the competition by drinking a cocktail of smelly foods. Kenny also arranged a surprise party for Spenny (as Spenny hates being the centre of attention), pretending that it was his birthday. Kenny enlisted the help of a friend, whom Spenny hates, to annoy him and force him to quit the competition. All of Kenny's tactics did not work out. Eventually, Kenny tricked Spenny into removing the handcuffs by "agreeing" to a draw, but winking into the camera. Spenny accepted the crew's decision that Kenny had not actually agreed to the draw.
14	"Who Can Put On the Best Concert?"	Kenny (cheated: 3-0)	Spenny stood in the middle of the street, in costume, and sang Kenny's song.	November 25, 2003
Kenny's strategy was to win the hearts of the judges by hiring a children's choir. Spenny formed a rock band, held auditions for band members and wrote a song for the band to play. Kenny called Spenny's band, and informed the band that the show was cancelled using a fake message created from voice clips from the Kenny vs. Spenny editing studios. Kenny won unanimously.
15	"Who Is the Better Parent?"	Kenny (cheated)	Spenny dressed up as a baby and sat in a crib on a busy downtown sidewalk.	January 7, 2004
Spenny looked after his baby well, whereas Kenny deliberately mistreated his in an attempt to "kill" it. The night before the final judgement, Kenny switched babies so that when they were handed back in, Kenny's had been cared for and Spenny's had been neglected.
16	"Who Do Kids Like Most?"	Kenny (6–1)	Spenny bobbed for apples out of Kenny's toilet bowl.	January 14, 2004
Kenny bribed the kids by promising them a pile gifts he had, which were actually empty boxes. Feeling guilty for tricking them, he did give them gift cards in the end.
17	"Who Is the Strongest?"	Kenny (default – Spenny claimed an injury)	Spenny received an "atomic wedgie"	January 21, 2004
Agreeing that Spenny would never win against Kenny in a weight-lifting competition, Kenny suggested Spenny compete against Kenny's sister, Miriam. Kenny convinced Spenny that Miriam was stronger than he was, and that she was taking steroids; Spenny allegedly injured his arm, and refused to lift weights.
18	"Who Makes the Most Convincing Woman?"	Spenny (5–0)	Kenny "walked the streets" in an area known for prostitution whilst dressed as a woman.	January 28, 2004
The guys dressed up in drag and attempted to act as convincing women. Kenny invited Spenny's uncle over to the dinner with the judges while Spenny was wearing woman's attire in an attempt to make Spenny break character.
19	"Who Is the Better Actor?"	Kenny (cheated)	Spenny had a dozen eggs thrown at him (including one hard boiled).	February 3, 2004
Spenny wrote a monologue about a prize fighter who has lost a boxing match. This speech was influenced by Spenny's constant humiliation in the show. Kenny got a professional to do mime work in a mask, posing as him. He also gave Spenny a flat tire on his van so he couldn't watch the performance, knowing that Spenny would immediately know that it wasn't him who was acting.
20	"Who Is the Best Male Stripper?"	Spenny (5–0) (arguably cheated)	Spenny used pliers to rip out some of Kenny's body hair.	February 10, 2004
Kenny stated at the start he was going to let Spenny win out of pity and would purposely strip badly, in an attempt to cause Spenny to pull out of the competition to preserve his dignity. Spenny, realizing during Kenny's routine that it had not been a ploy, walked out on the competition, but changed his mind a few minutes later. Kenny argued that this should have resulted in forfeiture.
21	"Who Is the Best Figure Skater?"	Spenny (default – Kenny faked an injury)	No "official" humiliation – but Spenny urinated on Kenny's bed.	February 17, 2004
Kenny faked a broken leg while practising and got Spenny to tend to him for the entire episode. Spenny agreed that he would win, but would not make Kenny do a humiliation.
22	"Who Can Survive in the Woods the Longest?"	Draw (both forfeited)	Kenny and Spenny French kissed each other for five seconds (humiliation imposed by the crew).	February 23, 2004
Kenny used a smuggled magnifying glass to start a fire at night. After a verbal fight turned physical, making the crew break it up, the duo agreed to forfeit the competition.
23	"First One to Use Their Arms Loses"	Kenny (arguably cheated)	Spenny smelled Kenny's sweaty armpit for five seconds.	March 2, 2004
Kenny walked around with a dwarf friend tied to his chest and had him drop Spenny's guitar off the roof, causing Spenny to use his arms to catch it.
24	"Who Can Win a Court Case?"	Kenny	Kenny spat in Spenny's face.	March 9, 2004
Kenny took Spenny to court to claim he was owed money. Kenny made Spenny paranoid by placing a fake 'bug' on Spenny's phone, making him think that Kenny had been listening to his calls. Spenny admitted to having phone sex, which involved role-play. Kenny called Spenny's camera crew as witnesses that Spenny admitted owing him money.
25	"Who Can Live in a Van the Longest?"	Tie	No humiliation.	March 16, 2004
The guys split the van front/rear, with the first to leave the van losing. Kenny equipped the back of the van with a television, stove and other equipment, while Spenny drove and stayed in the front seat. After several days, growing tired, Spenny agreed to switch places, secretly taking the keys with him. However, Kenny had made a duplicate key, planning to drive dangerously to make Spenny leave the van. Kenny's plan backfired as his electric equipment had drained the battery and the van could not be started or boosted.
26	"Who Is the Better Boxer?"	Spenny (Kenny forfeited)	Kenny urinated in his pants	March 23, 2004
Kenny refused to fight Spenny because he did not want to hurt his friend or make him bleed. Kenny created a 'prison cell' in his closet to lock Spenny in, so that he would not show up for the fight. Kenny left Spenny in the closet for a day whilst he left to go sightseeing at Niagara Falls. Kenny got worried about Spenny's wellbeing and returned home to let Spenny out. When Kenny unlocked the door, Spenny threw his collected feces at Kenny. At the time of the fight, Kenny did not show up as he was taking apart his makeshift cell.

a: In the mini-comps competition, Spenny (9 wins – 8 shown in each of the TV and DVD versions) urinated longer (Kenny disqualified); jumped on a pogo stick more times (5–2); won rock, paper, scissors; stared longer (only shown on Season 1 DVD); held his breath longer; bowled a better game (146–105); scored higher on the pinball machine (only shown on television); climbed the CN Tower stairs faster (Kenny did not climb) and won the 100-metre dash. Kenny (8 wins – 7 shown in each of the TV and DVD versions) stood on his head longer; blew a bigger gum bubble; won the spelling bee; stuffed more marshmallows in his mouth (15–10); had a higher sperm count (caused Spenny not to give a sample); climbed a flight of stairs faster; spat a grape a further distance (arguably cheated, only shown on television) and won the wrestling match (12–4).
b: Although these episodes were filmed as part of season one, they actually appear on the season two DVDs.

=== Season 2 (2005–2006) ===
No.	Title	Winner	Humiliation	Original release date
1	"Who Can Drink More Beer?"	Kenny (cheated)	Spenny ate Kenny's vomit (believing it was his own).	October 16, 2005
Kenny drank non-alcoholic beer and consumed a 'magic powder' to convince Spenny that it was allowing him to drink more and was not making him drunk. Once Spenny had passed out from excessive drinking, Kenny made himself vomit to make Spenny think he threw up. (Rules of the contest stated that if either vomited, they would be disqualified.)
2	"Who Can Stay Naked the Longest?"	Kenny (arguably cheated)	Spenny stood on a busy street corner dressed as a town crier and proclaimed to have a small penis.	October 23, 2005
Spenny bought Kenny a first class ticket to Las Vegas, but Kenny changed the reservation date using Spenny's credit card. Kenny went out under an umbrella with a curtain hanging from it. After Spenny refused to take off his wrist watch, Kenny got a giant watch to wear around his waist until Spenny agreed to take his watch off. After Kenny hired three leathermen to come over and abuse Spenny, Spenny decided to hide in the basement for the rest of the competition. While he was down there, Kenny set all the clocks in the house ahead five minutes so Spenny would think the competition was over and put on clothes early.
3	"Who Has the Biggest Balls?"	Spenny (arguably cheated)	Kenny licked bird feces off of the windshield of the production van.	October 31, 2005
The two took part in several comps to determine who was braver. To make Spenny scared of him, Kenny ran into Spenny's room and trashed his belongings. Kenny forfeited to stop Spenny from jumping off a cliff into water to prove that he has the biggest balls. As Kenny and Spenny walked back to the van, the production crew expressed a belief that Spenny would not have really jumped, as "he [didn't] have the balls."
4	"Who do Old People Like More?"	Kenny (3–0) (cheated)	Spenny participated in a seniors' water aerobics class while wearing a woman's bathing suit.	November 7, 2005
Three old ladies spent time with each guy as judges. Spenny took them to a financial seminar and fitness class. Kenny treated them to manicures, and brought them to meet his family, including a man with Down syndrome who pretended to be Kenny's brother, "Lenny". Kenny also made up a story that Spenny tried to "touch" Lenny when they were younger, but "Lenny" failed to relay this information.
5	"Who Can Dance the Longest?"	Kenny (arguably cheated)	Spenny dressed up as a cheerleader and performed several self-denigrating cheers.	November 14, 2005
After stalling for a long time, Kenny said the competition would start after he changed his shoes. Kenny then started dancing in front of Spenny, making him think that the competition had started. Kenny then snuck out of the house. Spenny hired a detective to look for Kenny. After several hours, Kenny returned to the house and was not dancing. Spenny thinking he'd won rested on the couch, visibly in pain from dancing without rest. Kenny showed Spenny the tape from a camera earlier, which showed that the competition would start once Kenny had changed his shoes. Not willing to accept defeat, Spenny agreed to officially start the dancing competition. However, since Spenny was already physically exhausted, Kenny easily won.
6	"First One to Talk Loses"	Spenny	Kenny had his mouth washed out with soap.	November 21, 2005
Spenny used a marker board to communicate and used a parabolic microphone to eavesdrop on Kenny while he slept, as he knew that Kenny talks during his sleep, but could not record any audio of him talking. Kenny used a text-to-speech program to talk for him. Kenny invited Spenny's cousin over on a date to get Spenny to speak in anger, but instead spoke himself while trying to make out with her.
7	"Who Is Funnier?"	Kenny	Spenny performed oral sex on a condom-covered cucumber.	November 28, 2005
Kenny mailed Spenny a fake letter from the Ministry of Health, informing him that he may have HIV to demoralize him. Kenny then used the practical joke as his entry for the competition. Spenny attempted to perform stand-up comedy, but was too upset to do his routine. Mark Breslin was the sole judge of the competition. Once Spenny found out that his HIV scare was part of Kenny's plan, Spenny destroyed Kenny's clothing, and slashed his leather jacket.
8	"Who Can Kiss More Women?"	Kenny (420–33)	Spenny kissed the buttocks and testicles of a horse statue.	December 5, 2005
Kenny dressed up as a French tourist, thinking that French people kiss more. A girl Spenny met during the competition attempted to help him get more kisses, and the two seemed to be starting a relationship. Kenny also pretended to be gay as girls are more willing to kiss gay guys, and also had a cute puppy with him to make women think he was caring. Spenny then began to suspect she might be working for Kenny, and as a result Spenny got rid of her. Kenny later revealed that he did not have anything to do with the girl.
9	"Who Can Sell More Bibles?"	Kenny (7–0) (arguably cheated)	Spenny flew to Los Angeles and waited at the airport in vain for non-existent Hollywood executives to pick him up.	December 12, 2005
Kenny tricked Spenny into thinking his children's film script was bought by Hollywood executives. Spenny, thinking that his script offer was real, bought seven Bibles from Kenny to prove he was serious about quitting the show to become a Hollywood screenwriter.
10	"Who Can Win a Rat Race?"	Spenny (cheated)	Kenny had a live rat placed in his underwear.	December 19, 2005
Kenny kidnapped Sally the rat (Spenny's rat). Spenny retaliated by stealing his valuable vinyl records, which angered Kenny into "kidnapping" Spenny's mother, who he exchanged for his records. Kenny then used a large capybara, claiming it was a "South American Jungle Rat". However, during the race, the carybara stopped half-way down the track and didn't run further. While Kenny was trying to encourage the animal to run, Spenny's rat ran off the track. Spencer picked it up and put it back at the start of the track (apparently violating the rule against directing the rats during the race) and it ran swiftly to the finish line.
11	"First One to be Mean Loses"	Draw (Spenny cheated)	No humiliation (draw); however, Kenny dressed Spenny up as a clown and urinated on him while he was unconscious.	December 26, 2005
Although a poorly thought out rule set, the first rule defined mean as, among other things, malicious. Kenny intentionally mispronounces this, to which Spenny ridicules him. Kenny points out that it is mean, but Spenny denies this, claiming it is ironically malicious. However, since they have just defined mean as malicious, Spenny lost the competition, although no one caught on to that. Kenny disguised apparently mean acts as "nice", such as giving Spenny the gift of a parrot to annoy him. The two assigned a referee after agreeing they would never concur on whether an act was mean. After Kenny pretended to have slept with one of Spenny's previous girlfriends when they were dating, Spenny then consumed several tranquilizers in a final effort to prevent himself from being mean. Spenny eventually passed out until the end of the competition.
12	"Who Is the Better Journalist?"	Spenny (default – Kenny did not show)	Kenny sat on a toilet placed on the sidewalk of a busy street.	January 1, 2006
Kenny tried to create fake news stories by hiring actors that look like famous people, including fake Beyoncé, however he failed to appear at the judging because he was apparently having sex with her in his bedroom.
13	"Who Is the Better Rapper?"	Spenny (2–1) (Kenny arguably cheated)	Spenny had "Kenny is a Loser" displayed on a large outdoor TV screen along with some very unflattering pictures. Spenny became annoyed after realizing that narcissistic Kenny actually enjoyed the attention.	January 8, 2006
Kenny created a fake crime scene at their home to look like a drive by shooting caused by Spenny's remarks made to a gang. Kenny had hired an actor to play a police officer but Spenny saw through the act by noting the officer's dirty shoes. He subsequently went along with the whole ordeal (relocating to a hotel room), making Kenny believe that he would not show up to the rap-off. Spenny does show up however, and wins with help from the Rice Cakes.

=== Season 3 (2006–2007) ===
No.	Title	Winner	Humiliation	Original release date
1	"First One to Laugh Loses"	Spenny	Kenny ate one of Spenny's freshly picked "boogers".	October 16, 2006
Both players agreed to give their attention to each other's attempts at making one another laugh. Spenny had a mutual friend humiliate himself in front of Kenny. Results of competition were decided by reviewing the video in slow motion, as Kenny and Spenny both laughed at nearly the same moment.
2	"Who Do Gay Guys Like More?"	Draw (both lost)	Kenny and Spenny were each "teabagged" on the forehead (humiliation imposed by the film crew).	October 23, 2006
Spenny's date consisted of him truthfully relating his opinions and experiences with homosexuality to the gay judge. Kenny pretended to be gay and claimed that Spenny was in the closet. Ultimately, the lone gay judge chose "neither" after walking out on his date with Kenny when Kenny took his act too far.
3	"Who Can Wear A Dead Octopus On Their Head The Longest?"	Kenny (cheated)	Spenny ate sushi off of Kenny's naked buttocks (DVD alternate humiliation: Spenny inserted his condom-covered tongue into the rectum of the cat Kenny tried to use to remove Spenny's octopus earlier in the episode).	October 30, 2006
Kenny took the octopus off his head and attached the tentacles to his hat to make it look like he was still wearing it. Also, Kenny dosed Spenny with LSD, leading to Spenny releasing the octopus into the lake.
4	"Who Can Win a Ten Mile Race?"	Spenny	Kenny received a spanking on his bare buttocks from his mother.	November 6, 2006
Kenny tricked Spenny into believing that Kenny's mother was dead, so that Spenny would go to a fake funeral miles away from the race track. Spenny managed to drive back to the track and still beat Kenny.
5	"Who Can Make a Better Porno?"	Kenny	Spenny performed anal sex on one of Kenny's inflatable male sex dolls.	November 13, 2006
Kenny makes a series of funny pornographic scenes, defeating Spenny’s routine porn.
6	"Who Can Lift More Weight With Their Genitals?"	Kenny (Spenny forfeited)	Spenny sucked on the nipples of mutual friend Bobby.	November 20, 2006
Kenny lifted 5 fake bricks with his genitals which Spenny believed were real. Spenny supposedly quit the show and moved out having had enough of Kenny's games. Kenny held tryouts for Spenny's position. In the end Spenny realizing he would be sued, agreed to stay on the show but ultimately lost the competition.
7	"Who Is Cooler?"	Kenny	Spenny stood naked in a meat freezer.	November 27, 2006
Kenny faked a drug overdose causing Spenny to lose his cool during judgement, although Spenny's attempts at being cool would have lost him the competition anyway. Competition judged by Gavin McInnes.
8	"Who Can Produce More Semen?"	Kenny (both individuals cheated)	Kenny tried to get Spenny to drink the semen he collected, but Spenny refused. Kenny then splashed Spenny with the semen.	December 4, 2006
Kenny got semen from other crew members and collected semen from used condoms in alleyways. In addition, Kenny stole an x-ray machine and irradiated Spenny. Just before the final verdict, Spenny filled his beaker with hair conditioner, which fooled Kenny; however, he couldn't go through with cheating and quickly admitted what he had done.
9	"Who Can Stay in a Haunted House the Longest?"	Spenny	Kenny dressed in and modeled women's lingerie in a store window.	December 11, 2006
Before entering the house, Spenny went to specialists on the supernatural in hopes of resolving his fears while Kenny went to a different specialist on the supernatural in hopes of gaining the skills to conjure up the devil. While in the house, Kenny played many tricks on Spenny in hopes of scaring him out of the house. In a last-ditch effort to prevent his fears from taking over, Spenny handcuffed himself to a chain link in a room. Kenny went to the room next door and attempted to raise the devil in a ritualistic fashion. What followed was a loud bang which caused Kenny and the crew to run out of the house. The loud bang turned out to be a crane from the next building.
10	"Who Can Catch a Bigger Fish?"	Kenny (cheated)	Spenny's head was wrapped in clingfilm while he pressed his face into a hanging pig's buttocks.	December 18, 2006
Prior to the competition, Kenny visited the owner of the boat and paid him off to go to an area with no fish, and to go through with his plan. Also during his trip, Kenny had filmed himself catching a dead fish. Later on during the actual competition, Kenny pushed Spenny into the lake, drove away, and left him for 30 minutes. Afterwards, the boat drove back and retrieved Spenny and Kenny showed him the tape made beforehand of him catching the fish.
11	"Who Can Imitate the Other Guy Better?"	Kenny	Kenny, through an earpiece, made Spenny say rude things to unsuspecting people on the street.	December 25, 2006
Kenny besmirched Spenny's character while imitating him thus provoking Spenny to break out of character too many times.
12	"Who Can Stay Homeless the Longest?"	Kenny (arguably cheated)	Kenny kneed Spenny in the groin.	January 7, 2007
During the contest Kenny visited his bank and withdrew money without his card so he could dine in a restaurant. Spenny was arrested after hitting Kenny in front of two police officers, causing him to spend the night in a cell, thus losing the competition. (Rules stated that they must sleep outside).
13	"Arm Wrestling Competition"	Kenny	When the real Spenny lost he had to stick his hand in a public bathroom toilet and unplug it. The toilet was nearly overflowing with urine, feces and other garbage.	January 14, 2007
Spenny secluded himself to train, and hired a security team to prevent Kenny from sabotaging him before the competition, leaving only a recording for Kenny when he arrived to shoot the couch introduction. Kenny contacted 20 people across Canada named Spencer Rice, and located a 14-year-old in Sault Ste. Marie willing to arm-wrestle him, arguing that contractually, he merely had to arm-wrestle someone by that name. The replacement Spencer Rice lost and was humiliated by putting ice cubes down his pants, being hosed down, having baby food poured on his head and a pie smashed in his face. After objecting to Kenny's "trick", Kenny agreed to arm-wrestle Spenny, easily defeating him even though Spenny had trained for the entire episode. Professional wrestlers Angelina Love & Traci Brooks make an appearance.

=== Season 4 (2007–2008) ===
No.	Title	Winner	Humiliation	Original release date
1	"First Guy to Get a Boner Loses."	Kenny (arguably cheated)	Spenny was forced to get his genitals covered with bees.	November 13, 2007
Kenny got a nerve blocking injection into his penis, preventing him from getting an erection. After some time without erections, the two agreed to get simultaneous lap dances, each choosing a stripper for the other. Kenny remained unable to get an erection, but chose a male stripper for Spenny. Spenny ultimately got an erection from the dancer's grinding, claiming he got it from watching Kenny's female stripper.
2	"Who Can Blow the Biggest Fart?"	Kenny (Spenny arguably cheated)	Spenny was forced to lie down while James McAndrew, the "National Farting Champion of Canada" repeatedly farted in his face.	November 13, 2007
Both Kenny and Spenny ate foods that were very "gassy." After Spenny blew an impressive fart, Kenny became worried and later on laced his own chili with flatulence-reducing powder, in the hope that Spenny would eat it. Kenny manually pumped air into his colon, producing louder and longer farts to psych out Spenny; however, these farts were not measured, as they expelled air, not flatus. Spenny fell for this trap, after witnessing Kenny produce large farts, and was unable to fart for the last few hours of the competition. Kenny's biggest measured fart was a 26.8, while Spenny blew a 24.2, however the impressive fart that Spenny blew measured a 3.2 because he had the meter facing the wrong way.
3	"Who Can Make the Best Viral Video?"	Kenny (10,348–8,175 hits)	Spenny was forced to lick the doorhandle of an adult video store.	November 20, 2007
Each roommate shot several video options. Kenny chose "Kenny on Paris Hilton" for the title, showing him dancing via greenscreen on a Hilton hotel balcony in Paris. Spenny chose "Spenny drinks pee", after his crew insisted on it.
4	"Who Can Eat More Meat?"	Spenny (15.0–14.6 lbs)	Kenny was forced to make out with an old lady.	November 27, 2007
Spenny's tactic was to eat turkey, while Kenny tried to gross out Spenny by eating cow tongue and other unappetising meats. Kenny was forced to stop eating when he got food poisoning. Spenny worked out while eating and edged out Kenny, who could not eat due to his sickness.
5	"First Guy to Get a Stain Loses."	Kenny	Spenny was rolled down a hill in a plastic sphere with dog feces inside.	December 4, 2007
After repeatedly having to clarify the rules and start over, the contest was changed to "Whoever Has the Most Stains Loses". Kenny and Spenny competed in four high-risk stain competitions, in which Kenny handily defeated Spenny.
6	"Who Can Be Tied to a Goat the Longest?"	Kenny	Spenny had to wear a goat costume and was humped by his own goat.	December 11, 2007
Kenny used a very long rope, and used various methods to upset Spenny's goat. Kenny tricked Spenny by letting Spenny think Kenny killed his own goat by buying a skinned lamb at the butcher and he tied it to his other foot pretending he had killed his goat, making Spenny quit in disgust.
7	"Who Can Handle More Torture?"	Spenny (5–2)	Kenny had to do improvisation, which he hates.	December 18, 2007
In a series of torture mini-comps, Kenny avoided doing any torture either by cheating or forfeiting, allowing Spenny to humiliate himself many times, while accepting only the one humiliation for losing the competition.
8	"First Guy to Stop Singing Loses."	Kenny (cheated)	Kenny acted as an organ grinder on the street while Spenny, wearing a diaper, fez, and coat, acted like a monkey to collect money.	December 25, 2007
Spenny used his singing to try to raise money for a community centre. Kenny tried to use costumes to keep his singing interesting and rested his voice by lip syncing with a choir. He then sprayed Windex in Spenny's mouth to make him stop singing.
9	"Who Can Be Obese the Longest?"	Kenny (cheated)	Spenny lay beneath Kenny and acted as a human bidet by spitting water.	January 4, 2008
The guys wore weight vests to see who could carry an extra 80 lbs. the longest. Kenny ordered a high-tech, padded weight vest on the show's budget while Spenny used a regular vest with barbells and other weights tied to it. Kenny took the weights out of his vest after the initial weighing. He then donned makeup and a fat suit and left the house. Upon returning, Spenny noticed that Kenny had a whole right index finger (Kenny lost the tip of it in a bicycle accident when he was younger) and deduced that this was a decoy. Spenny heard noises from Kenny's room upstairs and used a lipstick camera and saw Kenny still in his room without his weights on, so he took his own weights off knowing that Kenny had lost. Spenny ultimately discovered that the decoy downstairs was Kenny all along and was wearing a fake finger. The man in Kenny's room was actually a make-up artist wearing a mould of Kenny's face.
10	"Who Can Commit the Most Crimes?"	Spenny 15–82 (Kenny disqualified)	Kenny was held in stocks in public while Spenny and others threw tomatoes at his face.	January 8, 2008
Kenny performed many minor, petty crimes, for example loitering, spitting and driving without a seatbelt. Spenny preferred to stick to more politically correct, "good" crimes, until he became drunk while drinking in public. Although Kenny had a large lead, he received a parking ticket from a police officer, and was disqualified for being "busted". (The rules of the competition stated that if they were caught committing a crime, they would be disqualified).

=== Season 5 (2008) ===
No.	Title	Winner	Humiliation	Original release date
1	"Who Can Keep a Dump in their Pants the Longest?"	Kenny (both individuals cheated)	Spenny cleaned the windows of their production company building, wearing nothing but a safety harness.	October 20, 2008
Both Kenny and Spenny wore a diaper in which they defecated. Kenny used various methods to dry out his feces, though it accidentally dropped out of his diaper, and he replaced it without telling Spenny. He then tricked Spenny into purchasing laxatives, giving Spenny diarrhea. A small bit of diarrhea dripped out of Spenny's diaper, but he cleaned it. Spenny then taped waterproof pants over his diaper to keep the feces in. In order to settle the competition, they engaged in a series of activities that involved "slamming" their behinds. Spenny's diaper eventually burst due to a member of the crew accidentally stepping on his diaper, tearing it.
2	"Who Can Bone More Women?"	Kenny (cheated)	Spenny was going to have Kenny masturbate on camera. There was no humiliation for Spenny (other than Kenny's revelation).	October 27, 2008
Eight women came to the house and the guys tried to get physically intimate with them as much as possible. Points were awarded based on the "baseball" sexual metaphor: one, two, and three points were awarded for getting to first, second, or third base respectively. Ten points were awarded for hitting a home run. Spenny decided to stick with one girl who said she wanted to help him win. He repeatedly went to third base with her while Kenny had relatively little luck with the other ladies. It seemed Spenny had won the competition 22-7. However, at Kenny's humiliation, Kenny revealed that the girl Spenny had stuck with was also a trans woman Kenny had hired. Since she was not a biological female, none of Spenny's points with her counted.
3	"Who Can Wear a Gorilla Suit the Longest?"	Kenny (cheated)	Kenny tied Spenny (wearing the gorilla suit) to the hood of a Jeep and drove him around Toronto.	November 3, 2008
Kenny acted like a gorilla for much of the episode, acting violent towards Spencer. Spenny planned to trap Kenny in a sauna, but Kenny trapped Spenny instead while he was preparing. Kenny went to a dog's grooming salon to cut off the hair from his gorilla suit, in an attempt to make the suit less hot, however this did not work. Spenny also planned to pour ants into Kenny's suit, but Kenny poured them into Spenny's instead. Kenny finally lit Spenny's mask on fire, forcing him to take it off.
4	"Who Can Piss Off More People?"	Kenny	Spenny ate a cracker with a friend's pubic hair shaved onto it.	November 10, 2008
Spenny wore a disguise to try to remain anonymous and enlisted the help of an "asshole" friend for advice. He insulted people, tried to overcharge them for ice cream, startle them, and gave out tickets dressed as a police officer. Kenny began with similar activities, stealing people's frisbees and balls, but moved on to bigger stunts. He pretended his van had broken down in the middle of a busy downtown Toronto intersection, and left it there; he acted as a fan of the visiting team at a Toronto Blue Jays game, and pretended to beat up the team mascot; and finally, he hired a plane to tow a banner reading "Jesus Sucks!" over the city, being deemed to have effectively pissed off "the whole city".
5	"First Guy to Touch the Ground Loses"	Spenny	Kenny played with his penis in front of his mother.	November 17, 2008
Both Kenny and Spenny wore various apparatuses on their feet to avoid touching the ground. The crew could not help the guys. Kenny got a bodybuilder to carry him up the stairs while Spenny was having trouble with his makeshift flowerpot shoes. Kenny used a wheelchair and a Segway to get around. Spenny planned to go out on a friend's boat after Kenny had fallen asleep. Spenny declared that touching the floor on a boat in the water would not count as being on the ground. Spenny waited in a harness chair, but while he was waiting, Kenny knocked away his flowerpot shoes and anything else Spenny could use to walk on by using a basketball (the rules stated that neither person could touch the other guy's stuff), leaving him stranded in the harness. Kenny tormented Spenny in the style of a James Bond villain, shooting him with pellets, tennis balls and pennies, throwing live crabs at him, and placing an electric eel in a pool under the harness. While taunting Spenny, however, Kenny lost control of his Segway and fell off.
6	"Who's the Best Pro Wrestler?"	Kenny	Spenny was put naked into the ring and The Iron Sheik attacked him with a fake hammer and attempted to sodomize him with a beer bottle.	November 24, 2008
Each guy had to create a professional wrestling persona and fight a match against an actual wrestler. Spenny paired up with Tyson Dux, and Kenny paired up with Celine Jian. Spenny, a wrestling fan, worked hard on a choreographed fight with Dux, creating the persona "The Nice Guy", and had an inspirational talk with The Iron Sheik. Kenny tried to avoid learning any difficult moves, aiming to win via the entertainment aspect of wrestling, and created a monster character called "Yarp Yarp". During Spenny's match, Kenny and Jian arrived unannounced and joined Dux in attacking Spenny. Spenny was confused and demanded they stop. Afterwards, the judge decided that, while Kenny's persona was stupid, Spenny's breaking character was a "cardinal sin" of wrestling, and declared him the loser.
7	"Who's the Best Soldier?"	Kenny	Spenny laid in a kiddie pool and the crew all vomited on him.	December 1, 2008
A Canadian Forces drill instructor put the guys through basic training in order to judge who was the best soldier. Kenny intentionally slacked off and acted like a poor soldier so that he could appear to be improving as the competition progressed. Spenny, on the other hand, started out strong but became rattled by Kenny when the corporal charged him with getting Kenny to act properly. The guys were put through an obstacle course where Kenny faked an injury, and target practice at a shooting range where Kenny excelled and Spenny was ejected for unsafe gun practices. The corporal decided that Spenny was too easily rattled and declared Kenny the winner.
8	"Who's the Better Jew?"	Spenny	Kenny ate a pig's snout while drinking milk, in conflict with Kashrut.	December 8, 2008
Kenny bragged about and showed off his strong Jewish upbringing and knowledge of Hebrew. Spenny admitted being a bad Jew in the past and enlisted the help of a rabbi to aid him in discovering his Jewish history, but was consistently confused by the practices and theories behind Judaism. Spenny's rabbi helps him become Bar Mitzvah but is called out to attend a funeral, leaving Spenny alone. Kenny staged a "Jew-bilee" telethon and gave $1,800 of alleged donations to the synagogue of the rabbi acting as judge of the competition. In the final judgment, Spenny admitted his past failures as a Jew and explained his journey for the previous few days, and declared himself a "failure as a Jew" at that time. Kenny told the rabbi his personal and family history. The rabbi used a parable to explain that while Kenny knew more, Spenny was a better Jew because he was headed in the right direction.
9	"Who Do Disabled People Like More?"	Kenny (cheated)	A police attack dog attacked Spenny's crotch while he wore a protective suit.	December 15, 2008
Three disabled judges spent a day with each of the guys; one with TAR syndrome, one hearing impaired, and one with a visual impairment (retinitis pigmentosa). Spenny attempted to take them to voice any concerns they might have to the mayor of Toronto, but he was not in his office when they arrived. He instead took them swimming and threw a party. Kenny misled the judges into thinking that Spenny's name was "Kenny"; and then made efforts to be unlikeable, hoping to get the judges would use the name "Kenny" while intending vote for Spenny. Kenny took the judges to an art gallery, had them play instruments and sing in a band, raced a go kart while they watched, and finished the day with a game of dodgeball. Two judges mistakenly voted for "Kenny", intending to vote for Spenny; the third judge, secretly a fan of the show, was aware of and impressed by Kenny's strategy, and voted for the real Kenny.
10	"Who Can Smoke More Weed?"	Draw (both lost)	The crew made Kenny and Spenny take a nude bath together.	December 22, 2008
Kenny and Spenny purchased a large amount of marijuana and continually smoked it in various "toke rooms" around the house. At one point, their smoke alarm went off, and a fire truck came by, spooking Spenny into thinking that it was the police. The crew created the "crazy wheel" where the boys had to do whatever task it landed on, such as toking, impersonating a character or solving a math equation. By the end, they were both so intoxicated that they lost track of the amount of marijuana they had smoked, resulting in a draw.

=== Season 6 (2009–2010) ===
No.	Title	Winner	Humiliation	Original release date
Web	"Who's The Bigger Idiot?"	Spenny	Spenny brushed his toilet bowl with a toilet brush, and Kenny was forced to brush his teeth with it.	November 27, 2009
The boys did a competition to see who the bigger idiot is, with the crew judging the competition. Kenny's tactics included dressing up as the dictionary definition of an idiot, taking stock footage from sexual education videos and incorporating himself in them and destroying the house. Spenny recreated scenes from his idiotic past but after reading the definition of "idiot" he joined Kenny in destroying the house. The crew admits Kenny tried, but Spenny is unanimously the bigger idiot.
1	"Who Can 69 The Longest?"	Kenny	Kenny spread dogfood on Spenny's buttocks and had dogs eat it off.	November 20, 2009
The boys were strapped to each other in the 69 position resulting in almost zero mobility between them. The crew eventually got bored and physically abused Kenny and Spenny in various ways. Spenny eventually quit after both he and Kenny were sprayed with a fire hose.
2	"Who Can Squeeze More Boobs?"	Kenny	Spenny unknowingly ate popcorn that Kenny made from unpopped kernels he had swallowed and recovered from his feces.	November 20, 2009
The boys set up a scoring system for seeing/touching breasts, with the winner being the one who scored the most points. Spenny attempted to simply ask people to touch their breasts. His plan failing, he moved on to attempt a sidewalk breast-exam booth, and a Girls Gone Wild-style operation downtown. Spenny believed he was thinking outside the box by including men's breasts (the rules only specify "breasts"); However, Kenny noticed the loophole as well, and included cow's udders, mannequins, and even chicken breasts. He also noted that "touching" was not defined as being limited to hands. He hugged fans at an autograph session, and brushed up against women at the CNE.
3	"Who Can Keep His Head In A Chicken Coop The Longest?"	Kenny	Spenny has to put a skunk in his cage, and it sprayed him in the face.	November 27, 2009
The boys put chicken coops on their heads with live chickens in them. At the start, Kenny put a baby chick in his cage and removed the adult chicken. Eventually he suggested that the competition should be changed to "Who Can Debate With A Chicken Coop On Their Head?" and Spenny agreed. They got a judge and in the middle of Spenny's debate, Kenny lowered a hook from the rafters and pulled Spenny's cage off.
4	"Who Can Get Further With The Other Guy's Mom?"	Kenny	Kenny makes Spenny put his own mother's underwear in his mouth.	December 4, 2009
The boys see who can get further sexually with the other guy's mom. Spenny goes to Kenny's mom's house and says it's a "good samaritan" competition, while Kenny is making degrading skits depicting "Spenny's mom". Spenny gets denied numerous times, he tries to make out with her and she says no and walks away, and eventually he takes a shower and removes his robe in front of her. Kenny's mom kicks Spenny out when he tries to convince her to do things like touch his penis so he can win the competition. Kenny goes to Spenny's mom's house and brings her white wine (her favorite beverage) and takes her to bed and according to Kenny he "could not legally say what happened" but he smells his finger and makes a disgusted face which could suggest he may have touched her genitals.
5	"Who Can Win a Cockfight?"	Kenny	Kenny makes Spenny take a toke off of a joint consisting of the crew's body hair.	December 11, 2009
The guys have an ultimate fighting-style match, but all attacks must "emanate" from the penis. It is eventually interpreted to mean that weapons can be attached to the penis. Spenny attaches steak knives to his, while Kenny creates a device to wear that includes a flamethrower, Roman candles, mace, and a smoke screen. After being maced in the ring, Spenny quits.
6	"Who's A Better Basketball Coach?"	Kenny	Kenny pretends to defecate on Spenny's face with a diarrhea-looking paste.	December 18, 2009
In the first competition chosen by a fan, the boys each select and coach a basketball team. Spenny finds the best team he can, while Kenny hires a wheelchair basketball team. Spenny observes Kenny's team practicing and decides not to pit his team against handicapped athletes. At the last minute, Spenny gets together a team of children, hoping the wheelchair players won't play against children; however, Kenny is aware of Spenny's plan and at the competition, brings in a team of non-handicapped adults, who easily defeat Spenny's team of children.
7–8	"Who Do Black Guys Like More? Pt. 1 and Pt. 2"	Kenny (cheated)(3/3)	Kenny scraped a large amount of food debris from his tongue which Spenny had to keep on his tongue for 10 seconds.	January 8, 2010, January 15, 2010
Spenny took the three black judges on a "Race Relations Retreat", where he discussed racism and his own racist inclinations. The judges believed that Spenny was being honest and were proud of his efforts to explore his attitudes towards other black people. While Spenny was gone, Kenny hired a black maid to clean the house and be interviewed. In part two, Spenny wrapped up his retreat by dressing in Ku Klux Klan outfit to make a point about the ignorance of racists. Kenny then took the judges to a comedy club so all four could tell the racist jokes they grew up hearing, and laugh at the stereotypes. He then took them back to the house and told them he had some hidden camera footage to show them. Kenny played a video he edited, intercutting shots of the black maid cleaning, and Spenny being demeaning and insulting (from earlier in the first episode, where he was speaking to Kenny who, in blackface, acted as a maid to taunt Spenny). The judges all voted for Kenny, with one even claiming that they would have voted for him even without the video, preferring to just hang out in a normal situation, as Kenny did.
9	"Who Can Have More Fun?"	Kenny	Spenny (who is afraid of heights) rides in a small airplane while aerobatic maneuvers are performed.	January 22, 2010
The boys see who can have more fun this week, and Kenny starts off by tormenting Spenny when Spenny is trying to do his fun (tactics like putting beef in his bed and making love to the bed where the meat is stuffed and also breaking Spenny's stuff). Spenny gives Kenny $1,000 to go to "Amsterdam" and Kenny takes the offer, but goes to the "Amsterdam" beer company, and showers himself in beer, meanwhile, Spenny is trying to have a dinner party but Kenny comes back and crashes it. Spenny eventually goes on a boat ride with three prostitutes and booze but gets too drunk and passes out before he could have more fun with the prostitutes. Meanwhile Kenny is crushing cars (and Spenny's laptop), and in the end Spenny admits Kenny had more fun.
10	"Who Can ...?"	Kenny (not technically a competition)	Spenny, in shackles, was forced to kneel before Kenny.	January 29, 2010
Spenny arrived at the house on a non-shooting day to find Kenny having spent much of the production budget on props, costumes and actors to decorate the house and act as emperor Magnus Maximus. The intended competition for the week involved a badminton competition, but Spenny could not understand what Kenny was doing. Thinking that Kenny had declared his own competition, Spenny declared several of his own, including "Who is the better emperor?", acting as Theodosius I, who had killed Maximus historically. However, when he confronted Kenny, Kenny's guards dragged Spenny to the basement and chained him up. After staying in the basement for a period of time, Spenny gave up and knelt before Kenny. Kenny revealed that it was his intent to humiliate Spenny without the need of a competition. He threw Spenny the keys to unlock his chains before fleeing the house.
11	"Who Can Produce The Best Commercial?"	Spenny (arguably cheated)	Kenny stars in a short music video in the Spozo clown costume praising Spenny.	February 5, 2010
The guys are tasked with creating and branding a frozen pizza, along with creating an advertising campaign. Kenny branded his pizza Formaggio Al Forno ("cheese from the oven") to emulate a gourmet product. He created a number of unconventional commercials in a variety of genres, mostly being comedic or non-sequitur. Spenny created a healthy tofu-based whole-wheat pizza aimed at children which featured balloons and coloured and shaped tofu-pepperoni pieces. His commercial featured Spozo the clown bringing his pizza to a family at dinner. A focus group of children gave negative reviews of the commercial and the product concept, but Spenny ultimately went with it and forged feedback sheets from the children to show the judges. In the end, the three judges from an advertising firm felt that Kenny's ads would not appeal to a large demographic and did not promote the quality of the product. All three chose Spenny's campaign.
12	"Who Can Put On The Best Play?"	Kenny	Spenny read the Gettysburg Address dressed as Abraham Lincoln while Kenny sat on his head with his bare buttocks, and with a stove pipe hat painted on his back.	February 12, 2010
Spenny loves theatre and already had a play written. He performed a period piece called Louis et Marie: Une tragedie about King Louis XVI and Marie Antoinette during the French Revolution, and hired professional actors and coaches. Kenny performed a one-man show called Things Are Looking Up! (The Truth Behind The Holocaust, 9/11, Genetic Farming, And Some Of That Other Stuff), portraying a Jewish man from a shtetl living through the Holocaust and being sent to Auschwitz in a flippant and ridiculous manner. A talent agent judged the two plays, calling both "a complete mockery of theatre", but found Kenny's play more enjoyable.
13	"Who Can Stay On An Island The Longest?"	Kenny	Spenny got cornrows and wore them on the plane trip home.	February 19, 2010
Spenny planned for the two to travel to Ernst Thälmann Island near Cuba and attempt to survive in the wilderness, but Kenny told him that since Cuba is an island, they had to stay there to win the competition. Kenny claimed that his plan was to have a vacation at the expense of the network and then simply do a double-humiliation after having a great time in Cuba. Spenny rejected this and camped out in a tent on the resort. Eventually, he caved in and agreed with Kenny to have a fun time. Kenny suggested they go into the water, and as soon as Spenny swam far out into the water, Kenny said that Spenny had lost the competition because he had left the island.

=== Series finale ===
No.	Title	Winner	Humiliation	Original release date
1	"A Kenny vs. Spenny Christmas Special (Who Can Stay In A Christmas Tree The Longest?): SERIES FINALE"	Spenny (Spenny agreed to do the humiliation so long as Kenny said he "won")	Spenny had to kiss Kenny's buttcrack for 10 seconds. (Kenny agreed to Spenny during the competition that he would do the humiliation as long as it went down in the books as a win for Spenny.)	December 23, 2010
The boys competed to see who could stay within the branches of a Christmas tree. After many attempts to coerce Spenny out of his tree (including hiring two dwarfs made up as zombies to try to force him out), Kenny agreed to leave his tree (which Spenny considered as "winning") if Spenny would do the humiliation (which Kenny considered "winning"). Intercut between the competition segments were various Christmas-themed sketches, and a dramatization of A Christmas Carol with Spenny as Scrooge, and Kenny playing Jacob Marley and the three ghosts. However, Kenny turned it into an excuse to make fun of Spenny on every occasion, the latter eventually giving up and storming off the set.

== Summary of wins overall ==
Season	Spenny wins	Spenny wins by cheating	Kenny wins	Kenny wins by cheating	Draws (both lose)	Ties (no humiliation)
Pilot	0	0	1	1	0	0
1	8	1	16	10	1	1
2	5	2	7	4	1	0
3	3	0	9	4	1	0
4	3	0	6	3	0	0
5	2	0	7	4	1	0
6	2	1	11	1	0	0
Christmas Special (Series Finale)	1	0	0	0	0	0
Total	24	4	56	27	4	1
