= Kenny & Spenny: Paldemic =

2020 television special

- Written by: Sebastian Cluer; Kenny Hotz; Spencer Rice
- Directed by: Kenny Hotz; Sebastian Cluer
- Starring: Kenny Hotz; Spencer Rice
- Country of origin: Canada
- Original language: English

Production
- Cinematography: Sebastian Cluer; Matt Marek
- Editors: Marco Porsia; Ken Simpson
- Running time: 23 minutes
- Budget: $450,000

Original release
- Network: CBC Gem
- Release: November 20, 2020

Paldemic is a 2020 television special created as a follow-up of the show Kenny vs. Spenny which ended in 2010. The special reunites Kenny Hotz and Spencer Rice during the COVID-19 pandemic in Canada.

== Reception ==
The special was met with positive reviews. It received a nomination for Best Host, Web Program or Series at the 2021 Canadian Screen Awards.
