= Kenny vs. Spenny =

Canadian comedy television series

- Genre: Reality television Comedy
- Created by: Kenny Hotz; Spencer Rice
- Directed by: Kenny Hotz; Spencer Rice; Sebastian Cluer
- Starring: Kenny Hotz; Spencer Rice
- Composer: Richard Pell
- Country of origin: Canada
- No. of seasons: 6
- No. of episodes: 86 (list of episodes)

Production
- Cinematography: Sebastian Cluer
- Editors: Duncan Christie, Marco Porsia, Jay Tipping, Jamie Hebbard
- Running time: 22–23 minutes excluding commercials

Original release
- Network: CBC Television (2003–2004); Showcase (2005–2010)
- Release: August 26, 2003 – December 23, 2010

Related
- Testees; Kenny Hotz's Triumph of the Will; Single White Spenny

Kenny vs. Spenny is a Canadian reality comedy television series starring Kenny Hotz and Spencer Rice where they face against each other in competitions. The loser of each episode performs an act of humiliation, usually selected by the winner. Hotz and Rice created the series in addition to serving as executive producers, and it was typically shot in their hometown of Toronto (the pilot was filmed in Los Angeles), based mostly out of the house they shared. As of November 2008, the show aired on CBC, Global and Showcase in Canada, Comedy Central in Germany, Sweden and the Netherlands, The Comedy Channel in Australia, Animax and later, Sony MAX, in South Africa, Italia 2 in Italy, FX in Portugal, and on Jim in Finland. The series concluded with an hour-long Christmas special that aired on December 23, 2010, at 9 pm ET/PT on Showcase. It aired in Latin America on Sony Spin for a short time.

The series was nominated for the Canadian Comedy Awards in 2010 and 2011 and for Gemini Awards in 2005, 2006, and 2008 as the best Canadian comedy series, and received a Rose d'Or nomination in Switzerland for "best international comedy series". The show has spawned several replicas of its format, including a family-friendly French Canadian version called Frank vs Girard that airs on VRAK.TV. Also following the format are Ed vs. Spencer in the United Kingdom, Juan vs. Roman in Colombia, Elton vs. Simon in Germany, Katja vs. Bridget, Dennis vs. Valerio in the Netherlands, and Sid vs. Varun in India. In 2009 the show was named #8 among the top 10 Canadian television shows of the decade.

== Premise ==
Kenneth "Kenny" Joel Hotz and Spencer "Spenny" Nolan Rice are two childhood best friends who compete against each other in a series of competitions. The loser of each competition must suffer a humiliation chosen by the winner.

The show's comedy depended on the polarizing personalities of Hotz and Rice, who are respectively extroverted and neurotic. Hotz embraced devious tactics during the show and often cheated, found loopholes in the rules for a competition, and intimidated Rice with insults, elaborate schemes and manipulation.

In contrast, Rice rarely cheated and tried to compete honestly. He felt he could retain some dignity if he promoted awareness of social or political causes, such as promoting awareness of climate change during "Who Can 69 The Longest?" or Irritable bowel syndrome during "Who Can Keep a Dump in their Pants the Longest?"

However, Hotz's strategies and jokes made Rice increasingly paranoid and short-tempered towards both Hotz and the production crew as the show progressed.

=== Common strategies used by Hotz and Rice ===
==== Rules ====
A repeating trend as the show progresses is how cheating is tolerated as long as the person is not caught, eventually becoming an unspoken rule, much to the chagrin of Spenny.

Part of the drama involves the multiple instances in which Kenny and Spenny argue about what the nature of the show should actually be. Spenny has argued that the point of the competitions is to find out who is the better man, and that while Kenny at times manages to genuinely outsmart Spenny, the moments in which he goes over the line ruins the purpose of the show. On the other hand Kenny holds less value in the "sanctity" of these competitions, repeatedly stating that the reason they compete is to humiliate the other person on TV.

Ultimately it becomes clear that their perspectives on what the nature of the show should be is motivated by creating a playing field that is biased towards their respective strengths.

Kenny’s approach to problem solving is to think outside of the box and to find a clever workaround, thus causing him to prefer rules that are minimal and vague. Spenny on the other hand prefers rules that are concrete, and tends to employ admirable if reductive strategies that rely on hard work as well as physical/mental endurance.

==== Cheating ====
Hotz cheated during 27 out of 56 of his victories, while Rice cheated during 5 of his 27 victories. In some cases, both Rice and Hotz were helped by their production crew, families and friends in their attempts to cheat. While Rice would cheat out of desperation, Hotz justified his cheating by arguing the loser is ultimately whoever does a humiliation.

==== Insults ====
Hotz regularly tried to make Rice annoyed during competitions so he would lose focus. Hotz regularly joked that Rice was a violent and emotionally disturbed man with a micropenis; that he engaged in rape, pedophilia, necrophilia, zoophilia, and incest; and that he was racist, an anti-Semite and related to Adolf Hitler.

Rice's family were also often the victims of Hotz's insults and jokes. Hotz regularly joked about having sex with Rice's mother and accused her of being sexually promiscuous and morbidly obese. In "Who Can Imitate the Other Guy Better?" Hotz—while pretending to be Rice—performed a song about being sexually abused as a child by Rice's grandfather.

==== Deception and intimidation ====
Hotz's main tactic was to deceive Rice and make him become angry or upset. In "Who Is Funnier?" Hotz drafted a letter from Ontario's health ministry that Rice had recently had sexual intercourse with someone who had tested positive for HIV/AIDS. Rice was too upset to complete his stand-up comedy routine at a Toronto Yuk Yuk's. Hotz used the prank as his entry. Rice was poisoned with lysergic acid diethylamide (LSD) during “Who Can Wear A Dead Octopus On Their Head The Longest?”

Hotz sometimes invented comedic characters and dressed in costumes to entertain the viewers and crew while antagonizing Rice. As an example, Hotz harassed Rice as "Silencio," and wore a white jumpsuit and lucha libre-style mask in "Who Can Stay Blindfolded The Longest?"

Rice often lost competitions because his paranoia made him sabotage his own efforts. In "Who Can Kiss More Women?" Rice believed Hotz was spying on him after a woman who recognized Rice from the show started helping him. Hotz said he did not know who the woman was.

During "Who Can Blow the Biggest Fart?" Hotz made a chili filled with an antiflatulent. Hotz blew air into his anus with a plastic tube and farted in front of Rice to make it appear like he had bigger farts. Rice ate some of the chilli and was unable to fart for the rest of the competition, which made him unable to do a big winning fart.

==== Use of family and friends ====
Hotz often recruited his family to help with his campaigns against Rice. His mother, Tzafi, was in 18 episodes and frequently helped her son. In "Who Can Win a Ten Mile Race?" Tzafi agreed to pretend to have died during filming of the episode after pretending to be sick. Hotz gave Rice a fake funeral time in the hopes Rice would not have enough time to win.

In "Who Can Dance the Longest?" Tzafi let Hotz hide in her home as Rice searched the house for him. In the same episode, his sister demanded payment from Rice in exchange for any information on Hotz's whereabouts and Hotz's brother refused to help.

Rice's family also appeared in the show. In "First One to Talk Loses," Hotz invited Rice's cousin to the house where they filmed for a date. Hotz hoped Rice would speak out in anger, but instead heard Hotz asking her "please?" when he tried kissing her. She returned to help Rice in "First Guy to Get a Boner Loses" and performed a striptease for Hotz. This failed because Hotz had asked his brother—who is a physician in Toronto—for a nerve block to temporarily stop erections.

In "Who Can Get Further With The Other Guy's Mom?" Rice took his robe off in front of Tzafi after he attempted to kiss her. Hotz got Rice's mother drunk and said he "could not legally say what happened," but smelled his finger and made a disgusted face to suggest he touched her genitals.

Friends and mutual friends were often used by both Rice and Hotz to help with plans or unnerve their opponent. Hotz regularly met with Hwang Goldfield, a practitioner of alternative medicine in Toronto’s Koreatown neighbourhood, for supplements and advice. The two had a falling out after Hotz tampered with products in the store and joked that Goldfield planned the September 11 attacks.

==== Involvement of the production crew ====
Both Hotz and Rice had their production crews get props and equipment, and get involved with strategies. Rice has admitted in interviews following the show’s end he agreed to let Hotz and the crew conspire against him in exchange for deciding each competitions rules.

Soundman Brendan Michie and unit co-ordinator Jamie Tiernay were frequent production crew members who helped Hotz. Michie used his skills as a pianist, guitarist and saxophone player to compose songs for Hotz. Tiernay was often an active participant in Hotz’s plans. In "Who Can Wear a Gorilla Suit the Longest?" Tiernay and Tzafi wore gorilla costumes to confuse Rice.

Rice regularly relied on his unit co-ordinator, Donny Rose, to help brainstorm strategies, stop Hotz from cheating, or foil Hotz's attempts to make Rice lose. Hotz fired Rose after two seasons because he felt he was giving too much help to Rice. During "First One to Talk Loses," Hotz reprimanded Rose for helping Rice become unglued from a dresser.

Rice also had production assistant Brian Peco and unit co-ordinator Kevin Morgan help with his plans and offer feedback. In "Who Can Make the Best Viral Video?" Rice's crew encouraged him to drink his own urine and post it online.

The crew were often used to disrupt competitions, act as judges and settle disputes over rules. During "Who Can 69 The Longest?" the crew got bored because Hotz and Rice had spent much of the start of the competition on a couch. The production crew and other people physically abused Hotz and Rice. The abuse ended when Rice quit after the two were sprayed with a fire hose from the Niagara Falls fire department.

In cases where both Rice and Hotz failed to win a competition, the crew chose a double humiliation for them. Both Hotz and Rice had to take a nude bath together following "Who Can Smoke More Weed?" and make out with each other after "Who Can Survive in the Woods the Longest?" They also joined humiliations. After "Who Can Win a Cockfight?" Hotz made Rice smoke a joint made from the crew's body hair. The crew vomited on Rice after "Who's the Best Soldier?"

== Production ==
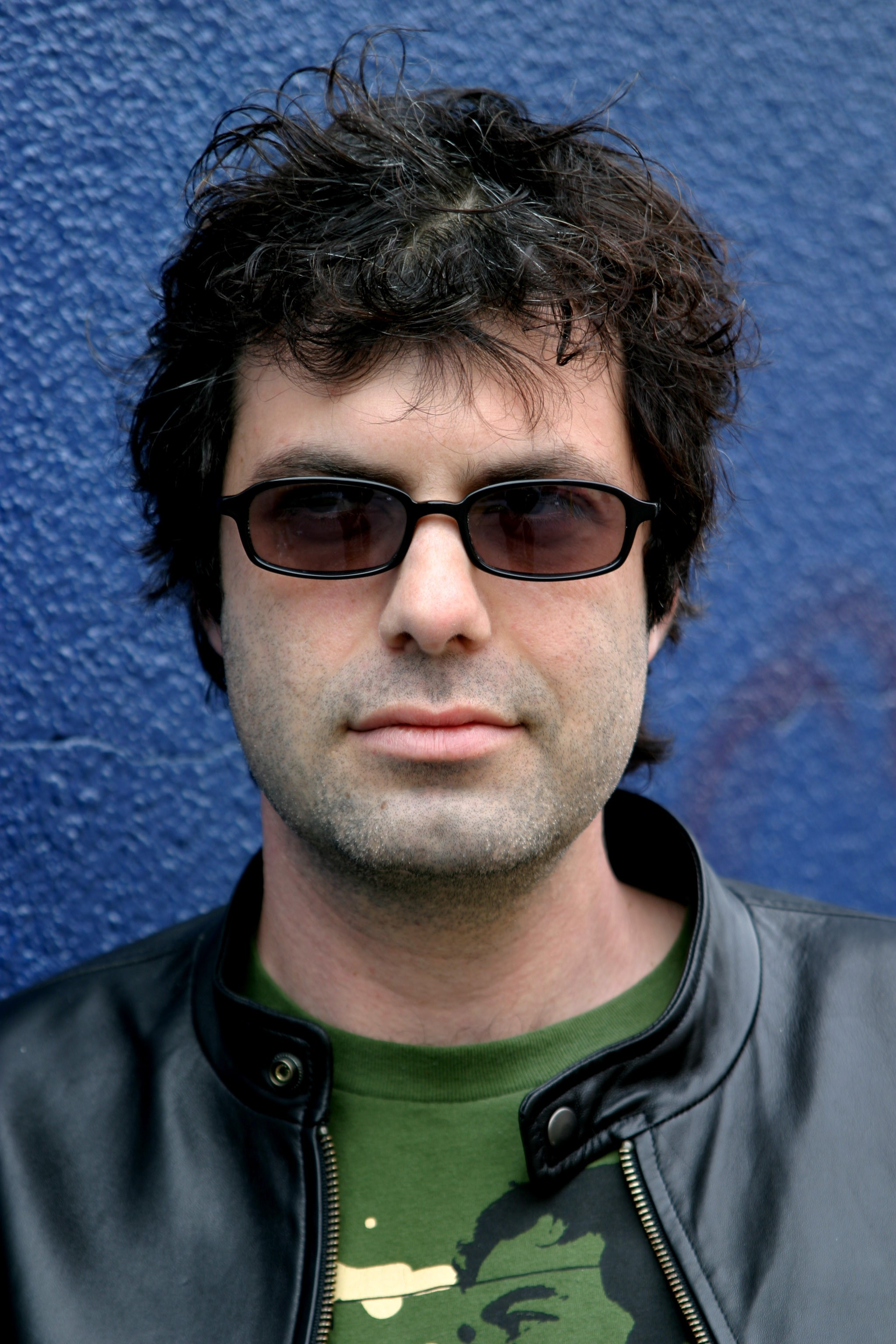
Kenny Hotz

Starting with the fourth season, Kenny and Spenny were both executive producers and received credit separate from five other executive producers. Matt Stone and Trey Parker, creators of the TV show South Park, joined the show for the fourth season and were given their own separate credit as executive producers for the ten episodes in which they were involved. Instrumental and electronic music is frequently used throughout episodes scored by Composer Richard Pell. Ride of the Valkyries, Ravel's Boléro, Sergei Prokofiev's Montagues and Capulets and Peter and the Wolf, Gioachino Rossini's La gazza ladra, Mozart's Symphony No. 40 in G minor – 4th Movement, and music by Toronto electronica band Holy Fuck are very frequently used.

Kenny and Spenny each had their own production assistant, camera operator, and sound engineer, who filmed their independent exploits for each episode. In the earlier seasons, the crew was shared between Kenny and Spenny. Crew members eventually split up into two teams, some joining Kenny's "side", and others joining Spenny's.

During the Industry Standard podcast, Kenny stated the series had a budget of 100,000 CAD per episode for the first season and 350,000 CAD per episode thereafter.

== Broadcasting ==
During an interview with George Stroumboulopoulos, Kenny states that Kenny vs. Spenny was originally made for MTV, where the duo was given $8,000 to develop a 3 minute pilot. However, MTV ultimately passed on the show for unknown reasons. He then states USA Network gave them $40,000 to shoot a full 22 minute pilot, but pulled the plug while the pilot was still in production. Kenny and Spenny both decided to finish the pilot anyway and eventually brought it to CBC Television where the show would first air. Despite the claims made by Kenny, the DVD release of Pitch states that the pilot for Kenny vs. Spenny was actually picked up by Canada's Life Network where the show was to go into production in 2001. This ultimately never happened. CBC cancelled the show after the first season, and Showcase Television picked up the series in late 2005. The show has switched broadcasters and been cancelled many times, including by Showcase, and again by CBC, when one of its commercials aired by accident during the network's "toddler block". Spenny has stated in multiple interviews that the main reason for CBC's cancelling of the show was because it aired right before CBC News, and news viewers tuning in early were offended by the show's humiliation segment.

It was produced by Breakthrough Films and Television since its inception. Re-runs of the first two seasons air on CBC late at night, and on CBC's Bold station weekday afternoons. Re-runs also aired on Showcase, and episodes of the show have aired on Shaw Media's Action. The show has aired on GSN in the United States. It is shown internationally on TV 2 Zulu in Denmark, Jim in Finland, the now defunct ZTV Norway, Comedy Central in Sweden, FX (repeats on Challenge) in the United Kingdom (no longer airing), The Comedy Channel in Australia, FX in Portugal, Comedy Central in Germany, Italia 2 in Italy, Comedy Central in the Netherlands and The XtraHOT channel in Israel. Fox Entertainment Group in Latin America has distributed the episodes, which can be seen on the Latin American versions of FOX channel and FX.

== Episodes ==
=== Christmas special ===
The series finale Kenny vs. Spenny Christmas Special aired December 23, 2010, at 9 pm eastern time on Showcase.

=== DVD releases ===
Video Service Corp has released all six seasons of Kenny vs. Spenny on DVD in Region 1 (Canada only). Beyond Home Entertainment has released the first three seasons on DVD in Region 4.

DVD Name	Number of episodes	Released for Region 1	Released for Region 4	Bonus features
Kenny vs Spenny: Season One	24	November 22, 2005	August 5, 2009	Kenny & Spenny commentary over two episodes, biographies, clips from international versions, Pitch
Kenny vs Spenny: Season Two	15	November 21, 2006	December 9, 2009	Season two promo, two commentaries with Kenny and Spenny, deleted scenes, season three preview
Kenny vs Spenny: Season Three	13	November 13, 2007	April 7, 2010	Kenny's never-before-seen version of "Who Can Make a Better Porno?", two commentaries with Kenny & Spenny, crew commentary, deleted scenes
Comedy Central's Kenny vs. Spenny – Volume One: Uncensored (Season Four)	10	August 12, 2008	TBA	Deleted scenes, additional scenes, commentary tracks, Kenny answers fan mail, Kenny and Spenny reflect on past competitions, Kenny and Spenny's hot mix, Who can pick the biggest booger?, Kenny and Spenny: Men on the Street
Kenny vs Spenny: Season Four	10	August 26, 2008	TBA	
Kenny vs Spenny: Season Five	10	November 24, 2009	TBA	Deleted scenes, commentary with the crew, commentary with Kenny and Spenny, commentary with Kenny and Spenny and the crew
Kenny vs Spenny: Season Six	13	September 7, 2010	TBA	Outtakes, photo gallery
Kenny vs. Spenny Christmas Special	1	TBA	TBA	

=== Streaming availability ===
Between November 7, 2012 and December 22, 2012, Hotz uploaded the series to his personal YouTube account. On January 22, 2016, Hotz took down the YouTube series (by setting the clips to private), as Rice objected to the episodes being available for free. Hotz stated in a tweet a few days later he was not happy with the removal.

In March 2018, all the videos were made available again on his channel. Following the 2020 protests over the murder of George Floyd, the two-part episode "Who Do Black Guys Like Better?" was privatized briefly by Hotz.

Hotz began re-uploading the series upscaled to 4K resolution in January 2022. These episodes were removed from the channel towards late March 2022, but re-uploaded later that summer. The episodes were also available on Breakthrough Entertainment's YouTube account but removed in December 2022. In July 2024, Kenny’s channel got a community guidelines violation and he moved some episodes to an alternative channel, Kenny Hotz TV.

Season 1 of the show is available on CBC Gem.

== Statistics ==
The records and winning percentages vary depending on the definition of a win used by each competitor. The interpretation of what constitutes cheating also varies depending on the competition and may lead to some discrepancies in the statistics.

	Wins	Losses	Draws	Winning % (W/W+L)	Win/Tie % (Ties = 1/2 Win)
Kenny	59	21	5	73.75%	72.35%
Spenny	21	59	5	26.25%	27.65%

- If competitions where Kenny cheated (16) or arguably cheated (3) and won are not counted, the record would be 40-21-5 for Kenny; If they are counted as wins for Spenny (as Spenny suggests they should), then Kenny and Spenny would be tied, each with a record of 40-40-5. Note though that Spenny cheated 8 times.

If the competition ends in a draw, there is either no humiliation, or a double humiliation. Although there have been exceptions to this rule.

== Other media ==
=== Kenny vs. Spenny: Versusville ===
Kenny vs. Spenny - Versusville
- The city of Versusville
- Developers: DC Studios, Dream Mechanics
- Publisher: Breakthrough Entertainment
- Designer: Kenny Hotz
- Composer: Steve Szczepkowski
- Series: Kenny vs. Spenny
- Engine: Trimorph
- Platform: Windows
- Release: June 19th 2004 - July 4th 2004 (Exact date unknown)
- Genres: First Person Shooter, Third Person Shooter, Racing Game
- Modes: Single-player, multiplayer

After the show first aired on CBC, a game was released based on the first season called Kenny vs. Spenny: Versusville. Versusville is a first-person shooter with 3D environments and 4 main game modes. It was released sometime between June and July 2004 on Windows and had online leaderboards and online multiplayer functionality.

The game was assumed lost after 2006 when the television show Kenny vs. Spenny moved from the CBC to Showcase. However, on November 4, 2021, Versusville was found by Reddit archivists Ben, Carson, John, and Metalock and has since been made available online with permission from Kenny Hotz, Ira Levy and Mark Greenshields.

==== Gameplay ====
Kenny vs. Spenny: Versusville contains 4 main game modes, with each having a unique gameplay style and 3 of which having once supported online multiplayer. Each game can be played from a first-person or third-person perspective.

- Residence Evil: A singleplayer-exclusive stealth game mode that originally acted as a tutorial, requiring the player to complete it in order to unlock the other 3 game modes. The map is a rough recreation of the house from Season One, where the player must open the vault without getting caught by Kenny or Spenny. Eventually a v2 was released, which no longer required the player to beat Residence Evil in order to unlock the other game modes.
- Wasteball: A multiplayer shooter where players would compete in slime-filled matches. The map is described as a disused building that has been transformed into a chemical waste paintball arena.
- Grave Rave: A multiplayer shooter where players must throw zombie parts in order to dispatch each other. The map is described as a late night cemetery filled with a gruesome array of weapons.
- Kart Dart: A multiplayer racing game where players must complete a certain number of laps and end with the most points. The vehicles are a selection of different shopping carts, with 3 unique maps all based on food markets.

==== Awards ====
Year	Nominee / work	Award	Result
2005	Kenny vs. Spenny: Versusville	Canadian New Media Award's Excellence in Gaming	Nominated

== Other appearances ==
A Flash game was released in early 2004 called Kenny vs Spenny: Quest for the Family Jewels on GSN's website.

== Revival attempts ==
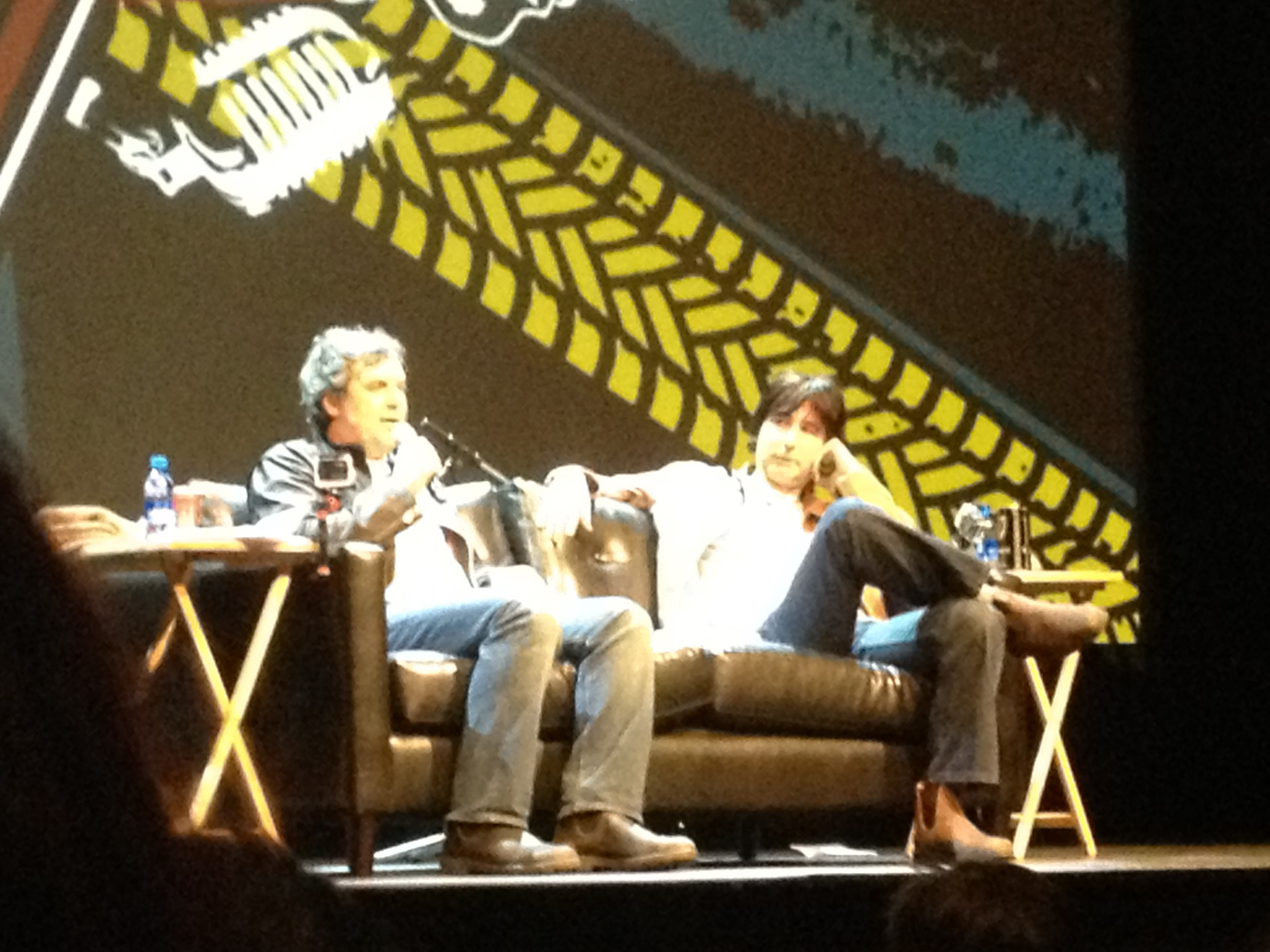
Kenny Hotz and Spencer Rice during a Kenny vs. Spenny vs. Canada show in Vancouver, Canada

Both Hotz and Rice have expressed interest in a film adaptation of Kenny vs. Spenny. In a 2013 interview, Rice elaborated, "if it happens I don't think I will live through it but it will be good entertainment." Later on March 7, 2014, Hotz began the Facebook and Twitter campaign #BringBackKvS in an effort to encourage Netflix to commission a seventh season of the show. Netflix had recently resurrected the Trailer Park Boys series from its 2008 finale, and it was Hotz's intention to replicate this success. Between March and May 2014, Hotz and Rice embarked on a 13-city Kenny vs. Spenny vs. Canada comedy tour, showing and discussing rare and unseen Kenny vs. Spenny footage that had been rejected by broadcasters. The tour was filmed for a Kickstarter-funded film titled Kenny vs Spenny: On The Road, however the campaign failed to meet its goal and the film was not released.

Hotz and Rice revisited their onscreen antics in the 2020 CBC Gem special Paldemic, which directly referenced Kenny vs. Spenny and its effect on their friendship and careers in the years since. They jointly received a Canadian Screen Award nomination for Best Host in a Web Program or Series at the 9th Canadian Screen Awards in 2021.
