= Pitch (film) =

- Directed by: Kenny Hotz; Spencer Rice
- Written by: Kenny Hotz; Spencer Rice
- Produced by: Raymond Massey
- Starring: Kenny Hotz; Spencer Rice
- Cinematography: Christopher J. Romeike
- Edited by: Daniel Sadler
- Production companies: Hollywood or Bust Productions; Hotz-Rice Productions Inc.
- Distributed by: The Asylum; Jane Balfour Films
- Release date: 1997
- Running time: 81 minutes
- Country: Canada
- Language: English

Pitch is a 1997 Canadian documentary created by Kenny Hotz and Spencer Rice, featuring themselves as two young filmmakers attending the Toronto International Film Festival to pitch a film concept to various celebrities.

Their film idea, titled The Dawn, concerns a Mafia don who goes for a hernia operation but gets a sex change instead. During the 1996 Toronto fest, they approach Roger Ebert, Norman Jewison (at a packed press conference), Eric Stoltz (leaving a limo), Al Pacino, and others without much success. On a roll, they leave Toronto for Hollywood, getting advice from Arthur Hiller and Neil Simon and finding an agent who expresses interest in their pitch. The film was shown at the 1997 Toronto Film Festival.

The film features songs by the Toronto band Phono-Comb.

== Trivia ==
In the Kenny vs. Spenny DVD commentary of the episode "Who Can Stay Handcuffed the Longest?", Spenny revealed that the film did not make the money they expected it to make. During the episode, Kenny flew in an old friend of Spenny's named David Wolfish who Spenny owed money to. Wolfish was one of the investors in the film, investing $10,000 but seeing no return. Wolfish later died in 2022.
