= Sebastian Cluer =

Canadian film and television director

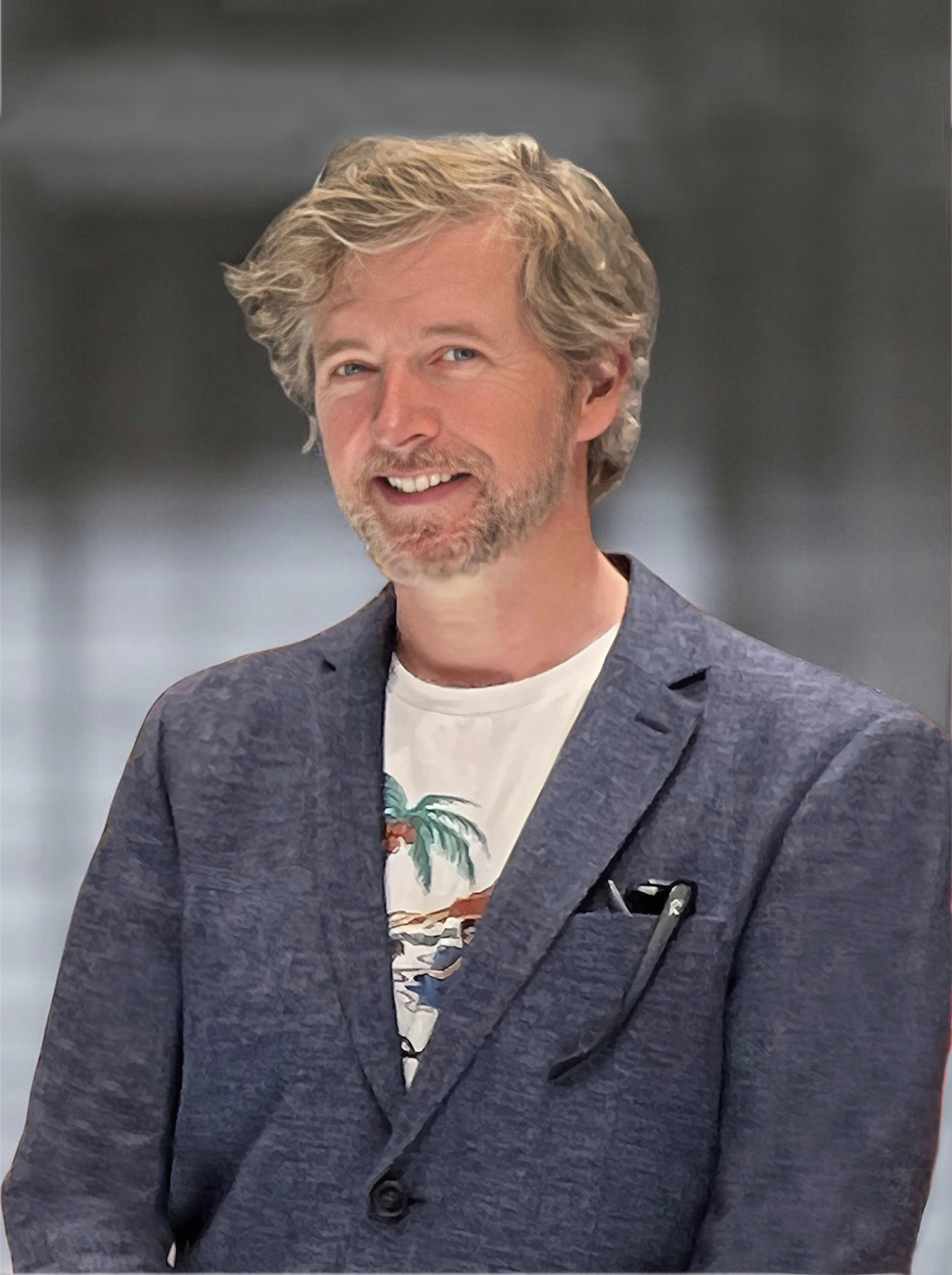
- Cluer in c. 2025
- Born: 1979 (age 46–47); Toronto, Ontario, Canada
- Education: School of Image Arts, Ryerson University
- Occupations: Television director; producer; writer; developer
- Years active: 1999–present
- Website: vimeo.com/cluer

Sebastian Cluer is a Canadian film and television director, producer, developer and writer. Cluer was born and raised in Toronto. He graduated from Ryerson University's New Media program at the School of Image Arts. He has worked professionally in many genres including comedy, drama, horror, factual and documentary.

His credits include The Office Movers, Still Standing, Kenny vs. Spenny, My 90-Year-Old Roommate, Decoys, Bollywed, The Ron James Show, My Paranormal Nightmare and Paranormal Nightshift. Cluer has been credited in both creative and technical roles (including director of photography and writer) across long-running series and short-form digital projects, and he continues to develop original material and collaborate on new series for Canadian and international broadcasters.

== Awards and nominations ==
Award	Year	Category	Nominee(s)	Result	Ref.
Banff Rockies Program Competition	2018	Best Music, Performance, Arts & Variety Program	Still Standing	Won	
Banff World Media Festival	2019	Best Web Series Fiction	My 90-Year-Old Roommate	Nominated	
Brooklyn Film Festival	2005	Audience Choice Award	The Papal Chase	Won	
Canadian Comedy Awards	2010	Best Comedy Writing	Kenny vs. Spenny	Nominated	
Canadian Comedy Awards	2011	Best Comedy Director	Kenny vs. Spenny (XMas Special)	Nominated	
Canadian Comedy Awards	2019	Best Comedy Director	Still Standing	Nominated	
Canadian Filmmakers' Festival	2005	People's Choice for Best Feature Film	The Papal Chase	Won	
Canadian Screen Awards	2012	Best Comedy Program or Series	Kenny Hotz's Triumph of the Will	Nominated	
Canadian Screen Awards	2016	Best Factual Program or Series	Still Standing	Won	
Canadian Screen Awards	2016	Best Factual Program or Series	Million Dollar Critic	Nominated	
Canadian Screen Awards	2016	Best Lifestyle Program or Series	Buy It, Fix It, Sell It	Nominated	
Canadian Screen Awards	2017	Best Direction in a Documentary or Factual Series	Still Standing ("Vanastra")	Nominated	
Canadian Screen Awards	2017	Best Factual Program or Series	Still Standing	Won	
Canadian Screen Awards	2019	Best Factual Series	Still Standing	Nominated	
Canadian Screen Awards	2020	Best Direction in a Documentary or Factual Series	Still Standing	Nominated	
Canadian Screen Awards	2024	Best Factual Series	Bollywed	Nominated	
Canadian Screen Awards	2024	Best Direction, Factual — "I Am Social Media"	Bollywed	Nominated	
Canadian Screen Awards	2025	Best Direction, Factual — "Opening Jitters"	Bollywed	Nominated	
Critics' Choice Real TV Awards	2024	Best Lifestyle Show: Fashion/Beauty	Bollywed	Nominated	
Gemini Awards	2004	Best Reality Based Entertainment Program or Series	Kenny vs. Spenny	Nominated	
Gemini Awards	2006	Best Comedy Program or Series	Kenny vs. Spenny	Nominated	
Gemini Awards	2008	Best Comedy Program or Series	Kenny vs. Spenny	Nominated	
Gemini Awards	2009	Best Lifestyle/Practical Information Series	Restaurant Makeover	Nominated	
Gemini Awards	2010	Best Ensemble Performance in a Comedy	Kenny vs. Spenny	Nominated	
Gemini Awards	2010	Best Lifestyle/Practical Information Series	Holmes Inspection	Nominated	
Rose d'Or	2004	Best Comedy Series (Lucerne, Switzerland)	Kenny vs. Spenny	Nominated	
TV Ehwards	2015	The Wayne & Shuster Award for Best Canadian Sketch Comedy Series	Still Standing	Won	
Whistler Film Festival	2004	Phillip Borsos Award	The Papal Chase	Won	
World Wide Comedy Awards	2021	Best TV Direction	Still Standing	Nominated	
