= Kenny Hotz =

Canadian comedy writer and television personality

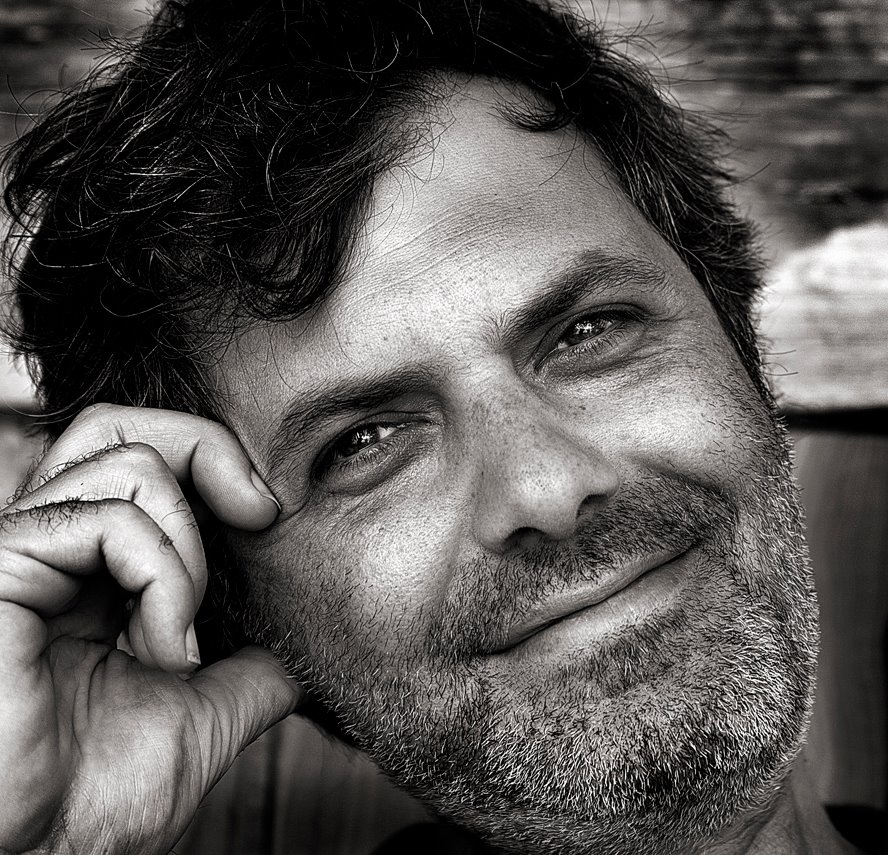
- Born: Kenneth Joel Hotz; May 3, 1967 (age 59); Toronto, Ontario, Canada
- Education: Ryerson Polytechnical Institute
- Occupations: Entertainer; screenwriter; producer; director
- Years active: 1994–present
- Spouse: Audrey Gair (2007–present)
- Children: 3
- Relatives: Joni Mitchell (godmother)
- Awards: Gemini Award; Canadian Comedy Award

YouTube information
- Channel: Kenny Hotz
- Years active: 2006–present
- Genre: Comedy
- Subscribers: 306 thousand
- Views: 14.8 million
- Last updated: May 24, 2025
- Website: kennyhotz.com

Kenneth Joel Hotz (born May 3, 1967) is a Canadian comedy writer, filmmaker, entertainer and television personality. He is best known as co-star of the former reality comedy show Kenny vs. Spenny (2003–2010) alongside Spencer Rice. Hotz is the creator of the FX series Testees, and Kenny Hotz's Triumph of the Will. Between 2004 and 2006, he served as a staff writer (and later occasional writer) for South Park. Hotz has directed a number of films, including Pitch, It Don't Cost Nothin' to Say Good Morning, The Papal Chase and Subscribe. He also co-directed the music video for the song "Monophobia" by Deadmau5. Hotz is a regular contributor for Vice Media and began his career as a war correspondent and photojournalist during the Gulf War.

== Early life and education ==
Hotz was born to a Jewish family and as a child attended the United Synagogue Day School, later graduating from Forest Hill Collegiate Institute. In 1992, Hotz graduated from the Media Arts program at the Ryerson Polytechnical Institute. Hotz met Spencer Rice in high school, and the pair later went on to direct films together and create Kenny vs Spenny. As a teenager and young adult, Hotz dealt cannabis.

== Career ==
=== Photo-journalism ===
Hotz began as a documentary filmmaker and news photographer, creating photo essays on subjects including Auschwitz, Dachau, and the Gulf War. Hotz was the only registered Canadian photo-journalist to cover the Gulf War. His additional photo essays also include Needle Park in Zürich, Switzerland, David Koresh, Mount Carmel, Romanian orphanages after Nicolae Ceauşescu and New Year's Eve 2000 in Times Square. Both national and provincial archives have purchased his work for their collections.

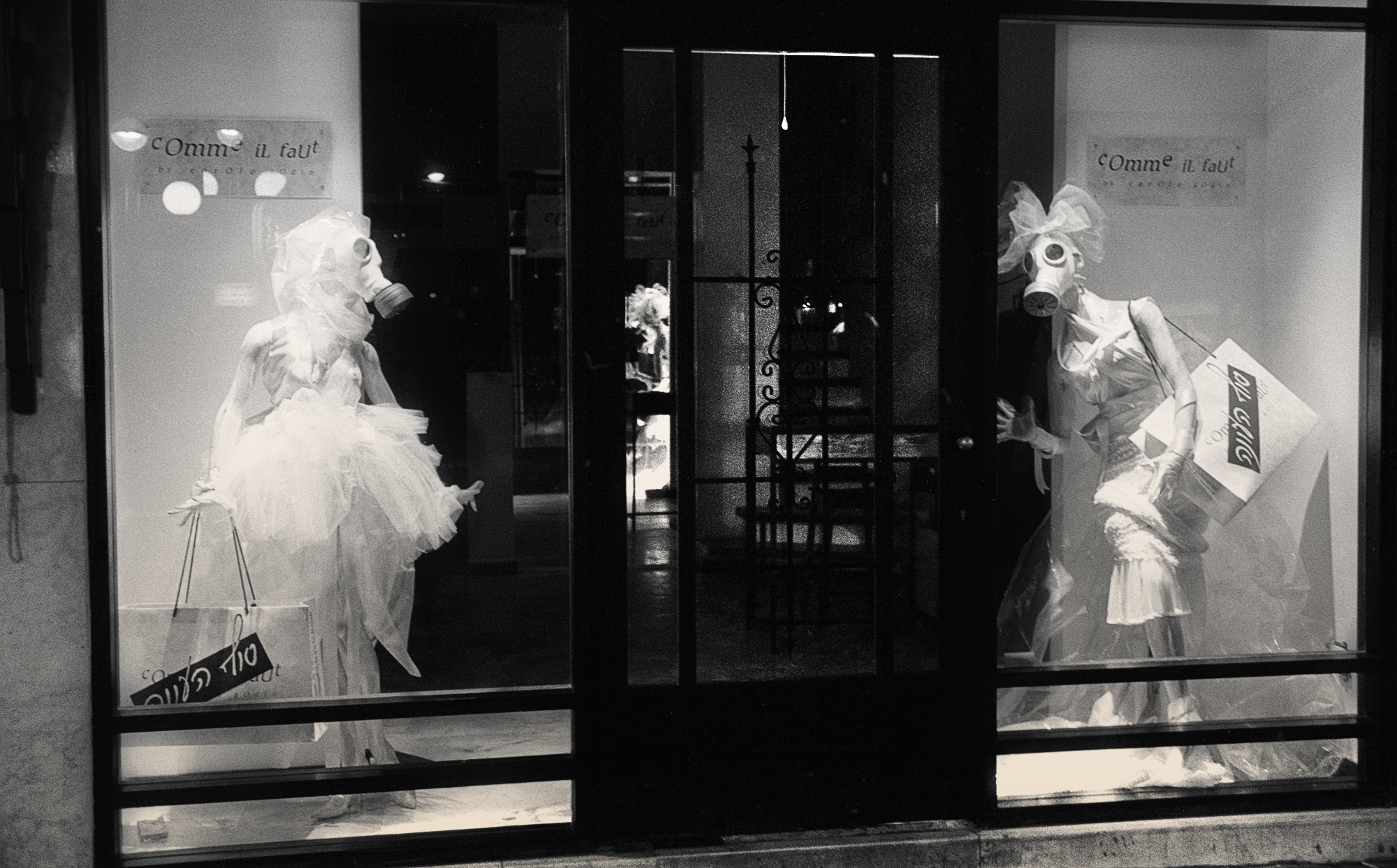
"Mannequins in wedding dresses", taken during the 1991 Gulf War by Kenny Hotz

=== Early film work ===
Hotz and Spencer Rice created the 18-minute short film It Don't Cost Nothin' to Say Good Morning.

In 1996, Hotz created and starred (with Rice) in the documentary Pitch which premiered at the Toronto International Film Festival in 1997. The film had numerous cameos including Al Pacino, Samuel Z. Arkoff and Neil Simon.

In 1997, he co-wrote an episode of Ninja Turtles: The Next Mutation with Rice, titled Truce or Consequences.

In 1999, Hotz moved with his long-time writing partner Rice to Los Angeles, where they worked on the development of the show Kenny vs. Spenny.

==== The Papal Chase ====
Hotz starred in his second feature film titled The Papal Chase, a documentary about Hotz trying to meet the Pope John Paul II, released in 2004. The film received the Phillip Borsos Award for Best Canadian Feature Film at the 2004 Whistler Film Festival, and in 2005 won the People's Choice Award for Best Canadian Feature at the Canadian Filmmakers Festival and the Audience Award for Best Documentary at the Brooklyn International Film Festival.

=== Kenny vs. Spenny ===
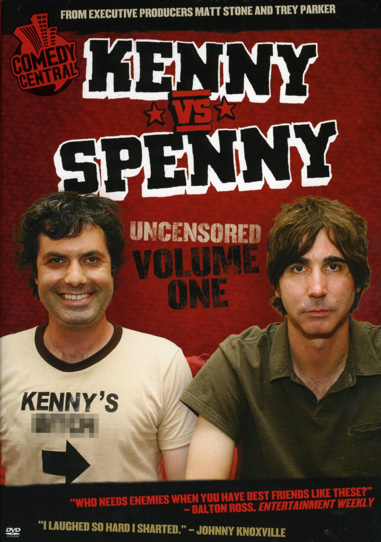
Comedy Central's Kenny vs. Spenny – Volume One DVD cover

Kenny vs. Spenny was first aired on CBC Television in 2003 and went on to be nominated for eight Gemini awards. The original pilot had been commissioned by USA Network, but never aired before the show was picked up by the CBC for 26 episodes. The series centred on Hotz and friend Spencer Rice as they competed against each other in competitions, the loser of which would perform a "humiliation". The show was embroiled in a deliberate controversy with the British Columbia Human Rights Commission for Hotz's actions in the episode Who Can Piss Off More People, where he paid to have a plane fly over Toronto dragging a banner that reads "Jesus Sucks". Though he claimed his friend Jesus was getting married and it was not directed towards a religion. The show moved from CBC to Showcase television in Canada after the nationally run CBC censored two episodes of Kenny vs. Spenny, refusing to air them on their network.

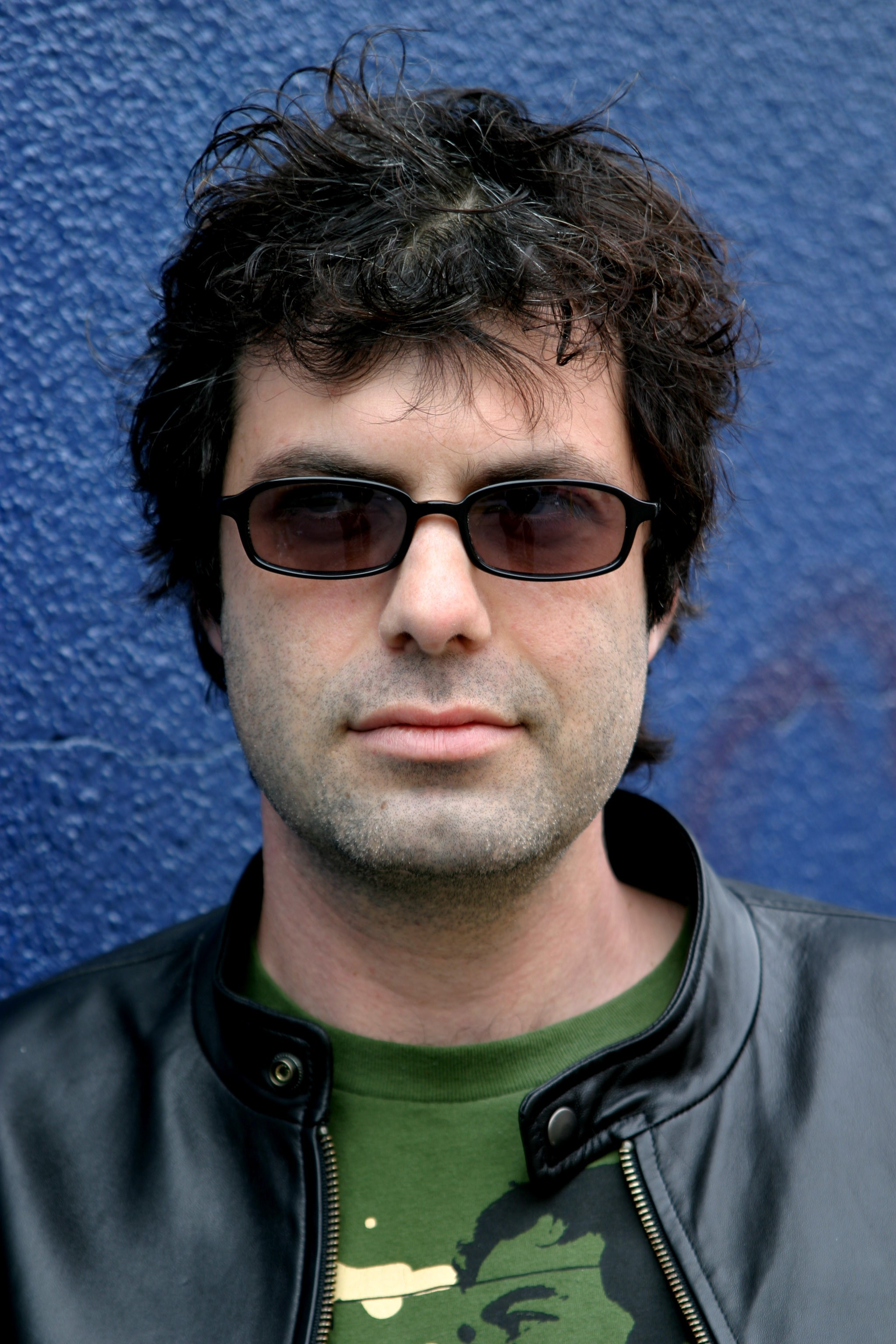
Hotz in 2006

In 2004, Hotz also created the concept for the videogame Versusville to accompany the television show, which was nominated for a Canadian New Media Award for Excellence in Gaming.

In 2009, Maclean's magazine named Kenny vs. Spenny the number eight pick in its list of the top ten Canadian television shows of the previous decade. The magazine said of the show and Kenny's on air role that, "Many episodes feature the evil Kenny destroying his supposed friend through deceit, trickery and blatant cheating." Hotz produced the German spinoff series Elton vs. Simon that aired between 2004 and 2006. Kenny vs. Spenny show was broadcast in over 25 countries and licensed globally, with remakes including Cenk vs. Erdem in Turkey, Juan vs. Roman in Colombia, Katja vs. Bridget in the Netherlands, and Ed vs. Spencer in the UK. This resulted in the show becoming the largest selling comedy format in Canadian television history. The show was named #8 among the top 10 Canadian television shows of the 21st century. In July 2013, the show was ranked as the highest rated reality television show by IMDb.

The last episode, ("The Kenny vs. Spenny Christmas Special"), was aired in 2010. The series produced 89 original episodes, over six seasons. Each of the main characters of the show would go on to have their own shows the following year.

In 2014, a fan campaign to have the show return to production on Netflix began, following Hotz's announcement that he and Spenny were planning the live comedy tour Kenny vs. Spenny vs. Canada. Also that year, Hotz and Rice designed a travelling stage show based on the show with a world tour of approximately 100 dates. Part of this tour included the Canadian national Kenny vs. Spenny vs. Canada tour.

In November 2020, along with Spencer Rice, Hotz directed, wrote and produced Kenny & Spenny: Paldemic, a CBC Gem special that focused on the pair's friendship and careers since Kenny vs. Spenny ended in 2010.

=== South Park and Comedy Central ===
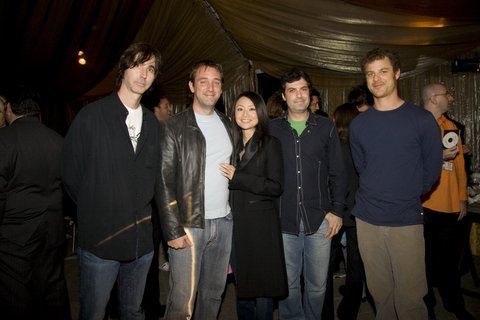
Hotz (second from right) with Spencer Rice and Kenny vs. Spenny executive producers Trey Parker and Matt Stone backstage at the Game Show Network

Hotz worked as a consultant and writer on South Park, providing material for episodes including "Follow That Egg!" and "Two Days Before the Day After Tomorrow". Between 2004 and 2006 Hotz was a consultant writer, and sometimes staff writer, for 42 different episodes of the show, returning again in 2012 to write for the episode "Cartman Finds Love". Trey Parker and Matt Stone, the creators of South Park, joined to help produce future episodes of Kenny vs. Spenny in the fall of 2007, when the show began airing on Comedy Central, becoming executive producers. They stated that they first came across the show while staying up late finishing their movie Team America: World Police, when they viewed the episode "Who Can Stay Awake the Longest?" from the show's first season. The Writers Guild of America named him and the rest of the South Park writing staff as the 63rd best writing team in television history.

=== Testees ===
In 2008, Hotz created the sitcom Testees for FX Networks, producing 13 shows centering on two roommates who work as guinea pigs for a mediocre product testing facility. The show produced 13 episodes and started airing in October 2008 on FX. Hotz stated that the inspiration of the series was Woody Allen's character Fielding Mellish in the film Bananas. The show met with positive reviews. In a review for The Washington Post, Tom Shales referred to the show as "wall-to-wall uproarious."

=== Kenny Hotz's Triumph of the Will ===
In 2011, Hotz starred and produced a new series titled Kenny Hotz's Triumph of the Will, which premiered on Canada's Action network on July 22, 2011. The series produced six episodes and showed Hotz attempting to complete major tasks that challenged the social assumptions of both his audience and himself, including the building of a Jewish funded mosque for Muslims, and finding his widowed mother a new boyfriend. The show was shot on location in countries including Canada, the US, and France.

=== Vice ===
Hotz is an executive producer, host and columnist for Vice, and won the publication's best fiction article of the year award in 2006. In 2015, he directed and starred in the Vice talk show Me on You. Then in 2016 Vice Media aired a TV special starring Hotz, entitled Getting an Election executive produced by Spike Jonze. It was nominated for the Academy of Canadian Television and Cinema award for Best Original Series produced for Digital Media – Non-Fiction. Hotz has also been involved as a spokesperson and on-stage presence at Vice Media project and network launches.

=== Other work ===
In 2013, Hotz signed a deal with Sirius Radio in the U.S. for a weekly radio show that airs in Canada and the United States. In 2015, he had a role in the film The Chickening, which premiered at the Toronto International Film Festival. He also served as the film's producer. In 2018, Hotz co-directed a music video for the track "Monophobia" by Deadmau5. The video was later nominated for the Prism Prize.

== Business ventures and involvement in restaurants ==
Hotz owned The Hoxton, a bar and music venue in Toronto which has since closed. In December 2013, The Hoxton was the site of an impromptu post-concert performance by Kanye West and Drake.

Hotz owns the Dog & Bear restaurant and bar in Toronto.

In 2018, Hotz was a judge for the Canada's Top 100 Restaurants competition.

== Personal life ==
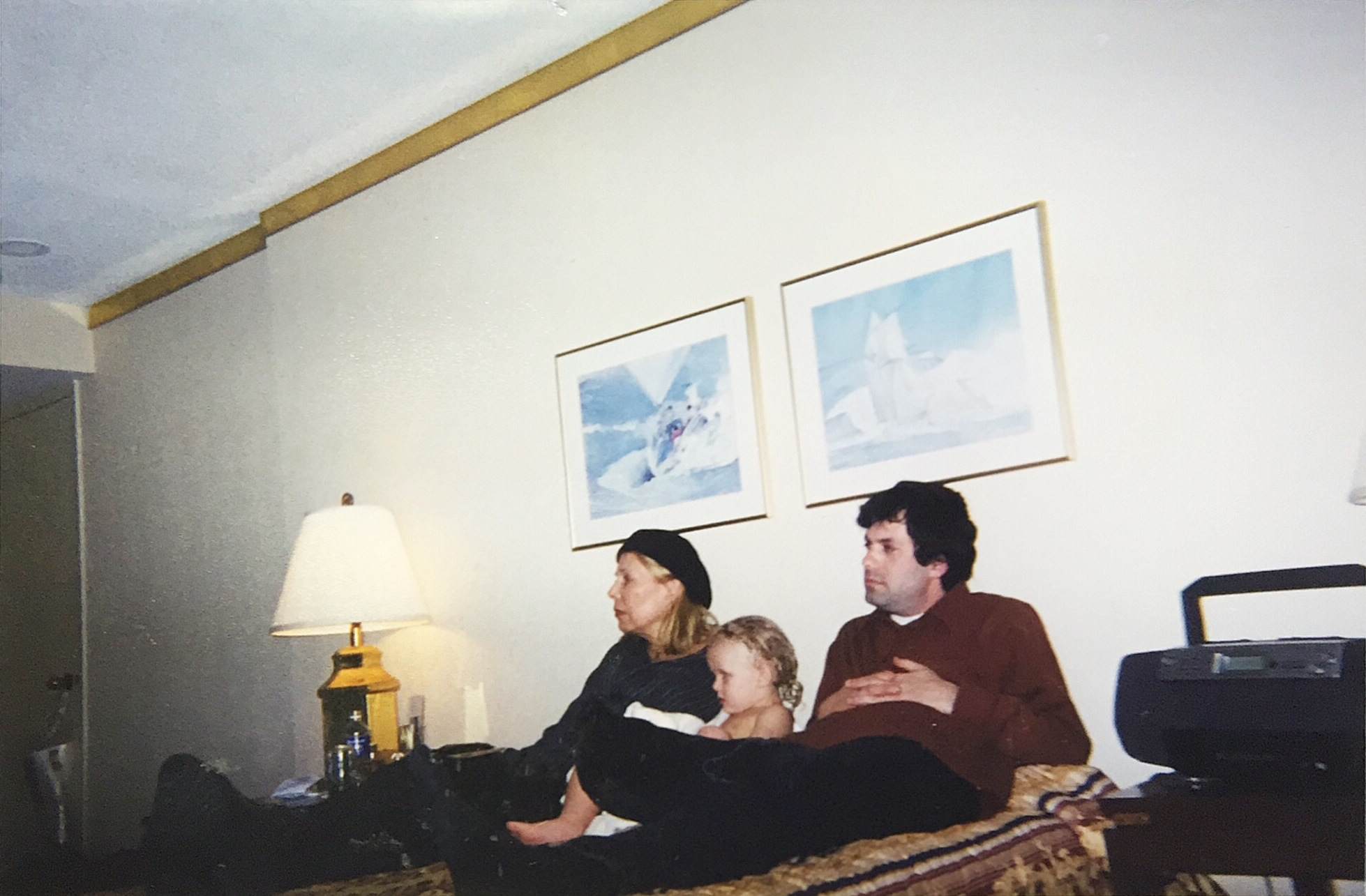
Hotz with Godmother Joni Mitchell in 1998

Hotz identifies as an atheist. He can speak Hebrew.

Hotz is the godson of folk singer Joni Mitchell.

In 2007, Hotz married former model Audrey Gair; the couple have three children.

== Filmography ==
Year	Format	Film	Role	Character
1994	Short film	It Don't Cost Nothin' to Say Good Morning	Director, DOP, editor	
1997	Television cartoon	Ninja Turtles: The Next Mutation	Writer	
1997	Feature-length documentary	Pitch	Creator, executive producer, writer, director, actor	Himself
2003–2010	Television comedy	Kenny vs. Spenny	Creator, executive producer, writer, director, actor	Kenny (himself)
2004	Feature-length documentary	The Papal Chase	Executive producer, writer, director, actor	Himself
2004–2006, 2012	Television comedy	South Park	Writer, consultant	
2005	Television comedy	Elton vs. Simon	Executive producer	
2007	Television comedy	Odd Job Jack	Voice	Clay Shogen
2008	Television comedy	Testees	Creator, executive producer, writer, director, actor	Larry
2008	Feature film (comedy)	Zack and Miri Make a Porno	Actor	Zack #2
2009	Television comedy	Pure Pwnage	Cameo	
2010	Feature film	Degrassi Takes Manhattan	Cameo	
2010	Television comedy special	Kenny vs. Spenny Christmas Special	Creator, executive producer, writer, director, actor	Kenny
2011	Television comedy	Kenny Hotz's Triumph of the Will	Executive producer, creator, writer, director, actor	Himself
2015	Vice Media	Me on You	Creator, executive producer, director, host	Himself
2015	Short film	The Chickening	Producer, actor	Lady in Bathtub
2016	Viceland special	Getting an Election	Creator, executive producer, writer, director, and Host	Himself
2017	Viceland special	All Things Human	Creator, executive producer, writer, director, host	Himself
2018	Music video	Monophobia	Co-director, host	
2020	TV special	Paldemic	Creator, executive producer, writer, director, host	

=== Appearances in other media ===
Date	Media
September 30, 2004	Late Night with Conan O'Brien
2005	Lingo
January 23, 2007	George Stroumboulopoulos Tonight
January 29, 2007	Tom Green Live!
September 18, 2007	George Stroumboulopoulos Tonight
October 9, 2007	George Stroumboulopoulos Tonight
March 14, 2008	Jimmy Kimmel Live!
March 18, 2008	Last Call with Carson Daly
March 21, 2008	Ed's Nite In
2008	MTV Cribs
2010	MTV Cribs
February 12, 2013	The Adam Carolla Show
April 2014	Coffee Run with Deadmau5
April 18, 2016	Getting an Election: A Canadian Trolls America

== Awards and nominations ==
=== Film and television ===
Year	Project	Award	Awarding Body	Result	Ref.
1996	It Don't Cost Nothin' to Say Good Morning	Best Canadian Documentary	Hot Docs Canadian International Documentary Festival	Won	
2002	Kenny vs. Spenny	Golden Rose of Montreux	Rose d'Or Light Entertainment Festival	Nominated	
2004	The Papal Chase	Phillip Borsos Award	Whistler Film Festival	Won	
2004	Kenny vs. Spenny	Best Comedy Program or Series	Gemini Awards	Won	
2005	The Papal Chase	Audience award (best documentary)	Brooklyn Film Festival	Won	
2005	The Papal Chase	Audience award (documentary)	Canadian Filmmakers' Festival	Won	
2006	Kenny vs. Spenny	Best Comedy Program or Series	Gemini Awards	Nominated	
2008	Kenny vs. Spenny	Best Comedy Program or Series	Gemini Awards	Nominated	
2009	Testees	Best Comedy Program or Series	Gemini Awards	Nominated	
2009	Testees	Best Comedy Writing in a Program or Series	Gemini Awards	Nominated	
2010	Kenny vs. Spenny	Best Ensemble Performance in a Comedy Program or Series	Gemini Awards	Nominated	
2010	Kenny vs. Spenny	Best Director in a Comedy Program or Series	Canadian Comedy Awards	Won	
2010	Kenny vs. Spenny	Best Writing in a Comedy Program or Series	Canadian Comedy Awards	Nominated	
2012	Kenny Hotz's Triumph of the Will	Best International Comedy Series	Banff World Media Festival	Nominated	
2012	Kenny Hotz's Triumph of the Will	Best Director in a Comedy Program or Series	Canadian Comedy Awards	Nominated	
2012	Kenny Hotz's Triumph of the Will	Comedy Person of the Year	Canadian Comedy Awards	Nominated	
2013	Kenny Hotz's Triumph of the Will	Best Comedy Program or Series	Canadian Screen Awards	Nominated	
2013	Kenny Hotz's Triumph of the Will	Best Photography in a Comedy Program or Series	Canadian Screen Awards	Nominated	
2016	Kenny Hotz's Getting an Election	Best Short	Canadian Comedy Awards	Won	
2016	Kenny Hotz	Comedic Artist of the Year	Canadian Comedy Awards	Nominated	
2016	The Chickening	Short Film Grand Jury Prize	Sundance Film Festival	Nominated	
2017	Kenny Hotz's Getting an Election	Best Original Program or Series produced for Digital Media – Non-Fiction	Canadian Screen Awards	Nominated	
2018	deadmau5: Monophobia (music video)	Best Music Video	Los Angeles Movie Awards	Nominated	
2019	deadmau5: Monophobia (music video)	Best Music Video	Berlin Music Video Awards	Nominated	
2019	deadmau5: Monophobia (music video)	Best Music Video	Independent Filmmakers Showcase IFS Film Festival	Won	
2019	deadmau5: Monophobia (music video)	Prism Prize	Prism Prize	Nominated	
2019	deadmau5: Monophobia (music video)	Best Music Video	Raindance Film Festival	Nominated	
2021	Subscribe	Outstanding Achievement Award	Calcutta International Cult Film Festival	Won	
2021	Paldemic	Best Host, Web Program or Series	Canadian Screen Awards	Nominated	
2021	Subscribe	Best commercial	DRUK International Film Festival	Won	
2021	Paldemic	Best Short Film	Rhode Island International Film Festival	Won	
2021	Paldemic	Grand Prix – Short Film	Golden Knight Film Festival	Won	
2021	Paldemic	Best Web Video	London Film Awards	Won	
2021	Paldemic	Best Comedy	Los Angeles Film Awards	Won	
2021	Subscribe	Gold World – Short Comedy	New York Film Festival	Won	
2021	Paldemic	Best Rogue Film	Seattle International Film Festival	Won	
2021	Paldemic	Best Rogue Director	Seattle International Film Festival	Won	
2021	Paldemic	Best Action Short Film / Web Series	Seattle International Film Festival	Won	
2021	Paldemic	Best Director TV / Web Series	Seattle International Film Festival	Nominated	
2022	Subscribe	Best Comedy Short	New York Comedy Festival	Won	
2022	Subscribe	Best advertisement	Royal Television Society	Won	

=== Writing ===
Year	Project	Award	Awarding Body	Result
2006	I Told My Friend He Had AIDS	First Annual Story Awards	Vice Magazine	Won

=== Honours and accolades ===
In November 2013, Hotz was nominated for the "Digital Personality of the Year" at the Canadian Digi Awards.

In 2013, he received the "Sovereign's Medal for Volunteers" from the Governor General of Canada for his work supporting childhood survivors of sexual abuse.
