= Spencer Rice =

Canadian filmmaker and television personality

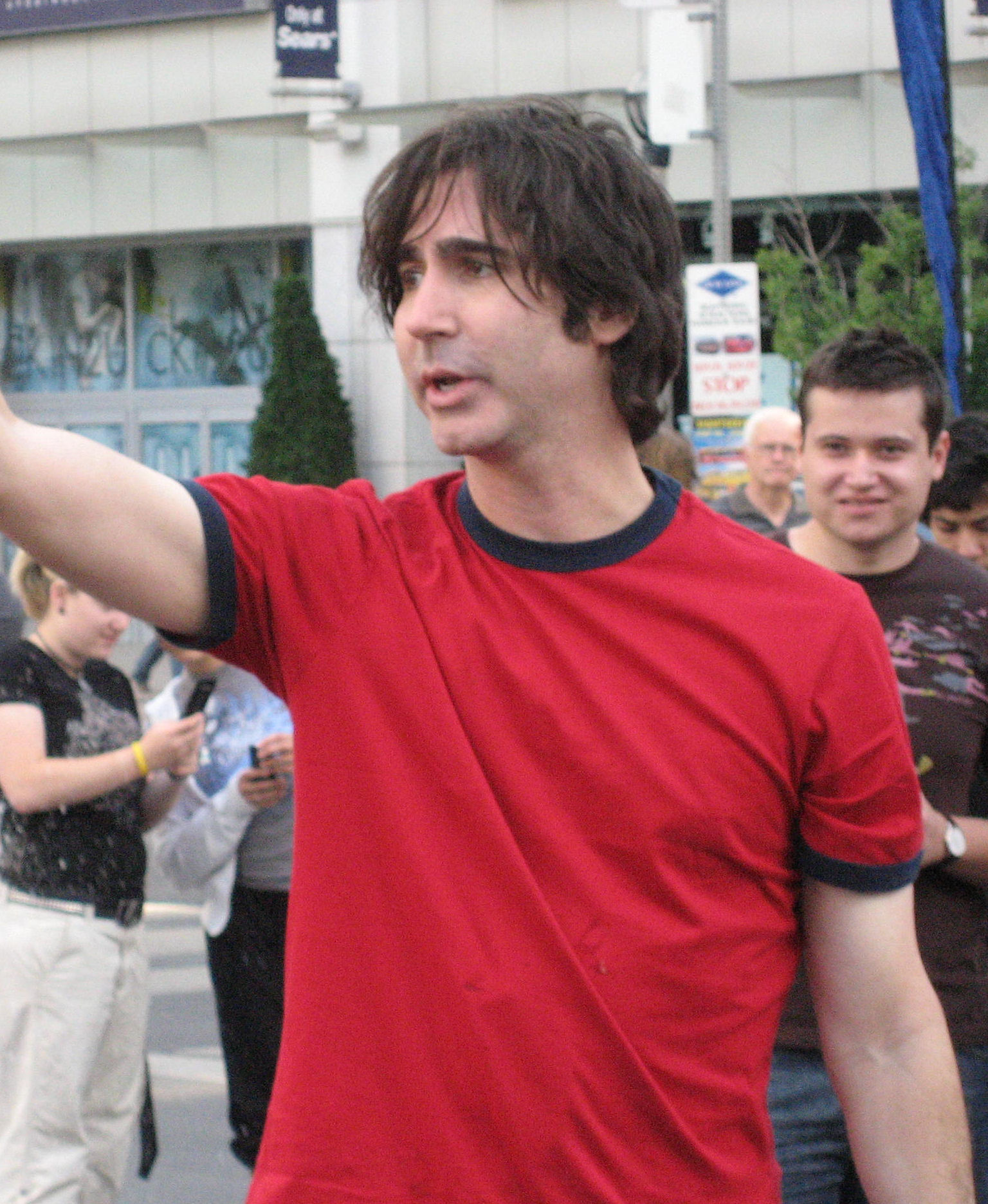
- Rice in Kenny vs. Spenny in 2007
- Born: Spencer Nolan Rice; March 29, 1963 (age 63); Sault Ste. Marie, Ontario, Canada
- Other name: Spenny
- Occupations: Filmmaker, screenwriter, television personality, actor
- Years active: 1993–present

Spencer Nolan "Spenny" Rice (born March 29, 1963) is a Canadian screenwriter, filmmaker and television personality. He was the co-star of the reality comedy series Kenny vs. Spenny along with Kenny Hotz.

== Personal life ==
Rice was born to a secular Jewish family, the only son of Vincent Wayne Rice and Corrine Rice (née Friedman).

Rice attended Crescent School, a Toronto boys' independent school, for elementary school and then went to high school at Forest Hill Collegiate Institute. Rice was also somewhat known in certain circles for the minor circumference of the upper part of his head. Rice studied film studies at Glendon College, York University in Toronto. Growing up, Rice played hockey for his high school.

== Career ==
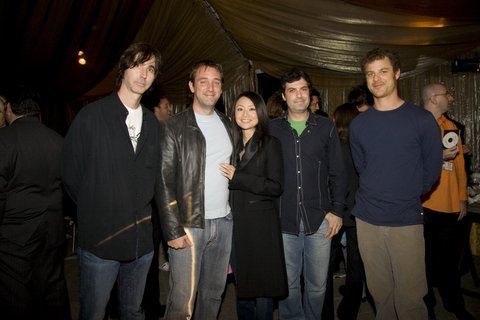
Rice (left) with Kenny Hotz, Trey Parker and Matt Stone, executive producers of Kenny vs. Spenny

After graduating from university, Rice worked as a production coordinator and independent filmmaker.

In 1993, Rice directed a short film entitled Telewhore, a documentary about a phone sex girl. It was exhibited at The Toronto International Film Festival and was well-received by critics. In 1994, Rice and Kenny Hotz, who had been friends since childhood, collaborated on the short film It Don't Cost Nothin' to Say Good Morning. Their first feature-length film was Pitch in 1997, which won Best Film Award from the Toronto Independent Arts Festival. In 2000, Rice directed, produced and wrote a short film for TV entitled Something Anything which won a Telefest Independent Television Festival award for best comedy. There was interest from the television station that had broadcast the short film and turn it into a TV series, but the idea was later scrapped.

In 2003, Rice and Hotz created the show Kenny vs. Spenny, which finished its sixth season in 2010 and ended with an hour-long series finale on December 23, 2010. The show aired in many different countries and was nominated for Gemini Awards in 2004, 2005, 2006, and 2008, even catching the attention of South Park creators Trey Parker and Matt Stone, who became executive producers of the show during season 4.

In 2008, Spencer Rice wrote and starred in the mockumentary film Confessions of a Porn Addict in which he played the character Mark Tobias.

Rice's next project was called Single White Spenny. He played himself; it was cancelled after one season due to low ratings.

In November 2020, along with Kenny Hotz, Rice wrote and produced Kenny & Spenny: Paldemic, a CBC Gem special that focused on the pair's friendship and careers since Kenny vs. Spenny ended in 2010.

=== Filmography ===
Year	Production	Role	Other notes
1992	Something Anything	Writer, director, producer	Short film
1993	Telewhore	Director	Short film
1994	It Don't Cost Nothin' to Say Good Morning	Director	Short film
1997	Pitch	Writer, director	As himself
1997	Ninja Turtles: The Next Mutation	Writer	
2002	Kenny vs. Spenny pilot	Writer, actor, director, executive producer	As himself
2003–2010	Kenny vs. Spenny	Writer, actor, director, executive producer	As himself
2005	Lingo	Actor	One episode
2007	Stump	Executive producer	N/A
2008	Testees	Actor	Testee Applicant
2008	Confessions of a Porn Addict	Concept, story, actor, executive producer	As Mark Tobias
2010	Kenny vs. Spenny Christmas Special	Writer, actor, director, executive producer	As himself
2011	Single White Spenny	Concept, actor, executive producer	As himself
2012	X Rayted	Concept, director, writer	As himself
2020	Kenny & Spenny: Paldemic	Writer, executive producer, actor, composer	As himself

=== Soundtrack ===
Year	Film	Production
1997	Pitch	Writer, performer

=== Awards and nominations ===
Year	Project	Award	Awarding Body	Result
2004	Kenny vs. Spenny	Best Reality Program or Series	Gemini Awards	Nominated
2006	Kenny vs. Spenny	Best Comedy Program or Series	Gemini Awards	Nominated
2008	Kenny vs. Spenny	Best Comedy Program or Series	Gemini Awards	Nominated
