= Showcase (Canadian TV channel) =

Canadian television channel

- Country: Canada
- Broadcast area: Nationwide

Programming
- Language: English
- Picture format: 1080i HDTV

Ownership
- Owner: Corus Entertainment (Showcase Television Inc.)
- Sister channels: W Network; MovieTime; Lifetime; Adult Swim; Home Network; Flavour Network; W Network; Slice; National Geographic; Nat Geo Wild; History; Global

History
- Launched: January 1, 1995; 31 years ago

Links
- Website: showcase.ca

Availability

Streaming media
- StackTV: Internet Protocol television

Showcase is a Canadian English-language specialty channel owned by Corus Entertainment. Launched in 1995, the network primarily airs general entertainment programming, particularly action and drama series and films.

== History ==
Licensed in 1994, Showcase was a venture between Alliance Communications (prior to its merger with Atlantis), the Canadian Broadcasting Corporation and a number of smaller independent Canadian producers, and was intended to be a showcase for "the best of independently-produced movies, drama, comedy and mini-series from Canada and around the world", with limited content from the United States.

Showcase logo, 1995–2009.

Showcase was formerly subject to a condition of licence obligating it to air 100% Canadian content between 7:00 p.m. and 10:00 p.m. in the time zone of the originating feed. While some foreign programming did air in the late afternoon prior to this window, any foreign programming subject to watershed restrictions was required to air at 10:00 p.m. ET or later per the Code of Ethics agreed upon by the industry. For a few years beginning in fall 2005, when the channel was drawing most of its highest ratings for programming acquired from American cable networks, Showcase promoted 10:00 p.m. as its flagship timeslot; in one marketing campaign, the network hired branded taxis in major markets to drive people home for free by 10:00 p.m.

Showcase later spawned two digital television services, the male-oriented Action (formerly Showcase Action, which rebranded and relaunched as a Canadian version of Adult Swim in April 2019) and the more female-oriented Showcase Diva (which rebranded to a Canadian version of Lifetime in 2012). On December 19, 2006, Alliance Atlantis launched a high definition simulcast of Showcase, available through all major television providers in Canada.

After several acquisitions over the years, Alliance Atlantis gained full control of Showcase. On January 18, 2008, a joint venture between Canwest and Goldman Sachs Alternatives known as CW Media bought Alliance Atlantis and gained AAC's interest in Showcase. Following its acquisition by Canwest, the channel's new management felt that Showcase's adult programming was alienating viewers and advertisers. On August 31, 2009, Showcase underwent a major rebranding, introducing a new three-dimensional logo, and a new programming lineup with a greater focus on hit dramas (such as Bones and NCIS) and feature films to make the channel more attractive to viewers and advertisers.

On October 27, 2010, ownership changed again as Shaw Communications gained control of Showcase as a result of its acquisition of Canwest and Goldman Sachs' interest in CW Media.

For the Fall 2013 season, Showcase unveiled a new slogan and branding campaign: "Character is Everything". The four-week marketing campaign was highlighted by promos narrated by characters from Showcase's series in first-person. An interactive website was created by Stitch Media. On it, viewers can create their own trailers for Showcase programming based on their own character.

On March 30, 2015, to commemorate the 20th anniversary of the network's launch, Showcase introduced a new logo inspired by its pre-2009 branding, and the new slogan "Beyond Ordinary".

In April 2016, as part of a reorganization of Shaw's assets, Showcase was acquired by Corus Entertainment.

== Programming ==
Logo used from 2009 to 2015.

Showcase primarily airs syndicated reruns of current and former network drama series (in particular, series that had been acquired or commissioned by sister network Global), including NCIS, FBI, and their spin-offs among others. The network also airs mainstream feature films, particularly on weekends. Since June 2020, the network has jointly held Canadian linear television rights to Peacock original series (excluding DreamWorks Animation television series, whose library rights are held by WildBrain as part of an existing agreement) and Sky Studios productions with sister network W Network.

In its early years, Showcase was known for airing provocative and risqué programming. The channel offered a nightly film presentation known as The Showcase Revue; initially hosted by actors Chas Lawther and Linda Griffith, it featured uncut airings of cult foreign films, often drawing from releases distributed in Canada by sister company Alliance Films. A Friday-night block known as "Fridays Without Borders" (a reference to its slogan at the time, "Television Without Borders") focused upon eroticism-themed shows and films.

=== Original programming ===
In the 2000s, Showcase became known for its original productions, including Paradise Falls, KinK, and Naked Josh. Another of these shows—the low-budget Trailer Park Boys—became a bona fide national phenomenon, spawning DVDs, merchandising tie-ins, and three feature films (Trailer Park Boys: The Movie, Trailer Park Boys: Countdown to Liquor Day, and Trailer Park Boys: Don't Legalize It).

In the 2010s, the network's original programming shifted towards science fiction and fantasy programming, as well as co-productions. In 2010, a new original series, the supernatural crime drama Lost Girl, brought Showcase its highest-rated series premiere ever with around 400,000 viewers. This was bested less than two years later by the debut of another original sci-fi series, Continuum, which had an average audience of 900,000 viewers. Copper premiered in 2012 as a co-production with BBC America. In 2016, Showcase and Netflix co-commissioned the sci-fi series Travelers from Stargate SG-1 co-creator Brad Wright; Showcase and Netflix renewed the series for a second season, but Showcase dropped the series afterward (with season 3 being commissioned solely by Netflix).

Includes programs co-commissioned with international broadcasters.

- Queer as Folk (2000–2005)
- KinK (2001–2006)
- Trailer Park Boys (2001–2008)
- Paradise Falls (2001, 2004, 2007)
- Bliss (2002–2004)
- Slings & Arrows (2003–2006)
- Moccasin Flats (2003–2006)
- Kenny vs. Spenny (2003–2010)
- Show Me Yours (2004–2005)
- Naked Josh (2004–2006)
- It's Me...Gerald (2005)
- Webdreams (2005–2008)
- Rent-a-Goalie (2006–2008)
- Billable Hours (2006–2008)
- Moose TV (2007–2008)
- Testees (2008–2009)
- Cra$h & Burn (2009)
- Exes & Ohs (2009–2010)
- The Foundation (2009–2010)
- Pure Pwnage (2010–2011)
- Lost Girl (2010–2015)
- Haven (2010–2015)
- Almost Heroes (2011)
- Endgame (2011)
- King (2011–2012)
- Single White Spenny (2011)
- XIII: The Series (2011–2013)
- Continuum (2012–2015)
- Travelers (2016–2017, season three was solely produced by Netflix)
