= Testees =

- Genre: Comedy
- Created by: Kenny Hotz
- Starring: Steve Markle; Jeff Kassel; Joe Pingue
- Country of origin: Canada
- Original language: English
- No. of seasons: 1
- No. of episodes: 13

Production
- Executive producers: Kenny Hotz; Derek Harvie
- Running time: 19-21 minutes
- Production companies: Blueprint Entertainment; Cinefornia Pictures; Canwest; FX Productions

Original release
- Network: FX (United States); Showcase (Canada)
- Release: October 9, 2008 – January 1, 2009

Testees is a Canadian television series created by Kenny Hotz, and written and produced by Kenny Hotz and Derek Harvie. It originally aired on FX and ran from October 9, 2008, to January 1, 2009. It debuted on October 14, 2008, on Showcase in Canada. The show was filmed in Toronto and Hamilton, Ontario. After one season, Testees was not renewed by FX.

== Premise ==
The series follows two friends (Steve Markle and Jeff Kassel) as they work as human test subjects at Testico, a product testing facility. Besides being an obvious play on testes, including the descended double "e" in its logo, the show's title plays up the vulnerability of test subjects, which is the source of much of the humor in the series. Two close friends are employed as guinea pigs for a pharmaceutical company. Each episode deals with the different "Research Products" given to the "Test Subjects". There are other stories playing throughout the seasons.

== Episodes ==
No.	Title	Directed by	Written by	Original release date
1	"Gas Pills"	Samir Rehem	Kenny Hotz	October 9, 2008
Peter and Ron are best friends and roommates who make a living as guinea pigs for "Testico", a drug and product testing facility. After being the test subjects for a new pill, it seems Peter is pregnant. Meanwhile, testee Larry displays his condition to convince the reluctant receptionist Amy into having sex, but premature ejaculation makes her question if it was worth it.
2	"Pill For Men"	Samir Rehem	Kenny Hotz	October 16, 2008
After going through a gender reassignment procedure Ron and Peter become women for three days; Nugget tries to impress his father by letting him meet his new fiancée. Peter, his father, then makes an indecent proposal; and Ron runs into one of his ex's after Kate introduces him to a group of lesbians.
3	"Forget Me Nugget"	Samir Rehem	Kenny Hotz	October 23, 2008
After losing their memory testing new method of brain washing, Nugget convinces Ron and Peter that they are gay, so he can get revenge on the two for getting him a male stripper for his birthday party; Kate runs for the city's zoning commissioner, as a hard right wing conservative, so she can get a patio for her bar.
4	"Vac Attack"	Ben Weinstein	Kenny Hotz	October 30, 2008
Ron and Peter get to test out a new military-grade vacuum. After getting it, it begins attacking them for their messy lifestyles. After finding graffiti in the bathroom of her bar, Kate asks Nugget to watch out to find out who's doing it, instead he turns her bathroom into a five-star restaurant.
5	"Über-Glued"	Samir Rehem	Kenny Hotz	November 6, 2008
Ron and Peter test out a new super glue and a prank goes horribly wrong, resulting in Peter being super-glued to Ron's backside, which Ron ends up using to his advantage, by taking Amy out on a date; Nugget opens up his own sperm bank in Kate's bar.
6	"Her Fume"	Samir Rehem	Kenny Hotz	November 13, 2008
Ron and Peter test an experimental new pheromone spray that makes them irresistible...only to old, fat, unattractive women who are turned into zombies who try to rape Ron, Peter and Nugget.
7	"Kicking the Bucket List"	Samir Rehem	Kenny Hotz	November 20, 2008
Facing death, Ron and Peter realize they've never really lived. Meanwhile, Larry traps and sexually harasses a testee in an elevator, only to get turned on by her aggressive refusal fueled by an injected super strong PMS.
8	"Abstinence Underwear"	Samir Rehem	Kenny Hotz	November 27, 2008
Ron and Peter test out new chastity belts that emit an electrical charge when they get erections, after getting control of their erections and days left to go with the experiment they both meet women out of their league, so they must find a way to get the chastity belts off.
9	"Jelly Bean Omelettes"	Ian MacDonald	Kenny Hotz & Derek Harvie	December 4, 2008
Ron takes care of Peter after he is paralyzed by testing out a new muscle relaxant; Nugget sets up an art gallery show, for a painting he found in the dumpster and then says a quadriplegic Peter painted them.
10	"Mr. Pain and Danger Lad"	Samir Rehem	Kenny Hotz & Derek Harvie	December 11, 2008
When the doctors at Testico tell Ron and Peter they've lost the ability to feel pain, they turn into daredevils.
11	"Pineapple Shampoo"	Ian MacDonald	Kenny Hotz & Derek Harvie	December 18, 2008
A new shampoo leaves Ron and Peter blind, and Nugget sees the perfect opportunity to live rent free.
12	"Project X"	Ian MacDonald	Kenny Hotz, Derek Harvie & Jason Belleville	December 25, 2008
When Testico doesn't tell Ron and Peter what they are testing, the guys start to imagine symptoms everywhere. Meanwhile, Larry convinces Amy to become a testee for one day.
13	"Truth Serum"	Samir Rehem	Kenny Hotz & Derek Harvie	January 1, 2009
Ron and Peter test out a new truth serum for Testico, which unravels Peter's past and puts his friendship with Ron in jeopardy.

== Home releases ==
Paradox Entertainment released the entire series on DVD in Region 1 (Canada only) on February 22, 2011.

On April 26, 2011, Entertainment One released the entire series on DVD in the US.
