= Single White Spenny =

Canadian television series

- Genre: Sitcom; Mockumentary
- Created by: Spencer Rice; Howard Busgang; Stevie Ray Fromstein; Tom Nursall
- Written by: Howard Busgang; Stevie Ray Fromstein; Tom Nursall; Spencer Rice; Tracy Dawson
- Directed by: Ian Ross MacDonald; Peter Wellington; Duncan Christie; Rob L. Cohen; David Steinberg
- Starring: Spencer Rice
- Country of origin: Canada
- No. of seasons: 1
- No. of episodes: 8

Original release
- Network: Showcase
- Release: June 2 – July 21, 2011

Single White Spenny was a Canadian mockumentary television series that aired briefly on Showcase in 2011. The series chronicles the misadventures of a fictionalized version of Spencer Rice, played by himself, as he dates various women after his wife divorced him for being "an immature man-child emotionally incapable of a serious relationship."

The cast also included Deb McGrath, Amy Matysio, Peter Martin, Wayne Thomas Yorke and Nikki Payne.

The series premiered on June 2, 2011. It aired eight episodes, and was not renewed for a second season.
