= List of Lionsgate Television programs =

This is a list of television series produced, distributed or owned by Lionsgate Television, including subsidiaries Debmar-Mercury, Pilgrim Media Group, and Starz, and former companies Artisan Entertainment, eOne Television, Vestron Television, Trimark Pictures, Creative Differences Productions, Alliance Atlantis, Hearst Entertainment, and Tribune Entertainment.

== Lionsgate Television ==
Title	Years	Network	Notes
Buffalo Bill	1983–84	NBC	Distribution only; produced by Stampede Productions
Hope Island	1999–2000	PAX TV	co-production with Paramount Network Television and Paxson Entertainment; Distributed outside of the US and Canada by Paramount Global Content Distribution
Higher Ground	2000	Fox Family	co-production with Paramount Network Television, Crescent Entertainment, and WIC Entertainment; Distributed outside of the US and Canada by Paramount Global Content Distribution
Mysterious Ways	2000–02	PAX TV	co-production with Paxson Entertainment; Distributed outside of the US and Canada by Sony Pictures Television
Tracker	2001–02	Sci-Fi	co-production with Modern Entertainment and Future Film Group
The Ripping Friends	2001–02	Fox Kids	Distribution only; produced by Spümcø, Cambium, and Animagic
No Boundaries	2002	Global; The WB	co-production with Crescent Entertainment
Jeremiah	2002–04	Showtime	co-production with Platinum Studios, Jeremiah Productions, Inc., J. Michael Straczynski Productions, MGM Television and Showtime Networks
The Dead Zone	2002–07	USA Network	co-production with Crescent Entertainment (seasons 1–3), Morden Entertainment (seasons 1–3), The Piller/Segan Company, Dead Zone Production Company, Paramount Network Television (seasons 1–5) and CBS Paramount Television (season 6); Distributed outside of the US and Canada by Paramount Global Content Distribution
Missing	2003–06	Lifetime	co-production with NDG Productions and CHUM Television; Distributed outside of the US and Canada by Sony Pictures Television
5ive Days to Midnight	2004	Syfy	
Charlie Jade	2005	Syfy	co-production with CinéGroupe and CHUM Television
Wildfire	2005–08	ABC Family	
Grey's Anatomy	2005–present	ABC	inherited from The Mark Gordon Company and eOne Television co-production with 20th Television (previously ABC Signature), Shondaland, Trip the Light, and MMTV
Criminal Minds	2005–2027	CBS/Paramount+	inherited from The Mark Gordon Company and eOne Television co-production with 20th Television (previously ABC Signature), CBS Studios and Erica Messer Productions
Weeds	2005–12	Showtime	co-production with Tilted Productions and Showtime Networks
Bratz	2005–08	4Kids TV	Distribution only; produced by Mike Young Productions and MGA Entertainment
I Pity the Fool	2006	TV Land	co-production with Left/Right Productions
The Lost Room	2006	Syfy	
Lovespring International	2006	Lifetime	
The Dresden Files	2007	Syfy	co-production with Dresden Films and Saturn Films
Hidden Palms	2007	The CW	co-production with Outerbanks Entertainment and Lift Entertainment
The Kill Point	2007	Spike	co-production with Mandeville Films
Mad Men	2007–15	AMC	co-production with Weiner Bros. and Silvercup Studios
Heartland	2007–present	CBC	Distribution continued from eOne Television; produced by SEVEN24 Films and Dynamo Films
Speed Racer: The Next Generation	2008–13	Nicktoons	co-production with Speed Racer Enterprises, Animation Collective (season 1), Telegael (season 2) and Toonz Entertainment (season 2)
Fear Itself	2008	NBC	co-production with Fear Itself Productions and Industry Entertainment
Crash	2008–10	Starz	co-production with Starz Inc. and Yari Film Group
Nurse Jackie	2009–15	Showtime	co-production with Caryn Mandabach Productions, Madison Grain Elevator (seasons 1–4), De Long Lumber Company (seasons 1–4), Clyde Philips Productions (seasons 5–7), Jackson Group Entertainment and Showtime Networks; Distributed outside of the US and Canada by Paramount Global Content Distribution
Big Lake	2010	Comedy Central	co-production with Gary Sanchez Productions
Blue Mountain State	2010–11	Spike	co-production with Varsity Pictures
Running Wilde	2010–11	Fox	co-production with Tantamount Studios, Principato-Young Productions and 5 Hole Pictures
Boss	2011–12	Starz	co-production with Category 5 Entertainment, Grammnet Productions, Roya Productions, Old Friends Productions (season 1) and Small Wishes Productions (season 2)
Iceberg Hunters	2012	The Weather Channel	co-production with Rogue Atlas Productions
Anger Management	2012–14	FX	co-production with Revolution Studios, Mohawk Productions, Estevez/Sheen Productions, Twisted Television and Debmar-Mercury
Flea Market Flip	2012–19	HGTV/Great American Country	
Nashville	2012–18	ABC/CMT	co-production with Opry Entertainment, Walk & Chew Gum, Inc., Culter Productions (season 1), Small Wishes Productions, (seasons 1–4), The Bedford Falls Company (seasons 5–7) and ABC Studios (seasons 1–5)
Family Trade	2013	Game Show Network	co-production with Rogue Atlas Productions
Satisfaction	2013	CTV	co-production with DHX Media and Bell Media
Orange Is the New Black	2013–19	Netflix	co-production with Tilted Productions
Deal with It	2013–14	TBS	co-production with Alevy Productions, Banca Studio and Keshet Broadcasting
Tequila Sisters	2013–13	TV Guide Network	co-production with Rogue Atlas Productions
Saint George	2014	FX	co-production with Wind Dancer Films, Travieso Productions and 3 Arts Entertainment
Deion's Family Playbook	2014–15	OWN	co-production with Edmonds Entertainment, Prime Time Media Ventures and Rogue Atlas Productions
Chasing Life	2014–15	ABC Family	co-production with Kapital Entertainment, Televisa International and ABC Family Original Productions
Manhattan	2014–15	WGN America	co-production with Skydance Television and Tribune Studios
Partners	2014	FX	co-production with Robert L. Boyett Productions, Robert Horn Productions, Runteldat Productions and Grammnet Productions
Ascension	2014	Syfy	co-production with Universal Cable Productions, Sea to Sky Entertainment, Levens and Blumhouse Television
The Royals	2015–2018	E!	co-production with Universal Cable Productions, Mastermind Laboratories, and Varsity Pictures
Monica the Medium	2015–2016	Freeform	co-production with Trooper Entertainment
Casual	2015–2018	Hulu	
RocketJump: The Show	2015	Hulu	
Feed the Beast	2016	AMC	co-production with AMC Studios and Clyde Philips Productions
Greenleaf	2016–2020	OWN	co-production with Pine City and Harpo Films
Motherland	2016–2021	BBC Two	co-production with Merman, Delightful Industries (seasons 1–2) and Twofour (season 3)
MacGyver	2016–2021	CBS	co-production with 101st Street Entertainment (seasons 1–4), Atomic Monster and CBS Studios
Graves	2016–2017	Epix	
Nightcap	2016–2017	Pop	co-production with Dakota Pictures, Trout the Dog Productions, Free 90 Media, and Zero Point Zero Production
Revenge Body with Khloé Kardashian	2017–2018	E!	co-production with Rogue Atlas Productions, KhloMoney Productions, and Ryan Seacrest Productions
Kicking & Screaming	2017	Fox	co-production with Pulse Creative
Dimension 404	2017	Hulu	co-production with RocketJump
Dear White People	2017–2021	Netflix	co-production with SisterLee Productions, Culture Machine, Code Red, Homegrown Pictures and Roadside Attractions
Candy Crush	2017	CBS	co-production with Pulse Creative, King and CBS Television Studios
White Famous	2017	Showtime	co-production with Showtime Networks, Aggressive Mediocrity, Inc. and Foxxhole Productions
Step Up: High Water	2018–2022	YouTube Premium/Starz	co-production with Hollycake (seasons 1–2), Creative Extremists (season 3), Everheart Productions (season 3), Offspring Entertainment, Free Association and Picturestart (season 2–3)
The Joel McHale Show with Joel McHale	2018	Netflix	co-production with Pygmy Wolf Productions, Free Period Productions and Feigco Entertainment
The Rookie	2018–present	ABC	inherited from eOne Television co-production with 20th Television (previously ABC Signature) and Perfectman Pictures
Music City	2018–2019	CMT	co-production with Done and Done Productions
Kevin Hart: What the Fit	2018–2020	YouTube Premium	co-production with Pulse Creative and HartBeat Productions
Very Superstitious with George Lopez	2018	A&E	
Model Squad	2018	E!	co-production with Tropper Entertainment and IMG Original Content
You Kiddin' Me	2018	Facebook Watch	co-production with KKW Kontent
The Rook	2019	Starz	with Liberty Global, Character 7 and Carpool Entertainment
Ambitions	2019	OWN	with Will Packer Productions and Debmar-Mercury
Florida Girls	2019	Pop	with Jax Media, Chinncorporated and 3 Arts Entertainment
Chasing the Cure	2019	TNT	with B17 Entertainment and Motiv8 Media
The Goes Wrong Show	2019–2021	BBC One	co-production with Mischief Screen and Big Talk North
Kevin Hart: Don't F**k This Up	2019	Netflix	co-production with 3 Arts Entertainment, Magical Elves, HartBeat Productions and MakeMake
Zoey's Extraordinary Playlist	2020–2021	NBC	co-production with Universal Television, Zihuatanejo Productions, The Tannenbaum Company, PolyGram Entertainment and Feigco Entertainment
Mythic Quest	2020–2025	Apple TV+	co-production with 3 Arts Entertainment, Ubisoft Film & Television and RCG Productions
Love Life	2020–2021	HBO Max	co-production with Foxera, Feigco Entertainment, Let's Go Again, Inc. and Mandatory Snack
House of Ho	2020–2022	HBO Max	co-production with Wallin Chambers Entertainment
Power Book II: Ghost	2020–2024	Starz	co-production with End of Episode, Inc., G-Unit Films and Television Inc., Atmosphere Television, and CBS Studios
Seduced: Inside the NXIVM Cult	2020	Starz	
Home Economics	2021–2023	ABC	co-production with ABC Signature, Colton & Aboud and The Tannenbaum Company
Confronting a Serial Killer	2021	Starz	co-production with Third Eye Moving Picture Company and RadicalMedia
Run the World	2021–2023	Starz	co-production with SisterLee Productions
Blindspotting	2021–2023	Starz	co-production with Dreams with Friends Inc. and Snoot Entertainment; Based on the movie Blindspotting by Summit Entertainment
Power Book III: Raising Kanan	2021–2026	Starz	co-production with Ballpoint Productions, End of Episode, Inc., G-Unit Films and Television Inc., Atmosphere Television and CBS Studios
Heels	2021–2023	Starz	co-production with O'Malley Ink, LBI Entertainment and Paramount Television Studios
BMF	2021–2025	Starz	co-production with 8 Mile Sconi Productions and G-Unit Films and Television Inc.
Ghosts	2021–present	CBS	co-production with Joe Vs. Joe, Monumental Television, Left Right, BBC Studios America and CBS Studios; Based on the original British series by Mathew Baynton, Simon Farnaby, Martha Howe-Douglas, Jim Howick, Laurence Rickard and Ben Willbond
Acapulco	2021–2025	Apple TV+	co-production with Zihuatanejo Productions, The Tannenbaum Company and 3Pas Studios
The Freak Brothers	2021–present	Tubi	co-production with Pure Imagination Studios, Starburns Industries and WTG Enterprises
Yellowjackets	2021-2027	Showtime	continued from eOne Television co-production with Beer Christmas, Ltd, Lockjaw and Showtime Networks
Santa Inc.	2021	HBO Max	co-production with Rushfeld Productions, oh us., Point Grey Pictures and Stoopid Buddy Stoodios
The Real Dirty Dancing	2022	Fox	co-production with Eureka Productions
Welcome to Flatch	2022–2023	Fox	co-production with Fox Entertainment, BBC Studios America, Feigco Entertainment and Perkins Street Productions; Based on This Country by Daisy May Cooper and Charlie Cooper
Power Book IV: Force	2022–2026	Starz	co-production with Pull the Pin Productions, Inc., End of Episode, Inc., G-Unit Films and Television Inc., Atmosphere Television and CBS Studios
Shining Vale	2022-2023	Starz	co-production with Warner Bros. Television Studios, Other Shoe Productions, Merman and Kapital Entertainment; Originally developed at Showtime
Minx	2022–2023	HBO Max/Starz	co-production with Rapoport Industries, and Feigco Entertainment.
Julia	2022–2023	Max	co-production with 3 Arts Entertainment, Modern O Productions, Inc, and Mad Ben Productions.
Swimming with Sharks	2022	The Roku Channel	co-production with Debut Content; Based on the 1994 film of the same name by Trimark Pictures
The First Lady	2022	Showtime	co-production with Welle Entertainment and Pathless Woods Productions
P-Valley	2022–2027	Starz	co-production with Kat Buggy Productions; Season 2 onward
Selling the OC	2022-present	Netflix	co-production with Done and Done Productions
The Serpent Queen	2022–2024	Starz	co-production with 3 Arts Entertainment and about:blank
Dangerous Liaisons	2022	Starz	co-production with Playground Entertainment and Flame Ventures
The Recruit	2022–2025	Netflix	continued from eOne Television co-production with Hypnotic and Perfectman Pictures
Paul T. Goldman	2023	Peacock	co-production with Annapurna Television, Point Grey Pictures, Caviar and Swindle
The 1619 Project	2023	Hulu	co-production with Harpo Films, The New York Times and Old Story Up Productions
Party Down	2023	Starz	co-production with Tree and Spondoolie Productions; Season 3 only
Love & Death	2023	Max	co-production with David E. Kelley Productions, What Ever Lola Wants Productions, Blossom Films and Texas Monthly
Ladies First: A Story of Women in Hip-Hop	2023	Netflix	co-production with Culture House
The Continental: From the World of John Wick	2023	Peacock	co-production with Last Man Standing Films, Cool-ish Productions, Reese Wernick Productions, King of Brockton Inc and Thunder Road Films; Based on the film John Wick by Summit Entertainment; Originally developed at Starz
Gray	2023–present	Paramount+	co-production with AGC Television and IPR.VC
Extended Family	2023–2024	NBC	co-production with O'Malley Ink, Werner Entertainment and Universal Television
Hightown	2024	Starz	co-production with Jerry Bruckheimer Television; Season 3 only
Manhunt	2024	Apple TV+	co-production with Apple Studios, Walden Media, POV Entertainment, Dovetale Productions, Monarch Pictures and 3 Arts Entertainment
A Gentleman in Moscow	2024	Paramount+	co-production with Vanity Film & TV, Popcorn Storm Pictures, Moonriver Productions and Paramount Television International Studios
Queenie	2024	Channel 4	co-production with Further South Productions and Onyx Collective; Based on the novel of the same name by Candice Carty-Williams.
Side Quest	2025	Apple TV+	co-production with Nit Noi, RCG Productions, 3 Arts Entertainment and Ubisoft Film & Television
The Studio	2025–present	Apple TV+	co-production with Point Grey Pictures and Perfectly Pleasant Productions
The Hunting Wives	2025–present	Netflix	co-production with 3 Arts Entertainment; Based on the novel by May Cobb
The Rainmaker	2025–present	USA Network	co-production with Maniac Productions, Don't Tell Mom Productions, Wild Atlantic Pictures and Blumhouse Television
Robin Hood	2025–present	MGM+	co-production with Hidden Pictures
Spartacus: House of Ashur	2025–2026	Starz	co-production with DeKnight Productions and Tapert/Donen/Raimi
Private Eyes West Coast	2026	Global	co production with Piller/Segan and Corus Entertainment
The Interrogator	2027	FOX	co production with FOX Entertainment
Oldboy	TBA	TBA	
John Wick: The High Table	TBA	TBA	co-production with 87Eleven Entertainment and Thunder Road Films; Sequel to John Wick: Chapter 4
Untitled Nurse Jackie sequel series	TBA	Amazon Prime Video	co-production with Amazon MGM Studios

=== Debmar-Mercury ===
==== In-house shows ====
Title	Years	Network	Notes
Tyler Perry's House of Payne	2006–2012	TBS	co-production with Tyler Perry Studios
The Wendy Williams Show	2008–2022	Syndication	co-produced with Perler Productions and Just Wendy
Trivial Pursuit: America Plays	2008–2009	Syndication	co-production with Hasbro and Wheeler/Sussman Productions
Tyler Perry's Meet the Browns	2009–2011	TBS	co-production with Tyler Perry Studios; Co-distributed with Warner Bros. Television Distribution (via Turner Broadcasting System)
Are We There Yet?	2010–2013	TBS	co-production with Revolution Studios, 5914 Entertainment and Cube Vision
The Jeremy Kyle Show	2011–2013	Syndication	co-produced with and distributed outside of the United States by ITV Studios
Caught in Providence	2018–2020	Syndication	
Nick Cannon	2021–2022	Syndication	co-produced with NCredible Entertainment
Sherri	2022–2026	Syndication	

==== Third party distribution ====
Title	Years	Network	Notes
South Park	1997–present	Comedy Central	produced by Comedy Partners and South Park Studios; Syndicated by Debmar-Mercury from 2005 to 2015
Farscape	1999–2003	Sci-Fi Channel	American syndication rights produced by Hallmark Entertainment and The Jim Henson Company
Family Feud	1999–present	Syndication	produced by Fremantle North America previously distributed by Pearson Television from 1999 to 2001 and Tribune Entertainment from 2001 to 2007
American Chopper	2003–2010	Discovery Channel; TLC	Distributed under license by Discovery Communications for syndication
Deadliest Catch	2005–present	Discovery Channel	Distributed under license by Discovery Communications for syndication
Tosh.0	2009–2020	Comedy Central	produced by Black Heart Productions and Comedy Partners
Celebrity Name Game	2014–2017	Syndication	produced by Fremantle North America, Entertain the Burtes, Green Mountain West, Coquette Productions and CBS Television Studios
BoJack Horseman	2014–2020	Netflix	produced by Tornante Television, Boxer vs. Raptor and ShadowMachine
Schitt's Creek	2015–2020	CBC	produced by Not a Real Company Productions; American distribution under license from ITV Studios
The Conners	2018-2025	ABC	Worldwide distribution rights produced by Werner Entertainment, Jax Media and Mohawk Productions

=== Vestron Television ===
- Dirty Dancing (1988–89) (co-production with The Steve Tisch Company)

=== Trimark Pictures ===
- Thunder in Paradise (1994) (co-production with Berk/Schwartz/Bonann Productions and Rysher Entertainment)

=== Hearst Entertainment ===
Some King Features/Hearst Entertainment programs (primarily their animated series) are owned by Hearst Communications.

Title	Years	Network	Notes
Perspective on Greatness	1961–63	Syndication	
Ask Dr. Ruth	1986–88	Syndication	
Esquire: About Men for Women	1989–90	Lifetime	
Brewster Place	1990	ABC	co-production with Amanda Productions, The Don Sipes Organization, and Harpo Productions
Veronica Clare	1991	Lifetime	
Eerie, Indiana	1991–92	NBC	co-production with Unreality, Inc. and Cosgrove/Meurer Productions
What Happened?	1992–93	NBC	
Intimate Portrait	1993–2005	Lifetime	Some episodes only
Phantom 2040	1994–96	Syndication	American home entertainment rights
Portraits of Courage	1994–95	ESPN	
Essence of Life	1995–96	Syndication	
Rivals	1995–96	Discovery Channel	
Popular Mechanics for Kids	1997–2001	Syndication; Global	
Eerie, Indiana: The Other Dimension	1998	Fox Kids	
Famous Homes and Hideaways	2000–03	Syndication	
The Bravest	2001–02	Syndication	

=== Tribune Entertainment ===
Title	Years	Network	Notes
At the Movies	1982–90	Syndication	
What a Country!	1986–87	Syndication	co-production with Viacom Enterprises, Ripstar Productions and Primetime Entertainment
Geraldo	1987–98	Syndication	co-production with Investigative News Group
The Joan Rivers Show	1989–93	Syndication	co-production with PGHM Productions, Inc.
The Dennis Miller Show	1992	Syndication	
The Charles Perez Show	1994–96	Syndication	co-produced by Charles Dabney Perez Productions
Bzzz!	1996–97	Syndication	co-produced by Ralph Edwards/Stu Billet Productions
Out of the Blue	1996–97	Syndication	
Earth: Final Conflict	1997–2002	Syndication	American distributor; produced by Alliance Atlantis and Roddenberry/Kirschner Productions
Night Man	1997–99	Syndication	American distributor; produced by Alliance Atlantis, Village Roadshow Pictures and Crescent Entertainment
BeastMaster	1999–2002	Syndication	American distributor; produced by Alliance Atlantis and Coote/Hayes Productions
Andromeda	2000–05	Syndication/Sci-Fi; Global	American distributor; produced by Fireworks Entertainment and MBR Productions
Mutant X	2001–04	Syndication; Global	American distributor; produced by Fireworks Entertainment and Marvel Studios
Adventure Inc.	2002–03	Syndication	American distributor; produced by Fireworks Entertainment
Beyond with James Van Praagh	2002–03	Syndication	co-production with Fireworks Entertainment

==== Grant/Tribune Productions ====
Title	Years	Network	Notes
Sydney	1990	CBS	co-production with Oomp & Friends Productions and Gold Hat Entertainment

==== Golden West Television ====
Title	Years	Network	Notes
The Richard Simmons Show	1980–1984	Syndication	

=== Cuppa Coffee Studios ===
Lionsgate purchased the rights to five of Cuppa Coffee Studios' in-house productions on January 20, 2021.

Title	Years	Network	Notes
Bruno	2005	Noggin	interstitial series
Tigga and Togga	2006	TVOKids	interstitial series
Bruno and the Banana Bunch	2007–2008	Kids CBC	
Life's a Zoo	2008–2009	Teletoon	

== Lionsgate Alternative Television ==
Title	Years	Network	Notes
Scrabble	2024–present	The CW	co-production with Hasbro Entertainment and Mattel Television
Trivial Pursuit	2024–present	The CW	co-production with Hasbro Entertainment, Talpa Studios and LeVar Burton Entertainment
Martin Scorsese Presents: The Saints	2024	Fox Nation	co-production with Sikelia Productions, LBI Entertainment, Weimaraner Republic Pictures and Halcyon Studios
Death in Apartment 603: What Happened to Ellen Greenberg?	2025	Hulu	co-production with ABC News Studios, Lewellen Pictures and Tanbark Pictures

=== Creative Differences Productions ===
Formerly known as Termite Arts Productions.

- Amazing Science (1998)
- Too Extreme (1999)
- Incredible Vacation Videos (1999–2002)
- Speed Demons (1999)
- 30 Roller Coasters in 24 Hours? (2001)
- Amazing Animal Videos (2001–02)
- Amazing Baby Videos (2002–04)
- What Were You Thinking? (2002–04)
- Love University (2003)
- More than Human (2003–04)

=== Paperny Entertainment ===
Title	Original run	Network	Co-production with	Notes
BC Times	1997	Knowledge Network		
New Classics with Chef Rob Feenie	2000–2004	Food Network Canada		
KinK	2001–2006	Showcase		
Titans	2001	Global		
Singles	2002	Life Network		
Chasing the Cure	2002	Discovery Health Channel Canada		
Crash Test Mommy	2004–2008	Slice		
Spring	2004	HGTV Canada		
My Fabulous Gay Wedding	2005–2007	Global/Logo		
Road Hockey Rumble	2007–2008	OLN		
Glutton for Punishment	2007–2011	Food Network		
Jetstream	2008	Discovery Channel Canada		
The Week the Women Went	2008–2009	CBC		
The Stagers	2008–2010	HGTV		
Chop Shop	2009	Slice		
Combat School	2009	Discovery Channel Canada		
The 100 Mile Challenge	2009	Food Network Canada		
Eat St.	2011–2015	Food Network Canada		
Dust Up	2011	History Television	Prairie Threat Entertainment	
Consumed	2011–2013	HGTV Canada		
Dussault Inc.	2011–2012	Citytv/Bio.		
World's Weirdest Restaurants	2012–2013	Food Network Canada		Co-owned with Banijay
Yukon Gold	2013–2017	History Television		
Chopped Canada	2014–2017	Food Network Canada		
Timber Kings	2014–2017	HGTV Canada		
Cold Water Cowboys	2014–2017	Discovery Channel Canada		
Carver Kings	2015	HGTV Canada/Netflix	Shaw Media	

=== Force Four Entertainment ===
Title	Original run	Network	Co-production with	Notes
The Shopping Bags	2002–2008	W Network/Fine Living Network		
Human Cargo	2004	CBC		Miniseries.
Policewomen Files	2011	Oprah Winfrey Network Canada/Oxygen	Cineflix	
Urban Suburban	2011–2012	HGTV (Canada)		
Million Dollar Neighbourhood	2012–2013	Oprah Winfrey Network Canada		
Border Security: Canada's Front Line	2012–2014	National Geographic Channel (Canada)	Cineflix	
Seed	2013–2014	City		
Emergency	2015	Slice; Netflix	Shaw Media	
Keeping Canada Alive	2015	CBC		
Tricked	2016–2020	YTV; BYUtv	ITV Studios Global Entertainment	

=== Renegade 83 ===
Title	Years	Network	Notes
Blind Date	1999–2006; 2019–2020	Syndication; Bravo	co-production with Gold Coast Television Entertainment
The 5th Wheel	2001–2004	Syndication	co-production with Universal Television
Let's Make a Deal	2003	NBC	co-production with Monty Hall Enterprises, Inc.
The 4400	2004–2007	USA Network	co-production with American Zoetrope, BSkyB, Viacom Productions (season 1), Paramount Network Television (seasons 2–3) and CBS Paramount Network Television (season 4); Owned by Paramount Global Content Distribution
The Law Firm	2005	NBC	co-production with 20th Century Fox Television and David E. Kelley Productions
Miracle Workers	2006	ABC	co-production with DreamWorks Television
Gone Country	2008–2009	CMT	
Outsiders Inn	2008	CMT	
It's Effin' Science	2010	G4	
Man, Woman, Wild	2010–2012	Discovery Channel	
One Man Army	2011	Discovery Channel	
Excused	2011–2013	Syndication	co-production with CBS Television Distribution
Ready for Love	2013	NBC	co-production with UnbeliEVAble Entertainment and Universal Television; Owned by NBCUniversal Global Distribution
Naked and Afraid	2013–present	Discovery Channel	
Capture	2013	The CW	co-production with Blackbird Television and Warner Horizon Television
Famous in 12	2014	The CW	co-production with Harvey Levin Productions, Telepictures and Warner Horizon Television
Naked and Afraid XL	2015–2022	Discovery Channel	
First Impressions	2016	USA Network	co-production with GaspinMedia
You the Jury	2017	Fox	co-production with Ember Dot
Scared Famous	2017	VH1	co-production with GaspinMedia
Buried in the Backyard	2018–present	Oxygen	
Just Another Immigrant	2018	Showtime	co-production with Showtime Networks, Ranga Bee Productions and JSA Olive Oil
Sugar	2018	YouTube Premium	co-production with Big Kid Pictures, 222 Productions
The Pack	2020	Amazon Prime Video	co-production with Amazon Studios
Beyond the Edge	2022	CBS	
Snakes in the Grass	2022	USA Network	co-production with Red Shed Films
Naked and Afraid: Solo	2023–present	Discovery Channel	
Naked and Afraid: Castaways	2023–present	Discovery Channel	

=== Whizz Kid Entertainment ===
Title	Original run	Network	Co-production with	Notes
Janice & Abbey	2008	Living; Oxygen		
Let's Sing and Dance	2009–2017	BBC One		
Being... N-Dubz	2010–2011	4Music		
Talks Music	2013–2014	Sky Arts		
Ex on the Beach	2014–2023	MTV (UK and Ireland)		
BBQ Champ	2015	ITV	Country of Kings	
Lip Sync Battle UK	2016–2018	Channel 5		
De Férias com o Ex	2016–2021	MTV (Brazil)	Floresta Produções	
Prank Pad	2016	ITV2		
Ex on the Beach	2018–2023	MTV	Purveyors of Pop and MTV Entertainment Studios (season 5–)	

=== Daisybeck Studios ===
Title	Years	Network	Notes
The Yorkshire Vet	2015–present	Channel 5	
Springtime on the Farm	2018–present	Channel 5	
Made in Britain	2018–2021	ITV4	

== Starz ==
This includes in-house productions produced by Starz and its subsidiaries before the 2016 merger with Lionsgate and Starz's production/distribution assets being folded into Lionsgate Television.

Title	Years	Network	Notes
Head Case	2007–2009	Starz	
The Bronx Bunny Show	2007	Starz	
Hollywood Residential	2008	Starz	
Crash	2008–2009	Starz	
Party Down	2009–2010; 2023	Starz	
Gravity	2010	Starz	co-production with Kill That B**ch Productions
Spartacus	2010–2013	Starz	co-production with DeKnight Productions
Magic City	2012–2013	Starz	co-production with Media Talent Group and South Beach Productions
The White Queen	2013	Starz	
Black Sails	2014–2017	Starz	co-production with Platinum Dunes and Quaker Moving Pictures
Power	2014–2020	Starz	co-production with CBS Studios, End of Episode, Inc., Mawuli Productions, Atmosphere Television and G-Unit Films and Television Inc.
Survivor's Remorse	2014–2017	Starz	co-production with SpringHill Company, Werner Entertainment and O'Malley Ink
Blunt Talk	2015–2016	Starz	co-production with MRC, The Herring Wonder and Fuzzy Door Productions
Ash vs Evil Dead	2015–2018	Starz	co-production with Renaissance Pictures
Flesh and Bone	2015	Starz	co-production with Pelican Ballet and Bender Brown Productions
The White Princess	2017	Starz	
Sweetbitter	2018–2019	Starz	co-production with Sleeping Indian Inc. and Plan B Entertainment
Vida	2018–2020	Starz	co-production with Big Beach and Chingona Productions
Now Apocalypse	2019	Starz	
Leavenworth	2019	Starz	co-production with Mosquito Park Pictures, Check Point Productions and 765
Hightown	2020–2024	Starz	originally titled P-Town co-production with Jerry Bruckheimer Television
P-Valley	2020–2027	Starz	co-production with Chernin Entertainment and Kat Buggy Productions
Down in the Valley	2024	Starz	co-production with Zero Point Zero Production Inc.
Fat Joe Talks	2024	Starz	
Magic City: An American Fantasy	2025	Starz	

=== Starz Distribution ===
Title	Years	Network	Notes
Masters of Horror	2005–2007	Showtime	co-production with Industry Entertainment, Nice Guy Productions, and Reunion Pictures
Eloise: The Animated Series	2006	Starz Kids & Family	co-production with HandMade Films
Wow! Wow! Wubbzy!	2006–2010	Nickelodeon/Nick Jr. Starz Kids & Family	co-production with Bolder Media
Iron Kid	2007	The CW (Kids' WB)	produced under Manga Entertainment; English dub production for BRB Internacional
Hit the Floor	2013–2018	VH1	international distribution only; produced by The Film Syndicate and In Cahoots Media (Note: Currently owned by Paramount Global.)

== eOne Television ==
Title	Original run	Network	Co-production with	Notes
Trailer Park Boys	2001–07; 2014–18	Showcase (seasons 1–7); Netflix (seasons 8–12)	Trailer Park Productions (seasons 1–7); Topsail Entertainment (seasons 1–7); Showcase Television (seasons 1–7); Sunnyvale Productions (season 8–present); Swearnet Pictures (season 8–present)	Distributor from 2014 until early 2020s; currently distributed by Rollercoaster Entertainment
Sanctuary	2008–11	Syfy	The Beedie Group; My Plastic Badger (seasons 2–4); Bell Media (seasons 3 and 4); Sanctuary Productions (seasons 2–4)	Distributor
Hung	2009–11	HBO	Tennessee Wolf Pack; HBO Entertainment	
Majority Rules!	2009–10	Teletoon		
The Dating Guy	2010–11	Teletoon at Night	Marblemedia	
The Bridge	2010	CTV	990 Multi Media Entertainment Company; Jonsworth Productions	
Rookie Blue	2010–15	Global; ABC	Shaw Media; Thump, Inc. Canwest; Ilana C. Frank Films	
Haven	2010–15	Syfy; Showcase	Big Motion Pictures; Piller/Segan/Shepherd; Universal Networks International; Canwest (season 1); Shaw Media (seasons 2–5)	
Shattered	2010	Showcase; Global	Shaw Media; Force Four Films; Universal Networks International	
Call Me Fitz	2010–13	HBO Canada (seasons 1–3); Movie Central/The Movie Network (season 4)	Amaze Film & Television; Big Motion Pictures	
Men with Brooms	2010–11	CBC	Serendipity Point Films	
The Walking Dead	2010–22	AMC	Idiot Box Productions; Circle of Confusion; Skybound Entertainment; Valhalla Entertainment; AMC Studios	International distributor.
Skins	2011	MTV; The Movie Network/Movie Central	Company Pictures; The Movie Network; Movie Central; Storm Dog Films; MTV Production Development	
Almost Heroes	2011	Showcase		
Kenny Hotz's Triumph of the Will	2011	Action	Cineformia	
Hell on Wheels	2011–2016	AMC	Nomadic Pictures (Gayton)^{2} H.O.W. Productions; Endemol USA; Wirthwhile TV; AMC Studios	
The Firm	2012	Global; NBC	Sony Pictures Television; Paramount Pictures; Lukas Reiter Productions; AXN Original Productions; Shaw Media	
Undercover Boss Canada	2012–2013	W Network	Studio Lambert; Corus Entertainment	Produced by Alliance Films prior to 2013.
Mary Mary	2012–2017	We TV		
Saving Hope	2012–2017	CTV	Ilana C. Frank Films; Bell Media	
Primeval: New World	2012–2013	Space	Impossible Pictures; Omnifilm Entertainment	Distributor.
Rogue	2013–2017	Audience	Greenroom Entertainment; Momentum Pictures	
Compete to Eat	2013–2014	Cooking Channel	Antica; Blue Ant Media	
Bitten	2014–2016	Space	Hoodwink Entertainment; No Equal Entertainment; Bell Media	
Klondike	2014	Discovery Channel	Scott Free Productions; Discovery Channel; Nomadic Pictures	Miniseries.
From Dusk till Dawn: The Series	2014–2016	El Rey Network	Miramax; Sugarcane Entertainment; FactoryMade Ventures; Rodriguez International Pictures	Distributor.
Welcome to Sweden	2014–2015	TV4; NBC	Syskon; FLX	
Turn: Washington's Spies	2014–2017	AMC	Sesfonstein Productions; Josephson Entertainment; AMC Studios	International distributor.
Halt and Catch Fire	2014–2017	AMC	Gran Via Productions; Lockjaw; 320 Sycamore; AMC Studios	International distributor.
Matador	2014	El Rey Network	K/O Paper Products; Rodriguez International Pictures; FactoryMade Ventures	Distributor.
Tornado Hunters	2014–2015	CMT	Saloon Media	
Nellyville	2014	BET		
The Book of Negroes	2015	CBC	Conquering Lion Pictures; Out of Africa Entertainment	Miniseries.
Sports on Fire	2015	HBO Canada	Project 10 Productions; Two 4 The Money Media; Bell Media; Corus Entertainment	
Fameless	2015–2017	TruTV	Electus	
Fear the Walking Dead	2015–2023	AMC	Square Head Pictures; Circle of Confusion; Skybound Entertainment; Valhalla Entertainment; AMC Studios	International distributor.
Into the Badlands	2015–2019	AMC	Millar/Gough Ink; Big Kid Pictures; Diversion Pictures; Double Feature Films; AMC Studios	International distributor.
You Me Her	2016–2020	Audience; HBO Canada	JSS Entertainment; Alta Loma Entertainment	
Private Eyes	2016–2020	Global	Piller/Segan; Shaw Media (season 1); Corus Entertainment (seasons 2–4)	
Designated Survivor	2016–2019	ABC	Kinberg Genre; The Mark Gordon Company; Baer Bones; ABC Studios (seasons 1 and 2)	Distributor.
Ice	2016–2018	Audience	Fuqua Films	
Ransom	2017–2019	Global; TF1; CBS; VOX	Big Light Productions; Sienna Films; Wildcats Productions; Corus Entertainment	
Mary Kills People	2017–2019	Global	Corus Entertainment; Cameron Pictures Inc.	
Cardinal	2017–2020	CTV	Sienna Films	
The Manns	2017	TV One	Bobcat Films	
Burden of Truth	2018–2021	CBC	ICF Films; Eagle Vision	
Let's Get Physical	2018	Pop	Grandma's House Entertainment; Rosey TV	
Death Row Chronicles	2018	BET	Creature Films	
Caught	2018	CBC	Take the Shot Productions	
The Detail	2018	CTV	ICF Films	
America Says	2018–2022	Game Show Network	Keller/Noll; Game Show Enterprises	
We're the Campbells	2018	TV One	My Block Inc.	
Sharp Objects	2018	HBO	Crazyrose; Fourth Born; Blumhouse Television; Tiny Pyro	Miniseries.
LadyGang	2018	E!	Purveyors of Pop	
Trailer Park Boys: The Animated Series	2019–2020	Netflix	Sunnyvale Productions; Swearnet Pictures	
Ladies Night	2019	BET	BET	
Love & Listings	2019–2020	VH1	Purveyors of Pop; Creature Films; Relive Entertainment	
Deputy	2020	Fox	Carcharodon Films; Cedar Park Entertainment; XOF Productions	
Nurses	2020–2021	Global	ICF Films	
Run	2020	HBO	DryWrite; Wild Swim	
Candy Land	2020	Food Network	Super Delicious	
Project Bakeover	2021–2022	Food Network		
Arctic Vets	2021–2022	CBC		
Cruel Summer	2021–2023	Freeform	Iron Ocean Productions	
Moonshine	2021–2023	CBC	Six Eleven Media	
Play-Doh Squished	2021–2023	Amazon Freevee	Amazon Studios	
Not So Pretty	2022	HBO Max	Jane Doe Films	
Red Rose	2022	BBC Three; Netflix	Eleven	
The Rookie: Feds	2022–2023	ABC	ABC Signature, Perfectman Pictures	
The Spencer Sisters	2023	CTV	Buffalo Gal	

=== Gaylord Production Company ===
Title	Original run	Network	Co-production with	Notes
Faerie Tale Theatre	1982–1987	Showtime	Platypus Productions; Lion's Gate Films	
Explore	1984	PBS	Southern Cross Productions	
Tall Tales & Legends	1985–1987	Showtime	Platypus Productions	
The Adventures of the Galaxy Rangers	1986	Syndication	Transcom Media; ITF Enterprises	
Casey Kasem's Rock 'n' Roll Goldmine	1986–1987	Syndication	Four Point Entertainment	

=== Barna-Alper Productions ===
Title	Original run	Network	Co-production with	Notes
Turning Points of History	1997–2005	History Television	Connections Productions; Alliance Atlantis	
Da Vinci's Inquest	1998–2005	CBC	Haddock Entertainment; Alliance Atlantis; Program Partners	
Frontiers of Construction	1999–2004	Discovery Channel Canada	Ragged Earth Productions	
Blue Murder	2001–2004	Global	North Bend Films; Alliance Atlantis	
Show Me Yours	2004–2005	Showcase		
G-Spot	2005–2006; 2009	The Movie Network	Serendipity Point Films	
Mega Builders	2005–2010	Discovery Channel		
Da Vinci's City Hall	2005–2006	CBC	Haddock Entertainment; Program Partners	
Underworld Histories	2006–2009	History Television	Underworld Gangs; Outright Distribution	
Party Mamas	2007–2012	We TV	Party Mamas Productions; Alliance Atlantis	
Da Kink in My Hair	2007–2009	Global	Defiant Entertainment	
Who Do You Think You Are?	2007–2008	CBC		

=== Blueprint Entertainment ===
Title	Original run	Network	Co-production with	Notes
Hey Joel	2003	VH1	Curious Pictures	
Kenny vs. Spenny	2003–2010	Showcase; CBC	Breakthrough Entertainment	
The Wrong Coast	2004	The Movie Network	Contractual Obligations Productions; Cuppa Coffee Studios; Curious Pictures	
Shoebox Zoo	2004–2005	BBC One	BBC Scotland; Alberta Filmworks	
Noah's Arc	2005–2006	Logo		
Whistler	2006–2008	CTV	Boardwatch Productions	
'Til Death Do Us Part	2007	Court TV/Global		
The Best Years	2007–2009	Global/E!		
Iggy Arbuckle	2007	Teletoon; Jetix	C.O.R.E. National Geographic Kids; NGC Studios	
Exes and Ohs	2007–2009	Logo; Showcase		
Testees	2008	FX; Showcase		

=== The Mark Gordon Company ===
Title	Original run	Network	Co-production with	Notes
LAX	2004–2005	NBC	NBC Studios; Nick Thiel Productions	
Army Wives	2007–2013	Lifetime	ABC Studios	
Reaper	2007–2009	The CW	Dark Baby Productions; ABC Studios; Fazekas & Butters	
Private Practice	2007–2013	ABC	Shondaland; ABC Studios	
Criminal Minds: Suspect Behavior	2011	CBS	CBS Television Studios; ABC Studios; Bernero Productions	
Family Tools	2013	ABC	ITV Studios America, ABC Studios	
Ray Donovan	2013–20	Showtime	Ann Biderman Co; Bider Sweet Productions; David Hollander Productions; Showtime Networks	
Benched	2014	USA Network	ABC Signature	
Quantico	2015–2018	ABC	Random Acts Productions (seasons 1 and 2); Maniac Productions (season 3); ABC Studios	
Criminal Minds: Beyond Borders	2016–2017	CBS	CBS Television Studios; ABC Studios; Erica Messer Productions	
Conviction	2016–2017	ABC	Double Fried Productions; ABC Studios	
Youth & Consequences	2018	YouTube Red		

=== Alliance Atlantis Communications ===
eOne owns the copyrights and Canadian distribution rights to the Alliance Atlantis library, as a result of its acquisition of Alliance Films in 2012. Distribution outside of Canada is handled by SP Releasing and FilmRise, while most children's programs are owned by WildBrain (except in Europe, where Studio 100 holds the rights).

Title	Original run	Network	Co-production with	Notes
This Hour Has 22 Minutes	1993–present	CBC		Continued from Salter Street Films; Alliance produced season twelve (rights sold to Halifax Film/DHX Media in 2005); Currently owned and produced by IoM Media Ventures.
Due South	1994–1999	CTV; CBS; Syndication		Continued from Alliance Communications
The Outer Limits	1995–2002	Showtime; Global	MGM Television; Trilogy Entertainment Group	Continued from Atlantis Communications
Traders	1996–2000	Global		Continued from Atlantis
Psi Factor	1996–2000	Global; Syndication	Eyemark Entertainment	Continued from Atlantis
NightMan	1997–1999	Syndication	Tribune Entertainment; Village Roadshow Pictures; Glen Larson Entertainment	Continued from Atlantis
Earth: Final Conflict	1997–2002	Syndication	Tribune Entertainment; Roddenberry-Kirschner Productions	Continued from Atlantis
Cold Squad	1998–2005	CTV	Keatley-MacLeod Productions	Continued from Atlantis
Welcome to Paradox	1998	Showcase; Sci-Fi Channel		
The Crow: Stairway to Heaven	1998–1999	Syndication	PolyGram Television; Crescent Entertainment	
Da Vinci's Inquest	1998–2005	CBC	Haddock Entertainment; Barna-Alper Productions	
Power Play	1998–1999	CTV; UPN	Serendipity Point Films; N.D.G Productions	
Little Men	1998–1999	CTV; PAX TV		
Shadow Raiders	1998–1999	YTV	Mainframe Entertainment	
Nothing Too Good for a Cowboy	1998–2000	CBC	Milestone Productions	
Total Recall 2070	1999	Syndication; Showtime	PolyGram Television; WIC Entertainment; TEAM Communications Group	
Amazon	1999–2000	Syndication	Eyemark Entertainment; BetaFilm	
BeastMaster	1999–2002	Syndication	Tribune Entertainment; Coote-Hayes Productions	
Drop the Beat	2000–2001	CBC	Back Alley Film Productions	
Starhunter	2000–2004	The Movie Network		Alliance produces the first season
2gether: The Series	2000–2001	MTV	Gunn & Gunn Productions	
CSI: Crime Scene Investigation	2000–2015	CBS	Jerry Bruckheimer Television; CBS Productions	Currently owned by Paramount Global
Blue Murder	2001-2004	Global	North Bend Films; Barna-Alper Productions	
Sail Away	2001	Discovery Kids		
The Associates	2001–2002	CTV		
CSI: Miami	2002–2012	CBS	Jerry Bruckheimer Television; CBS Productions	Currently owned by Paramount Global
The Eleventh Hour	2002–2005	CTV		
CSI: NY	2004–2013	CBS	Jerry Bruckheimer Television; CBS Productions	Currently owned by Paramount Global

==== Alliance Communications ====
Title	Original run	Network	Co-production with	Notes
Night Heat	1985–1989	CTV (Canada); CBS (US)	Grosso-Jacobson Productions	
Mount Royal	1988	CTV		
Bordertown	1989–1991	CTV		
E.N.G.	1989–1994	CTV		
Counterstrike	1990–1993	USA Network	Grosso-Jacobson Productions	
The Adventures of the Black Stallion	1990–1993	The Family Channel (US); YTV (Canada); M6 (France)	Atlantique Productions	
North of 60	1992–1997	CBC		
ReBoot	1994–2001	YTV	Mainframe Entertainment; BLT Productions	Alliance produced the first two seasons Currently owned by Kartoon Studios, with Shout! Studios handling digital, streaming and home media distribution rights
Taking the Falls	1995–1996	CTV		
Beast Wars: Transformers	1996–1999	Syndication; YTV	Claster Television; Hasbro; Mainframe Entertainment	Currently owned by Hasbro Entertainment and WildBrain
Once a Thief	1997–1998	CTV		
Fast Track	1997–1998	The Movie Network; Showtime		
Sins of the City	1998	USA Network	Chesler/Perlmutter Productions	

==== Atlantis Communications ====
Title	Original run	Network	Co-production with	Notes
The Ray Bradbury Theater	1985–1992	First Choice/Superchannel; HBO; USA Network		
Airwaves	1986–1987	CBC		
Airwolf	1987	USA Network	MCA TV	Co-production for season 4
The Twilight Zone	1988-1989	Syndication	CBS Broadcast International; London Films; MGM/UA Telecommunications	Co-production for season 3
Ramona	1988–1989	CHCH-DT	Ramona Productions	
Mom P.I.	1990–1992	CBC		
Neon Rider	1990–1995	CTV; YTV	Virue/Rekert Productions	
Destiny Ridge	1993–1995	Global	Great North Communications	
TekWar	1994–1996	CTV; USA Network	Universal Television; WIC Entertainment	
Flash Forward	1995–1997	Disney Channel; ABC	Walt Disney Television	
Married Life	1995	The Movie Network; Comedy Central		
The Adventures of Sinbad	1996–1998	Global; Syndication	All American Television	

==== Salter Street Films ====
Title	Original run	Network	Co-production with	Notes
CODCO	1988–1993	CBC		
Flightpath	1996–2001	Discovery Channel		
Lexx	1997–2002	Space; Citytv		
Made in Canada	1998–2003	CBC	Island Edge	
Skullduggery	2000	The Comedy Network		
These Arms of Mine	2000–2001	CBC	Forefront Entertainment	

==== Fireworks Entertainment ====
Alliance Atlantis purchased the Canadian distribution rights to the Fireworks Entertainment TV library in 2005. This library is distributed outside Canada by Quiver Distribution.

Title	Original run	Network	Co-production with	Notes
RoboCop: The Series	1994	CTV	Rigel Entertainment; Rysher Entertainment	
F/X: The Series	1996–1998	CTV	Rysher Entertainment	
Highlander: The Raven	1998–1999	Syndication	Rysher Entertainment; Gaumont Television	
Relic Hunter	1999–2002	Syndication	Rysher Entertainment; Paramount Domestic Television; Gaumont Television	
Queen of Swords	2000–2001	Global	Paramount Domestic Television; Morena Films	
Andromeda	2000–2005	Global; Syndication; Sci-Fi Channel	Tribune Entertainment; MBR Productions	
Mutant X	2001–2004	Global; Syndication	Tribune Entertainment; Marvel Studios	
Strange Days at Blake Holsey High	2002–2006	Global; Discovery Kids		
Adventure Inc.	2002–2003	Global; Syndication	Tribune Entertainment	
Zoe Busiek: Wild Card	2003–2005	Global; Lifetime		

==== Telescene ====
Title	Original run	Network	Co-production with	Notes
Urban Angel	1991–1993	CBC		
The Hunger	1997–2000	The Movie Network; Showtime	Scott Free Productions	
Student Bodies	1997–2000	YTV; Global; Syndication	20th Television	
The Lost World	1999–2002	Syndication	St. Clare Entertainment; New Line Television	

==== Vidatron/Peace Arch Entertainment ====
Title	Original run	Network	Co-production with	Notes
Dead Man's Gun	1997–1999	Showtime		Distributed in the U.S. by MGM Television
First Wave	1998–2001	Space; Sci-Fi Channel	American Zoetrope; Sugar Entertainment	Distributed outside of Canada by Fremantle

== Television films & specials ==
=== Lions Gate Television Pictures ===
Title	Airdate	Network	Notes
Superfire	April 20, 2002	ABC	Nominated for the Primetime Emmy Award for Outstanding Special Visual Effects for a Miniseries, Movie or a Special.

=== Lionsgate Television ===
Title	Airdate	Network	Notes
Dirty Dancing	May 24, 2017	ABC	co-production with Allison Shearmur Productions

==== Artisan Television ====
Title	Airdate	Network	Notes
RFK	August 25, 2002	FX	co-production for Fox Television Studios
Return to the Batcave: The Misadventures of Adam and Burt	March 9, 2003	CBS	co-production with The Kaufman Company and DC Entertainment for Fox Television Studios

===== Family Home Entertainment =====
Title	Airdate	Network	Notes
A Cricket in Times Square	April 27, 1973	ABC	distribution; produced by Chuck Jones Enterprises
A Very Merry Cricket	December 14, 1973	ABC	distribution; produced by Chuck Jones Enterprises
The Bear Who Slept Through Christmas	December 17, 1973	NBC	distribution; produced by DePatie-Freleng Enterprises
Rikki-Tikki-Tavi	January 9, 1975	CBS	distribution; produced by Chuck Jones Enterprises
Yankee Doodle Cricket	January 16, 1975	ABC	distribution; produced by Chuck Jones Enterprises
The White Seal	March 24, 1975	CBS	distribution; produced by Chuck Jones Enterprises
Mowgli's Brothers	February 11, 1976	CBS	distribution; produced by Chuck Jones Enterprises
The Great Bear Scare	1983	Syndication	distribution; produced by DimenMark International

==== Hearst Entertainment ====
Title	Airdate	Network	Notes
Wildflower	December 3, 1991	Lifetime	co-production with Freed-Laufer Productions, Carroll Newman Productions and The Polone Company
Baby Snatcher	May 3, 1992	CBS	co-production with Morgan Hill Films
Smithsonian Expedition: The Elephants of Timbuktu	May 29, 1994	A&E	
Smithsonian Expedition: Treehouse People, Cannibal Justice	July 10, 1994	A&E	
Dancing in the Dark	July 6, 1995	Lifetime	produced by Dream City Films and Power Pictures
Smithsonian Expedition: Source of the Mekong	December 26, 1997	A&E	
Custody of the Heart	August 28, 2000	Lifetime	co-production with Daniel L. Paulson Productions
Crossing the Line	July 15, 2002	Lifetime	co-production with BEI Losing It Productions Inc., Medeacom Productions, and Robert Kline Productions
Wicked Minds	March 28, 2005	Lifetime	produced in 2002; co-production with Incendo Media and JB Media

===== King Phoenix Entertainment =====
Formerly known as Phoenix Entertainment Group from 1985 to 1988.

Title	Airdate	Network	Co-production with
A Time to Triumph	January 7, 1986	CBS	Billos/Kauffman Productions
Child's Cry	February 9, 1986	CBS	Shoot the Moon Enterprises
Thompson's Last Run	February 16, 1986	CBS	Cypress Point Productions
The Brotherhood of Justice	May 18, 1986	ABC	Sandyhook Productions and The Steve Tisch Company
Doing Life	September 23, 1986	NBC	
Her Secret Life	April 12, 1987	ABC	
A Hobo's Christmas	December 6, 1987	CBS	
Evil in Clear River	January 11, 1988	ABC	Star Track Company
A Father's Revenge	January 24, 1988	ABC	Shadowplay/Roscoe
God Bless the Child	March 21, 1988	ABC	Alliance Entertainment, IndieProd Company Productions
A Whisper Kills	May 16, 1988	ABC	Margot Winchester Productions, Taper Media Enterprises, and Guber-Peters Entertainment Company
Nightmare at Bittercreek	May 24, 1988	CBS	
Street of Dreams	October 7, 1988	CBS	
Goddess of Love	November 20, 1988	NBC	
Finish Line	January 11, 1989	TNT	The Guber-Peters Company
Get Smart, Again!	February 26, 1989	ABC	IndieProd Company Productions
The Women of Brewster Place	March 19–20, 1989	ABC	Harpo Productions

==== Tribune Entertainment ====
Title	Airdate	Network	Notes
Scared Straight!	November 2, 1978	Syndication	produced by Golden West Television
Voyage of Terror: The Achille Lauro Affair	April 29, 1990	Syndication	
Final Shot: The Hank Gathers Story	March 29, 1992	Syndication	

==== eOne Television ====
===== Gaylord Production Company =====
Title	Original run	Network	Co-production with	Notes
To Catch a King	February 12, 1984	HBO	Entertainment Partners	
Children in the Crossfire	December 3, 1984	NBC	Schaefer/Karpf Productions	
Stone Pillow	November 5, 1985	CBS	Schaefer/Karpf Productions	
Mrs. Delafield Wants to Marry	March 30, 1986	CBS	Schaefer/Karpf Productions	
Nobody's Child	April 6, 1986	CBS	Schaefer/Karpf Productions	
Six Against the Rock	May 18, 1987	NBC	Schaefer/Karpf/Eckstein Productions	
Laura Lansing Slept Here	March 7, 1988	NBC	Schaefer/Karpf/Eckstein Productions	
Bonanza: The Next Generation	March 23, 1988	CBS	Bonanza Ventures	

===== Alliance Atlantis Communications =====
Title	Original run	Network	Co-production with	Notes
Family of Cops 3	January 12, 1999	CBS	The Cramer Company; Joel Blasberg Company	
Joan of Arc	May 16–18, 1999	CBC; CBS		
Life with Judy Garland: Me and My Shadows	February 25–26, 2001	ABC	In-Motion; Storyline Entertainment	
The Matthew Shepard Story	March 16, 2002	NBC; CTV		
Hell on Heels: The Battle of Mary Kay	October 6, 2002	CBS		
Hitler: The Rise of Evil	May 16, 2003	CBS		

====== Alliance Communications ======
Title	Original run	Network	Co-production with	Notes
Overdrawn at the Memory Bank	September 22, 1984	CBC; PBS	WNET	As RSL Entertainment
Woman on the Run: The Lawrencia Bembenek Story	May 16–17, 1993	NBC	NBC Productions	
Family of Cops	November 26, 1995	CBS	The Cramer Company; Joel Blasberg Company	
Breach of Faith: A Family of Cops 2	February 2, 1997	CBS	The Cramer Company; Joel Blasberg Company	

====== Atlantis Communications ======
Title	Original run	Network	Co-production with	Notes
Miracle at Moreaux	December 2, 1985	PBS		
Really Weird Tales	1986	HBO	Viacom Productions	
A Child's Christmas in Wales	1987	Global; PBS		
Glory! Glory!	February 19, 1989	HBO	Orion Television; The Greif-Dore Company	
Where the Spirit Lives	October 29, 1989	CBC; PBS		
Clarence	November 24, 1990	The Family Channel	International Family Entertainment; NorthStar Entertainment Group; South Pacific Pictures	
Christmas in America	1990	NBC	King World Productions; The Guber-Peters Company; Kenny Rogers-Barris Inc.	Rights owned by Paramount Global outside Canada
The Diviners	January 3, 1993	CBC		
Heads	January 29, 1994	Showtime	Credo Group Limited	
Avalanche	November 1, 1994	CTV; Fox		
Following Her Heart	November 28, 1994	NBC	Roni Weisberg Productions; Ann Margret Productions	
Harrison Bergeron	August 13, 1995	Showtime		
Night of the Twisters	February 11, 1996	The Family Channel	MTM Enterprises; International Family Entertainment; PorchLight Entertainment	Rights owned by The Walt Disney Company

====== Salter Street Films ======
Title	Original run	Network	Co-production with	Notes
Life with Billy	November 7, 1993	CBC	The Film Works	
The Bookfair Murders	April 9, 2000	CTV	Triptych Media; Second Wave Productions	
Blessed Stranger: After Flight 111	October 17, 2000	CTV	Big Motion Pictures	
Chasing Cain	March 2001	CBC	Muse Entertainment	
Tagged: The Jonathan Wamback Story	March 11, 2002	CTV	Tapestry Pictures	
Chasing Cain II: Face	2002	CBC	Muse Entertainment	
Shattered City: The Halifax Explosion	October 26, 2003	CBC	Tapestry Pictures	

====== Norstar Entertainment ======
Title	Original run	Network	Co-production with	Notes
Spenser: For Hire: Ceremony	July 22, 1993	ABC	Broadwalk Entertainment	Rights owned by The Walt Disney Company
Spenser: For Hire: Pale Kings and Princes	January 2, 1994	ABC	Broadwalk Entertainment; Capital Cites/ABC Video Enterprises	Rights owned by The Walt Disney Company
Spenser: For Hire: A Savage Place	1995	ABC	Broadwalk Entertainment; Protocol Entertainment; ABC Cable & International Broadcast Inc.	Rights owned by The Walt Disney Company
The Arrow	1997	CBC	Tapestry Pictures; The Film Works	

=== Lionsgate Alternative Television ===
==== Whizz Kid Entertainment ====
- Elton's New Year Party: Live at the O2 (2008)
- The Road to Wembley (2015)
- The Lodge Live (2015) (co-production with Disney Branded Television)
- Hugh Grant: A Life on Screen (2019)

==== Daisybeck Studios ====
- The Naked Village (2014)
