= Glutton for Punishment (TV program) =

- Genre: Food reality television
- Created by: Bob Blumer; Aynsley Vogel
- Presented by: Bob Blumer
- Country of origin: Canada
- Original language: English
- No. of seasons: 5
- No. of episodes: 59

Production
- Running time: 30 minutes
- Production company: Paperny Films

Original release
- Network: Food Network
- Release: 10 July 2007 – 14 February 2011

Glutton for Punishment is a discontinued 2007–2011 television program on Food Network hosted by Bob Blumer and produced by Paperny Entertainment. The show features the host competing in various daunting, food-related challenges. He is given five days to become proficient enough in the episode's featured specialty, then his newly acquired skills are put to the test by matching him up against champions and experts in the field. In several competitions, Bob Blumer surprises by qualifying ahead of many pros—and he sometimes even wins. When he is not doing so well, he acknowledges the difficulty he has, often with self-deprecating humour.

== World record stunt ==
The show features Blumer breaking the Guinness world record for the largest bowl of salsa at the Jacksonville, Texas, 26th Tomato Fest on June 12, 2010. The final bowl weighed in at 2,672 pounds. The feat was filmed for Season 5 of "Glutton", during which Bob attempted to break six world's records.

== Episodes ==
=== Season 1 ===
#	Title:	Description:
01	"NYC Waiters' Race"	Blumer waits tables at a busy brasserie in New York City
02	"Flair bartending"	Blumer trains in the art of flair bartending
03	"Médoc Marathon"	Blumer participates in the Médoc Marathon in France's Bordeaux region
04	"Oyster Shuck-Off"	Blumer learns the technique of oyster shucking and travels to the Urbanna Oyster Festival in Virginia to enter the Oyster Shucking Competition
05	"Benihana Chef"	Blumer trains to become a full-fledged teppanyaki chef at Toronto's Benihana restaurant
06	"Barista Competition"	Blumer enters the Canadian National Barista Championships
07	"Hatch chile Festival"	Blumer enters the Hatch, New Mexico, hot chile eating contest
08	"Tour de France"	Blumer trains with a veteran of the Tour de France and attempts to conquer one of the most challenging sections of the Tour
09	"Kansas City BBQ Competition"	Blumer leads his own team in the Open Competition at a Kansas City BBQ Cookoff
10	"Riesling Harvest"	Blumer assists in the harvest of 17 acres (69,000 m^{2}) of grapes for a maker of fine German Riesling wines
11	"Guinness Diet"	Blumer travels to Dublin, where tries to live on Guinness alone for five full days
12	"Noodle Pulling"	Blumer tries to master the lost art of making hand-pulled noodles
13	"Breakfast Line Cook"	Blumer works as a breakfast line cook

=== Season 2 ===
#	Title:	Description:
01	"Haggis Hurling"	Blumer's travels to Scotland to try haggis hurling
02	"Honey Bee"	Blumer travels to Oregon to learn the art of beekeeping; at the end of the week, he has to show what he enters the Beekeepers Games
03	"Cheese Rolling"	Blumer's travels to Gloucester, England, to compete in the Cooper's Hill Cheese-Rolling and Wake competition
04	"Okie Noodling"	Blumer's travels to Oklahoma to catch catfish with his bare hands
05	"Fried Egg/Sidewalk Chef"	Blumer's travels to the Mojave Desert where he has 15 minutes to cook an egg using only solar power
06	"Garlic Braiding"	Blumer goes to Arleux, France, "garlic capital of the world", to enter in a garlic-braiding contest
07	"Watermelon Seed Spitting"	Blumer's travels to Hope, Arkansas, and challenges past champions at spitting watermelon seeds on the back of a flatbed truck
08	"New York Street Vendor"	Blumer takes over a food cart business at a busy New York City intersection for a 12-hour shift
09	"Pike's Market"	Blumer takes part in tossing salmon with the fishmongers at Pike Place Fish Market in Seattle, Washington
10	"Pumpkin Regatta"	Blumer takes part in a race to paddle a hollowed-out, giant pumpkin across a lake
11	"Corn Husking"	Blumer heads to Dell Rapids, South Dakota, to compete against America's best cornhuskers at the National Cornhusking Competition
12	"Perfect Steak"	Blumer's tries to learn how to cook the perfect steak, then become the head grill master at Bohanan's Prime Steaks & Seafood in San Antonio, Texas
13	"Fugu (Fish)"	Blumer travels to Osaka, Japan, to prepare and eat his own fugu

=== Season 3 ===
#	Title:	Description:
01	"Guinness Book of Records"	At the Calgary Stampede in Calgary, Alberta, Blumer tries to break the Guinness World Record for the most pancakes made in one hour
02	"One-Man Band"	In Paris, Blumer tries to run an entire 16-seat restaurant by himself
03	"Lobster Banding"	At the Pictou County Lobster Carnival in Pictou, Nova Scotia, Blumer competes the Lobster Banding Contest
04	"World Pizza Cup"	In Naples, Blumer competes for the title of World's Best Pizza-Tosser
05	"Morel Mushrooms"	In a burnt forest in northern British Columbia, Blumer competes to pick the heaviest load of morel mushrooms
06	"Deep Fried Competition"	At the L.A. County Fair, Blumer competes in the Fair's Deep Fry Contest
07	"Sea Urchins"	On Vancouver Island, Blumer competes in a sea urchin harvesting race
08	"Hot Sauce Judging"	At the Austin Hot Sauce Festival in Austin, Texas, Blumer becomes one of the official judges
09	"Pie Baking"	Blumer competes in the Shelburne Orchard's Annual Apple Pie Baking contest in Vermont
10	"Pasta Cook"	Blumer works on the line on a busy Friday night at the Mia Francesca restaurant in Chicago
11	"Grape Stomp"	At the Sonoma County Harvest Fair in Santa Rosa, California, Blumer competes in the World Grape Stomp
12	"Coffee Picking"	In Kona, Hawaii, Blumer competes in the annual Coffee Picking Contest
13	"Navy Head Cook"	Blumer works in the galley of a Navy ship

=== Season 4 ===
#	Title:	Description:	Air Date:
01	"Kung-Fu Tea Challenge"	Blumer's tries to master a special Kung-fu tea ceremony and then perform it for a tough panel of judges at the Tai Ji Tea House in Hangzhou, China	January 18, 2010
02	"Nettle Eating"	Blumer participates in the Stinging Nettle Eating Competition in Dorset, England	January 4, 2010
03	"Sushi Masters"	Blumer goes head-to-head against a seasoned group of sushi chefs in the Sushi Masters Competition in San Diego	February 1, 2010
04	"Goat Milking"	Blumer competes at the Mason-Dixon Fair's goat milking competition in Delta, Pennsylvania	January 11, 2010
05	"Slice and Dice"	Blumer competes against culinary professionals in a Knife Skills Competition at Kendall Culinary College in Chicago	February 8, 2010
06	"Ice Cream Making"	At the Austin Ice Cream Festival, Blumer competes in the homemade ice cream making contest	January 25, 2010
07	"Potato Peeling"	Blumer strives to be the fastest at the annual Potato Days Peeling Contest in Barnesville, Minnesota	February 22, 2010
08	"Chinese Dumpling"	Blumer goes head-to-head against dim sum pros in a dumpling making competition at the Night Market in Richmond, BC	March 1, 2010
09	"Bagel Roll-off"	Blumer takes part in a challenge to hand-roll 44 perfect bagels in five minutes at the St-Viateur Bagel Bakery in Montreal	February 15, 2010
10	"Coconut Husking"	Blumer competes in the 13th Annual Coconut Festival in Kapaa, Hawaii	March 8, 2010
11	"Gumbo Cook-off"	Blumer participates in the Gumbo cook-off in New Iberia, Louisiana	March 22, 2010
12	"Edible Car"	Blumer is pitted against elite engineering students in the Edible Car Competition at Brown University in Rhode Island	March 15, 2010
13	"Chocolate Fashion Show"	Blumer enters his unique wearable chocolate creation into a Chocolate Hat Fashion Show in the Salon Passion Chocolat & de la Gourmandise in Montreal	March 29, 2010

=== Season 5 (Record-Breaking Edition) ===
Bob attempts to break Guinness World Records.

#	Title:	Location:	Guinness World Record Attempt:	Air Date:
01	"Pizza Making Record"	Toronto	Most 12-inch pizzas stretched, sauced, cheesed and fired in one hour	January 3, 2011
02	"Rice Eating Record"	Taipei	Most rice grains eaten one by one with chopsticks in 3 minutes	January 10, 2011
03	"Largest Bowl of Salsa"	Jacksonville, Texas	Largest bowl of salsa	January 17, 2011
04	"Egg Cracking Record"	Granby, Quebec	Most eggs cracked with one hand in one hour	January 24, 2011
05	"Caesar Salad Record"	Yuma, Arizona	Most table-side Caesar salads made in one hour	January 31, 2011
06	"Onion Peeling Record"	Walla Walla, Washington	Fastest time to peel 50 pounds of onions	February 14, 2011
07	"The Best Of"	n/a	Highlights from the previous five seasons	February 14, 2011
