= Bear 71 =

2012 Canadian web documentary

- Directed by: Leanne Allison, Jeremy Mendes
- Written by: J.B. MacKinnon
- Narrated by: Mia Kirshner
- Release date: 2012
- Running time: 20 minutes
- Country: Canada
- Language: English
- Budget: $350,000

Bear 71 is a 20-minute 2012 interactive National Film Board of Canada (NFB) web documentary by Leanne Allison and Jeremy Mendes about a female grizzly bear in Banff National Park named Bear 71, who had a tracking collar implanted at the age of three and was watched via trail cameras in the park from 2001 to 2009. The documentary follows the bear, exploring the connections between the human and animal world, and the far-ranging effects that human settlements, roads and railways have on wildlife.

== Production ==
Through the work of Leanne Allison's husband and film collaborator Karston Heuer (Being Caribou, Finding Farley), a park ranger at Banff, Allison was aware of thousands of hours of wildlife footage captured on remote trail cameras in the park. After obtaining permission from researchers, including Parks Canada, Alberta Tourism, Parks and Recreation, and Montana State University, she spent months sifting through these low-res images. Allison originally pitched the idea to the NFB as a traditional documentary. Rob McLaughlin, then head of the NFB's digital studio in Vancouver, suggested an interactive project.

The story was written by J.B. MacKinnon, co-author of the 100 Mile Diet. The bear is voiced by Mia Kirshner. The two co-directors were remote workers: Allison was based in Canmore, Alberta and Mendes was based in Vancouver. The website was designed by Toronto-based digital design firm Jam3.

The film had a budget of $350,000.

== Release ==
Bear 71 went live on the NFB website on January 19, 2012. It was also the subject of an installation art exhibit at the 2012 Sundance Film Festival's New Frontier program beginning January 20, and at the Utah Museum of Contemporary Art or via webcam through the documentary's website. The webdoc features a map of Banff National Park that allows users to follow Bear 71's movements by scrolling over the cameras, and look at other users by activating the computer's webcam.

In April 2012, DOXA Documentary Film Festival opened its 2012 season with a public showing of the film at St. Andrew's-Wesley United Church, with a live musical accompaniment by Tim Hecker, Loscil, and Heather McIntosh.

In March 2017, the film was re-released as a virtual reality work, viewable on Google Daydream and Google Cardboard.

== Awards ==
In June 2012, Jam3 received a Gold Cyber Lion Award the Cannes Lions International Advertising Festival in the category of Charities, Public Health & Safety and Public Awareness Messages, for its work on Bear 71.

Also in June 2012, Sheffield Doc/Fest awarded Bear 71 the Sheffield Innovation Award sponsored by BT Vision.

In December 2012, Bear 71 was named the best non-fiction web series at the Digi Awards (formerly Canadian New Media Awards).

On January 15, 2013, Bear 71 was named Site of the Year for 2012 by the Favourite Website Awards.

On April 30, 2013, Bear 71 received the Webby Award for best internet art.

The film also received Webby nominations for best public service & activism video, best use of interactive video and best green website.

== See also ==
- Bear JJ1
- Bears and Man, a 1978 NFB documentary on human-bear interaction
- List of individual bears
