= Matthew Finlason =

Jamaican-Canadian designer and art director

- Born: Matthew Enos Finlason; March 29, 1975 (age 51); Mandeville, Jamaica
- Occupations: Television personality; designer; art director; producer
- Website: Official site

Matthew Finlason (born March 29, 1975, in Mandeville, Jamaica) is a designer, art director, and producer of film and television projects. He is the host of HGTV's television series The Stagers.

== Career ==
Finlason worked as a landscape designer while pursuing his Bachelor of Arts from York University in Canada. Upon graduation from York University in June 1999 he worked as a performer on-camera appearing in minor roles on television and film while also working for his family's real-estate business. He subsequently moved behind the camera in film and television art departments as an assistant and then as a set decorator, art director and production designer, before starting work at Dekora, a Canadian home staging company.

Finlason was soon approached by Paperny Films to host an HGTV production called The Stagers. Through his profile on this show, he appeared as a home staging design and real estate expert in the New York Times and the Canadian press. He has appeared on entertainment talk shows including Entertainment Tonight Canada, Urban Rush and Breakfast Television, as well as the Scripps Network's HGTV Showdown, a televised design competition, in which he was paired with Olympic gold medalist and celebrity amateur designer Kristy Yamaguchi.

Finlason has worked with and designed sets for Scott Smith and Gregory Middleton on Capturing George, a short film commemorating George F. Walker's Governor General's Awards; and Cameron Labine's feature film Control ALT Delete.

== Television ==
=== The Stagers ===
The Stagers is a half-hour reality television show about home staging that airs on HGTV in the U.S. and Canada. It is produced by Paperny Films and stars Finlason alongside Bridget Savereux and Maureen Powers.

The Stagers has received four Leo Awards, including an award for Finlason as "Best Host in a Lifestyle Series".

| List of Episodes Featuring Finlason | Episode Airdate |
| Season 1 | |
|---|---|
| 1. A Whole New World | 1 July 2008 |
| 2. The Fox and the Hound | 8 July 2008 |
| 3. House Under Siege | 15 July 2008 |
| 4. Fish Bowl in the Sky | 22 July 2008 |
| 5. The Bachelor Pad | 12 August 2008 |
| 6. Lofty Ambitions | 19 August 2008 |
| 7. Them's Fightin' Words | 9 September 2008 |
| 8. The Suburban Stage | 23 September 2008 |
| 9. The Penthouse | 23 September 2008 |
| Season 2 | |
| 10. The Frame Job | 1 April 2009 |
| 11. Quest for Fire | 15 April 2009 |
| 12. Pillar Talk | 29 April 2009 |
| 13. Bringing It Home | 6 May 2009 |
| 14. Dazzling a Designer | 13 May 2009 |
| 15. Child's Play | 27 May 2009 |
| 16. The Awkward Stage | 10 June 2009 |
| 17. Spec House SOS | 24 June 2009 |

=== HGTV Showdown ===
HGTV Showdown is a half-hour reality television show that pits designers and carpenters against each other in various design challenges. In each episode, two design teams compete on stage to make over a room for a couple whose decorating styles differ. Starting with staged replicas of the room, the design teams are given four hours to complete the redesign. Finlason was paired with Olympic gold medalist Kristi Yamaguchi in an episode entitled Bonus Room Blitz.

== Awards ==
- "Best Host" in a "Lifestyle Series" - The Stagers - The Fox and the Hound (2009)
