= Dishwasher salmon =

Method of cooking fish

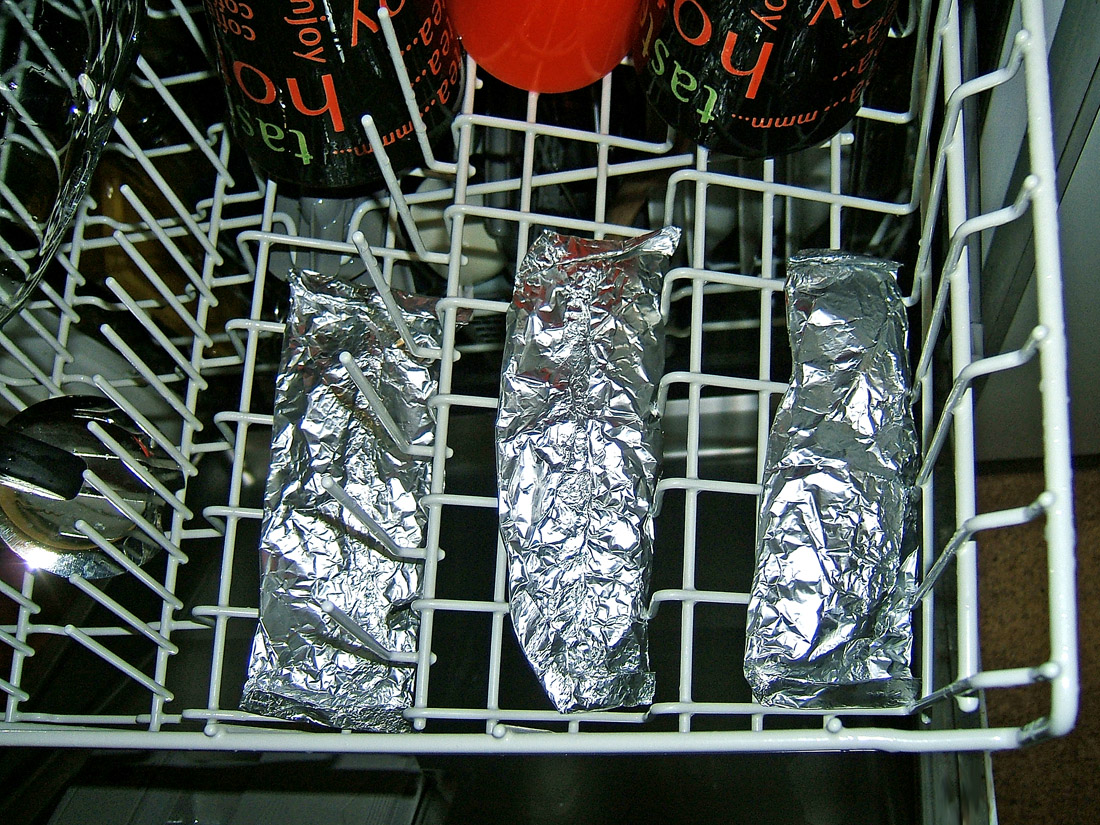
Salmon fillets wrapped in aluminum foil and placed on a dishwasher rack

Dishwasher salmon is a fish dish made by a cooking technique where salmon is wrapped in aluminum foil and placed in a dishwasher for a full cycle. Dishwasher companies and Consumer Reports have identified potential issues, including inconsistent temperatures and the risk of food poisoning.

== Safety concerns ==
Dishwasher companies and the independent product-testing organization Consumer Reports have recommended against cooking fish with a dishwasher for several reasons. They are not designed or tested for cooking, dishwashers do not have temperatures as consistent as stoves, and it is questionable whether dishwashers will heat fish sufficiently to kill pathogens. Eating fish cooked in a dishwasher may result in food poisoning.

== Preparation ==
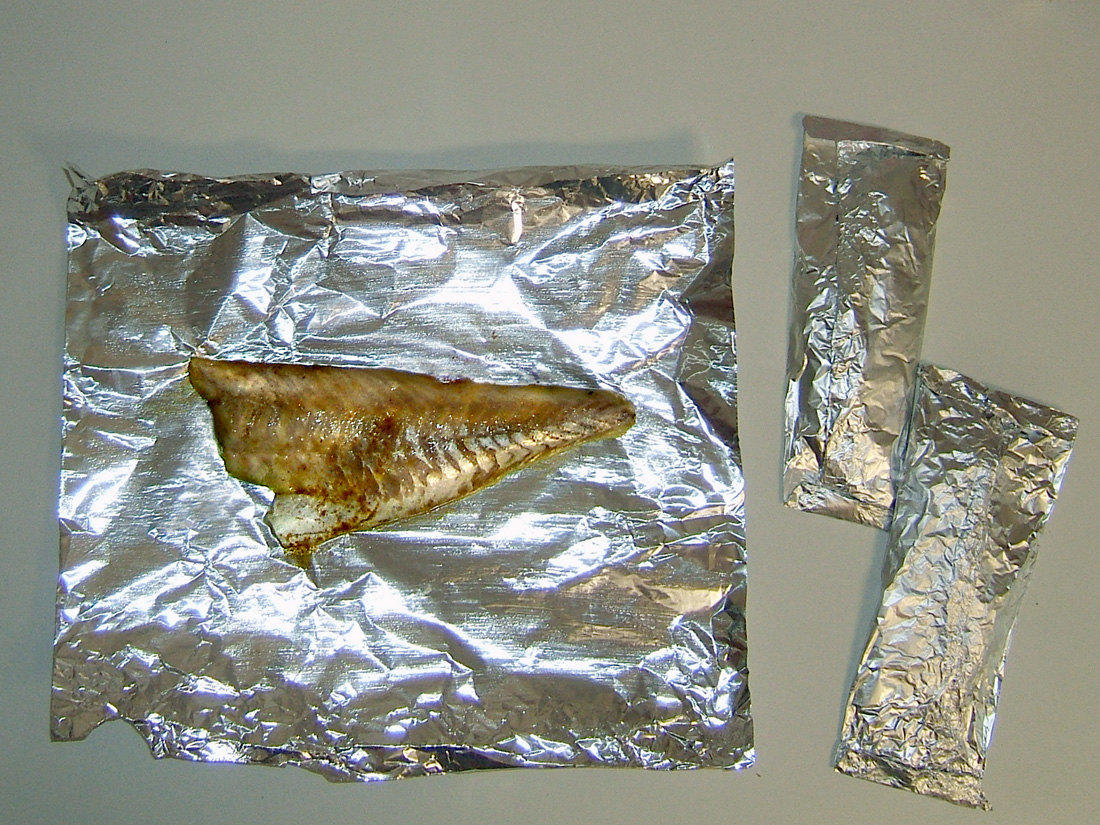
Cooked dishwasher salmon

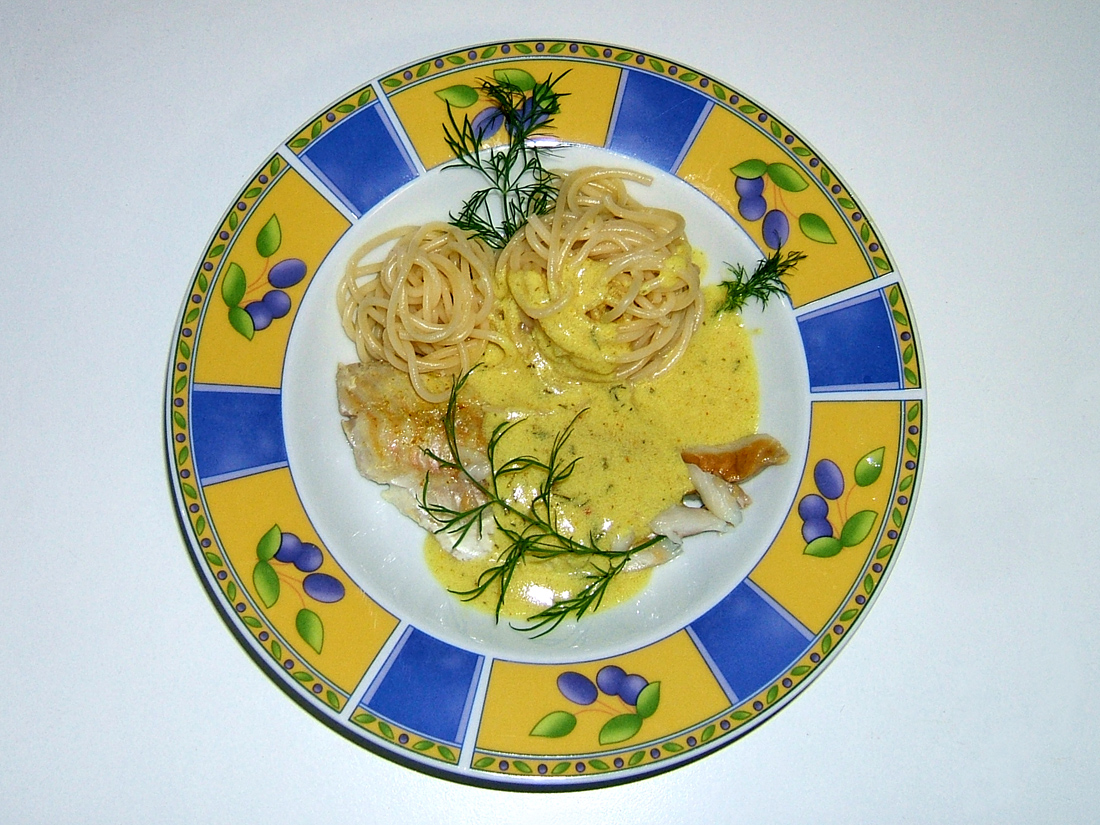
Served with spaghetti

Pieces of salmon are spiced and wrapped tightly in at least two layers of aluminum foil and put in a dishwasher. The dishwasher is set to perform a full regular cycle, possibly with the addition of a heated dry cycle. The salmon is broiled, steamed, and baked. An advantage of the method is that cooking is odorless. There is nothing preventing one from washing the dishes at the same time, provided that the package is tight enough.

== History ==
Vincent Price demonstrated how to prepare a trout in a dishwasher on The Tonight Show with Johnny Carson in 1975. Price presented it as "a dish any fool can prepare". The Canadian cooking program The Surreal Gourmet, hosted by Bob Blumer, also featured the preparation of this dish in 2002. The Wall Street Journal, MSNBC, BBC, Vogue, and Choice have all published reports about the dish and CBS News interviewed Kym Douglas about the book The Black Book of Hollywood Diet Secrets where the dish is presented. Tom Scott, who made a video on the preparation of the dish in 2009, noted that his dishwasher salmon was "perfect".
