= The Surreal Gourmet =

Canadian cooking show

The Surreal Gourmet is a Canadian cooking program on Food Network, hosted by Bob Blumer.

The show features creative techniques for cooking and the Toastermobile. Generally, the foods prepared on The Surreal Gourmet are intended to be served at parties or other get-togethers.

Past episodes included "Salmon in the Dishwasher", "Claw and Disorder", and "When You Fish Upon a Car". Cookbooks related to the series include The Surreal Gourmet: Real Food For Pretend Chefs (1992), The Surreal Gourmet Entertains: High-Fun, Low-Stress Dinner Parties for 6 to 12 People (1995), and Off the Eaten Path: Inspired Recipes for Adventurous Cooks (2000).
