= J. B. MacKinnon =

Canadian journalist, contributing editor and book author

James Bernard MacKinnon
- Other names: J. B. MacKinnon
- Occupations: journalist, contributing editor, author
- Awards: National Magazine Award (6×); Charles Taylor Prize

James Bernard MacKinnon, commonly cited as J.B. MacKinnon, is a Canadian journalist, contributing editor and book author. MacKinnon is best known for co-authoring with Alisa Smith the bestselling book The 100-Mile Diet: A Year of Local Eating, encouraging readers to focus on local eating as a way to address current environmental and economic issues. MacKinnon and Smith also collaborated in the creation of the Food Network Canada television series The 100 Mile Challenge, based on the book. He has won six National Magazine Awards, and the 2006 Charles Taylor Prize for best work of Literary Non-Fiction.

As a contributing editor to Canadian magazines Adbusters, Explore, and Vancouver, and freelance journalist, MacKinnon's writings span many literary genres and topics, including travel, sports, and politics. MacKinnon's first book, Dead Man in Paradise, combines family history and unsolved mystery in the retelling of the murder of MacKinnon's uncle, a Canadian priest, in 1965 in the Dominican Republic. It won the Charles Taylor Prize. In 2008, MacKinnon co-authored I Live Here with Mia Kirshner, Michael Simons, and Paul Shoebridge, a collection of stories about victims of crisis throughout the globe. In 2011, he wrote the script for the interactive web documentary Bear 71, which premiered at the Sundance Film Festival. MacKinnon lives in Vancouver, British Columbia.

In 2021 he published The Day the World Stops Shopping: How ending consumerism gives us a better life and a greener world.
