= James Cunningham (comedian) =

Canadian stand-up comedian and TV host

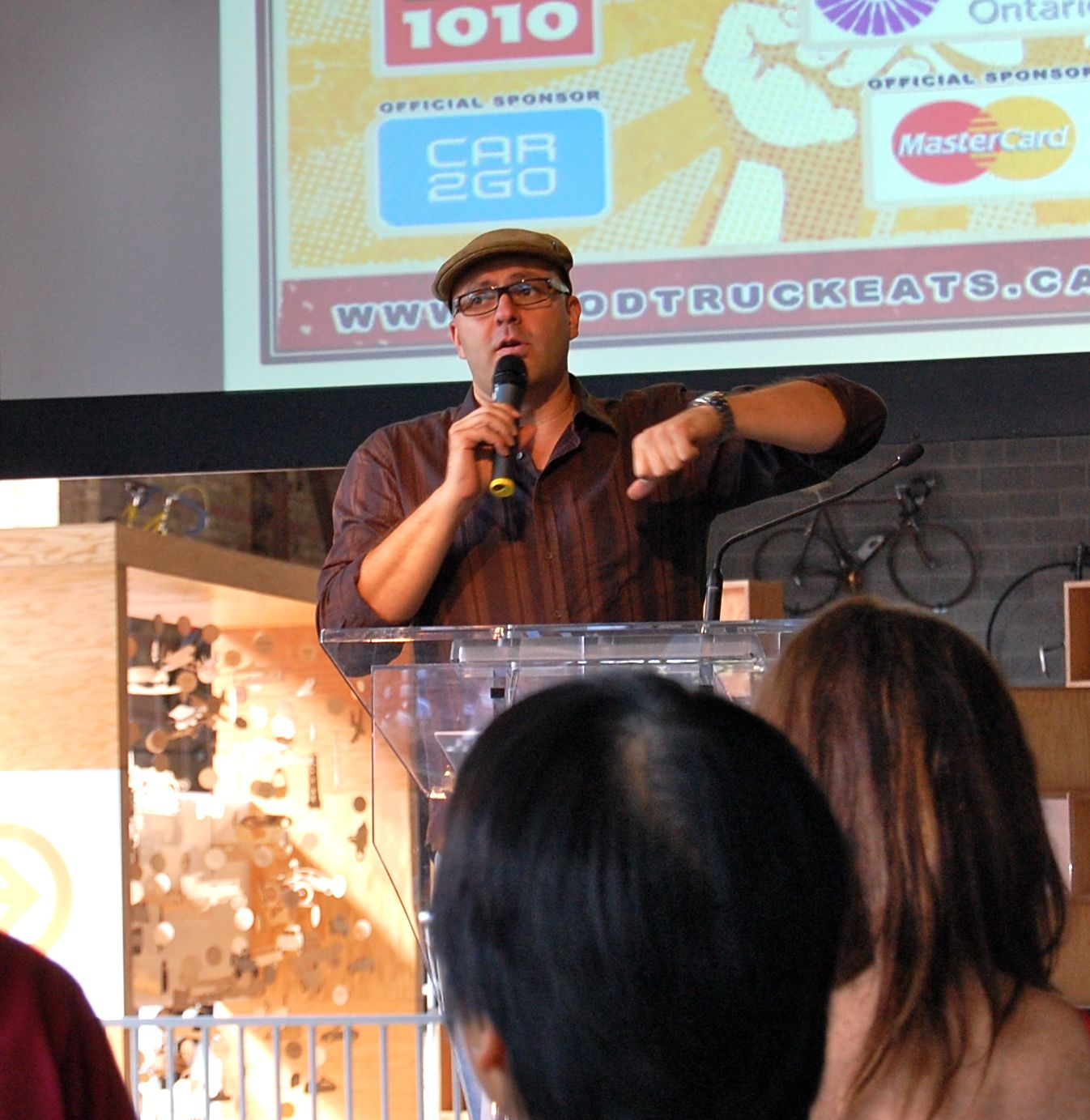
- Cunningham in September 2012

James Cunningham (born 1973 or 1974) is a Canadian stand-up comedian and TV host.

He is the host of Food Network Canada's and Cooking Channel US's Eat St., a TV show about North American street food that debuted in 2011. He initially auditioned for another show before being offered the job of hosting Eat St. Other television appearances include "Last Comic Standing" and "Just for Laughs." He has also worked as a TV warm up act.

He wrote and hosts "Funny Money", a stage show designed to teach students about finance. He does over 300 stand-up performances a year, mostly "Funny Money".

Cunningham was born in Toronto, where his father was an accountant. He studied drama and minored in finance at the University of Toronto.
