= Jetstream (TV series) =

- Country of origin: Canada
- Original language: English
- No. of seasons: 1
- No. of episodes: 8

Production
- Executive producers: David Paperny; Cal Shumiatcher
- Producer: Karen Melvin
- Running time: 50 minutes

Original release
- Network: Discovery Channel Canada
- Release: January 8 – February 26, 2008

Jetstream is a 2008 documentary television series produced by Paperny Films for the network Discovery Channel Canada. The series totals 8 episodes and premiered on January 8, 2008. The series was narrated by Canadian actor Kavan Smith.

== Pilots ==
Seven of the eight pilots are graduates of the Royal Military College of Canada:

- 21810 Capt. Michael (Mike) "Floater" M.R. Lewis (RMC ‘00)
- 21955 Capt. Riel "Guns" K. Erickson (RMC ‘01);
- 22537 Capt. Yannick "Blow" Jobin (RMC ‘03);
- 22542 Capt. Tristan "T-bag" Mckee (RMC ‘03);
- 22715 Capt. Timothy (Tim) "Nail'n" B. Coffin (RMC ‘03);
- 22821 Lt. Dave "Tickler" McLeod (RMC ‘04);
- 22848 Capt. Shamus "Carney" T. Allen (RMC ‘04)

The series was released on DVD in 2008.

== Synopsis ==
Jetstream follows eight pilots training with the Royal Canadian Air Force to fly one of the most advanced supersonic tactical fighter jets in the world—the CF-18 Hornet at CFB Cold Lake, Alberta. They train under the 410 Tactical Fighter Training Squadron.

== Episodes ==
No.	Title	Original release date
1	"The Rookies"	January 8, 2008
2	"Members Only"	January 15, 2008
3	"Blood on the Page"	January 22, 2008
4	"Darkness Falls"	January 29, 2008
5	"Fight's On"	February 5, 2008
6	"Dream Killer"	February 12, 2008
7	"Do or Die"	February 19, 2008
8	"Bomb's Away"	February 26, 2008

== Home release ==
Jetstream was released on DVD in 2008. The DVD box set includes all eight episodes of the series, over 20 minutes of bonus footage, and a preview for the TV series Combat School.
