= Kavan Smith =

Canadian actor (born 1970)

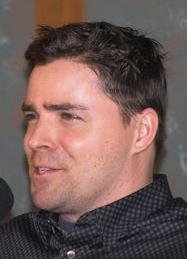
- Born: Kavan Joel Smith; May 6, 1970 (age 56); Edmonton, Alberta, Canada
- Occupation: Actor
- Years active: 1993–present
- Spouse: Corinne Clark

Kavan Joel Smith (born May 6, 1970) is a Canadian actor known for playing Major Evan Lorne in Stargate Atlantis and Stargate SG-1, as Agent Jed Garrity in The 4400, and as Leland Coulter in When Calls the Heart.

== Early life and career ==
Born in Edmonton, Alberta, Smith was raised by his father after his parents divorced. He attended the University of Calgary for a year and a half and then enrolled in the performing arts program at Mount Royal University. He began his acting career with a leading role in Destiny Ridge in 1993. In Stargate: Atlantis, Smith appeared in 29 episodes as the recurring character Major Evan Lorne. He also appeared in two episodes of Stargate SG-1 (the episodes "Enemy Mine" in Season 7 and "The Road Not Taken" in Season 10) as Major Lorne.

He has also guest-starred in numerous television shows including Supernatural, Smallville, Sanctuary, Tru Calling, Battlestar Galactica, Outer Limits, Human Target, and The Twilight Zone. He had a recurring role as the android Deputy Andy on Syfy's Eureka. Smith co-starred with Felicia Day in the 2012 SyFy film adaptation Red: Werewolf Hunter, which tells the modern dark story of Red Riding Hood. He also had a starring role in SyFy movie Metal Shifters in 2010.

In addition to acting, Kavan has also narrated the Canadian-made documentaries Combat School and Jetstream.

== Filmography ==
=== Film ===
Year	Title	Role	Notes
2000	Mission to Mars	Nicholas Willis	
2001	See Spot Run	Ricky	
2002	Stark Raving Mad	Michael Frakes	

=== Television ===
Year	Title	Role	Notes
1993	Destiny Ridge	Clay Roberts	TV series
1995	The Other Mother: A Moment of Truth Movie	Chris	TV film (NBC)
1995	The Annette Funicello Story	Young Dick Clark	TV film (CBS)
1995	Mixed Blessings	Tommy	TV film (NBC)
1995	The Outer Limits	Quarterback	"Caught In The Act"
1996	Generation X	Lance	TV film (Fox)
1996	The Sentinel	Quinn	"True Crime"
1996	Titanic	5th Officer Harold Lowe	TV miniseries
1996	The Outer Limits	Harrison Taylor	"Straight and Narrow"
1997	Alibi	Cliff	TV film (ABC)
1997	Intensity	Jack Templeton	TV film (Fox)
1998	The Outer Limits	Lt. O'Neill	"Criminal Nature"
1998	First Wave	Tommy Cranston	"Marker 262"
1999	The Crow: Stairway to Heaven	Frank Moran	"Disclosure"
1999	Escape from Mars	Sergei Andropov	TV film (UPN)
1999	Dead Man's Gun	Mr. Smith	"A Just Reward"
1999	Fearless	Reese Godell	TV film
2000	Hope Island	Peter Gibson	"Never Burn Your Tongue on the Admiral's Broth"
2000	The Outer Limits	Dominic Langton	"Stasis"
2001	The Outer Limits	Allan	"Flower Child"
2001	Big Sound	Devin	"The Power of Rock and Roll"
2001	Night Visions	Dante	"Reunion"
2002	Smallville	Wade Mahoney	"Kinetic"
2002	Living with the Dead	Matt	TV film (CBS)
2002	Due East	Stephen Dugan	TV film (Showtime)
2003	The Twilight Zone	Matthew Forsenth	"Developing"
2003	A Date with Darkness: The Trial and Capture of Andrew Luster	Anthony Wold	TV film (Lifetime)
2003	Jeremiah	Vincent	"Deus Ex Machina"
2003	Stargate SG-1	Major Evan Lorne	"Enemy Mine"
2004	Eve's Christmas	Neil Barlow	TV film
2005	Miss Texas	Cowboy Eric	TV film
2005	Killer Instinct	Jonas Mentzel	"13 Going on 30"
2005	Reunion	Dr. David King	"1993"
2005–2006	Godiva's	Zach	Recurring role
2005–2007	The 4400	Jed Garrity	Recurring role (21 episodes)
2005–2009	Stargate Atlantis	Major Evan Lorne	Recurring role (29 episodes)
2006	Battlestar Galactica	Lt. Richard 'Buster' Baier	"The Captain's Hand"
2006	The Time Tunnel	Flynn	TV film
2006	Blade: The Series	Alex	"Turn of the Screw"
2007	Stargate SG-1	Major Evan Lorne	"The Road Not Taken"
2008	Nightmare at the End of the Hall	Brett	TV film (Lifetime)
2008	Sanctuary	Det. Joe Kavanaugh	"Sanctuary for All: Part 1", "Edward"
2009	The Guard	Joe	"Love Sick"
2010	Human Target	Nathan	"Victoria"
2010	Growing the Big One	Seth	TV film (Hallmark)
2010	Shattered	Gordon Banner	"Don't Wanna Die"
2010	Red: Werewolf Hunter	Nathan Kessler	TV film (Syfy)
2010	The Cult	Simon	TV film (CBC)
2010–2012	Eureka	Deputy Andy	Recurring role (21 episodes)
2011	Iron Golem	Jake	TV film (Syfy)
2011	The Killing Game	Mark	TV film (Lifetime)
2012	Fairly Legal	Jesse	"Start Me Up"
2013	Almost Human	A.D.A. Ortega	"Blood Brothers"
2013–2014	Rogue	Tom Travis	Main role
2014	Baby Bootcamp	Scott	TV film
2014	Garage Sale Mystery: All That Glitters	Alan Bernard / Derrick Brooks	TV film (Hallmark Movies & Mysteries)
2014–2020	Supernatural	Cuthbert Sinclair	"Blade Runners", "The Werther Project", "Last Holiday" "Time is on my side" (Gym Club Victim, s3 e15)
2015	Motive	Keith Carson	"Calling the Shots"
2015	Mistresses	Ellis	Recurring role (4 episodes)
2015	Hello, It's Me	James	TV film (Hallmark)
2015–present	When Calls the Heart	Leland Coulter	Regular Role
2016	Wedding Bells	Nick Turner	TV film (Hallmark)
2016	The Irresistible Blueberry Farm	Hayden Croft	TV film (Hallmark Movies & Mysteries)
2016	Dirk Gently's Holistic Detective Agency	Nathan	"Horizons", "Lost & Found"
2017	The Perfect Bride	Nick Dyson	TV film (Hallmark)
2018	The Perfect Bride: Wedding Bells	Nick Dyson	TV film (Hallmark)
2019	Love on the Menu	Hank	TV film (Hallmark)
2021	You Had Me at Aloha	Ben	TV film (Hallmark)
2022	Big Sky River	Boone Taylor	TV film (Hallmark Movies & Mysteries)
2023	Big Sky River: The Bridal Path	Boone Taylor	TV film (Hallmark Movies & Mysteries)
2023	Notes of Autumn	Jack	TV film (Hallmark Movies & Mysteries)
2024	Nelly Knows Mysteries: A Fatal Engagement	Michael Hogan	TV film (Hallmark Movies & Mysteries)
2026	Nelly Knows Mysteries: All Manners of Murder	Michael Hogan	TV film (Hallmark Movies & Mysteries)
