= World's Weirdest Restaurants =

- Genre: Food reality television
- Starring: Bob Blumer
- Composer: Daniel Ross
- Country of origin: Canada
- Original language: English
- No. of seasons: 2
- No. of episodes: 28

Production
- Executive producers: David Paperny; Cal Shumiatcher; Audrey Mehler
- Cinematography: Simon Schneider
- Running time: 30 minutes
- Production company: Paperny Entertainment

Original release
- Network: Food Network Canada
- Release: April 4, 2012

World's Weirdest Restaurants is a Canadian reality television series produced by Paperny Entertainment that airs on Food Network Canada. The series follows host Bob Blumer as he travels the world searching for weird and unusual restaurants. Several of the Japan episodes featured TV host and arranger La Carmina, who wrote a book about bizarre Tokyo theme restaurants. Among the restaurants featured include a nudist restaurant in New York, a Japanese restaurant with monkey waiters, Colorado's Casa Bonita, and Taiwanese restaurant which serves curry from miniature toilets. The series, which premiered April 4, 2012, has filmed in a number of cities around the world, including Tokyo, New York, Taipei, London and Vancouver.
