= KinK =

Canadian television documentary series

KinK is a Canadian documentary television series that first aired in 2001 on Showcase. The series profiled some of the more unusual edges of human sexuality, primarily the kink and fetish scenes. It was filmed in Montreal, Toronto, Vancouver and Winnipeg; the fifth season, set in Halifax, Nova Scotia, first aired in September 2006. KinK was produced by Vancouver's Paperny Films.

The series' official website and home video releases are no longer available after Paperny Entertainment's parent company Entertainment One was acquired by Hasbro in December 2019.

== Concept ==
This series highlights different people's real-life kinks, as defined by the person being observed. Each episode takes an in-depth look at the lifestyles of two or three people (or couples), and how their kink affects their life. Each season of the show follows these couples as they learn and progress through the lifestyle.

== Seasons ==
- 2001 13 x 30 min (Showcase)
- 2002 13 x 30 min (Showcase)
- 2003 13 x 30 min (Showcase)
- 2005 11 x 30 min (Showcase)
- 2006 13 x 30 min (Showcase)

== See also ==
- BDSM
- Bondage
- Cross-dressing
- Polyamory
- Restraints
- Sadomasochism
- Sexual fetishism
- Sexual roleplay
- Transgender
- Transsexualism
- Transvestism
