= Consumed (TV series) =

Canadian reality television series

- Genre: reality television
- Created by: Aynsley Vogel
- Directed by: Brad Quenville
- Starring: Jill Pollack
- Composers: John Sereda; Paul Michael Thomas
- Country of origin: Canada
- Original language: English
- No. of seasons: 2
- No. of episodes: 22

Production
- Executive producers: David Paperny; Cal Shumiatcher; Audrey Mehler
- Cinematography: Todd Craddock
- Editor: Rafi Spivak
- Running time: 60 minutes

Original release
- Network: HGTV (Canada)
- Release: August 30, 2011 – September 10, 2013

Consumed is a Canadian reality television series produced by Paperny Entertainment that airs on HGTV Canada. The series stars de-cluttering expert Jill Pollack, who challenges families overwhelmed by their possessions to survive for 30 days with only the bare essentials. After the 30 days are over the families must decide which possession they truly need and which to donate. The series, which films largely in the Metro Vancouver area, premiered on August 30, 2011. The second season premiered on June 8, 2013.
