= Dust Up =

- Title card
- Genre: Reality television
- Narrated by: Scott McNeil
- Composer: Jay Semko
- Country of origin: Canada
- Original language: English
- No. of seasons: 1
- No. of episodes: 6

Production
- Executive producers: David Paperny; Cal Shumiatcher; Audrey Mehler; Terry Mialkowsky; Shannon Jardine; Ed Hatton
- Producer: Trevor Hodgson
- Production locations: Nipawin, Saskatchewan
- Cinematography: Shawn Viens
- Running time: 30 minutes
- Production company: Paperny Entertainment

Original release
- Network: History Television
- Release: June 2 – June 16, 2011

Dust Up was a Canadian reality television series produced by Paperny Entertainment and Prairie Threat Entertainment that aired in 2011 on History Television. The series follows three crop dusters in Nipawin, Saskatchewan (73-year-old Bud Jardine, his son Brennan Jardine, and rookie pilot Travis Karle) as they compete for work and mount sometimes-perilous crop dusting expeditions. Each plane is outfitted with four cameras to capture the action.
