= Eat St. =

- Genre: Reality Television
- Directed by: Peter Waal
- Starring: James Cunningham
- Composer: Adam Lastiwka
- Country of origin: Canada
- Original language: English
- No. of seasons: 3
- No. of episodes: 94

Production
- Executive producers: David Paperny; Cal Shumiatcher; Audrey Mehler; Peter Waal
- Producers: Trevor Hodgson; David Freeman; Cal Shumiatcher
- Cinematography: Shane Geddes
- Running time: 30 minutes
- Production company: Paperny Entertainment

Original release
- Network: Food Network Canada
- Release: April 6, 2011 – March 24, 2015

Eat St. is a Canadian reality television series produced by Paperny Entertainment that airs on Food Network Canada and Cooking Channel. It is hosted by Canadian comedian James Cunningham tours North American food trucks. To accompany the series, an Eat St. app was developed that uses GPS to track street fare near the user. The series, which premiered April 6, 2011, has filmed in Vancouver, Calgary, Toronto, and a number of cities in the United States.

== Mobile app ==
An Eat St. app for the iPhone was released in 2011, which allows users to discover food trucks in their area and share tips and photos with others. It also includes video clips and recipes from vendors that have appeared on the show.

== Broadcast ==
In the United States, the series airs on Cooking Channel. An episode which aired on January 27, 2015 rated 78,000 viewers. An episode on February 3, 2015 was watched by 62,000 viewers.
