= The 100-Mile Diet =

Book by Alisa Smith and J.B. MacKinnon

The 100 Mile Diet: A Year of Local Eating
- First edition cover of Canadian release
- Author: Alisa Smith and J.B. MacKinnon
- Subject: Diet (nutrition)
- Genre: Non-fiction, memoir
- Published: March 2007 (Random House)
- Publication place: Canada
- Media type: Print (Hardcover & Paperback)
- Pages: 272 pp.
- ISBN: 0-679-31482-2
- OCLC: 74028846

The 100-Mile Diet: A Year of Local Eating (or Plenty: One Man, One Woman, and a Raucous Year of Eating Locally) is a non-fiction book written by Canadian writers Alisa Smith and J.B. MacKinnon. In the book, the authors recount their experiences, including motivations and challenges, on restricting their diet, for one year, to include only foods grown within 100 miles of their residence. Beginning in March 2005, with little preparation the urban couple began only purchasing foods with ingredients they knew were all from within 100 miles. Finding little in grocery stores, they relied on farmers' markets and visits to local farms. Staples in their diet included seafood, chicken, root vegetable, berries, and corn. They lacked cooking oils, rice, and sugar. They preserved foods for use in the winter but ended with extra supplies.

The couple first wrote about the experience in articles for the online magazine The Tyee. The popularity of the articles led to a book deal. In the book, Smith and MacKinnon each write alternate chapters, 12 in total. The first chapter is written by MacKinnon and focuses on the first month of their experience. They write in the first person as a memoir that explores their own dietary experiences and personal feelings.

In the Canadian market, the book spent five weeks on Maclean's nonfiction bestseller list. The book spent 20 weeks on The Vancouver Sun's nonfiction bestseller list. The authors won the Roderick Haig-Brown Regional Prize from the British Columbia Booksellers Association for the best contribution to the enjoyment and understanding of British Columbia. The 100-mile diet concept, along with advocates of local food, were covered by media across North America. In 2009, Food Network Canada aired The 100 Mile Challenge, a television series co-created by MacKinnon and Smith and based on the book.

== Background ==
Alisa Smith and J. B. MacKinnon's idea of local eating began while visiting their cabin in northern British Columbia in August 2004. Their food supplies were nearly exhausted so to feed their dinner guests they scrounged the surrounding land for food. Their dinner of Dolly Varden trout, wild mushrooms, dandelion leaves, apples, sour cherries, and rose hips, along with potatoes and garlic from the garden, so impressed the couple that once back home, in their Kitsilano apartment in Vancouver, they pursued the idea of eating only local food. They eventually decided to try a diet consisting of eating food, for one year, grown within 100 miles of their home. They began the diet symbolically on the first day of spring, March 21. Beginning in June, they wrote articles for The Tyee about their experience. The couple, both in their 30s, each had experience in writing: Smith as a freelance journalist who had taught non-fiction writing, and MacKinnon as the author of the award-winning historical non-fiction book Dead Man in Paradise and a past editor of Adbusters magazine.

They were overwhelmed by the response, first from other locavores and then from local and international news media. Eleven articles were published in The Tyee series over the year, plus an additional four articles afterwards, between August 2006 and May 2007. They launched an independent website, 100milediet.org, in April 2006 and began writing the book. Random House published the hardcover version on March 12, 2007, in Canada as The 100 Mile Diet: A Year of Local Eating and on April 24 in the United States as Plenty: One Man, One Woman, and a Raucous Year of Eating Locally. The trade paperback was released in Canada by Random House's Vintage Canada imprint on October 2 and in the United States by the Three Rivers Press imprint on April 22, 2008.

== Content ==
The book consists of twelve chapters, plus an Epilogue and an Acknowledgements section at the end. Smith and MacKinnon individually write alternating chapters, each of which covers one month from March 2005 to February 2006. In the first chapter MacKinnon tells how his idea for the 100-mile diet began and Smith agrees to try it for one year. They begin symbolically on the first day of Spring, March 21, and define 'local' as 100 miles, a convenient radius that would include the Lower Mainland, the southern half of Vancouver Island, and Whatcom County and Skagit County in Washington state. Their exceptions to this rule include meals eaten while traveling, meals prepared by friends, and business lunches. Their initial month was expensive as they scoured grocery stores for whatever they could find. In the second chapter, Smith describes her and MacKinnon as an unwed urban couple in their early thirties with no children and living in a rented apartment. They recount how eating impacted their relationship before and after the diet, the anonymity of prepackaged foods, the traceability of their diet, and the diets of the indigenous Coast Salish.

The farmers' market opens in May and they are able to buy local honey to replace sugar. Seafood from the Strait of Georgia becomes a staple in their diet. The couple spend August at their cabin in northwestern British Columbia, where they fish the Skeena River, pick wild berries, and eat whatever grows in their garden. Back in the Lower Mainland, the September harvest provides them with melons, peppers, eggplant, grapes, and tomatoes. To prepare for winter they preserved corn and tomatoes, made jam from berries, collected herbs from their community garden, and bought many potatoes.

During the fall, each write on the troubles in their relationship. David Beers, the founder of the Tyee, hosts a 100-mile Thanksgiving dinner for Smith while MacKinnon was away. In November, during a family emergency, MacKinnon travels to Kamloops where he suspends his 100-mile diet a few days. They finally find a source of flour when they discover a farmer on Vancouver Island who grows his own fruits, vegetables, meats, and wheat. In December, Smith travels to Edmonton where her grandmother feeds her microwaved pasta which she accepts.

In January they find a restaurant that specializes in local cuisine and, previously vegetarians, they cook and eat beef for the first time in years. Working in Malawi, MacKinnon is struck by the contrast between their western diet and that of the poor country's: there is ample food supplies in Malawi but most is exported to Canada and the United States who buy the food they do not require. The couple learn about Mexican and Maya cuisine while in Merida, Mexico, for a wedding. The book ends with an epilogue, written by both Smith and MacKinnon six months after their one-year diet. They make a symbolic journey to Bamfield, within their 100-mile radius, to collect sea water for its salt and prove they could obtain their own salt supply.

== Style and genre ==
The book uses a first person memoir style with Smith and MacKinnon taking turns writing each chapter. The authors purposely avoided writing a self-help book in favour of the memoir style, saying, "We wanted to show readers that process, and how it affected us and let them see it through our eyes." The topics sometimes go beyond the motivations and challenges of the diet into more personal relationship issues. Prior to writing the book they created a general plan on where the narrative would lead. They took turns writing so they could monitor each other's progress. As the two alternate there are shifts in perspectives, though the overall theme of "traceability" persisted. The general tone has been described as charming, innocent, and sometimes funny. Smith's chapters have been said to demonstrate more honesty and vulnerability, while MacKinnon's were more "show pieces, little tours de force". The final chapter was authored together by Smith and MacKinnon writing as a disembodied third-person narrator to summarize and conclude the book.

== Reaction to the book ==
In the Canadian market, The 100-Mile Diet debuted at #10 on Maclean's nonfiction bestseller list on May 14. It spent five weeks on the list, peaking at #4. In the Vancouver market, the book spent 20 weeks on The Vancouver Sun's nonfiction bestseller list, peaking at #5. At the British Columbia Booksellers Association's BC Book Prizes, in April 2008, the book was short-listed for the Hubert Evans Non-Fiction Prize, while the authors won the Roderick Haig-Brown Regional Prize, awarded to the authors of the book that best contributes to the enjoyment and understanding of British Columbia.

The book has been called engagingly written, wisely researched, and honestly told. Critics admired the wit and humour. The book reviewer for The Globe and Mail admitted he grew impatient with the grand and repetitive statements about the changing global food system and the authors' hyperbole regarding their modest culinary discoveries. Compared to Kingsolver's Animal, Vegetable, Miracle, The 100-Mile Diet was found to be more compelling and easier to read, with Smith and MacKinnon more relatable and sympathetic than Kingsolver.

== Reaction to the diet ==
While the concept of only eating locally grown food is not new, the book coincided with the emerging popularity of the locavore movement and farmer's markets. Media outlets in North America examined the feasibility of only eating food produced locally, local food-themed events, and locavore groups. During World Food Day in 2006, playing off the popularity of Smith and MacKinnon's articles in The Tyee, the Vancouver City Hall held a 100-mile themed breakfast. Locavore groups have held local-only dinner parties and week-long challenges. Some restaurants and caterers offered 100-mile menus, one being The Herbfarm Restaurant in Woodinville, Washington. Some farmers, gardeners, or regional food producers began offering subscription services to deliver produce or urban farming or gardening services. The 100-mile diet spawned many variations to allow for various circumstances and motivations. Examples include the allowance of a few non-local items, like Barbara Kingsolver chose to include spices into her local diet, or expanding the geographic area to more convenient boundaries, like the economic region, or the entire state or province. A 'made-in-Manitoba' diet challenge led to a government Manitoba Food Charter recognizing and encouraging local food markets.

In 2014, the American writer Vicki Robin published Blessing the Hands That Feed Us, which described her experiment to eat food sourced within a ten-mile radius of her home in Washington state.
