= The 100 Mile Challenge =

- Title card
- Genre: Reality television
- Directed by: Eddie O.
- Narrated by: Noel Johansen
- Composer: Daniel Ross
- Country of origin: Canada
- Original language: English
- No. of seasons: 1
- No. of episodes: 6

Production
- Executive producers: David Paperny; Cal Shumiatcher
- Producer: Trevor Hodgson
- Production locations: Misson, British Columbia
- Editors: Patrick Carroll; Carmen Pollard
- Running time: 45 minutes (approx.)
- Production company: Paperny Entertainment

Original release
- Network: Food Network Canada
- Release: April 5 – May 10, 2009

The 100 Mile Challenge is a Canadian reality television series produced by Paperny Entertainment and aired on Food Network Canada. The series follows the lives and eating habits of six families living in Mission, British Columbia, who, for a period of 100 days, agreed to only consume food and drink that has been grown, raised and produced within a 100-mile (160 kilometre) radius from Mission. The series is based on the concept of local food consumption as described in the book The 100-Mile Diet authored by J.B. MacKinnon and Alisa Smith where the two authors describe their experience of eating locally for one full year. To coincide with the premiere of the series, FoodTV.ca launched a companion website that Canwest described as "the largest, most innovative and interactive companion website to a series to date".

After the series' initial run was concluded, it was announced that the global distribution rights to both the format and the program were acquired by the British company Passion Distribution after which Discovery Communications' Planet Green acquired the rights to broadcast the series in the United States.

The success of the series has also inspired other communities in Canada to organize similar challenges.

== Episodes ==
=== Episode 1 — Day 1: The Purge ===
J.B. MacKinnon (James) and Alisa Smith hold an information and recruitment session at a community hall in Mission, British Columbia. Their goal is to educate people on the distance that their food travels from the point of origin to their table as well as to find volunteers willing to take on a challenge where they will only consume food and drink that's been grown and produced within a 100-mile (160 kilometre) radius of their homes. Many people sign up and James and Alisa focus on six families whose progress the series will follow: Clark-Vernon, Hawes, McIntosh, Peters, St. Cyr and Weremchuk-Williams.

All of the families are allowed to have one final meal of their favourite foods regardless of that food's origin. The next day, James and Alisa remove from each family's home all food, drinks, spices and condiments that are non-local — meaning anything grown or produced outside of the prescribed 100-mile radius. The six families, who were previously unaware that the vast majority of the food in their home was grown and produced well over 100 miles away, are now left with mostly empty cupboards and pantries. Items removed from homes included such staples as bread, milk, eggs, potatoes, rice, pasta, oil, coffee, sugar and salt. The families are left facing their first challenge when trying to prepare breakfast the next morning.

One of the participants in the challenge is Steve Peters who owns a local grocery store. Steve dedicates a section of his store to food that strictly conforms to the guidelines of the challenge in order to help out the other families.

=== Episode 2 — Days 4 to 22: Back to Basics ===
On the very first day of the diet, the McIntosh family drops out of the challenge. Kyle McIntosh, husband and father, works long hours to support his family and is unable to stay away from fast food.

The rest of the families are taught how to live without the things to which they are most accustomed and how to implement substitutes for those staples of their diet. The Clark-Vernon family visits a local honey farm to see how honey's produced and to obtain honey as a substitute for sugar. The Hawes family visits a local organic wine maker where they work in the vineyard in exchange for some wine. The St. Cyr family goes to a local beach where they boil sea water in order to produce some sea salt. Alex Weremchuck learns to use chicory as a coffee substitute. James and Alisa help the families locate some flour so that the families can learn to make their own bread even though there is no local yeast available to be used as a leavening agent.

=== Episode 3 — Days 25 to 40: New Rules ===
The 100-Mile Diet book contained an explanation of what James and Alisa termed "social life clause". During their one entire year of eating locally, the two allowed themselves to eat non-local food when they would find themselves on a business trip, at a friend's house or in a restaurant for a business lunch or dinner. Some of the families have allowed themselves the same exemption so James and Alisa hold a meeting to clarify that the "social life clause" is not applicable to any of the families during the 100-day challenge.

Families continue to visit local food producing facilities to familiarize themselves with the origins of their foods. Mike St. Cyr visits a local farmer who produces free-range eggs and, in addition to learning about the process, helps deliver the eggs to a grocery store by bicycle. One family is taught about foraging and they set out to find food grown in the wild around their home. The St. Cyr family hold a birthday for their daughter and the Peters family celebrate their wedding anniversary; both families create a feast for their friends and relatives using only local ingredients.

=== Episode 4 — Days 50 to 69: Half Way There ===
With some newly gained experience in cooking locally, some of the families decide to showcase what they have learned, especially the family members who don't usually do the cooking. Alma Hawes and Alisa decide to cook a meal for James and Randy even though the men are the cooks in the family. Mike St. Cyr cooks a dinner for his wife Angela's birthday. Steve Peters and James challenge each other to a pizza cook-off. The Weremchuck-Williams family visits local restaurant for some cooking tips as well as going fishing at a local fish farm for the first time in their lives. The Clark-Vernon family, who actually live on a farm, slaughter and make sausage from a sheep which they raised and named "Duncan".

=== Episode 5 — Days 75 to 95: Pushing Limits ===
Families are taught to expand their cooking horizons by being forced out of their comfort zone. Angela St. Cyr is invited as guest to a celebrated Vancouver restaurant to learn some new skills and techniques from its executive chef. The Peters family gets outside tips on how to cook without a recipe. Cassie Clark-Vernon, an Aboriginal Canadian, is introduced to traditional First Nations cooking techniques at an aboriginal celebration. Randy Hawes hosts a barbecue for all of the families where all of the food is local and the event itself benefits a local charity.

=== Episode 6 — Days 99 and 100: Final Stretch ===
After 100 days, all of the food previously removed from the families' homes has been returned and the families are allowed to eat anything and everything they missed during the challenge. Families share their stories on the challenges and rewards of eating locally. While all agreed that eating locally required more time and planning and, in many cases, was also more expensive, many families reported positive health changes such as weight loss and increased energy. Some families also gained respect and appreciation for their food and are unwilling to completely abandon their new way of life and eating.
