= Destiny Ridge =

Canadian television series

- Genre: adventure drama soap opera
- Country of origin: Canada
- No. of seasons: 2
- No. of episodes: 26

Production
- Executive producers: Andy Thomson; Anne Marie La Traverse; William Wallace Gray
- Producers: Larry Raskin; Peter Lhotka
- Production companies: Atlantis Communications; Great North Productions

Original release
- Network: Global
- Release: November 29, 1993 – 1995

Destiny Ridge is a Canadian television drama series, which aired on Global in the 1990s. Produced by Atlantis Communications and Great North Productions in conjunction with a German firm, the series premiered on November 29, 1993.

Shot on location in Jasper National Park, the series centred on Don Jenkins (Richard Comar), Julie Fryman (Nancy Sakovich), Sam Whitehorse (Raoul Trujillo) and Walt Pernecki (Michael Tayles), park wardens trying to defend the park from a real estate speculator, Jack Kilbourn (Scott Hylands), who wanted to acquire land in the park for a development. Elke Sommer also starred as Anna Hansen, the owner of a small tourist lodge in the park who found herself in a love triangle with Jenkins and Kilbourn.

For its second season, the German production partner discontinued its involvement with the series, which the Canadian producers then "rebooted" as a more adult-themed soap opera, with new cast additions including Rebecca Jenkins, Laurie Holden and Kavan Smith, and the setting shifted to the nearby town of Argent. According to the producers, the second season revamp was more in line with the type of show they had originally wanted to make, and the wilderness "adventure drama" format of the first season had been at the behest of the German partners.

The series was a Gemini Award nominee for Best Dramatic Series at the 9th Gemini Awards in 1995.

Global announced the show's cancellation in June 1995, after its second season. In its place, Global picked up both Great North's Jake and the Kid, which debuted in 1995, and Atlantis's Traders, which debuted in 1996.
