= The Stagers =

- The Stagers logo
- Genre: Reality; Home design Lifestyle
- Starring: Matthew Finlason; Bridget Savereux; Maureen Powers
- Country of origin: Canada
- No. of seasons: 2
- No. of episodes: 26

Production
- Running time: 23 min.
- Production company: Paperny Films

Original release
- Network: HGTV
- Release: July 1, 2008 – June 30, 2009

The Stagers is a half-hour reality television show about home staging that airs on HGTV in the United States and Canada. It is produced by Paperny Films and stars Matthew Finlason, Bridget Savereux, and Maureen Powers.

== Synopsis ==
Official series synopsis from HGTV:

[The Stagers is] packed full of stunning transformations that turn dull for-sale spaces into spectacular residences that shine in today’s real-estate market.... Matthew, Bridget and Maureen – professional stagers from Dekora, one of Canada’s leading home staging companies – work to stage a range of homes while hustling to exceed client demands. Budgets and schedules are tight in the world of home staging which means the multi-tasking teams are always in the pressure cooker. From practical tricks on how to sell your home to the sparks that fly when the heat is on, each episode is a lesson in transforming a house from a first impression turn-off to a market gem.

== Cast ==
- Matthew Finlason, Stager
- Bridget Savereux, Stager
- Maureen Powers, Stager
- Gail Taylor, Stager
- Dina Holmes, Stager
- Brent Melnychuk, Stager
- Rukiya Bernard, Stager-in-Training
- Augustin Tretinik, Assistant Stager
- Sarah Steinberg, Assistant Stager
- Jennifer Eves, Assistant Stager
- Mitra Mansour, Assistant Stager

== Awards ==
Season 1 of The Stagers won four 2009 Leo Awards and was nominated for a fifth award.

- The Stagers Best Show in an Information or Lifestyle Series - Won
- Matthew Finlason Best Host in an Information or Lifestyle Series - Won
- Keith Behrman for Best Direction in an Information or Lifestyle Series - Won
- Margot Daley for Best Writing in an Information or Lifestyle Series - Won
- Grant Greschuck for Best Direction in an Information or Lifestyle Series - Nominated
