= Combat School (TV series) =

Canadian documentary television series

- Genre: Documentary
- Created by: David Paperny
- Country of origin: Canada
- No. of seasons: 1
- No. of episodes: 6

Production
- Executive producers: David Paperny; Cal Shumiatcher
- Running time: 45 minutes
- Production company: Paperny Films

Original release
- Network: Discovery Channel
- Release: March 10 – April 14, 2009

Combat School is a Canadian documentary television series that premiered on March 10, 2009, on the Discovery Channel. The show focuses on a platoon of soldiers as they undergo warfare training prior to disembarking for a tour of duty in Afghanistan. The series was produced by Paperny Entertainment. The series was narrated by Canadian actor Kavan Smith.

== Synopsis ==
Combat School documents the combat training and eventual deployment of infantry soldiers from 1 Platoon, Mike Company, 3rd Battalion, The Royal Canadian Regiment. The platoon of 40 men and women are followed through several months of training at CFB Petawawa, Ontario, CFB Wainwright, Alberta, and Fort Bliss, Texas. In the final episode, the soldiers are followed through their first two weeks in Afghanistan.

== Episodes ==
No.	Title	Original release date
1	"One Platoon"	March 10, 2009
1 Platoon travels to Fort Bliss, Texas – an area with a terrain that mimics the arid Afghan topography – to begin training. Right from the start 1 Platoon encounters difficulties, leaving Major Oberwarth worried as the soldiers move into live fire exercises.
2	"Who Here Wants to Die?"	March 17, 2009
With the reality that 1 Platoon is further behind in training than any other platoon at Fort Bliss, company commander Oberwarth does not mince words to get them motivated. Nighttime live fire exercises and IED training commence after a disastrous showing at convoy drills.
3	"A Virtual War"	March 24, 2009
After intense training in Texas, 1 Platoon returns home with change in the air. The soldiers move to the Canadian Manoeuvre Training Centre in Wainwright, Alberta for the most realistic, complex and technologically advanced combat training in the world.
4	"Hidden Enemies"	March 31, 2009
Without their leader, Captain Cox, 1 Platoon is assigned to a remote forward operating base for guard duty. Major Oberwarth becomes stretched for resources after a mock suicide bomber causes mass casualties. In 1 Platoon's absence, 2 Platoon is sent to save an important VIP from a downed helicopter, but may be driving into an ambush.
5	"Ready or Not"	April 7, 2009
When 1 Platoon tries to protect a disabled helicopter, Warrant Rhodenizer – commanding the platoon in Captain Cox's absence – is "critically injured" by shrapnel. One Platoon then reunites with the rest of Mike Company for their final major battle before the end of training.
6	"Trial by Fire"	April 14, 2009
After months of demanding training, the 'battle-ready' troops of 1 Platoon, Mike Company, 3rd Battalion, Royal Canadian Regiment finally arrive in Afghanistan – their home for the next six months. Assigned to a Forward Operating Base in the heart of Taliban territory, this will be the first time their combat skills are put to the ultimate test in the theatre of war.

== Soldiers featured ==
- Captain Jon Cox
- Major Cayle Oberwarth
- Lieutenant Colonel Roger Barrett
- Warrant Officer Bruce Rhodenizer
- Sergeant Mike Dwyer
- Sergeant Jamie Lewis
- Corporal Salvatore "Sam" Miranda
- Corporal Evynne Sop
- Corporal Derek Pannozzo
- Corporal Douglas Chick
- Corporal Katie Hodges
- Private Jeff Valentiate
- Private Dan Martin

== Home release ==
Combat School was released on DVD on October 13, 2009. The DVD set includes all six episodes of the series, plus over forty-five minutes of bonus footage.
