= Paperny Entertainment =

Vancouver-based film production company

Paperny Entertainment Inc.
- Formerly: David Paperny Films; Paperny Films
- Company type: Subsidiary
- Industry: Television production
- Founded: 1994; 32 years ago
- Founder: David Paperny
- Headquarters: Vancouver, British Columbia, Canada
- Key people: David Paperny (President); Audrey Mehler (Executive Vice President); Cal Shumiatcher (Executive Vice President); Aynsley Vogel (Vice President, Creative)
- Products: Television programs
- Services: Production
- Owner: Lionsgate Studios
- Parent: RoK Global Acquisitions (2008–2012); Entertainment One (2014–2024); Lionsgate Alternative Television (2024–present)

Paperny Entertainment Inc. (previously known as Paperny Films and David Paperny Films) is a Vancouver-based producer of television programming and films, ranging from character-driven documentaries to provocative comedy to quirky reality shows. It was founded by David Paperny, who was nominated for an Academy Award for his 1993 documentary The Broadcast Tapes of Dr. Peter.

In July 2014, Paperny Entertainment was acquired by Entertainment One, which in turn has been acquired by American toy manufacturer Hasbro on December 30, 2019. It was later sold to Lionsgate on December 27, 2023.

== Television series ==
Listed by the year the shows first aired.

=== 2001 ===
- KinK (Showcase, 5 seasons, 63 episodes)

=== 2005 ===
- Crash Test Mommy (Life Network)

=== 2007 ===
- Road Hockey Rumble (OLN, 26 episodes)
- My Fabulous Gay Wedding (Global, Logo, 2 seasons, 19 episodes)

=== 2008 ===
- The Week the Women Went (CBC, 2 seasons, 16 episodes)
- Jetstream (Discovery, 8 episodes)

=== 2009 ===
- The 100 Mile Challenge (Food Network Canada, 6 episodes)
- Combat School (Discovery, 6 episodes, follow-up to Jetstream)
- Glutton for Punishment (US Food Network, 5 seasons, 56 episodes)
- The Stagers (HGTV Canada, two seasons, 26 episodes)
- Chop Shop (Slice, 13 episodes)

=== 2011 ===
- Eat St. (Food Network Canada, 3 seasons to date)
- Dust Up (6 episodes)
- Consumed (HGTV Canada, one season)
- Dussault Inc. (City, 2 seasons, 32 episodes)

=== 2012 ===
- World's Weirdest Restaurants (Food Network Canada, one season)

=== 2013 ===
- Yukon Gold (History Channel)

=== 2014 ===
- Chopped Canada (Food Network Canada)

== Documentaries ==
The documentary The Boys of Buchenwald (2002) and Love Shines (2010) were produced by Paperny.

In 2008, Paperny partnered with David Ridgen and John Fleming on "The Civil Rights Cold Case Project" with the Center for Investigative Reporting. The project brought together partners from across the media and legal spectrum to reveal long-neglected truths behind scores of race-motivated murders from the civil rights era, and to help facilitate reconciliation and healing. The project sponsored work in civil rights-era cold cases, including that of African American shoe-shop owner Frank Morris who was murdered by the Klan in Ferriday, Louisiana in 1964, and that of Clifton Walker, a Natchez Mississippi mill worker murdered by Klan members the same year.

The documentary film Confessions of an Innocent Man (2007), which tells the story of a British-Canadian engineer William Sampson, won a Gemini Award for Best Biography Documentary Program.
