= Bob Blumer =

Canadian television personality

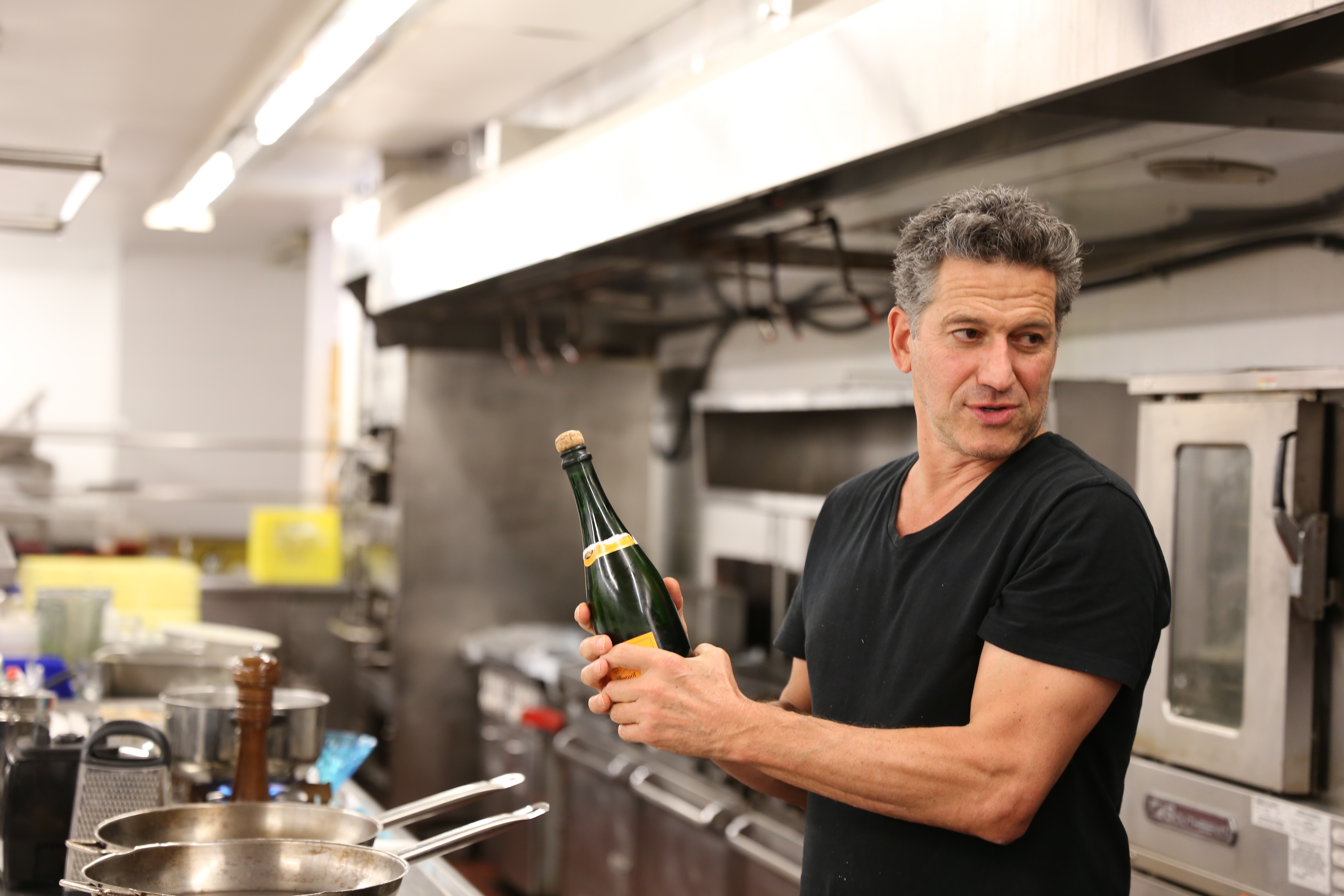
- Blumer in 2014
- Born: Montreal, Quebec, Canada
- Culinary career
- Television show(s): The Surreal Gourmet Glutton for Punishment World's Weirdest Restaurants
- Award(s) won: Leo Award for Best Host in an Information or Lifestyle Series 2008 Glutton for Punishment Galaxi Award for Best Information Program 2005 The Surreal Gourmet Gemini Award for Best Information Series 2004 The Surreal Gourmet 2003 The Surreal Gourmet Gourmand World Cookbook Award for Best U.S. Cookbook Accompanying a TV Show 2004 Surreal Gourmet Bites 2000 Off the Eaten Path International Galaxy Award for Best of Show 2001 Best of Grilled Pizza Prism Award for Excellence in Photographic/Graphic Illustration 2001 Mrs. Dash Can Can Chicken
- Website: bobblumer.com

Bob Blumer is a Canadian television personality. He was the creator and host of the Food Network shows The Surreal Gourmet, Glutton for Punishment, and the host of World's Weirdest Restaurants. He is also the author and illustrator of seven cookbooks, including the most recent Flavorbomb: A Rogue Guide to Making Everything Taste Better. Blumer was born and raised in Montreal, Quebec, but now resides in Los Angeles, California. Bob serves as an Ambassador to Second Harvest in Toronto spreading the word about food rescue and hunger relief. He is also an ambassador for Love Food Hate Waste, a National Canadian zero-waste initiative. He currently works as a spokesperson, does appearances, develops food-related content, and played a character loosely based on himself in the 2022 movie The Way to the Heart.

== Biography ==
Blumer was born in Montreal, Quebec.

=== Before cooking ===
In 1981, Blumer graduated from the HBA program at the Richard Ivey School of Business at the University of Western Ontario. From 1984 to 1993 he was business manager for Canadian singer-songwriter Jane Siberry.

=== As a writer ===
Books written by Blumer include:

- The Surreal Gourmet: Real Food for Pretend Chefs
- The Surreal Gourmet Entertains: High-fun, Low-Stress Dinner Parties for 6 – 12
- Surreal Gourmet Bites: Showstoppers and Conversation Starters
- Off The Eaten Path: Inspired Recipes for Adventurous Cooks
- Pizza on the Grill (co-written with Elizabeth Karmel)
- Glutton For Pleasure: Signature Recipes, Epic Stories, and Surreal Etiquette
- Flavorbomb: A Rogue Guide to Making Everything Taste Better

=== As an Artist ===
In addition to creating his signature surreal food presentations and illustrating his own cookbooks, Blumer’s illustrations and objets d’art can be found in many places:

• In 2012, he designed and fabricated the Surreal Gourmet Suite at the Gladstone Hotel in Toronto

• In 2016, he was commissioned to create a series of interactive food stations for the iconic Canadian photographer Ed Burtynsky.

• In 2020, he re-designed all of the public spaces and fabricated many pieces of sculpture for Shelter Hotel in Los Angeles.

Blumer’s artwork has also been commissioned by Emeril Lagasse, The Benziger Family Winery, the Hollywood Farmers Market, The 2019 Bonavista Biennale, and the Jessop Winery Art Gallery in Napa Valley, CA.

== Guinness World Records ==
As part of an episode of Glutton for Punishment shot during the 2008 Calgary Stampede, Blumer set a Guinness World Record on July 10, 2008, by flipping 559 pancakes in one hour. This record has since been broken in 2009 by Steve Hamilton, who flipped a record 956.

Due to Blumer's success in Calgary, the fifth and final season of Glutton for Punishment featured attempts to break six other world records. He broke all six records he attempted.

On June 12, 2010, Blumer broke the Guinness World Record for making the largest bowl of salsa at the 26th Tomato Fest in Jacksonville, Texas. Blumer and a crew of Jacksonville volunteers made a bowl weighing in at 2,672 pounds. The feat was filmed for Season 5 of his show Glutton for Punishment, which recorded Blumer's attempts to break six world's records.

On July 4, 2010, Bob Blumer broke the Guinness World Record for most pizzas made in an hour at the 14th Annual Corso Italia Festival in Toronto, Ontario. He made 168 pizzas in 60 minutes, complete with tomato sauce and cheese.

On August 30, 2010, Blumer broke the Guinness World Record for removing individual grains of rice from a bowl with chopsticks. He picked up 134 grains of rice in 3 minutes in Taiwan. This record still stands.

On July 10, 2010, Bob Blumer broke his seventh record by setting the fastest time for peeling 50 pounds of onions. Blumer set the record in 2 minutes 39 seconds at the Walla Walla Sweet Onion Festival in Walla Walla, Washington, United States. This record still stands.
