= Canadian Accredited Independent Schools =

Canadian Accredited Independent Schools (CAIS) is a national organization for independent schools in Canada. The current executive director is Anand Mahadevan.

== School inspection and regulation ==
CAIS inspects independent schools.

== History ==
=== Canadian Association of Independent Schools ===
The Canadian Association of Independent Schools (also known as CAIS) was established in 1981 as a national network for member schools supporting collaborative initiatives in leadership, education, management and governance. Its activities included organizing, co-ordinating, and facilitating conferences, benchmarking, senior management compensation surveys, and advocacy.

=== Canadian Educational Standards Institute ===
In parallel, the Canadian Educational Standards Institute (CESI) was established in 1986 as an organization to develop and promote educational excellence and school improvement in independent schools. Its key activities were to establish national standards or best practices and accreditation process, conduct 10 accreditation visits per year, and research professional development.

=== New organization ===
In October 2009, a vote was held at a combined annual general meeting for CAIS and CESI to create a new national organization. After consultation with the membership, a new organization was formed and named Standards in Excellence and Learning (SEAL Canada). However, in February 2011, the organization changed its name to Canadian Accredited Independent Schools (CAIS).

== CAIS accredited schools ==
CAIS encompasses 90 accredited independent schools, and its aim is to collaborate in the pursuit of leadership training, research and international standards of educational excellence. The stated vision of the organization is to be "Leaders in education, shaping the future of a courageous, compassionate world." According to the CAIS website, there are two CAIS-accredited schools in Bermuda.

CAIS accredited independent schools
Location	Gender	School	Day/Boarding	Grades	Diploma	Year Established
Kelowna, British Columbia	Co-ed	Aberdeen Hall	Day	PK-12	Provincial	2004
Belleville, Ontario	Co-ed	Albert College	Both	K-12	Provincial	1857
Oakville, Ontario	Co-ed	Appleby College	Both	7-12	Provincial	1911
Halifax, Nova Scotia	Co-ed	Armbrae Academy	Day	PreK-12	Provincial	1887
Ottawa, Ontario	Co-ed	Ashbury College	Both	4-12	Provincial	1891
Nanaimo, British Columbia	Co-ed	Aspengrove School	Day	4-12	Provincial	2003
Wilcox, Saskatchewan	Co-ed	Athol Murray College of Notre Dame	Both	9-12	Provincial	1920
Winnipeg, Manitoba	Girls	Balmoral Hall School	Both	K-12	Provincial	1901
Don Mills, Ontario	Co-ed	Bayview Glen School	Day	K-12	Provincial	1962
Sherbrooke, Quebec	Co-ed	Bishop's College School	Both	7-12	Provincial	1836
Toronto, Ontario	Girls	Branksome Hall	Both	K-12	Provincial	1903
Mill Bay, British Columbia	Co-ed	Brentwood College School	Both	9-12	Provincial	1923
Calgary, Alberta	Co-ed	Calgary French and International School	Day	Pre-12	Provincial	1969
West Vancouver, British Columbia	Co-ed	Collingwood School	Day	Pre-12	Provincial	1984
Toronto, Ontario	Boys	Crescent School	Day	3-12	Provincial	1913
Vancouver, British Columbia	Girls	Crofton House School	Day	Pre-12	Provincial	1898
Ottawa, Ontario	Girls	Elmwood School	Day	Pre-12	Provincial	1915
Vancouver, British Columbia	Co-ed	Fraser Academy	Day	1-12	Provincial	1982
Victoria, British Columbia	Co-ed	Glenlyon Norfolk School	Both	Pre-12	Provincial	1986
Winnipeg, Manitoba	Co-ed	Gray Academy of Jewish Education	Day	K-12	Provincial	1902
Toronto, Ontario	Co-ed	Greenwood College School	Day	7-12	Provincial	2002
Halifax, Nova Scotia	Co-ed	Halifax Grammar School	Day	JK-12	Provincial	1958
Toronto, Ontario	Girls	Havergal College	Both	K-12	Provincial	1894
Hamilton, Ontario	Co-ed	Hillfield Strathallan College	Day	PreK-12	Provincial	1901
Richmond Hill, Ontario	Co-ed	Holy Trinity School	Day	K-12	Provincial	1981
Bowen Island, British Columbia	Co-ed	Island Pacific School	Day	6-9	Provincial	1995
Innisfil, Ontario	Co-ed	Kempenfelt Bay School	Day	K-8	Provincial	1999
Vancouver, British Columbia	Co-ed	Kenneth Gordon Maplewood School	Day	9-12	Provincial	
Vancouver, British Columbia	Co-ed	King David High School	Day	K-12	Provincial	1987
Windsor, Nova Scotia	Co-ed	King's-Edgehill School	Both	6-12	Provincial	1788
Toronto, Ontario	Co-ed	Kingsway College School	Day	K-12	Provincial	1989
St. John's, Newfoundland and Labrador	Co-ed	Lakecrest St. John's Independent School	Day	K-9	Provincial	1993
Lakefield, Ontario	Co-ed	Lakefield College School	Both	9-12	Provincial	1879
Tecumseh, Ontario	Co-ed	Lakeview Montessori School	Day	Toddler-8	Provincial	1978
Richmond Hill, Ontario	Co-ed	Lauremont School	Day	K-12	Provincial	1961
Montreal, Quebec	Co-ed	Lower Canada College	Day	K-12	Provincial	1909
Calgary, Alberta	Co-ed	Lycée international de Calgary	Day	K-12	Provincial	1966
London, Ontario	Co-ed	Matthews Hall	Day	JK-8	Provincial	1918
Maple Ridge, British Columbia	Co-ed	Meadowridge School	Both	JK-12	Provincial	1985
Westmount, Quebec	Girls	Miss Edgar's and Miss Cramp's	Day	K-11	Provincial	1909
Toronto, Ontario	Co-ed	Montcrest School	Day	JK-8	Provincial	1961
West Vancouver, British Columbia	Co-ed	Mulgrave School	Both	PK-12	Provincial	1993
Toronto, Ontario	Co-ed	Paul Penna Downtown Jewish Day School	Day	K-6	Provincial	1998
Newmarket, Ontario	Co-ed	Pickering College	Both	K-12	Provincial	1842
Duncan, British Columbia	Co-ed	Queen Margaret's School	Both	K-12	Provincial	1921
St. Catharines, Ontario	Co-ed	Ridley College	Both	K-12	Provincial	1889
Toronto, Ontario	Co-ed	Robbins Hebrew Academy	Day	Nursery-8	Provincial	1957
Rosseau, Ontario	Co-ed	Rosseau Lake College	Both	7-12	Provincial	1967
Rothesay, New Brunswick	Co-ed	Rothesay Netherwood School	Both	6-12	Provincial	1877
Toronto, Ontario	Boys	Royal St. George's College	Day	3-12	Provincial	1964
Calgary, Alberta	Co-ed	Rundle College	Day	PreK-12	Provincial	1985
Halifax, Nova Scotia	Boys;Girls	Sacred Heart School of Halifax	Day	JK-12	Provincial	1849
Hamilton, Bermuda	Co-ed	Saltus Grammar School	Day	K-13	Provincial	1888
Westmount, Quebec	Boys	Selwyn House School	Day	K-11	Provincial	1908
Shawnigan Lake, British Columbia	Co-ed	Shawnigan Lake School	Both	8-12	Provincial	1916
Montreal, Quebec	Co-ed	Solomon Schechter Academy	Day	PreK-6	Provincial	1969
Devonshire, Bermuda	Co-ed	Somersfield Academy	Day	PK-10	Provincial	1990
Tsawwassen, British Columbia	Co-ed	Southpointe Academy	Day	K-12	Provincial	1916
Surrey, British Columbia	Co-ed	Southridge School	Day	K-12	Provincial	1995
Aurora, Ontario	Boys	St. Andrew's College	Both	5-12	Provincial	1899
Toronto, Ontario	Girls	St. Clement's School	Day	1-12	Provincial	1901
Vancouver, British Columbia	Boys	St. George's School	Both	1-12	Provincial	1930
Montreal, Quebec	Co-ed	St. George's School of Montreal	Day	K-11	Provincial	1930
Vancouver, British Columbia	Co-ed	St. John's School	Day	JK-12	Provincial	1986
Breslau, Ontario	Co-ed	St. John's-Kilmarnock School	Day	JK-12	Provincial	1972
Winnipeg, Manitoba	Co-ed	St. John's-Ravenscourt School	Both	K-12	Provincial	1820
Victoria, British Columbia	Co-ed	St. Michaels University School	Both	K-12	Provincial	1906
Oakville, Ontario	Girls	St. Mildred's Lightbourn School	Day	JK-12	Provincial	1891
Stanstead, Quebec	Co-ed	Stanstead College	Both	7-12	Provincial	1872
Vancouver, British Columbia	Co-ed	Stratford Hall	Day	K-12	Provincial	1999
Okotoks, Alberta	Co-ed	Strathcona-Tweedsmuir School	Day	1-12	Provincial	1971
Toronto, Ontario	Co-ed	TFS – Canada's International School	Day	Age 2 - G12	Provincial	1962
Toronto, Ontario	Girls	The Bishop Strachan School	Both	K-12	Provincial	1867
King City, Ontario	Co-ed	The Country Day School	Day	JK-12	Provincial	1972
Toronto, Ontario	Co-ed	The Leo Baeck Day School	Day	PK-8	Provincial	1974
Toronto, Ontario	Co-ed	The Mabin School	Day	JK-6	Provincial	1980
Montreal, Quebec	Co-ed	The Priory School	Day	K-6	Provincial	1947
Toronto, Ontario	Co-ed	The Rosedale Day School	Day	K-8	Provincial	1995
Montreal, Quebec	Girls	The Sacred Heart School of Montreal	Day	7-12	Provincial	1861
Toronto, Ontario	Boys	The Sterling Hall School	Day	K-8	Provincial	1987
Westmount, Quebec	Girls	The Study	Day	K-11	Provincial	1915
Toronto, Ontario	Co-ed	The York School	Day	K-12	Provincial	1965
Whitby, Ontario	Girls	Trafalgar Castle School	Both	5-12	Provincial	1874
Port Hope, Ontario	Co-ed	Trinity College School	Both	5-12	Provincial	1865
Toronto, Ontario	Boys	Upper Canada College	Both	K-12	Provincial	1829
Vancouver, British Columbia	Co-ed	Vancouver Talmud Torah	Day	PreK-7	Provincial	1934
Calgary, Alberta	Co-ed	West Island College	Day	7-12	Provincial	1974
Dollard des Ormeaux, Quebec	Co-ed	West Island College Montreal	Day	7-11	Provincial	1974
Vancouver, British Columbia	Co-ed	West Point Grey Academy	Day	JK-12	Provincial	1996
Vancouver, British Columbia	Girls	York House School	Day	JK-12	Provincial	1932
