= Conference of Independent Schools of Ontario Athletic Association =

North American sports conference

The Conference of Independent Schools of Ontario Athletic Association, or CISAA, is a sports conference for various private schools located primarily in the southern part of the province of Ontario. Many of the institutions are located in or near the Greater Toronto Area; one member school, Nichols School, is located in Buffalo, New York.

The CISAA grew out of the Little Big Four conference, consisting of Upper Canada College, Toronto; St. Andrew's College, Aurora; Ridley College, St. Catharines; and Trinity College School (TCS), Port Hope; four of the oldest private schools in Canada. Teams for the 37 schools currently in the CISAA regularly compete in numerous sports against public high schools in the Ontario Federation of Schools Athletic Association (OFSAA) provincial championships.

== Member schools ==
- Albert College
- Appleby College
- Bayview Glen School
- Bishop Strachan School
- Branksome Hall
- The Country Day School
- Crescent School (Toronto)
- Crestwood Preparatory College
- De La Salle College (Toronto)
- Greenwood College School
- Grey Gables School
- Havergal College
- Hawthorn School for Girls
- Hillfield Strathallan College
- Holy Trinity School
- Kempenfelt Bay School
- Kingsway College School
- Lakefield College School
- The Linden School
- Montcrest School
- Nichols School
- Pickering College
- Ridley College
- Rosseau Lake College
- Royal St. George's College
- St. Andrew's College
- St. Clement's School
- St. John's Kilmarnock
- St. Michael's College School
- St. Mildred's-Lightbourn School
- St. Thomas of Villanova College
- Sterling Hall School
- Toronto French School
- Toronto Montessori Schools
- Trafalgar Castle School
- Trinity College School
- Upper Canada College
- The York School
- Laureate college(ontario)
