= Southpointe =

Southpointe may refer to:

- Southpointe, Pennsylvania, an unincorporated community and census designated place in Pennsylvania
- Southpointe Academy, a private K-12 school in Tsawwassen, British Columbia
