= Rundle College Primary/Elementary School =

Coordinates: 51.0325653°N 114.1920571°W

Rundle College Primary/Elementary Program

Location
- 7615 17th Avenue SW; Calgary, Alberta; Canada

Information
- Type: Private
- Motto: Attendo ad Excellsiora (Attention to Excellence)
- Established: 1985
- School board: Rundle College Society
- Primary Principal: Lisa Danis
- Elementary Principal: Kirsten Klingvall
- Grades: K-6
- Campus: Suburban
- Colours: Burgundy and Grey
- Feeder to: Rundle College Jr/Sr High School
- Website: www.rundle.ab.ca
- Last updated: September 2024

The Rundle College primary and elementary program is part of Rundle College Society, an independent, co-ed, day school in Calgary, Alberta. The primary/elementary program is for students in Kindergarten to Grade 6, after which they can move to the Rundle College junior and senior high school program. Rundle College Society is also includes Rundle Academy, a school for students with learning disabilities in Grades 4 to 12, and Rundle Studio, an online school for students in Grades 7-11.

== Athletics ==
Students at this school are offered the Rundle College Jr. Cobras Sports Development Program, a program to help younger students get involved in the athletic-based community of Rundle College.

Jr. Cobras Sports Development Program
- The current logo for the sports teams known as the "Junior Cobras"

== Dress ==
Rundle College is a uniform school.

== Facilities ==
The Rundle College Kindergarten-Grade 6 program is located in the W.J. Collett building. Built in 2016, the W.J. Collett building is a modern facility with a striking balance between long corridors, breakout and community spaces, skylights, and angles. With exceptional mountain and meadow views, the architecture of the W.J. Collett School has been featured in Award magazine and considered for numerous industry awards.

Students have access to a learning commons, technology spaces, performing arts spaces, outdoor classrooms, multiple gymnasia, artificial turf playing field, multiple playgrounds, and a tarmac play area.

== See also ==
- Rundle College Society
- Rundle College Jr/Sr High School
