= SJK =

SJK may refer to:

- Kemi Sámi (ISO 639-3 code)
- São José dos Campos Regional Airport (IATA airport code) in Brazil
- Seinäjoen Jalkapallokerho, association football club from Seinäjoki, Finland
- San Juan Knights, a professional basketball team from San Juan, Philippines
- Shinjuku Station, JR East station code
- St. John's-Kilmarnock School, Breslau, Ontario, Canada
