= Hawthorn School for Girls =

Location
- 101 Scarsdale Road; Toronto, Ontario, M3B 2R2; Canada

Information
- Type: Private
- Motto: Veritatem Facientes in Caritate
- Religious affiliation: Catholic,
- Established: 1989
- Enrollment: 110
- Colours: Navy blue and red
- Mascot: Hawthorn Bee
- Website: www.hawthornschool.com

Hawthorn School for Girls is a private, independent, all-girls school located in Toronto, Ontario, Canada, and offers a Catholic education. It was established in 1989. Hawthorn is a part of the Conference of Independent Schools of Ontario Athletic Association (CIS), and a member of Canadian Accredited Independent Schools (CAIS).

== See also ==
- Education in Ontario
- List of secondary schools in Ontario
