= The York School (Toronto) =

Coordinates: 43.684699°N 79.393194°W

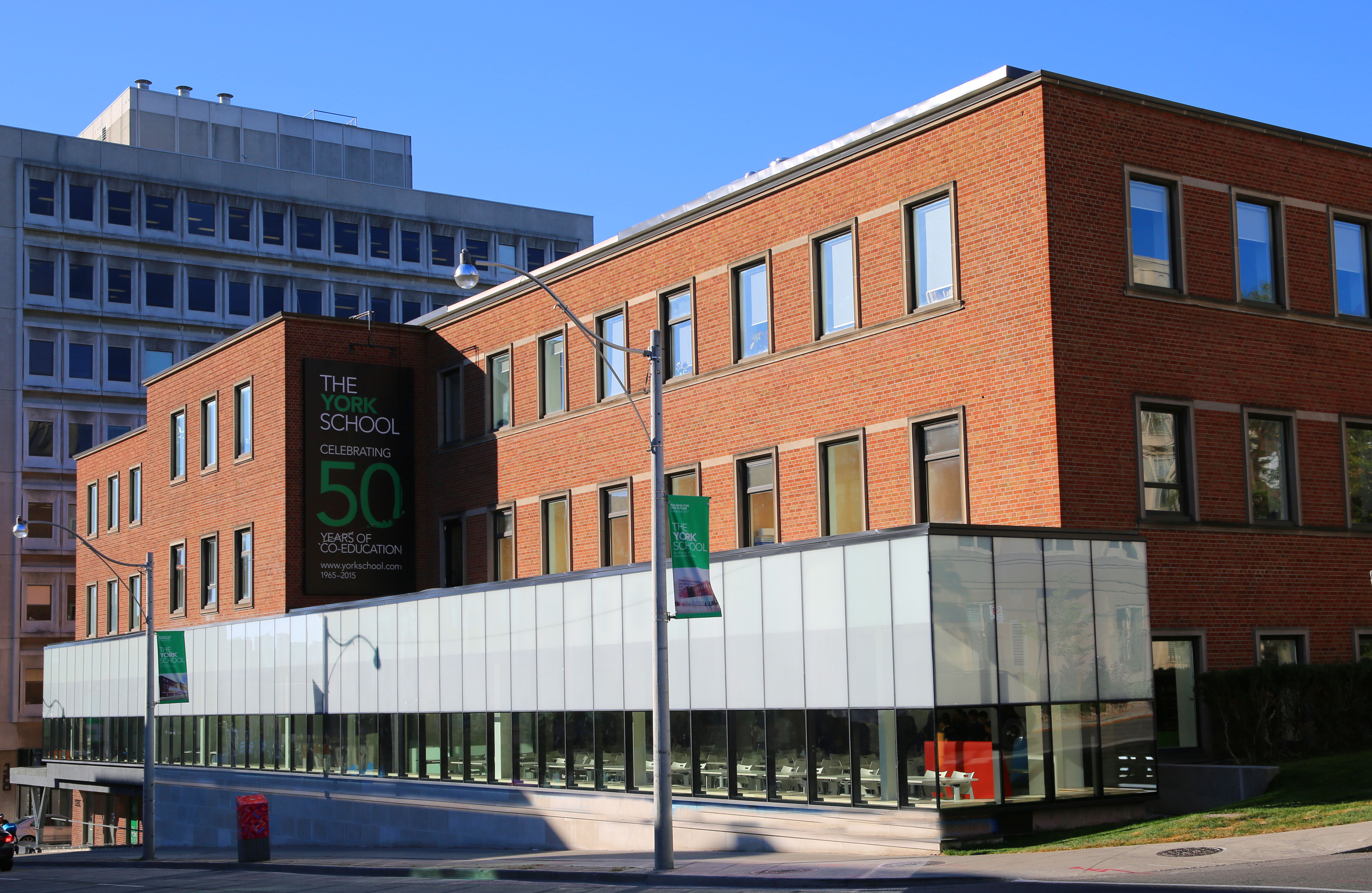
- Middle and Senior School campus at 1320 Yonge Street in Toronto

Location
- 1320 Yonge Street; Toronto, Ontario, M4T 1X2; Canada

Information
- School type: Independent day school Elementary and high school
- Motto: Experientia Docet (Experience Teaches)
- Established: 1965
- Chair: Dr. Patricia McMahon
- Head of School: Struan Robertson
- Interim Middle & Senior School Principal: Helen Gin
- Junior School Principal: Sara Sankari
- Grades: JK – 12
- Gender: Co-educational
- Enrollment: 755 (2025) (2019)
- Language: English
- Campuses: 1320 Yonge Street (Grades 7–12); 1639 Yonge Street (JK–Grade 6)
- Color
- Slogan: The curious go beyond.
- Athletics conference: CISAA and OFSAA
- Mascot: Bolt (an Ontario Peregrine Falcon)
- Team name: The York Storm
- Accreditation: Canadian Accredited Independent Schools
- Website: www.yorkschool.com

The York School (TYS) is a gender inclusive JK to Grade 12 independent school located on the subway line in midtown Toronto, Ontario. TYS was founded in 1965 and was the first English-speaking school in Canada accredited to offer the International Baccalaureate (IB) from Junior Kindergarten (JK) to university entrance (Grade 12). As an IB World School, TYS offers the IB Primary Years Program (PYP), Middle Years Program (MYP) and Diploma Program (DP). As of 2025, TYS is the only English language school in Toronto that offers the full IB (PYP, MYP and DP) in a co-ed/gender-inclusive environment.

TYS has two urban campuses located a few blocks from each other on Yonge Street, a Junior School and a Middle/Senior School. The school has approximately 750 students from over 20 countries. The school has a mix of Canadian and international families and offers a variety of co-curricular activities and community events, including a wide range of athletics.

== History ==
In 1965, Barbara Goodwin-Zeibots established The York School as a Montessori-based early years program for children aged three to six. In 1978, the school added a toddler program as well as an elementary school. The first Grade 8 class graduated in 1985. The Senior School was founded in 1995 with the addition of a Grade 9 class.

In 1997, the school was authorized to offer the IB Diploma. The first IB Diploma/Grade 13 class graduated in 2000.

In the late 1990s, 1320 Yonge Street was purchased through the "Home of Our Own" capital campaign. In September 2010, The York School opened a second campus at 1639 Yonge Street, which houses the Junior School (JK-Grade 5).

In 2003–2004, The York School was accredited to offer the IB Primary Years Program (PYP). In 2005, the school was accredited to offer the IB Middle Years Program (MYP).

The location at 1320 Yonge Street houses the Middle and Senior School campus for Grades 6-12. In 2015, The York School celebrated its 50th anniversary and announced a Capital Campaign to raise $5 million for the renovation of the Middle and Senior School campus at 1320 Yonge Street. The renovation is now complete.

=== Leadership ===
Barbara Goodwin-Zeibots remained the Head of School until retiring in the spring of 2006. She was succeeded by Ezio Crescenzi, who held the position until 2011. Conor Jones was the Head of School from 2011 until 2019. Struan Robertson was appointed Head of School in 2019, having served as Head of School at the Lakefield College School, Canada and International School Bangkok, Thailand.

== Curriculum ==
The York School offers the International Baccalaureate curriculum and incorporates additional school programs across all grade levels that focus on experiential and multi-disciplinary learning. The Primary Years Program (JK to grade 5), Middle Years Program (grades 6 to 10) and Diploma Program (grades 11 and 12) provide a continuum of education at The York School.

The school's IB approach to learning is transdisciplinary, incorporating shared themes and concepts across subjects including English, Arts, Science, and Technology.

=== Primary Years Program (PYP) ===
The York School offers the IB Primary Years Program (PYP) for students in JK to Grade 5. In its implementation of the PYP, the school focuses on the holistic development of each child, addressing academic needs alongside social, physical, emotional, and cultural growth. It is structured around guided inquiry, in which students are encouraged to ask questions and develop self-directed learning.

=== Middle Years Program (MYP) ===
The York School provides the IB Middle Years Program (MYP) for students in Grades 6 to 10. Through the MYP, students are encouraged to critically evaluate personal and global issues while developing their approaches to learning. The program at TYS incorporates the MYP's fundamental concepts of Holistic/Global education, Communication, and Intercultural Awareness.

=== IB Diploma Program (DP) ===
The two-year IB Diploma Program (DP) is for Grade 11 and 12 students. This program aims to prepare students for the intellectual rigour of university by fostering oral, written, research and analytical skills.

The IB DP includes specific requirements, such as:

- Extended Essay: an independent, self-directed piece of research that culminates in a 4,000 word paper to support students in developing analytical, synthesis, and evaluation skills.
- Theory of Knowledge (TOK) course: provides an opportunity for students to reflect on the nature of knowledge.
- Creativity, Activity, Service (CAS): CAS involves student participation in artistic activities, physical activities, and community service.

=== Personalized Pathway Program (Grade 11 and 12) ===
In 2024, The York School introduced the Personalized Pathway Program, which allows students in their final two years of high school to complete a combination of International Baccalaureate courses and Ontario Secondary School Diploma (OSSD) requirements. Students in the program attend classes alongside their peers and take core IB components, such as the Theory of Knowledge course, while selecting a tailored mix of courses.

=== Additional programs ===
==== Challenge Week ====
Challenge Week is an annual program at The York School for students in Grades 6 to 10, held each May. It involves trips within North America intended to align with elements of the International Baccalaureate curriculum and provide learning opportunities outside the classroom. For Grade 6, 7 and 8s, Challenge Week trips are Grade-wide and curriculum-based with students visiting Ottawa, Quebec City or Montreal. Grade 9 and 10 students can choose from a number of trips that include hiking the Juan de Fuca Trail in British Columbia, landscape painting in Killarney and participating in music activities in New Orleans.

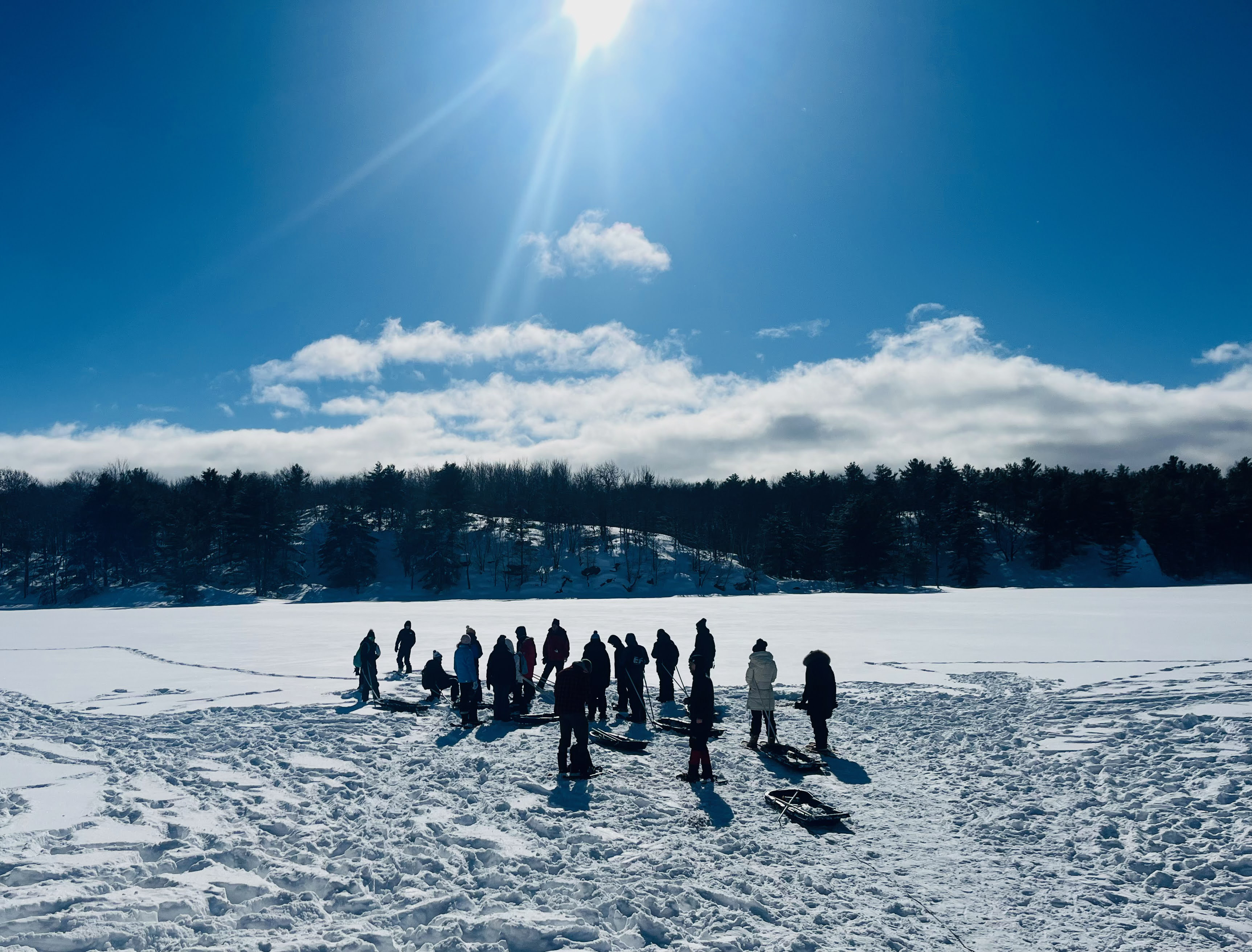
Grade 9 students engage in experiential learning as part of the Integrated Canadian Experience (ICE) program, which blends Canadian Civics, History, Geography, and Literature

==== Integrated Canadian Experience (ICE) ====
All Grade 9 students participate in the Integrated Canadian Experience (ICE), an academic program developed by York School faculty members that integrates Civics, History, Geography and Canadian Literature. The year-long course includes out-of-classroom learning, lectures from guest speakers, reading novels, conducting interviews and research, and applying knowledge to assignments that include creating videoblogs (vlogs), art projects and short documentaries. The program also incorporates a winter camping trip.

==== Optional international trips ====
Senior School students have opportunities to participate in international educational trips. Previous destinations have included India, Bhutan and Europe.

=== Technology in curriculum ===
In 2003, The York School established the Department of Learning, Innovation, and Technology to integrate technology across the curriculum. The school was one of the first in Canada to introduce a one-to-one laptop program. At the Junior School, students learn about robotics and coding by programming a robot that looks like a bumblebee. Students are also introduced to block coding to produce interactive digital stories and games. In Grade 6, students design, test, and launch rockets constructed from plastic bottles. Grade 7 Design classes include creating small-scale cars with the school’s 3D printers for the Pinewood Derby Race. In the International Baccalaureate Film course, students use the school’s equipment and digital tools to produce original film projects.

== Student Wellbeing team ==
The York School provides student support through its Student Wellbeing team, which includes a registered nurse, social workers, and learning strategists. The team works with students from Junior Kindergarten to Grade 12, as well as parents and teachers. Learning strategists assist students who require additional academic support or enrichment, both in classrooms as co-teachers and through individual or small-group sessions. Students in Grades 9 to 12 have access to wellbeing-related programming in the school’s Leigh Family Centre for Wellbeing.

== University counselling ==
The school has a University Counselling team to provide the information and guidance that students – and their parents – need to select the university and program that is most suitable for them. Every student is matched with a university counsellor as soon as they enter the Senior School. As the student and the counsellor meet throughout high school, the counsellor develops an understanding of the learner’s academic goals, extracurricular interests, personality and interests. With this knowledge, the counsellor helps the student identify and apply to universities.

== Co-curricular activities ==
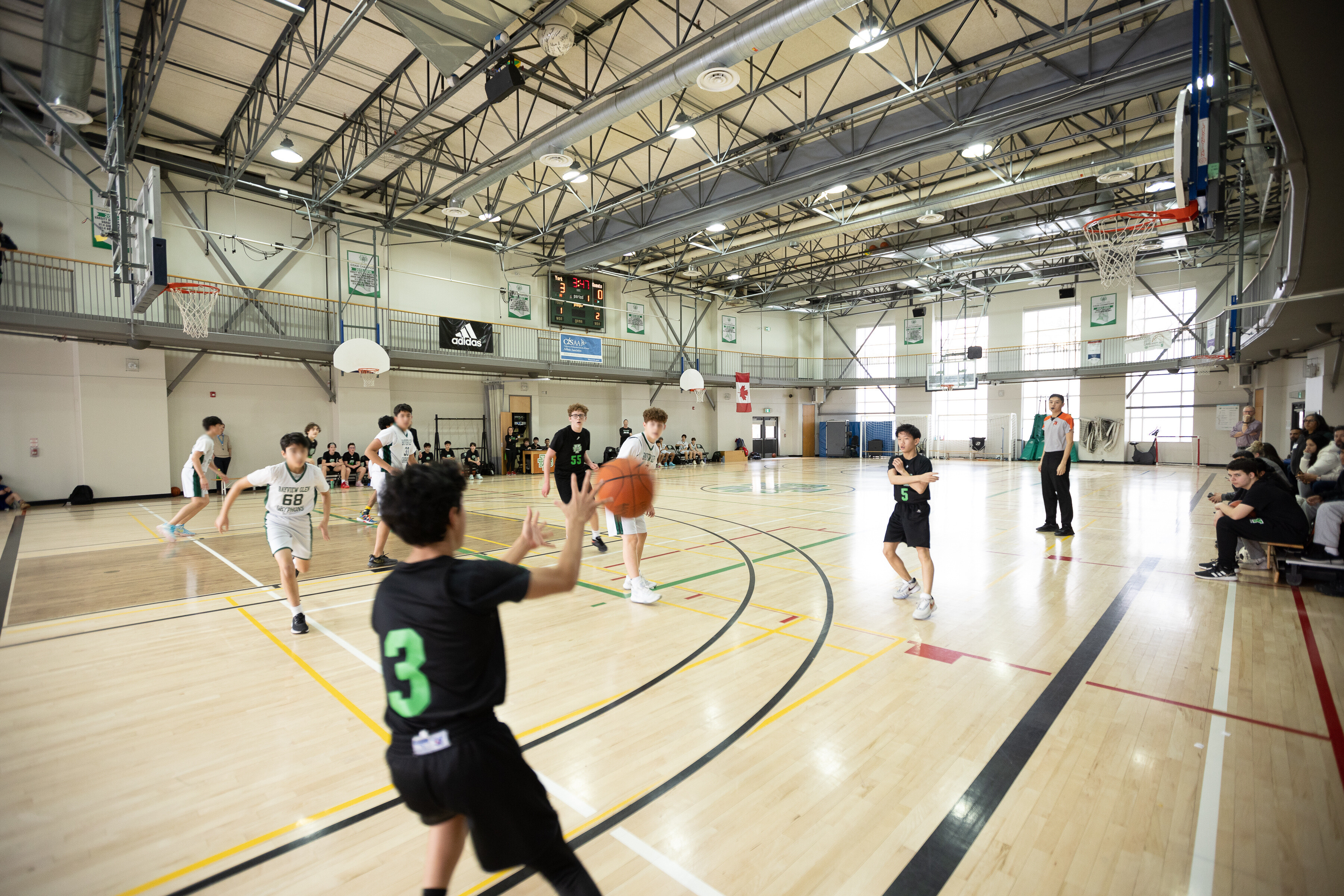
The gymnasium at the Middle and Senior School campus is home to The York Storm

The York School has over 100 co-curricular clubs and committees that provide experiences outside the classroom and engage students in community service.

=== Athletics ===
The school provides competitive team sports, development programs and intramurals with a focus on introducing students to a new sport or building on the skills they have. TYS has teams for cross country running, soccer, basketball, volleyball, and track and field.The school is a member of the Conference of Independent Schools of Ontario Athletic Association (CISAA) and the Ontario Federation of School Athletic Associations (OFSAA), a federation of 18 regional school athletic organizations across the province. The school has won more than 35 CISAA Championships since 2012. During the 2024-25 school year, TYS won an individual gold medal in the alpine skiing competition’s Open Boys Giant Slalom and a silver medal in the Girls Volleyball Championship, A Division (the school’s first team medal at OFSAA). Middle and Senior School student-athletes have access to facilities that include a double gymnasium, a turf soccer pitch, 3 on 3 basketball court, indoor 100-metre track, and a fitness centre. Junior School student-athletes have access to a gymnasium, a turf soccer pitch, and spaces for play and recreation. Students from all divisions also utilize nearby ravines and parks for cross country running, ultimate frisbee, and other outdoor activities.The school has about 50 competitive teams (with approximately 70 certified coaches), as well as a Director of Athletics and an Athletics Administrative Assistant.

== Campuses ==
The York School has two campuses in midtown Toronto, which are located on Yonge Street near St. Clair Avenue. The JK–Grade 6 students learn at 1639 Yonge Street (north of St. Clair Avenue), and Grades 7–12 students have classes at 1320 Yonge Street (south of St. Clair Avenue). In addition to classrooms and labs, campuses include gymnasiums, athletic commons, art rooms, a wellbeing center, a drama room, music rooms, cafeterias, playgrounds, libraries, and specialized rooms for film and STEAM learning.

In the summer of 2025, TYS began renovating the Junior School campus to create a brand new innovation lab, a larger cafeteria, a second gymnasium, a library and two classrooms for Grade 6. The renovation will be completed by January 2027.

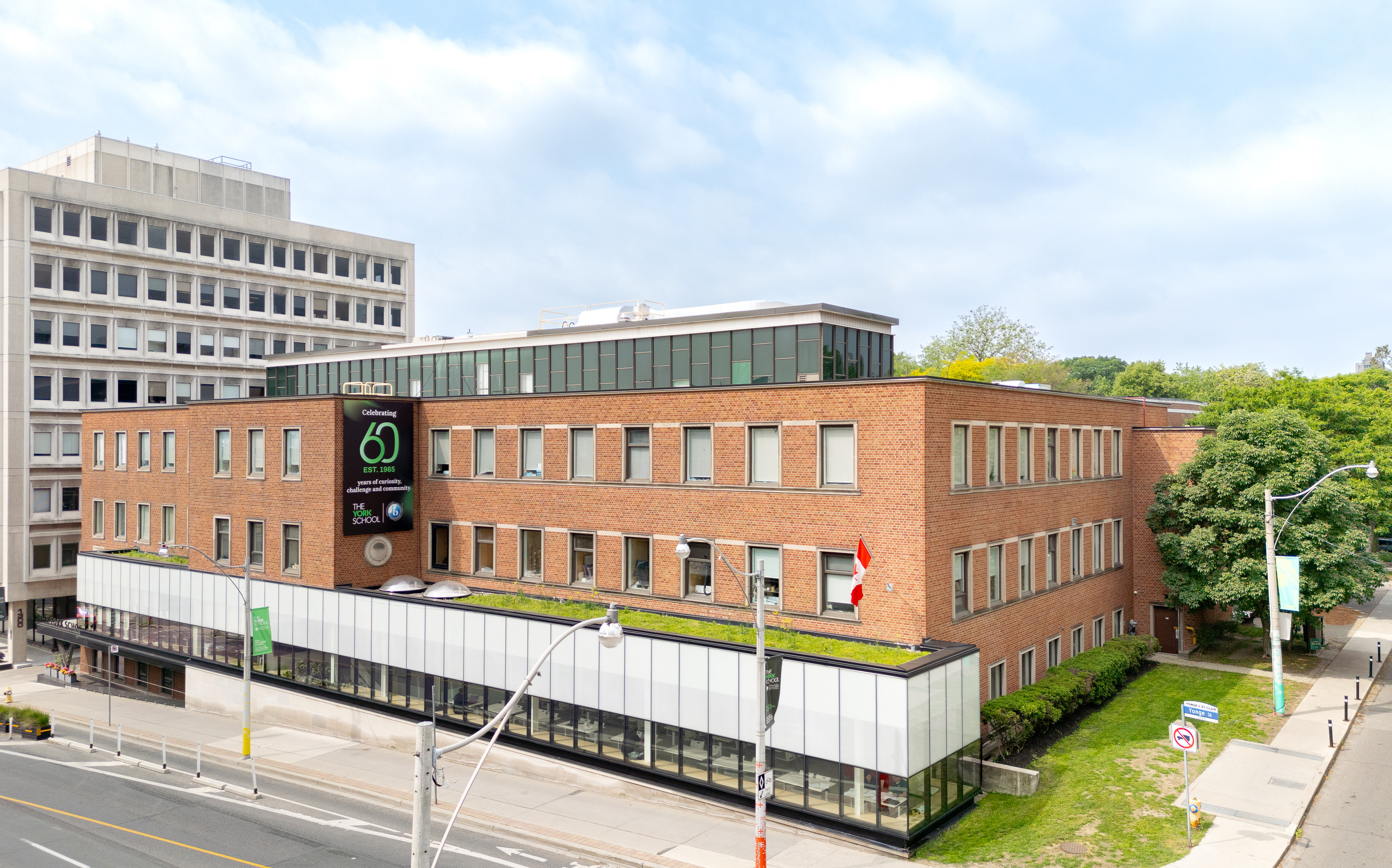
The Middle and Senior School campus at 1320 Yonge Street offers the IB Middle Years Program (MYP) and Diploma Program (DP)

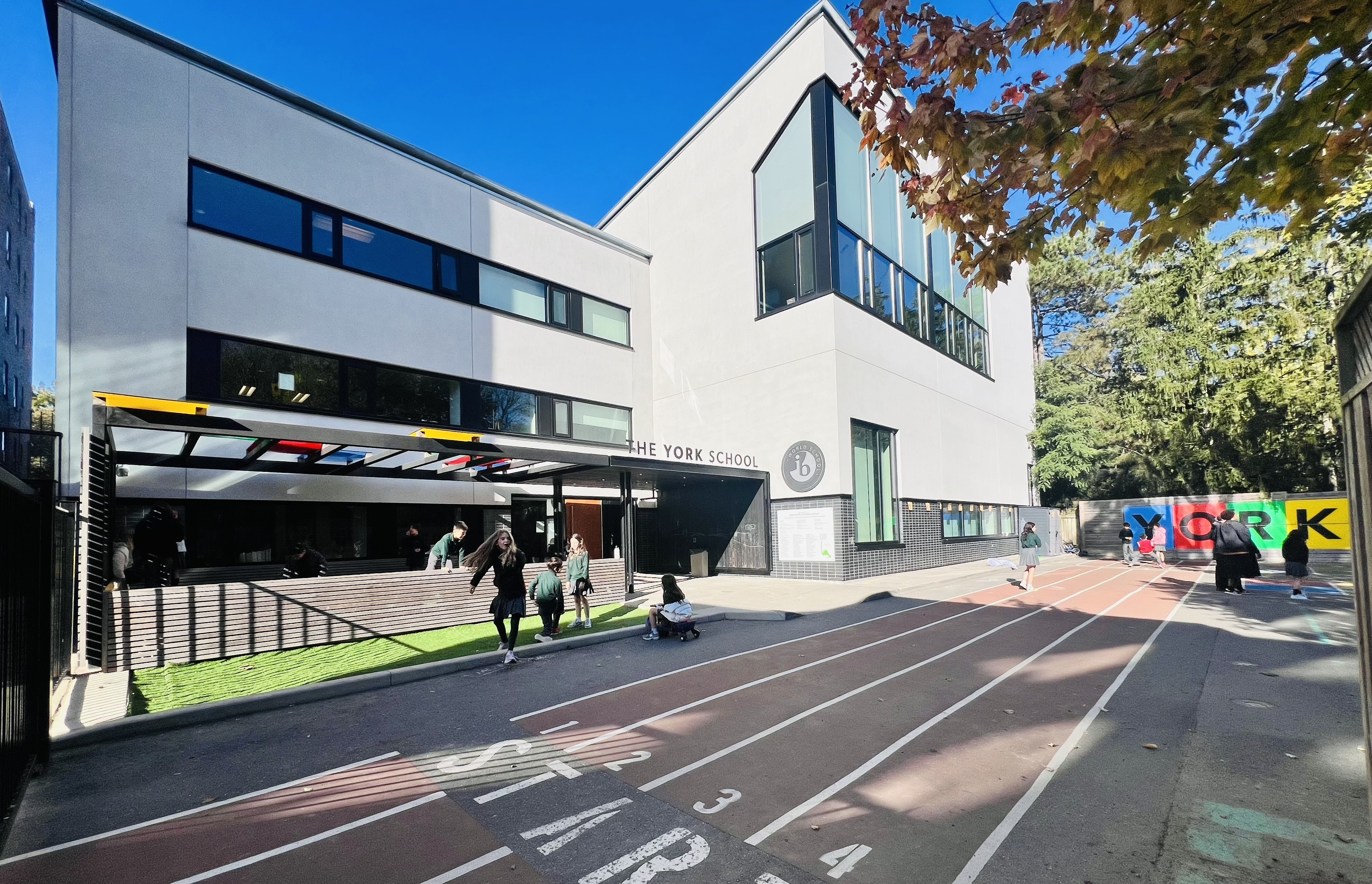
The Junior School campus at 1639 Yonge Street offers the IB Primary Years Program (PYP)

== Governance and operations ==
The York School is a not-for-profit corporation led by a Board of Directors. The board includes 17 directors who are appointed by the members of the corporation for a three-year term. As of 2025, the Chair is Dr. Patricia McMahon. The Board is composed of parents and community members who are experts in advancement, governance, human resources, marketing, law, finance and strategy. One of the Board’s responsibilities is to hire the Head of School. The Board also approves the annual operating budget, which is created based on the funding priorities. This includes approving decisions about tuition increases, external revenue sources and major fundraising or building initiatives.

=== Leadership ===
- Head of School, Struan Robertson
- Chief Financial Officer and Operations Lead, Janet MacMillan
- Associate Head, Academic Innovation, Justin Medved
- Associate Head, Wellbeing & Belonging, Elissa Kline-Beber
- Associate Head, External Relations, Hailey Meslin
- Junior School Principal, Sara Sankari
- Middle School and Senior School Principal, Kathryn Barnes
- Director, Human Resources, Keth Blair

=== Academic leadership ===
- Megan Stephenson, Vice-Principal & PYP Coordinator
- Ashleigh Woodward, Vice-Principal & PYP Coordinator
- Elise Currier, Vice-Principal& MYP Coordinator
- Fabio Biagiarelli, Vice-Principal & MYP Coordinator
- Marie Aragona, Vice-Principal and DP Coordinator

The school community is made up of faculty, staff, students, alumni and families. The York School Parents’ Association (YPA) is a volunteer organization that contributes to the school community.

== Tuition ==
As of 2025-2026 academic year tuition at The York School is $42,700. There is a $300 application fee and a $10,000 one-time, non-refundable fee upon acceptance of an offer of admission for new students enrolling.

The York School awards bursaries based on need to qualified candidates.

== Affiliations ==
The York School is a member of the Conference of Independent Schools of Ontario (CIS Ontario), the Canadian Accredited Independent Schools (CAIS), the Conference of Independent Schools of Ontario Athletic Association (CISAA) and the Ontario Federation of School Athletic Associations (OFSAA).

== See also ==
- Education in Ontario
- List of secondary schools in Ontario
