= Rundle College Society =

- Calgary, Alberta; Canada

Information
- Motto: Attendo ad Excellsiora (Attention to Excellence)
- Established: 1985
- Founders: Dr. Rod Conklin and Dr. WJ Collett
- Superintendent: Mr. Dave Hauk
- Headmaster: Dr. Jason B. Rogers
- Assistant Headmaster: Mr. Gary Sylven
- Grades: K-12
- Enrollment: 1158
- Website: www.rundle.ab.ca
- Last updated: January 2022

Rundle College Society is a not for profit organization operating three schools in Calgary, Alberta. Rundle College was founded in 1985 and provides education for more than 1150 students from kindergarten through Grade 12. Rundle's class sizes are small (typically 12–14 students).

== Facilities ==
Rundle College Society Operates Three Campuses in the Calgary Area:

- Rundle College Primary & Elementary ("W.C. Collett School" for Preschool to Grade 6)
- Rundle College Junior/Senior High ("R.C. Conklin School" for Grade 7 to Grade 12)
- Rundle Academy (Grade 4 – Grade 12, for students with a diagnosed learning disability)

== See also ==
- Rundle College Jr/Sr High School
- Rundle College Primary/Elementary School
