= Rundle College Jr/Sr High School =

Rundle College Junior/Senior High program

Location
- 4330 16 St SW; Calgary, Alberta; Canada

Information
- Type: Private
- Motto: Attendo ad Excellsiora (Attention to Excellence)
- Established: 1985
- School board: Rundle College Society
- Junior High Principal: Anna Miller
- Senior High Principal: Allison Belt
- Grades: Grades 7-12
- Colours: Burgundy and Grey
- Mascot: Coby the Cobra
- Feeder schools: Rundle College Primary/Elementary School
- Website: www.rundle.ab.ca
- Last updated: February 2019

The Rundle College junior and senior high program is part of Rundle College Society, an independent, co-ed, day school in Calgary, Alberta. The junior and senior high program is for students in Grade 7 to 12. Rundle also offers the Rundle College primary and elementary school program on the same campus. Rundle College was ranked the fifth best secondary school in Alberta in 2024, based on academic parameters. Rundle College Society is also includes Rundle Academy, a school for students with learning disabilities in Grades 4 to 12, and Rundle Studio, an online school for students in Grades 7-11.

== Athletics ==
Rundle offers teams for the following sports:

- Basketball
- Football
- Volleyball
- Soccer
- Wrestling
- Golf
- Cross Country Running
- Badminton
- Rugby
- Track and Field
- Badminton
- Esports

== Co-curricular activities ==
In addition to the athletic programs offered by Rundle College, there are also a number of co-curricular clubs run by teachers and students:

=== Arts ===
- Jazz Band
- Art Club
- Drama Production
- Yearbook Club
- Glee Club
- Winter Community Event
- Pom Squad

=== Intellectual Pursuits ===
- Speech and Debate
- Reach for the Top
- Science Olympics
- Chess Club
- Think Like a Doctor Club
- Library Leadership
- Eco Club
- Robotics team
- GETT Club (Girls Exploring Trades and Technology)

=== Character ===
- WEB Ambassadors
- L.E.A.D.E.R.S. Council
- PASS (People About Standing up for Social Change) Club
- Open Parachute Character Program
- Assembly Leaders
- House Teams
- Homeroom Advisory Program
- Art Club
- C.A.U.S.E Club (Community Volunteering)
- Speech and Debate
- Peer Support
- Photography Club
- Prefects
- Reach for the Top
- Robotics Club
- Drama Club/Annual Production
- Science Olympics
- Yearbook
- Business Club

== Dress ==
Rundle College is a uniform school.

== Facilities ==
The Rundle College junior and senior high programs are in the R.C. Conklin building. Built in 2005, the R.C. Conklin building is a modern facility located on 20 acres of land boasting exceptional mountain and meadow views, a park-like setting, and close proximity to high-speed and bus transit.

Rundle College students have access to multiple gymnasia, performing arts spaces, outdoor classrooms, technology centres, an artificial turf playing field, wrestling room, fitness centre, and a large gathering space/cafeteria.

== See also ==
- Rundle College Society
- Rundle College Primary/Elementary School
