= Fraser Academy =

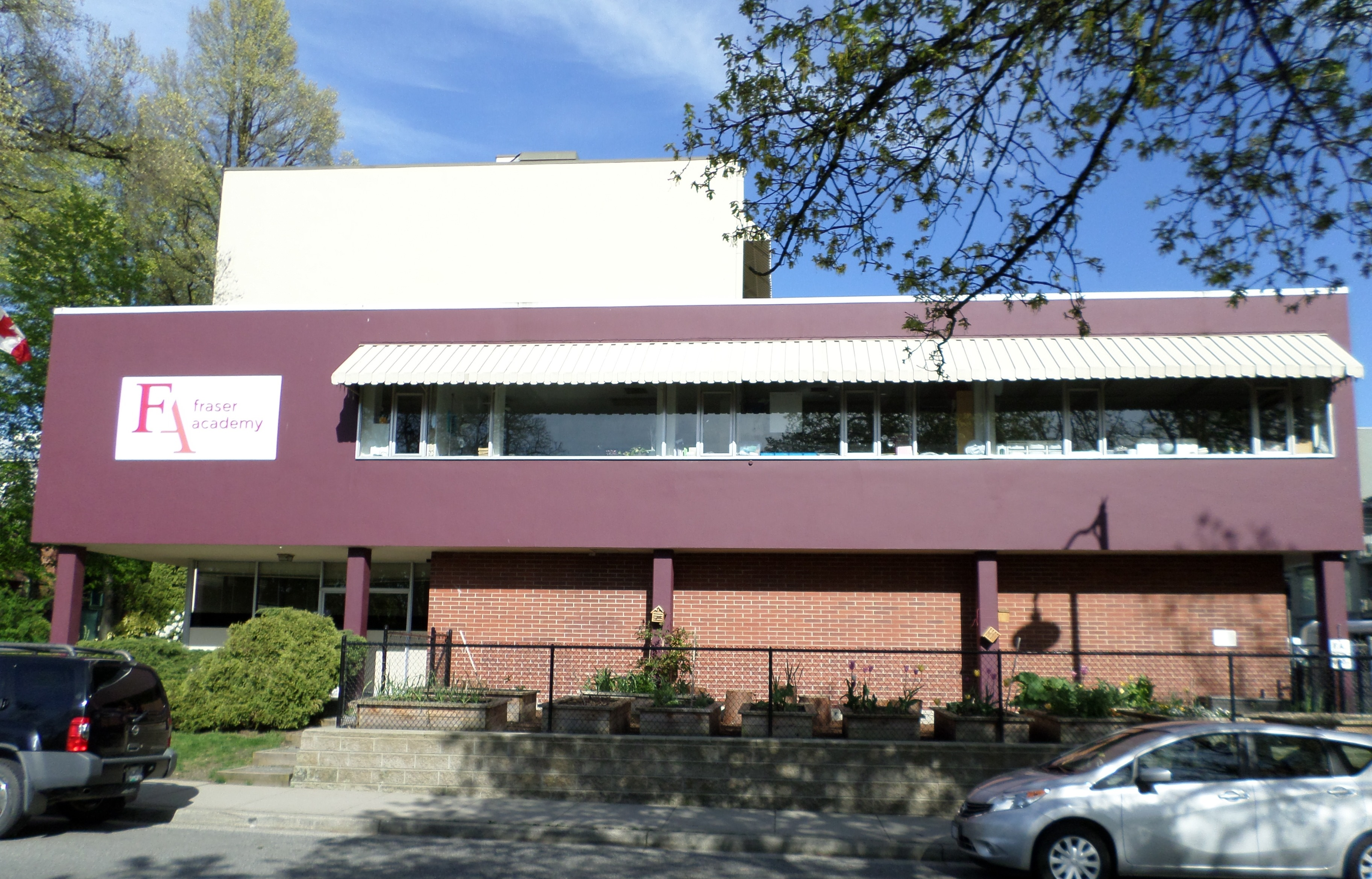
- Fraser Academy in May 2017

Location
- 2294 West 10th Avenue; Vancouver, British Columbia; Canada; 49.2628°N 123.1574°W

Information
- School type: Private
- Established: 1982
- Grades: 1-12
- Campus: Urban
- Colours: Maroon and Purple
- Mascot: Mustangs

Fraser Academy, located in Vancouver, British Columbia, Canada, is a private, non-profit, co-educational, non-faith, non-residential school that serves children from grades 1 to 12 with language-based learning disabilities such as dyslexia. Its teaching methods are based on those found at the Kildonan School in New York, using the Orton-Gillingham approach. Besides daily individual tutoring for language, students take the same courses as other students in the province, in which courses a multisensory approach is also used.

Founded in 1982 in Langley, British Columbia, the school moved into its present building in the Kitsilano neighbourhood of Vancouver in September 1986. The school has Smart Boards to assist and enhance the learning capabilities of senior students.

== Campus ==
The urban campus is located in the Kitsilano neighbourhood of Vancouver.

== University placement ==
Over 90% of Fraser Academy graduates go on to attend post-secondary education.

== Accreditation and membership ==
Fraser Academy is a member of the Canadian Association of Independent Schools (CAIS), Independent Schools Association of BC (ISABC), Federation of Independent School Association (FISABC), Learning Disability Association Vancouver, and the International Dyslexia Foundation (IDA).

== FAx Outreach Centre ==
In 2020, Fraser Academy expanded community outreach services for learners, educators, and the community at large. In addition to Orton-Gillingham tutoring, remedial math, executive function coaching, and NILD Educational Therapy, became available to children from any school. The outreach centre is known as "FAx" or "Fraser Academy to the power of X."

== Professional development ==
Fraser Academy offers professional development courses for educators throughout BC, including the 70 hour Orton-Gillingham Instructor Training (Course + Practicum)

== See also ==
- The Duke of Edinburgh's Award
- Assistive technology
