= Sully Burrows =

Canadian country singer and songwriter

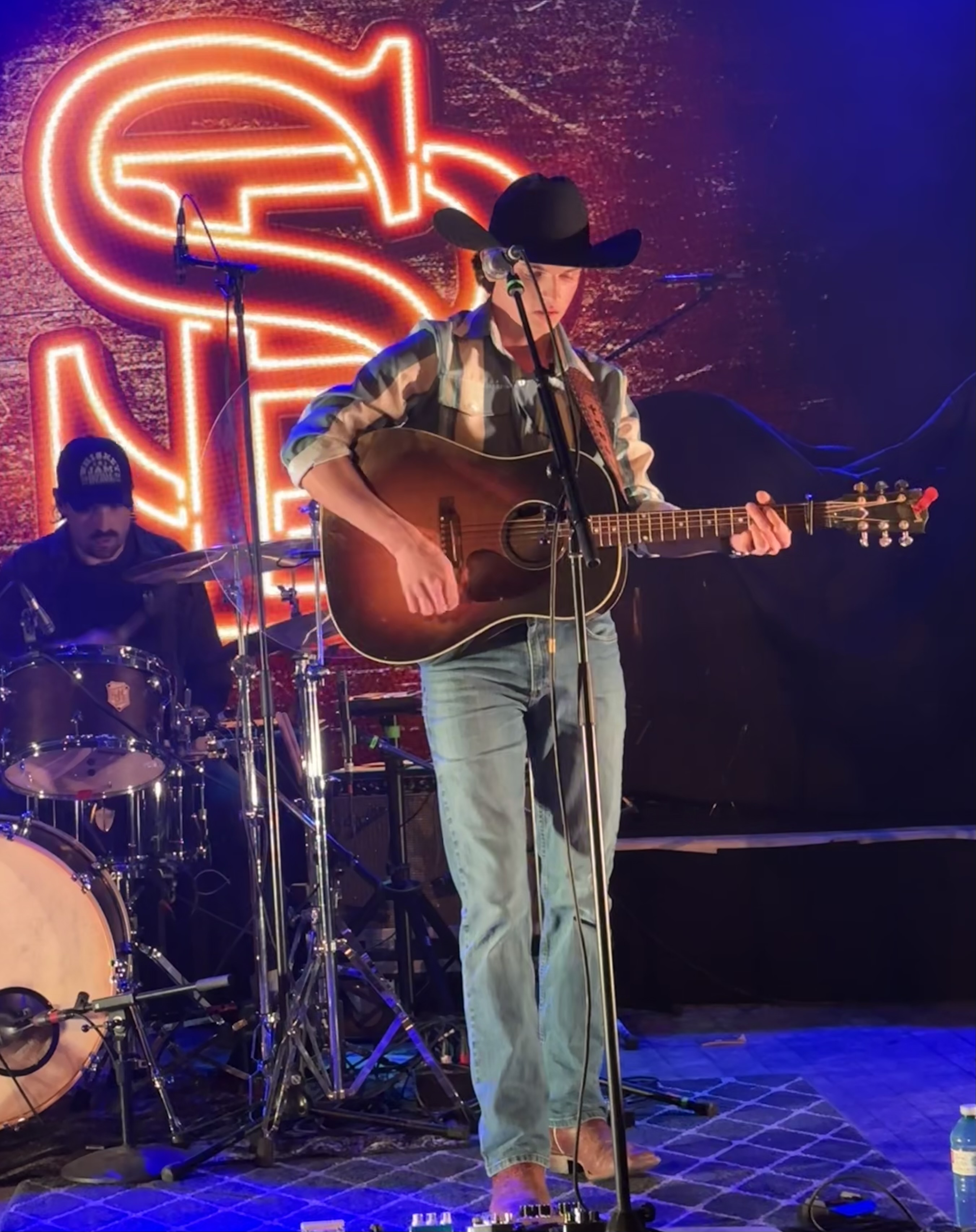
- Burrows performing at The Opera House in Toronto, Ontario, in February 2026

Background information
- Born: Sullivan James Burrows; October 24, 2006 (age 20); Parry Sound, Ontario, Canada
- Genre: Country
- Occupations: Singer; songwriter
- Instruments: Guitar; vocals
- Years active: 2024-present
- Labels: North Star; Partners; Royal City
- Website: Official website

Sullivan James "Sully" Burrows is a Canadian country music singer and songwriter from Parry Sound, Ontario. He has released one extended play Somewhere in a Small Town, and has charted in Canada with the singles "Rally Around" and "Put It on Me".

== Biography ==
Burrows was raised in Parry Sound, Ontario. He took piano, drums, and guitar lessons as a kid. Burrows played youth hockey for the Parry Sound Shamrocks. His grandfather Dave Burrows was a professional hockey player, who played for both the Toronto Maple Leafs and Pittsburgh Penguins. Burrows graduated high school from Rosseau Lake College in 2024. He began writing songs when he was 15 years old. Burrows had accepted an offer to go to Brock University to study sport management, but decided in August 2024 to withdraw his acceptance and instead pursue a full-time career in music.

In 2024, Burrows signed a record deal with Partners Record Label and released the song "Youth". In January 2025, Burrows released the song "Think of Me". In March 2025, he was an opening act on the Andrew Hyatt and the Ten Year War Tour. Shortly thereafter, Burrows released his debut radio single "Rally Around". The song went on to reach the top 20 of the Billboard Canada Country chart. Burrows won the Emerging Artist Award at the 2025 CMAOntario Awards. He was a finalist in the 2025 SiriusXM Top of the Country competition. In October 2025, Burrows released his debut extended play Somewhere in a Small Town, which includes "Rally Around" and six other tracks. In early 2026, he was the opening act for Jade Eagleson's "Coming Soon to a Honkytonk Near You Tour" across Canada and the United States.

In September 2026, Burrows signed with North Star Records as their flagship signing, and announced his extended play Leave You Lonely would be released on November 13, 2026. The EP will be supported by his debut headlining "Leave You Lonely Tour".

== Discography ==
=== Extended plays ===
List of EPs, with selected details
Title	Details
Somewhere in a Small Town	Release date: October 10, 2025; Label: Partners / Royal City Music Group; Format: Digital download, streaming
Leave You Lonely	Release date: November 13, 2026; Label: North Star Records; Format: Digital download, streaming

=== Singles ===
Year	Title	Peak chart positions		Album
Year	Title	CAN	CAN Country	Album
2025	"Rally Around"	—	13	Somewhere in a Small Town
2026	"Put It on Me"	86	14	Non-album single
2026	"Leave You Lonely"	—	56	Leave You Lonely

=== Music videos ===
Year	Video	Director
2024	"Youth"	Not listed
2025	"Rally Around"	Ben Knechtel
2026	"When You Know You Know"	Ben Knechtel
