= St. John's School (Vancouver) =

Private school in Vancouver, British Columbia

SJS (St. John's School)
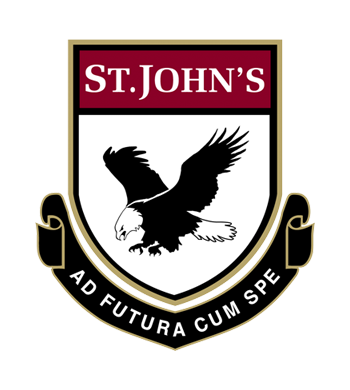

Location
- 2215 West 10th Avenue; Vancouver, British Columbia, V6K 2J1; Canada; 49°15′46.9″N 123°9′20.4″W

Information
- School type: Independent
- Motto: To the Future with Hope
- Established: 1986
- Head of school: Blayne Addley
- Faculty: 70
- Grades: JK–12
- Enrollment: 570
- Campus type: Urban
- Colours: Black and burgundy
- Mascot: Bald eagle
- Website: sjs.ca

SJS (St. John's School), in Vancouver, British Columbia, is an independent, co-educational, secular, IB World School for junior kindergarten to grade 12 students.

SJS is accredited by the British Columbia Ministry of Education. The school is a member of the Federation of Independent Schools Association (FISA), the Canadian Accredited Independent Schools (CAIS), and the Independent Schools Association of British Columbia (ISABC). SJS offers the International Baccalaureate's Primary Years Programme, Middle Years Programme and the Diploma Programme.

== History ==
St. John's was founded in 1986 as St. Andrew's School Society with fewer than 100 students from grades 3 through 10. In 1996, St. John's School purchased the present school facility in Kitsilano and, as part of the school's growth and expansion, land adjacent to the current location has been acquired and developed. The building of the Senior School was completed in September 2011. A new connecting building between the Junior and Senior schools was opened in mid-2019 as the Arts and Science Center.

In 2022 the school rebranded, updating its logo and changing its name to is more commonly used acronym, SJS. The legal name of the school is "SJS St. John’s School Society", operating as, "St. John’s School (SJS)".

== Students ==
As of 2025, there were 570 students in grades junior kindergarten to 12, with the Junior School running from junior kindergarten to grade 5 and the Senior School from grades 6 to 12.

== Academics ==
SJS is an IB World School offering the International Baccalaureate's Primary Years Programme (junior kindergarten to grade 5), Middle Years Programme (grades 6–10) and the Diploma Programme (grades 11 and 12).

SJS has several support systems in place for students. There are three social-emotional counsellors, a learning strategies team for both Junior and Senior School, and two university counsellors to provide students with support as they apply to university.

As an IB school, their current average IB score is 34. The global IB average as of 2026 is 30.9.

== Athletics ==
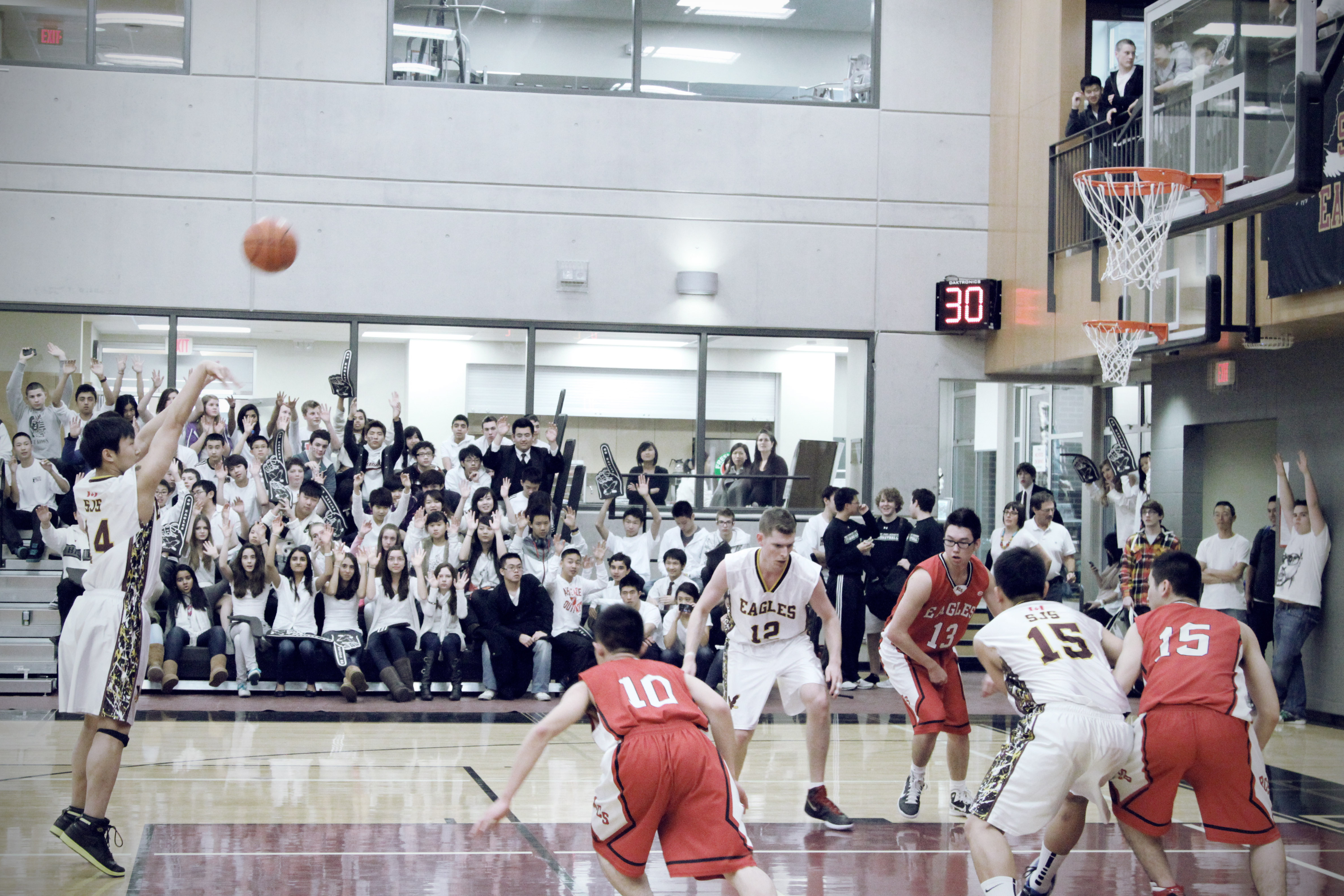
Basketball in the Gunn Gymnasium

SJS's athletics teams compete in the Greater Vancouver Independent Schools Athletic Association (GVISAA), which is recognized by BC School Sports, the Independent Schools Association (ISA), the Independent Schools Elementary Association (ISEA), the Canadian Association of Independent Schools (CAIS) and provincially at the Single A level. They practice in the school's two gyms, the Gunn Gym and the Junior Gym. In 2025, their basketball team won their first Single A tournament title at the BC School Sports Boys Basketball Provincial Championships.

St. John's has a variety of sports teams including:

- Badminton (competitive and recreational)
- Basketball
- Cross-country running
- Golf
- Ski and snowboard
- Track and field
- Ultimate
- Volleyball
- Toad in the hole

St John's also has academic clubs such as Debate and School Reach.

== Calendar ==
The school year runs September through June and is composed of three terms. Most courses are linear (year-long).
