= Armbrae Academy =

Location
- 1400 Oxford Street; Halifax, Nova Scotia, B3H 3Y8; Canada; 44°38′10.3″N 63°35′47.6″W

Information
- Funding type: Private
- Motto: in deo spero (Latin) (English: "I trust in God")
- Established: May 3, 1887
- Headmaster: Stephen Clarke
- Grades: Preschool–Twelfth grade
- Enrollment: 245
- Athletics conference: Nova Scotia School Athletics Federation
- Accreditation: Canadian Accredited Independent Schools
- Yearbook: Olla Podrida
- Website: armbrae.ns.ca

Armbrae Academy is an independent, university preparatory, co-educational, non-denominational day school from Preschool to Grade 12 in Halifax, Nova Scotia, Canada. It is accredited by and a member of Canadian Accredited Independent Schools.

== Facilities ==
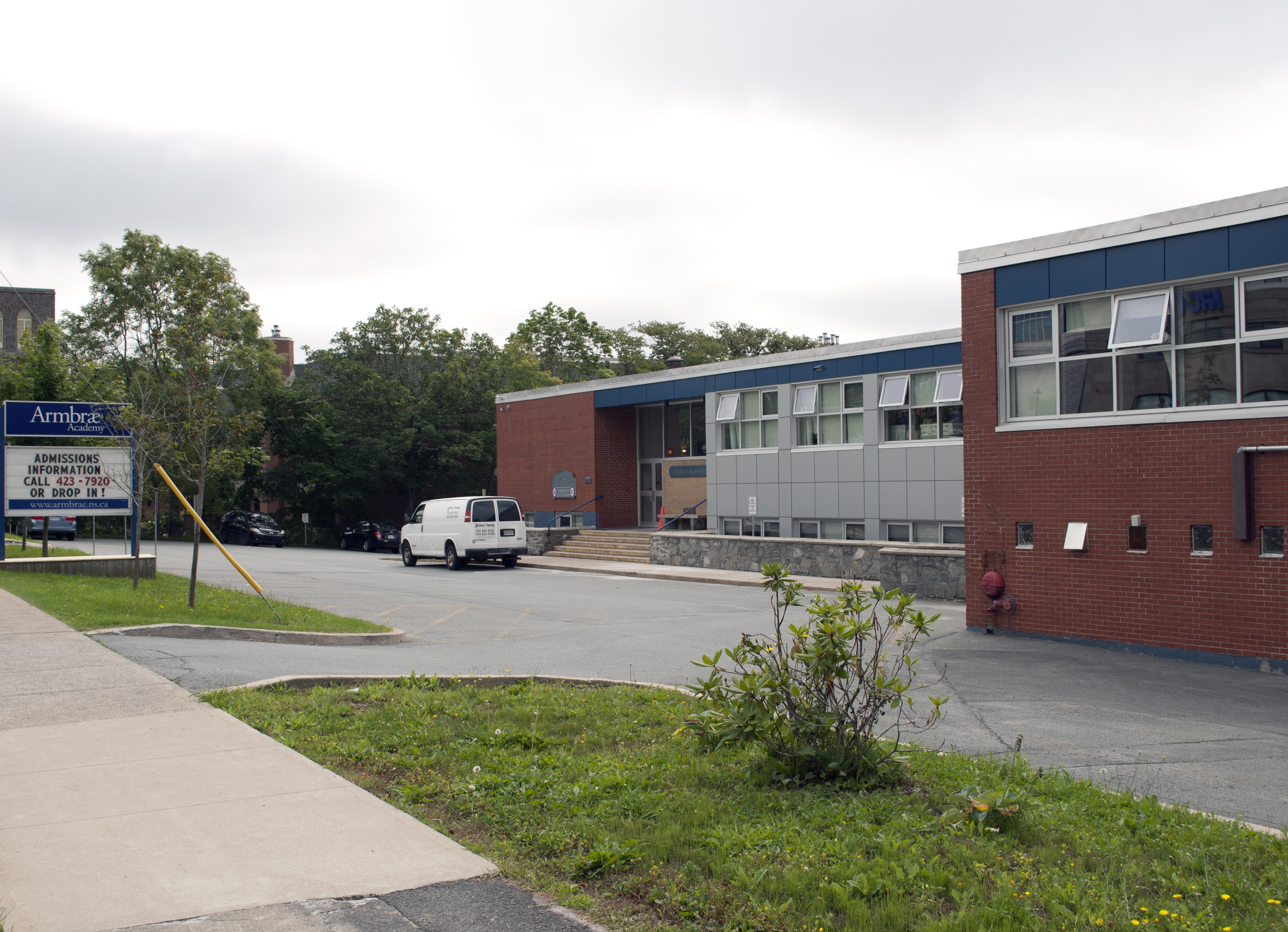
The Armbrae Academy building

The grounds of the school consist of a forest, playground, and small field covered with artificial turf. Armbrae completed construction of a multi-purpose building containing a gymnasium, art room and drama studio in April 2008.

All of the senior school's classrooms are equipped with Chromebooks. Armbrae also has a computer lab with more than 20 computers. All computers in the school are connected to the school's wireless network. The main building at Armbrae is undergoing a greening project. This project includes the replacement of older single-pane windows, all old energy-inefficient lights, and the original oil-fired boilers by more efficient natural gas burners.

== Secondary campuses ==
Armbrae also utilizes other buildings as secondary campuses. These include the Beth Israel Synagogue also known as Coburg (due to the street name) and the First Baptist Church also known as south due to its cardinal relation to the main school.
