= The Linden School =

Location
- 920 Yonge St. Toronto, Ontario, M4W 3C7; Canada; 43.68653°N 79.39275°W

Information
- Type: Independent school
- Established: 1993
- Founders: Diane Goudie and Eleanor Moore
- Grades: k-12
- Gender: Girls
- Average class size: 11
- Colour: purple
- Mascot: Linden Leaf
- Website: www.lindenschool.ca

The Linden School was an independent, girls school in Toronto, Ontario, Canada. Founded in 1993, The Linden School employed the Ontario Curriculum. The school is closed in July 2026.

== History ==
The Linden School was co-founded by Diane Goudie and Eleanor Moore and opened its doors to 37 students in 1993. The core vision was feminist pedagogy, an approach to learning rooted in equity, diversity, and empowerment for girls. Goudie and Moore were recognized for their work in girls' education with an honorary doctorate from York University in 2007.

Four teachers from The Linden School received national awards from the Government of Canada. Beth Alexander won a Prime Minister's Award for Teaching Excellence in 2017, Deidre MacPherson won a Prime Minister's Certificate of Achievement in 2020, Tonja Armstrong-Macinnis won a Prime Minister's Award for Early Childhood Education in 2021, and Sang Moo Lee received a Prime Minister's Certificate for Achievement in STEM in 2022.

The school had occupied a standalone building at 10 Rosehill Avenue, before moving to two floors of commercial space on Yonge Street.

== Operations ==
In 2014, the school had an enrollment of 120 students, with an average class size of 12.

In 2013, there were 32 co-curricular activities offered at The Linden School.

== Traditions ==
The Linden School had a range of annual traditions such as the school birthday celebration, which was held on the first day of the school year, all-school activities (weekly), week without walls, festival of lights and spirit week. There was also the opportunity for grade 11 students to participate in a model UN conference in Denmark, and for grade 12 students to organize and participate in a service oriented graduation trip.
