= St. John's-Kilmarnock School =

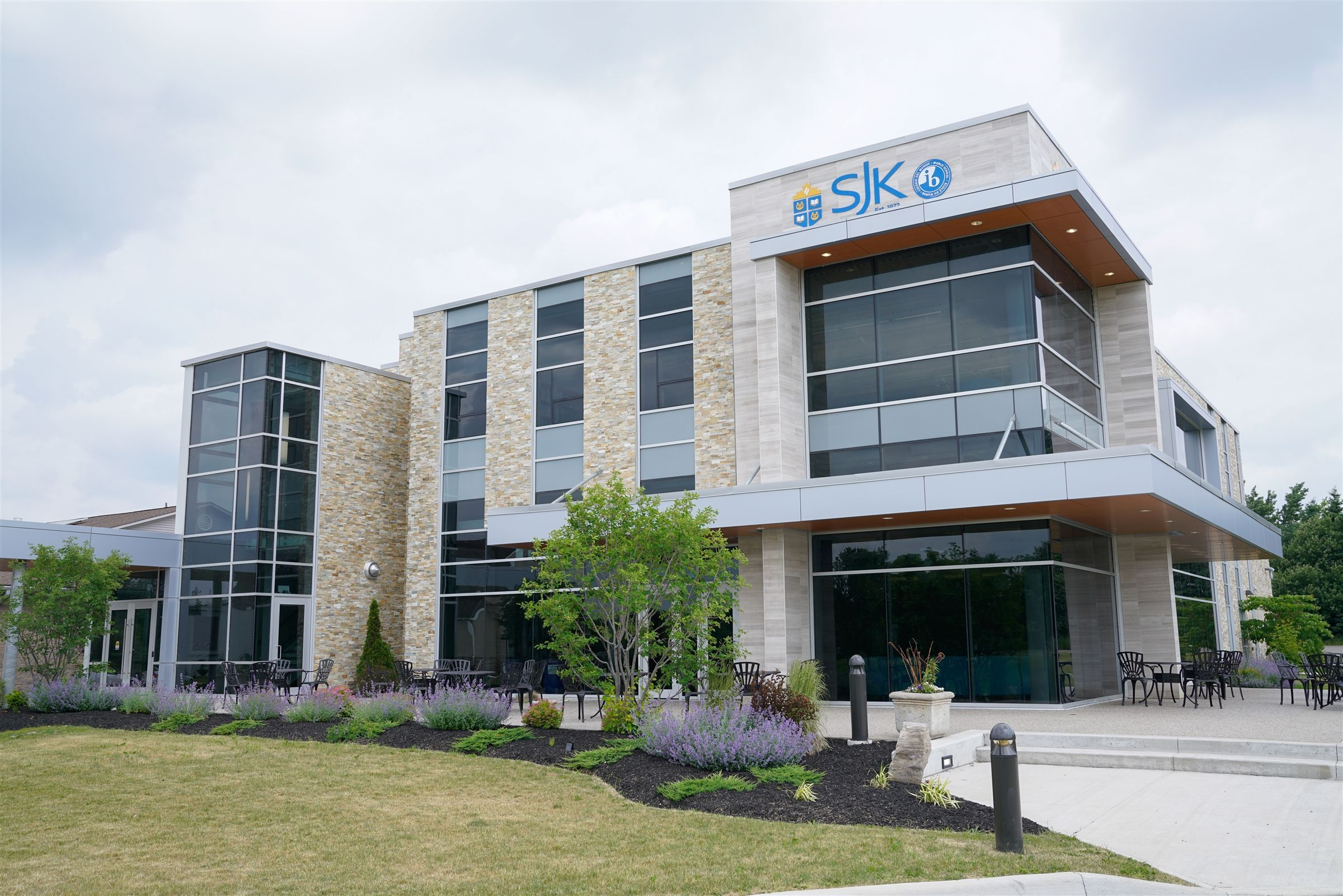
- St. John's-Kilmarnock School

Location
- 2201 Shantz Station Road; Breslau, Ontario, N0B 1M0; Canada; 43.5107°N 80.3831°W

Information
- Type: Independent boarding
- Motto: Latin: Accendere Flamma Donum Dei (To Stir Into Flame the Gift of God)
- Religious affiliation: Anglican Church
- Established: 1972; 54 years ago
- Founder: Bishop of Niagara, J.C. Bothwell
- School board: Board of Governors
- Head of School-Interim: Mr. Don Kawasoe
- Grades: JK–12
- Enrollment: 540
- Student to teacher ratio: 17:1
- Area: 36 acres
- Houses: Brock, Brant, Simcoe, Tecumseh
- Colors: Kilmarnock Gold & Blue
- Nickname: Eagles
- Newspaper: The Aquiline; Friday File
- Annual tuition: $78,800 (boarding) $21,290 to $33,140 (day)
- Affiliation: IB World; Canadian Accredited Independent Schools; National Association of Independent Schools; Conference of Independent Schools of Ontario
- Website: www.sjkschool.org

St. John's Kilmarnock School (often called SJK School or SJK) is an independent school in Waterloo Region, Ontario, operating under the International Baccalaureate program. The School is located on a 36-acre natural campus offering enriched educational programming for students from Junior Kindergarten to Grade 12 through its International Baccalaureate (IB) curriculum. SJK is the only accredited IB World Continuum School in Southwestern Ontario.

The school is divided into four houses named after historical Canadian figures: Brock, Brant, Simcoe, and Tecumseh. Aside from its main structure, the Breslau campus has a number of sports facilities and playing fields, a chapel, a dining hall, a library, a pond and corresponding boathouse, and an extensive network of forested trails.

== History ==
St. John's-Kilmarnock School (SJK) began in Elora in the late 1960s with a choral music program at St. John the Evangelist Church, initiated by Canon Robert Hulse. The success of the program led to the idea of establishing an independent school. Jim Chalmers, an educator and principal, took a leading role in founding the school. SJK officially opened in 1972 with 60 students in Elora.

The school expanded to include a separate campus for girls, St. Margaret’s School, in 1975. Both schools operated independently but shared some resources and activities. Due to growing enrollment and the need for more space, the senior campus moved to Waterloo in 1981 and became coeducational. The name changed to St. John’s-Kilmarnock School in 1983, incorporating the name of Chalmers' farm, Kilmarnock.

By the mid-1980s, managing two campuses became challenging, leading to the purchase of land in Breslau in 1986. The new campus opened in 1990, providing a unified location for all students. Over the years, SJK has developed modern facilities, including a chapel, gymnasium, boathouse, and dining hall.

Today, SJK is an International Baccalaureate Continuum school with over 400 students from Kindergarten to Grade 12. It remains true to the vision of its founders, focusing on high academic standards, arts, sports, and social development. SJK continues to thrive as a leading independent school in Canada. Now, SJK is an interdenominational institution, preserving its Anglican affiliation solely for ceremonial purposes. The school is now more diverse, drawing on a medley of cultural and economic backgrounds from the Waterloo region.

== Grading and curricular requirements ==
SJK uses a 7-point grading system as specified by the International Baccalaureate, in which a 7 is a 97-100% on the Ontarian grading scale, a 6 being a 95-97% and so forth. SJK has a student-to-teacher ratio of about 17:1. A majority of the faculty have advanced degrees in their fields. Students who attend SJK are required to partake in the curricular requirements of their respective component of the IB continuum. In the traditional four years of high school (split between 2 years of the IB Middle Years Programme and 2 terminal years in the IB Diploma Programme), students are required to take courses in epistemology, modern languages, the arts, English, history, mathematics, health & human development, and science. All students graduate with both an International Baccalaureate Diploma and an Ontario Secondary School Diploma (as per jointly satisfying both degree requirements).

== Student body ==
About 10% of the Upper School population is international students, all of whom reside in dormitories located near the University of Waterloo campus. The school offers ESL and TOEFL classes. The remaining 90% of the students are day students from the surrounding Waterloo and Guelph region communities.

== Finances ==
Tuition fees for boarding students for 2024-2025 is $78,800, including other mandatory and optional fees. Upper School tuition fees for day students starts at $32,020 and Lower School tuition fees for day students start at $21,290. Tuition fees for international day students is $49,510.

== See also ==
- Education in Ontario
- List of secondary schools in Ontario
