= Holy Trinity School (Richmond Hill) =

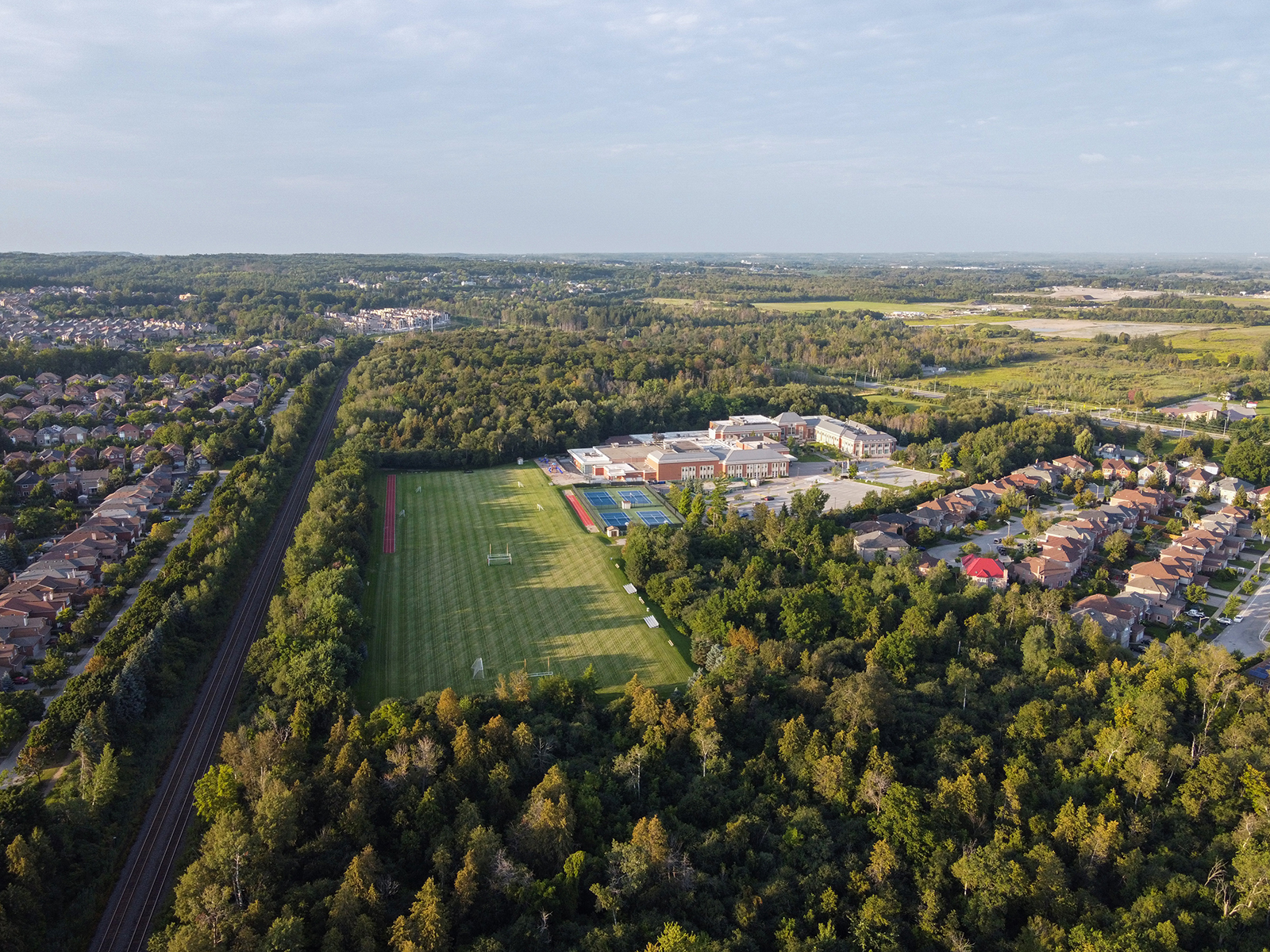

Location
- 11300 Bayview Ave. Richmond Hill, Ontario, L4S 1L4; Canada; 43.9057°N 79.4257°W

Information
- School type: Independent, Private
- Motto: Ex Doctrina Mores (As a result of knowledge, training, and education come character and right living)
- Religious affiliation: Christian
- Denomination: Anglican Church of Canada
- Founded: 1981
- Head of School: Amanda Kennedy
- Grades: Junior Kindergarten to Grade 12
- Enrollment: 825 (September 2023)
- Language: English
- Colours: Navy, Red and Gold
- Mascot: Hawk
- Team name: HTS Hawks
- Website: www.hts.on.ca

Holy Trinity School (HTS) is a private, co-educational, university preparatory institution located in Richmond Hill, Ontario, and affiliated with the Anglican Church of Canada. There are approximately 825 students currently enrolled from junior kindergarten to grade 12. HTS is an accredited member of the Canadian Accredited Independent Schools.

== History ==
HTS was founded in 1981 by members of Holy Trinity Church in Thornhill. The school’s first classrooms were in the church basement. However, enrollment grew quickly; within two years, HTS had relocated to more spacious quarters on Bainbridge Avenue in North York.

The school’s present campus was established on land purchased by the Board of Governors in Richmond Hill. This campus was officially opened in 1985 with the Lieutenant Governor of Ontario, the Honourable Lincoln Alexander, and the Archbishop of Toronto, the Most Reverend L.S. Garnsworthy, in attendance.

== Facilities ==
HTS is located at a facility situated on a 37-acre (0.15 km^{2}) campus in Richmond Hill, Ontario. The building underwent a major expansion in 2003 and again in 2016.

The facilities include:

- 46 classrooms
- 360-seat theatre
- Facilities for art, music and fabrication
- NEW Fitness Centre
- 2 innovation labs
- 2 libraries
- 400-seat Dining Hall
- 4 gymnasiums
- 3 playing fields
- 4 tennis courts
- 12-acre woodlot with a nature trail

Students at HTS are expected to take part in co-curricular activities.

Lower School

- Mad Science
- Outdoor Adventure
- Drama
- Computers
- Arts & Crafts
- Mandarin
- Peer Tutoring
- Tennis
- Ball Hockey
- Skating
- Yoga
- Glee Club
- Junior Engineering
- Robotics
- Golf
- Dance

Middle School

- Soccer
- Volleyball
- Field Hockey
- Basketball
- Cross Country
- Jazz Band
- Choir
- Chamber Winds
- Ball Hockey
- Skating
- Robotics
- Chess
- Peer Tutoring
- Drama
- Rugby
- Softball
- Tennis
- Track & Field
- Badminton

Senior School

- Model UN
- Senior Co-Ed Badminton
- Soccer
- Volleyball
- Field Hockey
- Basketball
- Cross Country
- Tennis
- Tritones Jazz Band
- Ice Hockey
- Track & Field
- Ball Hockey
- Squash
- Science Olympics
- Drama
- Rugby
- Softball
- Chess Club
- School Play

== Houses ==
Upon enrolment in the school, each student is placed into one of six "houses": Champlain, Bishop Mountain, MacDonald, Thorne, Rose or Langton. Throughout the year, the houses compete in both academic and athletic competitions to earn "house points". At the end of the year, a winner is announced. House points are earned from specific organized events throughout the year. House points can also be earned by bringing in assorted items to the various food or gift drives that are organized throughout the year or items like old cell phones, batteries and ink cartridges.

== Student government ==
There are a variety of student government initiatives in the senior school; the two main organizations are the Student Council and the Prefects. The Student Council is a fully elected organization with representatives of the council being elected by students from each homeroom. The purpose of the council is to represent the views of students and to promote and encourage school spirit and community. The Prefects are a team of elected students who are committed to fostering leadership, direction, and spirit in the student body while maintaining a positive environment. They function as an active voice representing the student body and serve as a bridge to the school administration and faculty.

Each year, the Prefect body selects a Head Prefect to lead them throughout the school year. The Head Prefect is responsible for chairing Prefect meetings, organizing all Prefect initiatives within the school, and having an overall pulse on school life. They are widely regarded as the most senior student leader and role model within the HTS community.

== Notable alumni ==
- Jordan Ullman, one half of the R&B duo Majid Jordan
- Dapo Afolayan, professional footballer who plays as a forward for Oldham Athletic on loan from West Ham United
- Rocco Romeo, professional soccer player who plays as a defender for Danish 1st Division club HB Køge, on loan from Toronto FC in the MLS
