= Southpointe Academy =

Coordinates: 49.0371°N 123.0679°W

Location
- 1900 56 Street; Surrey, British Columbia, V4L 2B1; Canada

Information
- School type: Private
- Motto: Ubique et aeterna (Everywhere and always)
- Founded: 2000
- Head of school: Gordon MacIntyre
- Grades: K-12
- Enrollment: 630
- Colours: Blue, Yellow, Green
- Team name: Titans
- Website: www.southpointe.ca
- Last updated: October 26, 2022

The building opened in 2012

Southpointe Academy is a private K-12 school in Tsawwassen, British Columbia, Canada. It is a secular, co-education day school with approximately 630 students. Southpointe is authorized IB school offering the IB Primary Years Programme, IB Middle Years Programme, and the IB Diploma Programme. The school moved to a new building in 2012 and contains learning spaces for various art and STEM subjects that offer hands-on experiences. Southpointe also offers service and outdoor education programmes.

Southpointe is certified as a provider of the PYP and MYP IB programs
