= Rundle Academy =

Location
- 4330 16th Street SW; Calgary, Alberta; Canada

Information
- Type: Private
- Motto: Attendo ad Excellsiora (Attention to Excellence)
- Established: 1996
- School board: Rundle College Society
- Principal: Alan Howie
- Grades: 4-12
- Campus: Suburban
- Colours: Burgundy and Grey
- Slogan: We Move Mountains
- Website: rundle.ab.ca/schools/academy
- Last updated: June 2019

Rundle Academy is an Independent School in Calgary, Alberta, part of Rundle College Society, and specializes in the instruction of students who have learning disabilities. Students at Rundle Academy typically have an average to above average intelligence but struggle in one or more areas of learning. As a result, the students typically underachieve in one of their core academic areas.

The school has a population of 200 students in Grades 4-12. The classes at Rundle Academy range from 6 students per class in Elementary to 10 students per class in High School. Teachers utilize differentiated instruction and differentiated assessment to help their students achieve their personal best. All classrooms are equipped with assistive technology to help students. These technologies include: ActivBoards, SMART Boards, Neo personal word processors, laptop computers and desktop computers. Rundle Academy follows the Alberta Learning Curriculum and aims to have each of its students graduate with a High School Diploma.

== Athletics ==
Some of the sports offered to students are:

- Badminton
- Basketball
- Cross Country
- Football
- Golf
- Rugby
- Soccer
- Track and Field
- Ultimate Frisbee
- Volleyball
- Wrestling
