= Tsawwassen =

Tsawwassen sc̓əwaθən
- Neighbourhood
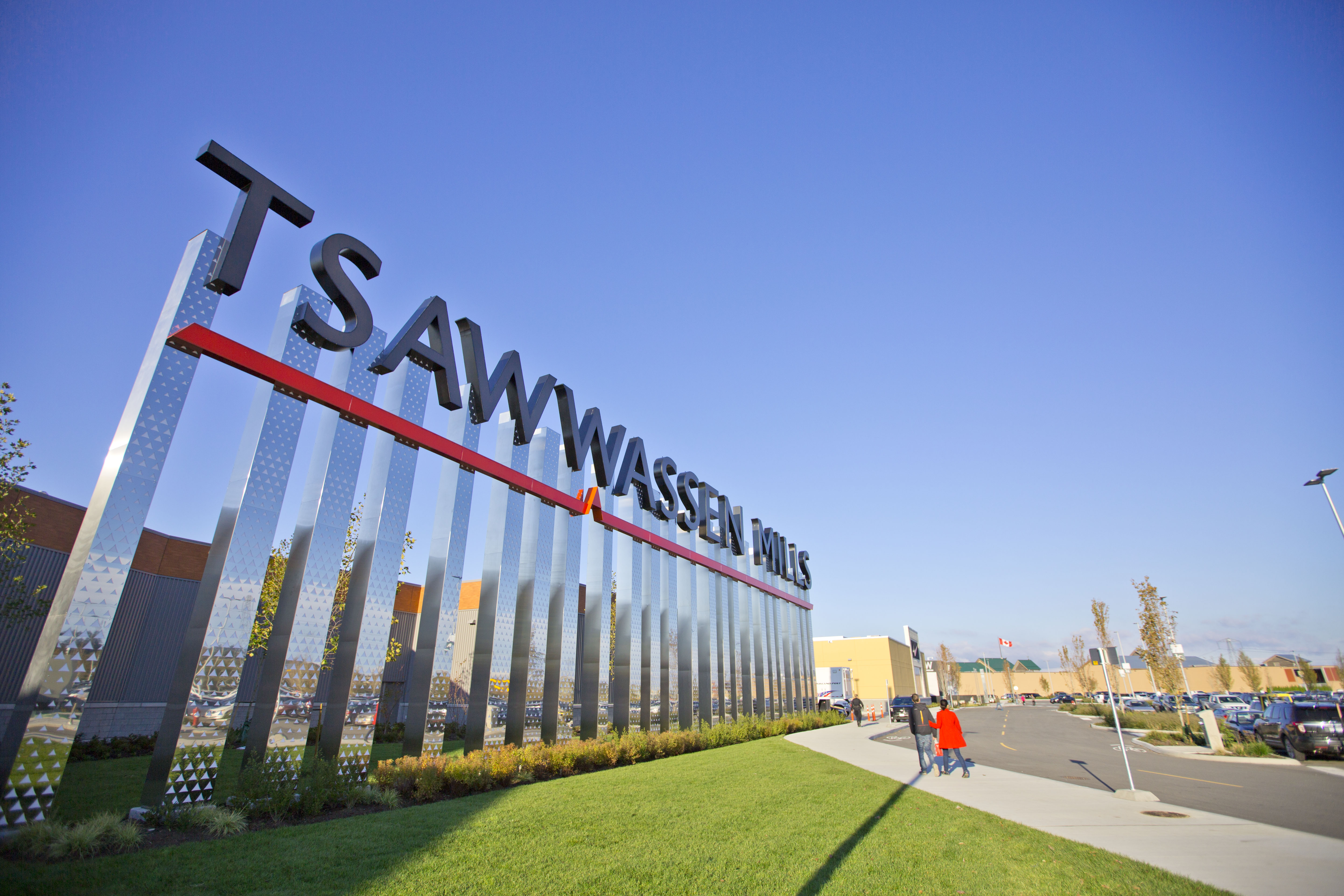
- Tsawwassen Mills Outlet
- Interactive map of Tsawwassen
- Coordinates: 49°01′N 123°05′W
- Country: Canada
- Province: British Columbia
- Regional district: Metro Vancouver
- City: Delta

Area
  - Total: 12.91 km^{2} (4.98 sq mi)

Population (2016)
  - Total: 21,588
  - Density: 1,672/km^{2} (4,331/sq mi)
- Time zone: UTC−07:00 (PCT)
- Website: www.delta.ca

Tsawwassen (English: /təˈwɑːsən/; Halkomelem: sc̓əwaθən) is a suburban, mostly residential community on a peninsula in the southwestern corner of the City of Delta in British Columbia, Canada. It provides the only road access to the American territory on the southern tip of the peninsula of the same name, the community of Point Roberts, Washington, via 56th Street. It is also the location of Tsawwassen Ferry Terminal, part of the BC Ferries, built in 1959 to provide foot-passenger and motor vehicle access from the Lower Mainland to the southern part of Vancouver Island and the southern Gulf Islands. Because Tsawwassen touches a shallow bank (Roberts Bank), the ferry terminal is built at the southwestern end of a 3 km (1.9 mi) causeway (part of Highway 17) that juts into the Strait of Georgia. Boundary Bay Airport, a major training hub for local and international pilots which also provides local airplane and helicopter service, is ten minutes away. The Roberts Bank Superport is also nearby.

To the northwest of the community are the lands of Tsawwassen First Nation ("TFN"), a people of Coast Salish ancestry who have used this land since at least 200 B.C. Having been stripped of their lands, rights and resources by European colonizers throughout the 19th century, and in accordance with a 2009 treaty with British Columbia, their territory now consists of approximately 724 ha (1,790 acres) of treaty settlement land, bounded by the Strait of Georgia on the west, the 2600 block to the north, the 4800 block to the east, and the 1200 block to the south. While also part of TFN lands, the 92-lot residential subdivision of Stahaken was leased for use by the (then) Tsawwassen Indian Reserve to Staheken Developments Ltd. in 1989 for a 99-year term. It was then developed in a partnership between Stahaken Development Ltd. and the Municipality of Delta. As such it is commonly thought of and serviced in the same manner as other subdivisions in the community of Tsawwassen. Stahaken residents are represented by the Stahaken Homeowners Association.

== Etymology ==
Tsawwassen is derived from the Halkomelem word sc̓əwaθən, meaning 'land facing the sea'.

== Location ==
Tsawwassen is on the northern end of a peninsula flanked by the Strait of Georgia to the west and Boundary Bay to the east. Boundary Bay is an important stopover for migratory birds on the Pacific Flyway. Tsawwassen has recreational access to Boundary Bay at Centennial Park, and there is an extensive bike/foot path along the edge of the bay, known as the Dyke.

Tsawwassen's southern boundary is the Canada–United States border, following the 49th parallel north. To the north, its nearest neighbour is the town of Ladner, which is also part of the City of Delta. Together, Ladner and Tsawwassen make up the area known as South Delta. Ladner is the site of the Delta Municipal Hall. Both the police station and hospital serve Ladner and Tsawwassen.

Tsawwassen's lowest elevation is just below sea level, and its highest is at 70 m (230 ft) at the Point Roberts border near 56th Street.

== History ==
Tsawwassen and surrounding lands are the ancestral home, and traditional lands, of the Tsawwassen First Nation, a Coast Salish people, who may have lived in the area for over 4,200 years, the age of the oldest archeological site found on English Bluff. Eight prehistoric villages have been unearthed there.

The first group of Europeans to see Tsawwassen was the expedition of Spanish explorer José María Narváez in 1791. Narvaez named the Point Roberts peninsula Isla de Zepeda and wrote that "there is an incredible quantity of rich salmon and numerous Indians... They speak an entirely different language."

European settlers cleared Tsawwassen's forests for agriculture in the late 19th century. Tsawwassen remained largely rural until the opening of the Massey Tunnel in 1959, which connected Delta to Richmond, and significantly shortened travel times to Vancouver. This caused a real estate boom in the area, and the rapid transformation of Tsawwassen into a suburban bedroom community within Metro Vancouver.

== Transportation ==
Tsawwassen is arranged in a grid, with streets running north–south and east–west. Running east–west are the avenues, with 1st Avenue closest to the Canada–US border. Running north–south, the streets follow the grid laid out for the municipality of Delta, part of the greater street grid set out by the British Royal Engineers in the 19th century.

Tsawwassen main arterial street is 56th Street, which connects Highway 17 with the exclave of Point Roberts, in Washington, U.S. (where it becomes Tyee Drive). It runs through the main commercial area, centred at the intersection of 12th Avenue with 56th Street. This border crossing is the westernmost on the 49th parallel between Canada and the USA.

Tsawwassen is served by buses from TransLink. Four primary bus routes serve the main bus loop at the South Delta Exchange next to the South Delta Recreation Centre, where many terminate at Bridgeport Station in Richmond: Routes 602, 603, and 604 operate during rush hour and connect directly to Bridgeport Station, whereas Route 601 operates all day/all week, and is routed past Tsawwassen Mills and through Ladner.

Route 620 connects the Tsawwassen Ferry Terminal to the Ladner Exchange and, ultimately, Bridgeport Station.

Local community routes in Tsawwassen are handled by Route 609 (Tsawwassen First Nation), Route 614 (English Bluff and Beach Grove during non-peak periods), and Route 619 (Boundary Bay).

Tsawwassen is also home to the Tsawwassen Ferry Terminal, part of BC Ferries. Ferries go to the following destinations:

Route	Destination
Route 1	Swartz Bay, Victoria
Route 9	Southern Gulf Islands
Route 30	Duke Point, Nanaimo

== Holidays and events ==
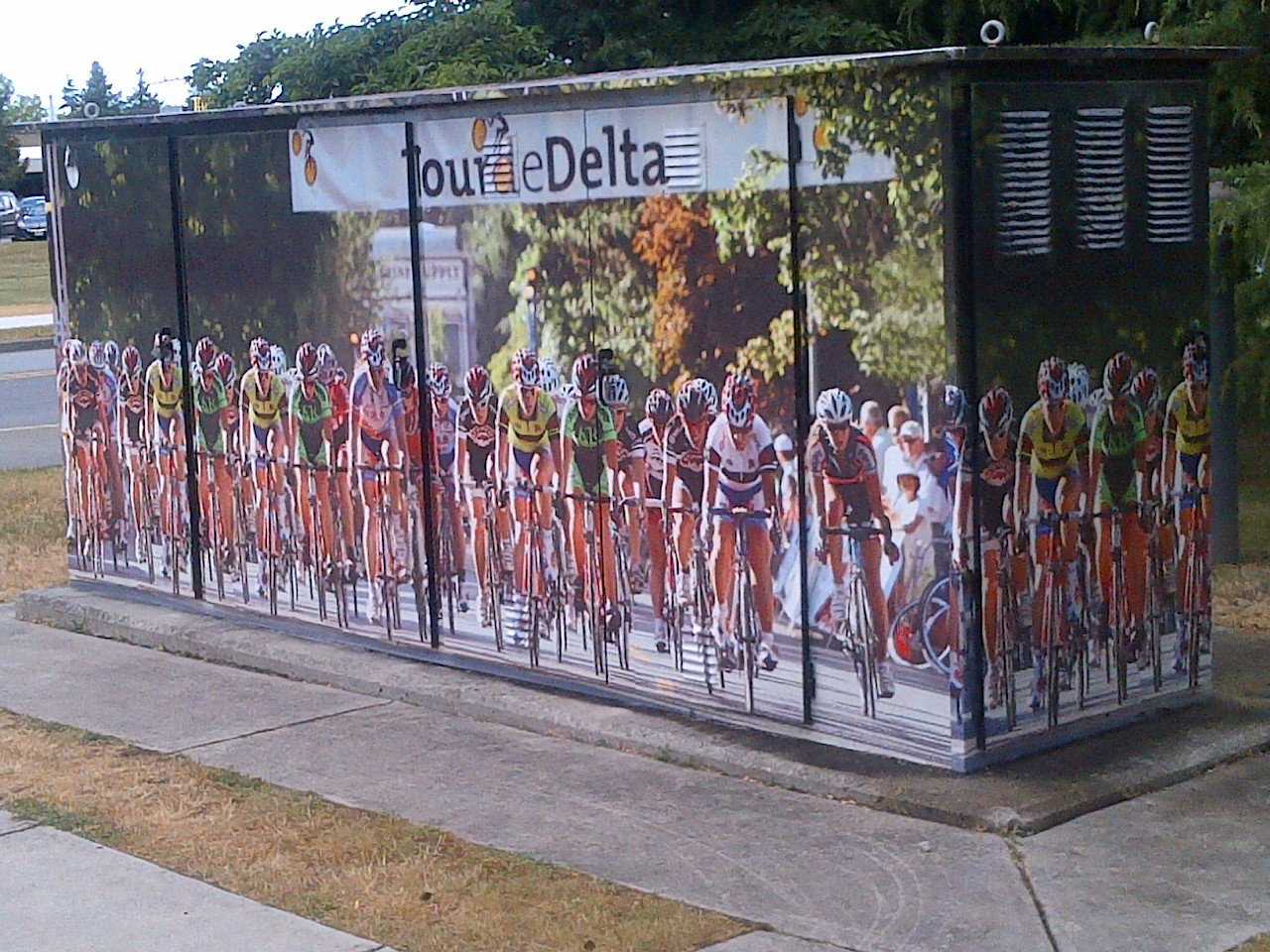
Tour de Delta wall cover on electrical box outside of Delta, British Columbia municipal hall

Since 2001, Tsawwassen has played an integral part of the Tour de Delta, one-day bicycle races that take place over a July weekend (The White Spot / Delta Road Race for men since 2001; and the women's since 2011). The weekend culminates in a race from North Delta through Ladner to Tsawwassen, where men and women do various laps around Tsawwassen's perimeter until finishing in either Diefenbaker or Winskill Park. The race grows in popularity and coverage each year.

The Tsawwassen / Boundary Bay chapter of Lions Clubs International runs a Sunday car lot in the east parking lot of Town Centre Mall, which donates the space. People selling their cars park them in the lot, where they can be seen by locals and people passing through on the way to Point Roberts. Dozens of cars and hundreds of shoppers now come from all over the Lower Mainland each Sunday.

In keeping with its reputation as the sunniest spot in the Greater Vancouver Region, every year on the August long weekend (for B.C. Day) Tsawwassen hosts the Sun Festival, which usually includes a parade, a live music, and a variety of activities such as children's games, food tents, and sporting events. There is usually a theme for each year's event, and attendees are encouraged to dress accordingly.

== Neighbourhoods ==
- Boundary Bay, a quiet beach-side neighbourhood situated on Boundary Bay between Boundary Bay Regional Park and the Canada–U.S. border. It originated in the 1890s as a seaside summer community for wealthy Vancouverites. Some of the original cottages still stand, many as renovated and updated homes, as well as modern contemporary single family homes and waterfront architectural residences. To the south, "The Bay" as it is referred to by residents, borders on the residential neighbourhood of Maple Beach in Point Roberts, WA. A Canada/U.S. customs checkpoint joined the two communities (at the foot of 67th Street) until it was closed in the 1970s. Currently, Boundary Bay Road as well as the newly opened Southlands boulevard provide the only two access routes to this area.
- The Southlands, which is a new neighbourhood centred around original barns, historic farm house, grange, and small shops extends from the Boundary Bay Rd and 3rd Ave roundabout ultimately to the USA border. It is bounded on the east by Boundary Bay community and to the west and north by protected farmland.
- Beach Grove, which is situated on the edge of Boundary Bay, further north from the community of Boundary Bay. It is located on the east side of 56th Street, between 12th and 17A Avenue.
- The Highlands, which is the area just to the northwest of Downtown Tsawwassen, behind the Town Centre Mall and situated around Highland Park.
- Pebble Hill, which is the area surrounding Diefenbaker Park and Pebble Hill Park.
- Tsawwassen Heights, a small area located on English Bluff Road, south of 1st Ave. Two totem poles stand on either side of the road here as its official gateway.
- The Terrace, a terraced subdivision located between 56th Street, the Tsawwassen Nature Reserve, and the Canada–U.S. border.
- English Bluff, which refers to the area along English Bluff Road, where many of the most expensive homes in the community enjoy commanding ocean views.
- Stahaken, which refers to a large area of houses built on land belonging to the Tsawwassen First Nations. This land is leased on a 99-year term to Stahaken Development Ltd., and supported and serviced by the Municipality of Delta. The current lease expires in 2089.
- The Village; adjacent to Stahaken, it is a wealthy subdivision built on the west side of English Bluff Road, overlooking the Strait of Georgia. Another totem pole stands at its entrance at Wesley Drive.
- Tsatsu Shores, a large apartment complex beneath English Bluff, on the shores of the Pacific Ocean. This is also built on land leased from the Tsawwassen First Nation.
- Imperial Village, a large subdivision located east of 52nd Street at 16th Avenue.
- Forest-by-the-Bay, which refers to a housing development off 56th Street and 6th Avenue beside Tsawwassen's only cemetery.
- Tsawwassen Springs, a small subdivision within the centre of the Tsawwassen Golf & Country Club.

== Schools ==
Public schools in Tsawwassen are part of School District 37 Delta. Tsawwassen has only one public high school, South Delta Secondary School (SDSS), formerly South Delta Senior Secondary.

There are five public elementary schools in Tsawwassen. These are Cliff Drive, Pebble Hill, South Park, English Bluff, and Beach Grove. A sixth school, Boundary Beach (Grades K-3), closed in June 2009. There is also a small French programme cadre school, Ecole Du Bois-Joli, for students with French language spoken at home.

Boundary Bay Elementary School, formerly located on 56th Street south of 12th Avenue, served grades K-7. With usually one class per grade, it was a small school, and shared a principal with Boundary Beach Elementary School. Grades 3–7 students from Boundary Beach were bussed daily to attend the school. The school was closed in the early 1990s, and the land sold. It is now a residential development. There was also a middle school called Tsawwassen Junior Secondary (TJS), but low enrolment led to its closure in 1994. This land was also sold by the school district and re-developed into a housing subdivision.

Private schools in the Tsawwassen area include Southpointe Academy, a private K–12 school; Delta Christian School in Ladner, a Christian private school offering grades K-8; and Sacred Heart Elementary in Ladner, a Catholic school offering grades K-7.

== Parks ==
Tsawwassen contains many community and regional parks; Boundary Bay Regional Park (home to Centennial Beach) is run by the Metro Vancouver Regional District (MVRD). The following parks are maintained by Delta Parks & Recreation, an arm of the municipal government:

- Diefenbaker Park – located at the intersection of 56th Street and 1st Avenue, named after former Canadian prime minister John Diefenbaker in 1976, prior to the park's completion in 1980. One of the largest parks in the area, it has many features – open spaces and large hills, a waterfall, dock, and pond, a very large forest, playgrounds, restrooms, and many gardens. The steep grade from the surrounding streets into the centre of the park makes it especially popular during Tsawwassen's rare snow falls, for sledding and tobogganing. In Summer 2011, the Rotary WaterWorks Playground was built. This water playground was created with environmentally friendly materials. The WaterWorks project was a collaborative partnership of the Corporation of Delta (now the City of Delta) and the Rotary Club of Tsawwassen. The concept draws on the history of the site, a former gravel mining operation that, at one time, supplied much of the gravel for the development of Tsawwassen.
- Pebble Hill Park – located west of 52nd Street between 2A Avenue and Milsom Wynd. This park features large fields used for sports (baseball and soccer), tennis courts built atop a pair of water reservoirs, and many forest trails.
- Fred Gingell Park – Tsawwassen's newest park, located on English Bluff Road just south of 3rd Avenue. It is named after the former MLA who represented South Delta in BC's legislative assembly. Built on a BC Hydro right-of-way, this park sits on the top of a high bluff overlooking the Strait of Georgia, the ferry terminal, and Vancouver Island. An observation deck is built on this bluff, and a stairway and trail have been built down the bluff to Tsawwassen Beach below. It is the first (and only) public access to the beach, creating controversy as semi-private beach access contributed a great deal to the area's property values. Locals, who hike up and down the steep stairs for fitness (often multiple times), often refer to the stairs leading down to the beach as the "Tsawwassen Grind" in reference to the Grouse Grind.
- Winskill Park – located at 56th Street and 9th Avenue, named after the land's donor and one of the first families to live in Tsawwassen. This is Tsawwassen's all-purpose sports park, featuring numerous baseball diamonds, soccer fields, and field hockey fields. A fenced artificial-turf outdoor soccer field was completed in 2007. Also features a walking trail, disc golf course, restrooms, youth centre, playground, and the Winskill Aquatic Centre.
- Dennison Park – located across from the high school at the corner of 53rd Street and 7A Avenue. This park used to feature an outdoor pool, but is now primarily used as a sports park for the high school football team. Also used for soccer and baseball. A forest grows on the northern half of the park.
- Village Park – a very small community park located on Wesley Drive at Skana Drive. Mostly green space, but also features a playground.
- Brandrith Park – another sports park, adjacent to Cliff Drive Elementary school, at the corner of 12th Avenue and Winskill Drive. The focus here is primarily on its baseball diamond, but a soccer field and tennis courts are present as well. A forest can be found to the rear of the park; a large playground can be found at the adjacent schoolyard.
- Highland Park – mostly open green space with a light forest, located at the corner of 55th Street and 13A Avenue, in the heart of downtown Tsawwassen.
- Grauer Park – another heavily used park, located at 56th Street and 18th Avenue. Greenspace here is minimal. The park is best known as home to the South Delta Rec Centre (featuring an ice rink, curling rink, and gymnasium). The Kiwanis Longhouse (once the South Delta library) is in this park, and is now an art gallery. Also featured here is parking for the Tsawwassen Park and Ride, the Tsawwassen Skate Park, and a lacrosse box.
- Jackson Way Park – a grassy greenspace, found at the southern end of Jackson Way.
- Beach Grove Park – mostly forest, found at the corner of Braid Road and 17A Avenue, adjacent to Beach Grove Elementary school. This park once featured a giant checker board and checker pieces visitors could play with. Also features tennis courts.
- Imperial Park – an open field underneath the BC Hydro right-of-way in Imperial Village, at the corner of Spyglass Crescent and Silverado Place. Features a baseball diamond, playground, and a decent hill used for sledding/tobogganing in the winter.
- Beach Grove Mini-Park – a very small community park on Beach Grove Court, featuring a small playground.
- View Crescent Park – a very small greenspace joining the southeast corner of View Crescent with the north end of Hunter Road, located behind a commercial complex in downtown Tsawwassen.

The following parks aren't officially recognized by the municipality, but still exist within Tsawwassen's boundaries:

- Wildwood Crescent Mini-Park
- Woodland Park
- Tsawwassen Nature Reserve

== Historic street names ==
- 1st Avenue – Summer Avenue
- 2nd Avenue (English Bluff Road to approx Murphy Drive) – Autumn Avenue
- 4th Avenue (52 Street to 56 Street) – Rawlins Road
- 6th Avenue – Allen Road
- 8th Avenue – Cemetery Road
- 12th Avenue (English Bluff to 56 Street) – Raitt Road
- 16th Avenue / Springs Boulevard (west of 52 Street) – Brandrith Road
- 16th Avenue (east of 53A Street) – Herd Road
- English Bluff Road – 48th Street
- 52nd Street (12 Ave to 28 Ave) – Imperial Road
- 56th Street (south of 12 Ave) – Point Roberts Road
- Arthur Drive / 53rd Street (north of 28 Ave) – Slough Road

And then there's historic Boundary Bay Road, which features the following streets:

- 28th Avenue (53 Street to 56 Street)
- 56th Street (28 Ave to 12 Ave)
- 12th Avenue (56 Street to Beach Grove Road)

From here, this connects with the segment of road that has always been known as Boundary Bay Road.

In the neighbourhood of Boundary Bay, virtually every numbered street here was historically named something else:

- 1A Avenue (65B Street to Centennial Parkway) – Mable Street
- 3rd Avenue (Boundary Bay Road to Centennial Parkway) – Gunn Road
- 4th Avenue – Montgomery Road
- 65B Street – Jordan Road
- 66 Street – Mack Avenue
- 66A Street – Old Cammidge Avenue
- 67 Street – Major Avenue
- 67A Street – Alexander Avenue
- Centennial Parkway - Hoffmeister Avenue

== Telecommunications ==
Tsawwassen, like the whole of the Municipality of Delta, was initially only serviced by Delta Cable (since sold to Eastlink) for TV and cable internet services, although Shaw and Telus now offer services as well.

As in all of British Columbia, incumbent telephone services is provided by Telus; the area codes serving Tsawwassen are 604 and 778 – though the latter is primarily used for cell phones. The original CO Code servicing Tsawwassen was 943, but as the population expanded, a new code, 948, was introduced in the early 1990s. New codes have since been added, and local number portability has blurred traditional exchange differences. Phone calls within Tsawwassen or the entire 604/778 region must adhere to the process of ten-digit dialing.

== Retail ==
Tsawwassen is home to the largest shopping centre in South Delta (Tsawwassen Town Centre Mall). In 2016 a new commercial business complex, Northgate, was completed, and construction began on the Southlands Market Square project; both developments of Century Group.

Tsawwassen Mills opened in October 2016 in the neighbouring municipality of Tsawwassen First Nation, located to the west of Tsawwassen, Delta, BC.

== Climate ==
Tsawwassen is known for its relatively dry and sunny climate compared with other locations in Metro Vancouver. For example, it receives nearly 40% (927.5 mm (36.52 in) from 1981 to 2010) less precipitation than downtown Vancouver (1,474.9 mm (58.07 in) at Vancouver Harbour CS from 1971 to 2000) and just over half of that of North Vancouver (1,805.6 mm (71.09 in) at North Vancouver 2nd Narrows from 1981 to 2010). It has a warm-summer Mediterranean climate (Köppen Csb) with cooler summers and milder winters than other areas on the Canada–U.S. border, and features some of the mildest winters and lowest diurnal temperature variation in Canada.

Climate data for Delta / Tsawwassen (Delta Tsawwassen Beach) Climate ID: 1102425; coordinates 49°00′39″N 125°05′36″W; elevation: 2.4 m (7 ft 10 in); 1981-2010 normals
Month	Jan	Feb	Mar	Apr	May	Jun	Jul	Aug	Sep	Oct	Nov	Dec	Year
Record high °C (°F)	14.5 (58.1)	15.5 (59.9)	19.0 (66.2)	23.0 (73.4)	27.0 (80.6)	29.0 (84.2)	31.0 (87.8)	28.5 (83.3)	28.5 (83.3)	23.0 (73.4)	15.5 (59.9)	14.5 (58.1)	31.0 (87.8)
Mean daily maximum °C (°F)	7.2 (45.0)	8.2 (46.8)	10.5 (50.9)	13.5 (56.3)	16.8 (62.2)	19.6 (67.3)	21.7 (71.1)	21.5 (70.7)	18.4 (65.1)	13.4 (56.1)	9.5 (49.1)	7.1 (44.8)	13.9 (57.0)
Daily mean °C (°F)	5.1 (41.2)	5.8 (42.4)	7.7 (45.9)	10.4 (50.7)	13.4 (56.1)	16.0 (60.8)	17.9 (64.2)	17.9 (64.2)	15.3 (59.5)	11.2 (52.2)	7.5 (45.5)	5.1 (41.2)	11.1 (52.0)
Mean daily minimum °C (°F)	2.9 (37.2)	3.3 (37.9)	4.9 (40.8)	7.2 (45.0)	9.8 (49.6)	12.3 (54.1)	14.0 (57.2)	14.3 (57.7)	12.0 (53.6)	8.9 (48.0)	5.5 (41.9)	3.0 (37.4)	8.2 (46.8)
Record low °C (°F)	−9.5 (14.9)	−12.0 (10.4)	−4.5 (23.9)	0.0 (32.0)	3.5 (38.3)	7.0 (44.6)	9.5 (49.1)	10.0 (50.0)	6.5 (43.7)	−1.5 (29.3)	−9.0 (15.8)	−11.5 (11.3)	−12.0 (10.4)
Average precipitation mm (inches)	134.6 (5.30)	80.4 (3.17)	78.5 (3.09)	67.9 (2.67)	52.2 (2.06)	42.6 (1.68)	30.5 (1.20)	28.7 (1.13)	39.8 (1.57)	101.3 (3.99)	145.1 (5.71)	125.9 (4.96)	927.5 (36.52)
Average rainfall mm (inches)	124.3 (4.89)	77.1 (3.04)	77.0 (3.03)	67.9 (2.67)	52.2 (2.06)	42.6 (1.68)	30.5 (1.20)	28.7 (1.13)	39.8 (1.57)	101.0 (3.98)	142.7 (5.62)	116.3 (4.58)	900.1 (35.45)
Average snowfall cm (inches)	10.4 (4.1)	3.3 (1.3)	1.6 (0.6)	0.0 (0.0)	0.0 (0.0)	0.0 (0.0)	0.0 (0.0)	0.0 (0.0)	0.0 (0.0)	0.3 (0.1)	2.4 (0.9)	9.6 (3.8)	27.6 (10.8)
Average precipitation days (≥ 0.2 mm)	18.5	14.3	15.5	14.2	11.7	9.7	6.2	5.6	6.7	15.2	18.8	18.6	155
Average rainy days (≥ 0.2 mm)	17.7	13.9	15.5	14.2	11.7	9.7	6.2	5.6	6.7	15.2	18.5	17.5	152.4
Average snowy days (≥ 0.2 cm)	1.6	1.0	0.5	0.0	0.0	0.0	0.0	0.0	0.0	0.1	0.6	1.6	5.4
Source: Environment and Climate Change Canada

== References in popular culture ==
=== In film ===
Due to being part of the Greater Vancouver area, which is the third-largest film and television production centre in North America after New York and Los Angeles, Tsawwassen has also appeared in numerous high-profile movies and television shows over the years. These include:

==== Shooting locations ====
- Shoot to Kill (1988)
- Bill & Ted's Bogus Journey (1991) – the indoor section of the Town Centre Mall was used for this film.
- The X-Files (1993–2002) – various episodes had portions filmed in Tsawwassen.
- Jumanji (1995) – all of the sequences shot at "Sir Save-A-Lot" were filmed at a former SuperValu store at the open-air Delta Fair Mall, which was located at the southwest corner of 56th Street and 12th Avenue. The space has since been demolished and replaced with the new Safeway (since sold to Save-On-Foods as of March 2014). An intersection near Diefenbaker Park was used for a scene of an animal stampede.
- Da Vinci's Inquest (CBC, 1998) Various locations
- Smallville (2001–2010) – various episodes were filmed in Tsawwassen, as well as just outside Tsawwassen on Deltaport Way near the Deltaport container port.
- Insomnia (2002) – the sequences filmed in the lodge in which Al Pacino was sleeping were actually filmed in an unused space previously occupied by the restaurants Timothy's, the Manor, and others. It is located at the northeast corner of 12th Avenue and 55th Street; it is now the location of Century Holdings, a real estate agency.
- X-Men: The Last Stand (2006) – the location of Jean Grey's childhood home is located in the subdivision of Imperial Village, on Golf Club Drive.
- Snakes on a Plane (2006) – the location of the illegal snake-dealer's greenhouse/barn is shot on the Tsawwassen/Ladner boundary near Deltaport Way and Arthur Drive.
- Are We Done Yet? (2007) – a portion was filmed on Pacific Drive near Wesley Drive.
- The Sandlot: Heading Home (2007) – filmed in Dennison Park
- Kickin' It Old Skool (2007) – an outdoor scene was shot in the Thrifty Foods parking lot (off 12th Avenue), and several indoor scenes were shot at the Tsawwassen Town Centre Mall (56th Street and 12th Avenue) and the Pacific Rim Performing Arts Studios in Century Square (56th Street and 18th Avenue).
- Juno (2007) – the scenes where Juno pulls over on the side of the road in tears were filmed along Deltaport Way near the 46A Street farm overpass; the "Summer" title screen is filmed at Diefenbaker Park.
- Battlestar Galactica – the final scene of the midseason finale, Revelations showed the remnants of a seaside city devastated by a nuclear war. It was shot on the Boundary Bay side of Tsawwassen, at Centennial Beach.
- Hellcats (2011) – Pharmacy scene took place at Wellspring Health.
- Child Bride (2019) – filmed primarily in Tsawwassen.

== Notable people ==
- Dylan Ainsworth, former lineman of the Saskatchewan Roughriders of the CFL
- Mike Dopud, actor, stuntman, and former running back of the Saskatchewan Roughriders of the CFL
- Irving K. Barber, industrialist and philanthropist
- Jason DaSilva, filmmaker
- Jerry Doucette, musician
- Brendan Gallagher, forward of the Montreal Canadiens of the NHL
- Harald Hasselbach, former lineman for the Denver Broncos of the NFL
- Brandon McMillan, forward of the KHL Medveščak Zagreb of the KHL
- Lochlyn Munro, actor, Riverdale (2017)
- Neil Osborne, vocalist in 54-40
- Brent Seabrook, defenceman of the Chicago Blackhawks of the NHL
- Ashley Spires, children's book author and illustrator

== See also ==
- List of place names in Canada of Indigenous origin
- Delta South
- Delta (federal electoral district)
