= List of Canadian Jews =

This list of Canadian Jews includes notable Canadian Jews or Canadians of Jewish descent, arranged by field of activity.

== Academic figures ==
=== Biology and medicine ===
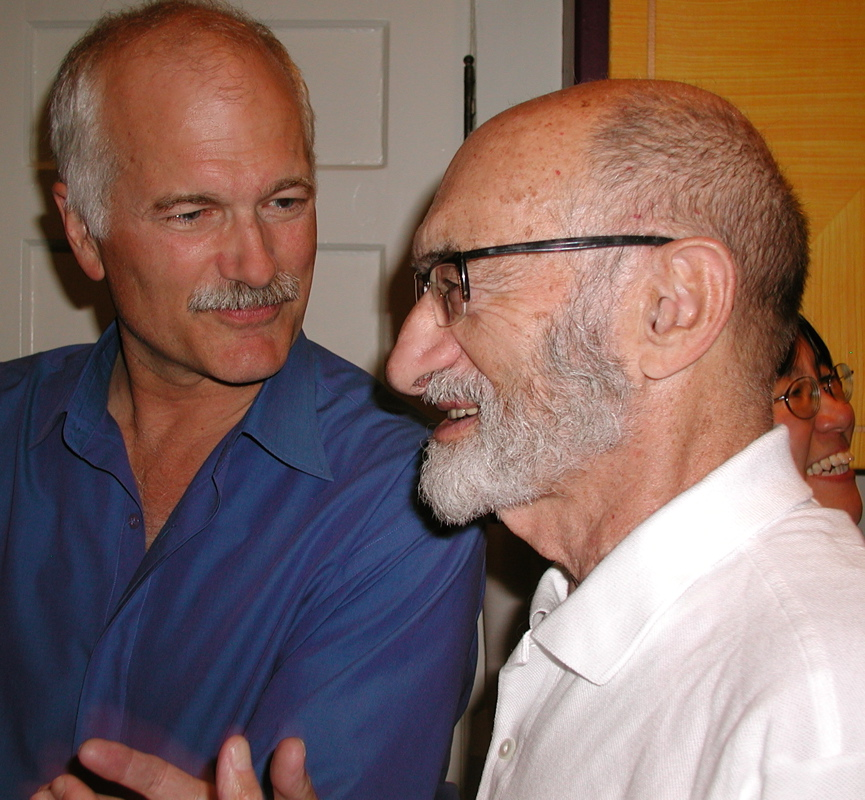
Henry Morgentaler

- Eric Berne (1910–1970), psychiatrist
- John Bienenstock (1936–2022), immunologist
- Daniel Borsuk OQ (1978– ), plastic surgeon
- Éric Cohen (1958– ), molecular virologist
- Max Cynader CM (1947– ), ophthalmologist and neuroscientist
- Dorothy Dworkin (1889–1976), nurse and founder of Mount Sinai Hospital, Toronto
- William Feindel OC (1918–2014), neurosurgeon
- Samuel Freedman OC (1928– ), clinical immunologist
- Phil Gold CC (1936– ), medical researcher
- Larry Goldenberg CM (1953– ), medical researcher
- Carl Goresky OC (1932–1996), physician and scientist
- Michael Hayden CM (1951– ), geneticist
- Sara Hestrin-Lerner (1918–2017), physiologist
- Abram Hoffer (1917–2009), physician and psychiatrist
- Charles Hollenberg OC (1930–2003), physician and medical researcher
- Harold Kaplan (1928–1998), psychiatrist
- George Karpati OC (1934–2009), neurologist
- Gideon Koren (1947– ), pediatrician
- Gabor Maté CM (1944– ), physician
- Harry Medovy OC (1904–1995), paediatrician
- Henry Morgentaler CM (1923–2013), doctor and abortion activist
- Richard Goldbloom CM (1924–2021), paediatrician
- Mel Rosenberg (1951– ), microbiologist
- Sydney Segal CM (1920–1997), pediatrician and neonatologist
- Louis Siminovitch CC (1920–2021), molecular biologist
- Nahum Sonenberg CM (1946– ), microbiologist and biochemist
- Ralph Steinman (1943–2011), medical researcher; Nobel Prize in Medicine (2011)
- Karl Stern (1906–1975), neurologist and psychiatrist
- Mark Wainberg OC (1945–2017), HIV/AIDS researcher
- Zena Werb (1945–2020), cell biologist

=== Computing and mathematics ===
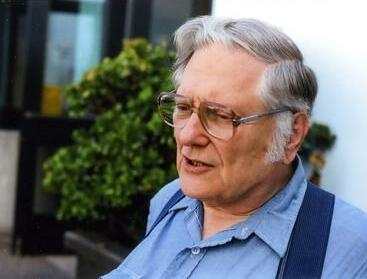
William Kahan

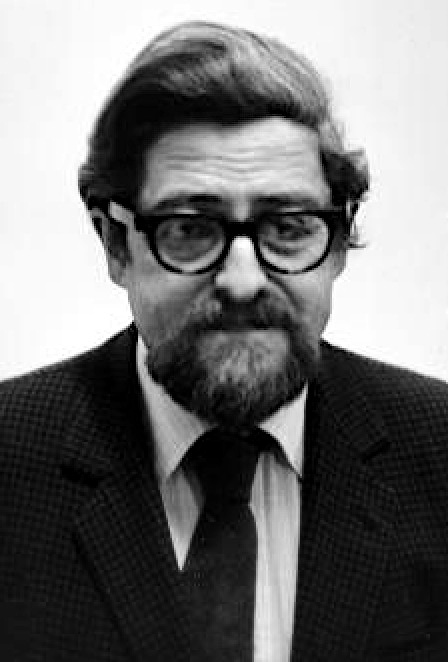
Louis Nirenberg

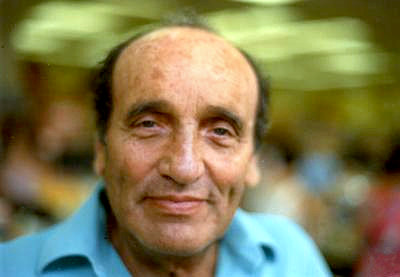
Irving Kaplansky

- Dror Bar-Natan (1966– ), topologist
- Yoshua Bengio (1964– ), computer scientist
- David Borwein (1924–2021), mathematician
- Jonathan Borwein (1951–2016), mathematician
- Peter Borwein (1953–2020), mathematician
- Nathan Divinsky (1925–2012), mathematician and chess master
- Ian Goldberg (1973– ), cryptographer
- Calvin Gotlieb CM (1921–2016), computer scientist
- Michael Gurstein (1944–2017), computer scientist
- Israel Halperin CM (1911–2007), algebraist
- Hans Heilbronn (1908–1975), mathematician
- William Kahan (1933– ), computer scientist and mathematician; Turing Award (1989)
- Irving Kaplansky (1917–2006), mathematician
- Yael Karshon (1964– ), symplectic geometer
- Cecilia Krieger (1894–1974), mathematician
- Nathan Mendelsohn CM (1917–2006), combinatorialist and group theorist
- Pierre Milman (1945– ), algebraic and differential geometer
- Louis Nirenberg (1925–2020), analyst; Abel Prize (2015)
- Anatol Rapoport (1911–2007), applied mathematician
- Robert Steinberg (1922–2014), algebraist
- George Zames (1934–1997), control theorist

=== Engineering ===
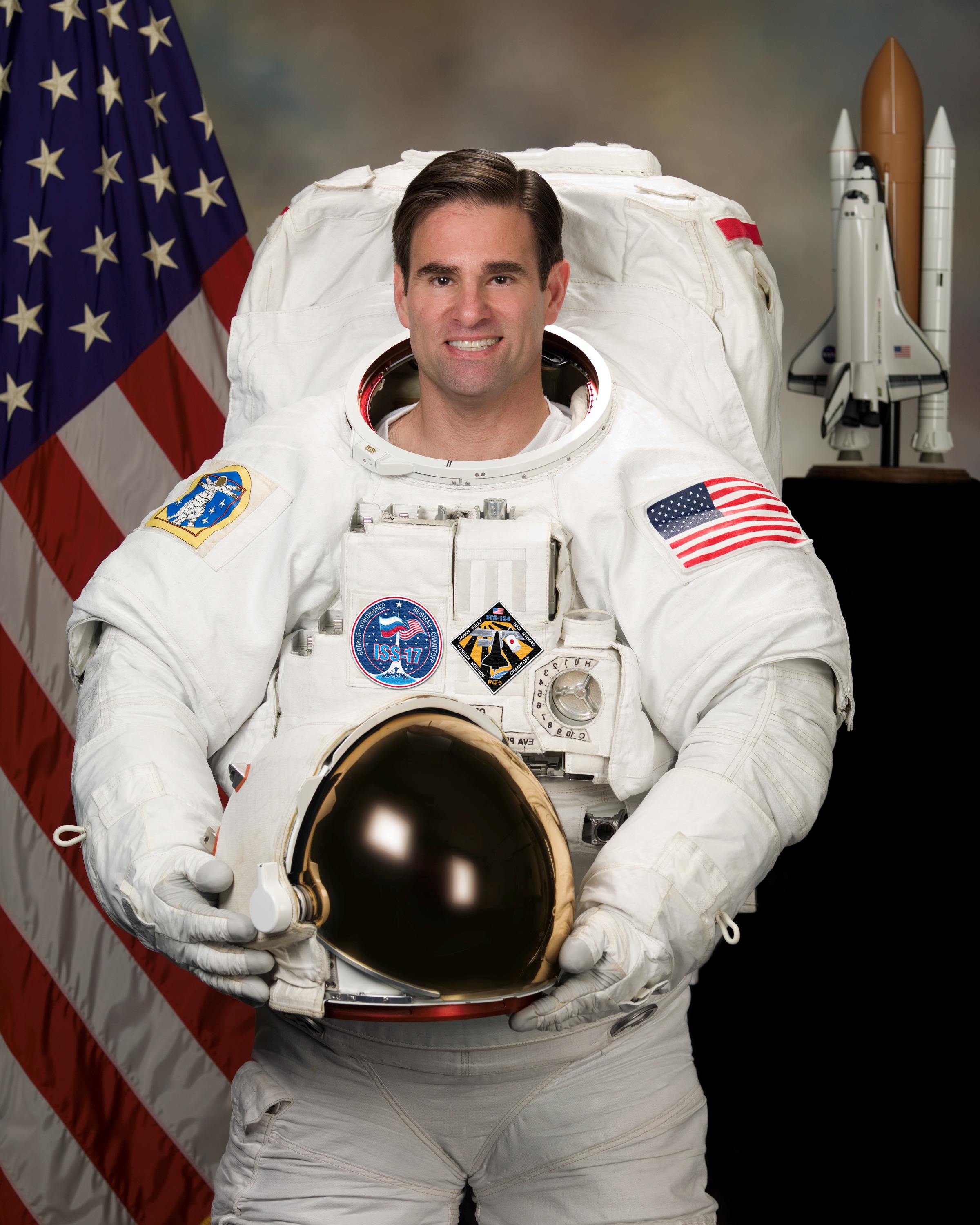
Gregory Chamitoff

- Norbert Berkowitz CM (1924–2001), engineering researcher
- Gregory Chamitoff (1962– ), NASA astronaut and engineer
- Valery Fabrikant (1940–2026), mechanical engineer and convicted murderer
- Charles Hershfield (1910–1990), structural engineer
- Josef Kates (1921–2018), engineer
- Leon Katz (1924–2015), biomedical engineer
- Cyril Leonoff (1925–2016), geotechnical engineer

=== History ===
- Irving Abella CM (1940– ), historian
- Norman Cantor (1929–2004), historian
- Natalie Zemon Davis CC (1928– ), historian
- David Feuerwerker (1912–1980), historian
- Jan Grabowski (1962– ), historian and writer
- Jack Granatstein OC (1939– ), political and military historian
- Ronald Hamowy (1937–2012), historian and political theorist
- Gabriel Kolko (1932–2014), historian
- Michael Marrus CM (1941– ), historian
- David Noble (1945–2010), historian of technology
- Derek Penslar (1958– ), historian
- Harold Troper (1942– ), historian
- Daniel Woolf (1958– ), historian

=== Humanities ===
- Gregory Baum (1923–2017), priest and theologian
- Leon Edel (1907–1997), literary critic; Pulitzer Prize (1963)
- Archie Green (1917–2009), folklorist
- Marvin Herzog (1927–2013), professor of Yiddish language
- Norma Joseph (1944– ), professor of Jewish Studies
- Barbara Kirshenblatt-Gimblett (1942– ), scholar of Jewish studies
- Allan Nadler (1954– ), professor of Jewish studies
- Adele Reinhartz (1953– ), professor of Biblical literature
- David Roskies (1948– ), literary scholar
- Abraham de Sola (1825–1882), professor of Semitic languages and literature
- Ruth Wisse (1936– ), professor of Yiddish literature

=== Philosophy ===
- Howard Adelman CM (1938– ), philosopher
- Gerald Cohen (1941–2009), political philosopher
- S. Morris Engel (1931– ), philosopher
- Emil Fackenheim (1916–2003), philosopher and theologian
- Raymond Klibansky CC (1905–2005), historian of philosophy
- Lou Marinoff (1951– ), philosopher
- Roger Nash (1946– ), philosopher
- Michael Neumann (1946– ), philosopher
- Jay Newman (1948–2007), philosopher
- Leonard Peikoff (1933– ), philosopher
- Hillel Steiner (1942– ), political philosopher

=== Physics and chemistry ===
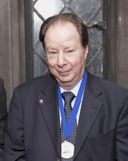
Sidney Altman

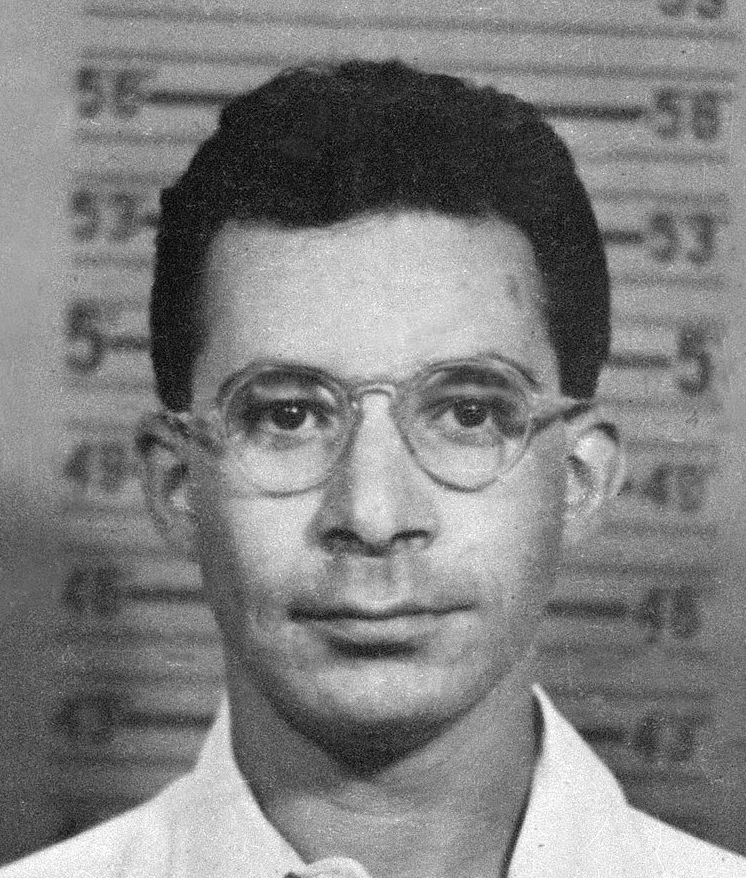
Louis Slotin

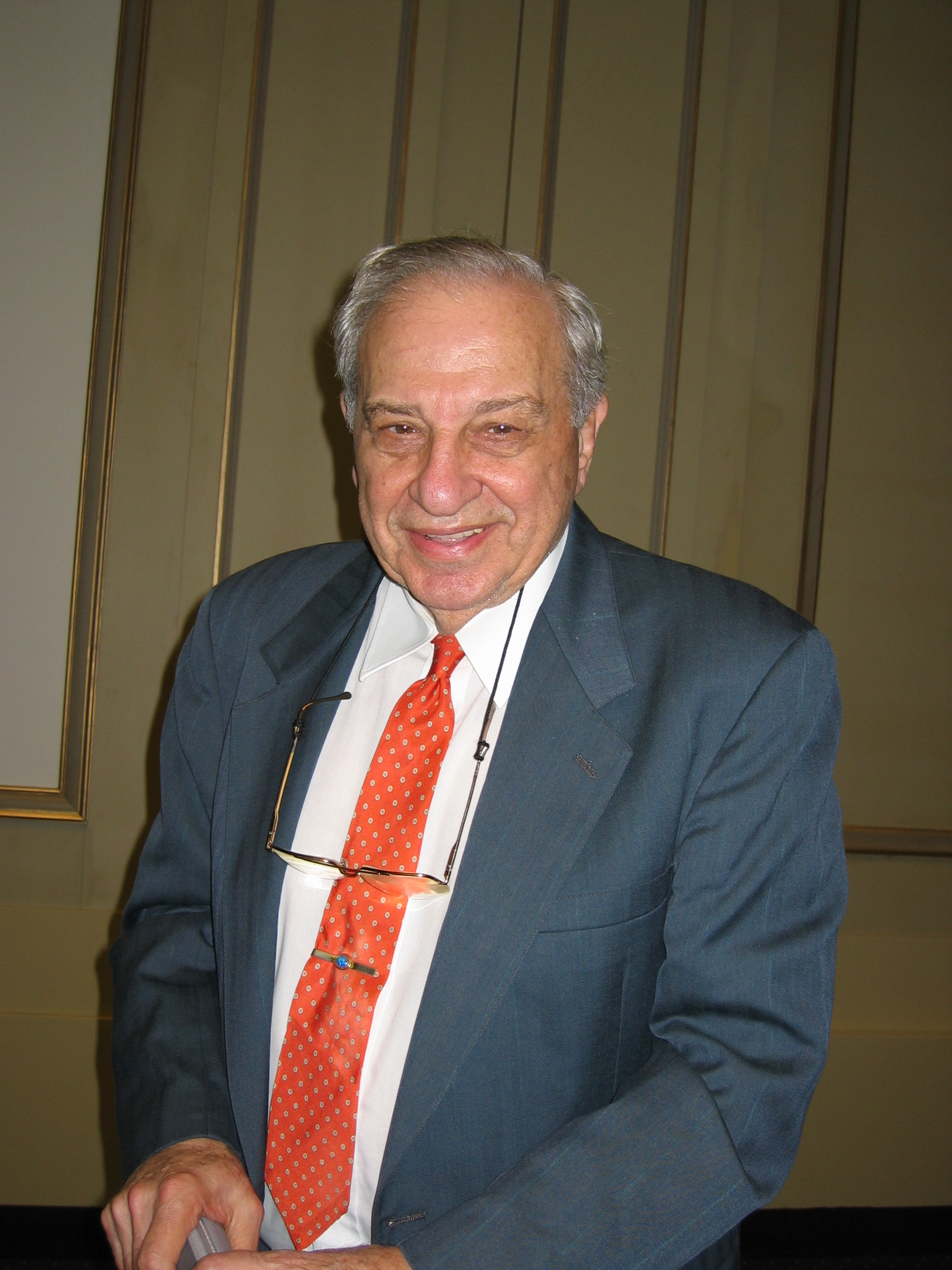
Rudolph A. Marcus

- Isaac Abella (1934–2016), physicist
- Sidney Altman (1939–2022), molecular biologist; Nobel Prize in Chemistry (1989)
- Alfred Bader CBE (1924–2018), chemist
- Myer Bloom (1928–2016), physicist
- Jacques Distler (1961– ), physicist
- Ursula Franklin CC (1921–2016) metallurgist and physicist
- Helen Freedhoff (1940–2017), theoretical physicist
- Stanton Friedman (1934–2019 ), nuclear physicist and ufologist
- Jack Halpern (1925–2018), inorganic chemist
- Shlomo Hestrin (1914–1962), biochemist
- Leopold Infeld (1898–1958), physicist
- Werner Israel OC (1931–2022), physicist
- Martin Kamen (1913–2002), chemist
- Leon Katz OC (1909–2004), physicist
- Victoria Kaspi CC (1967– ), astrophysicist
- Lawrence Krauss (1954– ), theoretical physicist
- David Levy (1948– ), astronomer
- Rudolph Marcus (1923–2026), chemist; Nobel Prize in Chemistry (1997)
- Maya Paczuski (1963– ), physicist
- John Polanyi CC (1929– ), chemist; Nobel Prize in Chemistry (1986)
- Juda Hirsch Quastel CC (1899–1987), biochemist
- Sara Seager (1971– ), astronomer
- Moshe Shapiro (1944–2013), chemist and physicist
- David Shugar (1915–2015), physicist
- Louis Slotin (1910–1946), physicist and chemist
- Joe Schwarcz, science writer and chemist
- Theodore Sourkes OC (1919–2015), biochemist
- Rudolf Vrba (1924–2006), biochemist
- Leo Yaffe OC (1916–1997), nuclear chemist and university administrator

=== Social sciences ===
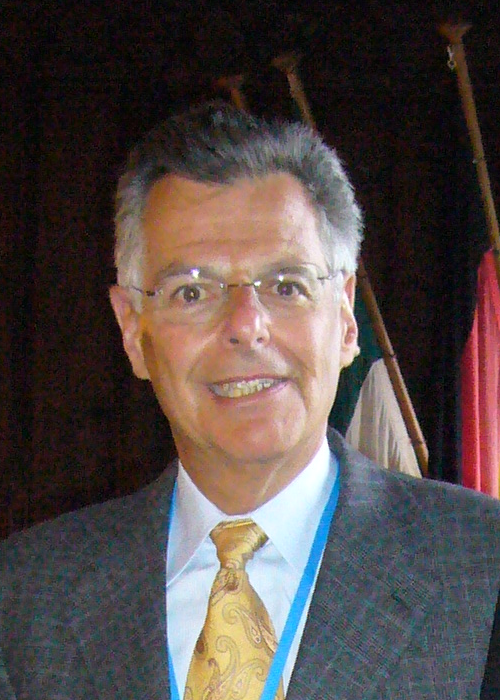
Myron Scholes

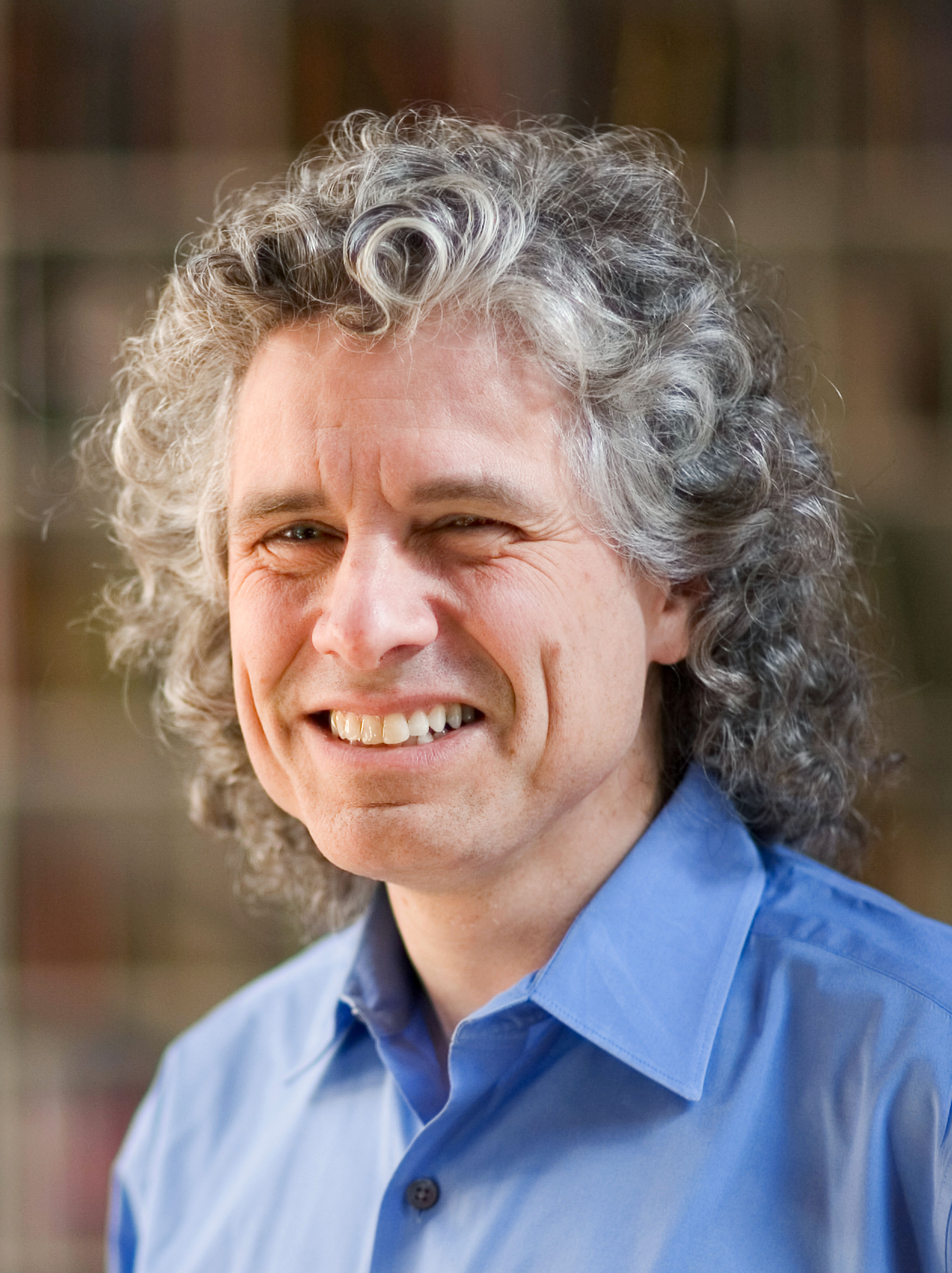
Steven Pinker

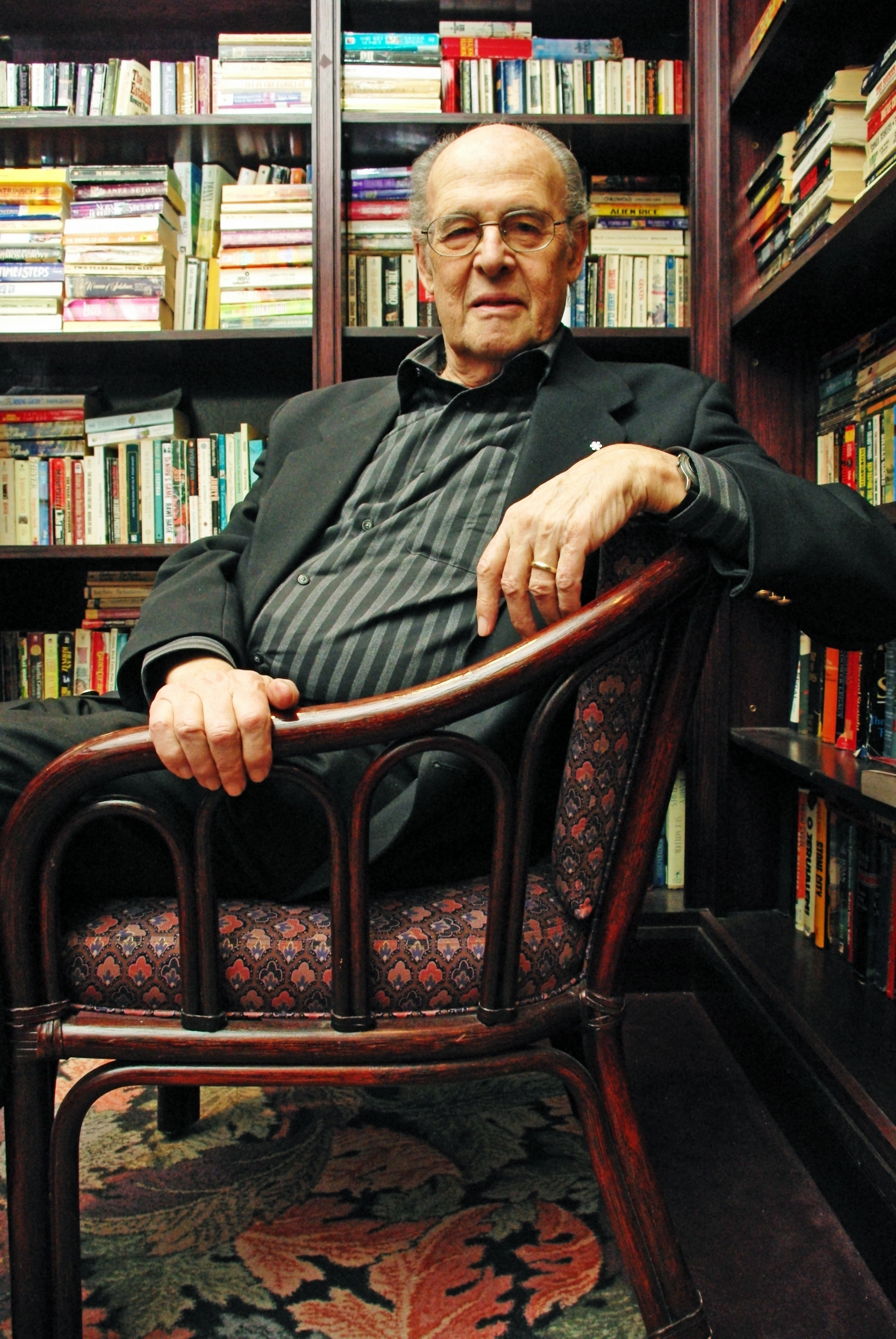
Ronald Melzack

- Bernard Avishai (1949– ), professor of business
- Ellen Bialystok OC (1948– ), psychologist
- Paul Bloom (1963– ), psychologist
- Reuven Brenner (1947– ), economist
- Michel Chossudovsky (1946– ), economist
- Stanley Coren (1942– ), psychologist
- Kurt Freund (1914–1996), sexologist
- Rochel Gelman (1942– ), psychologist
- Reva Gerstein CC (1917–2020), psychologist
- Erving Goffman (1922–1982), sociologist
- Myrna Gopnik, (1935–), linguist
- Ida Halpern CM (1910–1987), ethnomusicologist
- Samuel Hollander OC (1937– ), economist
- Gad Horowitz (1936– ), political scientist
- Helmut Kallmann CM (1922–2012), musicologist
- Ivan Kalmar (1948– ), anthropologist
- James Laxer (1941–2018), political economist
- Daniel Levitin (1957– ), cognitive psychologist
- Ronald Melzack OC (1929–2019), psychologist
- Henry Mintzberg OC (1939– ), business theorist
- Sylvia Ostry CC (1927–2020), economist
- Leo Panitch (1945–2020), political scientist
- Norman Penner (1921–2009), political scientist and historian
- Steven Pinker (1954– ), cognitive psychologist and linguist
- Susan Pinker (1957– ), psychologist and writer
- Frances Fox Piven (1932– ), political scientist
- Gad Saad (1964– ), evolutionary psychologist
- Myron Scholes (1941– ), financial economist; Nobel Prize in Economics (1997)
- Vera Shlakman (1909–2017), economist
- Lionel Tiger, anthropologist
- Jacob Viner (1892–1970), economist
- Kenneth Zucker (1950– ), psychologist and sexologist
- Shlomo Weber (1949– ), economist

=== University administration ===
- Isaac Hellmuth (1819–1901), founder of the University of Western Ontario
- Myer Horowitz OC (1932–2022), president of the University of Alberta
- Sheldon Levy (1949– ), president and vice-chancellor of Ryerson University
- Jack N. Lightstone (1951– ), provost of Concordia University; president of Brock University
- Frederick Lowy OC (1933– ), president and vice-chancellor of Concordia University
- Arnold Naimark OC (1933– ), president of the University of Manitoba
- Mordechai Rozanski (1946– ), president of the University of Guelph
- Bernard Shapiro OC (1935– ), principal and vice-chancellor of McGill University
- Harold Shapiro (1935– ), president of Princeton University
- Daniel Woolf (1958– ), principal and vice-chancellor of Queen's University
- Max Wyman (1916–1991), president of the University of Alberta

== Activists ==
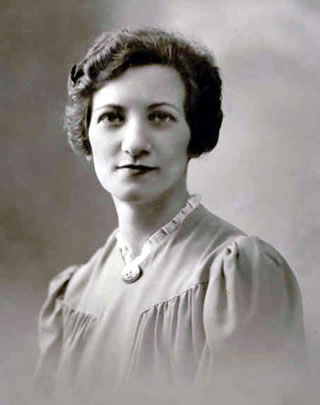
Léa Roback

- Manuel Batshaw (1915–2016), social worker
- Marjorie Blankstein CM, community activist
- Judy Feld Carr CM (1938– ), human rights activist
- Sabina Citron (1928–2023 ), activist and author
- Martha Cohen CM (1920–2015), community activist
- Betty Dubiner (1912–2008), disabilities activist
- Bernie Farber (1951– ), Jewish community leader and social activist
- Abraham Feinberg (1899–1986), human rights activist.
- Shulamith Firestone (1945–2012), radical feminist
- Ruth Frankel CC (1903–1989), activist
- Howard Galganov (1950– ), political activist
- Saul Hayes OC (1906–1980), activist
- Goldie Hershon (1941–2020), activist and Jewish community leader
- Lotta Hitschmanova CC (1909-1990), international development and humanitarian leader
- Kalmen Kaplansky CM (1912–1997), human rights activist
- Hillel Neuer (1969– ), executive director of UN Watch
- Judy Rebick (1945– ), political activist
- Dorothy Reitman CM (1932– ), activist
- Léa Roback (1903–2000), social activist and feminist
- Irv Rubin (1945–2002), Kahanist activist
- David Shentow (1925–2017), Holocaust educator

== Artists ==
=== Architects and designers ===
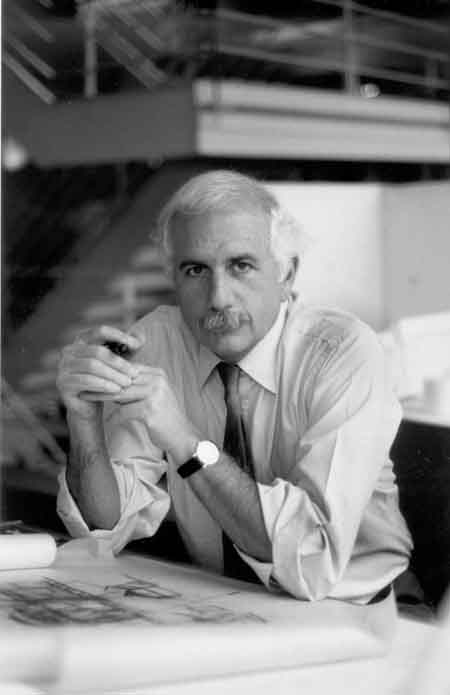
Moshe Safdie

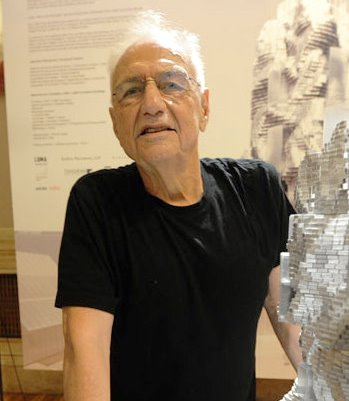
Frank Gehry

- Hans Blumenfeld OC (1892–1988), architect and city planner
- Benjamin Brown (1890–1974), architect
- Jack Diamond OC (1932–2022), architect
- Frank Gehry CC (1929–2025), architect
- Gregory Henriquez (1963– ), architect
- Phyllis Lambert CC (1927– ), architect and philanthropist
- Cornelia Oberlander CC (1921–2021), landscape architect
- Peter Oberlander OC (1922–2008), architect
- Mark Ostry (1960- ), architect
- Moshe Safdie CC (1938– ), architect
- Arnold Scaasi (1930–2015), fashion designer

=== Fine arts ===
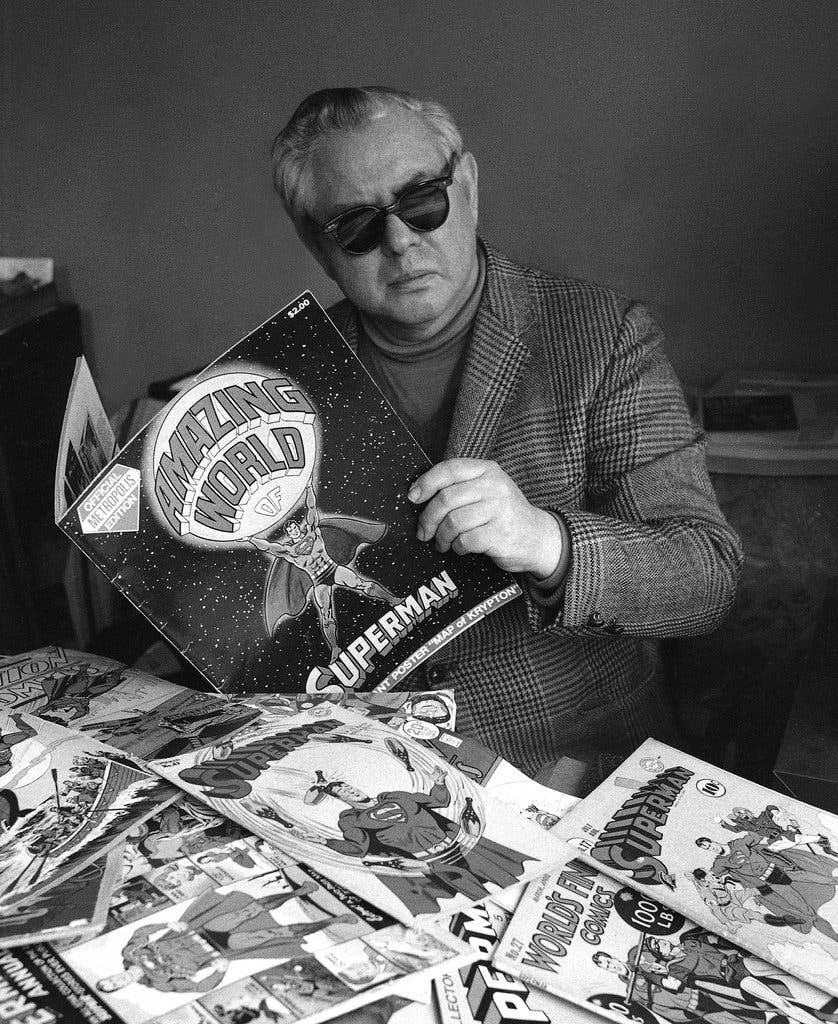
Joe Shuster

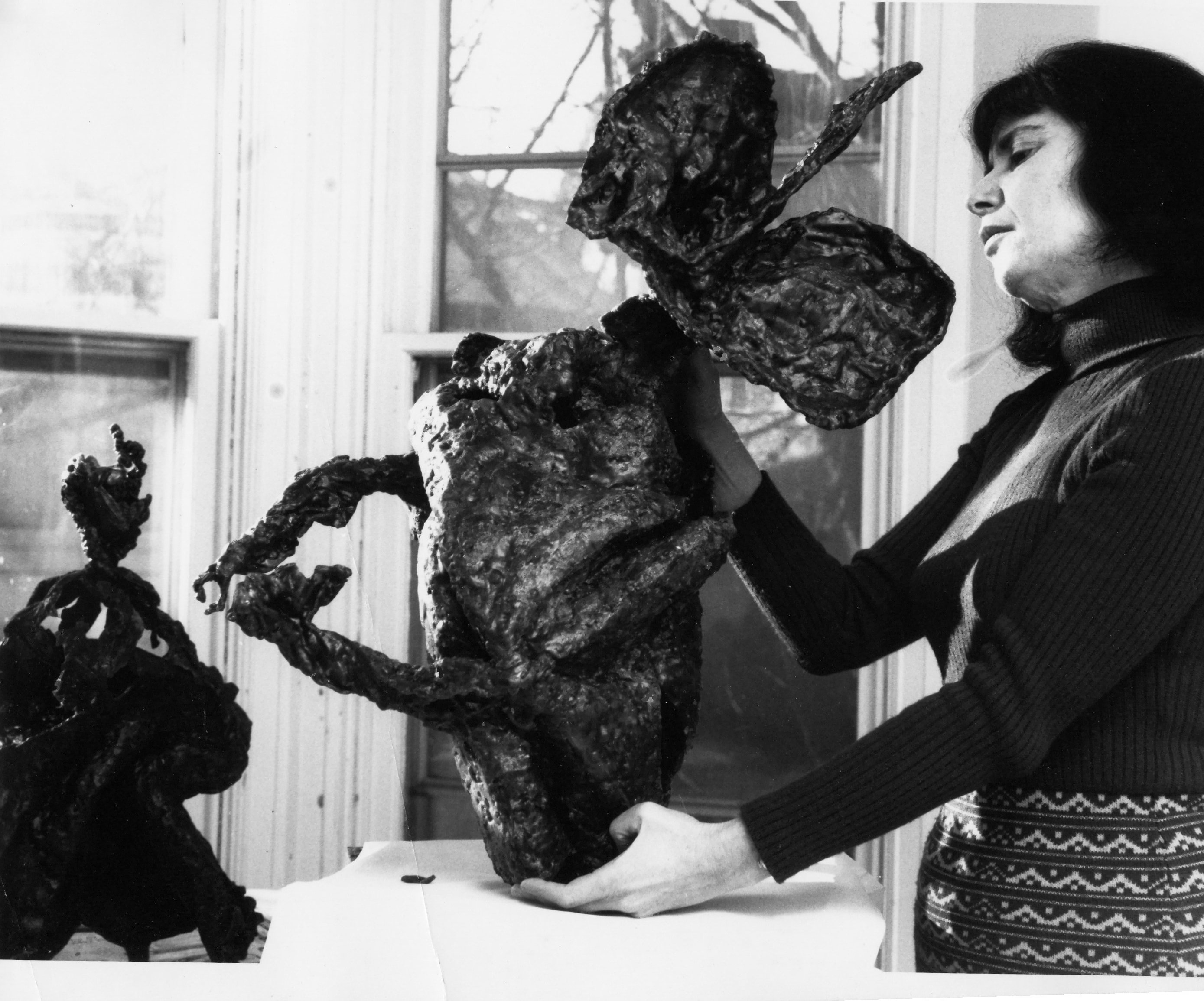
Sarah Jackson

- Omer Arbel (1976– ), sculptor and designer
- Aba Bayefsky (1923–2001), artist
- Arnold Belkin (1930–1992), painter
- Barry Blitt (1958– ), illustrator
- Sam Borenstein (1908–1969), painter
- Ghitta Caiserman-Roth (1923–2005), artist
- Lynne Cohen (1944–2014), photography
- Yehouda Chaki (1938– ), artist
- Sorel Etrog (1933–2014), sculptor
- Albert Gilbert CM (1922–2019), photographer
- Gerald Gladstone (1929–2005), sculptor
- Eric Goldberg (1890–1969), painter
- Jack Goldstein (1945–2003), multimedia artist
- Pnina Granirer (1935– ), painter
- Philip Guston (1913–1980), abstract expressionist
- Gilah Yelin Hirsch (1944– ), artist
- Eli Ilan (1928–1982), sculptor
- Gershon Iskowitz (1921–1988), artist
- Sarah Jackson (1924–2004), artist
- Mayer Kirshenblatt (1916–2009), painter
- Sylvia Lefkovitz (1924–1987), painter and sculptor
- Stanley Lewis (1930–2006), sculptor
- Harry Mayerovitch (1910–2004), artist and architect
- Louis Muhlstock (1904–2001), painter
- Henry Orenstein (1918–2008), painter
- Alfred Pinsky (1921–1999), painter
- David Rabinowitch (1943– ), sculptor
- Royden Rabinowitch OC (1943– ), sculptor
- William Raphael (1833–1914), painter
- Meyer Ryshpan (1898-1985), painter
- Miriam Schapiro (1923–2015), artist
- Regina Seiden (1897–1991), painter
- Yechiel Shainblum, (died 1987), painter and sculptor
- Joe Shuster (1914–1992), co-creator of Superman
- Erik Slutsky (1953– ), painter
- Max Stern (1904–1987), art dealer
- Avrom Yanovsky (1911–1979), cartoonist

== Business ==
=== Finance ===
- Mitch Garber (1964–), investor and business executive
- Sol Kanee OC (1909–2007), banker and Jewish community leader
- Alvin Libin OC (1931– ), investor and co-owner of Calgary Sports and Entertainment
- Lazarus Phillips OBE (1895 –1986), director of the Royal Bank of Canada and senator
- Louis Rasminsky CC (1908–1998), Governor of Bank of Canada
- Jeff Rubin (1954– ), chief economist of CIBC World Markets
- Gerry Schwartz OC (1941– ), CEO of Onex Corporation
- Alex Shnaider (1968– ), co-founder of the Midland Group
- Lawrence Stroll (1959– ), investor
- Mark Wiseman (1970– ) CEO of the CPP Investment Board

=== Media ===
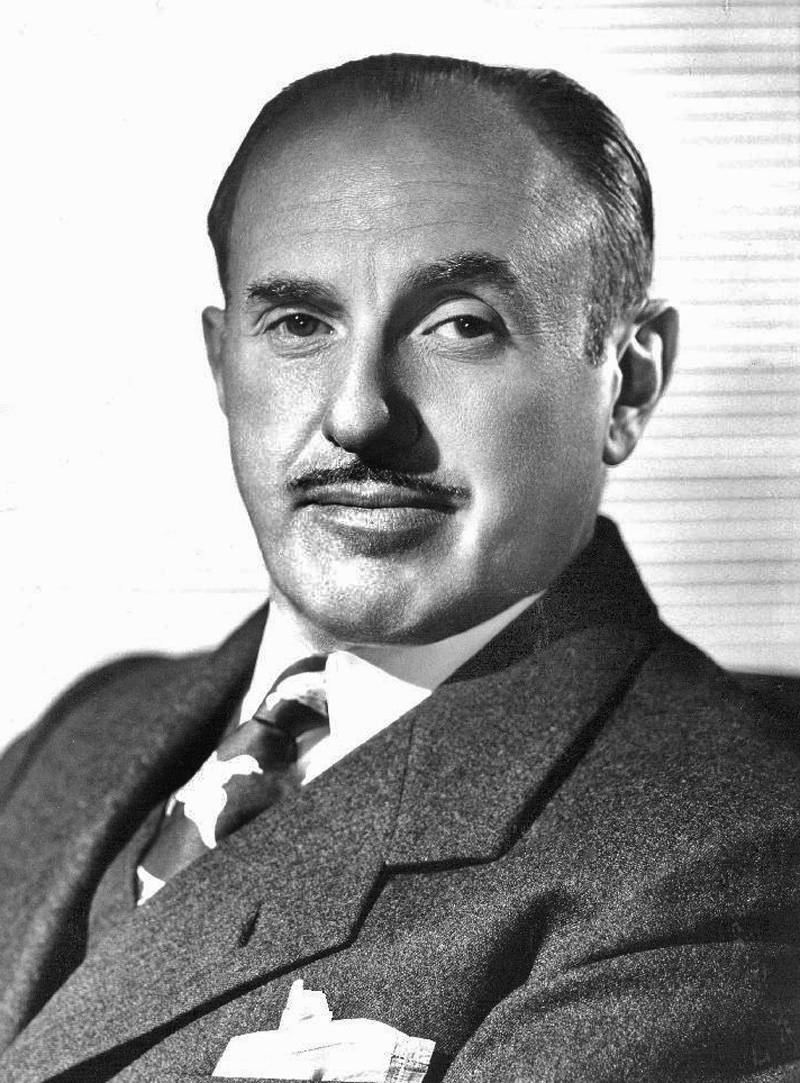
Jack L. Warner

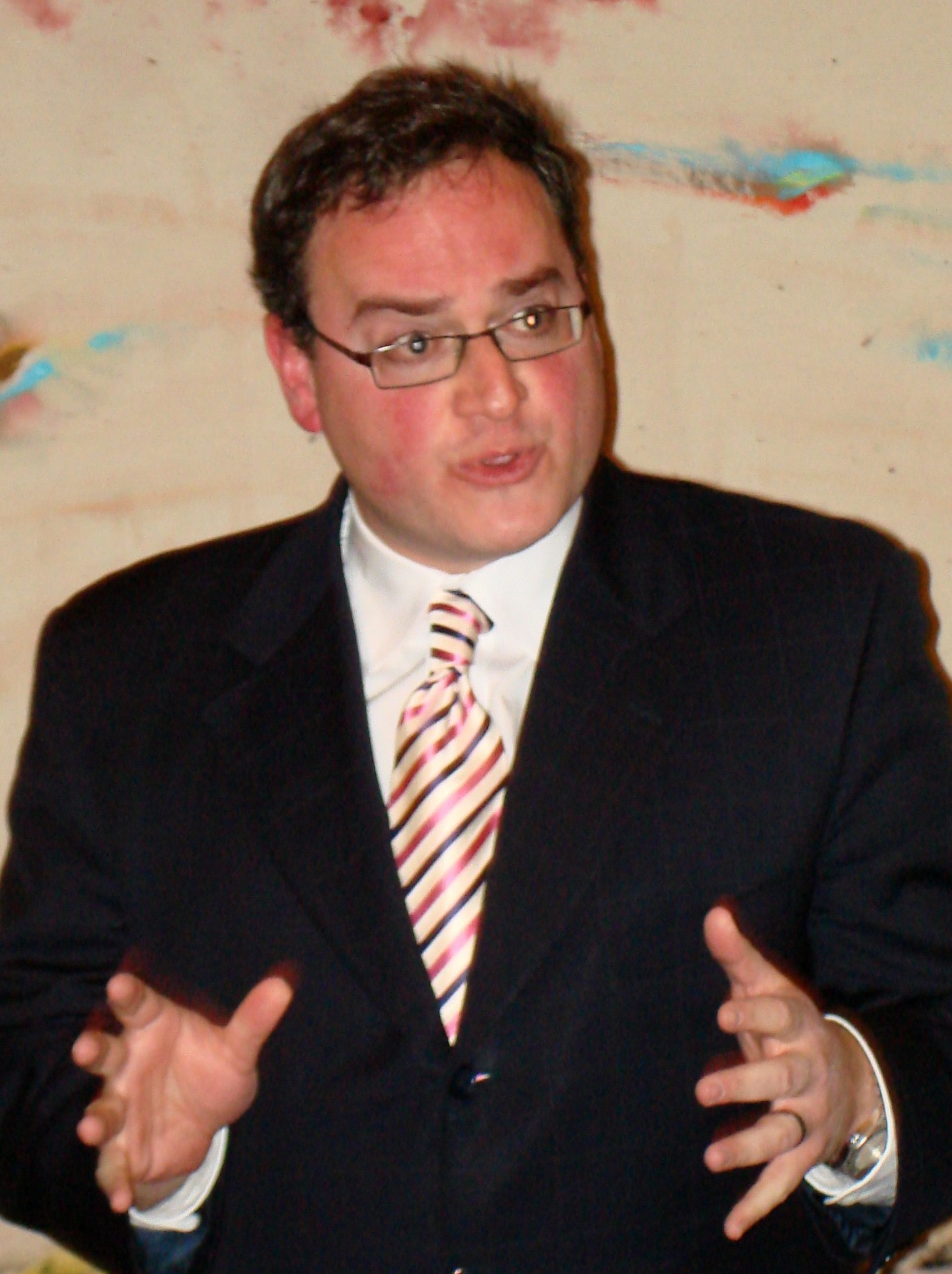
Ezra Levant

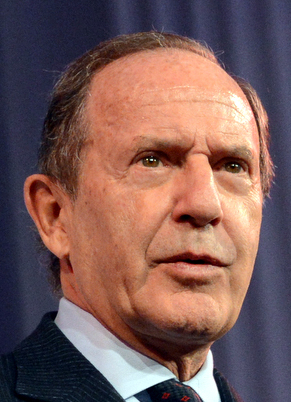
Mortimer Zuckerman

- Izzy Asper OC (1932–2003), chairman of Canwest Global Communications
- Leonard Asper (1964– ), president and CEO of Canwest Global Communications
- Avie Bennett CC (1928–2017), chairman of McClelland & Stewart
- Jacques Bensimon CM (1943–2012), director of the National Film Board of Canada
- Mark Breslin CM (1952– ), co-founder of Yuk Yuk's
- Edgar Bronfman Jr. (1955– ), CEO and chairman of Warner Music Group
- Paul Godfrey CM (1939– ), president and CEO of Postmedia Network
- Michael Goldbloom CM (1953– ), president of Star Media Group
- Ian Greenberg (1942– ), co-founder and CEO of Astral Media
- Michael Hirsh (1948– ), co-founder of Nelvana
- Mel Hurtig OC (1932–2016), publisher
- Jonathan Kay (1968– ), editor-in-chief of The Walrus
- Ezra Levant (1972– ), political commentator and founder of Rebel News
- David Margolese (1957– ), founder of Sirius XM Radio
- Louis B. Mayer (1884–1957), co-founder of Metro-Goldwyn-Mayer Studios
- Andy Nulman OC (1959– ), co-founder of Just for Laughs
- M. J. Nurenberger (1911–2001), founder of the Canadian Jewish News
- Bernard Ostry CC (1927–2006), chair and CEO of TVOntario
- Robert Rabinovitch (1943– ), president and CEO of the Canadian Broadcasting Corporation
- A. M. Rosenthal (1922–2006), executive editor of The New York Times; Pulitzer Prize (1960)
- Brian Segal (1943– ), president and CEO of Rogers Publishing
- Jay Switzer CM (1956–2018), president and CEO of CHUM Limited
- Jack L. Warner (1892–1978), president of Warner Bros. Studios
- Moses Znaimer (1942– ), co-founder and head of Citytv
- Mortimer Zuckerman (1937– ), co-founder of Boston Properties and media proprietor

=== Natural resources ===
- Robert Friedland (1950– ), founder of Ivanhoe Mines
- Leon Joseph Koerner (1892–1972), philanthropist and industrialist
- Peter Munk CC (1927–2018), founder of Barrick Gold
- Joseph Rotman OC (1935–2015), businessman and philanthropist
- Seymour Schulich OC (1940– ), mining businessman and philanthropist
- Irving Schwartz OC (1929–2010), entrepreneur and philanthropist
- Levy Solomons (1730–1792), merchant and fur trader

=== Philanthropists ===
- Bluma Appel OC (1919–2007), philanthropist
- Jenny Belzberg CM (1928– ), philanthropist
- Alfred David Benjamin (1848–1900), businessman and philanthropist
- Lillian Bilsky Freiman OBE (1885–1940), philanthropist and civil leader
- Ruth Goldbloom OC (1923–2012), co-founder of Pier 21

=== Real estate ===
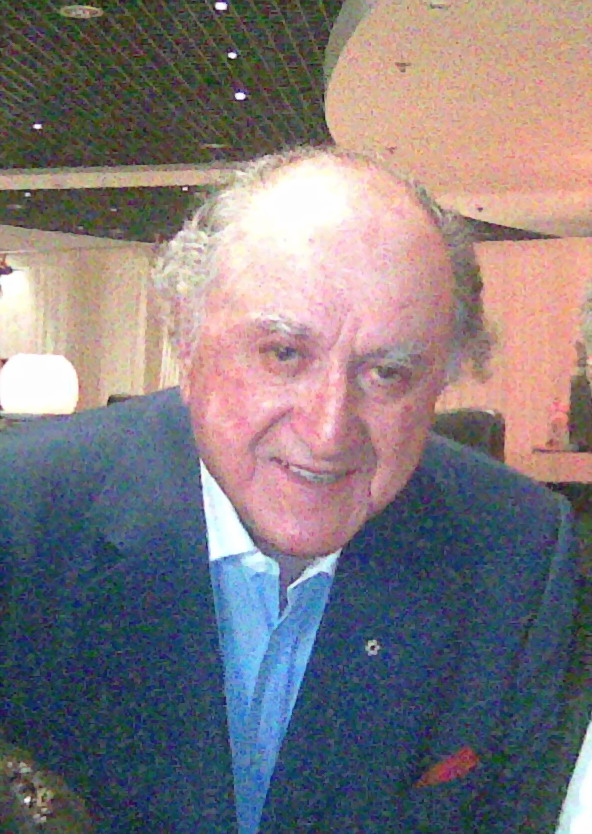
David Azrieli

- Marcel Adams (1920–2020), real estate investor
- Sylvan Adams (1958– ), real estate investor
- David Azrieli CM (1922–2014), real estate magnate
- Samuel Belzberg OC (1928–2018), businessman
- The Ghermezian family, shopping mall developers
- Mitchell Goldhar (1962– ), founder of SmartCentres and owner of Maccabi Tel Aviv F.C.
- Michal Hornstein CM (1920–2016), businessman and philanthropist
- The Reichmann family, real estate magnates
  - Edward Reichmann (1925–2005), real estate magnate
  - Paul Reichmann (1930–2013), real estate magnate
- Jack Singer (1917–2013), real estate developer
- Allan Zeman GBM (1949– ), developer

=== Retail ===
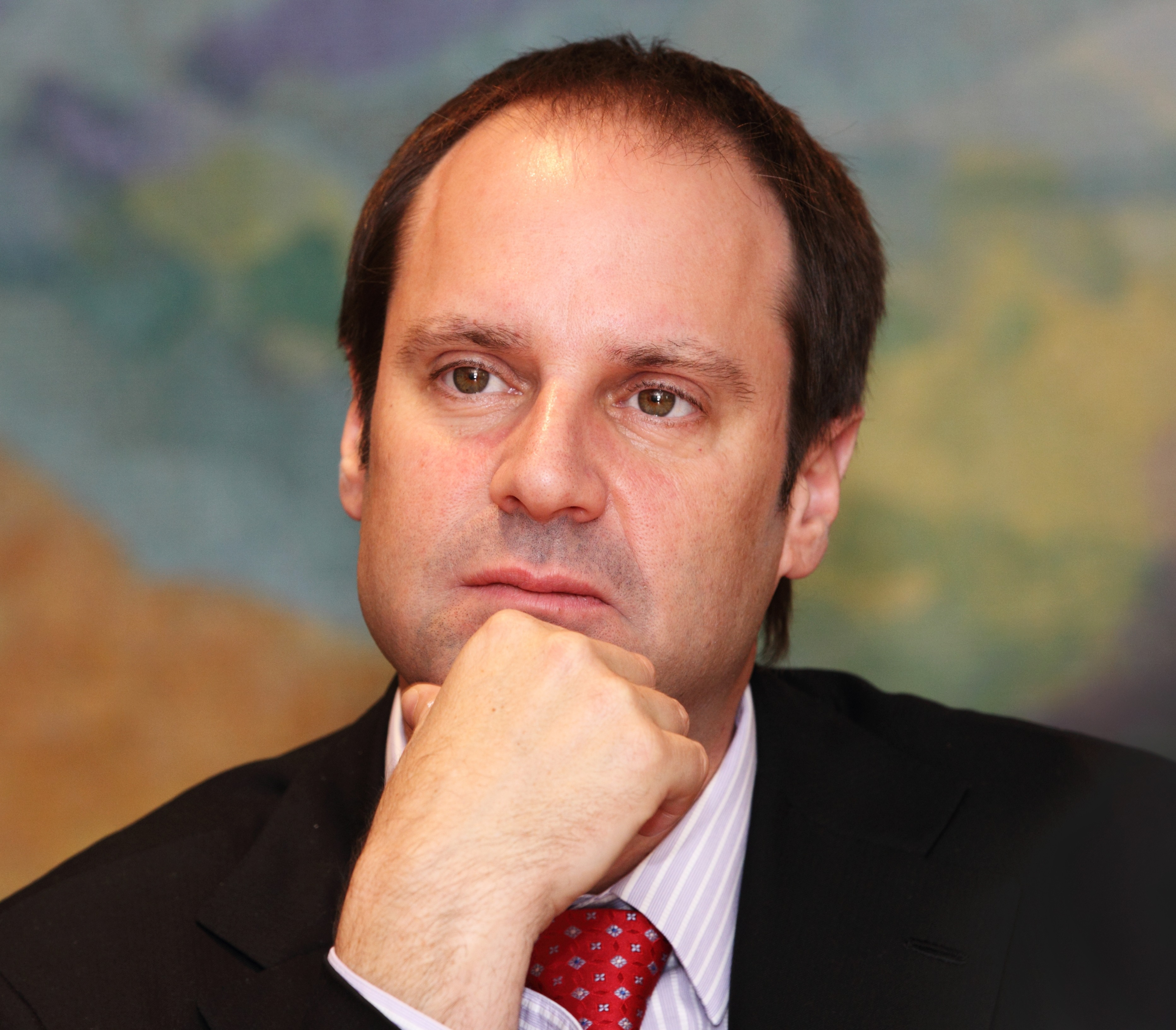
Jeffrey Skoll

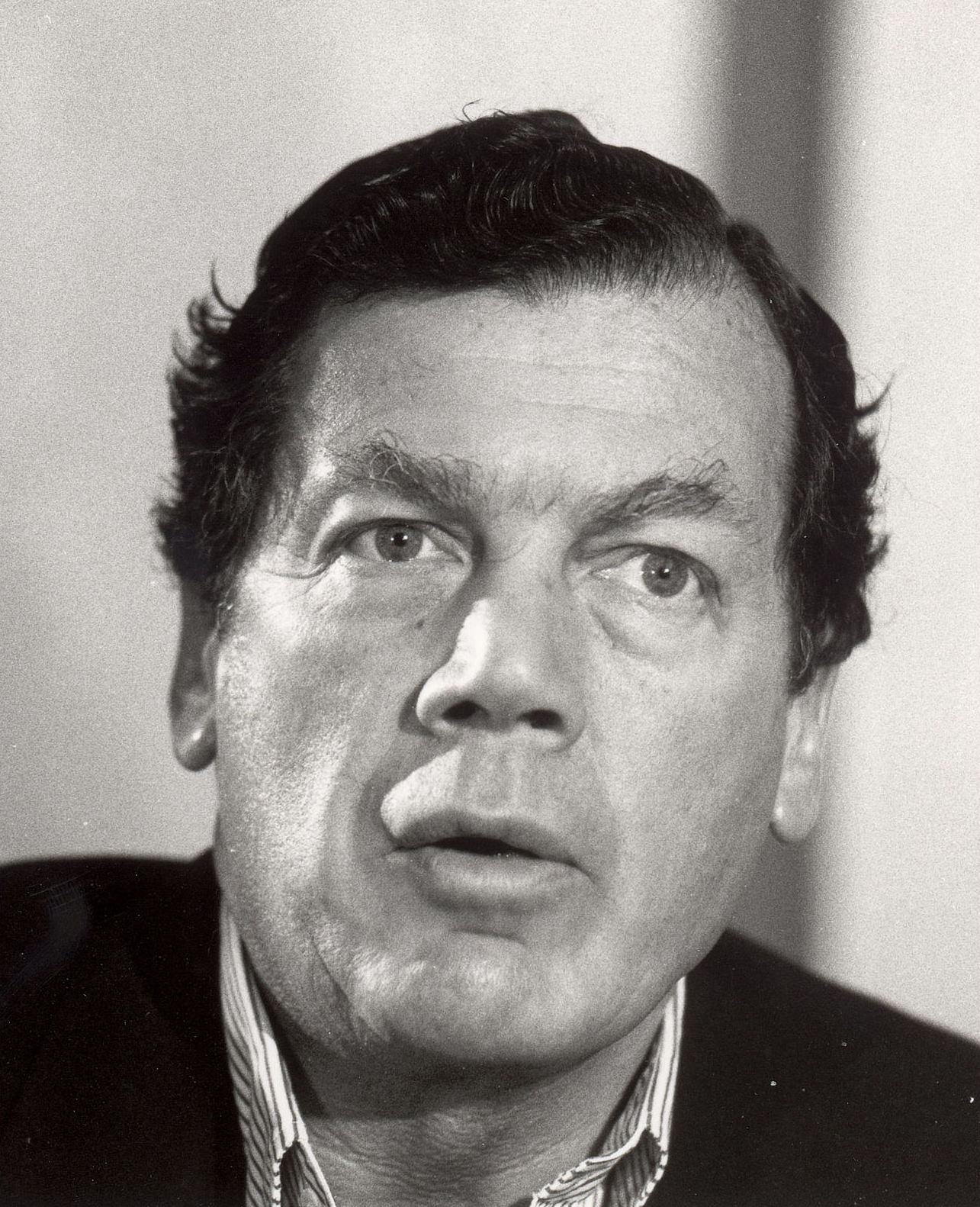
Edgar Bronfman Sr.

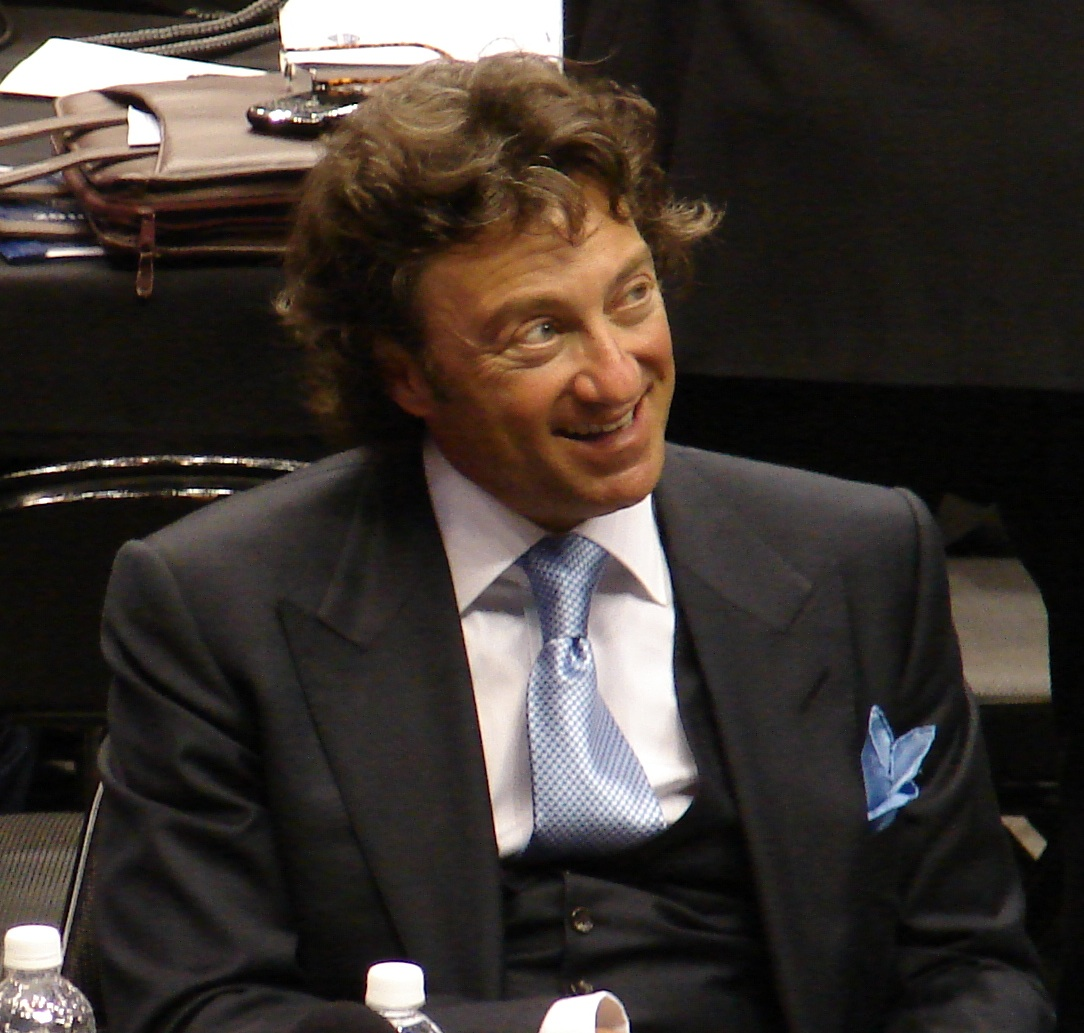
Daryl Katz

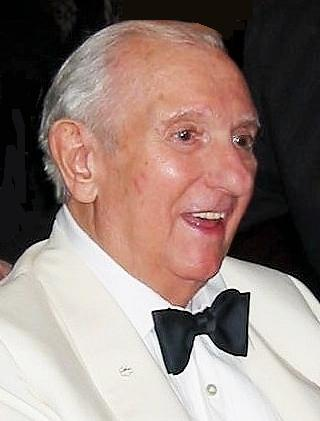
Ed Mirvish

- Aldo Bensadoun (1939– ), founder of the Aldo Group
- The Bronfman family, businesspeople and philanthropists
  - Charles Bronfman CC (1931– ), co-chairman of Seagram's
  - Edgar Bronfman Sr. (1929–2013), head of Seagram's and president of the World Jewish Congress
  - Samuel Bronfman CC (1889–1971), founder of Seagram's
- Dov Charney (1969– ), founder of American Apparel
- Lyon Cohen (1868–1937), businessman and philanthropist
- George Cohon OC (1937– ), founder of McDonald's Canada
- Nathan Cummings (1896–1985), co-founder of Consolidated Foods
- Leslie Dan CM (1929– ), founder of Novopharm
- Sir Mortimer Davis (1866–1928), tobacco industry executive
- Archibald Jacob Freiman (1880–1944), founder of Freimans
- Hershey Friedman (1950– ), owner of Agri Star
- Daniel Friedmann (1956– ), CEO of MacDonald, Dettwiler and Associates
- Daryl Katz (1961– ), founder of Katz Group of Companies and owner of the Edmonton Oilers
- Murray Koffler OC (1924–2017), founder of Shoppers Drug Mart
- Ed Mirvish OC (1914–2007), founder of Honest Ed's
- Jack Rabinovitch CC (1930–2017), philanthropist
- Heather Reisman CM (1948– ), founder and CEO of Indigo Books and Music
- Dani Reiss CM (1973– ), president and CEO of Canada Goose
- Irv Robbins (1917–2008), co-founder of Baskin-Robbins
- Bruce Rockowitz (1958– ), CEO and vice-chairman of Global Brands Group
- Harry Rosen CM (1931– ), founder of Harry Rosen Inc.
- Larry Rosen (1956– ), chairman and CEO of Harry Rosen Inc.
- Calin Rovinescu CM (1955– ), president and CEO of Air Canada
- Isai Scheinberg (1946– ), co-founder of PokerStars
- Mark Scheinberg (1973– ), co-founder of PokerStars
- Isadore Sharp OC (1931– ), founder and chairman of Four Seasons Hotels and Resorts
- Barry Sherman CM (1942–2017), chairman and CEO of Apotex
- Jeffrey Skoll OC (1965– ), president of eBay
- Sam Steinberg (1905–1978), president of Steinberg's
- Larry Tanenbaum OC (1945– ), chairman of Maple Leaf Sports & Entertainment

== Law ==
=== Judges ===
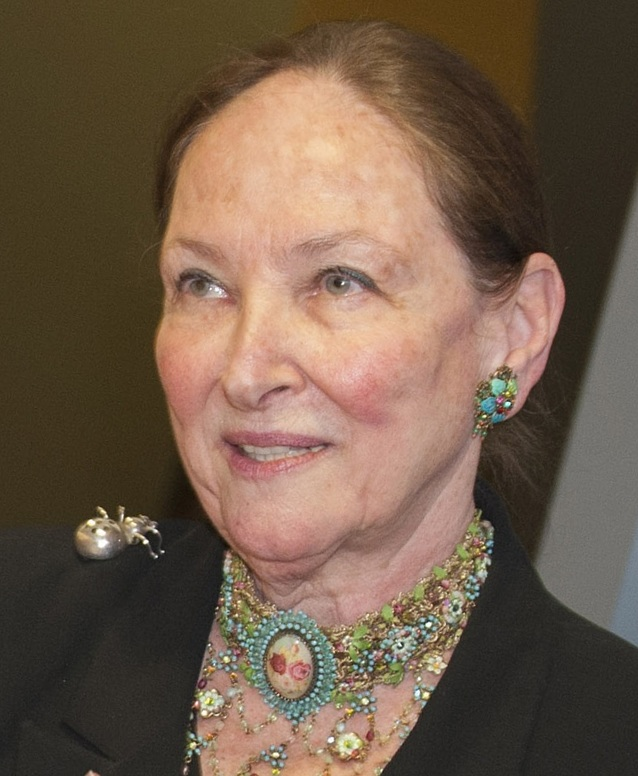
Rosalie Abella

- Rosalie Abella (1946– ), Supreme Court Justice
- Harry Batshaw (1902–1984), Quebec Superior Court Justice
- Charles Dubin OC (1921–2008), Chief Justice of Ontario
- Morris Fish CC (1938– ), Supreme Court Justice
- Samuel Freedman OC (1908–1993), Chief Justice of Manitoba
- Constance Glube OC (1931–2016), Chief Justice of Nova Scotia
- Alan Gold OC (1917–2005), Chief Justice of Quebec
- Sydney Harris (1917–2009), judge
- Bora Laskin CC (1912–1984), 14th Chief Justice of Canada
- Herbert Marx (1932–2020), Quebec Superior Court Justice and Minister of Justice
- Michael Moldaver (1947– ), Supreme Court Justice
- Nathaniel Nemetz CC (1913–1997), Chief Justice of British Columbia
- Marshall Rothstein CC (1940– ), Supreme Court Justice
- Tillie Taylor (1922–2011), Saskatchewan's first female magistrate

=== Lawyers ===
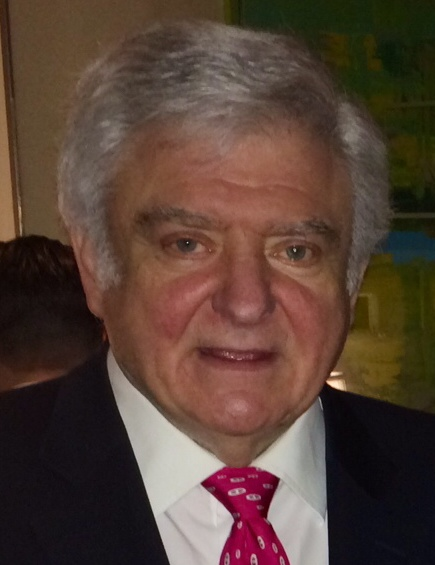
Edward Greenspan

- Monroe Abbey CM (1904–1993), lawyer
- Maurice Alexander (1889–1945), barrister
- Dennis Beker (1989–present), lawyer
- Louis Bloomfield (1906–1984), lawyer and businessman
- Alan Borovoy OC (1932–2015), lawyer and human rights activist
- Harold Buchwald CM (1928–2008), lawyer
- Reuben Cohen CC (1921–2014), lawyer and businessman
- Martin Friedland CC (1932– ), lawyer
- Rocco Galati (1959– ), constitutional lawyer
- Edward Greenspan (1944–2014), lawyer
- Adolphus Hart (1814–1879), lawyer and activist
- David Matas CM (1943– ), human rights lawyer
- Ed Morgan (1955– ), international lawyer
- Harry Rankin (1920–2002), lawyer
- William Schabas OC (1950– ), professor of international law
- Morris Shumiatcher OC (1917–2004), lawyer and human rights activist
- Harvey Strosberg (1944– ), lawyer
- Harry Walsh OC (1913–2011), criminal lawyer
- Benjamin Zimmerman (1862–1923), justice of the peace

== Military ==
- Morris Cohen (1887–1970), Canadian Expeditionary Force officers and adventurer
- Eleazar David David (1811–1887), cavalry officer
- Ben Dunkelman (1913–1997), World War II and 1948 Arab–Israeli War soldier
- Moe Hurwitz DCM (1919–1944), World War II soldier
- Maxwell Kogon DFC (1920–1980), World War II bomber pilot
- Yank Levy (1897–1965), soldier and military instructor
- Gill Rosenberg (1983– ), member of the Women's Protection Units
- Sydney Shulemson DFC (1915–2007), World War II fighter pilot
- Peter Stevens (RAF officer) (1919–1979), German born WWII RAF officer, and RCAF post-war, best known for multiple POW escapes

== Performing arts ==
=== Actors and performers ===
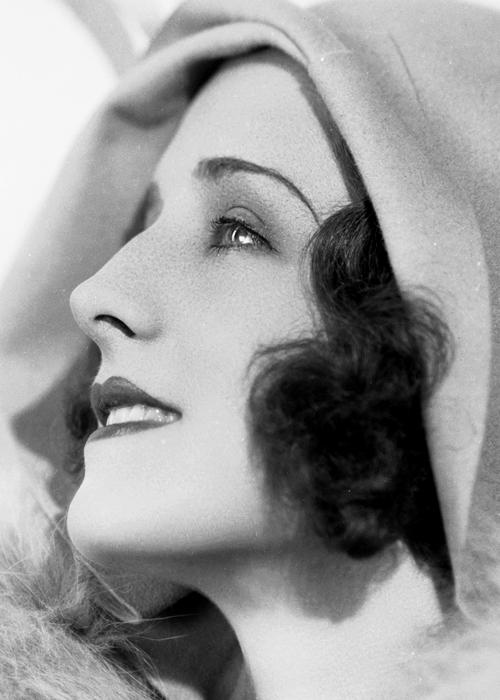
Norma Shearer

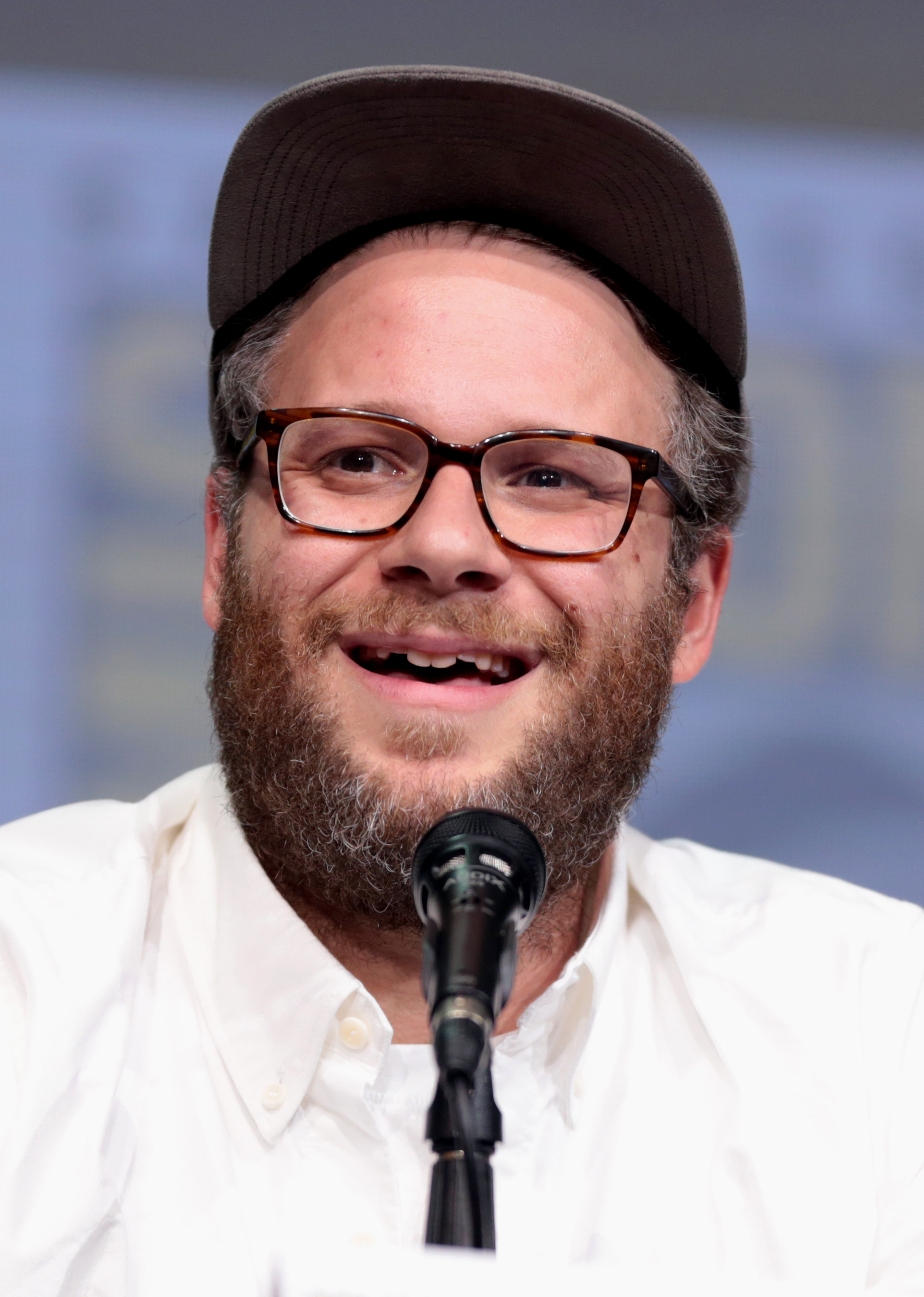
Seth Rogen

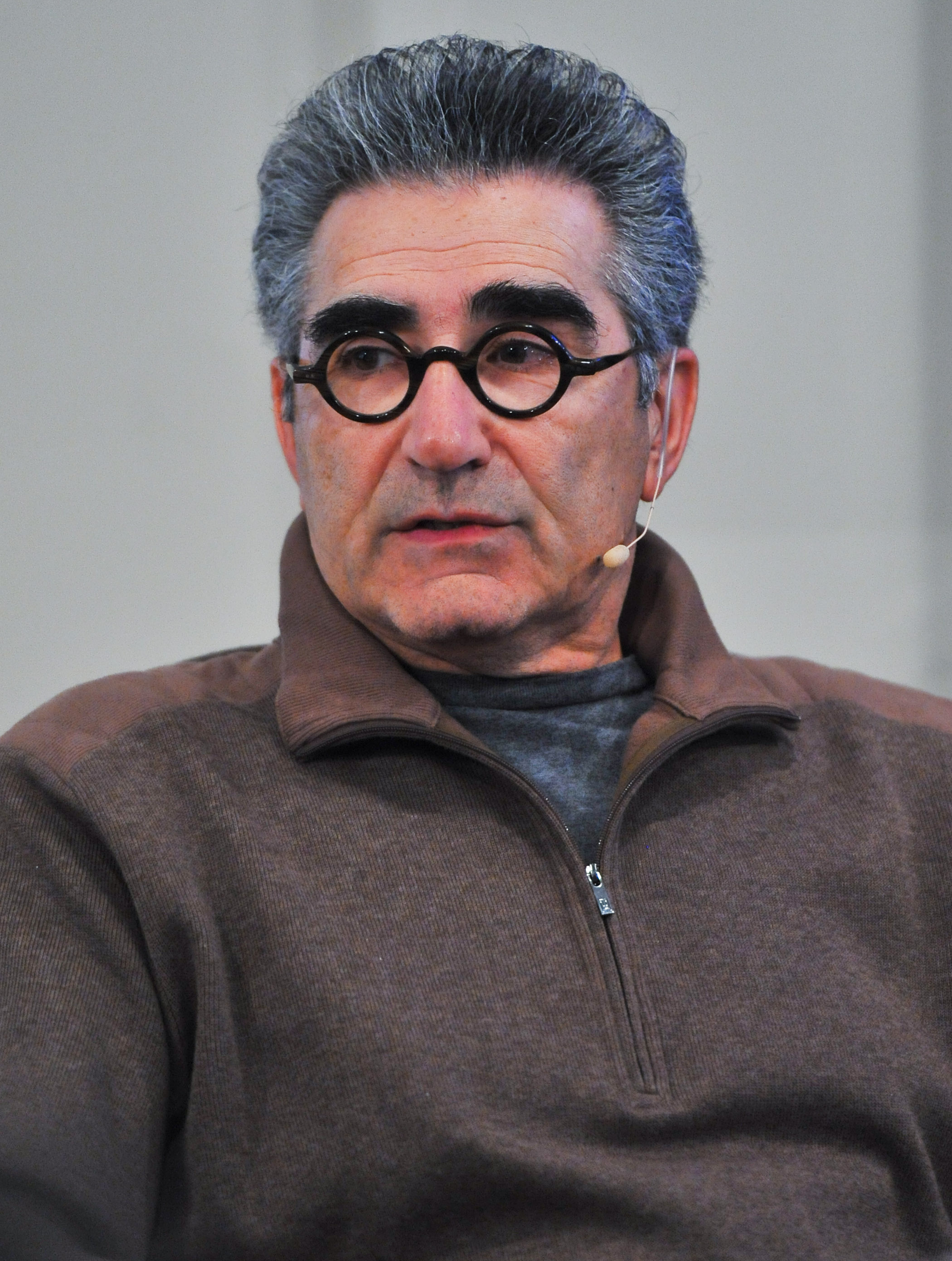
Eugene Levy

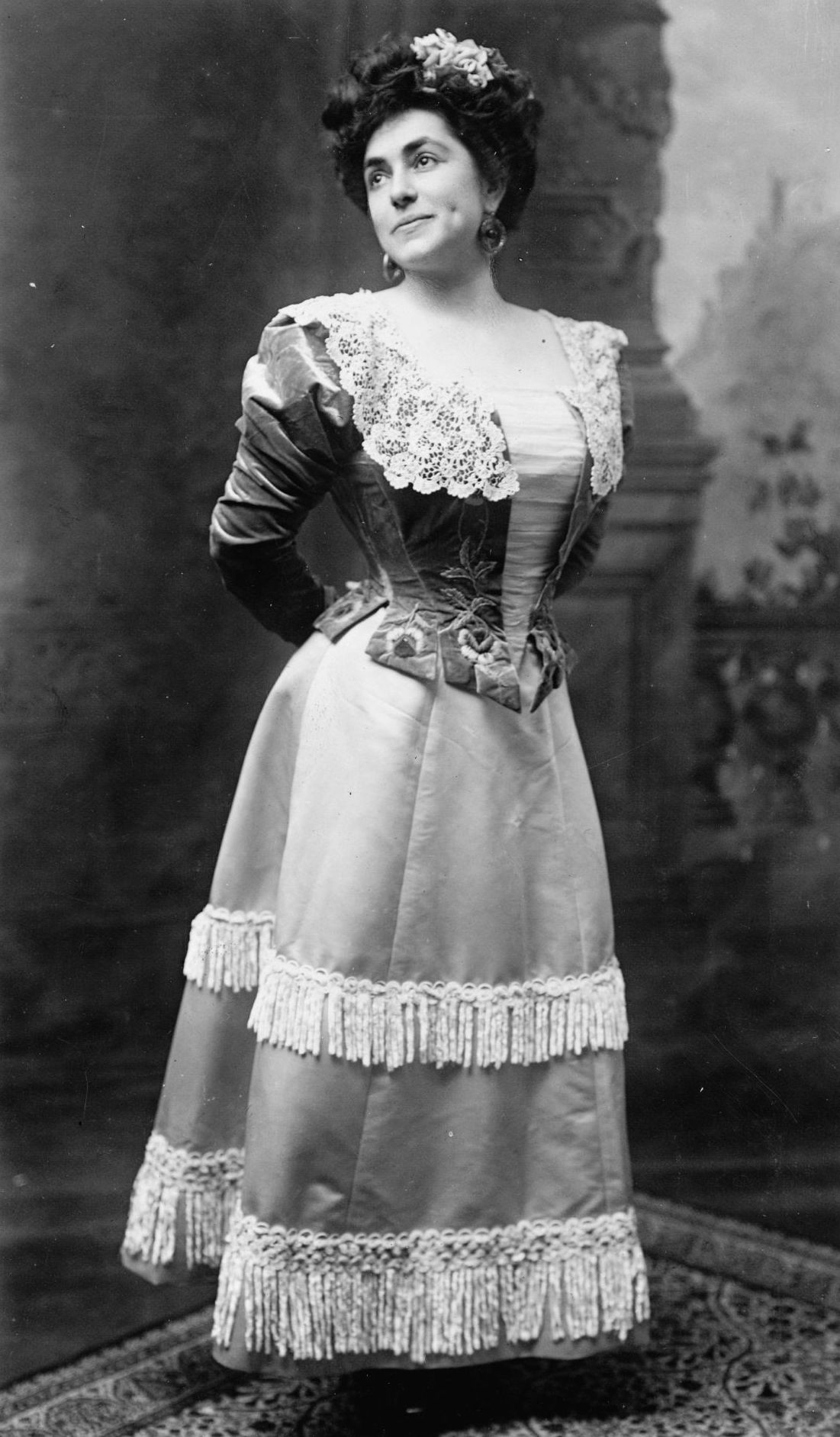
Pauline Donalda

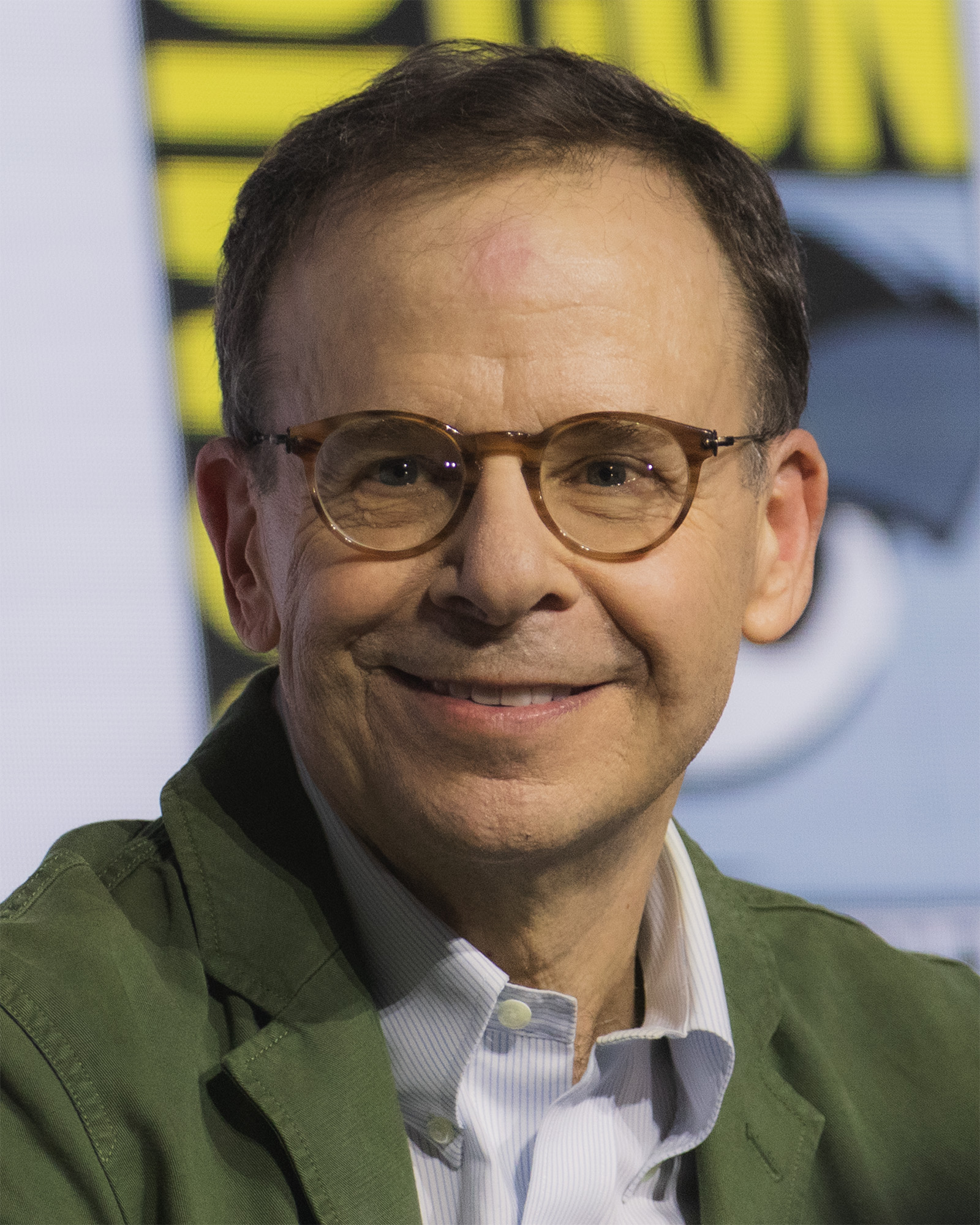
Rick Moranis

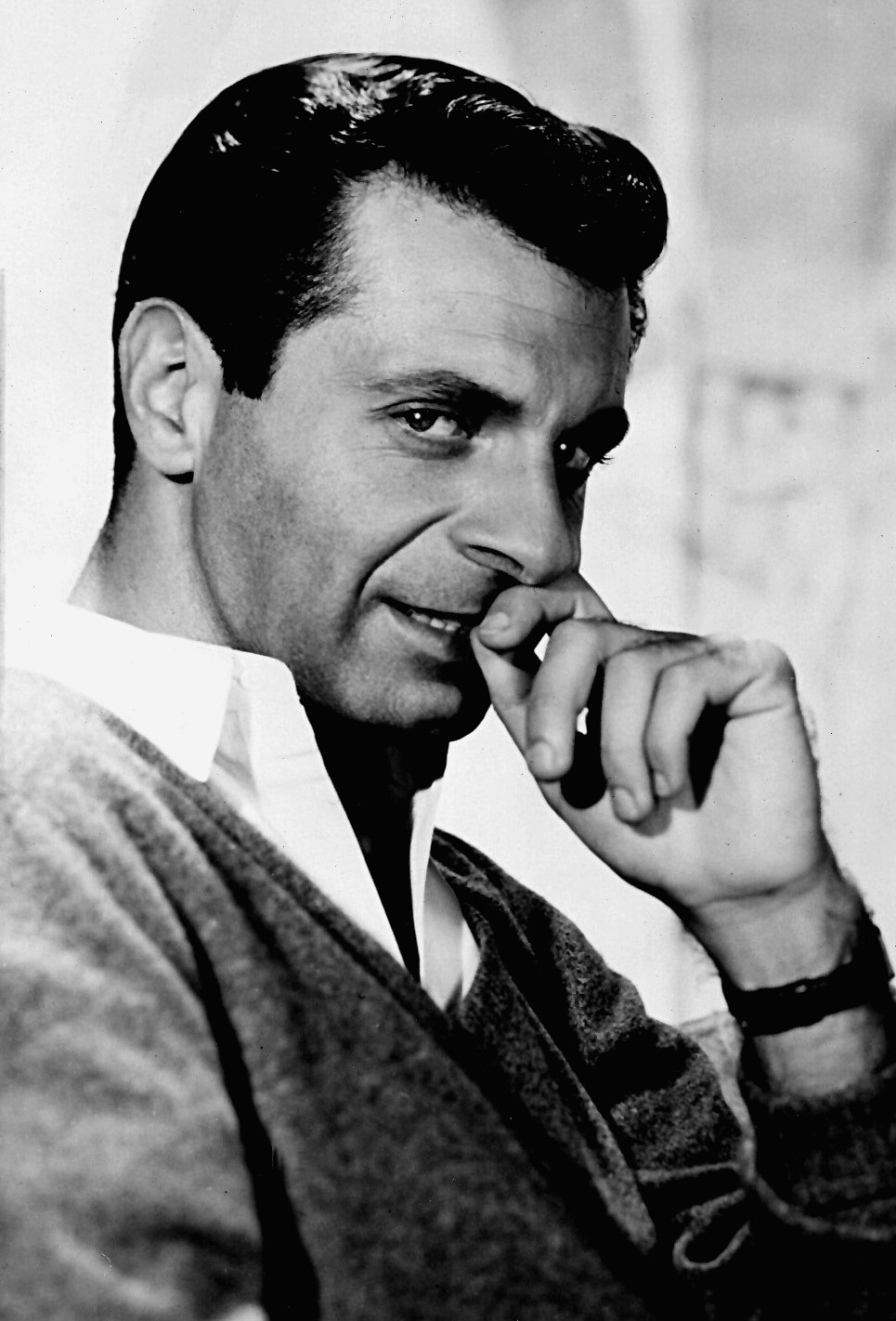
Mort Sahl

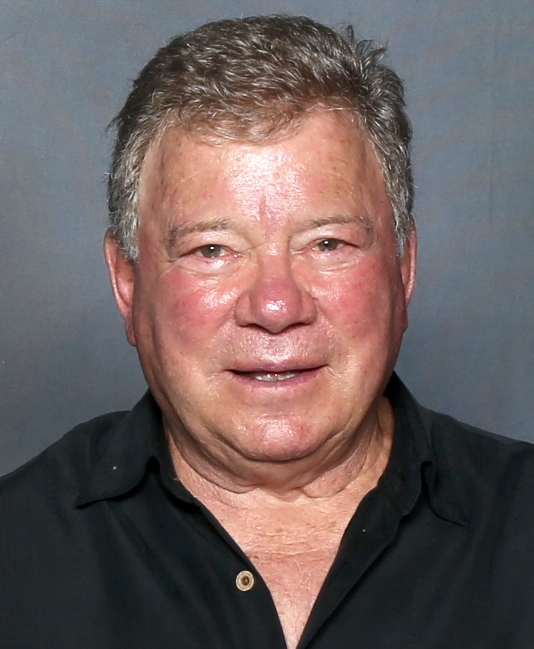
William Shatner

- Harvey Atkin (1942–2017), actor and voice actor
- Aviva Armour-Ostroff, actress and filmmaker
- Liane Balaban (1980– ), actress
- Jay Baruchel (1982– ), actor, comedian, and screenwriter
- Frances Bay (1919–2011), character actress
- Lani Billard (1979– ), television actress
- Lionel Blair (1928–2021), actor and choreographer
- Ben Blue (1901–1975), actor and comedian
- Lloyd Bochner (1924–2005), actor
- Bobby Breen (1927–2016), actor and singer
- Howard Busgang, comedian
- Neve Campbell (1973– ), film and television actress
- Maury Chaykin (1949–2010), actor
- Boris Cherniak (1964– ), hypnotist
- Emmanuelle Chriqui (1975– ), actress
- Lauren Collins (1986– ), television actress
- Pauline Donalda OC (1882–1970), operatic soprano
- Barbara Dunkelman (1989– ), actress and internet personality
- Ophira Eisenberg (1972– ), comedian
- Jamie Elman (born 1976 or 1977), actor
- Jake Epstein (1987– ), television actor
- Stacey Farber (1987– ), television actress
- Maureen Forrester CC (1930–2010), operatic contralto
- Celia Franca CC (1921–2007), founder of the National Ballet of Canada
- Victor Garber (1949– ), actor
- Jessalyn Gilsig (1971– ), television actress
- Joanna Gleason (1950– ), actress
- Jake Goldsbie (1988– ), television actor
- Anais Granofsky (1973– ), actress
- Lorne Greene (1915–1987), actor
- Nathan Fielder (1983– ), actor and comedian
- Corey Haim (1971–2010), actor
- Monty Hall (1921–2017), game show host
- Melissa Hayden (1923–2006), ballerina
- Lou Jacobi (1913–2009), actor
- Jonathan Keltz (1988– ), actor
- Shane Kippel (1986– ), television actor
- Mia Kirshner (1975– ), actress
- Jack Kruschen (1922–2002), character actor
- Paul Kligman (1923–1985), actor
- Rachelle Lefevre (1979– ), actress
- Sylvia Lennick (1915–2009), actress
- Caissie Levy (1981– ), stage actress and singer
- Eugene Levy CM (1946– ), actor and director
- Jaclyn Linetsky (1986–2003), television actress
- Mary Livingstone (1905–1983), radio comedian and actress
- Howie Mandel (1955– ), actor and comedian
- Rick Moranis (1953– ), actor and comedian
- Harley Morenstein (1985–), actor and Internet personality
- Irene Pavloska (1889–1962), mezzo-soprano
- Gloria Reuben (1964– ), television actress
- Spencer Rice (1963– ), writer, director and performer
- Seth Rogen (1982– ), film and television actor
- Sasha Roiz (1973– ), actor
- Saul Rubinek (1948– ), actor, director, producer and playwright
- Jonathan Sagall (1959– ), actor
- Mort Sahl (1927–2021), stand-up comedian
- William Shatner OC (1931– ), actor, director, and writer
- Norma Shearer (1902–1983), actress and Hollywood star
- Frank Shuster OC (1916–2002), comedian
- Anna Silk (1974– ), actress
- David Steinberg CM (1942– ), comedian and director
- Stuart Stone (1980– ), actor
- Tara Strong (1973– ), actress
- Kyle Switzer (1985– ), television actor
- Theresa Tova (1955– ), actress and playwright
- Al Waxman CM (1935–2001), actor
- Johnny Wayne (1918–1990), comedian
- Joseph Wiseman (1918–2009), theatre and film actor
- Finn Wolfhard (2002– ), actor

=== Directors and producers ===
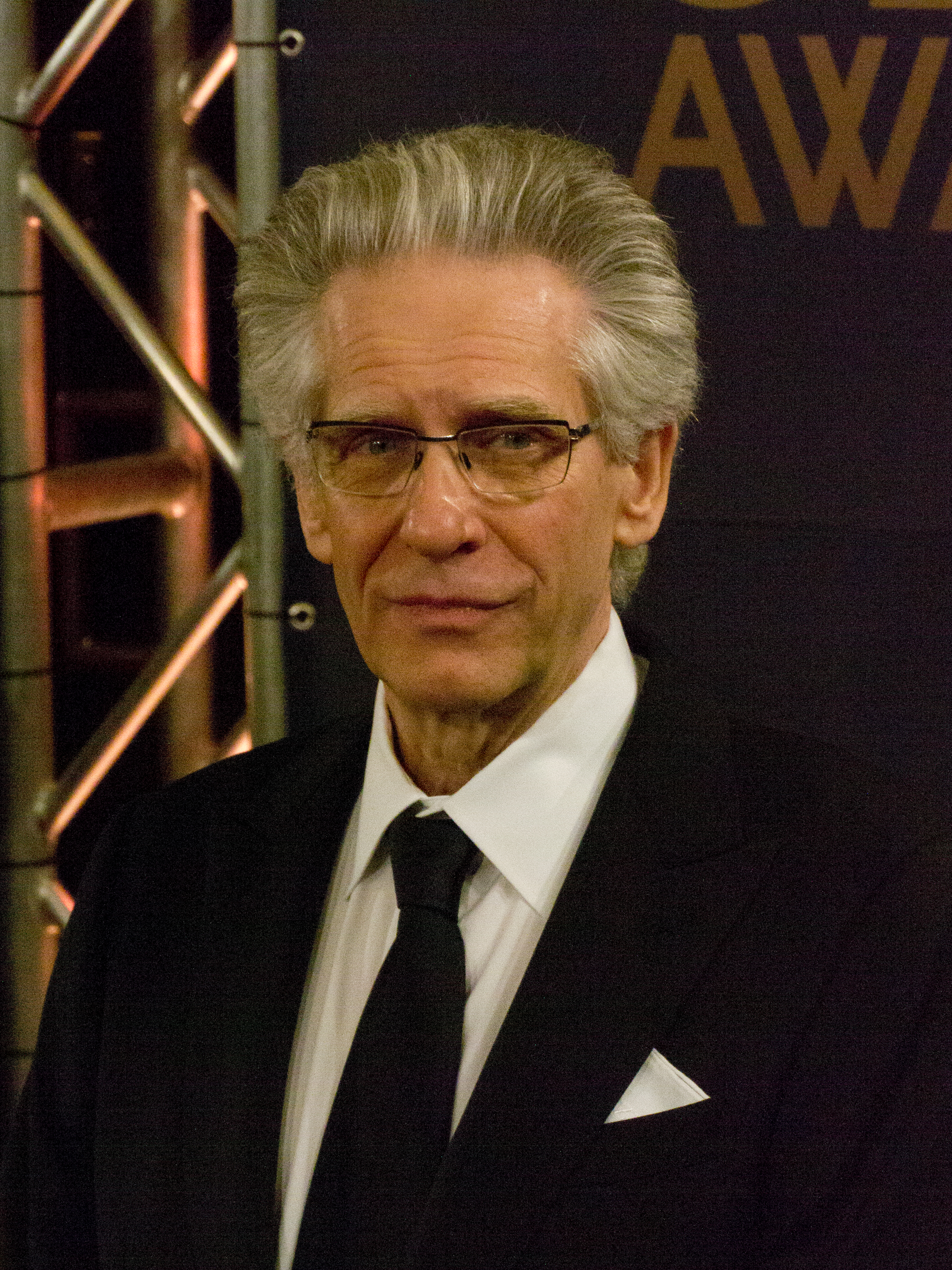
David Cronenberg

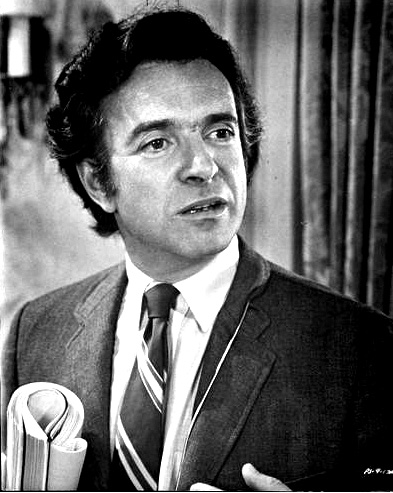
Arthur Hiller

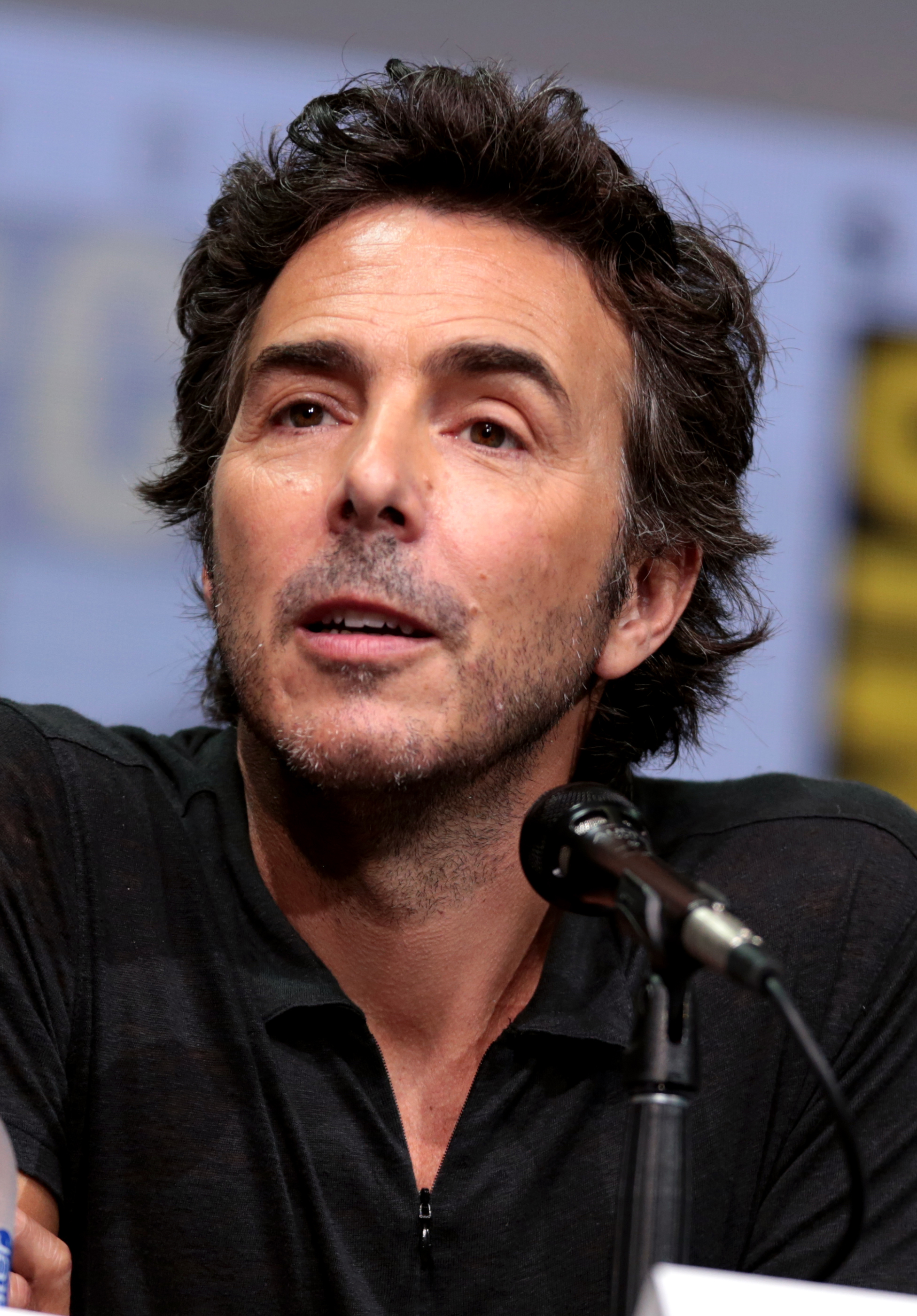
Shawn Levy

- Barry Avrich (1963– ), television producer and film director
- Laszlo Barna (1948– ), television producer
- Zack Bernbaum, film director
- Murray Cohl CM (1929–2008), film director
- David Cronenberg CC (1943– ), filmmaker and screenwriter
- Garth Drabinsky (1949– ), film and theatrical producer
- Bob Ezrin (1949– ), music producer
- Ken Finkleman (1946– ), television producer
- Jay Firestone (1956– ), film and television producer
- Sidney Furie (1933– ), film director
- Herman Geiger-Torel OC (1907–1976), opera director
- Jake Gold (1958– ), musician manager
- Harold Greenberg CM (1930–1996), film producer
- Al Guest (1933– ), animation producer and director
- Arthur Hiller OC (1923–2016), director
- John Hirsch OC (1930–1989), theatre director
- Michael Hirsh (1948– ), television producer
- Kenny Hotz (1967– ), producer and entertainer
- Simcha Jacobovici (1953– ), film director
- Estelle Klein (1930–2004), artistic director
- Franz Kraemer OC (1914–1999), radio producer
- Shawn Levy (1968– ), film director and producer
- Avi Lewis (1968– ), documentary filmmaker and television host
- Benjamin Lumley (1811–1875), opera director
- Francis Mankiewicz (1944–1993), director
- Lorne Michaels CC (1944– ), television producer
- David Mirvish CM (1944– ), theatre producer
- Sydney Newman OC (1917–1997), producer
- Noah Pink, screenwriter and television producer
- Jeremy Podeswa (1962– ), film and television director
- Ivan Reitman OC (1946–2022), film producer and director
- Jason Reitman (1977– ), film director
- J.R. Rotem (1975– ), record producer
- Albert Ruddy (1930– ), film director
- Harry Saltzman (1915–1994), film producer
- Paul Saltzman (1943– ), film director and producer, founder of Sunrise Films
- Arna Selznick (1948– ), film director and story artist specializing in animation
- Dora Wasserman (1919–2003), playwright and theater director

=== Composers ===
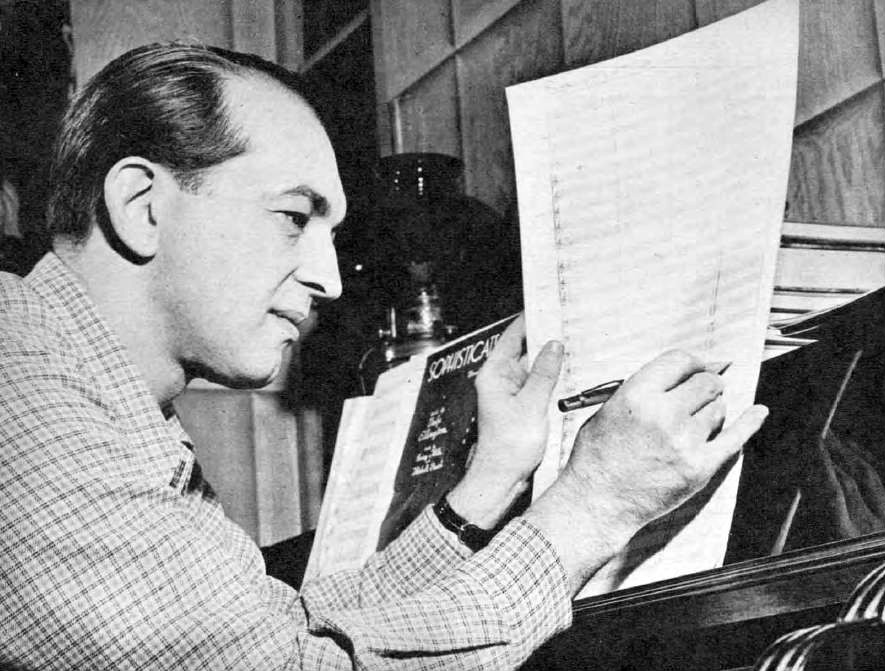
Percy Faith

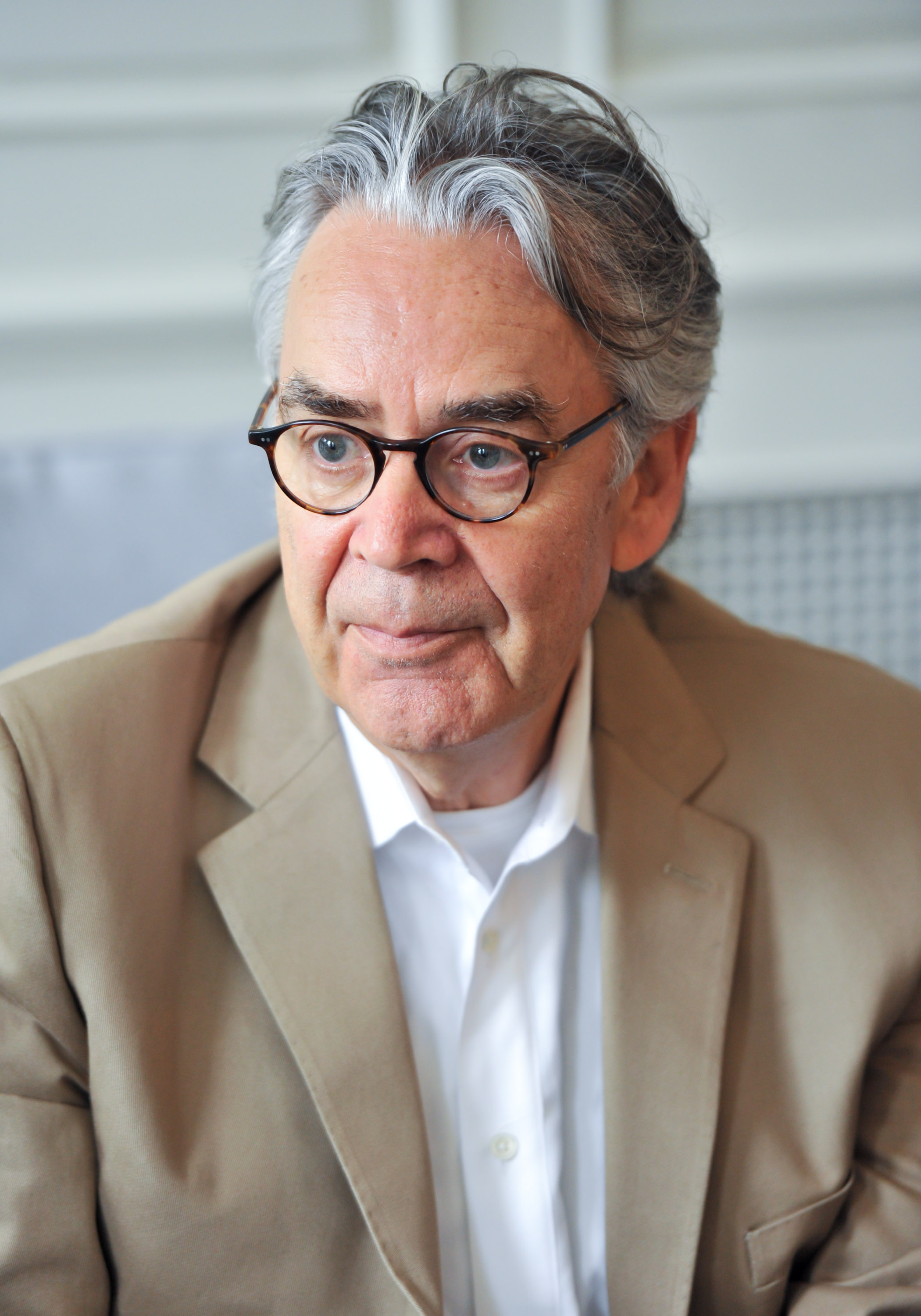
Howard Shore

- Murray Adaskin OC (1906–2002), composer
- Karel Ančerl (1908–1973), conductor
- István Anhalt OC (1919–2012), composer
- Louis Applebaum OC (1918–2000), film score composer
- Milton Barnes (1931–2001), composer and conductor
- Boris Berlin OC (1907–2001), musical instructor and composer
- David Botwinik (1920–2022), composer
- Alexander Brott CM (1915–2005), conductor and composer
- Boris Brott OC (1944– ), conductor
- Percy Faith (1908–1976), bandleader
- Harry Freedman OC (1922–2005), composer
- Lewis Furey (1949– ), composer
- Srul Glick CM (1934–2002), composer
- Helmut Kallmann (1918–1985), composer
- Uri Mayer (1946– ), conductor and violinist
- Oskar Morawetz CM (1917–2007), composer
- Albert Pratz (1914–1995), conductor and violinist
- Paul Shaffer CM (1949– ), bandleader
- Howard Shore OC (1946– ), composer
- Ben Steinberg (1930– ), composer and conductor
- Heinz Unger (1895–1965), conductor
- Maurice Zbriger (1896–1981), composer and violinist

=== Musicians ===
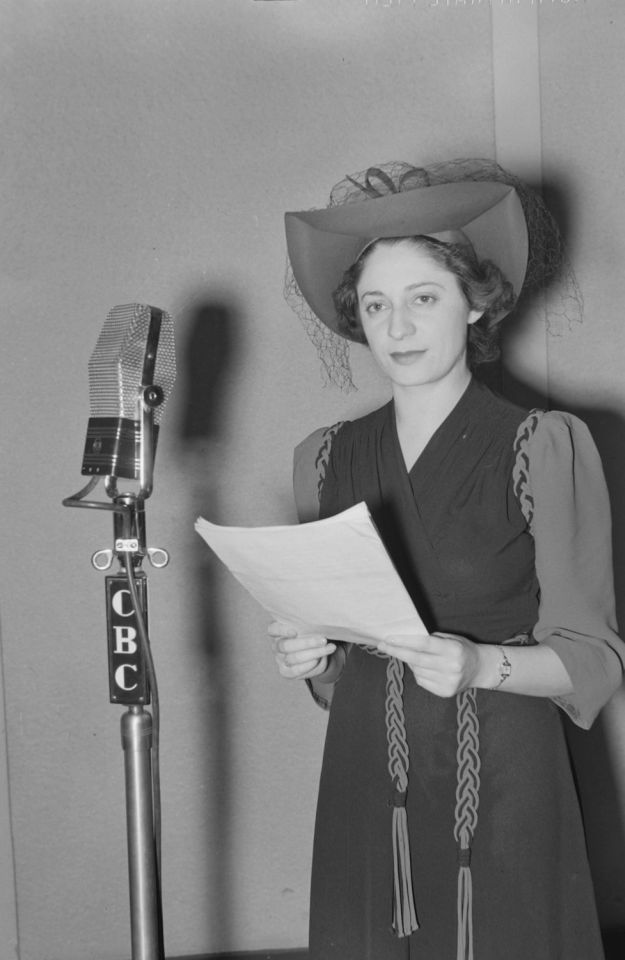
Ethel Stark

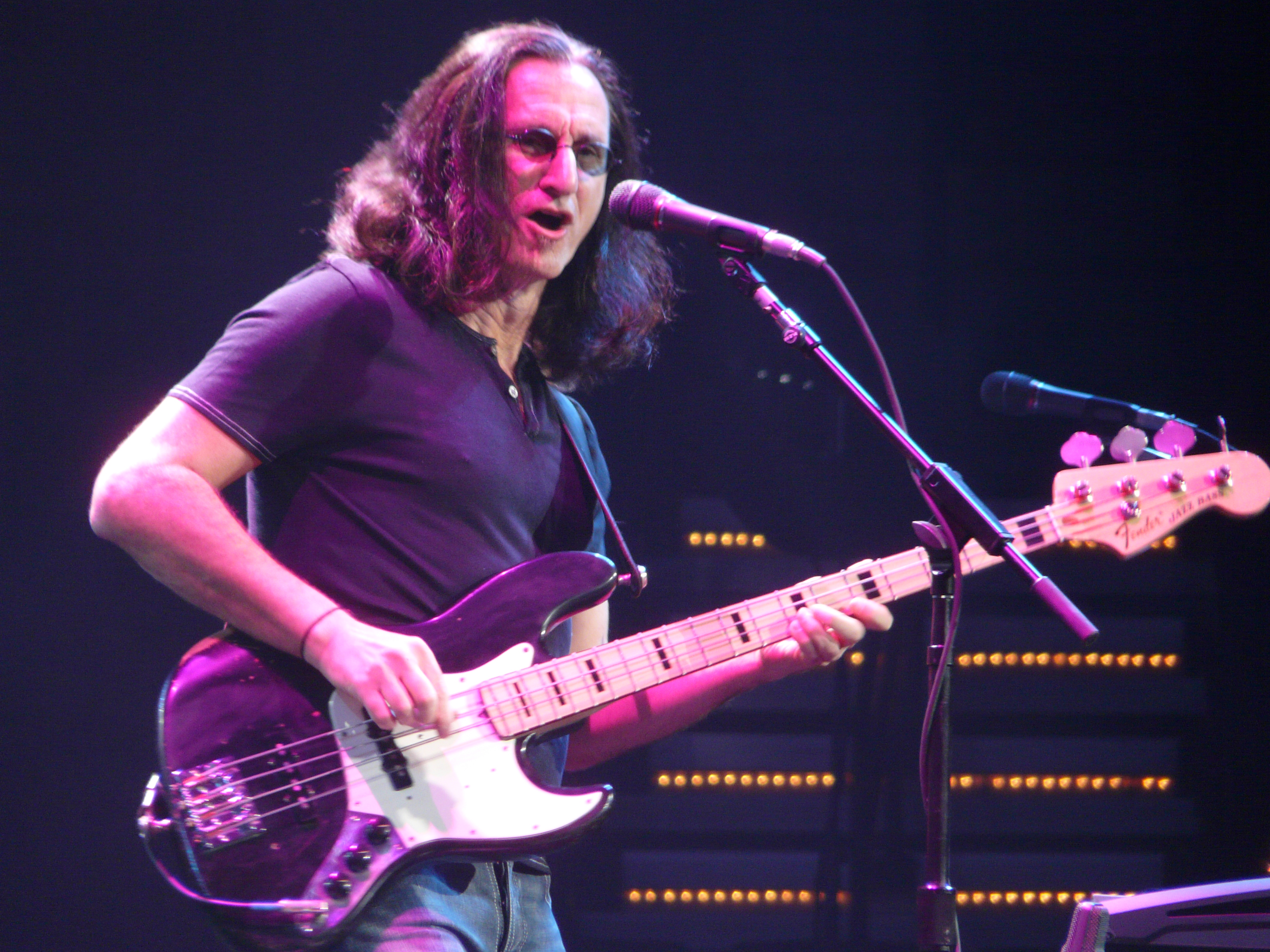
Geddy Lee

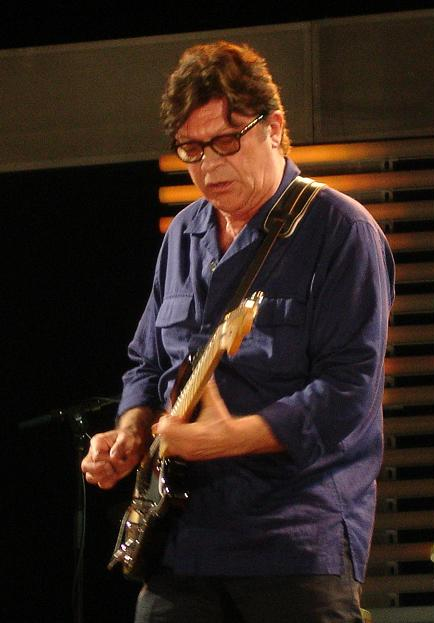
Robbie Robertson

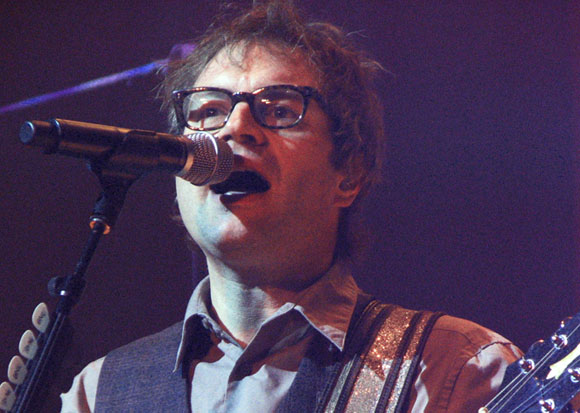
Steven Page

==== Classical ====
- Frances Adaskin CM (1900–2001), pianist
- Harry Adaskin CM (1901–1994), violinist
- Ellen Ballon (1898–1969), pianist
- Denis Brott CM (1950– ), cellist
- Rivka Golani (1946– ), viola player
- Moshe Hammer (1946– ), violinist
- Ofra Harnoy CM (1965– ), cellist
- Jacques Israelievitch CM (1948–2015), violinist
- Minuetta Kessler (1914–2002), concert pianist
- Anton Kuerti OC (1938– ), pianist
- Zara Nelsova (1918–2002), cellist
- Isidor Philipp (1863–1958), pianist and composer
- Ari Posner (born 1970), film and television score composer
- Ezra Schabas CM (1924–2020), musician
- Harold Sumberg (1905–1994), violinist
- Ethel Stark CM (1910–2012), violinist and conductor
- John Weinzweig OC (1913–2006), composer
- George Zukerman OC (1927– ), bassoonist and impresario

==== Jazz ====
- Paul Bley CM (1932–2016), pianist
- Jim Gelcer (1961– ), jazz musician
- James Gelfand (1959– ), jazz pianist
- Moe Koffman OC (1928–2001), jazz musician
- Sophie Milman (1983– ), jazz musician
- Nikki Yanofsky (1994– ), jazz-pop singer

==== Popular ====
- Leonard Cohen
- A-Trak (1982– ), DJ
- Oscar Brand (1920–2016), folk singer
- Drake (1986– ), rapper and actor
- Corey Hart (1962– ), singer
- Paul Hoffert CM (1943– ), founding member of Lighthouse
- Geddy Lee OC (1953– ), lead singer of Rush
- Efrim Menuck (1971– ), musician
- Ben Mink (1951– ), songwriter and musician
- Steven Page (1970– ), founding member of Barenaked Ladies
- Peaches (1966– ), electronic musician
- Robbie Robertson OC (1943–2023), lead guitarist of The Band
- Eddie Schwartz CM (1949– ), songwriter and music producer
- Sharon, Lois & Bram, children's music group
- Amy Sky (1960– ), singer-songwriter
- Socalled, rapper and producer
- Chaim Tannenbaum, folk singer
- Vanity (1959–2016), singer-songwriter
- David Usher (1966– ), frontman for Moist
- Bob Wiseman (1962– ), composer and founding member of Blue Rodeo
- Zal Yanovsky (1944–2002), rock musician, the Lovin' Spoonful guitarist
- Alissa White-Gluz (1985– ), death metal vocalist

== Politics ==
=== Diplomats ===
- Klaus Goldschlag OC (1922–2012), ambassador
- Allan Gotlieb CC (1928–2020), ambassador
- Saul Rae (1914–1999), diplomat
- Norman Spector (1949– ), diplomat and journalist

=== Mayors ===
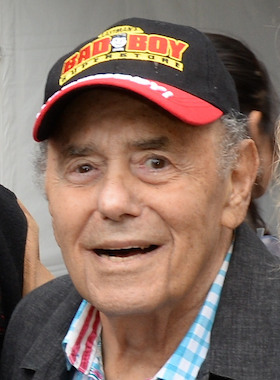
Mel Lastman

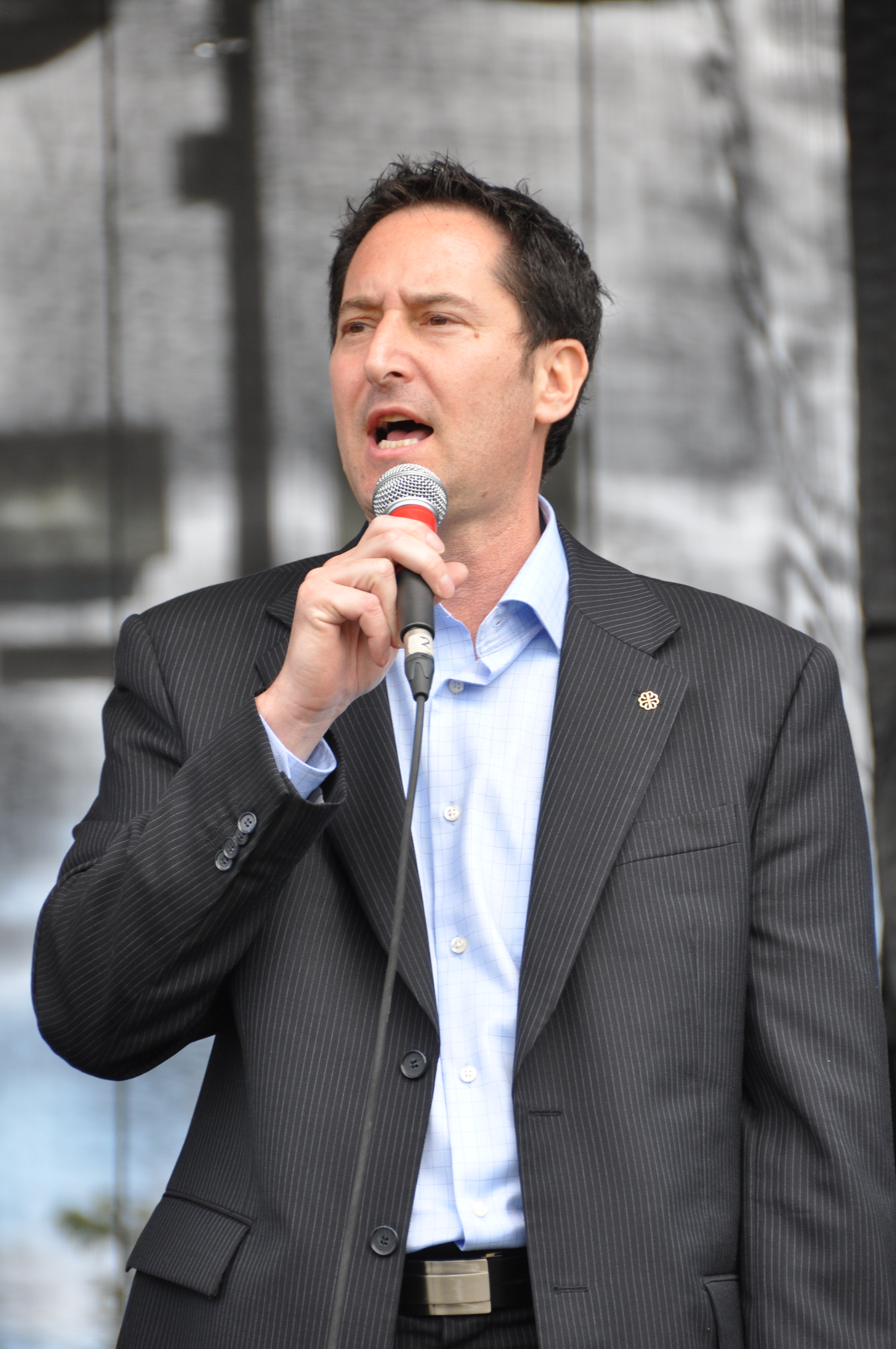
Michael Applebaum

- Michael Applebaum (1963– ), mayor of Montreal
- Sidney Buckwold OC (1916–2001), mayor of Saskatoon
- Martin Dobkin (1942– ), first mayor of Mississauga
- Lumley Franklin (1808–1873), mayor of Victoria
- Philip Givens (1922–1995), mayor of Toronto and Liberal MP
- Lorry Greenberg (1933–1999), mayor of Ottawa
- Jacquelin Holzman (1935– ), mayor of Ottawa
- Sam Katz (1951– ), mayor of Winnipeg
- Leonard Arthur Kitz (1916–2006), mayor of Halifax
- Mel Lastman (1933–2021), mayor of Toronto
- Saul Laskin (1918–2008), mayor of Thunder Bay
- Stephen Mandel (1945– ), mayor of Edmonton and leader of the Alberta Party
- Danny Nathanson, mayor of New Waterford, Nova Scotia
- David Oppenheimer (1834–1897), mayor of Vancouver
- Nathan Phillips (1892–1976), mayor of Toronto
- Harvey Rosen (1949– ), mayor of Kingston
- Morley Rosenberg (1937– ), mayor of Kitchener
- Max Silverman (1906-1966), mayor of Sudbury

=== Politicians ===
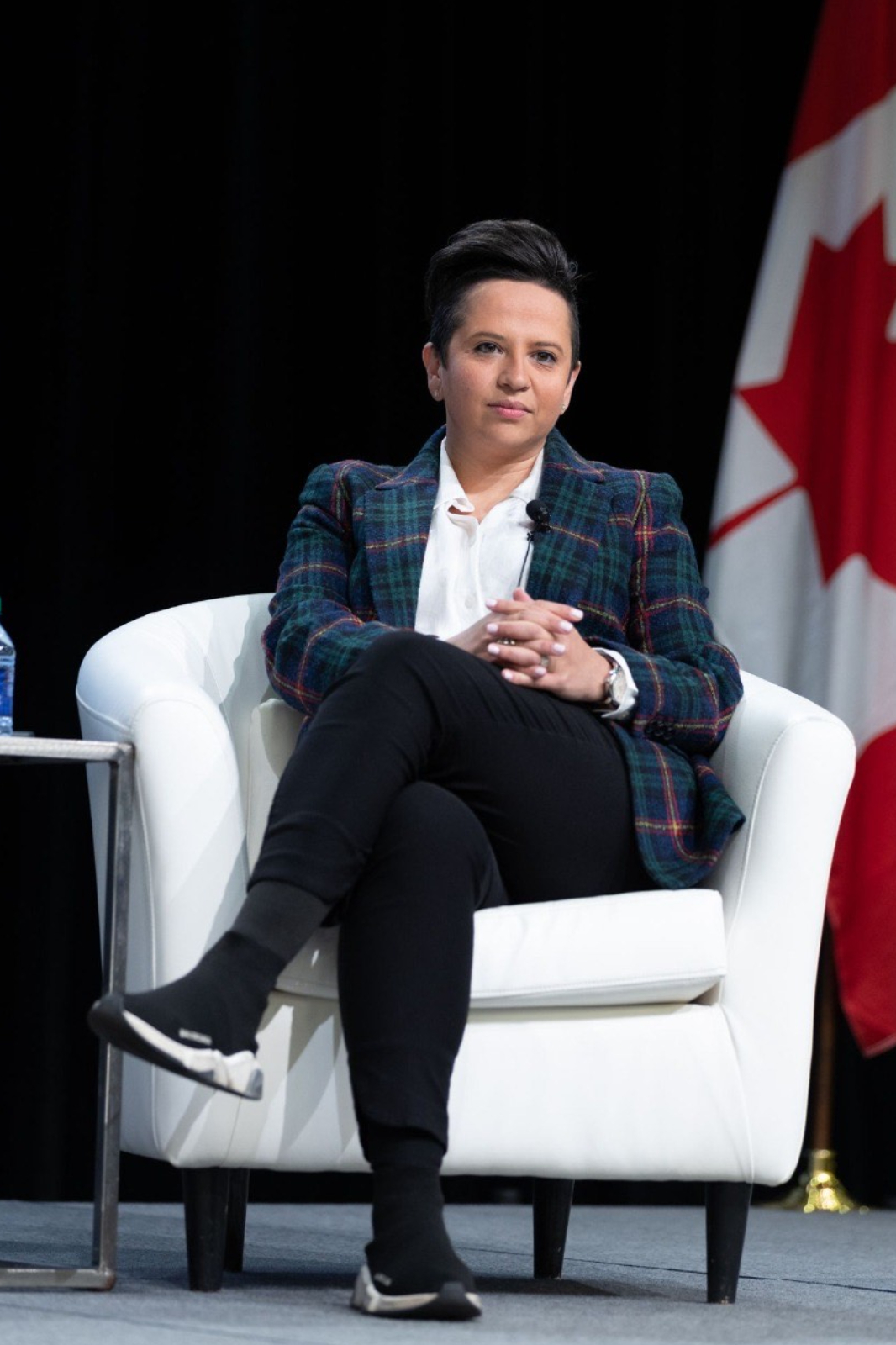
Melissa Lantsman

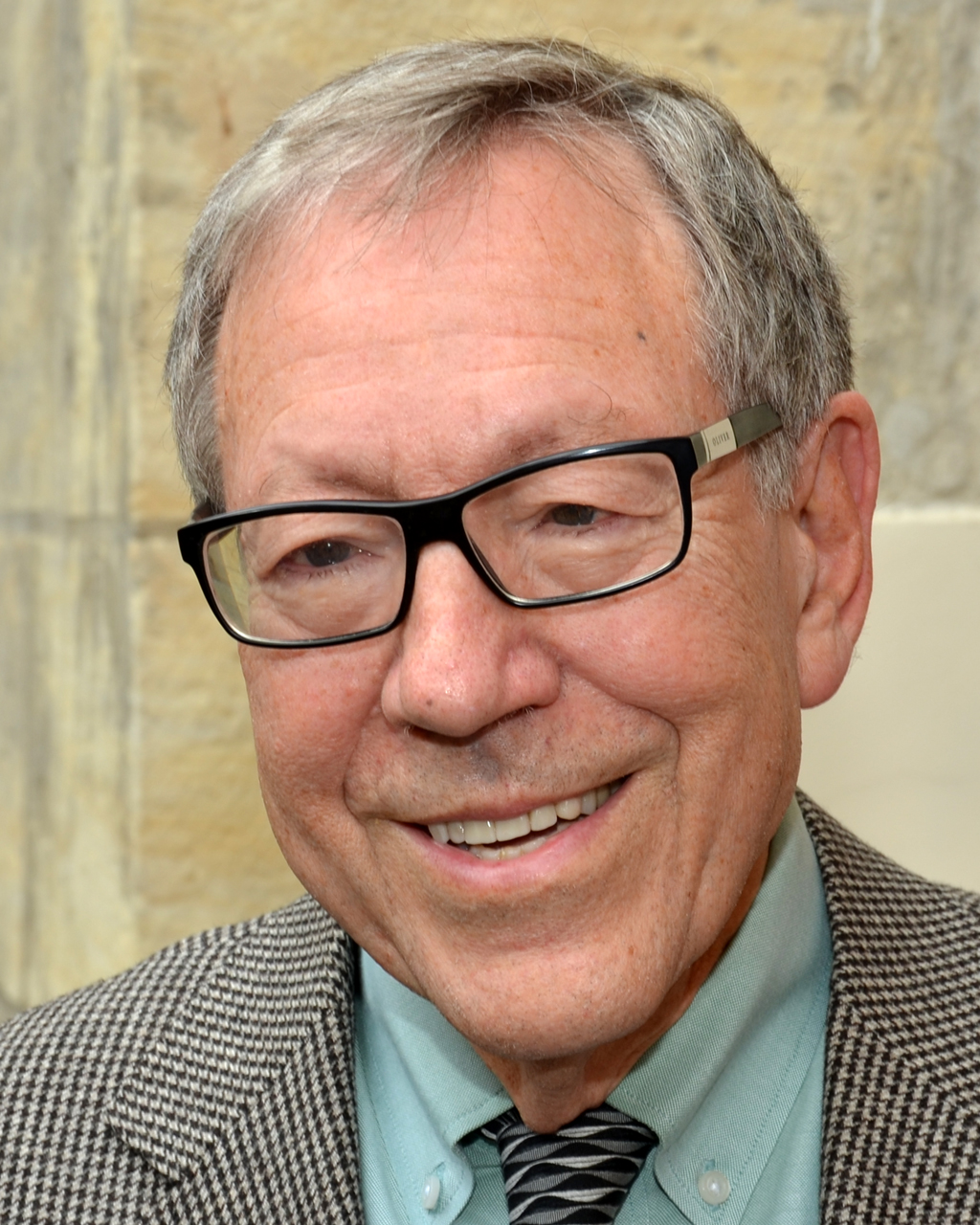
Irwin Cotler

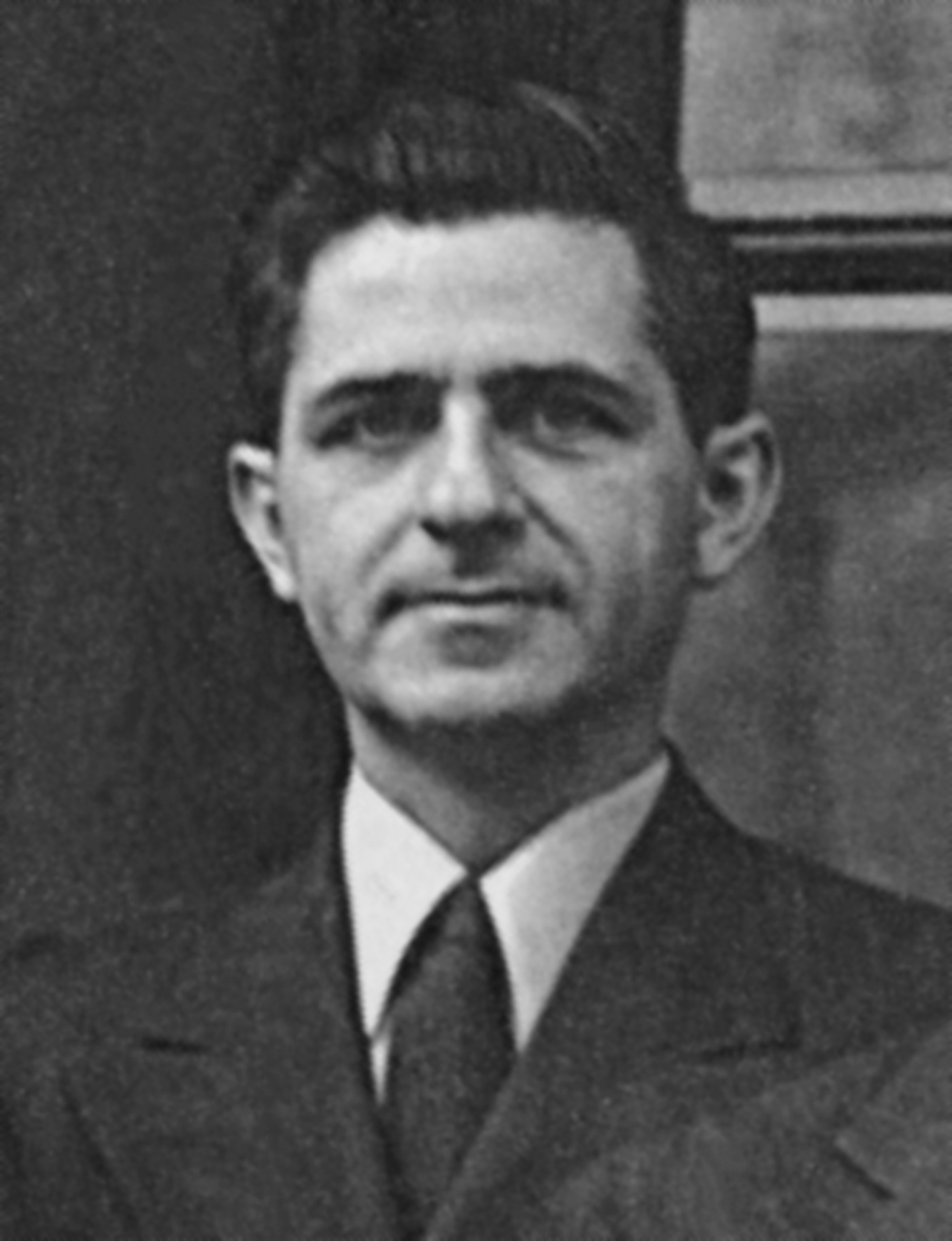
David Lewis

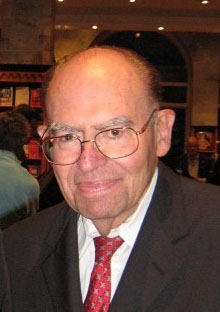
Herb Gray

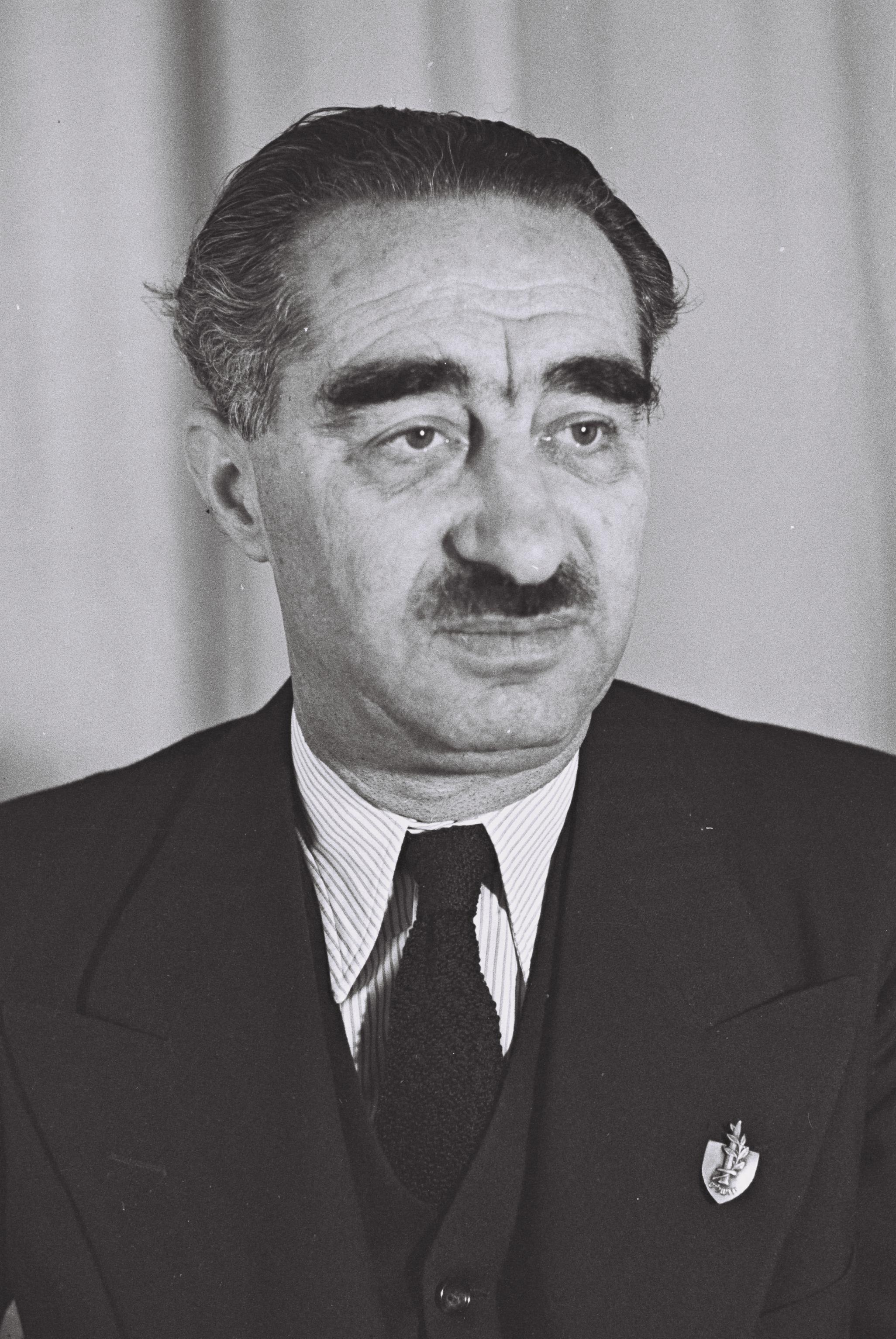
Dov Yosef

- Jack Austin CM (1932– ), senator and cabinet minister
- Dave Barrett OC (1930–2018), 26th Premier of British Columbia
- George Benjamin (1799–1864), Conservative MP
- Peter Bercovitch (1879–1942), Liberal MP and Quebec Liberal MNA
- Lawrence Bergman (1940– ), Quebec Liberal MNA and cabinet minister
- Harry Blank (1925– ), Quebec Liberal MPP
- Annie Buller (1895–1973), co-founder of the Communist Party of Canada
- Elinor Caplan (1944– ), Liberal MP and cabinet minister
- Jim Carr, Liberal MP and Minister of Natural Resources
- Leon Crestohl (1900–1963), Liberal MP
- Saul Cherniack CM (1917–2018), Manitoba NDP MP and cabinet minister
- Tony Clement (1961– ), Minister of Industry and Minister of Health
- Irwin Cotler OC (1940– ), Liberal MP and Minister of Justice
- David Croll (1900–1991), senator and Liberal MP
- Julie Dabrusin (1971– ), Liberal MP
- Barney Danson CC (1921–2011), Liberal MP and Minister of National Defence
- Samuel Factor (1892–1962), first Jewish MP elected in Ontario
- Sheila Finestone (1927–2009), Liberal MP and senator
- Myra Freeman CM (1949– ), 29th Lieutenant Governor of Nova Scotia
- Linda Frum (1963– ), senator
- Irving Gerstein CM (1941– ), senator and businessman
- Marc Gold (1950– ), senator and law professor
- Carl Goldenberg OC OBE (1907–1996), senator
- Victor Goldbloom CC (1923–2016), Quebec Liberal MNA and doctor
- Yoine Goldstein (1934–2020), senator
- Karina Gould (1987– ), Liberal MP and Minister of Democratic Institutions
- Herb Gray CC (1931–2014), Liberal MP and Deputy Prime Minister
- Larry Grossman (1943–1997), leader of the Ontario PC Party
- Ezekiel Hart (1770–1843), first Jew elected to a Canadian Parliament
- Solomon Hart Green (1885–1969), first Jew to sit in a provincial legislature
- Stanley Hartt OC (1937–2018), Chief of Staff
- Sharren Haskel (1984– ), Likud MK
- Chaviva Hošek OC (1946– ), academic and politician
- Anthony Housefather (1971– ), Liberal MP and mayor of Côte Saint-Luc
- Samuel William Jacobs (1871–1938), Liberal MP and Jewish community leader
- Michael Kerzner, Solicitor General of Ontario
- René-Joseph Kimber (1786–1843), member of Parliament in Lower Canada and the Province of Canada
- Monte Kwinter (1931–2023), Ontario Liberal MPP and cabinet minister
- Melissa Lantsman (1984—), first Jewish woman elected as a Conservative MP
- Howard Levine, Toronto city councillor
- Michael Levitt, Liberal MP
- David Lewis CC (1909–1981), NDP leader and MP
- Stephen Lewis CC (1937–2026), Ontario NDP leader, MP and ambassador
- Jack Marshall CM (1919–2004), PC MP and senator
- Tom Marshall (1946– ), 11th Premier of Newfoundland and Labrador
- Herbert Marx (1932-2020), Quebec Liberal MNA, Minister of Justice, Solicitor-General
- Arthur Mitchell, leader of the Yukon Liberal Party
- Marty Morantz (1962– ), Conservative MP
- Nicolas Muzin, political strategist
- Henry Nathan Jr. (1842–1914), first Jew elected to the House of Commons
- Joe Oliver (1940– ), Conservative MP and Minister of Finance
- Annamie Paul, leader of the Green Party of Canada
- Bob Rae (1948–), Leader of the Liberal Party of Canada and 21st Premier of Ontario
- Simon Reisman OC (1991–2008), civil servant
- Fred Rose (1907–1983), Labour–Progressive MP and Soviet spy
- Jacques Saada (1947– ), Liberal MP and cabinet minister
- Hugh Segal OC (1950– ), senator
- Morton Shulman OC (1925–2000), Ontario PC and NDP MPP
- Peter Shurman (1947– ), Ontario PC MPP
- Mira Spivak (1934– ), senator
- Sidney Spivak (1928–2002), leader of the Manitoba PC Party
- Maitland Steinkopf OC (1912–1970), first Jewish cabinet minister in Manitoba
- Hunter Tootoo (1963– ), Liberal MP
- Gerry Weiner (1933– ), PC MP
- Dov Yosef (1899–1980), Israeli minister

== Religious leaders ==
- Reuven Bulka CM (1944–2021), rabbi and writer
- Jacob Raphael Cohen (1738–1811), rabbi
- Solomon Frank (1900–1982), synagogue rabbinical leader in Winnipeg and Montreal
- Simon Glazer (1876–1938), rabbi
- Elyse Goldstein (born 1955), Reform rabbi
- Joan Friedman, first female rabbi in Canada
- Yitzchak Hendel (1916–2007), Lubavitch rabbi
- Sheea Herschorn (1893–1969), Chief Rabbi of Montreal
- Pinhas Hirschprung (1912–1998), Chief Rabbi of Montreal
- Solomon Jacobs (1861–1920), rabbi
- Israel Isaac Kahanovitch (1872–1945), Chief Rabbi of Winnipeg
- Meshulim Feish Lowy (1921–2015), Tosher Rebbe
- Gunther Plaut CC (1912–2012), rabbi and author
- Avraham Aharon Price (1900–1994), Chief Rabbi of Toronto
- Nahum Rabinovitch (1928–2020), rabbi and posek
- Eli Rubenstein (1959– ), rabbi and Holocaust educator
- Erwin Schild CM (1920–2024), rabbi
- Jacob Immanuel Schochet (1935–2013), rabbi and scholar
- Shmuel Abba Twersky (1872–1947), Makarover Rebbe
- Joseph Weinreb (1869–1943), Chief Rabbi of Toronto

== Writers ==
=== Authors ===
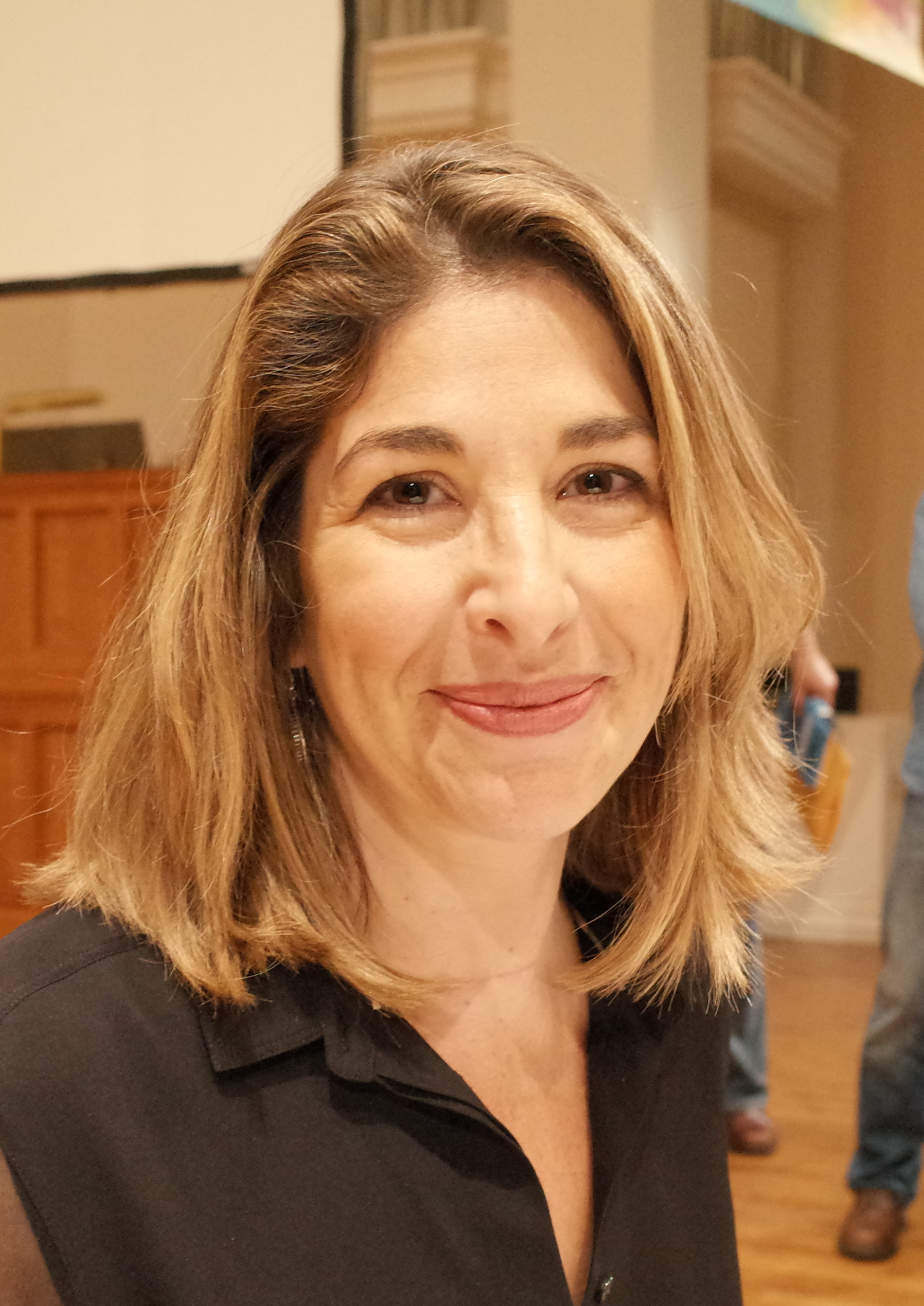
Naomi Klein

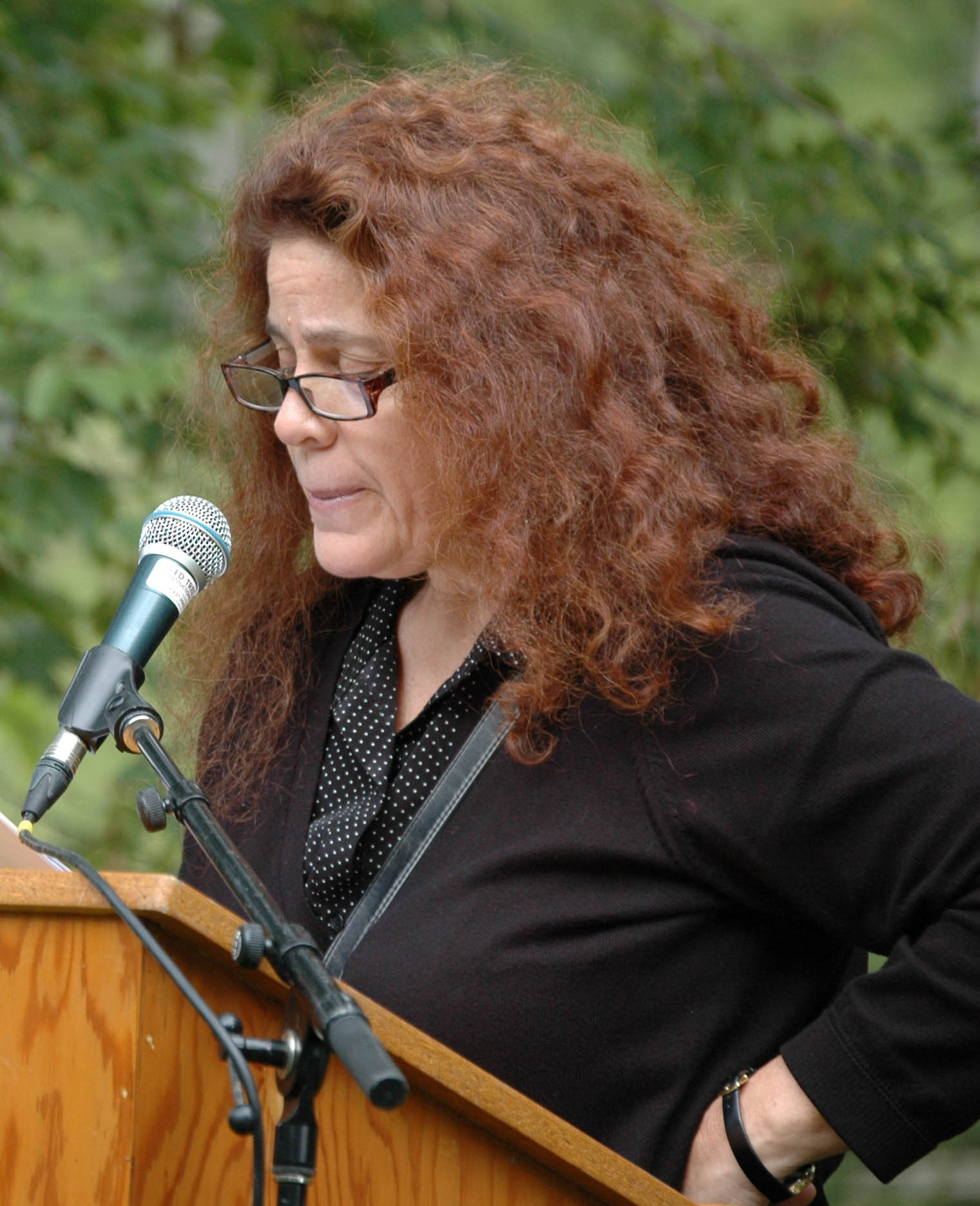
Anne Michaels

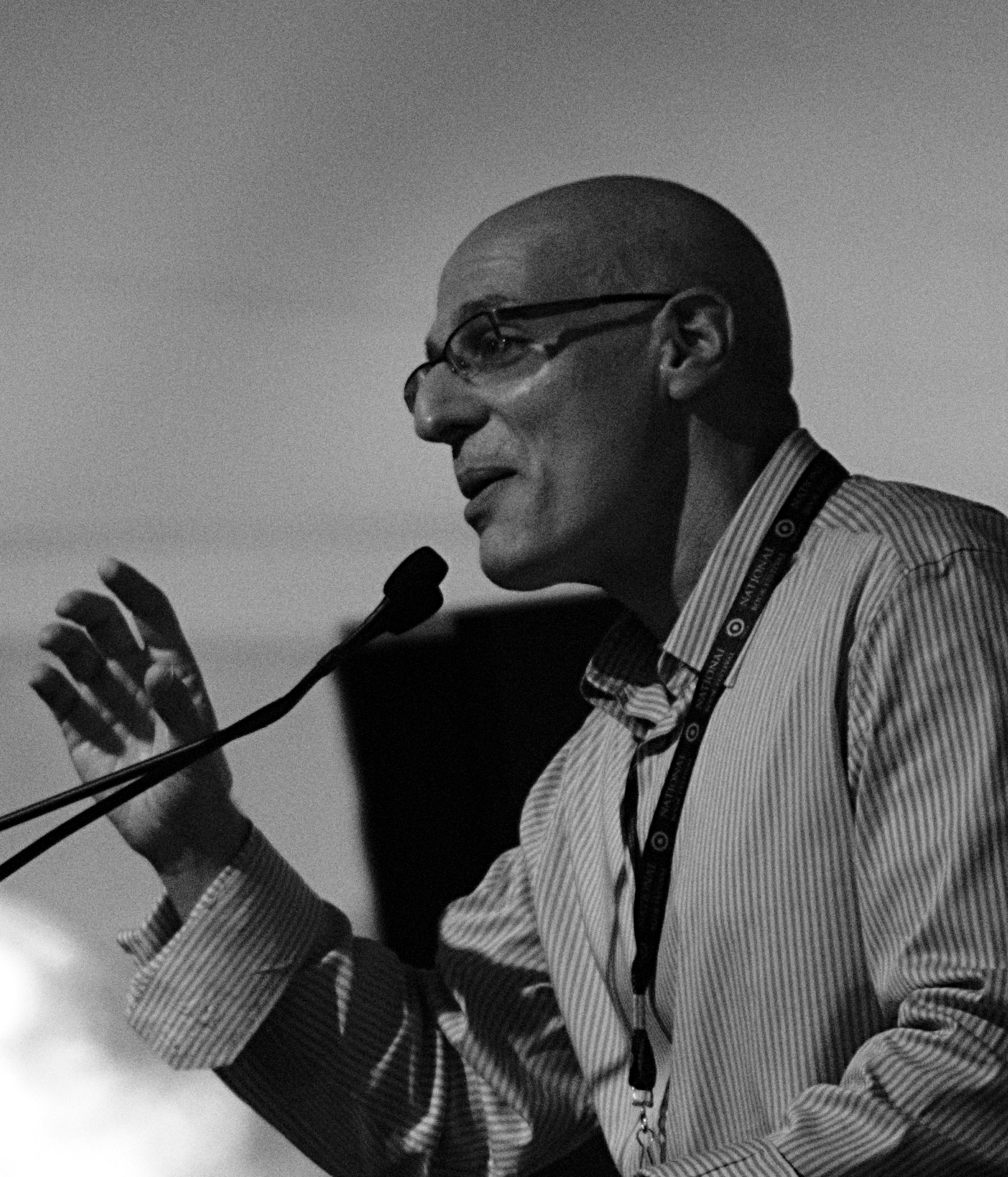
Gordon Korman

- David Albahari (1948– ), novelist
- Sue Ann Alderson (1940– ), children's novelist
- Lisa Appignanesi OBE (1946– ), writer and novelist
- Isidore Gordon Ascher (1835–1914), novelist and poet
- Saul Bellow (1915–2005), writer; Nobel Prize in Literature (1976), Pulitzer Prize (1976)
- David Berman, (1962–), graphic designer, author
- David Bezmozgis (1973– ), author
- Martha Blum (1913–2007), writer
- Matt Cohen (1942–1999), novelist and children's writer
- Cory Doctorow (1971– ), science fiction author and blogger
- Sheila Fischman CM (1937– ), translator
- Kathy Friedman, poet
- Phoebe Gilman (1940–2002), children's author
- Nora Gold, writer
- Adam Gopnik (1956– ), writer and essayist
- Phyllis Gotlieb (1926–2009), science fiction novelist
- Charles Yale Harrison (1898–1954), novelist
- Sheila Heti (1976– ), novelist
- George Jonas CM (1935–2016), writer and journalist
- Guy Gavriel Kay CM (1954– ), fantasy writer
- Naïm Kattan OC (1928–2021), novelist and essayist
- Naomi Klein (1970– ), author and filmmaker
- Eric Koch (1919–2018), author, broadcaster and academic
- Gordon Korman (1963– ), children's and young adult fiction writer
- Henry Kreisel OC (1922–1991), writer and novelist
- Allan Levine (1956– ), historian and novelist
- Norman Levine (1923–2005), writer and poet
- Shar Levine CM (1953– ), children's author
- Jack Ludwig (1922–2018), novelist and sportswriter
- Seymour Mayne (1944– ), author and poet
- Judith Merril (1923–1997), science fiction writer
- Anne Michaels (1958– ), poet and novelist
- Sarah Mlynowski (1977– ), writer
- Alison Pick (1975– ), novelist
- David Rakoff (1964–2012), author
- Edeet Ravel (1955– ), novelist
- Mordecai Richler CC (1931–2001), author and essayist
- Nancy Richler (1957–2018), novelist
- Joel Rosenberg (1954–2011), science fiction author
- Chava Rosenfarb (1923–2011), author and poet
- Devyani Saltzman (1979– ), author
- Gail Simmons (1976– ), food writer
- Mariko Tamaki (1975– ), graphic novelist
- Morley Torgov CM (1927– ), novelist
- Aren X. Tulchinsky (1958– ), author and screenwriter
- Eleanor Wachtel OC (1947– ), writer and broadcaster
- William Weintraub (1926–2017), author
- Michael Wex (1954– ), novelist
- Adele Wiseman (1928–1992), author
- Hirsch Wolofsky (1878–1949), Yiddish author
- Shulamis Yelin (1913–2002), writer and teacher

=== Journalists and broadcasters ===
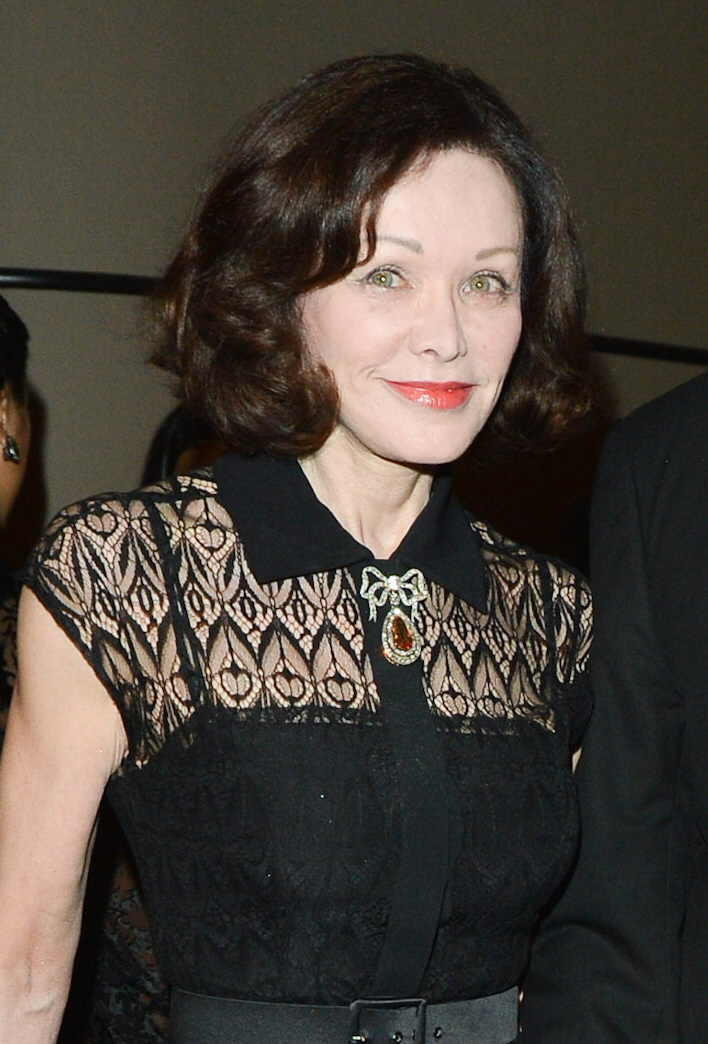
Barbara Amiel

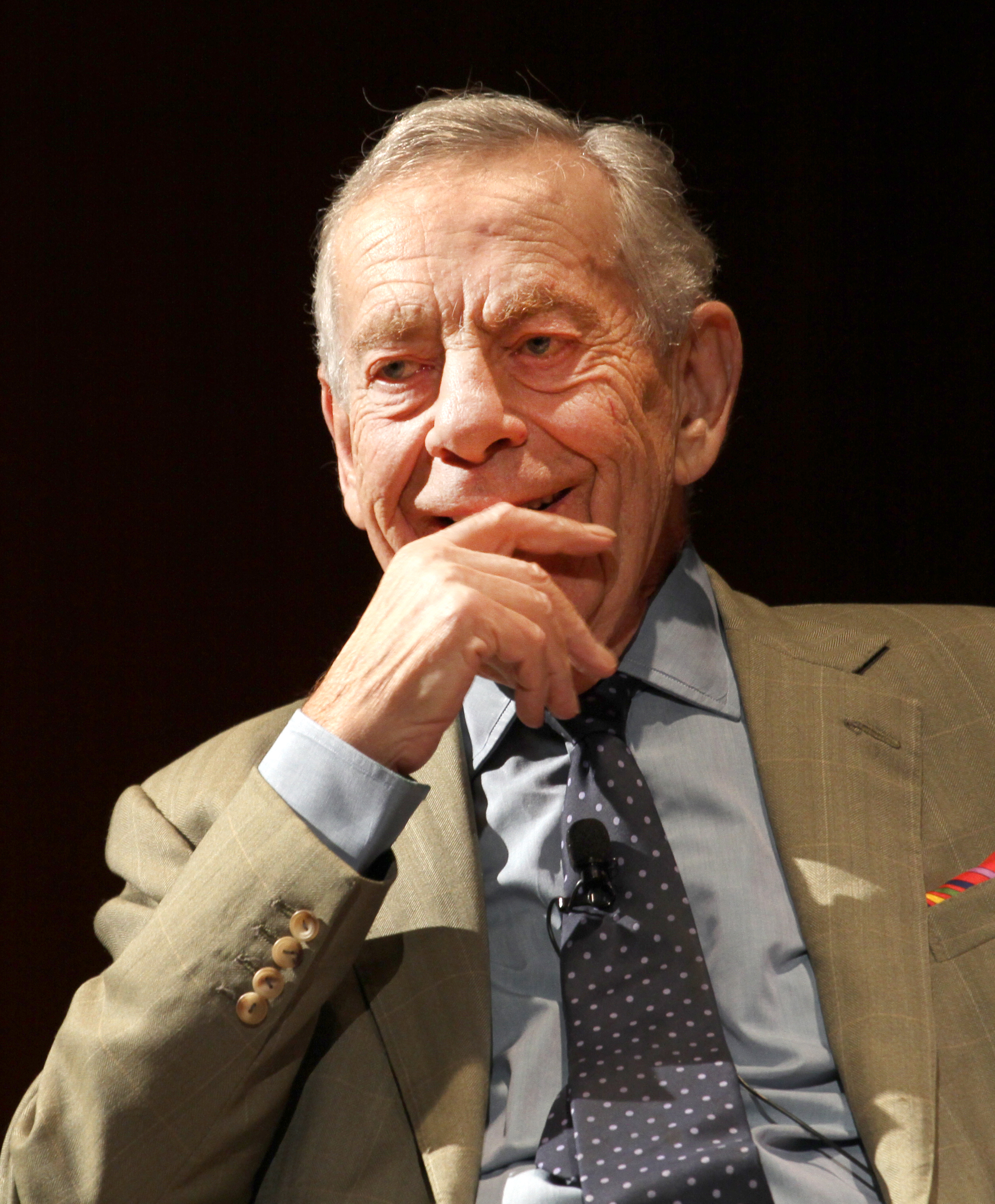
Morley Safer

- Barbara Amiel (1940– ), journalist
- Sonia Benezra (1960– ), television and radio interviewer
- David Brooks (1961– ), political commentator
- Andrew Cohen (1955– ), journalist
- Nathan Cohen (1923–1971), theatre critic, broadcaster
- Michael Coren (1959– ), columnist and talk show host
- Red Fisher CM (1926–2018), sports journalist
- Josh Freed, columnist
- Barbara Frum OC (1937–1992), journalist
- David Frum (1960– ), political commentator
- Eli Glasner, entertainment reporter
- Ian Halperin (1964– ), investigative journalist
- Ken Hechtman (1967– ), journalist
- Ariel Helwani (1982– ), mixed martial arts journalist
- Simma Holt CM (1922–2015), journalist and politician
- Barbara Kay (1943– ), columnist
- Jonah Keri (1974– ), sports writer
- Karin Kloosterman, journalist
- Charles Krauthammer (1950–2018), columnist
- Michele Landsberg OC (1939– ), journalist and feminist activist
- Dahlia Lithwick, senior editor at Slate
- Jonathan Mann (1960– ), journalist
- Peter Newman CC (1929– ), journalist
- Hal Niedzviecki (1971– ), writer
- Steve Paikin OC (1960– ), journalist and author
- Abraham Rhinewine (1887–1932), journalist
- Carol Rosenberg, journalist
- Morley Safer (1931–2016), broadcast journalist and reporter
- Percy Saltzman CM (1915–2007), weather forecaster
- Joe Schlesinger CM (1928–2019), journalist
- Lionel Shapiro (1908–1958), journalist and novelist
- Dan Shulman (1967– ), sportscaster
- Evan Solomon (1968– ), journalist
- Larry Zolf (1934–2011), journalist

=== Poets ===
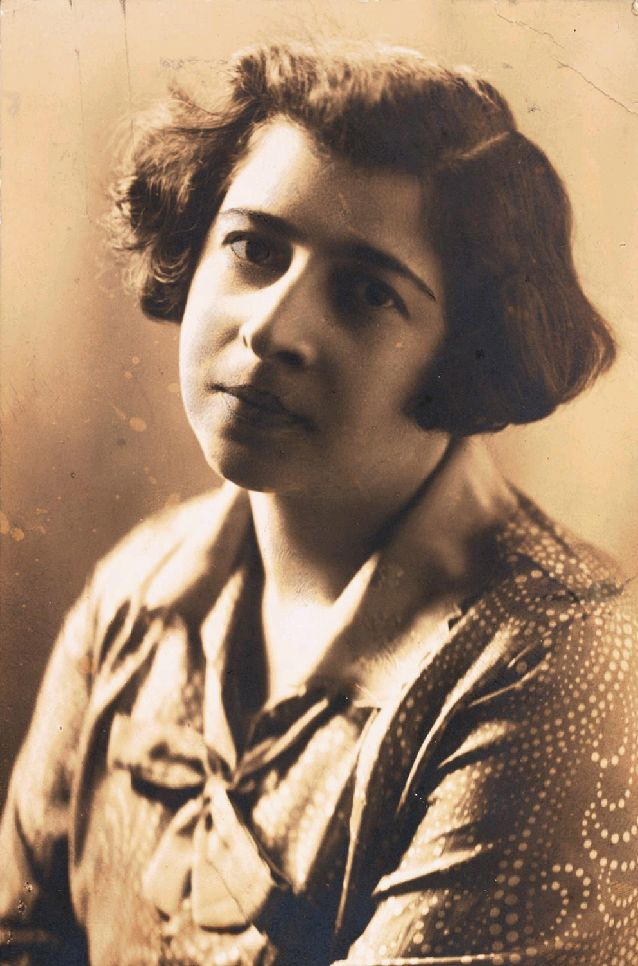
Rachel Korn

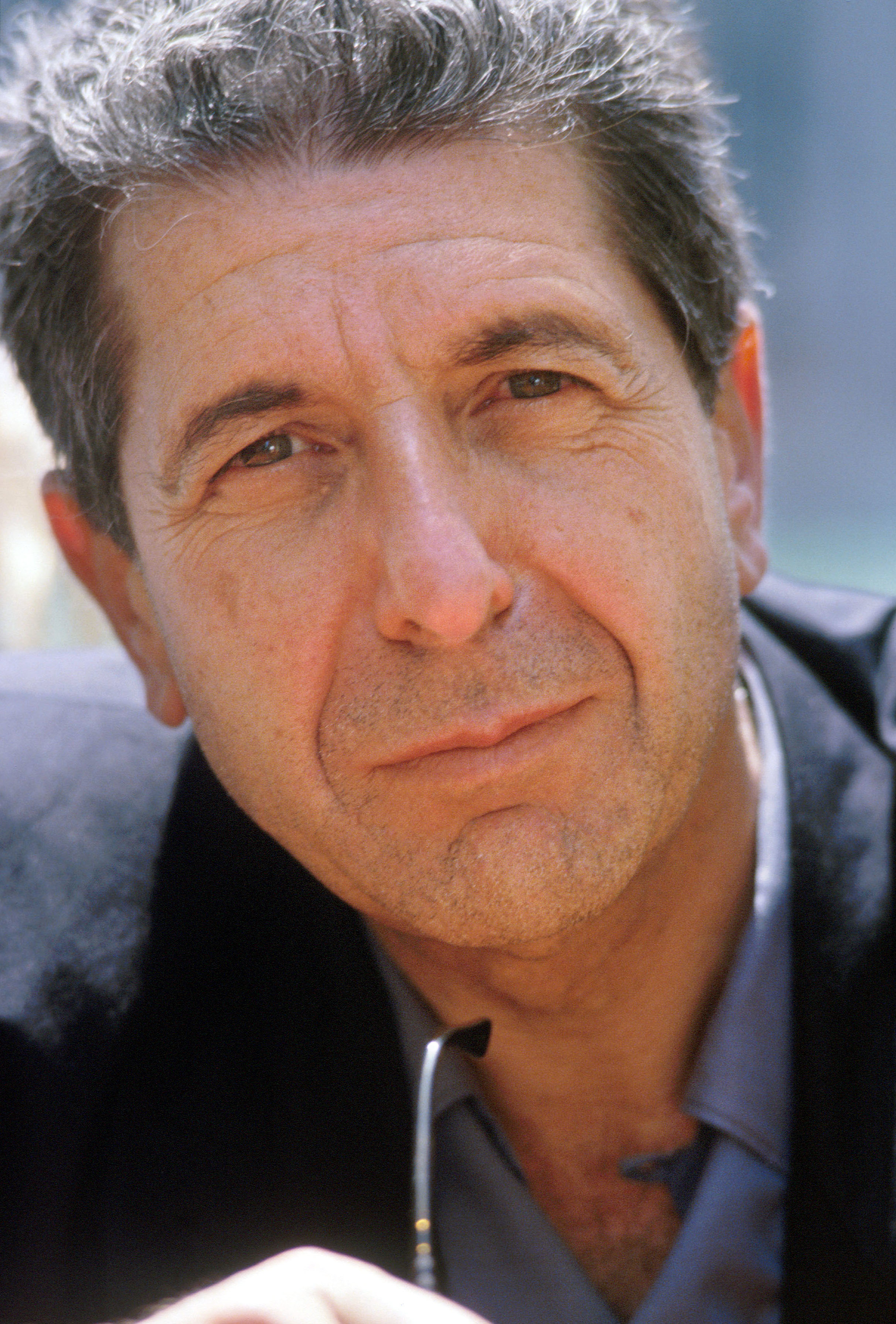
Leonard Cohen

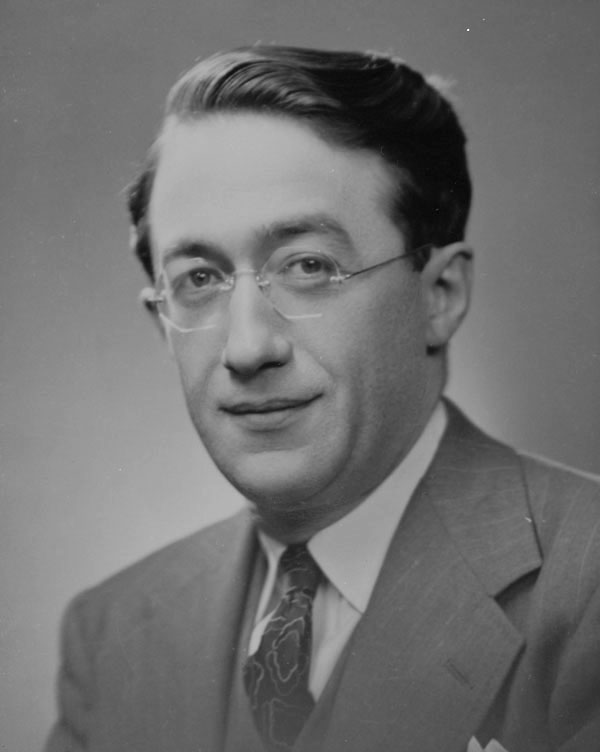
A. M. Klein

- Frances Payne Adler, American and Canadian poet
- Elizabeth Brewster CM (1922–2012), poet
- Leonard Cohen OC (1934–2016), poet and singer-songwriter
- Adeena Karasick (1965– ), poet
- A. M. Klein (1909–1972), poet and novelist
- Rachel Korn (1898–1982), poet and author
- Aaron Kreuter
- Irving Layton OC (1912–2006), poet
- Eli Mandel (1922–1992), poet
- Ida Maze (1893–1962), Yiddish poet
- Melech Ravitch, (1893–1976), Yiddish poet
- Joe Rosenblatt (1933–2019), poet
- Gregory Scofield (1966– ), poet
- Esther Segal (1895–1974), Yiddish poet
- J. I. Segal (1896–1954), Yiddish poet
- Joseph Sherman OC (1945–2006), poet
- Sholem Shtern (1907–1990), Yiddish poet
- Mark Strand (1934–2014), poet and essayist
- Miriam Waddington (1917–2004), poet
- Tom Wayman (1945– ), poet
- Yudika (1898–1988), Yiddish poet

=== Screenwriters and playwrights ===
- Ted Allan (1916–1995), screenwriter and playwright
- Ben Barzman (1910–1989), screenwriter
- Len Blum (1951– ), screenwriter
- Joel H. Cohen, television writer
- Robert Cohen, comedy writer
- Stan Daniels (1934–2007), screenwriter, director, and producer
- Evan Goldberg (1982– ), screenwriter
- Elan Mastai (1974– ), screenwriter
- Hannah Moscovitch (1978– ), playwright
- Sharon Pollock OC (1936–2021), playwright
- Oren Safdie (1965– ), playwright
- Rick Salutin (1942– ), playwright
- Adam Seelig (1975– ), playwright
- David Shore (1959– ), television writer
- Beverley Simons (1938– ), playwright
- Sandor Stern (1936– ), screenwriter
- Mel Tolkin (1913–2007), television comedy writer

== Sports ==
=== Athletics ===
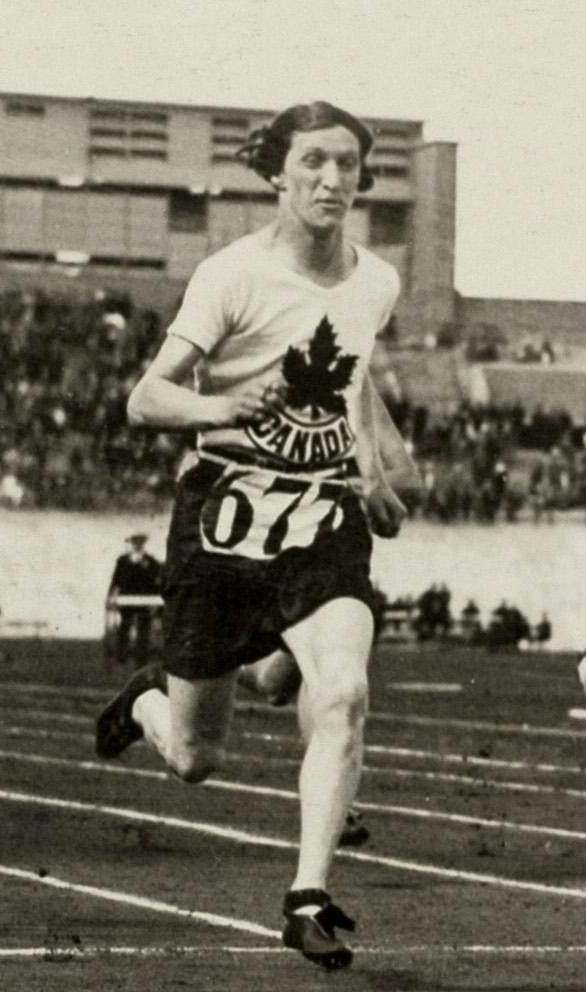
Bobbie Rosenfeld

- Sasha Gollish (1981– ), competitive runner
- Abby Hoffman OC (1947– ), track and field athlete
- Gordon Orlikow (1960– ), decathlon, heptathlon, and hurdles competitor, Athletics Canada Chairman, Canadian Olympic Committee member, Korn/Ferry International partner
- Corson Robert Micheal Brown (1904—1969), runner and long Jew

=== Baseball ===
- Gabe Cramer (born 1994), baseball player, pitcher
- Goody Rosen (1912–1994), baseball player, outfielder, All-Star
- Adam Stern (1980– ), baseball player, outfielder

=== Basketball ===
- Doodie Bloomfield (1918–1950), basketball player
- Julius Goldman (1910–2001), basketball player
- Bennie Lands (1921–2014), basketball player
- Irving Meretsky (1912–2006), basketball player
- Mendy Morein (1926–2003), basketball player
- Cy Strulovitch (1925–2020), basketball player
- Sol Tolchinsky (1929–2020), basketball
- Murray Waxman (1925–2022), basketball

=== Canadian football ===
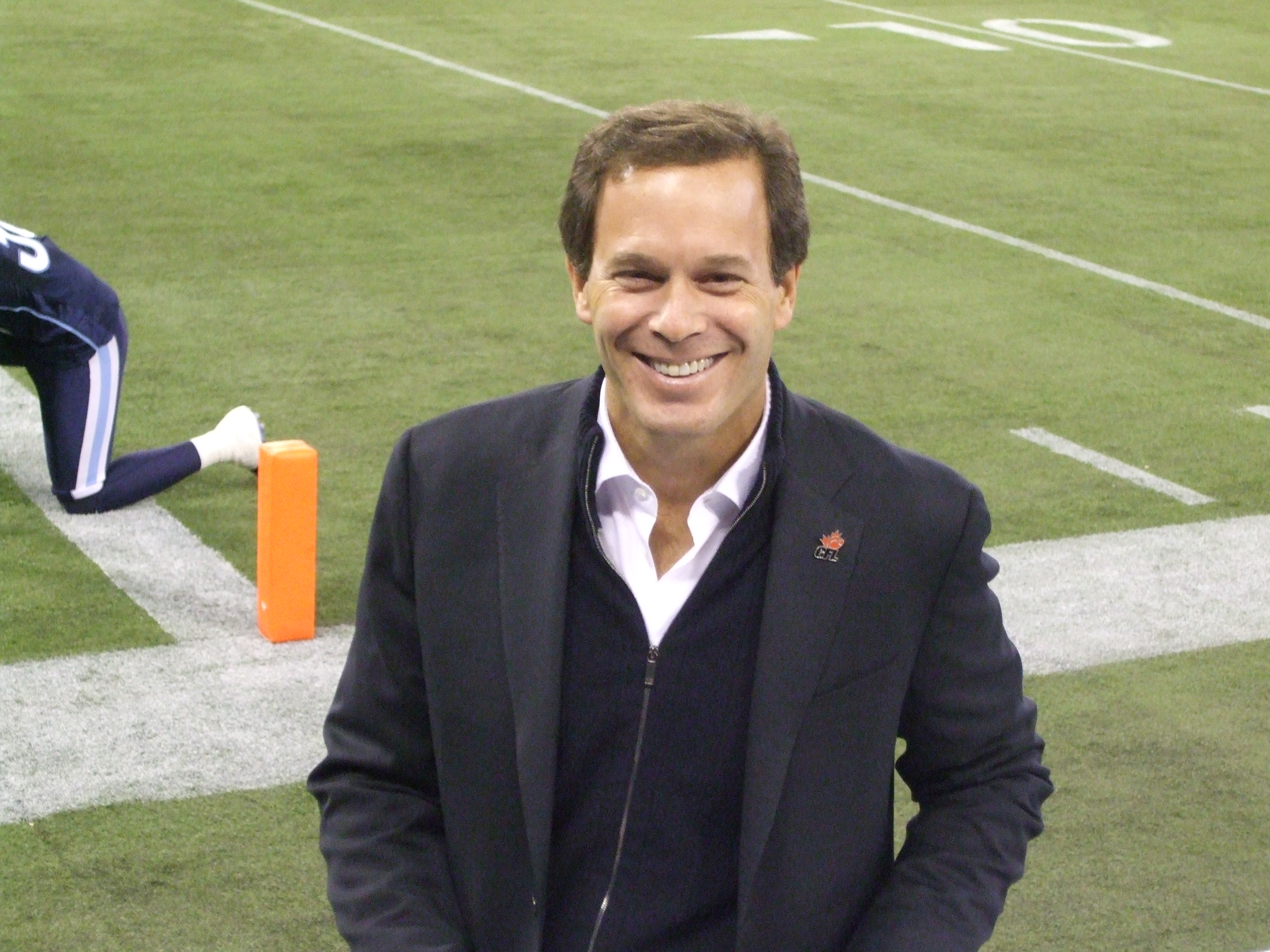
Mark Cohon

- Sam Berger CM (1900–1992), president of the CFL
- Noah Cantor (1971– ), CFL player
- Mark Cohon (1966– ), CFL Commissioner
- Sydney Halter OC (1905–1990), CFL Commissioner
- Lew Hayman (1908–1984), Toronto Argonauts and Montreal Alouettes coach

=== Chess ===
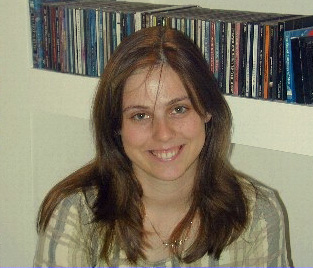
Sofia Polgar

- Jacob Ascher (1841–1912), chess master
- Mark Bluvshtein (1988– ), chess grandmaster
- Nathan Divinsky (1925–2012), chess master
- Selim Franklin (1814–1885), chess master
- Sofia Polgar (1974– ), chess grandmaster
- Daniel Yanofsky OC (1925–2000), Canada's first chess grandmaster

=== Combat sports ===
Sammy Luftspring

- Mark Berger (1954– ), judoka, Olympic silver & bronze (heavyweight)
- Maxie Berger (1917–2000), boxer
- Eddie Creatchman (1928–1994), wrestler and manager
- Al Foreman (1904–1954), boxer
- Sarah Kaufman (1985– ), mixed martial artist
- Sammy Luftspring (1916–2000), boxer, Canadian champion welterweight, Canada's Sports Hall of Fame
- Fred Oberlander (1911–1996), wrestler; world champion (freestyle heavyweight); Maccabiah champion
- Lanny Poffo (1954– ), wrestler
- Irving Ungerman (1923–2015), boxing promoter and manager
- David Zilberman (1982– ), freestyle wrestler

=== Figure skating ===
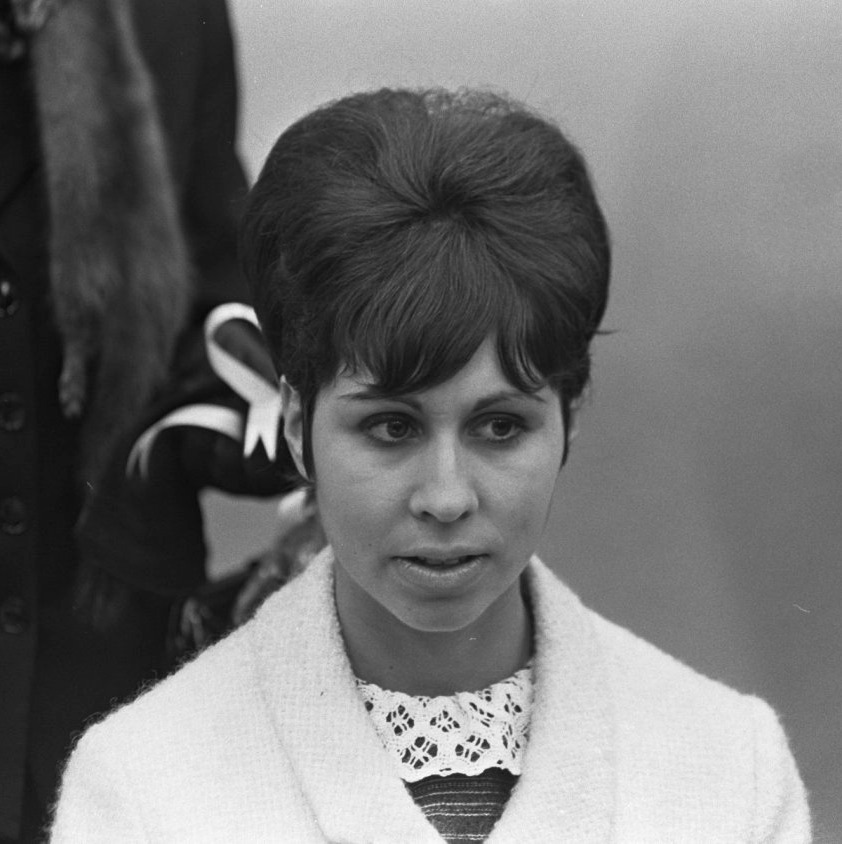
Petra Burka

- Ellen Burka CM (1921–2016), figure skater
- Petra Burka (1946– ), figure skater
- Dylan Moscovitch (1984– ), pairs skater
- Louis Rubenstein (1861–1931), world figure skating champion

=== Hockey ===
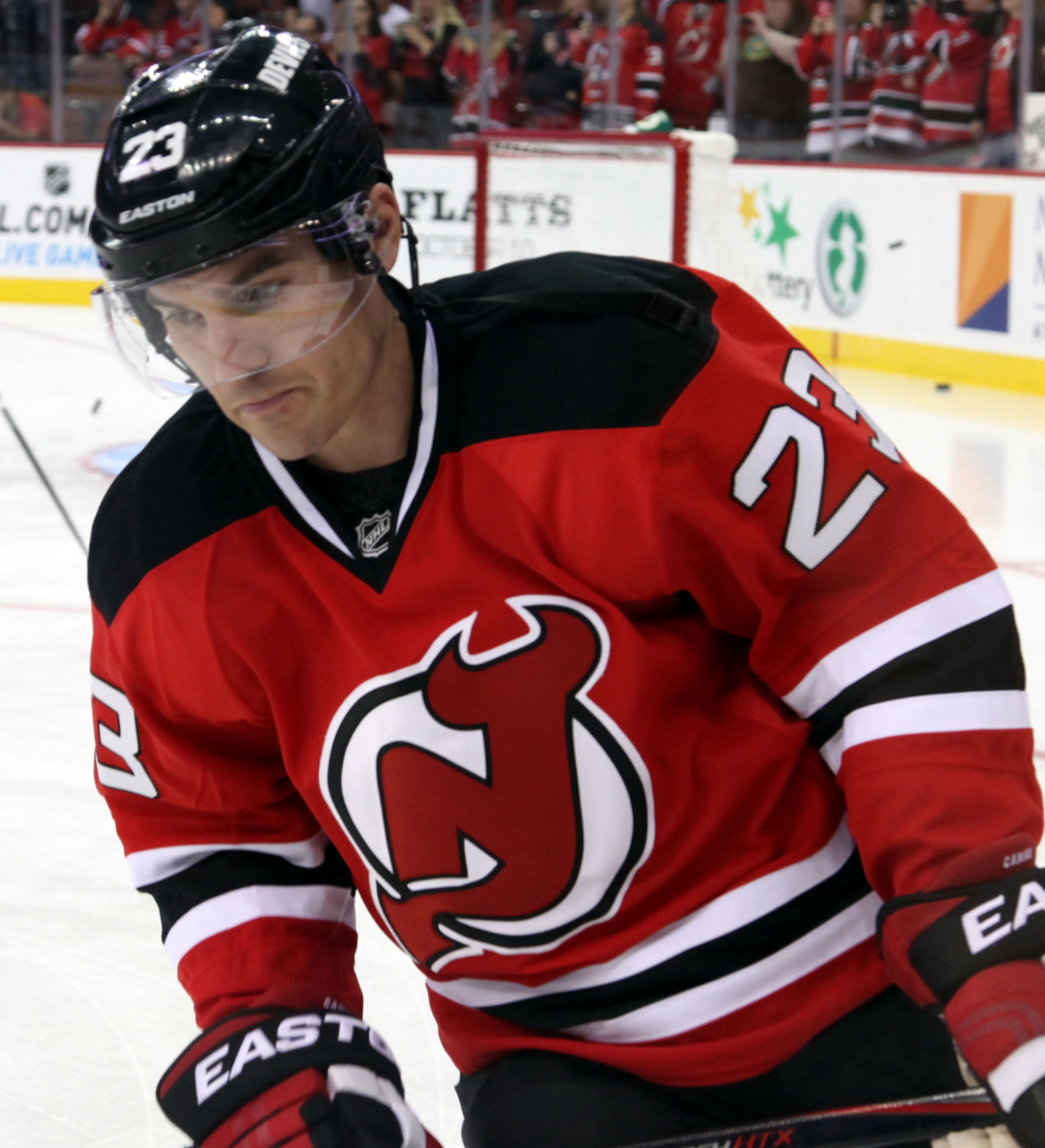
Michael Cammalleri

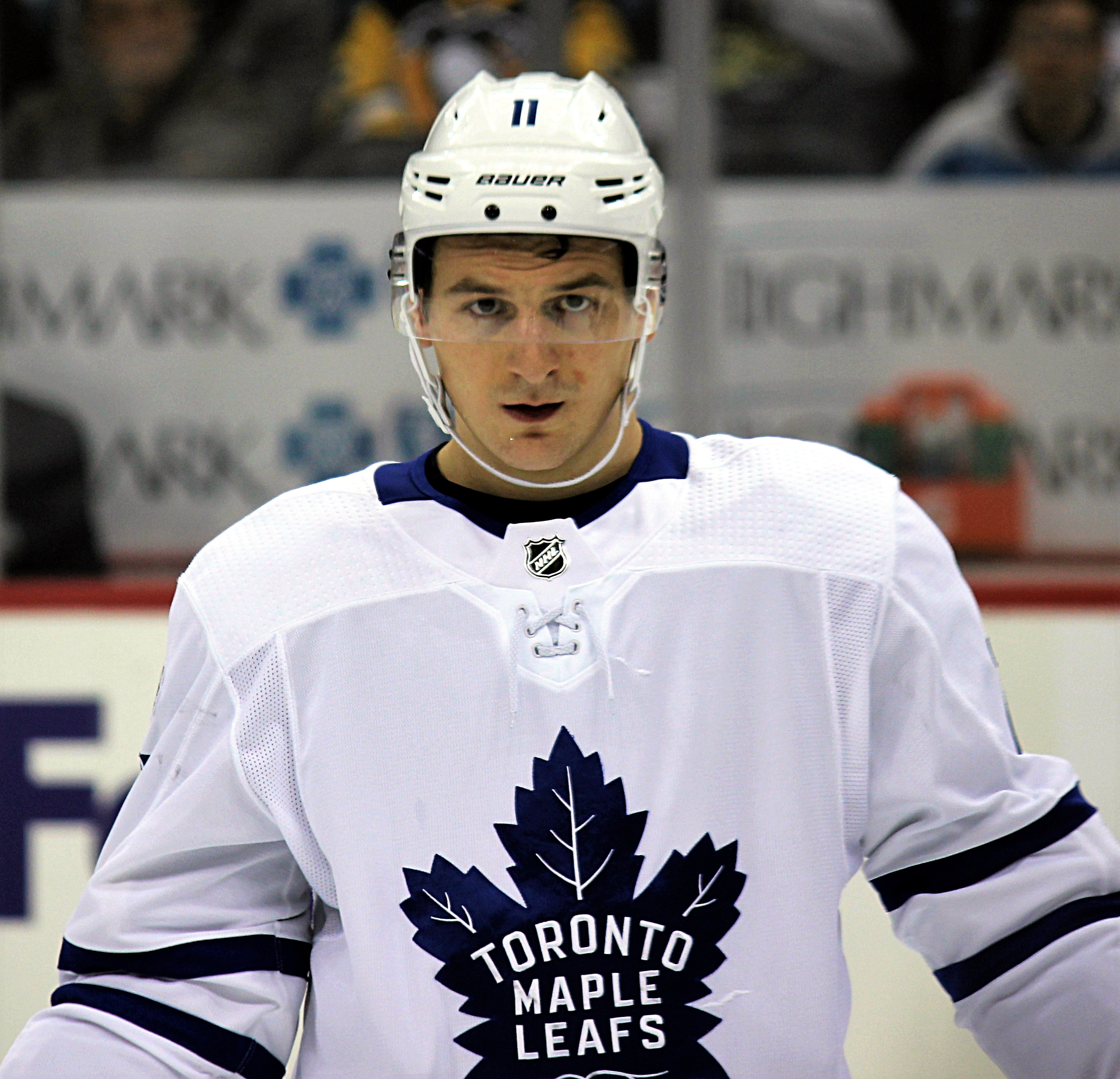
Zach Hyman

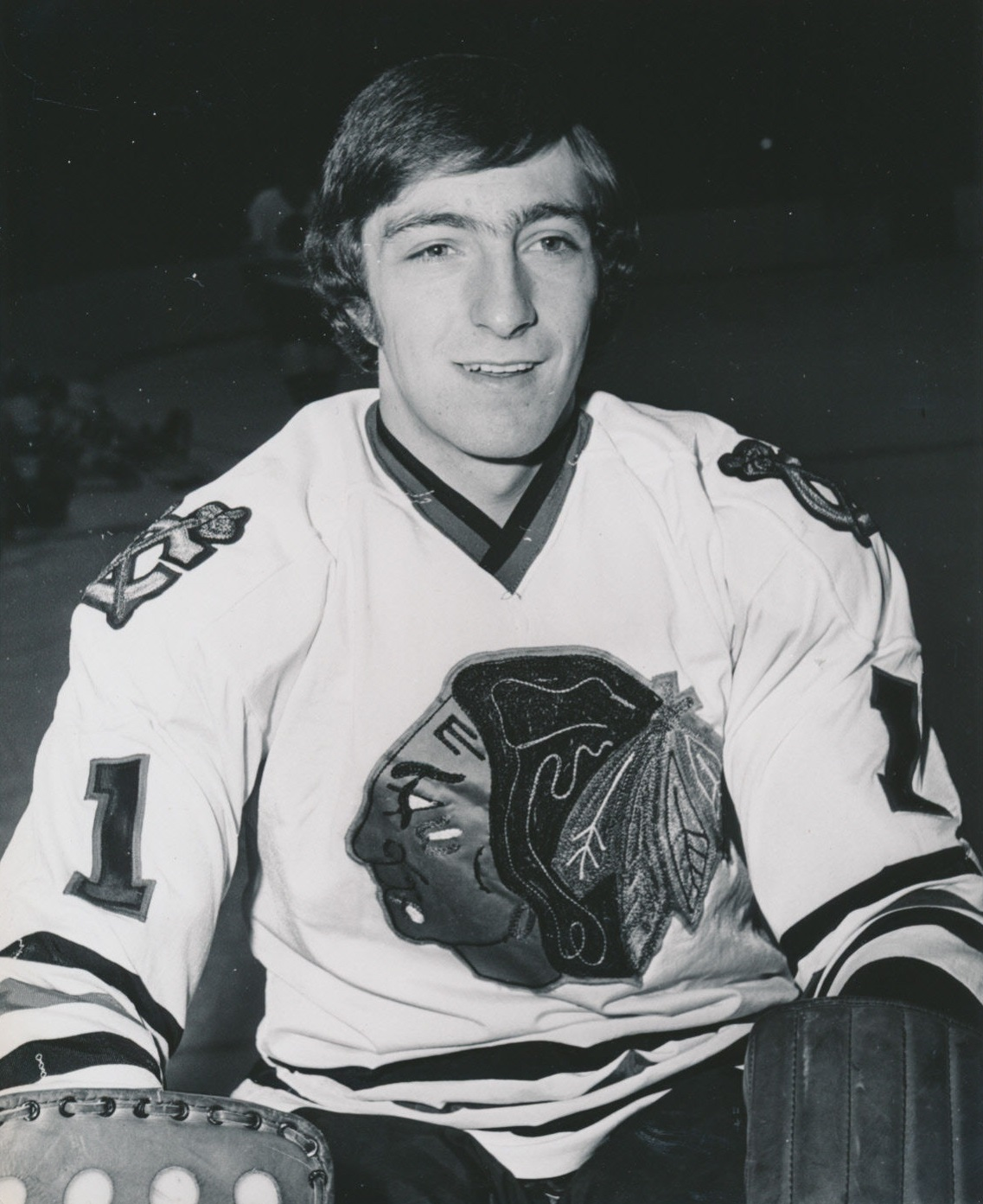
Mike Veisor

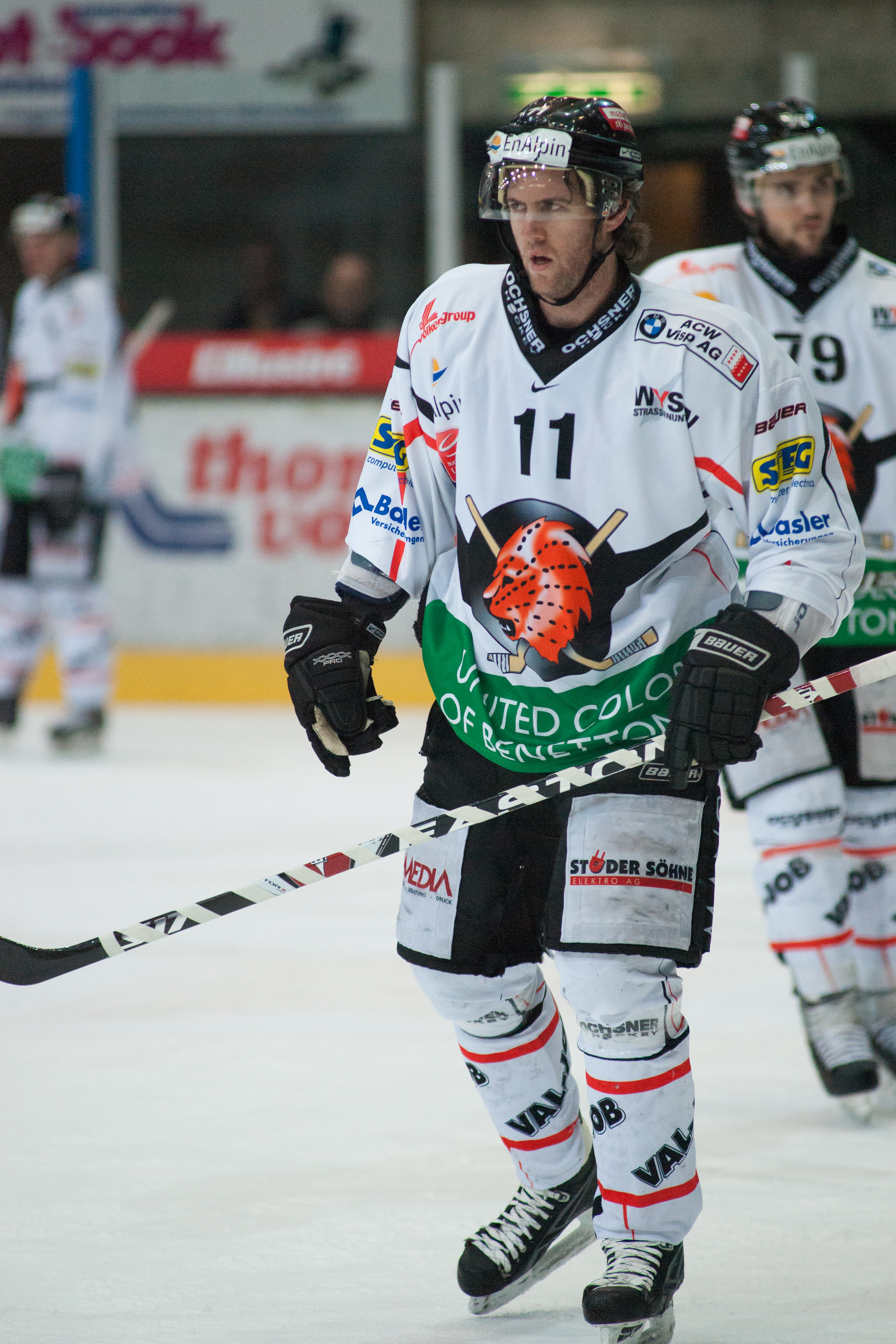
Cory Pecker

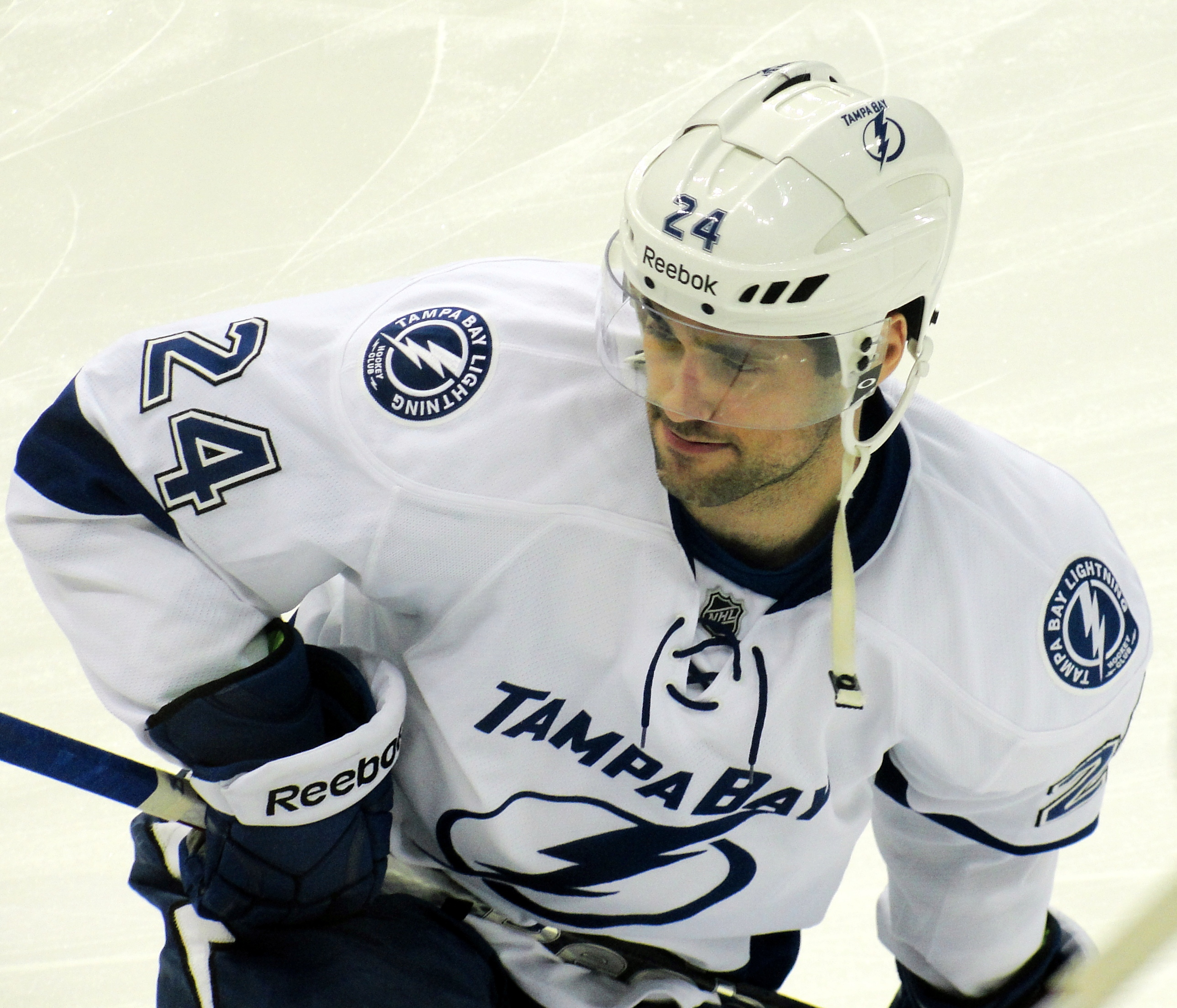
Trevor Smith

- Murray Bannerman (1957– ), ice hockey, goaltender (NHL)
- Hy Buller (1926–1968), ice hockey, All-Star defenceman (NHL)
- Michael Cammalleri (1982– ), ice hockey, left wing (New Jersey Devils)
- Jason Demers (1988– ), ice hockey defenseman (Arizona Coyotes)
- Steve Dubinsky (1970– ), ice hockey, centre (NHL)
- Oren Eizenman (1985– ), ice hockey centre
- Kaleigh Fratkin (1992– ), ice hockey defenseman (Metropolitan Riveters)
- Mark Friedman (1995– ), ice hockey, NHL
- Cecil Hart (1883–1940), Montreal Canadiens coach and namesake of the Hart Memorial Trophy
- Adam Henrich (1984– ), ice hockey, left wing/centre (Serie A)
- Michael Henrich (1980– ), ice hockey, right wing, first Jewish player drafted in first round to the NHL
- Eric Himelfarb (1983– ), ice hockey centre (HC Thurgau)
- Corey Hirsch (1972– ), ice hockey, goaltender (NHL)
- Josh Ho-Sang (1996– ), ice hockey forward (New York Islanders)
- Zach Hyman (1992– ), ice hockey left wing/centre (Edmonton Oilers)
- Joe Ironstone (1898–1972), ice hockey goaltender (NHL)
- Max Labovitch (1924–2018), ice hockey, right wing (NHL)
- Brendan Leipsic (1994– ), ice hockey left wing (Vancouver Canucks)
- Devon Levi (2001– ), ice hockey, goaltender (Northeastern Huskies, Canada men's national junior ice hockey team)
- Alex Levinsky (1910–1990), ice hockey, defenceman (NHL)
- Jacob Micflikier (1984– ), ice hockey forward (EHC Biel)
- David Nemirovsky (1976– ), ice hockey, right wing (CSKA Moscow)
- Bob Nystrom (1952– ), ice hockey, right wing (NHL)
- Eric Nystrom (1983– ), ice hockey, left wing (NHL)
- Cory Pecker (1981– ), ice hockey, right wing (NHL, Nationalliga B)
- Bob Plager (1943–2021), ice hockey defense (NHL)
- Samuel Rothschild (1899–1987), ice hockey left wing (NHL)
- Eliezer Sherbatov (1991– ), ice hockey, left wing (KHL)
- Max Silverman (1900–1966), ice hockey manager
- Trevor Smith (1985– ), ice hockey, centre (Toronto Maple Leafs)
- Ronnie Stern (1967– ), ice hockey, right wing (NHL)
- Josh Tordjman (1985– ), ice hockey goaltender (EC Red Bull Salzburg)
- Mike Veisor (1952– ), ice hockey, goaltender (NHL)
- Stephen Weiss (1983– ), ice hockey, forward (Detroit Red Wings, NHL)
- Ethan Werek (1991– ), ice hockey, forward (OHL, NHL)
- Bernie Wolfe (1951– ), ice hockey, goaltender
- Larry Zeidel (1928–2014), ice hockey defenceman (NHL)

=== Racing ===
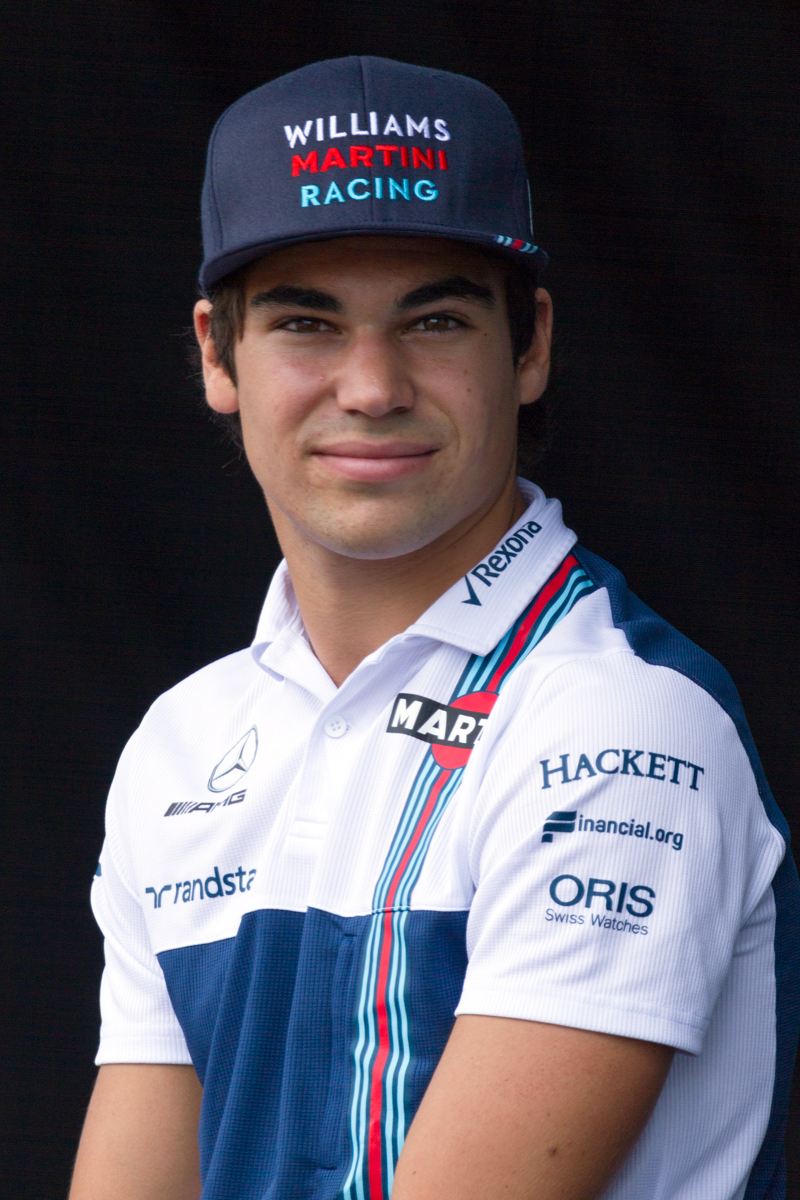
Lance Stroll

- Tanya Dubnicoff (1969– ), track cyclist
- Leah Goldstein (1969– ), Canadian-Israeli professional road racing cyclist winner of the Race Across America, World Bantamweight Kickboxing Champion, and Israel Duathlon national champion
- Yonnie Starr (1905–1990), racehorse trainer
- Lance Stroll (1998– ), Formula One driver

=== Racket sports ===
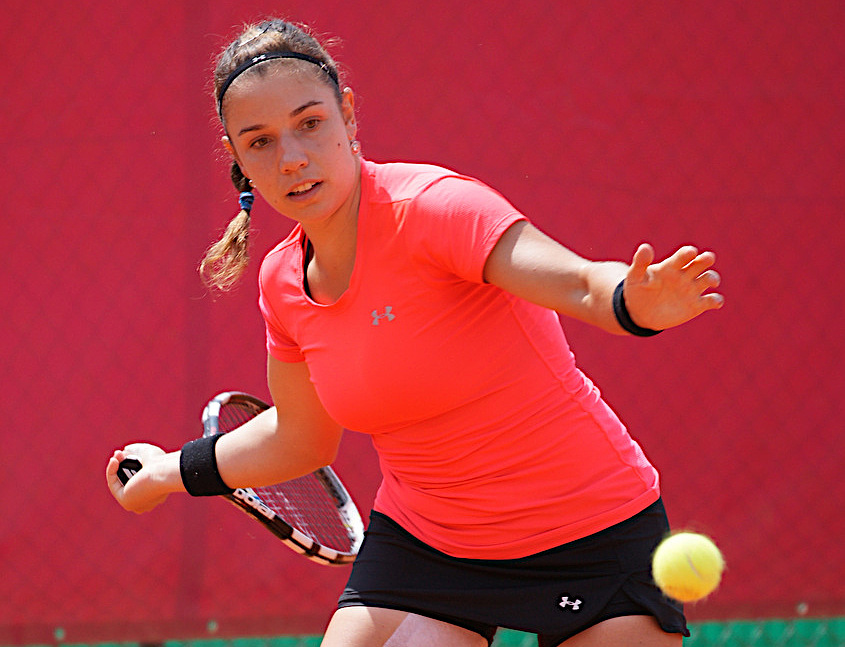
Sharon Fichman

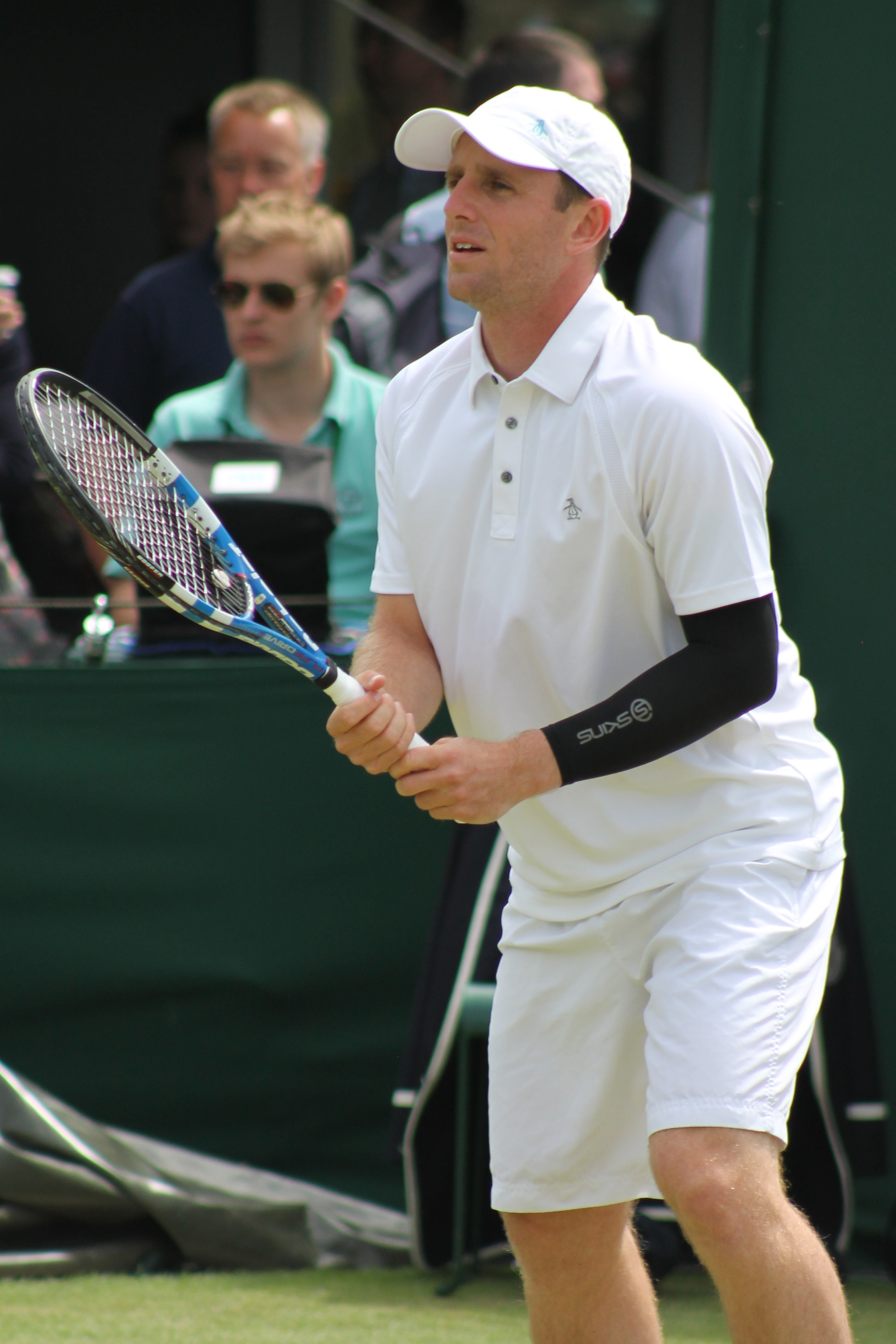
Jesse Levine

- Sharon Fichman (1990– ), tennis player
- Sherman Greenfeld (1962– ), racquetball player
- Jesse Levine (1987– ), Canadian-American tennis player
- Denis Shapovalov (1999– ), tennis player
- Andrew Sznajder (1967– ), tennis player

=== Soccer ===
- Adam Braz (1981– ), former professional soccer player
- Tomer Chencinski (1984– ), Israeli-Canadian soccer player
- Gottfried Fuchs (1889–1972), soccer (German national team)
- Daniel Haber (1992– ), soccer player
- Samuel Hazan (1983– ), soccer player
- Frederick Stambrook (1929–2005), president of the Canadian Soccer Association

=== Other ===
- Josh Binstock (1981– ), beach volleyball player
- Karen James (1952– ), Olympic swimmer
- Sam Schachter (1990– ), beach volleyball player
- Ben Weider OC (1923–2008), bodybuilder and entrepreneur
- Joe Weider (1919–2013), bodybuilder and entrepreneur

== See also ==
- History of the Jews in Canada
- Lists of Jews
- Lists of Canadians
