= List of Jewish Canadian politicians =

This list comprises Jewish people, who have been elected to the federal House of Commons, legislative assemblies of provinces and territories, and members appointed to the Senate.

The first Jewish Canadian politician elected after Confederation was Henry Nathan Jr., elected as a Liberal MP to the House of Commons in a by-election in 1871. Both George Benjamin and Selim Franklin were elected in pre-Confederation Canada and are therefore not listed.

There have been 45 Jewish Canadians who have served as Members of Parliament, as well as 20 who have been named Senators. After the 2015 Canadian election, the highest number of Jews were elected to Parliament in history – with 7 MPs (2.1% of the House of Commons). Elected in the 2021 Canadian Federal Election, Melissa Lantsman became the ninth currently-serving Jewish MP. Of the current federal Jewish politicians, 6 are Liberals (6 MPs, 0 Senators), 3 are Conservatives (2 MPs, 1 Senators), 1 is a New Democrat (1 MP, 0 Senators) and two sit as Independent (2 Senators).

Provincially, Jews have been elected to 9 of the 13 legislatures – with only New Brunswick, Prince Edward Island, Northwest Territories and Nunavut never having Jewish representation. There are currently four Jews serving in three provincial legislatures. Of those members, three are Conservative (two Progressive Conservative, one United Conservative) and one is Liberal (one Quebec Liberal).

There has never been a Jewish Prime Minister of Canada. Dave Barrett remains the only Jewish Premier (of British Columbia, 1972-1975), although Bob Rae (Premier of Ontario 1990-1995) has very strong family ties to Judaism (though he has never converted himself).

== Federal ==
=== House of Commons ===
Member of Parliament	Riding	Took office	Left office	Party	Ref.	Note
Henry Nathan Jr. (1842–1914)	Victoria District	November 24, 1871	January 21, 1874	Liberal		
Samuel William Jacobs (1871–1938)	Cartier	December 17, 1917	August 21, 1938	Liberal		
Abraham Albert Heaps (1885–1954)	Winnipeg North	October 29, 1925	March 25, 1940	CCF		Winnipeg City Councillor (1917–1925), founding member of the CCF (1932), previously Labour/Ginger Group (1925–1932)
Samuel Factor (1892–1962)	Spadina	July 28, 1930	June 10, 1945	Liberal		Toronto City Councillor (1926–1928)
Peter Bercovitch (1879–1942)	Cartier	November 7, 1938	December 26, 1942	Liberal		Quebec MNA (1916–1938)
Fred Rose (1907–1983)	Cartier	August 9, 1943	January 30, 1947	Labor-Progressive		
David Croll (1900–1991)	Spadina	June 11, 1945	July 27, 1955	Liberal		Mayor of Windsor (1931–1934, 1939–1940); Ontario MPP (1934–1943); Senator (1955–1991)
Maurice Hartt (1895–1950)	Cartier	March 31, 1947	March 15, 1950	Liberal		Quebec MLA (1939–1947)
Leon Crestohl (1900–1963)	Cartier	June 19, 1950	March 21, 1963	Liberal		
Herb Gray (1931–2014)	Windsor West	June 18, 1962	January 14, 2002	Liberal		Leader of the Opposition (1990); Deputy Prime Minister (1997–2002); Solicitor General (1993–1997); President of the Treasury Board (1982–1984); Minister of Industry (1980–1982); Minister of Consumer Affairs (1972–1974); Minister of National Revenue (1970–1972)
David Lewis (1909–1981)	York South	June 18, 1962	April 7, 1963	NDP		Leader of the NDP (1971–1975)
David Lewis (1909–1981)	York South	November 8, 1965	July 7, 1974	NDP		Leader of the NDP (1971–1975)
David Orlikow (1918–1998)	Winnipeg North	June 18, 1962	November 20, 1988	NDP		Manitoba MLA (1958–1962); Winnipeg School Trustee (1945–1950); Winnipeg City Councillor (1951–1958)
Marvin Gelber (1912–1990)	York South	April 8, 1963	November 7, 1965	Liberal		
Milton L. Klein (1910–2007)	Cartier	April 8, 1963	June 24, 1968	Liberal		
Max Saltsman (1921–1985)	Waterloo—Cambridge	November 9, 1964	May 21, 1979	NDP		
Barney Danson (1921–2011)	York North	June 25, 1968	May 21, 1979	Liberal		
Bob Kaplan (1936–2012)	York Centre	June 25, 1968	October 24, 1993	Liberal		Solicitor General (1980–1984)
Jack Marshall (1919–2004)	Humber—St. George's—St. Barbe	June 25, 1968	March 22, 1978	Conservative		Senator (1978–1994)
Simma Holt (1922–2015)	Vancouver Kingsway	July 8, 1974	May 21, 1979	Liberal		
David Berger (born 1950)	Saint-Henri—Westmount	May 22, 1979	December 28, 1994	Liberal		
Sheila Finestone (1927–2009)	Mount Royal	September 4, 1984	August 10, 1999	Liberal		Minister for Multiculturalism (1993–1996) / Minister for Status of Women (1993–1996) / Senator (1999–2002)
Gerry Weiner (born 1933)	Pierrefonds—Dollard	September 4, 1984	August 24, 1993	Conservative		Mayor of Dollard-des-Ormeaux (1982–1984); Minister of Multiculturalism and Citizenship (1991–1993)
Dave Barrett (1930–2018)	Esquimalt—Juan de Fuca	November 21, 1988	October 24, 1993	NDP		Premier of British Columbia (1972–1975); British Columbia MLA (1960–1984)
Elinor Caplan (born 1944)	Thornhill	June 2, 1997	June 27, 2004	Liberal		Minister of Citizenship & Immigration (1999–2002); Minister of National Revenue (2002–2003); Ontario MPP (1985–1997); North York City Councillor (1978–1981)
Raymonde Folco (born 1940)	Laval—Les Îles	May 1, 2011		Liberal		
Richard Marceau (born 1970)	Charlesbourg	June 2, 1997	January 22, 2006	Bloc Quebecois		Converted to Judaism in 2004
Jacques Saada (born 1947)	Brossard—La Prairie	June 2, 1997	January 22, 2006	Liberal		Government House Leader (2003–2004); Minister of Democratic Reform (2003–2004); Minister for La Francophonie (2004–2006); Minister for Economic Development (Quebec) (2004–2006)
Irwin Cotler (born 1940)	Mount Royal	November 15, 1999	October 18, 2015	Liberal		Minister of Justice (2003–2006)
Anita Neville (born 1942)	Winnipeg South Centre	November 27, 2000	May 1, 2011	Liberal		
Susan Kadis (born 1953)	Thornhill	June 28, 2004	October 13, 2008	Liberal		
Tony Clement (born 1961)	Parry Sound-Muskoka	January 23, 2006	October 19, 2019	Conservative		Ontario MPP and Provincial Cabinet Minister (1995–2003); Minister of Health (2006–2008); Minister of Industry (2008–2011); President of the Treasury Board (2011–2015)
Mark Adler (born 1963)	York Centre	May 2, 2011	October 18, 2015	Conservative		
Joe Oliver (born 1940)	Eglinton—Lawrence	May 2, 2011	October 18, 2015	Conservative		Minister of Natural Resources (2011–2014); Minister of Finance (2014–2015)
Jim Carr (1951–2022)	Winnipeg South Centre	October 19, 2015	December 22, 2022	Liberal		Minister of Natural Resources (2015–current); Manitoba MLA (1988–1992)
Julie Dabrusin (born 1971)	Toronto—Danforth	October 19, 2015	Incumbent	Liberal		
Karina Gould (born 1987)	Burlington	October 19, 2015	Incumbent	Liberal		Minister of Democratic Institutions (2016–current)
David de Burgh Graham (born 1981)	Laurentides—Labelle	October 19, 2015	October 20, 2019	Liberal		
Anthony Housefather (born 1971)	Mount Royal	October 19, 2015	Incumbent	Liberal		Mayor of Côte Saint-Luc (2005–2015); Côte Saint-Luc City Councillor (1994–2005); Hampstead Town Councillor (1988–1994)
Michael Levitt (born 1970)	York Centre	October 19, 2015	September 1, 2020	Liberal		
Dan Ruimy (born 1962)	Pitt Meadows—Maple Ridge	October 19, 2015	October 20, 2019	Liberal		
Rachel Bendayan (born 1979)	Outremont	February 25, 2019	Incumbent	Liberal		
Marty Morantz (born 1962)	Charleswood—St. James—Assiniboia—Headingley	October 21, 2019	April 27, 2025	Conservative		Winnipeg City Councillor (2014–2018)
Leah Gazan (born 1972)	Winnipeg Centre	October 21, 2019	Incumbent	NDP		
Ya'ara Saks (born 1973)	York Centre	October 26, 2020	April 27, 2025	Liberal		
Melissa Lantsman (born 1984)	Thornhill	September 20, 2021	Incumbent	Conservative		
Ben Carr (born 1986)	Winnipeg South Centre	June 19, 2023	Incumbent	Liberal		
Roman Baber	York Centre	April 28, 2025	Incumbent	Conservative		
Tamara Kronis (born 1974)	Nanaimo—Ladysmith	April 28, 2025	Incumbent	Conservative		
Evan Solomon	Toronto Centre	April 28, 2025	Incumbent	Liberal		

=== Senate ===
Senator	Province	Took office	Left office	Party	Ref.	Note
David Croll (1900–1991)	Ontario	August 28, 1955	July 11, 1991	Liberal		Federal MP (1945–1955)
Lazarus Phillips (1895–1986)	Quebec	February 9, 1968	October 10, 1970	Liberal		
Carl Goldenberg (1907–1996)	Quebec	November 4, 1971	October 20, 1982	Liberal		
Jack Austin (born 1932)	British Columbia	August 19, 1975	March 2, 2007	Liberal		Leader of the Government in the Senate (2003–2006); Minister for Social Development (1982–1984)
Jack Marshall (1919–2004)	Newfoundland and Labrador	March 23, 1978	November 26, 1994	Conservative		Federal MP (1968–1978)
Nathan Nurgitz (1934–2019)	Manitoba	October 3, 1979	February 9, 1993	Conservative		West Kildonan Alderman (1963–1969)
Leo Kolber (1929–2020)	Quebec	December 23, 1983	January 18, 2004	Liberal		
Jerry Grafstein (born 1935)	Ontario	January 13, 1984	January 2, 2010	Liberal		
Mira Spivak (born 1934)	Manitoba	November 17, 1986	July 12, 2009	Independent		Conservative Senator (1986–2004)
Ron Ghitter (born 1935)	Alberta	March 25, 1993	March 31, 2000	Conservative		
Erminie Cohen (1926–2019)	New Brunswick	June 4, 1993	July 23, 2001	Conservative		
Richard Kroft (born 1938)	Manitoba	June 11, 1998	September 24, 2004	Liberal		
Sheila Finestone (1927–2009)	Quebec	August 11, 1999	January 28, 2002	Liberal		Federal MP (1984–1999)
Yoine Goldstein (1934–2020)	Quebec	August 29, 2005	May 11, 2009	Liberal		
Hugh Segal (1950—2023)	Ontario	August 29, 2005	June 15, 2014	Conservative		
Irving Gerstein (born 1941)	Quebec	January 2, 2009	February 10, 2016	Conservative		
Linda Frum (born 1963)	Ontario	August 27, 2009	August 27, 2021	Conservative		
Judith Seidman (born 1950)	Quebec	August 27, 2009	Incumbent	Conservative		
Marc Gold (born 1950)	Quebec	November 25, 2016	Incumbent	Independent		
Paula Simons (born 1964)	Alberta	October 3, 2018	Incumbent	Independent		

== Provincial ==
=== Alberta ===
Member of Legislative Assembly	Riding	Took office	Left office	Province	Ref.	Note
Ron Ghitter (born 1935)	Calgary Buffalo	August 30, 1971	March 13, 1979	Conservative		
Sheldon Chumir (1940–1992)	Calgary-Buffalo	May 8, 1986	January 26, 1992	Liberal		
Karen Leibovici (born 1952)	Edmonton Meadowlark	June 15, 1993	March 11, 2001	Liberal		
Stephen Mandel (born 1945)	Edmonton-Whitemud	September 15, 2014	May 4, 2015	Conservative		Minister of Health (2014–2015); Edmonton City Councillor (2001–2004); Mayor of Edmonton (2004–2013)
Richard Gotfried (born 1958)	Calgary-Fish Creek	May 5, 2015	Incumbent	Conservative		
Ricardo Miranda (born 1976)	Calgary-Cross	May 5, 2015	April 15, 2019	NDP		

=== British Columbia ===
Member of Legislative Assembly	Riding	Took office	Left office	Province	Ref.	Note
Dave Barrett (1930–2018)	Dewdney	September 12, 1960	September 11, 1966	NDP		Premier of British Columbia (1972–1975); Federal MP (1988–1993)
Dave Barrett (1930–2018)	Coquitlam	September 12, 1966	December 10, 1975	NDP		Premier of British Columbia (1972–1975); Federal MP (1988–1993)
Dave Barrett (1930–2018)	Vancouver East	June 3, 1976	June 1, 1984	NDP		Premier of British Columbia (1972–1975); Federal MP (1988–1993)
David Chudnovsky (born 1949)	Vancouver-Kensington	May 17, 2005	May 11, 2009	NDP		
Judy Darcy (born 1949)	New Westminster	May 14, 2013	September 21, 2020	NDP		Minister of Mental Health and Addictions of British Columbia (2017–2020)
George Heyman	Vancouver-Fairview	May 14, 2013	Incumbent	NDP		Minister of Environment and Climate Change Strategy (2017–present)
Selina Robinson (born 1964)	Coquitlam-Maillardville	May 14, 2013	Incumbent	Independent		Minister of Post-Secondary Education and Future Skills (2022–2024); Minister of Finance (2020–2022); Minister of Municipal Affairs and Housing (2017–2020)

=== Manitoba ===
Member of Legislative Assembly	Riding	Took office	Left office	Province	Ref.	Note
Solomon Hart Green (1885–1969)	Winnipeg North	July 11, 1910	July 9, 1914	Liberal		
William Tobias (1892–1941)	Winnipeg	June 28, 1927	June 15, 1932	Conservative		
Marcus Hyman (1883–1938)	Winnipeg	June 16, 1932	December 21, 1938	Independent Labour		
Morris Gray (1889–1966)	Inkster	April 22, 1941	January 22, 1966	NDP		Winnipeg Alderman (1930–1942)
David Orlikow (1918–1998)	St. Johns	June 16, 1958	June 17, 1962	NDP		Manitoba MP (1962–1988); Winnipeg School Trustee (1945–1950); Winnipeg City Councillor (1951–1958)
Saul Cherniack (1917–2018)	St. Johns	December 14, 1962	November 16, 1981	NDP		Minister of Finance (1969–1972, 1973–1975); Winnipeg City Councillor (1959–1962)
Maitland Steinkopf (1912–1970)	River Heights	December 14, 1962	June 22, 1966	Conservative		Minister for Public Utilities (1963–1964)
Sidney Green (born 1929)	Inkster	January 23, 1966	November 16, 1981	Progressive		Minister of Health (1969); Minister of Natural Resources (1969–1972); Minister of Urban Affairs (1971–1972); Minister for Manitoba Development (1973–1977); NDP MLA (1966–1979); Winnipeg City Councillor (1962–1965)
Saul Miller (1917–1993)	Seven Oaks	June 23, 1966	November 16, 1981	NDP		Minister of Colleges and University Affairs (1971–1973); Minister of Urban Affairs (1973–1974), (1974–1976); Minister of Health and Social Development (1974–1974); Minister of Finance (1976–1977)
Sidney Spivak (1928–2002)	River Heights	June 23, 1966	April 12, 1979	Conservative		Manitoba PC Leader (1971–1975); Minister of Industry and Commerce (1966–1969); Minister of Government Services (1978–1979)
Cy Gonick (born 1936)	Crescentwood	June 25, 1969	June 27, 1973	NDP		
Izzy Asper (1932–2003)	Wolseley	June 16, 1972	June 24, 1975	Liberal		Leader of the Manitoba Liberals (1970–1975)
Marty Dolin (1939–2018)	Kildonan	October 1, 1985	April 25, 1988	NDP		
Jim Carr (1951–2022)	Crescentwood	April 26, 1988	September 14, 1992	Liberal		Deputy Leader of the Manitoba Liberals (1988–1992); Federal MP (2015–current)

=== Newfoundland and Labrador ===
Member of House of Assembly	Riding	Took office	Left office	Province	Ref.	Note
Tom Marshall (born 1946)	Humber East	October 21, 2003	November 3, 2014	Conservative		Premier of Newfoundland & Labrador (2014); Minister of Justice (2003–2006); Minister of Finance (2006–2014)

=== Saskatchewan ===
Member of House of Assembly	Riding	Took office	Left office	Province	Ref.	Note
Sam Asbell (1914–1965)	Bengough	April 22, 1964	October 10, 1965	Liberal		Asbell died in office at the age of 50.

=== Nova Scotia ===
Member of Legislative Assembly	Riding	Took office	Left office	Province	Ref.	Note
Percy Gaum (1915–1994)	Cape Breton North	October 30, 1956	October 13, 1970	PC		
Howard Epstein (born 1949)	Halifax Chebucto	March 24, 1998	October 7, 2013	NDP		Halifax City Councillor (1994–1998)

=== Ontario ===
Member of Provincial Parliament	Riding	Took office	Left office	Province	Ref.	Note
Ephraim Frederick Singer (1889–1953)	St. Andrew	October 30, 1929	June 19, 1934	PC		
David Croll (1900–1991)	Windsor—Walkerville	June 19, 1934	August 3, 1943	Liberal		Mayor of Windsor (1931–1934, 1939–1940); Federal MP (1945–1955); Senator (1955–1991)
John Judah Glass (1895–1973)	St. Andrew	June 19, 1934	August 3, 1943	Liberal		
J. B. Salsberg (1902–1998)	St. Andrew	August 4, 1943	June 8, 1955	Labor-Progressive		
Allan Grossman (1910–1991)	St. Andrew—St. Patrick	June 9, 1955	September 17, 1975	PC		Minister of Reform Institutions (1963–1968); Minister of Correctional Services (1968–1971); Minister of Trade (1971–1972); Minister of Revenue (1972–1974)
Vernon Singer (1930–2018)	York Centre	June 11, 1959	September 24, 1963	Liberal		
Vernon Singer (1930–2018)	Downsview	September 25, 1963	October 21, 1971	Liberal		
Vernon Singer (1930–2018)	Wilson Heights	September 18, 1975	June 8, 1977	Liberal		
Stephen Lewis (born 1937)	Scarborough West	September 25, 1963	April 4, 1979	NDP		Ontario NDP Leader (1970–1978); Leader of the Opposition (1975–1977)
Morton Shulman (1925–2000)	High Park	October 17, 1967	September 17, 1975	NDP		
Larry Grossman (1943–1997)	St. Andrew—St. Patrick	September 18, 1975	September 9, 1987	PC		Ontario PC Leader (1985–1987); Minister of Consumer Relations (1977–1978); Minister of Industry (1978–1982); Minister of Health (1982–1983); Minister of Economics (1983–1985); Minister of Education (1985)
Stuart Lyon Smith (1938–2020)	Hamilton West	September 18, 1975	January 24, 1982	Liberal		Liberal Party Leader (1976–1982)
David Rotenberg (1930–2022)	Wilson Heights	June 9, 1977	May 1, 1985	Liberal		Minister of Urban Affairs (1985)
Elinor Caplan (born 1944)	Oriole	May 2, 1985	March 10, 1997	Liberal		Minister of Government Services (1985–1986); Minister of Health (1987–1990); Federal MP (1997–2004)
Monte Kwinter (1931–2023)	York Centre	May 2, 1985	June 6, 2018	Liberal		Minister of Consumer Relations (1985–1987); Minister of Financial Institutions (1986–1987); Minister of Community Safety (2003–2007)
Chaviva Hošek (born 1946)	Oakwood	September 10, 1987	September 5, 1990	Liberal		Minister of Housing (1987–1989)
Charles Harnick (born 1950)	Willowdale	September 6, 1990	June 2, 1999	PC		Attorney General & Minister Responsible for Native Affairs (1995–1999)
Steve Owens (1956–2016)	Scarborough Centre	September 6, 1990	June 7, 1995	NDP		Minister for Education and Training (1994–1995)
Tony Clement (born 1961)	Brampton West—Mississauga; Brampton South (1995–1999)	June 8, 1995	September 2, 2003	PC		Canadian MP and Cabinet Minister (2006–2019); Minister of Transportation (1997–1999); Minister of Environment (1999–2000); Minister of Municipal Affairs and Housing (1999–2001); Minister of Health and Long-Term Care (2001–2003)
David Caplan (1964—2019)	Don Valley East	September 4, 1997	October 5, 2011	Liberal		Minister of Infrastructure (2003–2008); Minister of Health (2008–2009)
Peter Shurman (born 1947)	Thornhill	October 10, 2007	December 31, 2013	PC		
Jonah Schein (born 1974)	Davenport	October 6, 2011	June 11, 2014	NDP		
Gila Martow (born 1961)	Thornhill	February 13, 2014	May 3, 2022	PC		
Roman Baber (born 1980)	York Centre	June 7, 2018	May 3, 2022	Independent; Progressive Conservative (until January 15, 2021)		
Rima Berns-McGown	Beaches—East York	June 7, 2018	May 3, 2022	NDP		
Andrea Khanjin (born 1987)	Barrie—Innisfil	June 7, 2018	Incumbent	PC		Minister of Environment, Conservation and Parks (2023–present)
Michael Kerzner	York Centre	June 2, 2022	Incumbent	PC		Solicitor General (2022–present)

=== Quebec ===
Member of National Assembly	Riding	Took office	Left office	Province	Ref.	Note
Peter Bercovitch (1879–1942)	Montréal–Saint-Louis	May 22, 1916	November 6, 1938	Liberal		Federal MP (1938–1942)
Joseph Cohen (1891–1973)	Montréal–Saint-Laurent	May 16, 1927	August 16, 1936	Liberal		
Maurice Hartt (1895–1950)	Montréal–Saint-Louis	October 25, 1939	March 30, 1947	Liberal		Federal MP (1947–1950)
Harry Blank (born 1925)	Saint-Louis	June 22, 1960	December 1, 1985	Liberal		
Victor Goldbloom (1923–2016)	D'Arcy-McGee	June 5, 1966	November 25, 1979	Liberal		Minister of Municipal Affairs (1973–1976)
Robert Libman (born 1960)	D'Arcy-McGee	September 25, 1989	September 11, 1994	Independent		Leader of the Equality Party (1989–1994); Equality Party MNA (1989–1994)
Lawrence Bergman (born 1940)	D'Arcy-McGee	September 12, 1994	April 22, 2014	Liberal		
Russell Copeman (born 1960)	Notre-Dame-de-Grâce	September 12, 1994	October 21, 2008	Liberal		
David Birnbaum (born 1956)	D'Arcy-McGee	April 23, 2014	Incumbent	Liberal		

=== Yukon ===
Member of Legislative Assembly	Riding	Took office	Left office	Province	Ref.	Note
Arthur Mitchell (born 1950)	Copperbelt	November 21, 2005	October 11, 2011	Yukon		Leader of the Opposition (2006–2011)

== See also ==
- List of Canadian Jews
- List of electoral firsts in Canada
- List of visible minority politicians in Canada
- List of Indigenous Canadian politicians
