= By-elections to the 19th Canadian Parliament =

By-elections to the 19th Canadian Parliament were held to fill vacancies in the House of Commons of Canada between the 1940 federal election and the 1945 federal election. The Liberal Party of Canada led a majority government for the 19th Canadian Parliament.

Seventeen vacant seats were filled through by-elections.

By-election	Date	Incumbent	Party	Winner	Party	Cause	Retained
Grey North	February 5, 1945	William Pattison Telford, Jr.	Liberal	W. Garfield Case	Progressive Conservative	Resignation to provide a seat for Andrew McNaughton	No
Cartier	August 9, 1943	Peter Bercovitch	Liberal	Fred Rose	Labor-Progressive	Death	No
Stanstead	August 9, 1943	Robert Davison	Liberal	Joseph-Armand Choquette	Bloc populaire Canadien	Election declared void	No
Humboldt	August 9, 1943	Harry Raymond Fleming	Liberal	Joseph William Burton	C. C. F.	Death	No
Selkirk	August 9, 1943	Joseph Thorarinn Thorson	Liberal	William Bryce	C. C. F.	Appointed President of the Exchequer Court of Canada	No
Charlevoix—Saguenay	November 30, 1942	Pierre-François Casgrain	Liberal	Frédéric Dorion	Independent	Appointed a Superior Court Judge of Quebec	No
Winnipeg North Centre	November 30, 1942	J. S. Woodsworth	C. C. F.	Stanley Knowles	C. C. F.	Death	Yes
Outremont	November 30, 1942	Thomas Vien	Liberal	Léo Richer Laflèche	Liberal	Called to the Senate	Yes
St. Mary	February 9, 1942	Hermas Deslauriers	Liberal	Gaspard Fauteux	Liberal	Death	Yes
Welland	February 9, 1942	Arthur Damude	Liberal	Humphrey Mitchell	Liberal	Death	Yes
York South	February 9, 1942	Alan Cockeram	National Government	Joseph W. Noseworthy	C. C. F.	Resignation to provide a seat for Arthur Meighen	No
Quebec East	February 9, 1942	Ernest Lapointe	Liberal	Louis St. Laurent	Liberal	Death	Yes
Edmonton East	June 2, 1941	Frederick Clayton Casselman	Liberal	Cora Taylor Casselman	Liberal	Death	Yes
Saskatoon City	August 19, 1940	Walter George Brown	United Reform Movement	Alfred Henry Bence	Conservative	Death	No
Carleton	August 19, 1940	Alonzo Hyndman	National Government	George Russell Boucher	Conservative	Death	Yes
Waterloo North	August 19, 1940	William Daum Euler	Liberal	Louis Orville Breithaupt	Liberal	Called to the Senate	Yes
Kingston City	August 12, 1940	Norman McLeod Rogers	Liberal	Angus Lewis Macdonald	Liberal	Death	Yes

== See also ==
- List of federal by-elections in Canada

== Sources ==
- Parliament of Canada–Elected in By-Elections
