= By-elections to the 20th Canadian Parliament =

By-elections to the 20th Canadian Parliament were held to fill vacancies in the House of Commons of Canada between the 1945 federal election and the 1949 federal election. The Liberal Party of Canada led a working majority government for the 20th Canadian Parliament, though was technically a minority government during World War II.

Shortly before the dissolution of the 20th Canadian Parliament, Newfoundland joined Confederation as the tenth province. Unlike the case when the provinces such as Manitoba, British Columbia and Prince Edward Island joined, by-elections were not called to fill the new province's seven seats.

Eighteen vacant seats were filled through by-elections.

By-election	Date	Incumbent	Party	Winner	Party	Cause	Retained
Nicolet—Yamaska	February 7, 1949	Lucien Dubois	Independent Liberal	Renaud Chapdelaine	Progressive Conservative	Death	No
Carleton	December 20, 1948	George Russell Boucher	Progressive Conservative	George A. Drew	Progressive Conservative	Resignation to provide a seat for Drew	Yes
Laval—Two Mountains	December 20, 1948	Liguori Lacombe	Independent	Léopold Demers	Liberal	Resignation	No
Marquette	December 20, 1948	James Allison Glen	Liberal	Stuart Sinclair Garson	Liberal	Resignation	Yes
Digby—Annapolis—Kings	December 13, 1948	James Lorimer Ilsley	Liberal	George Clyde Nowlan	Progressive Conservative	Resignation	No
Algoma East	October 25, 1948	Thomas Farquhar	Liberal	Lester B. Pearson	Liberal	Called to the Senate	Yes
Rosthern	October 25, 1948	Walter Adam Tucker	Liberal	William Albert Boucher	Liberal	Resignation	Yes
Ontario	June 8, 1948	W. E. N. Sinclair	Liberal	Arthur Henry Williams	CCF	Death	No
Vancouver Centre	June 8, 1948	Ian Alistair Mackenzie	Liberal	Rodney Young	CCF	Called to the Senate	No
Yale	May 31, 1948	Grote Stirling	Progressive Conservative	Owen Lewis Jones	CCF	Resignation	No
York—Sunbury	October 20, 1947	H. Francis G. Bridges	Liberal	Milton Gregg	Liberal	Death	Yes
Halifax	July 14, 1947	William Chisholm Macdonald	Liberal	John Dickey	Liberal	Death	Yes
Cartier	March 31, 1947	Fred Rose	Labor-Progressive	Maurice Hartt	Liberal	Seat declared vacant by resolution of the House of Commons	No
Richelieu—Verchères	December 23, 1946	Arthur Cardin	Independent	Gérard Cournoyer	Liberal	Death	No
Parkdale	October 21, 1946	Herbert A. Bruce	Progressive Conservative	Harold Timmins	Progressive Conservative	Resignation	Yes
Portage la Prairie	October 21, 1946	Harry Leader	Liberal	Calvert Charlton Miller	Progressive Conservative	Death	No
Pontiac	September 16, 1946	Wallace McDonald	Liberal	Réal Caouette	Social Credit	Death	No
Glengarry	August 6, 1945	William B. MacDiarmid	Liberal	William Lyon Mackenzie King	Liberal	Resignation to provide a seat for Mackenzie King	Yes

== See also ==
- List of federal by-elections in Canada

== Sources ==
- Parliament of Canada–Elected in By-Elections
