= 1943 Cartier federal by-election =

- August 9, 1943

Riding of Cartier
- Turnout: 19,030
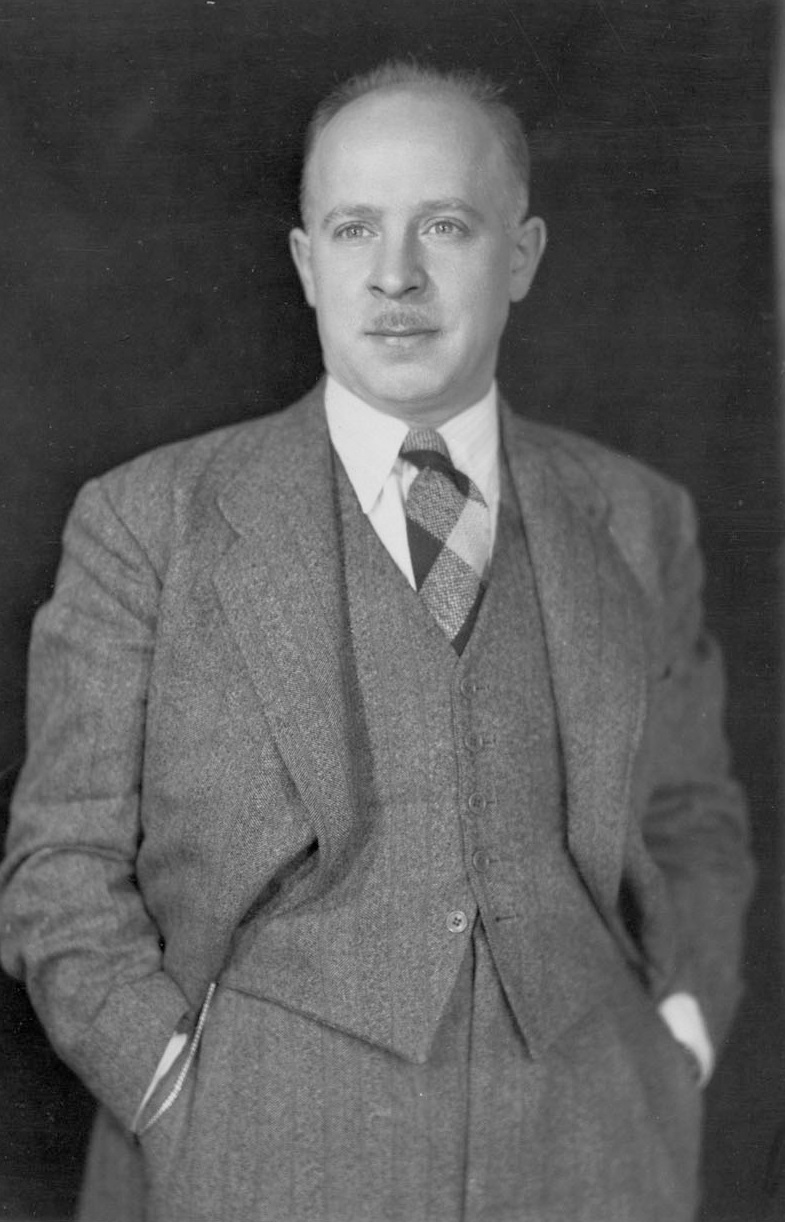

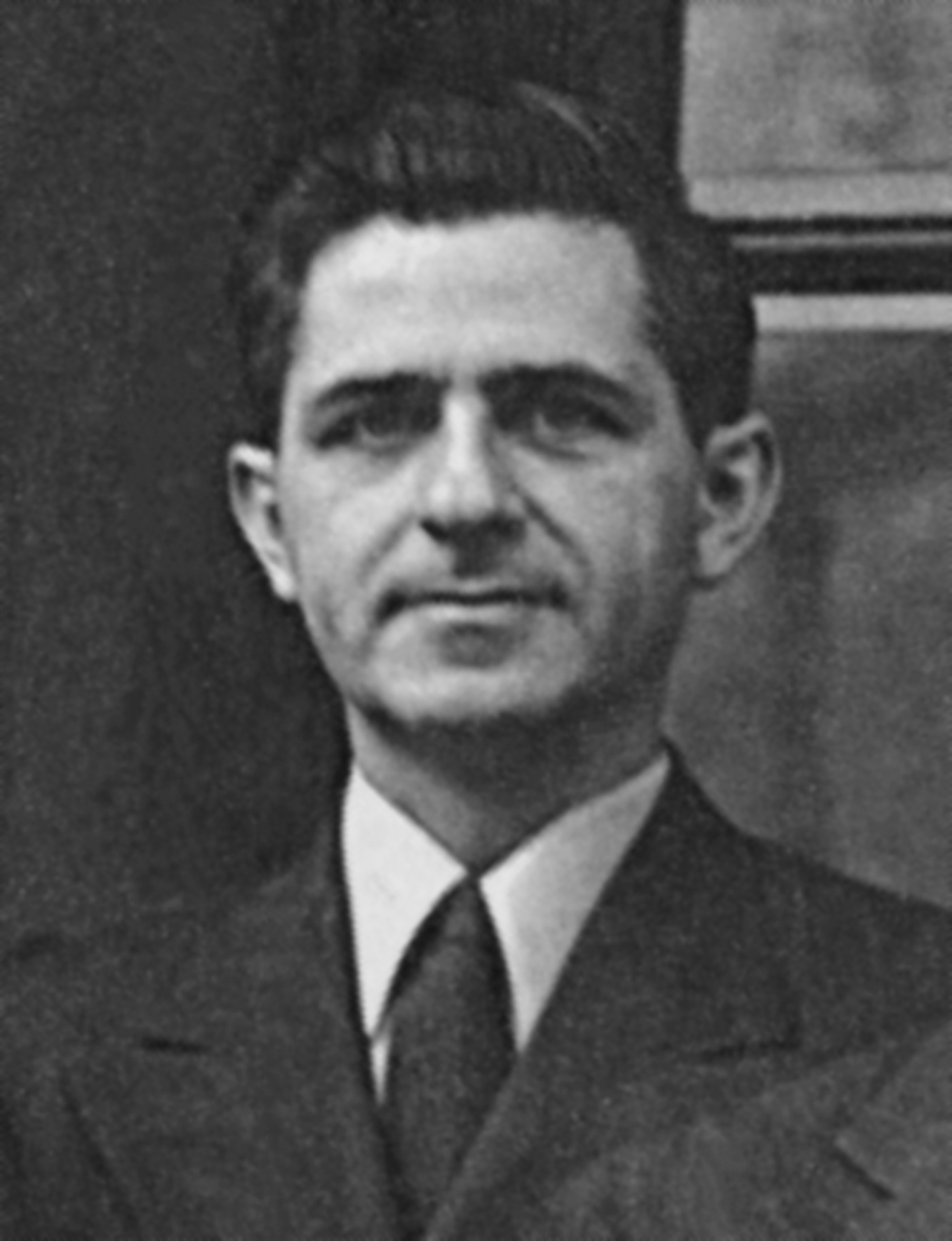
	First party	Second party
		BP
Candidate	Fred Rose	Paul Masse
Party	Labour Progressive (Note: The Labor-Progressive Party was the legal front of the Communist Party of Canada from 1943 to 1959.)	Bloc populaire
Popular vote	5,789	5,639
Percentage	30.42	29.63
Swing	–	–
	Third party	Fourth party
	LPC
Candidate	Lazarus Phillips	David Lewis
Party	Liberal	Co-operative Commonwealth
Popular vote	4,180	3,313
Percentage	21.97	17.41
Swing	▼66.57pp	–
MP before election
Peter Bercovitch
Liberal
Elected MP
Fred Rose
Labor-Progressive

A federal by-election was held in the riding of Cartier on August 9, 1943 to replace Peter Bercovitch, following his death on December 26, 1942. The by-election was held on the same day as three other federal by-elections for the seats of Humboldt, Selkirk, and Stanstead. The election was won by the Labor-Progressive candidate Fred Rose, who became the second of two members of the Communist Party of Canada to be elected to the House of Commons of Canada. Rose was later convicted of treason and expelled from the House for aiding Soviet espionage in Canada.

== Background ==
Peter Bercovitch had been the Liberal member of Parliament for Cartier since a 1938 by-election. While serving his second term in the House of Commons, Bercovitch died on office on December 26, 1942. The riding of Cartier was an apparent Liberal stronghold, with the Liberals winning more than 50% of the vote share in each election since the riding's establishment in 1925. In the most recent 1940 general election, Bercovitch won his re-election with 88% of the vote share, although his only opponent was a candidate from the minor National Labour Party. However, the riding had also seen relatively strong performances from far-left candidates, with the Socialist Party of Canada earning 7% in 1926, and Communist Party of Canada member Fred Rose earning the second-most votes with 16% of the vote share in 1935.

=== Candidates ===
Following the call of the election, the Liberals decided to run Lazarus Phillips, a Montreal-based lawyer in the by-election. The Labor-Progressive Party, which was the legal front of the banned Communist Party of Canada, selected Fred Rose as their candidate. Rose had previously run for the Cartier seat in the 1935 federal election, where he was a runner-up to longtime Liberal MP Samuel William Jacobs. The Co-operative Commonwealth Federation (CCF), which had not contested the riding of Cartier since the party's establishment, nominated their own national secretary David Lewis. The Progressive Conservatives decided not to nominate a candidate for the by-election.

== Aftermath ==
Fred Rose won the by-election by a margin of 3.8% over Paul Masse of the anti-conscription Bloc populaire. Fred Rose joined fellow Communist Party member Dorise Nielsen in the House of Commons.

The Liberals were thoroughly defeated, falling to third place after a 66.6% decrease in their vote share from 1940. Along with the simultaneous by-elections held in Humboldt, Selkirk, and Stanstead, the result was considered to be a rebuff of William Lyon Mackenzie King's wartime government, as all four of the Liberal-held seats were lost to opposition parties.

Rose was re-elected in the 1945 federal election, but did not complete his second term as he was expelled from the House on January 30, 1947. His expulsion occurred after he was convicted of Soviet espionage against Canada on June 16, 1946. The Liberals won back the seat in the subsequent by-election.

After unsuccessfully attempting to retain the seat of Cartier for the Liberals, Lazarus Phillips continued his legal profession until he was appointed to the Senate in 1968.

Without a seat, CCF candidate David Lewis continued in various executive roles within the party, and became a key builder of the New Democratic Party. After three more constituency election losses, Lewis finally became a member of Parliament for the riding of York South in the 1965 federal election. Following the resignation of Tommy Douglas, Lewis went on to serve as the 2nd leader of the New Democratic Party from 1971 to 1975.

== Result ==
Canadian federal by-election, August 9, 1943: Cartier Death of Peter Bercovitch
Party	Candidate	Votes	%	±%
Labor–Progressive	Fred Rose	5,789	30.42	–
Bloc populaire	Paul Masse	5,639	29.63	–
Liberal	Lazarus Phillips	4,180	21.97	–66.57
Co-operative Commonwealth	David Lewis	3,313	17.41	–
Independent	Moses Miller	109	0.57	–
Total valid votes		19,030	100.00	
Labor–Progressive gain from Liberal		Swing		–
Source: Library of Parliament

== Previous result ==
1940 Canadian federal election: Cartier
Party	Candidate	Votes	%	±%
Liberal	Peter Bercovitch	18,191	88.54	+23.27
National Labour	Arthur Ainey	2,354	11.46	–
Total valid votes		20,545	100.0	
Liberal hold		Swing		–
Source: Library of Parliament

== See also ==
- By-elections to the 19th Canadian Parliament
- Communism in Canada
- Canada in World War II
