= David Lewis (Canadian politician) =

Canadian lawyer and politician (1909-1981)

David Lewis CC QC
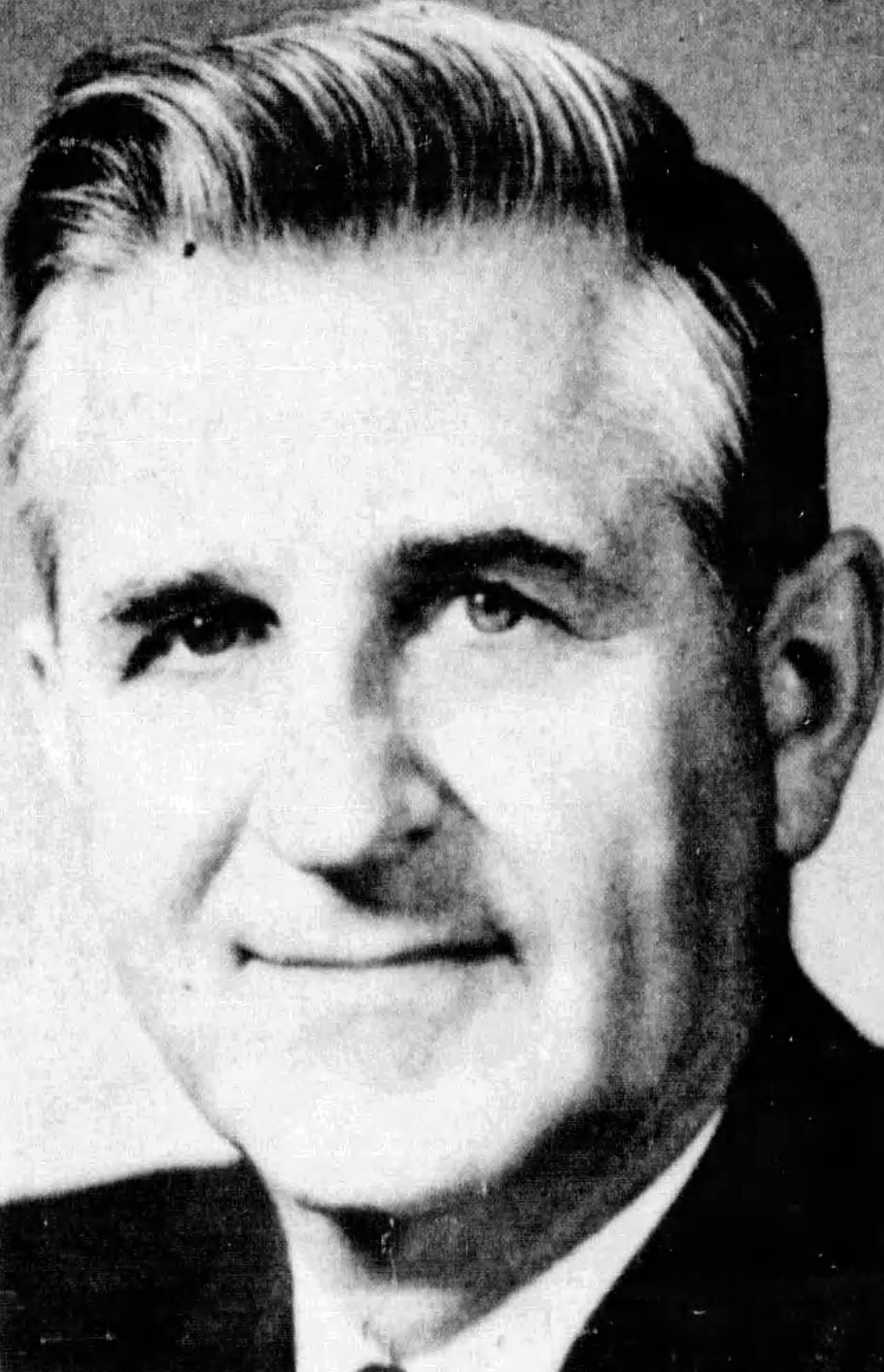
- Lewis c. 1968

Leader of the New Democratic Party
- In office April 24, 1971 – July 7, 1975
- Preceded by: Tommy Douglas
- Succeeded by: Ed Broadbent

Member of Parliament for York South
- In office November 8, 1965 – July 8, 1974
- Preceded by: Marvin Gelber
- Succeeded by: Ursula Appolloni
- In office June 18, 1962 – April 8, 1963
- Preceded by: William G. Beech
- Succeeded by: Marvin Gelber

National President of the Co-operative Commonwealth Federation
- In office 1958–1961
- Preceded by: M. J. Coldwell
- Succeeded by: Office abolished

National Chairman of the Co-operative Commonwealth Federation
- In office 1954–1958
- Preceded by: Percy Wright
- Succeeded by: Office abolished

National Secretary of the Co-operative Commonwealth Federation
- In office 1936–1950
- Preceded by: M. J. Coldwell
- Succeeded by: Lorne Ingle

Personal details
- Born: David Losz; June 23 or October 1909 Svisloch, Grodno Governorate, Russian Empire
- Died: May 23, 1981 (aged 71) Ottawa, Ontario, Canada
- Party: Co-operative Commonwealth Federation (before 1961); New Democratic Party (after 1961)
- Other political affiliations: Labour Party (UK) (1930s)
- Spouse: Sophie Carson
- Children: 4, including Stephen
- Parent(s): Morris Lewis; Rose Lazarovitch
- Relatives: Lewis family
- Education: McGill University; Lincoln College, Oxford
- Occupation: Lawyer

David Lewis CC QC (born David Losz; June 23 or October 1909 – May 23, 1981) was a Canadian labour lawyer and social democratic politician. He was national secretary of the Co-operative Commonwealth Federation (CCF) from 1936 to 1950 and one of the key architects of the New Democratic Party (NDP) in 1961. In 1962, he was elected as the Member of Parliament (MP), in the House of Commons of Canada, for York South. While an MP, he was elected the NDP's national leader and served from 1971 until 1975.

Lewis's politics were heavily influenced by the Jewish Labour Bund, which contributed to his support of parliamentary democracy. He was an avowed anti-communist, and while a Rhodes Scholar prevented communist domination of the Oxford University Labour Club. In Canada, he played a major role in removing communist influence from the labour movement.

In the CCF, he took the role of disciplinarian and dealt with internal organizational problems. He helped draft the Winnipeg Declaration, which moderated the CCF's economic policies to include acceptance of capitalism, albeit subject to stringent government regulation. As the United Steelworkers of America (USW)'s legal counsel in Canada, he helped them take over the International Union of Mine, Mill, and Smelter Workers (Mine-Mill). His involvement with the USW also led to a central role in the creation of the Canadian Labour Congress in 1956.

The Lewis family has been active in socialist politics since the turn of the twentieth century, starting with David Lewis's father's involvement in the Bund in Russia, continuing with David, and followed by his eldest son, Stephen Lewis, who led the Ontario NDP from 1970 until 1978. When David was elected the NDP's national leader in 1971, he and Stephen became one of the first father-and-son teams to head Canadian political parties simultaneously. After his defeat in the 1974 federal election, he stepped down as leader and retired from politics. He spent his last years as a university professor at Carleton University and as a travel correspondent for the Toronto Star. In retirement, he was named to the Order of Canada for his political service. After suffering from cancer for a long time, he died in Ottawa in 1981. In 2026, his grandson Avi Lewis was elected leader of the federal NDP.

== Early life ==
Lewis was born David Losz in the Russian Empire sometime after Svisloch's first snowfall in October 1909 to Moishe Losz and his wife Rose (née Lazarovitch). (Note: His birthday is unknown. When he emigrated from Russia to Canada in 1921, he did not speak English, and according to his daughter Janet Solberg, June 23 was the first date that popped into his head when the immigration officer asked him when he was born. Smith identifies October as the best guess, since the only given specifics were that he was born "right after the first snows in 1909".) His official birth date of June 23 was the one he gave the immigration officer when he arrived in Canada. Lewis's political activism began in the shtetl he lived in until 1921. Svisloch was located in the Pale of Settlement, the westernmost region of the Russian Empire, in what is now Belarus. After World War I, it became a Polish border town, occasionally occupied by the Soviet Union during the Polish-Soviet War of the early 1920s. Jewish people were in the majority, numbering 3,500 out of Svisloch's 4,500 residents. Unlike many of the other shtetls in the Pale, it had an industrial economy based on tanning. Its semi-urban industrial population was receptive to social democratic politics and the labour movement, as embodied by the Jewish Labour Bund.

Moishe Losz was Svisloch's Bund Chairman. The Bund was an outlawed socialist party that called for overthrowing the Tsar, equality for all, and national rights for the Jewish community; it functioned both as a political party and labour movement. Lewis spent his formative years immersed in its culture and philosophy. The Bund's membership, although mostly ethnically Jewish, was secular humanist in practice.

Moishe and David were influenced by the Bund's political pragmatism, embodied in its maxim that "It is better to go along with the masses in a not totally correct direction than to separate oneself from them and remain a purist." David would bring this philosophy to the Co-operative Commonwealth Federation (CCF) and New Democratic Party (NDP); in clashes between the parties' "ideological missionaries and the power pragmatists when internal debates raged about policy or action", he was in the latter camp.

When the Russian Civil War and the Polish-Soviet War were at their fiercest, in the summer of 1920, Poland invaded, and the Red Russian Bolshevik army counter-attacked. The Bolsheviks reached the Svisloch border in July 1920. Moishe Losz openly opposed the Bolsheviks and would later be jailed by them for his opposition. When the Polish army recaptured Svisloch on August 25, 1920, they executed five Jewish citizens as "spies". Unsafe under either regime and with his family's future prospects bleak, Moishe left for Canada in May 1921, to work in his brother-in-law's Montreal clothing factory. By August, he saved enough money to send for his family, including David and his siblings, Charlie and Doris. In Canada, Moishe anglicized his name to Morris Lewis

David Lewis was a secular Jew, as was Moishe. However, his maternal grandfather, Usher Lazarovitch, was religious and, in the brief period between May and August 1921 before David emigrated, gave his grandson the only real religious training he would ever receive. David did not actively take part in a religious service again until his granddaughter Ilana's Bat Mitzvah in the late 1970s. In practice, the Lewis family, including David, his wife Sophie, and their children Janet, Nina, Stephen, and Michael, were atheists.

== Early life in Canada ==
The family came to Canada by boat and landed in Halifax, Nova Scotia, in Autumn 1921. They then went by rail to Montreal to meet Moishe Lewis. David Lewis was a native Yiddish speaker and understood very little English at the time. He first improved his English by buying a copy of Charles Dickens' novel The Old Curiosity Shop and a Yiddish-English dictionary. A Welsh teacher at Fairmount Public School, where Lewis was a student, helped him learn English and passed on his Welsh accent.

Lewis entered Baron Byng High School in September 1924. He soon became friends with A.M. (Abe) Klein, who became one of Canada's leading poets. He also met Irving Layton, another future prominent Canadian writer, to whom he acted as a political mentor. Baron Byng High School was predominantly Jewish because it was in the heart of Montreal's non-affluent Jewish community, and was ghetto-like because Jews were forbidden from attending many high schools.

In high school, besides poets, Lewis met Sophie Carson, who eventually became his wife. Klein, their mutual friend, introduced them. Carson came from a religious Jewish family. Her father did not approve of Lewis because he was a recent immigrant to Canada; in Carson's father's opinion, Lewis had little to no possibility of success.

After high school, Lewis spent five years at McGill University in Montreal: four in arts and one in law. While there, he helped found the Montreal branch of the Young People's Socialist League. He gave lectures sponsored by this anti-communist socialist club, and was its nominal leader. One of his favourite professors was Canadian humorist and noted Conservative party proponent, Stephen Leacock, whom Lewis liked more for his personality than for his academic discipline of economics.

In his third year, Lewis founded The McGilliad campus magazine. It published many of his anti-communist views, though the December 1930 issue included an article he wrote expressing his approval of the Russian Revolution and calling for a greater understanding of the Soviet Union; throughout his career, he would attack communism, but would always have sympathy for the 1917 revolutionaries. Also at McGill, Lewis met and worked with prominent Canadian socialists like F. R. Scott, Eugene Forsey, J. King Gordon, and Frank Underhill. He would work with all of them again in the 1940s and 50s in the CCF.

== Rhodes Scholarship and Oxford ==
With Scott's encouragement, Lewis applied for a Rhodes Scholarship during his first year at law school. The interviews for the Quebec representative were conducted in Montreal. The examining board included the then-president of the Canadian Pacific Railway (CPR), Sir Edward Beatty. In response to a question about what he would do if he became prime minister, Lewis stated that he would nationalize the CPR. Despite this answer and his socialist views in general, his responses to the board's cross-examination satisfied them that he was not a communist, and they awarded him the scholarship.

=== Political involvement ===
When David Lewis entered Lincoln College, Oxford, in 1932, he immediately took a leadership role in the university's socialist-labour circles. Michael Foot, the future leader of the British Labour Party, mentioned in an interview that Lewis was,

the most powerful socialist debater in the place. I don't think with any rival ... He had a very powerful influence indeed amongst students, partly because he had so much more experience than the rest of us but partly because he had brilliant debating powers. I mean one of the best I've ever heard. If you talk of tough political debates, well, he was absolutely unbeatable ... I knew him [at Oxford] when I was a Liberal [and] he played a part in converting me to socialism.

When Lewis came to Oxford, the Labour Club was a tame organization adhering to Christian activism, or genteel socialist theories like those expressed by R.H. Tawney in his book The Acquisitive Society. Lewis's modified Bundist interpretation of Marxism, which Smith labels "Parliamentary Marxism", ignited renewed interest in the club after the disappointment of Ramsay MacDonald's Labour government.

The Oxford newspaper Isis noted Lewis's leadership ability at this early stage in his career. In its February 7, 1934, issue, while Lewis was president, they wrote of the club: "The energy of these University Socialists is almost unbelievable. If the Socialist movement as a whole is anything like as active as they are, then a socialist victory at the next election is inevitable."

In February 1934, British fascist William Joyce (Lord Haw Haw) visited Oxford. Lewis and future Ontario CCF leader Ted Jolliffe organized a noisy protest by planting Labour Club members in the dance hall where Joyce was speaking and having groups of two and three of them leave at a time, making much noise on the creaking wooden floors. They were successful in drowning out Joyce, and he did not complete his speech. Afterward, a street fight erupted between Joyce's Blackshirt supporters and members of the Labour Club, including Lewis.

Lewis prevented the communists from making inroads at Oxford. Ted Jolliffe stated

there was a difference between his speeches at the Union and his speeches at the Labour Club. His speeches at the Union had more humour in them; the atmosphere was entirely different. But his speeches at the Labour Club were deadly serious ... His influence at the Labour Club, more than anyone else's, I think, explains the failure of the Communists to make headway there. There were so many naive people around who could have been taken in.

He increased the Labour Club's membership by three-quarters by the time he left.

In accordance with Bundism, Lewis rejected violent revolution and the dictatorship of the proletariat. The Bund insisted that the revolution should be through democratic means, as Marx had judged possible in the late 1860s, and that democracy should prevail afterward. Influenced by Fabianism, Lewis became an incrementalist in his approach to replacing non-socialist governments. As Lewis biographer Cameron Smith points out:

So what he ended up with was a modified Bundist interpretation of Marxism. Call it, if you will, Parliamentary Marxism. It was a Marxian analysis of economics and a parliamentary approach to politics. And if David were forced to choose, he would have chosen Parliamentary over Marxism.

Lewis was a prominent figure in the British Labour Party, which, in emphasizing parliamentary action and organizational prowess, took an approach similar to the Bund's. Upon his 1935 graduation, the party offered him a candidacy in a safe seat in the British House of Commons. This left Lewis with a difficult decision: whether to stay in England or go home to Canada. If he had stayed in England, he likely would have been a partner in a prominent London law firm associated with Stafford Cripps and become a cabinet minister the next time Labour formed a government. Cripps, then a prominent barrister and Labour Party official, was grooming Lewis to be Prime Minister. Lewis's other choice was to return to Montreal and help build the fledgling Co-operative Commonwealth Federation (CCF), with no guarantee of success. The CCF had been founded in western Canada in 1932. A personal note from J. S. Woodsworth, dated June 19, 1935, asked Lewis to take this latter option; in the end, he did.

=== Oxford Union ===
Besides his political involvement, Lewis was active with the Oxford Union, probably the most prestigious and important university debating club in the English-speaking world. His first debate, in January 1933, was on the resolution "That the British Empire is a menace to International good will"; Lewis was one of the participants for the "Aye" side. They lost.

The February 9, 1933, debate brought Lewis some level of early prominence. The resolution was "That this House will under no circumstances fight for its King or Country" and was so controversial that it was news around the British Empire and beyond. Lewis again spoke for the "Aye" side. They won overwhelmingly and caused a newspaper uproar throughout the Empire. The Times of London entered the fray by pooh-poohing those who took the Union and their motion seriously.

Lewis became a member of the Union's Library Committee on March 9, 1933, and its treasurer in March 1934. After two failed attempts, he was narrowly elected president in late November 1934. He was president during the Hilary term, from the beginning of January until the end of April 1935. The Isis commented that "... David Lewis ... will be, beyond question, the least Oxonian person ever to the lead the Society. In appearance, background, and intellectual outlook he is a grim antithesis to all the suave, slightly delicate young men who for generations have sat on the Union rostrum ..."

== CCF National Secretary ==
=== Return to Canada ===
Sophie Carson had accompanied Lewis to Oxford, and they wed on August 15, 1935, shortly after their return. The wedding took place in his parents' home; though a rabbi officiated, most traditional Jewish practices were not observed.

In 1935, David Lewis became the National Secretary of the CCF. As Smith puts it:

Into this political whirlwind stepped David. A centralist in a nation that was decentralizing. A socialist in a country that voted solidly capitalist. A campaigner for a party with no money, facing two parties each of which was big, powerful, and affluent. A professional, in a party of amateurs who mostly thought of themselves as a movement, not a party. An anti-Communist at a time when Canadian Communists were about to enter their heyday. A publicist seeking a unified voice for a party riven with dissent. An organizer whose leader, J.S. Woodsworth, really didn't believe in the organization, thinking that the CCF should remain a loosely knit, co-operative association and believed this so implicitly that when it came time to appoint Lewis full-time to the job of the national secretary [in 1938], he resisted, fearing the CCF would lose its spontaneity.

That Lewis not only survived but prevailed is a testament to his skill and perseverance.

Most of the founders of the CCF – including Woodsworth, Tommy Douglas, M. J. Coldwell, and Stanley Knowles, – were informed by the Social Gospel, to which Lewis, with his Marxist socialism balanced by the Bund's democratic principles, felt an affinity. Both the Bund and the Social Gospel were focused on the material present rather than the afterlife. Both called on people to change their environment for the better rather than hoping that God might do it for them. Social justice, the brotherhood of man, and moral self-improvement were common to both.

It became obvious after the October 1937 Ontario election that the CCF needed an image change; it was seen by the electorate as too far left. F. R. Scott pointed this out to Lewis in a letter, recommended moderating some of the party's policies, and advised that "in the political arena we must find our friends among the near right."

In August 1938, Lewis quit his job at the Ottawa law firm of Smart & Biggar to work full-time as the CCF National Secretary. His starting salary was $1,200 per year, a low sum of money, even at that time, for a job with so much responsibility.

=== Trying to create an organization ===
As National Secretary, Lewis emphasized organization over ideology and forging links to unions. He worked to moderate the party's image and downplay the Regina Manifesto's more radical language, which seemed to scare off moderate voters. The offending language included "No CCF government will rest content until it has eradicated capitalism and put into operation the full programme of socialized planning". Lewis, federal leader M.J. Coldwell, and Clarie Gillis would spend the next 19 years trying to modify this declaration, finally succeeding with the 1956 Winnipeg Declaration.

At the 1944 CCF convention, Lewis won a concession "that even large business could have a place in the party – if they behave." Rather than opposing all private enterprise, Lewis was concerned with preventing monopoly capitalism. He passed a resolution reading "The socialization of large-scale enterprise, however, does not mean taking over every private business. Where private business shows no signs of becoming a monopoly, operates efficiently under decent working conditions, and does not operate to the detriment of the Canadian people, it will be given every opportunity to function, to provide a fair rate of return, and to make its contribution to the nation's wealth." This resolution allowed for a mixed-economy that left most jobs in the private sphere.

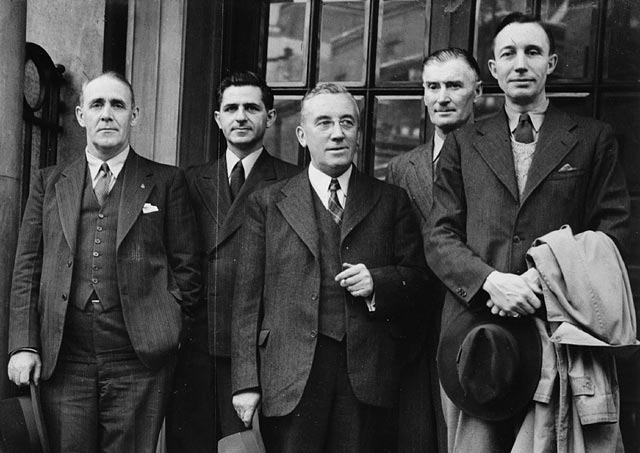
Federal Co-operative Commonwealth Federation (CCF) delegation attending the September 1944 Conference of Commonwealth Labour Parties in London, England. Pictured from left to right: Clarie Gillis, MP for Cape Breton South; David Lewis, National Secretary; M.J. Coldwell, National Leader, MP for Rosetown—Biggar, Percy E. Wright, MP for Melfort; and Frank Scott, National Chairman.

Lewis did not share the desire of some members to keep the CCF "ideologically pure" and adhered to the Bundist belief that "it was better to go along with the masses in a not totally correct direction than to separate oneself from them and remain 'purist'." However, the CCF was as much a movement as it was a political party, and its own members frequently undermined it with radical proclamations. Lewis criticized the British Columbia CCF for such comments, saying

what we say and do must be measured by the effect which it will have on our purpose of mobilizing people for action. If what we say and do will blunt or harm our purpose ... then we are saying and doing a false thing even if, in the abstract, it is true ... When, in heaven's name are we going to learn that working-class politics and the struggle for power are not a Sunday-school class where the purity of godliness and the infallibility of the Bible must be held up without fear of consequences.

David Lewis was the party's "heavy", which did not help his popularity among CCF members, but after witnessing what he considered to be the European left's self-destruction in the 1930s, he was quick to end self-immolating tactics or policies. He would tolerate some criticism of the party by its members, but when he believed that it rose to self-mutilation, he suppressed it ruthlessly. This was most apparent when Lewis attacked and discredited Frank Underhill and his handling of Woodsworth House. (Note: Woodsworth House was both a building and political think-tank, the home of the Ontario CCF (the party that was involved in the Province of Ontario's politics). It was created by a financial foundation that was independent of the Ontario CCF. It took its name from the first CCF leader. The house was inaugurated in January 1947, at 565 Jarvis Street in Toronto. It ran into financial difficulties in the late 1940s, due to the educational programme that Underhill was responsible for. He allowed the expenses for publishing papers and other materials to exceed the budget, and his only solution was to sell Woodsworth House to pay off the debt. Also of note, Frank Underhill was one of the founders of the League of Social Reconstruction, and one of the people who drafted the CCF's Regina Manifesto in 1933. He was a prominent University of Toronto professor and, until the Woodsworth House event, held in as high esteem as Lewis by party members.) Early in Lewis's career, Underhill was one of his mentors; this did not matter when Woodsworth House was stricken with financial difficulties in the late 1940s. Lewis was quick to blame and then discharged Underhill and the rest of the Woodsworth executive of their responsibilities. It was an unfortunate event that cost the CCF in the academic and intelligentsia world. To sum up Lewis's reign, discipline, and solidarity were paramount. There had to be limited to discussion and tolerance of dissenting views.

=== Make This Your Canada ===
In 1943, Lewis co-wrote Make This Your Canada with F. R. Scott, then the CCF's National Chairman. The book's main argument was that national economic planning had proven itself during wartime with the King government's imposition of wage and price controls through the Wartime Prices and Trade Board. Lewis and Scott further argued that its wartime success could translate to peacetime, and that Canada should adopt a mixed economy. They also called for public ownership of key economic sectors, and for the burden to be placed on private companies to demonstrate that they could manage an industry more effectively in the private sector than the government could in the public sector. The book also outlined the history of the CCF up to that time and explained the party's decision-making process. By Canadian standards, the book was popular, and sold over 25,000 copies in its first year of publication. (Note: Make This Your Canada was reprinted in 2001, by the Hybrid Publishers Co-operative Ltd. – in time for the pivotal federal New Democratic Party convention in Winnipeg.)

=== 1943 Cartier by-election ===
Lewis first ran for the CCF in the 1940 federal election in York West. He placed a distant third, receiving 8,330 fewer votes than the second-place Liberal candidate, Chris J. Bennett. Despite his poor showing in his first election, the party asked Lewis to run in the 1943 by-election in the Montreal, Quebec, federal riding of Cartier, which had been made vacant by the death of Peter Bercovitch. Lewis's opponents included Fred Rose of the communist Labor–Progressive Party. It was a vicious campaign, immortalized by A. M. Klein in an uncompleted novel called Come the Revolution. The novel was broadcast in the 1980s on Lister Sinclair's (Note: Sinclair co-wrote Ontario CCF leader Ted Jolliffe's "Gestapo" speech during the 1945 Ontario general election, that led to the appointment of the LeBel Royal Commission.) Ideas programme on CBC Radio One. If the Communist rhetoric could be believed, "Lewis was a Fascist done up in brown."

Rose won and became the only (as of 2013) Communist to sit in the House of Commons. Lewis placed fourth. The sizable Jewish vote mostly went to Rose. The leftist "common front" punished Lewis by supporting Rose, who was seen to be of the community; Lewis lived in Ottawa at the time. It took Lewis many years to recover from this campaign, and its reverberation coloured Lewis's decision on where to run.

Canadian federal by-election, August 9, 1943: Cartier Death of Peter Bercovitch
Party	Candidate	Votes	%	±%
Labor–Progressive	Fred Rose	5,789	30.42	–
Bloc populaire	Paul Masse	5,639	29.63	–
Liberal	Lazarus Phillips	4,180	21.97	–66.57
Co-operative Commonwealth	David Lewis	3,313	17.41	–
Independent	Moses Miller	109	0.57	–
Total valid votes		19,030	100.00	
Labor–Progressive gain from Liberal		Swing		–
Source: Library of Parliament

=== 1945 elections: disappointment and defeat ===
The Canadian federal and the Ontario elections of 1945 were possibly the most crucial to Canada in the 20th century. They took place at the beginning of the welfare state, and the elections would set the course of political thought to the end of the century and beyond. The year was a disaster for the CCF, both nationally and in Ontario. It never fully recovered; in 1961, it would evolve into the New Democratic Party. As NDP strategist and historian Gerald Caplan put it: "June 4, and June 11, 1945, proved to be black days in CCF annals: socialism was effectively removed from the Canadian political agenda."

The anti-socialist crusade by the Ontario Conservative Party, mostly credited to the Ontario Provincial Police (OPP) special investigative branch's agent D-208 (Captain William J. Osborne-Dempster) and the Conservative propagandists Gladstone Murray and Montague A. Sanderson, diminished the CCF's initially favourable position: the September 1943 Gallup poll showed the CCF leading nationally with 29 percent support, with the Liberals and Conservatives tied for second place at 28 percent. By April 1945, the CCF was down to 20 percent nationally, and on election day it received only 16 percent.

Another factor in the CCF's defeat was the unofficial coalition between the Liberal Party of Canada and the communist Labor-Progressive Party. It guaranteed a split in the left-of-centre vote.

Lewis ran in Hamilton West instead of the CCF-friendly Winnipeg North riding that had elected CCF and Labour Party candidates since the 1920s and had a substantial Jewish population. Historians and activists disagree on Lewis's reasons for doing so, with Caplan suggesting that the shock of the Cartier election probably made him reluctant to fight another intense campaign against a Jewish Communist candidate. Whatever his reasons, he was soundly defeated. In the 1949 federal election, Lewis ran again in the Hamilton area, in the riding of Wentworth. He lost again, placing a relatively distant third.

=== Fighting Communist influence ===
The 1945 defeats were partially the result of an alliance between the Liberals and the communist Labor–Progressive Party (LPP). The LPP focused in on CCF-held seats, deliberately splitting the vote, and declared a "Liberal–Labour" coalition on May 29, 1944. They declared open warfare on the CCF in 1944, with spokesman John Weir stating in the LPP's Canadian Tribune newspaper that "a resounding defeat of the CCF at the polls must be [their] the main objective."

The Canadian Congress of Labour (CCL) supported the CCF, but the Trades and Labour Congress (TLC) refused to provide official endorsement. This lack of unity between the two main Canadian umbrella labour organizations hurt the CCF, and was part of the Liberal–Communist alliance: TLC president Percey Berough was a Liberal, and vice-president Pat Sullivan was a Communist.

In the Ontario provincial election, the communists urged trade union members to vote for the right-wing Conservative George Drew rather than the CCF.

Lewis and Charles Millard, of the Canadian Congress of Labour, decided to purge organized labour's decision-making bodies of communists. Their first target was the Sudbury, Ontario, CCF riding association and its affiliated International Union of Mine, Mill, and Smelter Workers (Mine-Mill) Local 598. However, Local 598 was not under Communist control: out of 11,000 dues-paying members, fewer than 100 were communists. Over the next twenty years, a fierce and ultimately successful battle was waged by Millard's United Steel Workers of America (USW) to take over Local 598.

The attacks on the Sudbury CCF were even more costly, at least in terms of voter support. Sudbury's Bob Carlin was one of the few CCF Members of Provincial Parliament (MPPs) to survive the Drew government's 1945 landslide victory. Carlin had been part of Ted Jolliffe's team that had orchestrated the CCF's 1943 breakthrough, but was first and foremost a union man. He was a long-time labour organizer, going back to 1916 and the predecessor to the Mine-Mill: the Western Federation of Miners. Carlin was loyal to his union, in whose service he had spent ten years, and to the men and woman who helped build it, regardless of their political affiliation; this made him unpopular with the CCF establishment in both Toronto and Ottawa.

Millard, Jolliffe, and Lewis did not directly accuse Carlin of being a communist. Instead, they attacked him for not dealing with communists in Local 598, which was built by both communists and CCFers (with the latter firmly in control of the executive). Lewis and Jolliffe made the case to expel him from the Ontario CCF caucus at a Toronto special meeting of the CCF executive and the legislative caucus on April 13, 1948. In essence, Carlin became a casualty of Steel's plans to raid Mine-Mill. The CCF lost the seat in the 1948 Ontario election, placing fourth. The Conservatives won the seat, and Carlin, as an independent, finished a close second. It was not until the CCF became the New Democratic Party (NDP) and the Mine-Mill versus USW war was over, in 1967, that another social democrat – Elie Martel in Sudbury East – was elected to the Legislative Assembly of Ontario from the city.

Lewis and Millard's crusade to limit communist influence received an unexpected boost from the Soviet Union, in Nikita Khrushchev's 1956 denunciation of Stalinism. In his "Secret Speech", On the Personality Cult and its Consequences, delivered to a closed session of the 20th Party Congress of the Communist Party of the Soviet Union, Khrushchev denounced Stalin for his cult of personality and his regime for "violation of Leninist norms of legality". When the excesses of Stalin's regime were exposed, it caused a split in the communist movement in Canada and permanently weakened it. By the end of 1956, the LPP's influence in the trade union movement and politics was spent.

== Private labour law practice ==
Lewis resigned as national secretary in 1950 and moved to Toronto to practise law in partnership with Ted Jolliffe. He became the chief legal advisor to the USW's Canadian division, and assisted them in their organizing efforts and battles with the Mine-Mill union. Lewis focused on his law practice for the next five years. In his first year, he paid more in income tax than he had earned annually as CCF National Secretary.

He bought his first house, in the Bathurst Street – St. Clair Avenue West area of Toronto, during this period. After his father Moishe died in 1951, his mother Rose moved from Montreal into the Lewis home at 95 Burnside Drive. This is the home where his son Stephen would spend his teenage years, and the other three children would grow up.

=== Winnipeg Declaration and the New Party ===
Although he gave up day-to-day running of the party's organization, he stayed on the national executive as the English-speaking vice-president from 1950 to 1954. After four years of comparatively limited involvement with CCF internal politics, Lewis became the party's national chairman, by winning the election to replace Percy Wright. He, along with Lorne Ingle, the person that replaced him as national secretary in 1950, became the main drafters of the 1956 Winnipeg Declaration, which replaced the Regina Manifesto. The lead-up to the August 1956 CCF convention had Lewis working full-time in his labour practice, including work on the merger of the Canadian Congress of Labour and the Trades and Labour Congress to form the Canadian Labour Congress (CLC), and putting in long hours organizing the committee that wrote the Declaration. He collapsed in his office in May 1956; after administering several tests for a possible cardiac condition, the doctors concluded that Lewis collapsed of exhaustion. He stayed in bed for a week and recovered enough to help the Declaration pass ten weeks later. The Winnipeg convention was the CCF's swan song. Even with the Declaration's modified tone, which removed state planning and nationalization of industry as central tenets of the party's platform, the CCF suffered a crippling defeat in the 1958 federal election, which became known as the "Diefenbaker sweep". It was obvious to Lewis, Coldwell and the rest of the CCF executive that the CCF could not continue as it was, and, with the co-operation of the CLC, they started exploring how to broaden its appeal.

=== CCF President ===
In 1958, Lewis worked closely with the CLC's president Claude Jodoin and the CLC's executive vice-president Stanley Knowles (Note: Knowles lost his Winnipeg seat in the "Diefenbaker Sweep", but was very quickly ushered into the CLC's executive.) to merge the labour and social-democratic movements into a new party. Coldwell did not want to continue as the party's national leader, because he lost his parliamentary seat in the election. Lewis persuaded him to stay on until the new party was formed. Lewis was elected party president at the July 1958 convention in Montreal, which also endorsed a motion for the executive and National Council to "enter into discussions with Canadian Labour Congress" and other like-minded groups to lay the groundwork for a new party.

=== Leadership succession crisis ===
By 1960, progress was being made in creating a new party, but Lewis had to, again, act as the disciplinarian. Since Coldwell lost his seat, he was constantly considering resignation but was repeatedly dissuaded by the party. With Coldwell lacking a seat, the CCF caucus chose Hazen Argue as its leader in the House of Commons. During the lead-up to the 1960 CCF convention, Argue was pressing Coldwell to step down. This leadership challenge jeopardized plans for an orderly transition to the new party. Lewis and the rest of the new party's organizers opposed Argue's manoeuvres and wanted Saskatchewan premier Tommy Douglas to be the new party's first leader. To prevent their plans from derailing, David Lewis attempted to persuade Argue not to force a vote at the convention on the question of the party's leadership. He was unsuccessful. There was a split between the parliamentary caucus and the party executive on the convention floor. Coldwell quit, and Argue replaced him as a leader.

In July 1961, the CCF became the New Democratic Party (NDP). They elected Tommy Douglas as their leader by a convincing 1391 to 380 margin over Argue. Six months later, Argue quit the party and crossed the floor to join the Liberals.

In the mid-1970s, David Lewis reflected on this incident and he concluded that he had not handled the leadership transition well:

I, as president of the CCF, was very much in the wrong in trying to get a unanimous vote for Tommy. It arose out of a tradition we had had – no one opposed Woodsworth, no one had opposed Coldwell. They were chosen. I met with Hazen and tried to dissuade him from being a candidate. It was wrong. This attitude produced bitterness around the Hazen-Douglas contest.

== 1962–1971: Member of Parliament for York South ==
Lewis celebrating his election win in 1962

Two days after the end of the NDP's 1961 founding convention, Tommy Douglas wrote a letter to Sophie Lewis, David's wife, telling her that David must run in the next election. Lewis decided to run in his home riding of York South, which was concurrently held provincially, in the Legislative Assembly of Ontario, by the NDP's Ontario leader, Donald C. MacDonald.

Diefenbaker's government had to call an election sometime in 1962, so there was time to plan Lewis's campaign. He had two campaign managers: his son Stephen, and Gerry Caplan. One of their main strategies was to gain votes in the riding's affluent Jewish enclave in the Village of Forest Hill. Lewis, however, was perceived by the Jewish community as an outsider because he did not take part in community events or belong to a synagogue. His initial opposition to the creation of the state of Israel, a result of his Bundist politics, also did not sit well with the mostly Zionist community. It took extra effort on Stephen's and Caplan's parts to convince community members that David was a legitimate Jewish voice and that he would not harm their businesses. He came to support the state of Israel after the United Nations voted to partition Palestine in May 1948. Besides resistance from the Jewish community, in his role as party national vice-president, David Lewis had to tackle the impending doctors' strike in Saskatchewan, the result of the CCF government's implementation of Medicare. He called the province's doctors "blackmailers" for suggesting such a strike. Lewis also appeared on one of the NDP's few national television spots. He appeared on the national CTV Television Network with Walter Pitman to present the NDP's platform on a planned economy, in a conversation-style election broadcast. On June 18, 1962, Lewis was elected in York South, and finally became an MP. Since Tommy Douglas lost in his seat, Lewis was considered the front-runner to become house leader until Douglas entered the house in an October by-election.

1962 Canadian federal election
Party	Candidate	Votes	%
New Democratic Party	David Lewis	19,101	40.42
Liberal	Marvin Gelber	15,423	32.64
Progressive Conservative	William G. Beech	12,552	26.56
Social Credit	Reinald Nochakoff	179	0.38

Lewis's first term as MP was a short one, as Diefenbaker's minority government was defeated in the April 8, 1963 general election. (Note: In Canadian politics, if a minority government – one that does not have a majority of the elected members in the House of Commons – loses a vote of non-confidence, then the government has to call a general election or resign. This is exactly the scenario that happened in 1963, and why Lewis had to fight another election so soon after being elected.) Lewis lost in Forest Hill, as his support among its Jewish community evaporated and returned to the Liberals, who were seen as best able to contain the Social Credit Party, which was perceived to be anti-Semitic. This was only a temporary set-back. With Diefenbaker in opposition (and unlikely to resurrect the coalition in Quebec that gave him his majority in 1958) and Social Credit a diminished force, Lewis returned to the House of Commons in the 1965 general election. He was re-elected in the 1968 election and became the NDP leader in the House of Commons after Douglas lost his seat. At the 1969 Winnipeg National Convention, Douglas announced that he intended to step down as leader by 1971, which meant that Lewis became the de facto leader in the interim.

The October 1970 Quebec FLQ Crisis put Lewis in the spotlight, as he was the only NDP MP with any roots in Quebec. He and Douglas were opposed to the October 16 implementation of the War Measures Act. The Act, enacted previously only for wartime purposes, imposed extreme limitations on civil liberties, and gave the police and military vastly expanded powers for arresting and detaining suspects, usually with little to no evidence required. Although it was meant to be only used in Québec, its being Federal legislation meant that it was enforced throughout Canada. Some police services, from outside of Quebec, took advantage of it for their own purposes, which mostly had nothing even remotely related to the Quebec situation, as Lewis and Douglas suspected. Sixteen of the 20 members of the NDP parliamentary caucus voted against the implementation of the War Measures Act in the House of Commons. They took much grief for being the only parliamentarians to vote against it. Lewis stated at a press scrum that day: "The information we do have, showed a situation of criminal acts and criminal conspiracy in Quebec. But, there is no information that there was unintended, or apprehended, or planned insurrection, which alone, would justify invoking the War Measures Act." About five years later, many of the MPs who voted to implement it regretted doing so, and belatedly honoured Douglas and Lewis for their stand against it. Progressive Conservative leader Robert Stanfield went so far as to say that, "Quite frankly, I've admired Tommy Douglas and David Lewis, and those fellows in the NDP for having the courage to vote against that, although they took a lot of abuse at the time....I don't brood about it. I'm not proud of it."

== Leader of the NDP ==
Stephen Lewis was coming into his own during this period. In 1963, at the age of 26, he was elected to the Legislative Assembly of Ontario. Following the engineered 1970 resignation of Donald C. MacDonald, Stephen was elected leader of the Ontario New Democratic Party. During the early-to-mid-1970s, the father-and-son-team led the two largest sections of the NDP.

In February 1968, Stephen Lewis, as a supposed representative of the Ontario NDP legislative caucus, asked the 63-year-old Tommy Douglas to step down as leader so that a younger person could take over. Donald C. MacDonald stated that Lewis was not representing the caucus, but acting on his own. Though Douglas was taken aback by the suggestion, his defeat in the ensuing election bolstered Stephen's case, and on October 28, 1969, Douglas announced that he would step down as leader before the NDP's 1971 convention.

David Lewis ran to succeed Douglas as national leader. The 1971 leadership convention was a tumultuous affair. A new generation of NDP activists known as The Waffle proposed many controversial resolutions, including nationalization of all natural resource industries and support for Quebec Sovereignty. It took the combined efforts of the NDP establishment and the sizable trade union delegation—to vote down these resolutions, which caused many bitter debates and sharply divided the convention. Lewis, as the leading establishment figure, won the party's leadership on April 24 in a surprisingly close race that required four ballots before he could claim victory over the Waffle's James Laxer. Laxer had been prominently featured in media coverage leading up to and during the convention. Lewis's perceived heavy-handedness in dealing with The Waffle at this and previous conventions made him many enemies, as had his involvement in most of the CCF and NDP's internal conflicts during the previous 36 years. Many members who had felt his wrath as party disciplinarian plotted their revenge against him. At his first press conference after winning the leadership, Lewis stated that he was not beholden to the Waffle, as they were soundly defeated at the convention, and that he made no promises to them. He also warned the party's Quebec wing that they could continue to theorize about possible self-determination resolutions, but that, come election time, they must pledge themselves to the party's newly confirmed federalist policy. He did not purge the Waffle from the NDP, but left it to his son Stephen to do so in June 1972, when the party's Ontario wing resolved to disband the Waffle, or kick its members out of the party if they did not comply with the disbanding order.

David Lewis led the NDP through the 1972 federal election, during which he uttered his best-known quotation, calling Canadian corporations "corporate welfare bums", a term also used in the title of his 1972 book Louder Voices: The Corporate Welfare Bums. This election campaign also employed the first dedicated plane for the NDP leader's tour, dubbed "Bum Air" by reporters, because it was a slow, twin-engine, turbo-prop driven Handley Page Dart Herald. In previous campaigns, the party's leader, Tommy Douglas, had to use commercial Air Canada flights to get around during the election, with few people in his entourage.

The 1972 election returned a Liberal minority government and elected the greatest number of NDP MPs until the 1980 election, and left the NDP holding the balance of power until 1974. The NDP propped up Pierre Trudeau's Liberal government in exchange for the implementation of NDP proposals, such as the creation of Petro-Canada as a crown corporation. Lewis wanted to topple the government in a vote of no-confidence as early as possible because he saw no strategic advantage to support the Trudeau government: he believed that Trudeau would get the credit if a program was well-received and that the NDP would be vilified if it was unpopular.

In the 1974 election, the NDP were reduced to 16 seats. Lewis lost his seat, leading him to resign as party leader in 1975. It was revealed immediately after the election that he had been battling leukaemia for about two years; he had reportedly kept everyone, including his family, unaware of his condition.

== Final years ==
Lewis became a professor at the Institute of Canadian Studies at Carleton University in Ottawa during this time. In 1978, as a travel correspondent for The Toronto Star, Lewis visited Svisloch one last time, and noted that, "not one Jew now lives there." The Holocaust wiped out the town's Jewish community, and with it his extended family.

He completed the first volume (of a planned two) of his memoirs, The Good Fight: Political Memoirs 1909–1958 in 1981. He died of leukaemia shortly thereafter, on May 23, 1981, in Ottawa. He is the father of Stephen Lewis, a former Ontario NDP leader and was the United Nations Special Envoy for HIV/AIDS in Africa post-political career. His other son, Michael Lewis, was the longtime political district of the United Steel Workers in Canada, was provincial secretary of the Ontario NDP and a leading organizer in the federal NDP. He is also the father of Janet Solberg, president of the Ontario NDP in the 1980s. His other twin daughter is Nina Libeskind, the wife and business partner of architect Daniel Libeskind. Stephen's son, current NDP leader Avram (Avi) Lewis, is his grandson. In 2010, his granddaughter-in-law Naomi Klein, gave the inaugural David Lewis Lecture, sponsored by the Canadian Centre for Policy Alternatives.

== Awards and honours ==
In December 1976, Lewis was named as a Companion of the Order of Canada, and was invested into it on April 20, 1977. He was appointed to the highest level of the Order of Canada in "recognition of the contributions he has made to Labour and social reform and the deep concern he has had over the years for his adopted country." David Lewis Public School in Scarborough, Ontario is named in his honour.

== Electoral record ==
1940 Canadian federal election: York West
Party	Candidate	Votes	%	±%
Conservative	Agar Rodney Adamson	12,788	44.6	+12.9
Liberal	Chris. J. Bennett	12,117	42.2	+10.3
Co-operative Commonwealth	David Lewis	3,787	13.2	-6.4
Total valid votes		28,692	100.0	

Note: "National Government" vote is compared to Conservative vote in 1935 election.

Canadian federal by-election, August 9, 1943: Cartier Death of Peter Bercovitch
Party	Candidate	Votes	%	±%
Labor–Progressive	Fred Rose	5,789	30.42	
Bloc populaire	Paul Masse	5,639	29.63	
Liberal	Lazarus Phillips	4,180	21.97	–66.57
Co-operative Commonwealth	David Lewis	3,313	17.41	
Independent	Moses Miller	109	0.57	
Total valid votes		19,030	100.0	
Labor–Progressive gain from Liberal		Swing		+0.40

1945 Canadian federal election: Hamilton West
Party	Candidate	Votes
Liberal	GIBSON, Hon. Colin William G	11,439
Progressive Conservative	NEW, Chester William	9,260
Co-operative Commonwealth	LEWIS, David	6,728
Labor–Progressive	SNIDERMAN, Sam	1,063

1949 Canadian federal election: Wentworth
Party	Candidate	Votes	%	±%
Progressive Conservative	LENNARD, Frank Exton Jr.	16,443		
Liberal	HICKS, Henry Arnott	13,312		
Co-operative Commonwealth	LEWIS, David	11,638		
Labor–Progressive	RYERSON, Stanley B.	1,028		
Independent	GILES, Charles	562		

=== York South ===
1962 Canadian federal election
Party	Candidate	Votes
New Democratic Party	David LEWIS	19,101
Liberal	Marvin GELBER	15,423
Progressive Conservative	William G. BEECH	12,552
Social Credit	Reinald NOCHAKOFF	179

1963 Canadian federal election
Party	Candidate	Votes
Liberal	Marvin GELBER	21,042
New Democratic Party	David LEWIS	17,396
Progressive Conservative	William G. BEECH	9,648

1965 Canadian federal election
Party	Candidate	Votes
New Democratic Party	David LEWIS	21,693
Liberal	Marvin GELBER	18,098
Progressive Conservative	Maxwell ROTSTEIN	6,427

1968 Canadian federal election
Party	Candidate	Votes
New Democratic Party	David LEWIS	12,357
Liberal	Ron BARBARO	11,693
Progressive Conservative	Cy TOWNSEND	4,499

1972 Canadian federal election
Party	Candidate	Votes
New Democratic Party	David LEWIS	14,225
Liberal	Lucio APPOLLONI	9,551
Progressive Conservative	John M. OOSTROM	6,401
Unknown	Keith CORKHILL	172

1974 Canadian federal election: York South
Party	Candidate	Votes	%
Liberal	Ursula Appolloni	12,485	43.10
New Democratic	David Lewis	10,622	36.67
Progressive Conservative	Paul J. Schrieder	5,557	19.18
Independent	Richard Sanders	103	0.04
Marxist–Leninist	Keith Corkhill	102	0.04
Independent	Robert Douglas Sproule	97	0.03

=== 1971 leadership convention results ===
Held in Ottawa, Ontario on April 24, 1971.

Delegate Support by Ballot
Candidate	1st ballot		2nd ballot		3rd ballot		4th ballot	
Candidate	Votes cast	%	Votes cast	%	Votes cast	%	Votes cast	%
LEWIS, David	661	38.9%	715	42.5%	742	44.1%	1,046	63.1%
LAXER, James	378	22.3%	407	24.1%	508	30.2%	612	36.9%
HARNEY, John Paul	299	17.6%	347	20.5%	431	25.6%	Eliminated	
BROADBENT, John Edward (Ed)	236	13.9%	223	13.1%	Eliminated			
HOWARD, Frank	124	7.3%	Eliminated					
Total	1,698	100.0%	1,692	100.0%	1,681	100.0%	1,658	100.0%

== Archives ==
There is a David Lewis fonds at Library and Archives Canada. Archival reference number is R6773.
