= Results of the 1949 Canadian federal election =

1949 Canadian federal election

== Results by Province and Territory ==
=== Alberta ===
Results in Alberta
Party	Seats	Second	Third	Fourth	Fifth	Sixth	Votes	%	+/-
Social Credit	10	4	3				126,409	37.38	
Liberals	5	11	1				114,287	33.8	
Progressive Conservative	2	1	7	3	1		56,947	16.84	
CCF		1	4	7	1		33,689	9.96	
Independent Social Credit				2			4,598	1.36	
Labor-Progressive					1	1	2,201	0.65	
Total	17						338,131	100.0	

=== British Columbia ===
Results in British Columbia
Party	Seats	Second	Third	Fourth	Fifth	Votes	%	+/-
Liberals	11	3	2			169,018	36.66	
CCF	3	11	4			145,442	31.54	
Progressive Conservative	3	4	8			128,620	27.9	
Independent	1				1	11,992	2.6	
Labor-Progressive				3		3,887	0.84	
Social Credit				2		2,109	0.46	
Total	18					461,068	100.0	

=== Manitoba ===
Results in Manitoba
Party	Seats	Second	Third	Fourth	Votes	%	+/-
Liberals	11	4			144,665	45.08	
CCF	3	5	6		83,176	25.92	
Progressive Conservative	1	6	7	1	70,689	22.03	
Liberal-Progressive	1				9,192	2.86	
Independent		1	1	1	6,666	2.08	
Labor-Progressive			1	1	6,523	2.03	
Total	16				320,911	100.0	

=== New Brunswick ===
Results in New Brunswick
Party	Seats	Second	Third	Fourth	Votes	%	+/-
Liberals	8	2			120,369	53.82	
Progressive Conservative	2	7	1		88,049	39.37	
CCF			4	2	9,450	4.23	
Independent Liberal		1			3,084	1.38	
Union of Electors			1		2,172	0.97	
Independent			1		533	0.24	
Total	10				223,657	100.0	

=== Newfoundland and Labrador ===
Results in Newfoundland and Labrador
Party	Seats	Second	Third	Votes	%	+/-
Liberals	5	2		75,235	71.9	
Progressive Conservative	2	5		29,203	27.91	
CCF			1	197	0.19	
Total	7			104,635	100.0	

=== Northwest Territories ===
Results in Northwest Territories
Party	Seats	Second	Third	Votes	%	+/-
Liberals	1			3,284	48.96	
Independent		1		2,283	34.04	
CCF			1	1,140	17	
Total	1			6,707	100.0	

=== Nova Scotia ===
Results in Nova Scotia
Party	Seats	Second	Third	Fourth	Fifth	Votes	%	+/-
Liberals	10	3				177,680	52.66	
Progressive Conservative	2	9	2			126,365	37.46	
CCF	1		6	1	1	33,333	9.88	
Total	13					337,378	100.0	

=== Ontario ===
Results in Ontario
Party	Seats	Second	Third	Fourth	Fifth	Sixth	Votes	%	+/-
Liberals	55	26	1				912,934	45.15	
Progressive Conservative	25	54	4				757,210	37.45	
CCF	1	3	70	2			306,551	15.16	
Labor-Progressive			1	6			13,613	0.67	
Liberal-Labour	1						11,297	0.56	
Independent Liberal	1			1			6,488	0.32	
Farmer-Labour			1				6,161	0.3	
Social Credit			1	3		1	3,225	0.16	
Union of Electors				3	1		2,036	0.1	
Independent				1	1		1,304	0.06	
Independent Progressive Conservative					1		777	0.04	
Labour					1		307	0.02	
Socialist Labour				1			271	0.01	
Total	83						2,022,174	100.0	

=== Prince Edward Island ===
Results in Prince Edward Island
Party	Seats	Second	Third	Fourth	Votes	%	+/-
Liberals	3		1		33,480	49.17	
Progressive Conservative	1	3			32,989	48.45	
CCF			1	1	1,626	2.39	
Total	4				68,095	100.0	

=== Quebec ===
Results in Quebec
Party	Seats	Second	Third	Fourth	Fifth	Sixth	Votes	%	+/-
Liberals	68	5					961,974	60.37	
Progressive Conservative	2	48	8	9	1		390,565	24.51	
Independent	3	10		3	3		97,049	6.09	
Union of Electors		5	38	8			81,879	5.14	
Independent Liberal			7	1	4		20,835	1.31	
CCF			11	5	2	2	17,767	1.11	
Independent Progressive Conservative		2		2	1		7,418	0.47	
Unité nationale		1					5,590	0.35	
Nationalist		1					4,994	0.31	
Labor-Progressive		1					4,868	0.31	
Liberal-Labour				1			433	0.03	
Labour						1	108	0.01	
Total	73						1,593,480	100.0	

=== Saskatchewan ===
Results in Saskatchewan
Party	Seats	Second	Third	Fourth	Fifth	Votes	%	+/-
Liberals	14	5	1			161,887	43.41	
CCF	5	15				152,399	40.87	
Progressive Conservative	1		17	1	1	53,624	14.38	
Social Credit			1	3		3,474	0.93	
Labor-Progressive			1	1		1,531	0.41	
Total	20					372,915	100.0	
