= 1946 Hamilton, Ontario, municipal election =

1946 Hamilton municipal election
- December 9, 1946
Candidate	Samuel Lawrence	Donald A. Clarke
Party	Co-operative Commonwealth	Independent
Popular vote	37,954	26,395
Percentage	58.98%	41.02%
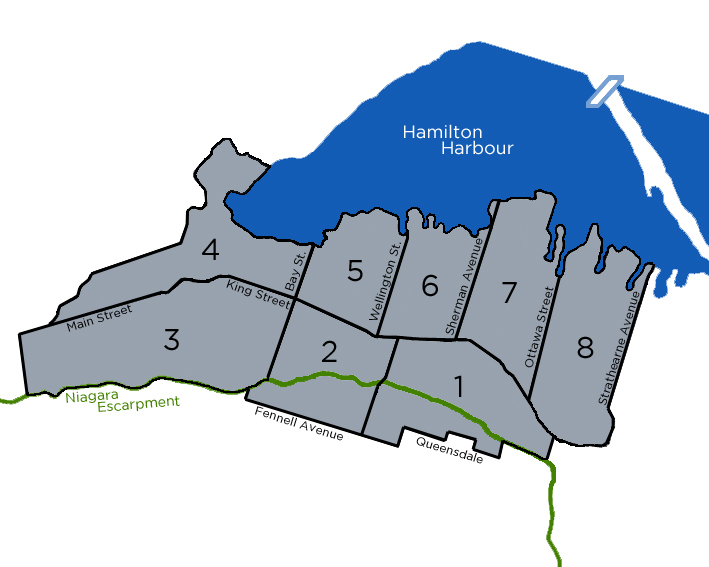
- Each of Hamilton's eight wards. Electors sent two aldermen per ward to City Hall, in addition to four controllers and one mayor elected at-large.
Mayor before election
Samuel Lawrence
Co-operative Commonwealth Federation
Elected mayor
Samuel Lawrence
Co-operative Commonwealth Federation

The 1946 Hamilton municipal election was held on December 9, 1946, to select one mayor, four controllers, and sixteen members of the Hamilton, Ontario City Council, as well as members of the local board of education. Held immediately following the 1946 Stelco strike, the election set a record for voter turnout, with 65.1% of eligible voters casting a ballot.

== Election campaign ==
In light of the city's labour situation, interest in the vote increased in the months leading up to election day, with speculation about mayoral contenders and candidates for council regular news in the Hamilton Spectator.

The Co-operative Commonwealth Federation (CCF) fielded a slate of candidates for each of the positions on council. The party nominated Sam Lawrence for the mayoralty, Roy Aindow for Board of Control, and candidates for alderman in every ward but Ward One. Only Wards Four and Seven had contested Board of Education races, the CCF nominated Norman Draker in Ward Four.

The Labor-Progressive Party nominated candidates, most notably Helen Anderson, a prominent party member and two-term Ward Seven alderman.

The Hamilton Women's Civic Club, a right-leaning organization dominated by Controller Henderson, nominated candidates for office. Henderson had received considerable public criticism for her stance on the strike at Stelco, having challenged the picketers by crossing the line in August, and subsequently becoming one of the city's strongest anti-Lawrence figures. WCC candidates campaigned on a platform of civic impartiality, despite receiving the backing of a strong political organization, and defended the actions of Henderson on the grounds of maintaining the rule of law and upholding her oath of office.

== Mayoral election ==
Sitting Mayor Sam Lawrence had amassed considerable support over the course of the summer's strike, and anti-Lawrence candidates began discussing potential scenarios in the month leading up to the vote. Controller Andrew Frame initially sought the office, but withdrew in early November in favour of either Controller Donald Clarke or Alderman Herbert Hannah. Hannah withdrew a week later, lending his support to Clarke. In his withdrawal announcement, Hannah indicated that he wished to see anti-Lawrence forces unite and remove the mayor from office. Those allied against Lawrence rallied around the conservative Clarke.

"The Mayor, himself, and his supporters, have made it clear that matters of administrative policy will be secondary issues. Backed by a powerful section of the C.C.F., Sam Lawrence has determined to seek endorsement of the electors on his record of blind partnership in office, rather than defend his inept record of municipal business administration."

— Alderman Herbert Hannah, Saturday, November 9, 1946

The early campaign was marred by allegations that the Hamilton Municipal Employees' Association, Local 167, donated to Lawrence's campaign. It was quickly revealed that the Local's financial secretary, C. P. Goodes, was responsible and was removed from his position upon the circulation of a petition signed by 90% of employees at City Hall. The issue was quickly resolved and the union distanced itself from the actions of Goodes following a meeting of their membership.

The Lawrence campaign was centred on "constructive change" and the mayor's 21-year tenure on council. The main issues the mayor ran on were the extension of the franchise to all citizens of legal age, supporting existing social services, extending public ownership over utilities, and the widening of King William Street.

Clarke's campaign made an issue of Lawrence's pomitical affiliations, running on the importance of an impartial and independent citizen occupying the office of Mayor. The controller promised that his administration would "protect individual rights [and] safeguard our economic assets."

The issue of partisanship proved to be a major point of contention between the candidates and, during a community forum at Westdale Secondary School, Lawrence and Clarke traded barbs over affiliation. Clarke argued that "the basic issue at stake is whether we are to have a party-free administration of one dominated by a political party", prompting Lawrence to fire back with "It is well-known to the people of this city where I stand...At least [the C.C.F. is] clean and above board. We prepare a program and present it to the electorate; we don't disguise ourselves," a reference to Clarke's own Conservative affiliations.

On election night, Lawrence and Clarke remained close, with the mayor's margin over his competitor increasing steadily as returns came in from across the city. At 10:30, Clarke conceded defeat to Lawrence after capturing only Wards One, Two, and Three.

Summary of the December 9, 1946 Hamilton, Ontario mayoral election
Candidate	Endorsing party	Popular vote		
Candidate	Endorsing party	#	%	±%
Samuel Lawrence (incumbent)	CCF	37,954	59%	n/a
Donald Clarke	Independent	26,395	41%	n/a
Total votes		64,349	62.27%	n/a
Registered voters		103,334	100%	
Note: Candidate campaign colours are based on their supporting party's or group's colour.
Sources: "Don Clarke On Top In Three Wards, Final Figures Show", Hamilton Spectator, News, December 11, 1946, pp. 15.

== Board of Control election ==
The campaign for Board of Control was more tense than in previous years thanks to the large number of candidates who entered the race. The fight for the four seats on the Board became highly ideological, pitting the right-leaning Controllers Nora-Frances Henderson, Hugh McDermid McIntyre, and William Alfred Weir, as well as Ward One Alderman Herbert Hannah and Ward Five Alderman Douglas Belling Gordon, against a broad spectrum of candidates on the left, notably the Labor-Progressive Party nominee Helen Anderson, who was a Ward Seven alderman, and the C.C.F. candidate, Roy Aindow. Andrew Frame, a veteran and former controller, and Walter Thomas Carroll comprised the remainder of the nine-candidate field.

Henderson remained a favourite throughout the race. A 12-term controller at the time of the election, the politically conservative Henderson became the de facto leader of the anti-Lawrence faction on Council. Henderson was heartily endorsed by the Hamilton Spectator, who called her, "One of the best public servants this city has ever had. A woman of integrity, intelligence and great courage," and was the focus of a full-page photo spread, chronicling her average day on the campaign trail. Her campaign centred primarily on her political independence, as well as her opposition to a proposal to widen King William Street, and her support for open-shop unionization of the city's employees, noting that she could not, "be a party to the union shop which would compel us to refuse work to a man or woman who did not want to join a union."

Considerable attention was paid to Helen Anderson, the sitting Ward Seven alderman and organizer for the Labor-Progressive Party. In a profile by the Hamilton Spectator, she was described as a "shrewd, aggressive, extreme Leftist." Central to her campaign was more housing for the city's working-class residents, a better redistribution of wealth, and a move away from a business-centred approach to municipal governance. The Spectator dedicated an editorial to her candidacy, writing that "those who sleep on the assurance that this minority is a bit of a joke may find out too late that it is anything but a joke."

Andrew Frame was an incumbent controller, veteran of World Wars I and II and the former secretary of the Hamilton Boy Scouts. His platform took issue with a proposal to widen King William Street, which he opposed on financial grounds, improving housing for veterans, and developing a bathing beach for the city's youth

Hugh McDermid McIntyre was a Scottish-Canadian printer and sitting member of the Board of Control.

Roy Aindow was a World War I veteran, union organizer and candidate supported by the Cooperative Commonwealth Federation. The Hamilton Spectator described Aindow as "Intelligent, likable, [and] a conscientious partisan." Aindow ran on his record of serving in the military, and vowed to improve labour relations in the city and building more public housing.

Two of the prominent candidates in the race were William Alfred Weir and Herbert Reginald Hannah. Weir was a sitting member of the Board of Control, and, as the Spectator noted, "not inclined to controversy," while Hannah was one of Ward 1's aldermen, described by the Hamilton Spectator as "aggressive, keen, competent."

Douglas Belling Gordon was, at the time, an alderman for Ward Five, and was viewed as a critic of the administration. Gordon campaigned on providing housing for returning veterans and installing parking meters to provide revenue for civic improvement projects. Rounding out the field was Walter Thomas Carroll, who was listed as having no fixed employment and a "well-known figure in Ward 5." Carroll ran on a platform of better sewage management for the city after a personal campaign to clean up Hamilton Harbour attracted the interest of the Drew government.

Candidates for the December 9, 1946 Hamilton, Ontario Board of Control election
Candidate	Endorsing party	Popular vote	
Candidate	Endorsing party	%	±%
Nora-Frances Henderson (incumbent)	Women's Civic Club	27,523	1
Helen Anderson	Labor-Progressive	24,568	2
Andrew Hamilton Frame (incumbent)	Independent	24,349	3
Hugh McDermid McIntyre (incumbent)	Independent	23,146	4
Roy Aindow	CCF	20,842	5
William Alfred Weir (incumbent)	Independent	19,066	6
Herbert Reginald Hannah	Independent	17,938	7
Douglas Belling Gordon	Independent	12,670	8
Walter Thomas Carroll	Independent	2,801	9
Total votes		n/a	100%
Registered voters		103,334	n/a
Note: Candidate campaign colours are based on their supporting party's or group's colour.
Sources: "Results: Board of Control", Hamilton Spectator, Tuesday, December 10, 1946, pp. 15.

== Aldermanic elections ==
Summary of the December 9, 1946 Hamilton, Ontario Ward One alderman election
Candidate	Endorsing party	Popular vote		
Candidate	Endorsing party	#	%	±%
Leslie Parker (incumbent)	Independent	5,830	59.44%	n/a
Henry Arnott Hicks	Independent Liberal	4,422	45.08%	n/a
Charles Flaherty	Independent	2,462	25.1%	n/a
Gordon McLelland	Independent	1,941	19.78%	n/a
William Thompson	Independent	941	9.59%	n/a
Total votes		9,808	68.8%	n/a
Registered voters		14,241	100%	
Note 1: Candidate campaign colours are based on their supporting party's or group's colour. Note 2: Each Ward elected two aldermen to represent them at City Council.
Sources: "Results: Aldermen", Hamilton Spectator, News, Tuesday, December 10, 1946, pp. 15.
