= Leon Crestohl =

Canadian politician

Leon David Crestohl

Member of the Canadian Parliament for Cartier
- In office 1950–1963
- Preceded by: Maurice Hartt
- Succeeded by: Milton L. Klein

Personal details
- Born: May 7, 1900 Warsaw, Congress Poland, Russian Empire
- Died: March 21, 1963 (aged 62)
- Party: Liberal
- Relations: Hyman Meyer Crestohl, father

Leon David Crestohl, QC (May 7, 1900 – March 21, 1963) was a Canadian lawyer and politician.

Born in Warsaw, Vistula Land (now Poland), the son of Rabbi Hyman Meyer Crestohl (1865–1928), he emigrated with his family to Canada in 1911 living in Quebec City before moving to Montreal in 1919. Crestohl was educated at McGill University and the Université de Montréal. He was called to the Quebec Bar in 1926 and was made a King's Counsel in 1944. During World War II, he served as Crown Counsel for the Wartime Prices and Trade Board in Montreal.

Crestohl was elected to the House of Commons of Canada for Cartier in a 1950 by-election held after the death of the previous MP, Maurice Hartt. A Liberal, he was re-elected in 1953, 1957, 1958, and 1962, and sat in the house until his death on March 21, 1963.

His great-great-nephew, David de Burgh Graham, was elected in the 2015 Canadian federal election as the Liberal candidate in Laurentides—Labelle.
