= Marvin Gelber =

Canadian politician

Member of Parliament for York South
- In office April 1963 – November 1965

Personal details
- Born: 1 November 1912 Toronto, Ontario, Canada
- Died: 5 October 1990 (aged 77)
- Party: Liberal
- Profession: businessman, merchant

Marvin Gelber (1 November 1912 – 5 October 1990) was a Liberal party member of the House of Commons of Canada. He was born in Toronto, Ontario and became a businessman and merchant by career.

Gelber was born in 1912 to Sara and Louis Gelber. His father was an Austrian Jew who, along his brother, Moses, emigrated to Toronto in 1896 where they settled and worked as textile wholesalers. He grew up in a Zionist house along with four siblings.

He was first elected at the York South riding in the 1963 general election after defeats there in the 1957, 1958 and 1962 elections. After serving his only term, the 26th Canadian Parliament, Gelber was defeated at York South in the 1965 federal election by David Lewis of the New Democratic Party who held the seat prior to Gelber's victory in 1963.
