= Carl Goldenberg =

Canadian politician

The Hon. Hyman Carl Goldenberg

Senator for Rigaud senate division
- In office 1971–1982
- Appointed by: Pierre Trudeau
- Preceded by: Lazarus Phillips
- Succeeded by: Jean Le Moyne

Personal details
- Born: October 20, 1907 Montreal, Quebec, Canada
- Died: July 22, 1996 (aged 88) Toronto, Ontario, Canada
- Party: Liberal
- Children: Eddie Goldenberg

Hyman Carl Goldenberg, OC OBE QC (October 20, 1907 – July 22, 1996) was a Canadian lawyer, arbitrator, mediator, and senator who is best known for his work as an arbitrator in major labour management disputes.

Born in Montreal, Quebec, Goldenberg received a Master of Arts degree in Economics and Political Science in 1929 and a Bachelor of Civil Law degree in 1932 from McGill University. He was called to the Quebec Bar in 1932. He was a lecturer at McGill from 1932 to 1936 and from 1944 to 1948.

He was appointed to the Senate by Pierre Elliott Trudeau in 1971 and served until his retirement in 1982. He was a constitutional advisor to three prime ministers—Mackenzie King, Pierre Elliott Trudeau and Jean Chrétien—and participated in 20 royal commissions and led numerous boards and special inquiries. He was the chairman of the Standing Senate Committee on Legal and Constitutional Affairs and a member of the Senate–House of Commons committee on the Constitution of Canada, which at that point he co-chaired.

== Honours ==
In 1946, he was made an Officer of the Order of the British Empire for his work during World War II. In 1967 he was made an Officer of the Order of Canada. In 1974, he was awarded an honorary Doctor of Laws degree from the University of British Columbia.

== Archives ==
There is a Carl Goldenberg fonds at Library and Archives Canada. There is an H. Carl Goldenberg fonds at Queen's University Archives.
