= Harry Blank =

Canadian politician (born 1925)

Member of the National Assembly of Quebec for Montréal–Saint-Louis
- In office 1960–1966
- Preceded by: Dave Rochon
- Succeeded by: District abolished

Member of the National Assembly of Quebec for Saint-Louis
- In office 1966–1985
- Preceded by: District created
- Succeeded by: Jacques Chagnon

Personal details
- Born: May 24, 1925 Montreal, Quebec, Canada
- Party: Liberal
- Education: McGill University
- Profession: Lawyer, politician
- Awards: Queen's Counsel

Military service
- Branch/service: Canadian Army

Harry Blank KC (born May 24, 1925) is a Canadian politician from Quebec and a seven-term member of the National Assembly of Quebec.

== Early background ==
Blank is Jewish. He was born on May 24, 1925, in Montreal, Quebec, and was the son of Udel Blank and Molly Zinman. He served in the Canadian Army during World War II, serving during the waning months of the war in Europe. He attended college at McGill University and was admitted to the Bar of Quebec in 1950.

== Political career ==
In the 1960 election, Blank ran as a Liberal candidate in the provincial district of Montréal–Saint-Louis. Even though the Liberal vote was divided between his supporters and those of incumbent Dave Rochon, he narrowly won the election. He was easily re-elected in 1962; and in the district of Saint-Louis he was re-elected in the 1966, 1970, 1973, 1976 and 1981 elections. He was appointed Deputy Vice President of the National Assembly in 1971 and was Vice President (Deputy Speaker) of that institution from 1973 until 1976.

== Decline ==
In the 1985 election, Official Opposition Leader Robert Bourassa prevented Blank from running as a Liberal candidate and offered the nomination to star candidate Jacques Chagnon.

Blank refused to retire from politics and ran as an Independent candidate. He received 20% of the vote and finished third behind Chagnon, who won the election, and the Parti Québécois candidate.

== Retirement ==
After his defeat, Blank returned to law practice. He had been named Queen's Counsel in 1971. He still resides in Montreal.

== See also ==
- Politics of Quebec
- Quebec general elections
- Quebec Liberal Party

== Footnotes ==
National Assembly of Quebec
Preceded by Dave Rochon (Liberal)	MLA for Montréal–Saint-Louis; 1960–1966	Succeeded by None, district abolished
Preceded by None, district created	MLA / MNA for Saint-Louis; 1966–1985	Succeeded by Jacques Chagnon (Liberal)
