= Montréal–Saint-Louis =

Quebec electoral district

Defunct provincial electoral district
- Legislature: National Assembly of Quebec
- District created: 1912
- District abolished: 1965
- First contested: 1912
- Last contested: 1962

Montréal–Saint-Louis (French pronunciation: [mɔ̃ʁeal sɛ̃ lwi]) was a former provincial electoral district in the Montreal region of Quebec, Canada that elected members to the Legislative Assembly of Quebec.

It was created for the 1912 election from part of Montréal division no. 3 electoral district. Its final election was in 1962. It disappeared in the 1966 election and its successor electoral district was Saint-Louis.

== Members of the Legislative Assembly ==
- Godfroy Langlois, Liberal (1912–1916)
- Peter Bercovitch, Liberal (1916–1938)
- Louis Fitch, Union Nationale (1938–1939)
- Maurice Hartt, Liberal (1939–1948)
- Dave Rochon, Liberal (1948–1960)
- Harry Blank, Liberal (1960–1966)

== Partial election results ==
1936 Quebec general election
| Party | Candidate | Votes | % |
|---|---|---|---|
| Liberal | Peter Bercovitch | 2,024 | 58.83 |
| Union Nationale | Louis-Gédéon Gravel | 773 | 22.47 |
| Communist | Fred Rosenberg (Rose) | 578 | 16.80 |
| Independent Union Nationale | Éphrem-J. Cuerrier | 65 | 1.88 |
