= Lazarus Phillips =

Canadian politician (1895–1986)

The Hon. Lazarus Phillips

Senator for Rigaud senate division
- In office 1968–1970
- Appointed by: Lester B. Pearson
- Preceded by: Vincent Dupuis
- Succeeded by: Carl Goldenberg

Personal details
- Born: October 10, 1895 Montreal, Quebec, Canada
- Died: December 30, 1986 (aged 91)
- Party: Liberal

Lazarus Phillips, OBE QC (October 10, 1895 – December 30, 1986) was a Canadian lawyer and Senator.

Born in Montreal, Quebec, he served with the Canadian Expeditionary Force in Siberia during World War I. In 1918, he received a Bachelor of Civil Law from McGill University and was called to the Quebec Bar in 1920. A practicing lawyer, he was a senior partner of the Montreal law firm, Phillips and Vineberg (now Davies Ward Phillips & Vineberg).

A member of the Liberal Party of Canada, he ran unsuccessfully for the House of Commons of Canada in the riding of Cartier in the 1943 by-election, losing to Communist Party member Fred Rose (he also garnered more votes than future NDP leader, David Lewis). He was called to the senate in 1968 representing the senatorial division of Rigaud, Quebec. He retired in 1970.

A prominent member of the Montreal Jewish community, he was president of the school, United Talmud Torahs of Montreal. He was a director and vice-president of the Royal Bank of Canada.

The Senator Lazarus Phillips Chair in General History in the Faculty of Jewish Studies at Bar-Ilan University is named in his honour.
