= Milton L. Klein =

Canadian politician (1910 - 2007)

- Official 1966 portrait

Member of the Canadian Parliament for Cartier
- In office 1963–1968
- Preceded by: Leon Crestohl
- Succeeded by: District was abolished in 1966 and redistributed into Laurier, Outremont and Saint-Jacques ridings.

Personal details
- Born: February 21, 1910 Montreal, Quebec, Canada
- Died: December 31, 2007 (aged 97) Montreal, Quebec, Canada
- Party: Liberal
- Spouse: Dorothy
- Occupation: lawyer

Milton Lowen Klein, QC (February 21, 1910 – December 31, 2007) was a Montreal lawyer, a member of Parliament in the Canadian House of Commons, and a figure in the Jewish-Canadian community.

== Personal life ==
Klein was born in 1910 in Montreal, Quebec. His parents were real estate agents who migrated from Hungary. He was one of five children. He was educated at Fairmont High and at Strathcona Academy, and obtained his law degree from Université de Montréal in 1933.

Klein eloped with his wife, Dorothy Ruby, on New Year's Eve, 1935. They had two children. He was active in the Jewish community and was a member of the executive council of the Canadian Jewish Congress and a co-chairman of the Israel Bond Organization. His wife, Dorothy, died in 1991.

== Political career ==
Klein was drafted as the Liberal candidate in the largely Jewish riding of Cartier when the incumbent Liberal MP Leon Crestohl died suddenly during the 1963 federal election campaign. He served for two terms, in the Parliaments elected in 1963 and 1965. He retired before the 1968 federal election when the riding of Cartier was abolished due to redistribution. During his time in Parliament, he was twice the chair of the Standing Committee on Indian Affairs, Human Rights and Citizenship and Immigration.

In 1964, Klein introduced a private member's bill which would have been Canada's first hate crimes legislation had it been passed. Bill C-21 proposed the death penalty for anyone who committed murder with genocide in mind and a mandatory 10-year sentence for anyone who, with genocide in mind, caused bodily harm or deliberately inflicted conditions designed to bring about the physical destruction of a group. The bill was intended to "outlaw not only Nazi-type hatred, but all hatred". However, it died on the Order Paper when the prime minister, Lester Pearson, called the federal election of 1965.

In January 1965, the federal government appointed the Special Committee on Hate Propaganda in Canada, chaired by Maxwell Cohen and including Pierre Trudeau (at that time a law professor at the Université de Montréal). The committee's mandate was to study the issue of hate propaganda and make recommendations on legislation. One of the first things the committee did was to meet with members of Parliament who were interested in the issue, including Klein, to co-ordinate the work of the committee and the members of Parliament.

In 1966, the Cohen Committee reported in favour of legislation. The Pearson government then introduced a bill to amend the Criminal Code, making it an offence to advocate genocide, similar to Klein's draft bill. The bill also created an offence of publicly inciting hatred in a way likely to induce a breach of the peace, and a third offence, of wilfully promoting hatred. The government bill took four years to wend its way through Parliament but, in 1970, it was passed by the federal government of Pierre Trudeau, now prime minister.

Klein was also a proponent of bilingualism and French immersion in schools and was an advocate of the new maple leaf flag during the Great Flag Debate.

== Death ==
Klein was admitted to Montreal Jewish General Hospital two weeks before his death. He died there on December 31, 2007, at the age of 97. He was survived by his two daughters, Johanne and Elise.
