= Cartier (electoral district) =

Former federal electoral district in Quebec, Canada

Quebec electoral district

Defunct federal electoral district
- Legislature: House of Commons
- District created: 1924
- District abolished: 1966
- First contested: 1925
- Last contested: 1965

Cartier was a federal electoral district in Quebec, Canada, that was represented in the House of Commons of Canada from 1925 to 1968. The riding covered much of Montreal's old Jewish district (from 1933 including parts of the Mile End neighbourhood). It was one of the smallest ridings in the country in area.

It was created in 1924 from parts of George-Étienne Cartier riding.

Cartier is the only riding in Canada to have elected a Communist to the House of Commons: Fred Rose, who was elected in a 1943 by-election, and re-elected in 1945. Rose ran under the banner of the Labor-Progressive Party, which was a front organization for the banned Communist Party of Canada during the 1940s and 1950s. Sam Jacobs was the riding's MP for many years and was in his final years also the president of the Canadian Jewish Congress.

The electoral district was abolished in 1966 when it was redistributed into Laurier, Outremont and Saint-Jacques ridings.

Every single MP to represent this riding was Jewish.

== Members of Parliament ==
Parliament	Years	Member	Party
Cartier; Riding created from George-Étienne Cartier
15th	1925–1926	Samuel William Jacobs	Liberal
16th	1926–1930	Samuel William Jacobs	Liberal
17th	1930–1935	Samuel William Jacobs	Liberal
18th	1935–1938	Samuel William Jacobs	Liberal
18th	1938–1940	Peter Bercovitch	Liberal
19th	1940–1942	Peter Bercovitch	Liberal
19th	1943–1945	Fred Rose	Labor–Progressive
20th	1945–1947	Fred Rose	Labor–Progressive
20th	1947–1949	Maurice Hartt	Liberal
21st	1949–1950	Maurice Hartt	Liberal
21st	1950–1953	Leon Crestohl	Liberal
22nd	1953–1957	Leon Crestohl	Liberal
23rd	1957–1958	Leon Crestohl	Liberal
24th	1958–1962	Leon Crestohl	Liberal
25th	1962–1963	Leon Crestohl	Liberal
26th	1963–1965	Milton L. Klein	Liberal
27th	1965–1968	Milton L. Klein	Liberal
Riding dissolved into Laurier, Outremont and Saint-Jacques

== Election results ==
1965 Canadian federal election
Party	Candidate	Votes	%	±%
Liberal	Milton L. Klein	5,389	50.64	+1.48
Progressive Conservative	Andrew Henry Pytel	2,209	20.76	+0.12
New Democratic	John Kambites	1,903	17.88	+3.68
Ralliement créditiste	Gérard Ledoux	1,141	10.72	–5.28
Total valid votes		10,642	100.0	
Liberal hold		Swing		+0.68
Change for the Ralliement créiditiste is based on the results of the Social Credit.

1963 Canadian federal election
Party	Candidate	Votes	%	±%
Liberal	Milton L. Klein	6,642	49.16	–0.12
Progressive Conservative	Charles S. Barden	2,788	20.64	–6.67
Social Credit	Georges Binette	2,162	16.00	+6.84
New Democratic	William I. Miller	1,918	14.20	–0.06
Total valid votes		13,510	100.0	
Liberal hold		Swing		+3.28

1962 Canadian federal election
Party	Candidate	Votes	%	±%
Liberal	Leon Crestohl	6,464	49.28	+5.44
Progressive Conservative	Charles S. Barden	3,582	27.31	–15.01
New Democratic	William I. Miller	1,871	14.26	+9.86
Social Credit	Sylvio-Fernando Melancon	1,201	9.16	
Total valid votes		13,118	100.0	
Liberal hold		Swing		+10.22
Change for the New Democrats is based on the results of the Co-operative Commonwealth.

1958 Canadian federal election
Party	Candidate	Votes	%	±%
Liberal	Leon Crestohl	7,097	43.84	–29.08
Progressive Conservative	Hyman Bernard Brock	6,850	42.32	+30.68
Independent Liberal	Samuel Kolomeir	1,528	9.44	–0.43
Co-operative Commonwealth	Michael Wozniak	713	4.40	+0.27
Total valid votes		16,188	100.0	
Liberal hold		Swing		–29.88

1957 Canadian federal election
Party	Candidate	Votes	%	±%
Liberal	Leon Crestohl	11,955	72.92	–3.98
Progressive Conservative	Aldo Lattik	1,909	11.64	+5.07
Independent Liberal	Samuel Kolomeir	1,618	9.87	
Co-operative Commonwealth	Michael Wozniak	677	4.13	–1.90
Independent Liberal	Moses Zalman Miller	236	1.44	+0.25
Total valid votes		16,395	100.0	
Liberal hold		Swing		–4.52

1953 Canadian federal election
Party	Candidate	Votes	%	±%
Liberal	Leon Crestohl	12,493	76.90	+22.76
Progressive Conservative	Tadeusz Brzezinski	1,068	6.57	–9.24
Co-operative Commonwealth	Hector Rochon	980	6.03	–2.19
Labor–Progressive	Harry Binder	896	5.52	–16.32
Independent Progressive Conservative	Marcel Hotte	616	3.79	
Independent Liberal	Moses Miller	193	1.19	
Total valid votes		16,246	100.0	
Liberal hold		Swing		+16.00

Canadian federal by-election, 19 June 1950 On the death of Maurice Hartt, 15 March 1950
Party	Candidate	Votes	%	±%
Liberal	Leon Crestohl	9,701	54.14	+1.39
Labor–Progressive	Harry Binder	3,913	21.84	+0.43
Progressive Conservative	Maurice-S. Hebert	2,833	15.81	+4.22
Co-operative Commonwealth	Kalmen Kaplansky	1,473	8.22	–6.02
Total valid votes		17,920	100.0	
Liberal hold		Swing		+0.48

1949 Canadian federal election
Party	Candidate	Votes	%	±%
Liberal	Maurice Hartt	11,993	52.75	+13.69
Labor–Progressive	Harry Binder	4,868	21.41	–5.37
Co-operative Commonwealth	Abraham M. Klein	3,238	14.24	
Progressive Conservative	Maurice-S. Hebert	2,636	11.59	
Total valid votes		22,735	100.0	
Liberal hold		Swing		+9.53

Canadian federal by-election, 31 March 1947 On Fred Rose's seat being declared vacant by House of Commons resolution, 30 January 1947
Party	Candidate	Votes	%	±%
Liberal	Maurice Hartt	9,649	39.06	+4.02
Autonomist	Paul Masse	6,929	28.05	
Labor–Progressive	Michael Buhay	6,616	26.78	–14.06
Independent	David Rochon	1,323	5.36	
Independent	Onil Léonide Gingras	142	0.57	
Independent	Louis Valiquette	45	0.18	
Total valid votes		24,704	100.0	
Liberal gain from Labor–Progressive		Swing		–12.02

1945 Canadian federal election
Party	Candidate	Votes	%	±%
Labor–Progressive	Fred Rose	10,413	40.84	+10.42
Liberal	Samuel Edgar Schwisberg	8,935	35.04	+13.07
Bloc populaire	Paul Masse	6,148	24.11	–5.52
Total valid votes		25,496	100.00	
Labor–Progressive hold		Swing		–1.32

Canadian federal by-election, August 9, 1943 Death of Peter Bercovitch
Party	Candidate	Votes	%	±%
Labor–Progressive	Fred Rose	5,789	30.42	–
Bloc populaire	Paul Masse	5,639	29.63	–
Liberal	Lazarus Phillips	4,180	21.97	–66.57
Co-operative Commonwealth	David Lewis	3,313	17.41	–
Independent	Moses Miller	109	0.57	–
Total valid votes		19,030	100.00	
Labor–Progressive gain from Liberal		Swing		–
Source: Library of Parliament

1940 Canadian federal election
Party	Candidate	Votes	%	±%
Liberal	Peter Bercovitch	18,191	88.54	+23.27
National Labour	Arthur Ainey	2,354	11.46	–
Total valid votes		20,545	100.0	
Liberal hold		Swing		–
Source: Library of Parliament

Canadian federal by-election, 7 November 1938 On the death of Samuel William Jacobs, 21 August 1938
Party	Candidate	Votes
Liberal	Peter Bercovitch	acclaimed

1935 Canadian federal election
Party	Candidate	Votes	%	±%
Liberal	Samuel William Jacobs	13,574	65.27	–3.36
Communist	Fred Rose	3,385	16.28	
Independent Liberal	Paul-Emile Goyette	1,531	7.36	
Reconstruction	Salluste Lavery	1,362	6.55	
Conservative	Herman Julien	945	4.54	–11.54
Total valid votes		20,797	100.0	
Liberal hold		Swing		–9.82

1930 Canadian federal election
Party	Candidate	Votes	%	±%
Liberal	Samuel William Jacobs	8,231	68.63	+18.53
Conservative	Louis Wolfe	1,928	16.08	–6.87
Independent Progressive	Médéric Masson	1,294	10.79	
Independent Liberal	Paul-E. Parent	540	4.50	–15.78
Total valid votes		11,993	100.0	
Liberal hold		Swing		+12.70

1926 Canadian federal election
Party	Candidate	Votes	%	±%
Liberal	Samuel William Jacobs	5,048	50.10	–11.77
Conservative	Louis Wolfe	2,312	22.95	
Independent Liberal	Paul-Ernest Parent	2,043	20.28	
Socialist	Michael Buhay	672	6.67	
Total valid votes		10,075	100.0	
Liberal hold		Swing		–17.36

1925 Canadian federal election
Party	Candidate	Votes	%
Liberal	Samuel William Jacobs	7,934	61.87
Independent Liberal	Joseph Alfred Bernier	4,889	38.13
Total valid votes		12,823	100.0
This riding was created from parts of George-Étienne Cartier, where Liberal Samuel William Jacobs was the incumbent.

== See also ==
- List of Canadian electoral districts
- Historical federal electoral districts of Canada
