= Maurice Hartt =

Romanian-born Canadian politician

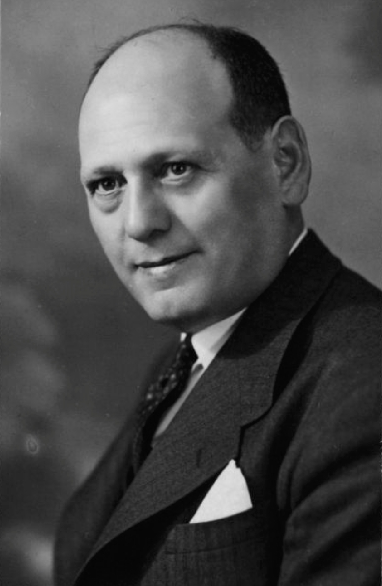

Member of the Canadian Parliament for Cartier
- In office March 31, 1947 – March 15, 1950
- Preceded by: Fred Rose
- Succeeded by: Leon Crestohl

Member of the Legislative Assembly of Quebec for Montréal–Saint-Louis
- In office 1939–1947
- Preceded by: Louis Fitch
- Succeeded by: Dave Rochon

Personal details
- Born: April 15, 1895 Dorohoi, Romania
- Died: March 15, 1950 (aged 54) Montreal, Quebec, Canada
- Resting place: Shaar Hashomayim Cemetery, Montreal
- Party: Liberal
- Other political affiliations: Quebec Liberal Party
- Spouse: Rose Gertrude Gallay
- Children: Stanley Hartt Joel Hartt
- Education: Queen's University

Maurice Hartt, KC (April 15, 1895 – March 15, 1950) was a Romanian-born Canadian politician.

== Biography ==
Born in Dorohoi, Romania, the son of Saul Hartt and Malia Segal, he immigrated to Canada when he was twelve. He studied law at Queen's University and was called to the Quebec Bar in 1935. He was created a King's Counsel in 1942 and practiced law in Montreal. He was elected to the Legislative Assembly of Quebec in the riding of Montréal–Saint-Louis in 1939. A Liberal, he was re-elected in 1944. He resigned in 1947, when he was elected to the House of Commons of Canada in the riding of Cartier in a 1947 by-election called when Fred Rose's seat was declared vacant by a resolution of the House of Commons. A federal Liberal, he was re-elected in 1949. He died in office in 1950.

His son, Stanley Hartt, was Prime Minister Brian Mulroney's Chief of Staff from 1989 to 1990. Another son, Joel Hartt (1940–2009), was a professor of Humanities at John Abbott College and Chairman of the Lakeshore School Board.
