= Fred Rose (politician) =

Canadian politician (1907–1983)

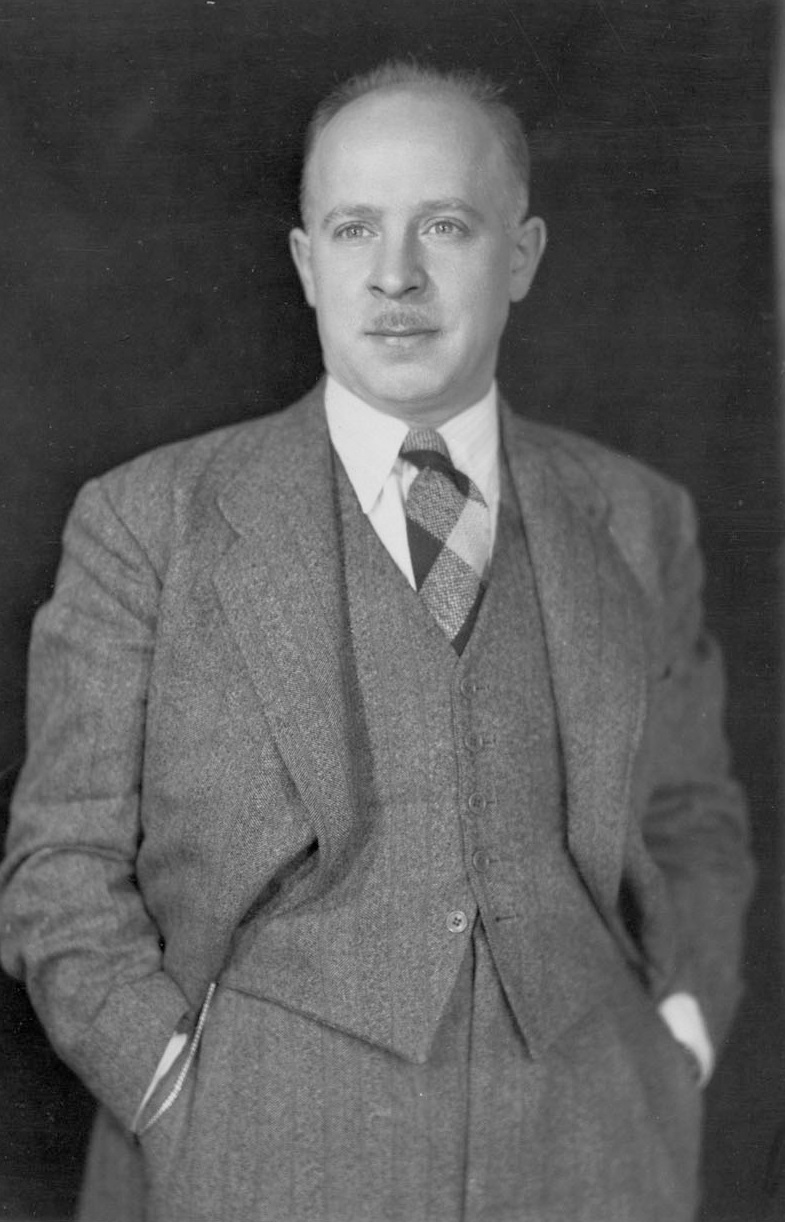

Member of Parliament for Cartier
- In office 9 August 1943 – 30 January 1947
- Preceded by: Peter Bercovitch
- Succeeded by: Maurice Hartt

Personal details
- Born: Fishel Rosenberg; 7 December 1907 Lublin, Russian Empire
- Died: 16 March 1983 (aged 75) Warsaw, Poland
- Party: Labor-Progressive
- Occupation: Electrician

Fred Rose (born Fishel Rosenberg; 7 December 1907 – 16 March 1983) was a Polish-Canadian politician and trade union organizer, best known for being the only member of the Canadian Parliament to ever be convicted of a charge related to spying for a foreign country. A member of the Communist Party of Canada and Labor-Progressive Party, he served as the MP for Cartier from 1943 to 1947. He was expelled from his seat after being found guilty of conspiring to steal weapons research for the Soviet Union.

Shortly after his release from prison, Rose moved to Poland to start an import-export business. While there, his Canadian citizenship was revoked, which prevented him from returning to Canada. His appeal against the revoking of his citizenship ultimately failed, but in 1958, then Minister of Citizenship and Immigration Ellen Fairclough introduced the "Fred Rose amendment" to the Citizenship Act so that such a removal of Canadian citizenship could never happen again.

== Early life ==
Rose was born to a Polish Jewish family in Lublin, which was then part of the Russian Empire and now is in Poland. One of the six children in the family, he attended the "Gymnase Humaniste de Lublin," a Jewish high school in which he learned to speak French. He emigrated to Canada as a child in 1920, where he attended Baron Byng High School.

== Communism ==
In 1925, he became involved with the Young Communist League of Canada and then joined the Communist Party of Canada while he was working in a canning factory. By 1928, he became a person of interest for the Royal Canadian Mounted Police. In April 1931, he published the pamphlet "Smash the Embargo" in which he made his political goals clear. In his view, the Communist Party of Canada was to "lead the Canadian workers to establish a system similar to that of the Soviet Union."

Rose was jailed during the 1930s for sedition, and won the hatred of Quebec Premier Maurice Duplessis for writing about the close connections between the Duplessis government and the fascist governments of Adolf Hitler and Benito Mussolini. He was a close associate of Norman Bethune, a doctor who had aided antifascist and communist fighters first in Spain during the Spanish Civil War and later in China.

== Electoral career ==
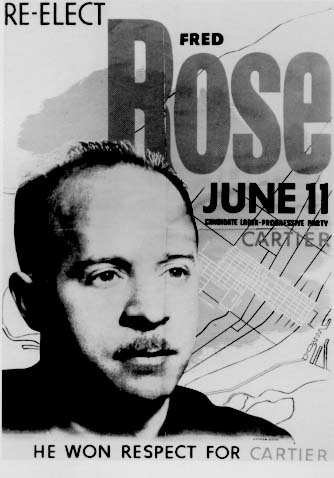
1945 election poster

He was a candidate for the Communist Party of Canada in the working-class riding of Cartier, in the Montreal area in the 1935 federal election, coming in second with 16.28% of the votes. He ran in the 1936 Quebec general election in the riding of Montréal–Saint-Louis for the Communist Party of Quebec and came in third, at 16.8%.

In the early stages of World War II, the Communist Party of Canada was formally banned, and many of its leaders interned by the Padlock Law. After a major public campaign, the party was legally reorganized as the Labor-Progressive Party.

Rose ran as a Labor-Progressive candidate in a 1943 by-election in the federal riding of Cartier. He won with 30% of the vote in a tight four-way race, beating David Lewis of the social democratic Co-operative Commonwealth Federation (CCF) and two others. He was the first, and, as of 2025, remains the only, Communist Party MP elected in Canada.

Rose was re-elected in the 1945 election with 40% of the vote. Most of the riding's immigrant Jewish population voted for Rose, who benefitted from the perception that the Soviet Union was the main hope for saving Europe's Jews from Hitler. Rose's main rival, Paul Massé, of the antiwar Bloc Populaire, who came second, was supported by most French-Canadians. Rose was also endorsed by American actor and Communist activist Paul Robeson.

As a Member of Parliament, Rose proposed the first federal medicare legislation and the first anti-hate legislation.

== Gouzenko Affair ==
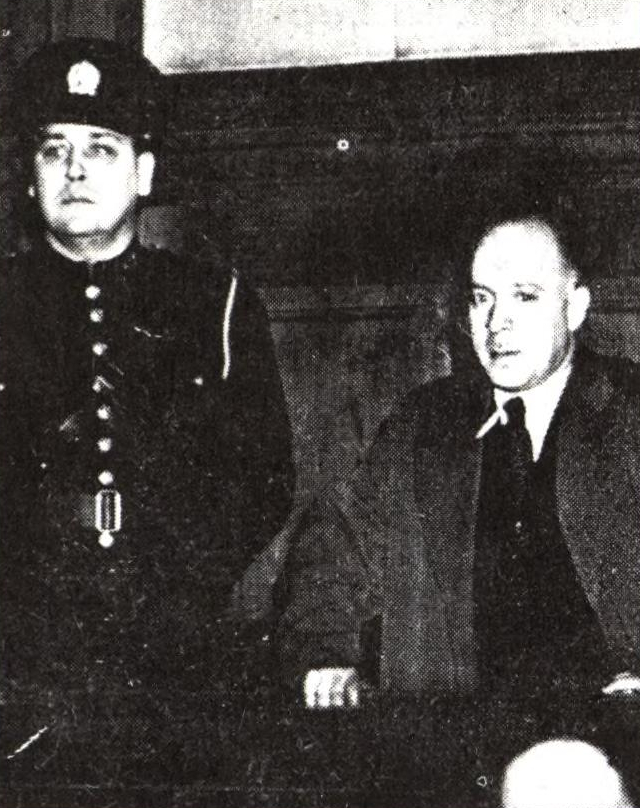
Rose (right) c. 1946

Rose was caught up in the world political sea change following World War II, when the Soviet Union, a major wartime ally, was now perceived as an enemy in the new reality of the Cold War. Igor Gouzenko, a young cipher clerk in the Soviet embassy in Ottawa, was recalled to his homeland in July 1945. Rather than return home, Gouzenko defected with documents in September 1945 and claimed to have evidence of a massive Soviet spy ring operating in Canada and the United States.

Few took Gouzenko's accusations and evidence seriously at first. A royal commission of inquiry, the Kellock–Taschereau Commission, was ultimately established by the government of William Lyon Mackenzie King in February 1946 to investigate Gouzenko's evidence. Headed by two Supreme Court justices, Roy Kellock and Robert Taschereau, the commission arrested and sequestered Canadians named in Gouzenko's documents without legal counsel and barred them from all contact with the outside world until they were summoned before the commission.

Rose was alleged to lead the ring of up to 20 Soviet spies, which were targeting primarily atomic weapon research from the Manhattan Project. Raymond Boyer, an alleged co-conspirator, testified that Rose was involved in the operation. Rose refused to testify before the commission, which he said was designed to "smear honest and patriotic Canadians." Rose was ultimately found guilty of conspiring to turn over information about the explosive RDX to the Soviets, and was sentenced to six years in prison, a term just one day longer than was required to deprive him of his elected seat in the House of Commons.

Rose wrote to Speaker Gaspard Fauteux from St. Vincent de Paul Penitentiary on 24 January 1947:

Mr. Speaker: If the will of the people is to prevail, if justice is to be done, there can be no question of my expulsion from the house. To the contrary, I should be in my seat in the House of Commons and not in the penitentiary. Parliament is the highest of Courts. Through its actions in my case it will decide whether hysteria is to continue or whether reason and justice are to prevail. Respectfully, Fred Rose, M.P.

His letter was returned to him unread, and on 30 January 1947, he was formally expelled from the House of Commons.

== Later life ==
Rose was released from prison in 1951 after four-and-a-half years. Attempting to find work in Montreal, he was tailed from jobsite to jobsite by the Royal Canadian Mounted Police (RCMP), which pointed out to employers and workmates that he was a convicted spy.

In 1953 he went to Poland to attempt to set up an import-export business and to obtain health treatment that he could not afford in Canada. He worked for many years as English-language editor of Poland, a magazine of Polish culture and civilization designed for sale in the West. While he lived in Poland, his Canadian citizenship was revoked in 1957, and he was unable to return to Canada to lead the fight to clear his name.

His appeal against revoking his citizenship was denied, although Minister of Citizenship and Immigration Ellen Fairclough introduced the so-called "Fred Rose amendment" in 1958 to the Citizenship Act so that such a removal of Canadian citizenship could never happen again. Years later, former federal cabinet minister Allan MacEachen acknowledged that the pages of Prime Minister William Lyon Mackenzie King's diary dealing with Rose had gone missing, as had most of the other records dealing with his case.

Rose died on 16 March 1983 in Warsaw, having never returned to Canada.

== Electoral record ==
=== Federal ===
1935 Canadian federal election: Cartier
Party	Candidate	Votes	%
Liberal	Samuel William Jacobs	13,574	65.27
Communist	Fred Rosenberg (Rose)	3,385	16.28
Independent Liberal	Paul-Emile Goyette	1,531	7.36
Reconstruction	Salluste Lavery	1,362	6.55
Conservative	Herman Julien	945	4.54

Canadian federal by-election, August 9, 1943: Cartier Death of Peter Bercovitch
Party	Candidate	Votes	%	±%
Labor–Progressive	Fred Rose	5,789	30.42	–
Bloc populaire	Paul Masse	5,639	29.63	–
Liberal	Lazarus Phillips	4,180	21.97	–66.57
Co-operative Commonwealth	David Lewis	3,313	17.41	–
Independent	Moses Miller	109	0.57	–
Total valid votes		19,030	100.00	
Labor–Progressive gain from Liberal		Swing		–
Source: Library of Parliament

1945 Canadian federal election: Cartier
Party	Candidate	Votes	%	±%
Labor–Progressive	Fred Rose	10,413	40.84	+10.42
Liberal	Samuel Edgar Schwisberg	8,935	35.04	+13.07
Bloc populaire	Paul Masse	6,148	24.11	–5.52
Total valid votes		25,496	100.00	
Labor–Progressive hold		Swing		–1.32

=== Provincial ===
1936 Quebec general election: Montréal–Saint-Louis
Party	Candidate	Votes	%
Liberal	Peter Bercovitch	2,024	58.83
Union Nationale	Louis-Gédéon Gravel	773	22.47
Communist	Fred Rosenberg (Rose)	578	16.80
Independent Union Nationale	Éphrem-J. Cuerrier	65	1.88
