= Peter Bercovitch =

Canadian politician (1879–1942)

Member of Parliament for Cartier
- In office November 7, 1938 – December 26, 1942
- Preceded by: Samuel William Jacobs
- Succeeded by: Fred Rose

Member of the Legislative Assembly of Quebec for Montréal–Saint-Louis
- In office May 22, 1916 – October 4, 1938
- Preceded by: Godfroy Langlois
- Succeeded by: Louis Fitch

Personal details
- Born: September 17, 1879 Montreal, Quebec, Canada
- Died: December 26, 1942 (aged 63)
- Party: Liberal

Peter Bercovitch, KC (September 17, 1879 – December 26, 1942) was a Canadian provincial and federal politician.

Born in Montreal, Quebec, the son of Hyman Bercovitch and Fannie Goldberg, he received a Bachelor of Civil Law from McGill University and a Master of Laws from the Université de Montréal. He was called to the Quebec Bar in 1901 and was created a King's Counsel in 1911. He practised law in Montreal and became a senior partner of the law firm Bercovitch, Cohen and Spector.

He was elected to the Legislative Assembly of Quebec representing the riding of Montréal–Saint-Louis for the Liberal party in the 1916 Quebec election. He was re-elected in 1919 (by acclamation), 1923, 1927, 1931, 1935 (by acclamation), and 1936. He resigned in 1938 and was acclaimed to the House of Commons of Canada representing the riding of Cartier for the Liberal party in a 1938 by-election and was re-elected in the 1940 federal election. He died in office in late 1942.
