= Labor-Progressive Party =

Legal front of the Communist Party of Canada from 1943 to 1959

Labor-Progressive Party Parti ouvrier-progressiste
- Former federal party
- Abbreviation: LPP
- Leader: Tim Buck
- Founder: Tim Buck
- Founded: August 1943
- Dissolved: June 1959
- Preceded by: Communist Party of Canada
- Succeeded by: Communist Party of Canada
- Youth wing: National Federation of Labor Youth
- Ideology: Communism; Marxism–Leninism
- Political position: Far-left
- National affiliation: Communist Party of Canada
- Most MPs: 2 (1943—1945)

The Labor-Progressive Party (LPP; French: Parti ouvrier-progressiste) was the legal front of the Communist Party of Canada and its provincial wings from 1943 to 1959. It was established during World War II after a number of prominent Communist Party members were released from wartime internment, with Communist Party general secretary Tim Buck serving as the LPP's leader. The LPP elected one member of parliament during its history, trade unionist Fred Rose, who won the 1943 Cartier federal by-election in the Montreal riding. The party also saw provincial and municipal-level victories, particularly in Manitoba, Ontario, and Quebec.

== Origins and initial success ==
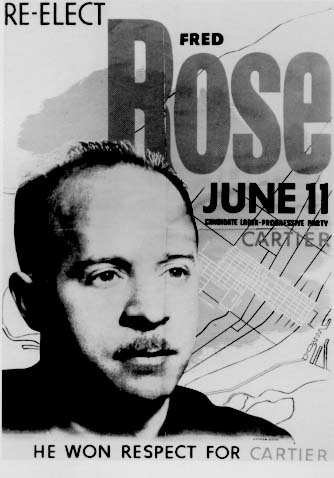
Fred Rose re-election poster (1945)

In the 1940 federal election, the Communist Party led a popular front in several constituencies in Saskatchewan and Alberta under the name Unity, United Progressive or United Reform and elected two MPs, one of whom, Dorise Nielsen, was secretly a member of the Communist Party.

After the Communist Party of Canada was banned in 1940, under the wartime Defence of Canada Regulations, it established the Labor-Progressive Party (LPP) as a front organization in 1943 after the release of Communist Party leaders from internment. Nielsen declared her affiliation to the LPP when it was founded in August 1943. She was defeated in the 1945 election when she ran for re-election as an LPP candidate.

Only one LPP Member of Parliament (MP) was elected to the House of Commons under that banner, Fred Rose, who was elected in a 1943 by-election in Montreal, sitting with Nielsen. Rose was re-elected in 1945. Rose was charged and convicted in 1946 for spying for the Soviet Union, and was expelled from the House of Commons in 1947.

The leader of the party was Tim Buck. Other prominent members were Margaret Fairley, Stewart Smith, Stanley Ryerson and Sam Carr.

While "labour" is generally spelled with a 'u' in Canadian English, and English in the former British Empire, the Labor-Progressive Party used the American spelling.

== Provincial campaigns ==
In Ontario, two LPP members, A. A. MacLeod and J. B. Salsberg, sat in the Legislative Assembly of Ontario from 1943 to 1951 and 1955 respectively. The LPP also jointly nominated several Liberal-Labour candidates with the Ontario Liberal Party. Alexander Parent, who was also president of UAW Local 195, was elected as the Liberal-Labour MPP for Essex North in 1945. In January 1946, he announced that he was breaking with the "reactionary" Liberals and sat the remainder of his term in the legislature as a Labour representative while voting with LPP MPPs MacLeod and Salsberg. He did not run for re-election in 1948.

The Manitoba party had amongst its leading members Jacob Penner who was a popular aldermen in Winnipeg, Manitoba, as well as Bill Kardash who was a Manitoba Member of the Legislative Assembly.

The party also ran candidates in Quebec general elections from 1944 to 1956 as the Parti ouvrier-progressiste.

== Municipal strength ==
The LPP had strong pockets of support in working-class neighbourhoods of Montreal, Toronto and Winnipeg as well as in the Crowsnest Pass mining region of Alberta and British Columbia. elected a number of its members to local city councils and school boards. In Winnipeg, Jacob Penner was a long-time member of the city council while Joe Zuken sat on the school board. In Toronto, Charles Simms and Norman Freed served as aldermen while Smith was elected to the city's powerful Board of Control.

From 1944 to 1947, Helen Anderson Coulson sat on Hamilton's City Council as an Alderman (from 1944–1946) and, after the 1946 municipal election, as a member of the city's highest decision making body, the Board of Control. She played a significant role in the Stelco Strike of 1946, and paid for her stances in the 1947 election, being shut out of the 4-person body after receiving the second highest number of votes in 1946. She would unsuccessfully seek election numerous times over the next decade, most prominently opposing Mayor Lloyd Jackson in 1950.

Harry Paikin was elected a school trustee on the Hamilton Board of Education in 1944 and remained in office for more than four decades, until his death in 1985.

== World War II ==
Following the Nazi invasion of the Soviet Union, the Canadian Communist Party reversed its earlier position urging Canadian neutrality in World War II.

After the vote the committees were renamed the Dominion Communist – Labour Total War Committee and were the main public face of the Communist Party, and became the main wartime activity of the Labor-Progressive Party, helping it raise its profile and encouraging the federal government to release Communist leaders who had been detained early in the war.

== Cold War ==
The LPP faced repression during the Cold War as anti-Communist sentiment increased in Canada. This was particularly acute after the revelations of Igor Gouzenko following his defection from the Soviet embassy in Ottawa. Gouzenko's revelations led to the downfall of Fred Rose. Nevertheless, the party continued to elect a handful of members to provincial legislatures, city councils and school boards across Canada into the 1950s.

== 1956–1957 crisis ==
An almost fatal blow for the party was the crisis that enveloped it following Nikita Khrushchev's Secret Speech to the Twentieth Party Congress of the Communist Party of the Soviet Union and the 1956 Soviet invasion of Hungary, the first event shattered the faith many LPP members had in the Soviet Union and Joseph Stalin while the second caused many to doubt that the USSR had truly changed. Aggravated as well by revelations of widespread antisemitism in the Soviet Union (a serious blow to Jewish members of the LPP such as Salsberg and Robert Laxer), the party underwent a serious split with more than half of its membership including many in the leadership, including Salsberg, Stewart Smith, Harry Binder, Sam Lipshitz and other prominent LPP leaders, ultimately leaving with the remaining party being a remnant of what it once had been. The United Jewish Peoples' Order, which had been one of the largest organizations allied with the LPP, broke with the party in December 1956 as a result of Salsberg's revelations after his fact-finding mission to the USSR to investigate reports of systemic antisemitism and repression of Jewish culture.

== Decline ==
The LPP last ran a federal candidate in a December 1958 by-election and ran nine candidates in the 1959 Ontario election. Shortly thereafter, it renamed itself the Communist Party of Canada once again.

The LPP had a youth wing, the National Federation of Labour Youth which had formerly been known as the Young Communist League. The NFLY was reorganized as the Socialist Youth League of Canada in 1957 following defections from the Communist movement.

== Federal election results ==
| Election | Leader | Candidates | Seats won | Votes | % | Rank |
|---|---|---|---|---|---|---|
| 1945 (Note: 1945 results compared to 1940 Communist Party of Canada result.) | Tim Buck | 68 / 245 | 1 / 245 | 111,892 | ▲2.13 | ▲6th |
| 1949 | Tim Buck | 17 / 262 | 0 / 262 | 32,623 | ▼0.56 | ▼8th |
| 1953 | Tim Buck | 100 / 265 | 0 / 265 | 59,622 | ▲1.06 | ▲7th |
| 1957 | Tim Buck | 10 / 265 | 0 / 265 | 7,760 | ▼0.12 | 7th |
| 1958 | Tim Buck | 18 / 265 | 0 / 265 | 9,769 | ▲0.13 | ▲6th |

== See also ==
- Labor-Progressive Party (Quebec)
- Association of United Ukrainian Canadians
- Federation of Russian Canadians
- United Jewish Peoples' Order
