= List of Jewish Canadian writers =

This is a list of key Jewish Canadian authors, with an article and critical history to follow.

== A ==
- Irving Abella (historian)
- Mona Elaine Adilman (poet)
- Ted Allan (novelist, poet, screenwriter, playwright)
- Barbara Amiel (journalist)
- Lisa Appignanesi (journalist and novelist)

== B ==
- Ben Barry (entrepreneur and author)
- Saul Bellow (Canadian-born American novelist)
- David Bezmozgis (novelist and short story writer)
- Monique Bosco (novelist, poet, journalist)

== C ==
- Leonard Cohen (poet, novelist, songwriter)
- Matt Cohen (novelist)

== D ==
- Cory Doctorow (science fiction writer)

== E ==
- Rebecca Eckler (journalist)
- Howard Engel (mystery novelist, memoirist)

== F ==
- Ken Finkleman (screenwriter)
- Diane Flacks (playwright)
- Golda Fried (novelist, poet)
- Martin Friedland (law writer)
- David Frum (journalist)
- Linda Frum (journalist)

== G ==
- Gabriella Goliger (novelist)
- Noam Gonick (screenwriter)
- Nora Gold (author, activist)
- Phyllis Gottlieb (novelist, poet)

== H ==
- Charles Yale Harrison (novelist, biographer)
- Elisa Hategan (memoirist)
- Anna Heilman (memoirist)
- Simma Holt (journalist and politician)
- David Homel (novelist, translator)
- Mel Hurtig (journalist and publisher)
- Zach Hyman (children's author)

== J ==
- George Jonas (journalist, poet and playwright)

== K ==
- Naïm Kattan (novelist and essayist)
- Joseph Kertes (novelist)
- A.M. Klein (poet, novelist, essayist)
- Naomi Klein (journalist)
- Rachel Korn (poet)
- Henry Kreisel (novelist)
- Aaron Kreuter (poet)

== L ==
- Steven Laffoley (novelist and creative nonfiction author)
- Michele Landsberg (journalist)
- Irving Layton (poet)
- Allan Levine (novelist)
- Norman Levine (short story writer)
- Dahlia Lithwick (journalist and editor)

== M ==
- Eli Mandel (poet)
- Stephen Marche (novelist)
- Malka Marom (novelist, documentarian)
- Michael Marrus (historian)
- Seymour Mayne (poet)
- Ida Maze (poet)
- Judith Merril (novelist, editor)
- Anne Michaels (poet, novelist)
- Sean Michaels (novelist, critic)
- Hannah Moscovitch (playwright)

== N ==
- Jay Newman (philosopher and academic)
- M. J. Nurenberger (journalist)

== P ==
- Gunther Plaut (theologian, novelist, historian, journalist)

== R ==
- David Rakoff (humorist)
- Edeet Ravel (novelist)
- Melech Ravitch (poet, essayist)
- Judy Rebick (journalist)
- Abraham Rhinewine (journalist)
- Daniel Richler (novelist)
- Emma Richler (novelist)
- Mordecai Richler (novelist, essayist, film and television scenarist)
- Nancy Richler (novelist)
- Régine Robin (novelist, short story writer)
- Ellen Roseman (journalist, essayist, author)
- Claire Rothman (novelist, short story writer, translator)
- Chava Rosenfarb (novelist, poet, playwright)
- Stuart Ross (poet, short story writer, essayist)
- Robert Rotenberg (novelist)

== S ==
- Shelly Sanders (novelist, journalist, essayist)
- Esther Segal (poet)
- J. I. Segal (poet, editor)
- Mark Shainblum (short story writer, comic book writer)
- Lionel Shapiro (novelist, journalist)
- Jason Sherman (playwright)
- Joseph Sherman (poet)
- Kenneth Sherman (poet)
- Sholem Shtern (poet, novelist)

== T ==
- Ellie Tesher (journalist)
- Morley Torgov (novelist)
- Ayelet Tsabari (short story writer, memoirist)
- Aren X. Tulchinsky (novelist)

== W ==
- Miriam Waddington (poet)
- Michael Wex (novelist and playwright)
- Adele Wiseman (novelist)
- Hirsch Wolofsky (memoirist and journalist)

== Y ==
- Avrom Yanofsky (comic book writer and artist, journalist)
- Joel Yanofsky (novelist, memoirist, journalist)
- Yudika (poet)

== Z ==
- Larry Zolf (journalist)
- Syd Zolf (poet)

== See also ==
- Lists of Canadian writers
