= Lyon Cohen =

Polish-born Canadian businessman and philanthropist

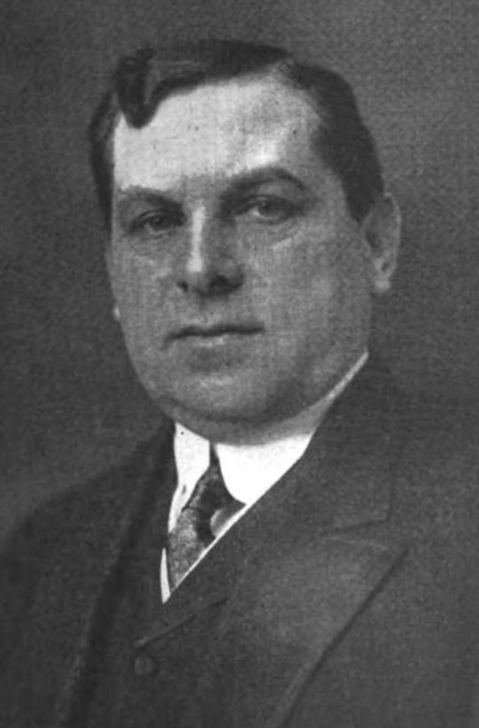
- Born: Yehuda Leib Cohen; May 11, 1868; Suwałki, Suwałki Governorate, Congress Poland
- Died: August 17, 1937 (aged 69); Old Orchard Beach, Maine, U.S.
- Known for: first president of the Canadian Jewish Congress, co-founder of the Canadian Jewish Times
- Spouse: Rachel Friedman
- Children: Nathan Bernard Cohen; Horace Rives Cohen; Lawrence Zebulun Cohen; Sylvia Lillian Cohen
- Relatives: Leonard Cohen (grandson); Adam Cohen (great-grandson)

Lyon Cohen (born Yehuda Leib Cohen; May 11, 1868 – August 17, 1937) was a Polish-born Canadian businessman and a philanthropist. He was the grandfather of singer/poet Leonard Cohen.

== Biography ==
Cohen was born in Congress Poland, part of the Russian Empire, to a Jewish family on May 11, 1868. He immigrated to Canada with his parents in 1871. He was educated at the McGill Model School and the Catholic Commercial Academy in Montreal. In 1888, he entered the firm of Lee & Cohen in Montreal; later became partner with his father in the firm of L. Cohen & Son; in 1895, he established W. R. Cuthbert & Co; in 1900, he organized the Canadian Improvement Co., a dredging contractor; in 1906, he founded The Freedman Co. in Montreal; and in May 1919, he organized and became President of Canadian Export Clothiers, Ltd. The Freedman Company went on to become one of Montreal’s largest clothing companies.

In 1897, Cohen and Samuel William Jacobs founded the Canadian Jewish Times, the first English-language Jewish newspaper in Canada. The newspaper promoted the Canadianization of recent East European Jewish immigrants and encouraged their acceptance of Canadian customs as Cohen felt that the Old World customs of immigrant Jews were one of the main causes of anti-Semitism. In 1914, the paper was purchased by Hirsch Wolofsky, owner of the Yiddish-language Keneder Adler, who transformed it into the Canadian Jewish Chronicle.

He died on August 17, 1937, at the age of 69.

== Philanthropy ==
Cohen was elected the first president of the Canadian Jewish Congress in 1919 and organized the Jewish Immigrant Aid Services of Canada. Cohen was also a leader of the Young Men’s Hebrew Benevolent Society (later the Baron de Hirsch Institute) and the United Talmud Torahs, a Jewish day school in Montreal. He also served as president of Congregation Shaar Hashomayim and president of the Jewish Colonization Association in Canada.

== Personal life ==
Cohen married Rachel Friedman of Montreal on February 17, 1891. She was the founder and President of Jewish Endeavour Sewing School. They had three sons and one daughter:

- Nathan Bernard Cohen, who served as a lieutenant in the First World War; he married Lithuanian Jewish immigrant Masha Klonitsky and they had one daughter and one son:
  - Esther Cohen and
  - singer/poet Leonard Cohen.
- Horace Rives Cohen, who was a captain and quartermaster of his battalion in World War I;
- Lawrence Zebulun Cohen, student at McGill University, and
- Sylvia Lillian Cohen.

Preceded by none	President of the Canadian Jewish Congress; 1919-1934	Succeeded by Samuel William Jacobs
