= Michael Garber =

Personal life
- Born: May 10, 1892
- Died: January 20, 1977 (aged 84)
- Buried: Shaar Hashomayim Cemetery
- Spouse: Isabel Yohalem (died 1971)

Religious life
- Religion: Judaism

Jewish leader
- Predecessor: Samuel Bronfman
- Successor: Monroe Abbey
- Position: President
- Organisation: Canadian Jewish Congress
- Began: 1962
- Ended: 1968

Michael Garber QC (May 10, 1892 – January 20, 1977) was a Montreal-based lawyer and a Canadian Jewish community activist. He was a founder of the Canadian Jewish Congress, and succeeded Samuel Bronfman as president for two terms, from 1962 to 1968, after having chaired its national executive for a number of years. He was also a president of the Zionist Organization of Canada, wrote a column for the Canadian Jewish Chronicle, and contributed to the Yiddish newspaper Der Keneder Adler.

Preceded by Samuel Bronfman	President of the Canadian Jewish Congress; 1962–1968	Succeeded by Monroe Abbey
