= Ida Maze =

Canadian poet

- אײַדע מאַזע
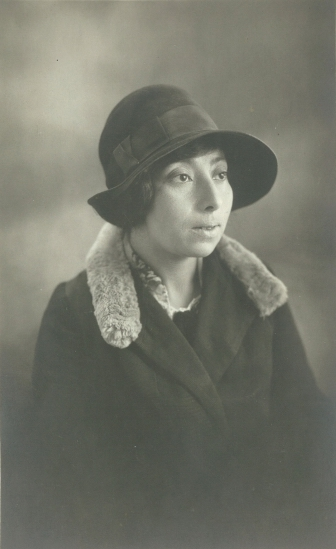
- Ida Maze, 1930s
- Born: Ida Zhukovsky; July 9, 1893; Ugli, Belarus, Russian Empire
- Died: June 13, 1962 (aged 68); Montreal, Quebec, Canada
- Spouse: Alexander Massey (m. 1912; died 1961)
- Writing career
- Language: Yiddish

Ida Maze (Yiddish: אײַדע מאַזע, Aydeh Mazeh) (9 July 1893 – 13 June 1962), also known as Ida Maza and Ida Massey, was a Canadian Yiddish-language poet. Her home in Montreal became a literary salon and she became a maternal figure to Canadian Yiddish language authors.

== Biography ==
=== Early life ===
Maze was born Ida Zhukovsky in Ugli (or Ogli), a village south of Minsk in Tsarist Belarus, one of seven children of Shimon Zukofsky, an innkeeper, and Musha Govezniansky. She was also related to Yiddish author Mendele Mocher Sforim. She had about a year of cheder education but was otherwise self-taught. At the age of fourteen, she, her parents, and one sister emigrated to New York and settled in Montreal the following year. In 1912, she married Alexander Massey (born Ellie-Gershon Maze, c. 1893–1961), a travelling salesman of men's clothing accessories and relative of Zionist leader Jacob Maze. They had three sons, Bernard (c. 1913–1923), Israel (1918–1962) and Irving Massey (b. 1924).

=== Career ===
She began to write in 1928 in reaction to the death of her eldest son Bernard and these poems made up her first collection, A Mame (אַ מאַמע, 'A Mother', 1931). Most of her work would be about or for children. She went on to publish Lider far kinder (לידער פֿאַר קינדער, 'Songs for Children', 1936), Naye lider (נײַע לידער, 'New Songs', 1941), and Vaksn mayne kinderlech (וואַקסן מײַנע קינדערלעך, 'My Children Grow', 1954). A novel based on her childhood memories, Dineh: Autobiografishe dertseylung (דינה: אויטאָביאָגראַפֿישע דערציילונג, 'Dina: An Autobiographical Story', 1970), was published posthumously. She published poems in a number of journals and anthologies, including Yidish amerike ('Yiddish America', edited by Noah Steinberg, 1929) and The Golden Peacock (edited by Joseph Leftwich, 1939). She also co-edited the journal Heftn from 1935 to 1937.

Maze became the leader of a literary salon where Yiddish writers, poets and artists would gather and share their work: including writers N. Y. Gottlib, A. Sh. Shkolnikov, Shabse Perl, Moyshe Shaffir, Mirl Erdberg-Shatan, Esther Segal, J. I. Segal, Yudika, and Kadia Molodowsky, the painter Louis Muhlstock, and, in the 1940s and beyond, Melech Ravitch, Rokhl Korn and other refugees and survivors from Nazi Europe.

Maze was at the center of Montreal's Yiddish language artistic community, both through the salon at her home and through reading groups and other programs she ran at the Jewish Public Library. She assisted others in the Jewish community with their literary work, finding employment, or arranging visas and permits. One of those writers she assisted was a teenage Miriam Waddington, who later recalled, "She gave herself entirely and attentively to the poem; she fed the spiritual hunger and yearning of these oddly assorted Yiddish writers whenever they needed her."
