= Mark Freiman =

Canadian attorney and public servant

President of the Canadian Jewish Congress
- In office 2009–2011
- Preceded by: Reuven Bulka; Sylvain Abitbol
- Succeeded by: Position abolished

Personal details
- Education: University of Toronto (BA, JD); Stanford University (PhD)

Mark Freiman is a Canadian attorney and public servant who served as president of the Canadian Jewish Congress from 2009 to 2011.

== Education ==
Freiman earned his Bachelor of Arts degree from the University of Toronto in 1969 and a PhD from Stanford University in 1977. He graduated from the University of Toronto Faculty of Law in 1983 and was called to the bar in 1985.

== Career ==
He served as Lead Commission Counsel for the Air India Inquiry under Justice John Major. In 2010, he joined Lerners LLP's partnership after having been a partner in the Toronto law firm McCarthy Tétrault. Previously, he has taught at the University of Toronto and served as Deputy Attorney General of Ontario from 2000 to 2004 and Deputy Minister of Indigenous Affairs.

He served as law clerk to then Supreme Court of Canada Chief Justice Brian Dickson and as senior policy advisor to then Attorney General of Ontario Ian Scott.

He was elected president of the Canadian Jewish Congress in 2009 and served until the organization's dissolution in 2011.

Freiman has become an advocate for better preservation of a Ukrainian Holocaust memorial site where over 1,200 Jews were shot and buried in 1943.

== Sources ==
- Official biography

Preceded by Reuven Bulka and Sylvain Abitbol	President of the Canadian Jewish Congress; 2009-2011	Succeeded by none
