= Dattani =

Dattani is a surname. Notable people with the surname include:

- Birju Dattani, Canadian lawyer
- Mahesh Dattani (born 1958), Indian director, actor, playwright, and writer
- Naomi Dattani (born 1994), English cricketer
- Sameer Dattani (born 1982), Indian actor
