= Ed Morgan (professor) =

Canadian jurist (born 1955)

- Born: January 3, 1955 (age 71); Philadelphia, Pennsylvania, U.S.
- Education: Northwestern University (BA); University of Toronto (LLB); Harvard University (LLM)
- Employer: University of Toronto
- Notable work: The Aesthetics of International Law (U. Toronto Press, 2007)

Edward M. Morgan (born January 3, 1955) is a Canadian jurist. He was a lawyer in private practice and taught international law at the University of Toronto until he was appointed as a trial judge of the Ontario Superior Court of Justice in 2012.

== Early life and education ==
Edward M. Morgan was born on January 3, 1955, in Philadelphia, Pennsylvania. He attended Northwestern University (B.A., 1976), the University of Toronto (LL.B., 1984), and Harvard Law School (LL.M., 1986).

== Career ==
He was a law clerk to Justice Bertha Wilson of the Supreme Court of Canada in 1984–85.

Morgan taught public international law, private international law, and international criminal law.

He started teaching in 1986, and from 1989 to 1997 practised at Davies, Ward & Beck in Toronto.

Ed Morgan has been acclaimed as the president of Canadian Jewish Congress, CJC, in 2004. Morgan, who becomes the CJC's 17th national president, has been serving as chair of CJC's Ontario region.

== Views ==
In July 2008, he commented on a lawsuit wherein a Canadian firm had contracted to build apartments in Modi'in Illit was being accused of violating international law, which states that permanent settlements is not permitted in occupied territories. He said there while the move was "imaginative", there were obstacles in the case that might prevent it from prevailing. For example, the Geneva Convention was intended to apply to countries, and not to companies.

In December 2008, commenting on a suggested House of Commons committee review of the position of governor general, he noted that it would require amending Canada's Constitution. He said: "In Canada, the idea of tinkering with the Constitution is a tinderbox. It would have to be a really strong public sentiment to start the process for a constitutional amendment."

Commenting in September 2009 on efforts by Canadian tax officials to press Swiss bank UBS for details of Canadians who might be using UBS accounts to evade taxes, he said "They can go to court to try to compel UBS to disgorge names of Canadian taxpayers that have accounts there, but I'd say it's a toss-up as to whether they'd get that court order. It remains to be seen whether the courts think that banks are obliged to give up information about taxpayers that the taxpayers won't, on our voluntary disclosure system, give up."

When in February 2010 Toronto school trustee Josh Matlow refused to apologize for criticizing the school board's decision to spend $345,000 on a one-day professional development conference, he said: "I think Matlow is doing exactly what we want school trustees to do. He's speaking his mind and speaking in criticism of board decisions. That's why we elect independent thinkers."

== Select works ==
=== Books ===
- The Aesthetics of International Law (U. Toronto Press, 2007)
- International law and the Canadian courts: sovereign immunity, criminal jurisdiction, aliens' rights, and taxation powers (Carswell, 1990)

=== Editor ===
- Canadian Journal of Law and Jurisprudence, 2002, guest editor of special issue on international law theory
- Canadian Yearbook of International Law, member of the Board of Editors, 1997–present

=== Articles ===
- "Traffic Circles: The Legal Logic of Drug Extraditions", University of Pennsylvania Journal of International Law (forthcoming).
- "The Law of Betrayal in the Wild West Bank", 1 Journal of International Law and International Relations 345 (2005).
- "Slaughterhouse-Six: Updating the Law of War", 5 German Law Journal 525 (2004).
- "The Other Death of International Law", 14 Leiden Journal of International Law 3 (2001).
- "An International Legal Perspective on Resolution 242", United Nations Security Council Resolution 242: A 25 Year Retrospective 12 (1992).
- "The Hermaphroditic Paradigm of International Law, State Sovereignty: The Challenge of a Changing World", 78 Canadian Council on International Law (1992).
- "Aliens and Process Rights: The Open and Shut Case of Legal Sovereignty", 7 Wisconsin International Law Journal 107 (1989).
- "International Law in a Post-Modern Hall of Mirrors", 26 Osgoode Hall Law Journal 209 (1988).
- "Internalization of Customary International Law: An Historical Perspective", 12 Yale Journal of International Law.

== Select constitutional and international law cases ==
- Islamic Sunni Verra Community v. Navlakhi, representing board of Toronto-based mosque
- Wheeler v. China National Petroleum Co., representing Chinese national oil company in Alberta in jurisdictional challenges to class action
- Flato v. Islamic Republic of Iran, expert witness for plaintiff attaching foreign state's bank account in Italian Corte di Cassazione
- Ungar v. Palestinian Authority, expert witness in U.S. District Court on status of the Palestinian Authority under international law
- Minister of Citizenship v. Overlander, counsel for intervener group supporting war crimes prosecution

Preceded by Keith M. Landy	President of the Canadian Jewish Congress; 2004-2007	Succeeded by Reuven Bulka and Sylvain Abitbol
