= Roback =

Roback is a surname. Notable people with the surname include:

- Abraham Aaron Roback (1890–1965), Jewish American psychologist and promoter of Yiddish
- Brogan Roback (born 1994), American football quarterback
- Charles W. Roback (1811–1867), Swedish fraudster, Swedish-American patent medicine manufacturer, astrologist and charlatan
- David Roback (1958–2020), American guitarist and songwriter
- Emil Roback (born 2003), Swedish football player
- Léa Roback (1903–2000), Canadian trade union organizer, social activist, pacifist, and feminist
- Jennifer Roback Morse (born 1953), American economist, writer and Catholic social conservative

== See also ==
- Röbäck, a locality in Sweden
