= Hershell Ezrin =

Hershell Ezrin OOnt (born 1947) a Canadian executive who was the founding chief executive officer of the Canadian Council for Israel and Jewish Advocacy, a national lobby group which funds the Canadian Jewish Congress and is linked with the United Jewish Appeal across Canada. He retired from CIJA in 2010. He is currently managing director of Ezrin Communications, and a Distinguished Visiting Scholar at Ryerson University's Ted Rogers School of Management for the 2013–14 school year.

In his earlier career as a public servant, Ezrin served as Canadian consul in New York City and Los Angeles. Subsequently, he served in the Privy Council Office under Prime Minister Pierre Trudeau. In 1982, he left the federal government to work for the Ontario Liberal Party and subsequently served as Deputy Minister and Principal Secretary to Ontario Premier David Peterson.

Ezrin was subsequently chairman and chief executive officer of GPC International.

Ezrin was educated at the University of Toronto and Carleton University earning bachelor's and master's degrees in history. His wife's uncle was Ontario politician and trade unionist J.B. Salsberg.

== Sources ==
- About Hershell Ezrin
- Bios
- Head of New Canadian Council To Organize Grassroots Efforts
