= Shimon Fogel =

Canadian lobbyist

Shimon Koffler Fogel is the former Chief Executive Officer of the Centre for Israel and Jewish Affairs (CIJA), formerly the Canadian Council for Israel and Jewish Advocacy. He served in the position from January 1, 2011, to December 9, 2024, as part of an impending restructuring of Jewish agencies in Canada that resulted in the Canadian Jewish Congress, the Canada-Israel Committee and other bodies dissolving on July 1, 2011, with their functions being assumed by CIJA. Prior to becoming CEO of CIJA, Fogel was CEO of the Canada-Israel Committee from 1988 until 2010.

== Education ==
Fogel is a graduate of Clark University’s School of Government and International Relations where he was awarded a Jonas Clark Scholarship. He pursued graduate and doctoral studies at McGill University.

== Career ==
Fogel served as the first National Director of Community Services at Canadian Jewish Congress and as Executive Director of the Atlantic Jewish Council until 1988 when he was appointed Chief Executive Officer of the Canada-Israel Committee.

He is a registered consultant to the Standing Committee on Foreign Affairs of the House of Commons of Canada, and has been a member of the Round-Table on Global Security under the Department of National Defence. He has also been a seasonal lecturer at Queen's University.

The parliamentary newspaper The Hill Times listed Fogel as one of the 100 most influential figures in Canada's political sector. Embassy Magazine also included Fogel on its list of the 50 most important people influencing Canadian foreign policy.

== Personal life ==
Fogel is fluent in English, French, Hebrew, and Yiddish. The son of Holocaust survivors, Fogel was raised in Montreal and currently lives in Ottawa. He is married with two children.
