= Reuven Bulka =

Canadian writer and rabbi (1944–2021)

Rabbi Dr. Reuven Bulka CM

Personal life
- Born: June 6, 1944 London, England, U.K.
- Died: June 27, 2021 (aged 77) New York, U.S.
- Spouse: Naomi Jakobovits (m. 1967; died 2001) Leah Kalish née Rosenbloom (m. 2002)
- Education: City College of New York; University of Ottawa

Religious life
- Religion: Judaism
- Denomination: Modern Orthodox Judaism

Jewish leader
- Synagogue: Machzikei Hadas
- Organisation: Canadian Jewish Congress
- Began: 2007
- Ended: 2009
- Semikhah: Rabbi Jacob Joseph School

Reuven Pinchas Bulka CM (Hebrew: ראובן פנחס בולקא; June 6, 1944 – June 27, 2021) was a Canadian rabbi, writer, broadcaster, and activist. He was the spiritual leader of Congregation Machzikei Hadas in Ottawa from 1967, first as Rabbi and then, starting in 2015, as Rabbi Emeritus. He served as co-president of the Canadian Jewish Congress from 2007 to 2009. Bulka's work with Kind Canada led to the recognition of the third week of February every year as "Kindness Week" in Canada.

== Biography ==
Bulka was born to Rabbi Chaim Yaakov "Jacob" and Yehudis "Ida" (Alt) Bulka in London on D-Day, June 6, 1944. The family moved to the United States in 1946, where his father taught at Hebrew schools in Providence and Rockaway before becoming rabbi of a synagogue in The Bronx.

He received his rabbinic ordination from the Rabbi Jacob Joseph Rabbinical Seminary in 1965 and was granted a Bachelor of Arts degree in Philosophy from the City College of the City University of New York the same year. He briefly served as Associate Rabbi at Congregation K’hal Adas Yeshurn in The Bronx, before becoming Rabbi of Congregation Machzikei Hadas in Ottawa in 1967. He received M.A. and Ph.D. degrees from the University of Ottawa in 1969 and 1971 respectively, concentrating on the logotherapy of Viktor Frankl.

In January 2021, Rabbi Bulka announced he had been diagnosed with late stage cancer of the liver and pancreas, and would travel to New York to be closer to his family who resided in and around New York City. He died on June 27, 2021, at the age of 77. He was buried in Israel.

== Work ==
=== Writing and broadcasting ===
Rabbi Bulka was the founder and editor of the Journal of Psychology and Judaism. He contributed scholarly and popular articles to various journals, including the Association of Mental Health Clergy Forum, Analecta Frankliana, Chronicle Review, Humanitas, Journal of Ecumenical Studies, Journal of Halacha and Contemporary Society, Journal of Humanistic Psychology, Midstream and Pastoral Psychology, among others. Bulka was the author and/or editor of over 35 books.

He was also the host of the TV series, In Good Faith and hosted the weekly radio call-in program Sunday Night with Rabbi Bulka on CFRA in Ottawa, and was the host of the weekly radio Jewish culture and music program JEW-BILATION on CJLL-FM. He was a regular columnist for the Ottawa Citizen's "Ask the Religion Experts" feature.

Rabbi Bulka regularly appeared during nationally televised Remembrance Day ceremonies at the National War Memorial Cenotaph in Ottawa.

=== Organizations ===
He was on the editorial boards of Tradition, SASSON Magazine, Journal of Religion and Health, International Forum for Logotherapy and Pastoral Psychology. Among other leadership roles, he served as Chairman of the RCA Publications Committee, the Ottawa World Jewry Committee (formerly Ottawa Soviet Jewry Committee), Israel Bonds's Rabbinic Cabinet, the Canadian Christian-Jewish Consultation, Ottawa Kindness Week, and the Trillium Gift of Life Network, President of the International Rabbinic Forum of Keren Hayesod, founder of Clergy for a United Canada, and Honorary Chaplain of the Dominion Command of the Royal Canadian Legion. He was a member of the Interfaith Committee on Canadian Military Chaplaincy and was instrumental in restoring Jewish Chaplains to the Canadian Forces. As a part of this Committee he received a Command Commendation from the Chief of Military Personnel. He was a member of the board of Canadian Blood Services and chaired the Hospice Ottawa West campaign. Previously he chaired the Courage Campaign for the Ottawa Regional Cancer Foundation which raised $25 million for cancer care.

Bulka's work with Kind Canada led to the federal government designating the third week of February every year as "Kindness Week" with the adoption of Bill S-223 during the 43rd Canadian Parliament.

As co-President of the Canadian Jewish Congress, Bulka called on the leadership of the Catholic Church in Canada to follow the lead of bishops in France, Belgium and Germany, among other countries, in denouncing the Holocaust denial and anti-Semitism of Bishop Richard Williamson and in reaffirming in no uncertain terms that such hateful views have no place in the Church.

== Awards and honours ==
Bulka was a recipient of the 125th Anniversary of the Confederation of Canada Medal (January 1993) as well as the Beryl Plumptre Award of Excellence from the Kidney Foundation of Canada, Eastern Ontario Branch (1998). He was also awarded the Gilbert Greenberg Distinguished Service Award of the Ottawa Jewish Community (1999), the Mayor's Award for Community Service (1999), the Bronfman Medal from the Canadian Jewish Congress. He was named the honorary principal of SAR Academy in Riverdale, New York, in February 2009.

In 2006 Bulka was awarded an honorary Doctorate of Laws from Carleton University, and on February 18, 2010, he was awarded the Key to the City of Ottawa. He also received Queen Elizabeth II's Silver Jubilee Medal, Golden Jubilee Medal, and Diamond Jubilee Medal. He was appointed to the Order of Canada on June 28, 2013.

He was awarded the Canadian Forces Medallion for Distinguished Service for "inspiring sermons, venerable presence and meaningful messages to Canadians during the National Remembrance Day ceremonies from the steps of the National War Memorial, Ottawa, Ontario, over many years."

== Partial bibliography ==
- Bulka, Reuven (1974). The Wit and Wisdom of the Talmud. New York: Peter Pauper Press.
- — (1979). Sex and the Talmud: Reflections on Human Relations. New York: Peter Pauper Press.
- — (1979). The Quest for Ultimate Meaning: Principles and Applications of Logotherapy. New York: Philosophical Library.
- — (1980). As a Tree by the Waters—Pirkey Avoth: Psychological and Philosophical Insights. New York: Feldheim. Translated in Russian (Daat, Moscow-Jerusalem, 2001).
- — (1983). Torah Therapy: Reflections on the Weekly Sedra and Special Occasions. Hoboken, N.J.: Ktav Publishing.
- — (1984). The Coming Cataclysm: The Orthodox-Reform Rift and the Future of the Jewish People. Oakville, Ontario: Mosaic Press.
- — (1985). The Haggadah for Pesah, with Translation and Thematic Commentary. Jerusalem: Pri Haaretz Publications.
- — (1986). Jewish Marriage: A Halakhic Ethic. Hoboken, N.J.: Ktav Publishing. ISBN 9780881250770.
- — (1987). The Jewish Pleasure Principle. New York: Human Sciences Press.
- — (1989). Individual, Family, Community: Judeo-Psychological Perspectives. Oakville, Ontario: Mosaic Press.
- — (1989). What You Thought You Knew About Judaism: 341 Common Misconceptions about Jewish Life. Northvale, N.J.: Jason Aronson.
- — (1990). Uncommon Sense for Common Problems. Toronto: Lugus Productions.
- — (1992). Jewish Divorce Ethics: The Right Way to Say Goodbye. Ogdensburg, N.Y.: Ivy League Press.
- — (1992). Critical Psychological Issues: Judaic Perspectives. Lanham, MD: University Press of America. ISBN 9780819184771.
- — (1992). Pesach: Its Meaning and Purpose, Publications Committee. New York: Rabbinical Council of America.
- — (1993). More of What You Thought You Knew About Judaism: 354 Common Misconceptions about Jewish Life. Northvale, N.J.: Jason Aronson.
- — (1993). More Torah Therapy: Further Reflections on the Weekly Sidrah and Special Occasions. Hoboken, N.J.: Ktav Publishing. ISBN 9780881254648.
- — (1995). One Man, One Woman, One Lifetime: An Argument for Moral Tradition. Lafayette, LA: Huntington House.
- — (1995). Sermonic Wit. Jerusalem: Keren HaYesod.
- — (1997). Tefilah v'Tikvah: Prayer and Hope. Hoboken, N.J.: Ktav Publishing.
- — (1998). Judaism on Illness and Suffering. Northvale, N.J.: Jason Aronson.
- — (2000). Answers to Questions of the Spirit. Ottawa: Ottawa Citizen.
- — (2002). More Answers to Questions of the Spirit. Oakville, Ontario: Mosaic Press.
- — (2002). Best-Kept Secrets of Judaism. Southfield, MI: Targum Press.
- — (2003). Modern Folk Judaism: The Problem and the Challenge. Hoboken, N.J.: Ktav Publishing. ISBN 9780881257830.

Preceded by Ed Morgan	Co-President of the Canadian Jewish Congress; 2007–2009; With: Sylvain Abitbol	Succeeded by Mark Freiman
