= Congregation Shaar Hashomayim =

Ashkenazi Orthodox synagogue in Montreal

- קהילת שער השמים
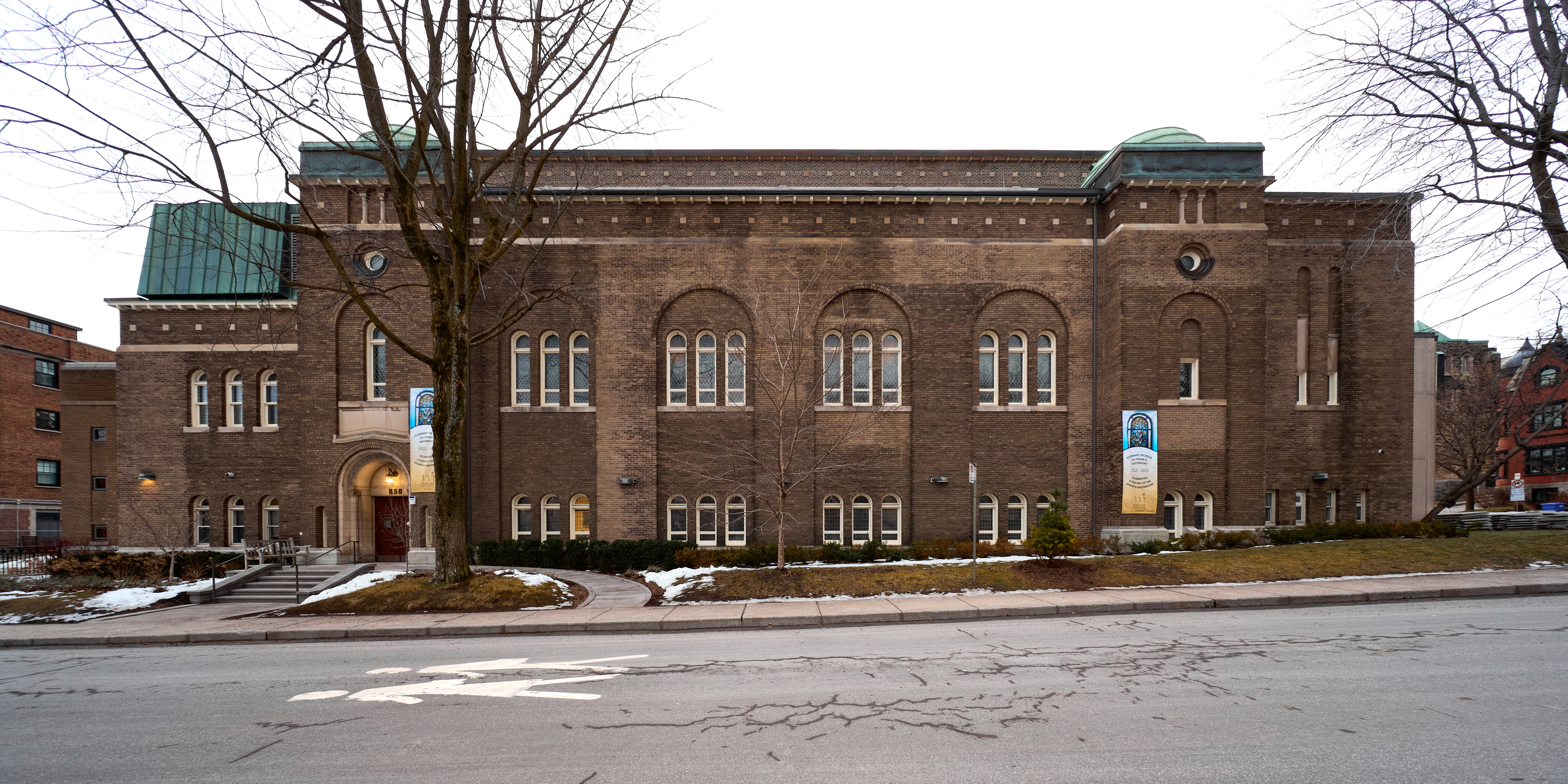
- The synagogue in 2023

Religion
- Affiliation: Traditional Judaism
- Rite: Ashkenazi
- Leadership: Rabbi Adam Scheier, Rabbi Yehoshua Ellis, Asst Rabbi, Cantor Gideon Zelermyer,
- Status: Active

Location
- Location: 450 Kensington Avenue; Westmount, Quebec, Canada
- Interactive map of Congregation Shaar Hashomayim
- Coordinates: 45.4849°N 73.5982°W

Architecture
- Established: 1846; 180 years ago
- Completed: September 17, 1922
- Capacity: 1,800 (main sanctuary), 260 (chapel)

Website
- shaarhashomayim.org

Congregation Shaar Hashomayim (Hebrew: קְהִילַת שַׁעַר הַשָּׁמָיִם) is an Ashkenazi synagogue in Westmount, Quebec. Incorporated in 1846, it is the oldest Ashkenazi synagogue in Canada and the largest traditional synagogue in Canada.

== History ==
Congregation Shaar Hashomayim was founded by a group of English, German and Polish Jews, who had previously attended the Spanish and Portuguese Synagogue. The Congregation originally rented space on Saint James Street (now Rue Saint-Jacques). The first synagogue was built on Saint Constant Street (now Rue de Bullion) in the Faubourg Saint-Laurent in 1859. A new synagogue was built on McGill College Avenue between 1885 and 1886 at a cost of $40,000.

In 1920, the Congregation purchased land on Kensington Avenue in Westmount. The cornerstone was laid by president Lyon Cohen in 1921, and the synagogue was dedicated on September 17, 1922. Herman Abramowitz served as rabbi from 1902 to 1947 and he was joined by rabbi Arthur Saul Super between 1933 and 1936. Wilfred Shuchat then served as rabbi from 1948 to 1993.

In 2013, Shaar Hashomayim became one of the first synagogues in North America to hire a female Orthodox clergy member, known as a Rabba. They hired Rabba Rachel Kohl Finegold who left for Deerfield, IL in 2023.

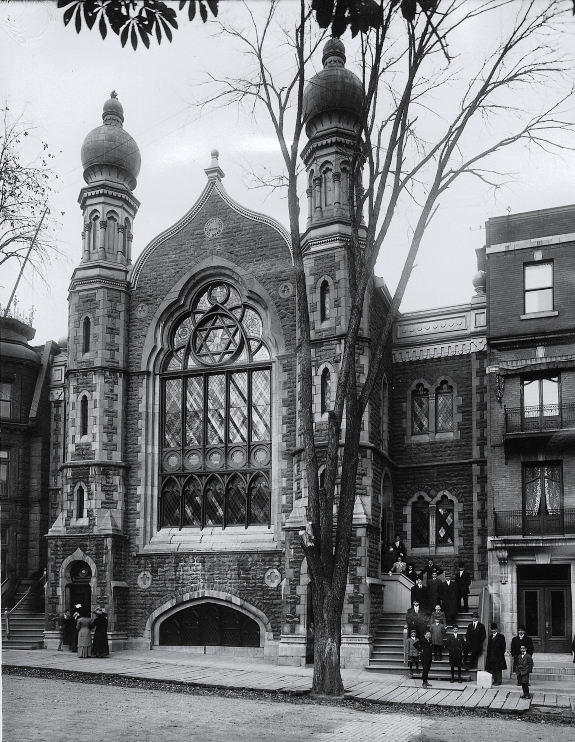
Former building of Shaar Hashomayim on McGill College Avenue

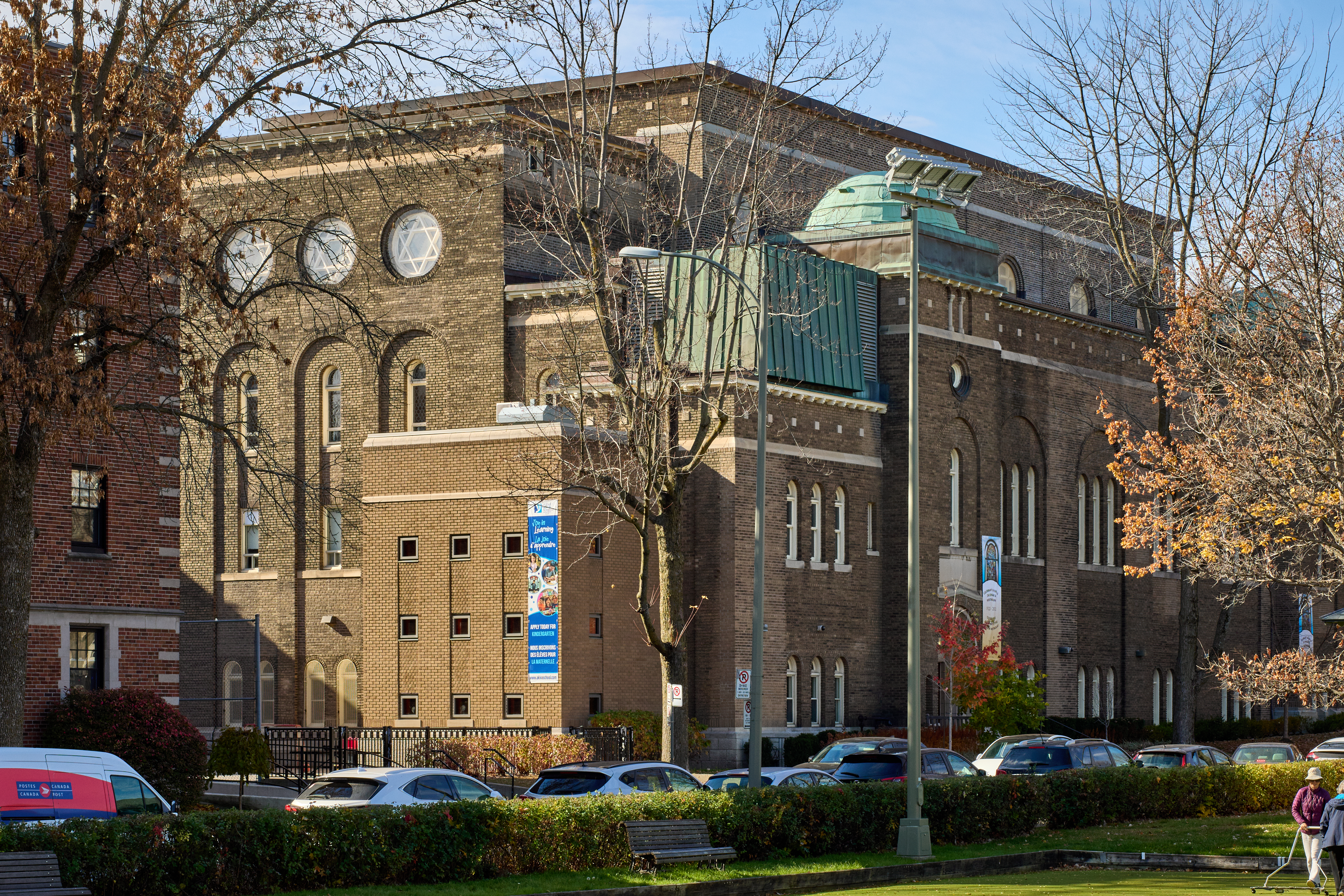
View of the synagogue from Sherbrooke Street

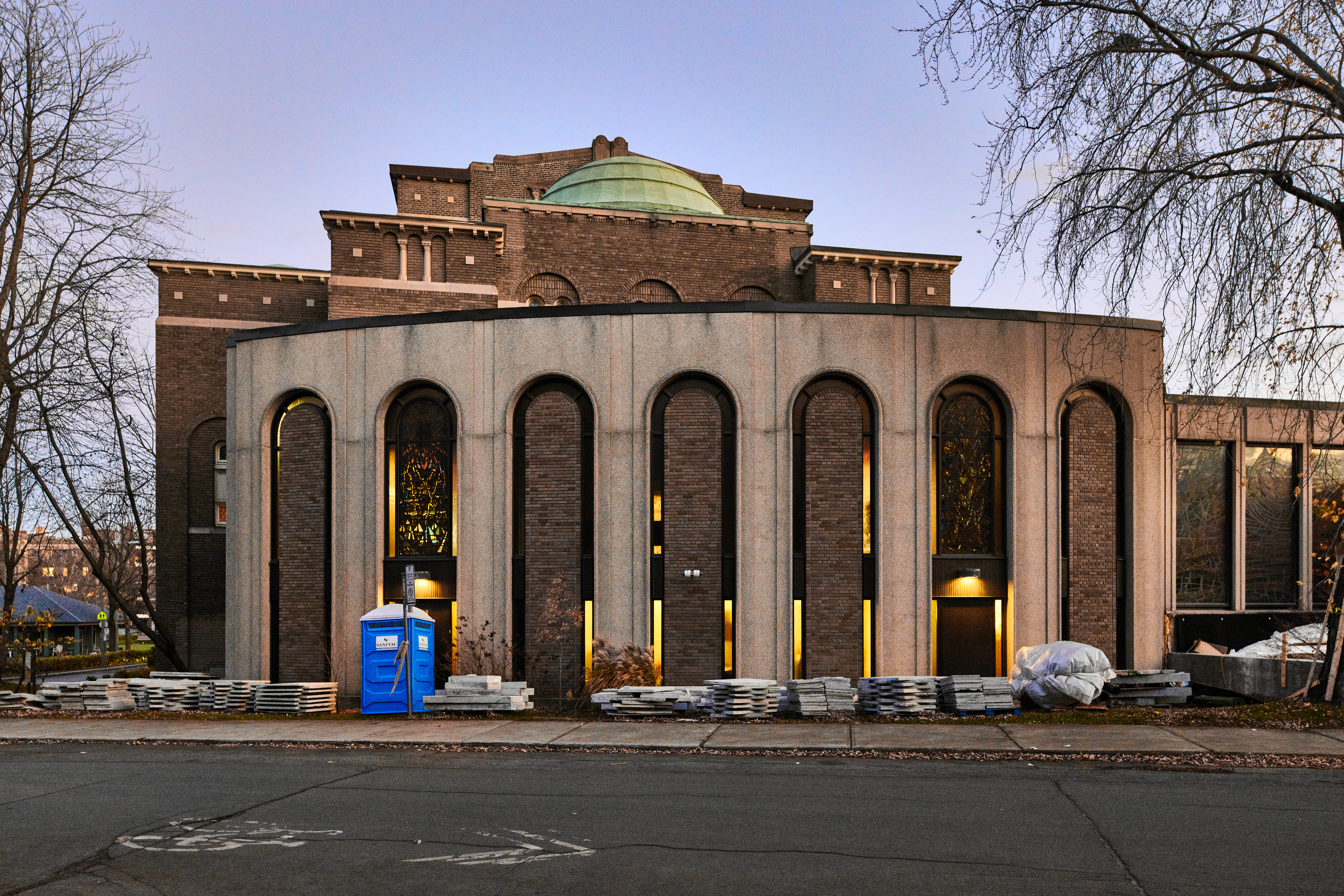
View of the synagogue from the top of the hill

== Traditions ==
Shaar Hashomayim is one of the few remaining synagogues in the world to maintain, on a weekly basis, the traditions of the choral synagogues of Europe. The early by-laws of the synagogue in fact prescribed that the prayers be read according to the practices and traditions of the Great Synagogue of London; the congregation established an all-male choir in 1887. A hazzan, accompanied by an all-male choir, lead services every Shabbat and on Jewish holidays.

The members of the clergy of Congregation Shaar Hashomayim are robed for every Shabbat, Festival and High Holy Day service, with the Cantor and Ritual Director wearing traditional cantorial hats. Clergy and officers wear morning suits, with the President, parnass and other congregational officers seated on the bimah wearing top hats. On Festivals, tailcoats replace the morning coats. Male congregants typically wear business attire and women are required to cover their shoulders.

== Choir ==
Shaar Hashomayim's choir performed on Leonard Cohen's Grammy- and Juno Award–winning album You Want It Darker. Together with Cantor Gideon Zelermyer, the choir provided the backing vocals for "You Want It Darker" as well as "It Seemed the Better Way". They performed the album's title track and Cohen's "Tower of Song" at the 2017 Tower of Song: A Memorial Tribute to Leonard Cohen concert, in collaboration with Willie Nelson, Céline Dion, Peter Gabriel, and Chris Martin. The Choir also appeared on Cohen's posthumous album Thanks for the Dance, performing backing vocals for "Puppets".

== Notable members ==
- Charles Bronfman, businessman
- Joe Cohen, trial lawyer and member of Quebec's Legislative Assembly
- Leonard Cohen, singer-songwriter
- Lyon Cohen, businessman
- Sheila Finestone, Member of Parliament and Senator
- Maxwell M. Kalman, architect
- Victoria Kaspi, astrophysicist
- Leo Kolber, Senator
- Marvin Kwitko, ophthalmologist
- Sam Steinberg, businessman
