= Goldie Hershon =

Canadian activist (1941–2020)

President of the Canadian Jewish Congress
- In office 1995–1998
- Preceded by: Irving Abella
- Succeeded by: Moshe Ronen

Personal details
- Born: Goldie Brenda Libman; June 25, 1941 Montreal, Quebec, Canada
- Died: December 4, 2020 (aged 79) Montreal, Quebec, Canada
- Spouse: Sheldon Hershon (m. 1959)
- Awards: 125th Anniversary of the Confederation of Canada Medal (1992)

Goldie Brenda Hershon (July 25, 1941 – December 4, 2020) was a Canadian activist from Montreal and former president of the Canadian Jewish Congress (1995–1998). Her presidency was marked by the focus on national unity, support for Jewish communities living in smaller Canadian centres, aid to Jewish communities in places like the former Soviet Union, and the prosecution of Nazi war criminals living in Canada.

== Biography ==
Born to Polish Jewish immigrants in the Park Avenue district of Montreal, Hershon attended United Talmud Torahs, Herzliah High School, and Baron Byng High School. She later received a certificate in family life education from Concordia University.

Hershon became involved in Jewish advocacy after a 1979 visit to Auschwitz. Prior to seeking the presidency, Hershon served as national vice-president of the Canadian Jewish Congress (CJC), Chair of the CJC National Plenary Assembly, Vice-Chair of the North American branch of the World Jewish Congress, and member of the Canadian Human Rights Tribunal. She was Chair of the CJC Quebec Region from 1989 to 1992. For more than a decade, she was active in the Soviet Jewry Movement.

In fighting against Quebec separatism, she made her mark leading the Canadian Jewish Congress's national unity strategy. Hershon was instrumental in forming a national coalition of Canada's Italian, Greek and Jewish communities during the debate on the Charlottetown Accord.

Among other activities, Hershon was involved in the effort to retrieve deposits made into Swiss banks by victims of Nazi persecution during and prior to World War II. She was a member of Prime Minister Jean Chrétien's contingent at the funeral of assassinated Israeli Prime Minister Yitzhak Rabin, and addressed the House of Commons Justice Committee in the aftermath of the September 11 attacks.

Preceded by Irving Abella	President of the Canadian Jewish Congress; 1995–1998	Succeeded by Moshe Ronen
