= Centre for Israel and Jewish Affairs =

Canadian Zionist advocacy organization

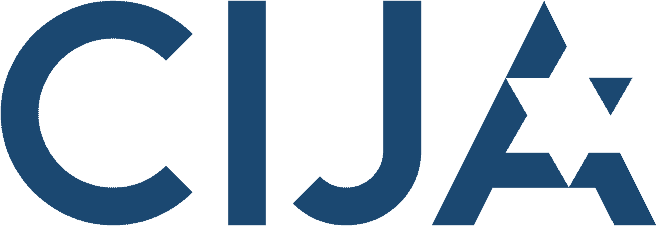
- Abbreviation: CIJA
- Formation: 2004; 2011
- Type: Advocacy group
- Headquarters: Toronto, Ontario, Canada
- Official languages: English; French
- Chair: Elan Pratzer
- CEO: Noah Shack
- Budget: Approx. $11 million (2012)
- Website: cija.ca
- Formerly called: Canadian Council for Israel and Jewish Advocacy

The Centre for Israel and Jewish Affairs (CIJA; French: Centre consultatif des relations juives et israéliennes) is a Canadian Zionist and Jewish advocacy organization and an agency of the Jewish Federations of Canada. It was founded in 2004 as the Canadian Council for Israel and Jewish Advocacy (CCIJA) and headquartered in the district of North York within Toronto, Ontario.

== History ==
In 2011, CIJA assumed its current name following an 18-month restructuring process in which the functions of the Canadian Jewish Congress, the Canada-Israel Committee, the Quebec-Israel Committee, and the National Jewish Campus Life and University Outreach Committee were consolidated. The group's chief executive officer was Hershell Ezrin, until his retirement at the end of 2010. Shimon Fogel, former CEO of the Canada-Israel Committee, then was CEO until his retirement in December 2024, when he was succeeded by Noah Shack.

In September 2024, CIJA formally requested of the Canadian government to adopt four new policies to help ensure the safety of Canadian Jews. In October 2024, CIJA reported that 82% of Canadian Jews feel less safe after October 7.

== Atlantic Jewish Council ==
The Atlantic Jewish Council, founded in 1975, is CJIA's Atlantic partner and was previously the Atlantic Canadian office of the Canadian Jewish Congress. Howard Conter is the president of its board of directors, and its executive director is Jon Goldberg. As a result of the Canadian Jewish Congress' reorganization in 2007, the AJC became an individual member rather than an affiliate organization of the CJC; this was further reformed after the establishment of the Centre for Israel and Jewish Affairs, which subsumed the CJC in 2011. The AJC also owns and operates Camp Kadimah.

=== Camp Kadimah ===
Camp Kadimah, founded in 1943 and affiliated with Canadian Young Judaea, is located on the South Shore of Nova Scotia in Lunenburg County. Campers range from 8 to 16 years of age. Many of the campers are from Toronto but there remains a large portion of campers from Halifax. Many of the campers also from Israel.

There are 5 sections are the camp. The youngest sections, Giborim and Goshrim occupy the main side of the bridge. Giborim, the youngest section, means 'mighty', or 'heroes' in Hebrew. Goshrim, for children aged 10–11, means 'bridge builders.' Kochot, the next section, means 'power.' Machar, the eldest section means 'tomorrow.' There is also a Counsellors in Training program that fosters the development of teenagers into adults. The CITs live on the Machar side of the bridge. The camp is Kosher and nut-free. In 2009, ten teenagers from Sderot, Israel attended Camp Kadimah.

== Controversies ==
In 2023, Canadians for Justice and Peace in the Middle East criticized "provocative statements" made by CIJA Israel office director David M. Weinberg. His statements make use of dehumanizing terms to refer to Arabs, Muslims, Palestinians, and human rights activists, calling them “weeds”, “snakes”, “barbarians”, and “terrorists”. In 2025, a report authored by the Jewish Faculty Network alleged that CIJA "promotes anti-Palestinian racism."

In 2020, CIJA sought to block Valentina Azarova, a legal academic critical of Israel’s human rights record, from being named the director of the International Human Rights Program at the University of Toronto’s Faculty of Law. CIJA asked a judge, who was a donor to the university and a former CIJA board member, to inform university leadership that “a public protest campaign [that] will do major damage to the university, including in fundraising.” A public controversy erupted after the university decided not to offer Azarova the position. Azarova was eventually reoffered the position but declined.

In 2025, Birju Dattani the first Muslim named Chief Commissioner of the Canadian Human Rights Commission, sued CIJA, right-wing media personality Ezra Levant and conservative politician Melissa Lantsman for defamation. CIJA had opposed Dattani's appointment and claimed he had a history of antisemitic activities. Dattani resigned from the role after an independent third-party investigation cleared him of this allegation finding that: “we cannot find that Mr. Dattani harboured or harbours any beliefs that would be characterized as anti-Semitic or that he has demonstrated any biases (conscious or unconscious) towards Jews or Israelis,” but raised procedural concerns about disclosure during the application process.

== See also ==
- B'nai Brith Canada
- Canadian Jewish Political Affairs Committee
- Independent Jewish Voices (Canada)
