= Keith M. Landy =

President of the Canadian Jewish Congress
- In office 2001–2004
- Preceded by: Moshe Ronen
- Succeeded by: Ed Morgan

Personal details
- Born: 1950 Coventry, England, United Kingdom
- Died: February 24, 2017 (aged 66) Toronto, Ontario, Canada

Keith M. Landy (1950-2017) was a Canadian lawyer and former president of the Canadian Jewish Congress.

Landy was born in Coventry, England and moved with his family to South Africa, then emigrated to Canada where he was educated at the University of Windsor's law school. He became senior and founding partner in the Toronto law firm of Landy, Marr, Kats LLP.

Landy was national president of the Canadian Jewish Congress from 2001 to 2004. He had previously been chair of the CJC, Ontario Region from 1998 to 2001 and held various other offices in the organization. He also served as a vice-president of the World Jewish Congress and as a member of the Executive Committee of the Conference on Jewish Material Claims. In 2008, he served as chair of the CJC's War Crimes Committee.

As Chair of CJC Ontario, Landy successfully lobbied for passage of the Holocaust Memorial Day – Yom Hashoah- Act by the Ontario Legislature. He also served as a delegate to the 2001 United Nations' World Conference Against Racism, Racial Discrimination and Xenophobia in Durban, South Africa. In April 2004, he was a member of the official Canadian governmental delegation to the Organization for Security and Cooperation in Europe (OSCE) conference on antisemitism.

Landy died in early 2017 at the age of 66. He has two children, Michelle and Josh, along with three grandchildren.

== Honours ==
In 2002, Landy was a recipient of the Queen's Golden Jubilee Medal. In 2005, he received the Lincoln Alexander Award from the Law Society of Upper Canada, honoring his commitment to public and community service and to the people of Ontario for his work for human rights and religious tolerance.

Preceded by Moshe Ronen	President of the Canadian Jewish Congress; 2001-2004	Succeeded by Ed Morgan
