= Canadian Jewish Political Affairs Committee =

Pro-Israel political organization group in the Canada

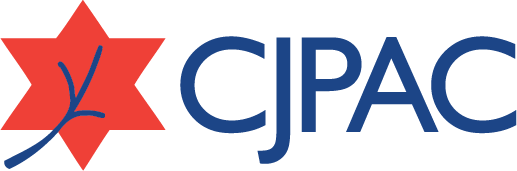
- Abbreviation: CJPAC
- Purpose: Advocate and public voice, educator and network
- Headquarters: Toronto, Ontario, Canada
- Region served: Canada
- Official language: English; French
- Executive director: Mark Waldman
- Staff: 20
- Website: cjpac.ca

The Canadian Jewish Political Affairs Committee (CJPAC) is a Canadian political organization. The organization's current stated goal is to engage Jewish Canadians and their allies in the democratic process. Previously, the organization was specifically pro-Israel as well.

It is a successor to the Canadian Council for Israel and Jewish Advocacy, now called the Centre for Israel and Jewish Affairs (CIJA). CIJA focuses on advocacy, while CJPAC focuses on political engagement.

CJPAC's programs include a fellowship program for university students and student leadership program for high school students. CJPAC's events include the ACTION party that connects CJPAC members, politicians, and other politically active people.
