= Association of Haitian Taxi Drivers =

Workers' rights organization in Montreal, Canada

The Association of Haitian Taxi Drivers (French: Association haïtienne des travailleurs de taxi, lit. 'Haitian Association of Taxi Workers') was a workers' rights organization organized by Haitian Canadian taxi drivers in Montreal, Quebec. It was founded in 1982 to combat against workplace discrimination and anti-Black racism experienced by Haitian taxi drivers in the city. The Canadian Human Rights Commission began an inquiry on the matter in 1982, in part due to the association's demonstrations. The inquiry published a report in 1984 detailing systemic discrimination in Montreal's taxi industry, and a government oversight committee was formed the following year to stop the discrimination. Two taxi companies were also fined for their misconduct.

== Background ==
The number of Haitian taxi drivers in Montreal grew exponentially in the 1970s, increasing from a few dozen in 1974 to at least 800 in 1982, or 10% of all taxi drivers in the city. During the early 1980s, Montreal was facing high unemployment amid an economic crisis, and immigrant workers were labelled "job stealers" by locals.

Haitian taxi drivers endured anti-Black racism from both their employers and customers during this period. In 1977, Le Journal de Montréal reported that the taxi company Expo de Montréal refused to hire 30 Haitian drivers on the basis of their skin. Similarly, another company, SOS Taxi, fired 20 Haitian drivers in June 1982, based on customers' complaints that there were "too many Black drivers" and the refusal of some White drivers to work with their Black colleagues, whom they blamed for the industry's economic difficulties. Transport Canada also reported receiving complaints against Haitian drivers, and many were consequently banned from Dorval Airport (now Montréal–Trudeau International Airport).

== History ==
Haitian taxi drivers formed the eponymous Association of Haitian Taxi Drivers in 1982 to collectively fight back against workplace discrimination and racism. The association's stated objectives, published in March 1983, were to "defend its members' interests, educate the public, persuade the government to take appropriate steps, and try to mitigate the problems arising between drivers of differing origins".

Association members held demonstrations and engaged in picketing campaigns to raise awareness. The Canadian Human Rights Commission (HRC) opened an inquiry on the matter in July 1982 and association members attended the public hearings that arose from it. The Ligue des droits et libertés (LDL), a Quebec human rights organization, helped the drivers prepare and file their briefs. The association's efforts also received the support of the Bureau de la Communauté Chrétienne des Haïtiens de Montréal (BCCHM, led by Paul Déjean), the Montreal Regional Committee of the Congress of Black Women of Canada, the Maison d'Haïti, and the Comité de promotion des minorités. The association was headquartered in the offices of the BCCHM, and received consul from the LDL.

Willy Cicéron was the association's coordinator; in 1983 he was hospitalized after being injured by projectiles thrown through the window of his taxi.

In 1984, the HRC published an extensive report on systemic discrimination in the Montreal taxi industry as a result of its inquiry. An oversight committee was consequently created in March 1985 to combat against racism in the industry, with the support of the Department of Transport, the Department of Industry and Commerce, the Montreal Taxi Bureau, the BCCHM, the LDL, and the Association of Haitian Taxi Drivers. Two taxi companies were also ordered to pay a fine of CA$500 and an additional $2,500 in expenses.

In September 2016, the association joined other labour groups in Montreal's taxi industry in an injunction against the Quebec government and Uber, demanding that the latter cease its "illegal transportation service".
