= Wilfred Shuchat =

Canadian scholar and rabbi

Wilfred G. Shuchat

Personal life
- Born: June 9, 1920 Montreal, Quebec, Canada
- Died: December 27, 2018 (aged 98)
- Education: McGill University
- Occupation: Scholar and Rabbi

Religious life
- Religion: Judaism
- Synagogue: Congregation Shaar Hashomayim
- Position: Rabbi Emeritus

Wilfred G. Shuchat (9 June 1920 – 27 December 2018) was a Canadian scholar and rabbi.

== Biography ==
Shuchat was born in Montreal, Canada, and studied at McGill University, receiving his BA in 1941. He was ordained at the Jewish Theological Seminary of America in 1945, which institution also awarded him an honorary D.D. in 1971. He served as rabbi in Albany, New York, at the Congregation Sons of Israel and after that in Buffalo at Temple Beth El. He then moved to Montreal and served as rabbi at the Congregation Shaar Hashomayim, and later became rabbi emeritus.

One of his career highlights was conceiving and consulting on the Pavilion of Judaism at 1967 International and Universal Exposition in Montreal, known as Expo 67.

He has published a number of influential books; among them The Gate of Heaven: The Story of Congregation Shaar Hashomayim in Montreal (2000) and The Creation According to Midrash Rabbah (2002). He is one of the founders of the Union for Traditional Judaism, an organization that promotes traditional Jewish observance within the framework of Conservative Judaism.

Shuchat's son, Rabbi Dr. Raphael Shuchat, is a writer and lecturer in Jewish philosophy and mysticism at Bar-Ilan and Hebrew universities in Israel. Shuchat died in December 2018 at the age of 98.

== Works ==
- Shuchat, Wilfred G. (2000). The Gate of Heaven: The Story of Congregation Shaar Hashomayim in Montreal. Montreal & Ithaca: McGill-Queen's University Press. ISBN 978-0-7735-2089-9. OCLC 48195422.
- ——— (2002). The Creation According to Midrash Rabbah. Jerusalem & New York: Devora Publishing. ISBN 978-1-9301-4340-1. OCLC 51880817.
- ——— (2006). The Garden of Eden & The Struggle to be Human: according to the Midrash Rabbah. Jerusalem & New York: Devora Publishing. ISBN 978-1-9326-8731-6. OCLC 71379327.
- ——— (2013). Noah, the Flood and the Failure of Man: according to the Midrash Rabbah. Jerusalem & New York: Devora Publishing. ISBN 978-9-6552-4128-0. OCLC 823379536.
- ——— (2018). Abraham and the Challenge of Faith: according to the Midrash Rabbah. Jerusalem & New York: Urim Publications. ISBN 978-9-6552-4273-7.
