= Samuel William Jacobs =

Canadian politician

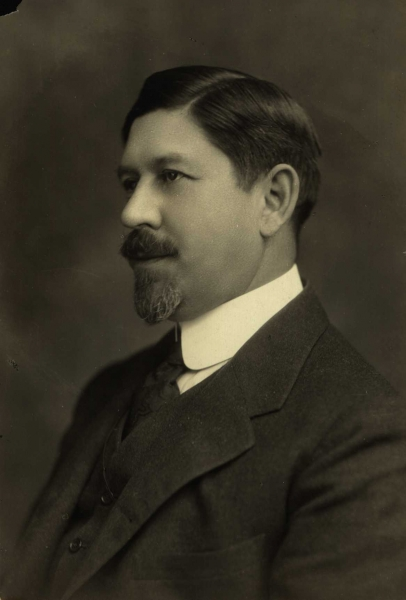

Member of the Canadian Parliament for George-Étienne Cartier
- In office 1917–1925
- Preceded by: District was created in 1914.
- Succeeded by: District was abolished in 1924.

Member of the Canadian Parliament for Cartier
- In office 1925–1938
- Preceded by: District was created in 1924.
- Succeeded by: Peter Bercovitch

Personal details
- Born: May 6, 1871 Lancaster, Ontario, Canada
- Died: August 21, 1938 (aged 67)
- Party: Liberal
- Education: McGill University; Laval University

Samuel William Jacobs, KC, (May 6, 1871 – August 21, 1938) was a Canadian lawyer, Member of Parliament and a leader of the Canadian Jewish community. For many years he was the only Jewish MP in the House of Commons of Canada. He was first elected from the Montreal riding of George-Étienne Cartier (later known as Cartier) in the 1917 federal election as a Laurier Liberal and remained in parliament as a Liberal MP until his death in 1938.

== Biography ==
Jacobs graduated from McGill University with a law degree in 1893 and went on to earn a Masters of Law from Laval University in Montreal In 1897 Jacobs, Lyon Cohen, and several others founded the Jewish Times; the first English language Jewish newspaper in Canada.

He was called to the Quebec bar in 1894 and became a prominent lawyer active in criminal as well as civil law. In 1895, he co-founded the firm that is now the Montreal office of one of Canada's leading law firms, Davies Ward Phillips & Vineberg LLP. He was named King's Counsel in 1906.

As a lawyer, Jacobs took on several notable civil rights cases including the Pinsler case which dealt with Jewish educational rights and the Plamondon case dealing with the aftermath of an antisemitic speech by Joseph Plamondon in 1910 in Quebec City that resulted in Jewish shopkeepers being attacked. In the 1917 federal election, Jacobs was recruited by the Liberal Party to run in the newly created Cartier riding which had a large Jewish population (though never a majority). He won his first election by more than 5,000 votes and would be re-elected throughout his career with large pluralities. In parliament, Jacobs became a voice not only against anti-Semitism but also in support of other minorities facing discrimination such as the Doukhobors.

Jacobs is notable for having successfully introduced as an Opposition MP two private member's bills that were passed into law. In 1919 his Act to amend the House of Commons Act (Bill 9) ended the practice of candidates being able to run in more than one seat simultaneously and introduced a requirement that by-elections be called to fill a vacant parliamentary seat within six months of the vacancy occurring. In 1931 his Act to remove the necessity of the re-election of Members of the House of Commons of Canada on acceptance of office (Bill 35) ended the practice of newly appointed Cabinet ministers being required to resign and recontest their seats in the House of Commons through a by-election.

Jacobs advocated free immigration to Canada stating that free immigration is the solution to Canada's economic problems. He further stated that Canada should take advantage of the fact that the United States limited immigration and attract the best type of all classes of immigrants.

With the rise of Adolf Hitler in Europe, growing anti-Semitism and a mounting Jewish refugee crisis, the Canadian Jewish Congress was revived in 1934 after several decades of inactivity. Jacobs was elected the reconvened Congress' first president and remained the CJC's leader until his death four years later. During this period Jacobs along with Sam Factor and Abraham Albert Heaps, fought a largely unsuccessful battle to force the Canadian government to lift quotas restricting the entry of Jews, particularly German Jews fleeing the Nazi regime, into Canada.

== Archives ==
There is a Samuel William Jacob fonds (reference number R4654) at Library and Archives Canada.

Preceded by Lyon Cohen	President of the Canadian Jewish Congress; 1934-1938	Succeeded by Samuel Bronfman
