= George-Étienne Cartier (electoral district) =

Former federal electoral district in Quebec, Canada

Quebec electoral district

Defunct federal electoral district
- Legislature: House of Commons
- District created: 1914
- District abolished: 1924
- First contested: 1917
- Last contested: 1921

George-Étienne Cartier was a federal electoral district in Quebec, Canada, that was represented in the House of Commons of Canada from 1917 to 1925.

This riding was created in 1914 from parts of Maisonneuve and St. Lawrence ridings. It consisted of the St. Louis and St. Jean Baptiste wards of the city of Montreal.

The electoral district was abolished in 1924 when it was redistributed into Cartier, St. James and St. Lawrence—St. George ridings.

It was named in honour of the Quebec politician George-Étienne Cartier.

== Members of Parliament ==
This riding elected the following members of Parliament:

Parliament	Years	Member	Party
George-Étienne Cartier; Riding created from Maisonneuve and St. Lawrence
13th	1917–1921	Samuel William Jacobs	Opposition (Laurier Liberals)
14th	1921–1925	Samuel William Jacobs	Liberal
Riding dissolved into Cartier, St. James and St. Lawrence—St. George

== Election results ==
1917 Canadian federal election
Party	Candidate	Votes
Opposition (Laurier Liberals)	Samuel William Jacobs	6,130
Labour	Michael Buhay	608
Unknown	Joseph Camille Bernier	512

1921 Canadian federal election
Party	Candidate	Votes
Liberal	Samuel William Jacobs	7,790
Independent	Joseph Ovila Cartier	3,519
Independent	Michael Buhay	1,522
Conservative	Henri Arthur Cholette	854
Independent	Louis Omnes Maille	109

== See also ==
- List of Canadian electoral districts
- Historical federal electoral districts of Canada
