= Moshe Ronen =

Canadian lawyer

President of the Canadian Jewish Congress
- In office 1998–2001
- Preceded by: Goldie Hershon
- Succeeded by: Keith M. Landy

Personal details
- Born: 1958 or 1959 (age 66–67) Ramat Gan, Israel
- Spouse: Dara Ronen

Moshe Ronen is a Canadian lawyer, and a Jewish community leader. Ronen served as vice-president of the World Jewish Congress, national chair of the Canada-Israel Committee, and president of the Canadian Jewish Congress from 1998 to 2001.

== Biography ==
Moshe Ronen was born in Ramat Gan, Israel, to Holocaust survivors Mordechai and Ilana Ronen. He immigrated to Canada at the age of 6. He was educated at the Associated Hebrew School and Community Hebrew Academy of Toronto (CHAT) before obtaining a degree in political science and economics from York University and a law degree from the University of Windsor. During his studies he served as vice-chairman of the World Union of Jewish Students and president of the North American Jewish Students' Network.

In the 1970s and 1980s Ronen was an activist in the Movement to Free Soviet Jewry in support of refusenik political prisoners in the Soviet Union, and to allow emigration of Soviet Jews to Israel. In 1985, he led an international student protest against US President Ronald Reagan's visit to a cemetery in Bitburg, Germany that contained Nazi SS graves. Later that year, he was arrested for staging a sit-in at the offices of Soviet airline company Aeroflot during the Geneva Summit.

In 1996, he was awarded the Jewish National Fund's Jerusalem of Gold Award and, in 1998, was received a Volunteer Service Award from the Province of Ontario.

Ronen succeeded Goldie Hershon as national president of the Canadian Jewish Congress (CJC) in 1998. As CJC president, he successfully advocated the recognition of Yom Hashoah by each provincial government in Canada as a means of remembering and educating people about the Holocaust. In January 1999, he accompanied Prime Minister Jean Chrétien on a visit to the Auschwitz-Birkenau extermination camp.

| Preceded by Goldie Hershon | President of the Canadian Jewish Congress; 1998-2001 | Succeeded by Keith M. Landy |
