= Canada-Israel Committee =

- Abbreviation: CIC
- Dissolved: 2011
- Type: Organizations based in Canada
- Legal status: Defunct
- Purpose: Advocacy and public voice, educator and network
- Headquarters: Ottawa, Ontario, Canada
- Region served: Canada
- Official language: English, French, Also Hebrew
- Parent organization: Canadian Council for Israel and Jewish Advocacy
- Affiliations: UIA Federations Canada

The Canada-Israel Committee (CIC) was the official representative of the organized Canadian Jewish community on matters pertaining to Canada–Israel relations.

The Canada-Israel Committee maintained offices in Ottawa, Toronto, Montreal, Vancouver and Israel, and was affiliated with the Quebec-Israel Committee. Its staff consisted of experts in government policy, communications, Arab-Israeli relations and Middle East affairs, and Canadian Middle East policy.

Due to a restructuring of Jewish community bodies, effective July 1, 2011, the CIC ceased operations, and its responsibilities were assumed by its parent organization, the Centre for Israel and Jewish Affairs (CIJA).

== Funding ==
CIC was funded by the Centre for Israel and Jewish Affairs, the advocacy arm of Jewish Federations of Canada - UIA.

== Programming ==
The CIC's goal was to increase understanding between the peoples of Canada and Israel. It was a voluntary, non-profit organization that enjoyed the support of Canadians from all walks of life. In seeking to enhance Canada-Israel friendship, the CIC liaised with government, media, business and the academic sector, often submitting briefs and providing background analyses on matters of public policy. In addition, it sponsored seminars, conferences and other types of educational programming in Canada, and organized study missions to Israel.

== Formational History ==
Jewish immigration of the late 19th and early 20th centuries brought to Canada the diversity of Zionist thought, which led to the creation of several Zionist parties. Uniting these parties was difficult because each had considerable vertical integration, from international support to national and local activity. Only by way of World War II and the British Mandate of Palestine, was lasting cooperation achieved. A common solidarity to Israel united Canadian Jewry past its divisions, establishing a precedent that would lead to the beginning of the CIC.

The decades following the British Mandate saw a consolidation of Zionism in Canada. By the 1960s, several pan-Zionist organizations had been created, including the Zionist Public Affairs Committee, the Committee for Emergency Aid to Israel, and the Joint Public Relations Committee. Most of these groups were maintained on an ad hoc basis, often emerging in response to significant events in Israel.

In 1967, the Joint Public Relations Committee evolved into the Canada-Israel Committee. The new committee was authorized by public mandate to represent Israeli interests before the Canadian Parliament, public, and media. But most importantly, the CIC was designed to link Canadian Jews to the halls of power in Ottawa.

== Early years ==
The CIC underwent difficulties in its first years of operation. It was briefly disbanded in 1971 when its funding partners could not reconcile differing visions. Later in 1971, the CIC was restored. Under the leadership of Myer Bick, the CIC secured funding from B'nai Brith and hired personnel at its Montreal location. The Canadian Jewish Congress and the Canadian Zionist Federation later became funding partners to the CIC.

The 1973 Yom Kippur War compelled the CIC to magnify its reach to better service Israel in its time of need. It added a French-speaking division at its Montreal office and launched new offices in Toronto and Ottawa. The CIC was thrust to the forefront of policy making by Canada's desire to support Israel in the conflict. Because the war placed the CIC at the epicenter of Canadian decision making, the committee used its newfound influence to advance an Israel-centric foreign policy within Canada. The CIC's Toronto office performed Middle East research and published pertinent information to the news media, and the Ottawa branch focused lobbying efforts on the Canadian Parliament. It provided news outlets with features and audio-visual productions that favored Israel. In the 1980s, the CIC created an additional office in Montreal. This office maintained contact with the Ottawa office to coordinate strategy and focused primarily on regional services and activism.

== Organizational structure ==
=== Leadership ===
The Canada-Israel Committee's operations were steered primarily by its board of directors, which composed of sponsoring organizations, representatives from various Jewish communities, and a compilation of other nationally influential Zionist groups. The board met quarterly to set, plan, and implement its agenda. Additionally, the CIC was governed by its executive committee, which consisted of nine to twelve members. In times of fast-moving developments or emergencies, the executive committee would take over the helm of the CIC and functioned under a flexible response regime.

In its first decades of existence, the head of the CIC was the national executive director. This person was tasked with administering budgetary priorities and being the chief spokesman on behalf of the committee. In the end, the national executive director remained beholden to the board of directors for implementing prerogatives and reporting process. In the late 1980s, the organization modified its leadership hierarchy to a single chairman, with two Vice Chairs serving directly under the chairman. The position of CEO was also created at the Ottawa office to spearhead media and business relations, though it remained separate from the board of directors. These individuals served on the CIC board of directors in 2006:

Position	Name(s)
Chair	Marc Gold
Vice Chair	Moshe Ronen
Vice Chair	Barbara Farber
Board Members	Sylvain Abitbol, Daniel Amar, Jason Caron, Father Raymond J. De Souza, Michael Diamond, Dr. Michael Elterman, Professor Karen Eltis, Professor Aviva Freedman, Linda Frum, Joseph Gabay, Brenda Gewurz, Norman Godfrey, Paul Goldman, Cary Green, Sidney Greenberg, Dr. Lawrence Hart, Donna Holbrook, Warren Kinsella, Honorable Leo Kolber, David Kroft, Ezra Levant, Susan McArthur, Eric Maldoff, Brian Morris, Berl Nadler, Joe Nadler, Nancy Sosenfeld, Shoel Silver, Norman Stern, Hymie Weinstein Q.C., Michael Zatzman

=== Mode of operation ===
Functionally, the CIC was a centralized organization, with its focal point being the Ottawa office. This arrangement was naturally advantageous for the CIC because foreign policy itself was, and remains today, consolidated in Ottawa with the Canadian federal government. Yet the need to include all Jewish communities at the table, particularly small, rural localities, was an institutionally binding feature of the CIC. Thus, the committee decentralized some power to better incorporate all Jewish representatives across Canada into the organization.

=== Structure ===
Overall, the CIC's structure was distinctly similar to the corporate model of governance. Much of its membership came from the wealthy and upper-classes of Canadian Jewry, who often had familiarity with corporate procedures, organization, and operation. Uniquely, the CIC had no due-paying membership base. This is in contrast to other Canadian Jewish organizations, such as B'nai Brith, which relied on dues. Without a membership base, the CIC could exercise independence in a manner membership-based organization could not; however, the CIC could not self-sufficiently procure revenue without members. Thus, the CIC was principally reliant on donor organizations for money, and therefore, was answerable to them.

== Activity ==
=== Lobbying ===
==== Parliament ====
CIC lobbying efforts directed toward the Canadian federal government came in a variety of arrangements. Most popular among these were standard interest group mailed letters, petitions, and phone calls to members of parliament. The CIC further employed "advertisements, demonstrations, and whisper campaigns..." With the intent to brief government officials, the CIC published a biweekly communiqué entitled The Middle East Digest to members of Parliament and senior staff. Regarded as highly reputable, the brief examined Middle Eastern current events, Israeli actions in the region, and Canadian policy, while providing recommendations moving forward. The brief, tailored for busy members of Parliament (MPs), was professionally designed with analysis presented on the broader Middle East, so as to not appear concerned solely with Israel. The CIC hoped to garner support for Israel amongst MPs with the convenience of these briefs. Moreover, the CIC invited select MPs and members of the media to attend annual trips to Israel. CIC outreach to back-benchers and new MPs was personalized to parallel the values of the Canadian parties with which it interacted. Reaching out to new MPs was seen as a generational investment in support for Israel. Doing this allowed the CIC to build and sustain ties across political persuasions. The CIC firmly believed that the back-benchers of today could become the Prime Ministers of tomorrow. Regardless of which party held power, the CIC sought enduring positive Canada-Israel relations.

To produce a government more receptive to its lobbying, the CIC issued soft warnings to MPs who voted counter to their positions. These warnings included reminding MPs the strength of individual Jewish voters in crucial swing districts and the financial power held by Jewish elites. However, the CIC was a reluctant actor in electoral politics. Local organization was predominantly in charge of informing Jewish voters who were allies to their cause and who were not. The national organization largely avoided political campaigns, leaving donations to private individuals. Instead, the CIC sought positive working relationships whichever party took power. To this end, the CIC invited all Canadian MPs to its annual dinner to nurture its bipartisan political appeal.

==== Bureaucracy ====
The CIC made great strides to cultivate an image of reliability and expertise with the Department of External Affairs. On policy relating to the Arab-Israeli conflict, the CIC used its relations with the department to steer policy decisions. Former department officials attested to the CIC's ability to shape policy, especially when Israel faced external conflict. The CIC met several times per year with cabinet officials and occasionally with the prime minister. Lobbies were sent out most consistently to the Secretary of State for External Affairs, and depending on developments in the Middle East, would meet through more informal channels.

=== Community outreach and conciliation ===
==== Professional development ====
Beyond lobbying, the CIC was active in the Jewish community with its circulation of research, policy memorandums, and handbooks. Every year, the CIC hosted a large conference highlighting their work. All Jews were invited, and they could connect with both politicians and organizational leadership to learn about CIC's mission and scope. Further, the CIC constructed a networking platform for Jewish industrial leaders, academia, and activists. Leadership workshops were sporadically made available for these individuals.

==== Striving for unification ====
Canadian Jews were, and remain, very active political participants. The CIC channeled this activism into influence through its platform off speaking for Canadian Jewry writ large. Because the CIC's scope amalgamated the whole of Canadian Jewry into one, the diversity within the organization was immense, and consequently, the necessity to maintain a public face of unity was paramount. While disagreements were inevitable, they generally arose from differences of opinion on tactics, such as lobbying efforts, and not actual policy. CIC largely internalized these discrepancies and avoided commenting on topics that would divide the organization's cohesion, such as counseling or rebuking Israel. Conversely, when policy was the point of division within the Jewish community, the CIC attempted to soothe disagreements by charting a middle course between conflicting preferences. One such incident arose from the first Palestinian Intifada, beginning in 1987. The event deeply split the ideological ends of Canadian Jewry into polarized camps, consisting of the political right and left. Their respective passions for supporting Israel and maintaining peace overwhelmed conciliatory efforts by the CIC to bridge the divide through rhetoric. The CIC wanted to stake a compromise between both sides, but this led to each roundly criticizing the CIC. The left and right both perceived their opposition to be receiving favoritism from the CIC, and simultaneously, mainstream Jewry resented the CIC's incapacity to forge consensus. Preserving intra-communal harmony was a consistent challenge the CIC faced throughout its existence.

===== Unifying donors =====
Satisfying their sponsoring partners was difficult because beliefs about tactics or policy varied even within the CIC's donor base. Resolving these contradictions diverted time and effort from lobbying efforts. A notable example of this occurred in 1979. Canada's embassy in Israel was located in Tel Aviv, but there were calls to relocate it to Jerusalem. Joe Clark, a past leader of the Progressive Conservative party, was particularly in favor of the move. Intra-communal Jewish tensions swelled over this issue, forcing the CIC to respond tactically. While the embassy remained in Tel Aviv, the strains over potential relocation threatened to upend the CIC. Yet, the CIC persisted out of an innate obligation to unity, to both Canadian Jewry and the plight of Israel.

Here, at the Parliament Building, selectees to the CIC's internship program performed legislative work and gained valuable professional experience.

==== Employment opportunities ====
The Canada-Israel Committee funded an annual Parliamentary Internship Program for recent University graduates and graduate students with Canadian citizenship. Those selected (approximately 5 per year), would be paired with a backbencher MP in Ottawa for nine months to assist with committee assignments, constituent services, and other duties. Depending on the backbencher, travel and research could be incorporated into the internship experience. This position offered compensation; as of 2006, total compensation was $12,000. The CIC billed the internship as an opportunity to gain valuable policymaking experience and position themselves to influence the public sector in the future.

=== Publications ===
==== CIC Insider ====
Between the late 1990s and early 2000s, the CIC produced a litany of documents and reviews concerning current events and analyses concerning Israel from the Canadian perspective. One of the most prominent publications of the CIC was the CIC Insider, which was published several times per year. CIC Insider followed Israeli affairs, regional happenings, and the Israeli-Arab conflict, among other topics. This publication was very policy-based, which allowed the CIC connect with policy researchers in Parliament and academia.

==== Book reviews ====
The CIC compiled a listing of book reviews on publications salient to Middle Eastern affairs in the early 2000s.

==== Backgrounder ====
In the early 2000s, the CIC curated many articles examining ongoing developments in the Israeli-Arab conflict. Archives retained between 2002 and 2006 delved into recent Palestinian polling, democratic trends, and Israeli sentiments on the Palestinians. The Backgrounder was regularly updated and was maintained on the CIC's website, serving to inform Canadian Jewry and the general public.

=== In the media ===
==== Iranian sanctions ====
Upon learning that Canada completed all relevant actions in accordance with United Nations Security Council Resolution 1929, the CIC issued its support of the government and prodded it to consider further sanctions for Iran. The CIC framed the government's decision as befitting of an international leader that employs diplomacy over military involvement. CIC highlighted Iran's concealment of its nuclear program to be particularly disconcerting.

A month later, the CIC gave its full blessing to the passage of the Special Economic Measures Act, legislation designed to place economic sanctions on Iran for its nuclear program. In total, the legislation barred Canadian economic activity with select Iranian nationals, instituted an embargo on military weaponry, inhibited petroleum imports and exports with Iran, and banned Canada from providing services to Iranian shipping vessels. Shimon Fogel, then CEO of the CIC, expressed appreciation to the Canadian government for its initiative: "The Canada-Israel Committee has worked hard with all parties in Ottawa to make the case for tough, peaceful measures against Iran's nuclear program... We are very grateful that the Canadian government, with the support of opposition members, has taken the lead in confronting the regime now."

==== Hamas terrorism ====
To raise awareness of Hamas terrorism against Israel, the CIC started a new campaign entitled "What Would We Do" by asking the Canadian public how they would react to being in Israel's situation vis-á-vis Hamas. CIC leadership noted how fortunate Canadians are compared to Israelis, who were facing weekly, if not daily, aggression from Hamas. This campaign was part of the CIC's aspiration for Canada to impose a full arms blockade of Gaza, and thus enhance Israel's security.

==== Visit by Israeli PM Benjamin Netanyahu ====
Israeli Prime Minister Benjamin Netanyahu arrived in Canada for a scheduled visit with Prime Minister Stephen Harper; this was the first bilateral meeting between the Canadian and Israeli heads of state since 1994. The CIC was excited to welcome the visiting Prime Minister to deepen bilateral ties and cooperation on trade, the Middle East, and beyond. Chairman Moshe Ronen noted, "The depth of the Canada-Israel relationship is remarkable and continues to demonstrate great vitality as it expands across the many and varied economic, cultural and economic sectors to the benefit of both countries... There is tremendous potential for exponential growth, well beyond what we have already experienced." The CIC emphasized the shared values of both nations, urging the leaders to work for peace between Israel and Palestine while exploring solutions for the Iranian nuclear program.

== Case studies into the CIC and Canadian Middle East policy ==
=== Yom Kippur War—October, 1973 ===
==== Lobbying shortfalls ====
The Arab-Israeli War, with the CIC's lobbying, did not sway the Canadian government or populace drastically in favor of Israel. The CIC sought for Canada to directly condemn the Arabs states for attacking Israel, but for a number of reasons, this goal was never realized. First, the CIC was still very young, underfunded, and unknown. Structurally, the CIC had little organization and unclear prioritization of goals. Constituent organizations of the CIC, among them the Canadian Zionist Federation, were far more established politically and opted to circumvent the CIC by lobbying the government directly. This fractured coordination, weakening the CIC's effectiveness vis-á-vis the Canadian federal government. Second, Canadian politics was resistant to favoring sides in ethnic divisions. The mold of supporting Israel was historically unfounded in Canada's foreign policy for fear of alienating other groups. And finally, Canada did not feel the same fervor for Israel as did its Jewish citizens.

==== Public apathy ====
For Israel supporters, the war was perceived as an existential crisis for Israel; however, Canadian government officials could not be swayed to feel the same. A 1973 Gallup poll found approximately 73 percent of respondents to have no inclination toward either the Israelis or Arabs. Canada's indifference on the matter permeated through both society and politics, and the CIC's inexperience could not reverse this fact.

=== Arab economic boycott of Israel in Canada ===
==== Contextualization ====
Following the 1973 Arab-Israeli War, Arab nations launched a joint economic boycott of Israel. In response, the CIC employed its energies in a manner becoming of a mature ethnic interest group. The CIC lobbied department officials, members of Parliament, and cabinet heads. Further, the CIC was able to bend the political debate in its favor by highlighting the larger inequities of Arab trade practices on Canadians. Support for Israel, the CIC argued, went hand-in-hand with improving civil and human rights of Canadians. In doing so, the CIC "gain[ed] the sympathy and support of wide segments of the public" by underscoring its significance to Canada. Garnering this level of support bolstered the likelihood with which the Canadian federal government would respond to public will and address the Arab boycott.

Internal restructuring and a larger budget enhanced the CIC's prominence within Canada's Jewish community. The CIC was "the unchallenged voice of Canadian Jews in matters concerning Israel," which licensed the CIC to be the premier representative for Canadian Jews regarding the boycott. Determined lobbying influenced the framing of a government response toward the best interest of Canadians. Public opinion leaned in favor of ending the boycott, and additionally, media reporting was sympathetic to the CIC's position. This projected the CIC's messaging far beyond its own reach and was widely attributed to the degree of success achieved by Canadian Jewry.

==== Government response ====
Because of concerns that opposing the boycott would endanger Canadian relations with Arab states, the government under Prime Minister Pierre Trudeau employed delay tactics on proposed legislation. Corporate lobbies warned against economic retaliation from Arab states that would harm business. These factors negated the CIC's momentum on the issue and ultimately prevented anti-boycott legislation from becoming law. The CIC's influence, despite its impetus, marginally affected the outcome.

=== The Lebanon War of 1982 ===
==== Contextualization ====
Israel's invasion into southern Lebanon caused disillusionment within Canada over its disposition toward Israel. Prime Minister Trudeau became quite critical of Israeli actions. He penned a letter to Menachem Begin calling for the removal of Israeli forces while issuing support for the Lebanese government. Initially, the CIC stepped into the fold to argue that Israel was justified in its invasion and Canada should, at the very least, take a hands-off approach to the matter.

==== Lobbying shortfalls ====
Even though the CIC was heavily engaged with lobbying, the offensive nature of Israel's actions negated the CIC's capacity to make headway on its agenda. In several interviews post-war, top CIC officials admitted they were effectively left to defend unjustifiable military operations. When it became apparent PM Trudeau would not budge, the CIC implemented a damage control strategy over Canadian policy in the Middle East. This consisted mainly of lobbying at the highest levels of the Department of External Affairs. While its efforts could not turn Canada back against the prevailing tide of separation from Israel, it served to delay stronger Canadian-Arab relations from forming until 1989, when Canada would expand diplomatic ties with the Palestine Liberation Organization. In sum, the CIC was hamstrung by events beyond its control that made operability within Canada's political system difficult.

=== Overall policy impacts ===
==== Effectiveness ====
Many politicians and government officials have provided insight on the force of the CIC lobby. These individuals, among them Prime Minister Trudeau, spoke to their high group cohesion and tactical lobbying being of high caliber, as the CIC advocated for fewer than 2 percent of Canada's population. A former civil servant of the Department of External Affairs, when speaking at a seminar on interest groups, considered the CIC to be the standard bearer for all lobbies to emulate. The CIC was acclaimed for its seamless communication with Jews across the nation, sustained contact with DEA officials, and shaped Canada's Middle East Policy with a clear Israeli-bent, even though many DEA officials privately opposed the CIC's positions.

===== Narrative on CIC's influence =====
A noteworthy incident that highlights the power of the CIC occurred in 1988, at the CIC's annual dinner. External Affairs minister Joe Clark spoke to the delegation, articulating a belief that placed Israel in the wrong with regard to Palestine. Clark charged Israel with "human rights violations" and imposing "force and fear" on the Palestinians. Several dozen CIC attendees walked out on the speech. Shortly thereafter, the CIC condemned Clarks' speech in a press release. Clark later retracted his statements by sending a letter to CIC chair Sidney Spivak, and Canadian Prime Minister Brian Mulroney spoke to the press, affirming his government's support for Israel. In just a short amount of time, the CIC exhibited its power as an ethnic lobby.

==== Limits of power ====
Ultimately, the CIC's demands were seldom implemented in national policy. These limits to its power came primarily at the intersection of disinterest in Middle Eastern affairs. Moreover, Israel's invasion into Lebanon eroded the CIC's legitimacy in the public eye and incited the formation of Arab-Canadian interest groups. Increases in both the funding and organizational power of Arab-Canadian interest groups boosted their standings relative to the CIC, which had the effect of crowding out the CIC's lobbying efforts in ensuring decades.

== Transition to defunct status ==
=== From 1967 to early 2000s ===
From its inception in 1967, the Canada-Israel Committee was governed by its board of directors, but by the dawn of the new century, a new era of restructuring was emerging. By the early 2000s, notable Jewish individuals, among them Brent Belzberg, Steven Cummings, and Larry Tanenbaum, had begun consolidating power into the Centre for Israel and Jewish Affairs (CIJA).

=== 2011–present ===
In 2011, Canadian Jewry witnessed a complete overhaul in the makeup of Jewish advocacy groups. The CIC, Canadian Jewish Congress, Quebec-Israel Committee, National Jewish Campus Life, and the University Outreach Committee were all assimilated into the CIJA. Taking place over a period of 18 months, this move was made to amalgamate Jewish voices together for uniformity of voice and for financial purposes. Nine people were fired during the realignment. CJIA leaders contended that differences between various organizations, including the issues they responded to and lobbied for, became almost non-existent, giving credence for the merging.

==== Criticism ====
Critics posit that the disassembling of former advocacy groups was implemented undemocratically. The CJIA was not voted into existence, and its leadership is appointed to head the organization. Some have also expressed fears that certain ideas and ideologies are being crowded out by the CJIA. Perhaps due to the CJIA's size or unwillingness to consider alternative priorities, these people felt better serviced by the prior arrangement of Jewish organizations.

== See also ==
- Israel lobby in Canada
