= Monroe Abbey =

Canadian lawyer

- Born: May 30, 1904; Montreal, Quebec
- Died: November 28, 1993 (aged 89)
- Occupation: Lawyer
- Known for: Jewish community worker
- Children: 4, including Sheila Finestone

Monroe Abbey, CM (May 30, 1904 – November 28, 1993) was a Canadian lawyer specializing in mining law, and a Jewish civic leader in Montreal.

He was president of The Canadian Jewish Congress from 1968 to 1971.

He was married to Minnie Cummings, a member of a prominent family and whose brothers included Nathan Cummings and Maxwell Cummings. His daughter, Sheila Finestone, was a Member of Parliament and Senator.

In 1978, he was made a Member of the Order of Canada in recognition for being a "devoted community worker who has held office in every important Jewish organization in Montreal".

Non-profit organization positions
Preceded by Michael Garber	President of the Canadian Jewish Congress; 1968-1971	Succeeded by Sol Kanee
