= William Dunlop Tait =

William Dunlop Tait (1880-1945) was the founder of the Department of Psychology at McGill University. He served as the Department Head from 1924 to his death in 1944.

Originally from Nova Scotia, he earned his bachelor's degree at Dalhousie University, then went to the U.S. for graduate work, taking a PhD at Harvard University under the supervision of Hugo Münsterberg. He was appointed to a Lectureship in the Philosophy Department at McGill in 1909, and he founded McGill's first experimental psychology laboratory in 1910. Tait was promoted to Assistant Professor in 1914, but clashed mightily with the Head of Philosophy, William Caldwell.

In World War I, Tait commanded the 7th Canadian Siege Battery, which fought at the Battles of Vimy Ridge, Hill 70, and Passchendaele, among others.

In April 1924, the university president, Arthur Currie, agreed to Tait's long demand that psychology be separated from Philosophy and given its own Department. Simultaneously, Tait was also promoted to Professor and made Head of Psychology.

On October 19, 1926, Tait invited Harry Houdini, who was then performing in Montréal, to lecture at the McGill Union (now the McCord Museum) on the frauds perpetrated by psychics and spiritualist mediums. Three days after this lecture, J. Gordon Whitehead, a McGill student who had been invited to Houdini's dressing room at the Princess Theatre in Montréal, asked Houdini if he could withstand punches to the stomach. Houdini casually answered that he could, whereupon Whitehead attacked him. The assault injured Houdini so severely that it is said by many to have led to his death in Detroit just nine days later, on October 31. (There remains, however, much controversy over the exact cause of Houdini's death.)

Although Tait was responsible for bringing experimental psychology to McGill, his research was mostly applied in character, focusing especially on educational psychology.
