= Yudika =

Canadian poet (1898–1988)

- יודיקאַ
- Born: Yehudis (Yudis) Tsik; 7 July 1898; Gorzhd, Lithuania, Russian Empire
- Died: 1988 (aged 89–90)
- Occupation: Poet
- Writing career
- Language: Yiddish

Yehudis (Yudis) Tsik (7 July 1898 – 1988), better known by her pen name Yudika (Yiddish: יודיקאַ), was a Canadian Yiddish poet whose work was published around the world.

== Biography ==
Born on 7 July 1898, in Gorzhd, Tsik was raised with her aunt in East Prussia and later with a married brother in Frankfurt, where she began writing poetry and fiction in German. At the outbreak of World War I, she was imprisoned in a German labour camp as an enemy alien. After her release in 1915, she sought refuge in Sweden, and later lived in various cities across Finland, Russia, and Ukraine, eventually settling in Kharkov.

Using the pen name Yudika, Tsik began writing poetry in Yiddish in 1917 and, under the influence of Moyshe Taytsh, joined the Yekaterinoslav Group of Poets which included Peretz Markish, Khane Levin, and Shmuel Rosin. She attained considerable success, publishing in periodicals and anthologies. Her first book of poetry, Naye yugnt ('New Youth') was published in Kovne in 1923, and Mentsh un tsayt ('People and Time'), a dramatic epic poem, was published in the same city in 1926.

Separated from her husband in Europe, she immigrated with her son to Canada in 1929. She settled in Toronto after a short period working at an orphanage in Montreal. There she became an important member of the proletarian school of Canadian Yiddish writers, while working in the garment factories to support herself and her son. She was a regular contributor to the Keneder Adler, and published such notable works as Vandervegn ('Wandering Ways', Montreal, 1934), Shpliters ('Splinters', Toronto, 1943), and Tsar un freyd ('Pain and Joy', Toronto, 1949).

She is included in Zalmen Reisen's biographical dictionary of Yiddish writers, having previously been included in Ezra Kerman's anthology of Yiddish female poets. Dovid Katz, who includes her among a group of women he says "built Yiddish poetry in the west," identifies her as having died in New York City—where she lived in her later life—in 1988, aged 89 or 90.
