= Mona Adilman =

Jewish-Canadian poet

Mona Elaine Adilman (1924 – 1991) was a Jewish-Canadian poet living in Montreal, Quebec. She received her B.A. from McGill University in 1945. Adilman was committed to social and environmental causes, warning Quebecers against the dangers of pesticides, creating and teaching a course on Ecology and Literature at Concordia University, directing a Heritage Group called Save Montreal, and editing an anthology of writings by international poets who have suffered for expressing their religious and political beliefs (the proceeds of which have been donated to Amnesty International) Spirits of the Age: Poets of Conscience.

Adilman was married to Dr. Morris Solomon, and they had one daughter, Shelley Solomon. Her daughter established the Mona Elaine Adilman Lectureship on the Environment in her mother's memory (1992–2010).

A scholarship called the Mona Elaine Adilman Poetry Prize was established in 1992 by a bequest from Adilman in the Department of English at McGill University. The Association for Canadian Jewish Studies awarded annually the Mona Elaine Adilman English Fiction and Poetry Award on a Jewish Theme as one of the J.I. Segal Awards (2011–2018).

== Publications ==
=== Poetry ===
- Candles in the Dark. Oakville: Mosaic Press, 1990.
- Nighty-Knight. Ken Hanly ed. Dollarpoems, Series 3, no. 1, 1986
- Piece Work. (with foreword by Irving Layton), Ottawa: Borealis Press, 1980.
- Cult of Concrete. Montreal: Editions Bonsecours Editions, 1977.
- Beat of Wings: An Environmental Story. New York: Regency Press, 1972.

=== Edited ===
- Spirits of the Age: Poets of Conscience. Mona Adilman, ed. Kingston: Quarry Press, 1989.

=== Poetry Included in the Following Anthologies ===
- On Prejudice: A Global Perspective. Daniella Gioseffi, Anchor Books, Doubleday, 1993.
- Women on War. Daniela Gioseffi ed Touchstone Press, Simon & Schuster, 1988.
- Cross Cut.- Contemporary English Québec Poetry, Véhicule Press.
- The Buda Book Poetry Series., Montreal Poetry Cooperative.
- Celebrating Canadian Women., Fitzhenry & Whiteside.
- Passions & Poisons., Nu-Age Editions.
- Anthology of Magazine Verse & Yearbook of American Poetry., 1988-90.
- If I Had a Hammer: Women's Work in Poetry and Fiction., Paper-Maché Press, 1990.
- Only Morning in her Shoes., Utah State University Press, 1990.
- A Labour of Love., Polestar Press, 1989
