= Hirsch Wolofsky =

Canadian Yiddish author, publisher/editor and business owner

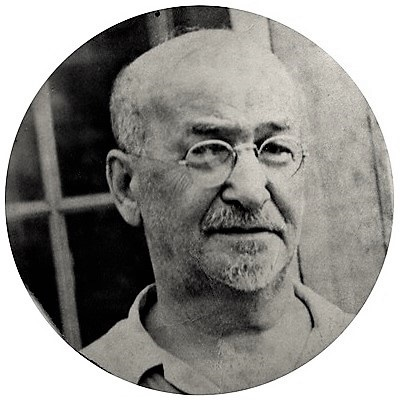
- Hirsch Wolofsky
- Born: 1878; Szydłowiec, Congress Poland
- Died: 1949 (aged 70–71)
- Occupations: Author, publisher, editor, business owner
- Spouse: Sarah Bercovitch
- Children: 8

Hirsch (Harry) Wolofsky (1878–1949), was a Canadian Yiddish author, publisher/editor and business owner.

== Biography ==
Wolofsky was born in Szydłowiec, Poland, into a Hasidic community. He received a traditional Jewish education until orphaned at 15. Soon after he moved to Łódź, married Sarah Bercovitch, and immigrated to Canada via England in 1900 to join his two brothers, Aaron and Srul Dovid who were already in Montreal.

Upon arrival, he opened a fruit store on St. Lawrence Boulevard (a.k.a. The Main). After a fire in 1907, he created the Eagle Publishing Company and started Keneder Adler ("The Canadian Eagle"), Canada's first daily Yiddish newspaper. The first issue appeared on August 30, 1907. Until the 1950s, Yiddish was Montreal's third most-spoken language, after English and French. Wolofsky served as the paper's managing editor until his death.

The Keneder Adler served an ideologically diverse readership. The paper's focus was on world events, but the editorial staff understood its importance to the neighbourhood so well that they listed births and deaths on the front page. If no deaths were announced in the morning edition, it was referred to as a "clean paper." The paper promoted Jewish education, the establishment of a Canadian Jewish Congress, the creation of a Jewish Community Council (Va'ad Ha'ir), and the building of what eventually became the Jewish General Hospital.

The Adler attracted Jewish writers of international renown such as Hebraist Reuben Brainin, who served as editor from 1912 to 1915, and featured many of Canada's Yiddish writers. Wolofsky's Adler subsidized the literary and scholarly pursuits of its associates and published many of their books. Among the books published was Canada's first Yiddish book: Moshe Elimelech Levin's Kinder Ertsiyung bay Yidn ("Children's Education Among Jews", 1910), and a local edition of the Talmud, the Adler's Shas Talmud Bavli or, as it became popularly known, the Montrealer Shas ("Montreal Talmud", 1919).

Wolofsky also wrote for the Adler. He published three Yiddish books: a travelogue titled Eyrope un Erets-Yisroel nokh dem Veltkrig ("Europe and the Land of Israel after the World War", 1922), a volume of contemporary commentary on the weekly Torah portions, Fun Eybign Kval ("From the Eternal Source", 1930), and a book of memoirs, Mayn Lebns Rayze ("Journey of My Life", 1946; English translation 1945, French translation 2000). In addition, Wolofsky served as publisher of the Anglo-Jewish weekly the Canadian Jewish Chronicle (founded 1914). He held various leadership positions in the Montreal Jewish community, including the vice presidency of both the American Union of Polish Jews and the Canadian Jewish Congress. Samuel Bronfman called him "both a recorder and maker of Canadian history."

Harry and Sarah had eight children: Philip, Dan, Sophie (who married Leon Crestohl, a Liberal Member of Parliament), Max (who took over the newspaper when his father died), Diana (died in a boating accident as a child) Moishe (Bill Walsh), Saul (Sam Walsh), who would become the long-time leader of the Communist Party of Quebec, and Miriam (Cooperberg)

According to family folklore, after Moishe and Saul became involved in the Communist Party, their father asked them to change their names so as not to embarrass the family.

A Park in the City bears his name to this day, on, Ave. Coloniale, in the City of Montreal. Parc Hirsch Wolofsky

== Legacy ==
The city of Montreal named a park after Hirsch Wolofsky, on Coloniale, between Prince-Arthur and Sherbrooke.

Wolofsky was designated a Person of National Historic Significance by the federal government in 2007, and a plaque reflecting that status from the national Historic Sites and Monuments Board was unveiled in Montreal on November 19, 2017.
