= Keneder Adler =

Canadian Yiddish newspaper (1907-1977)

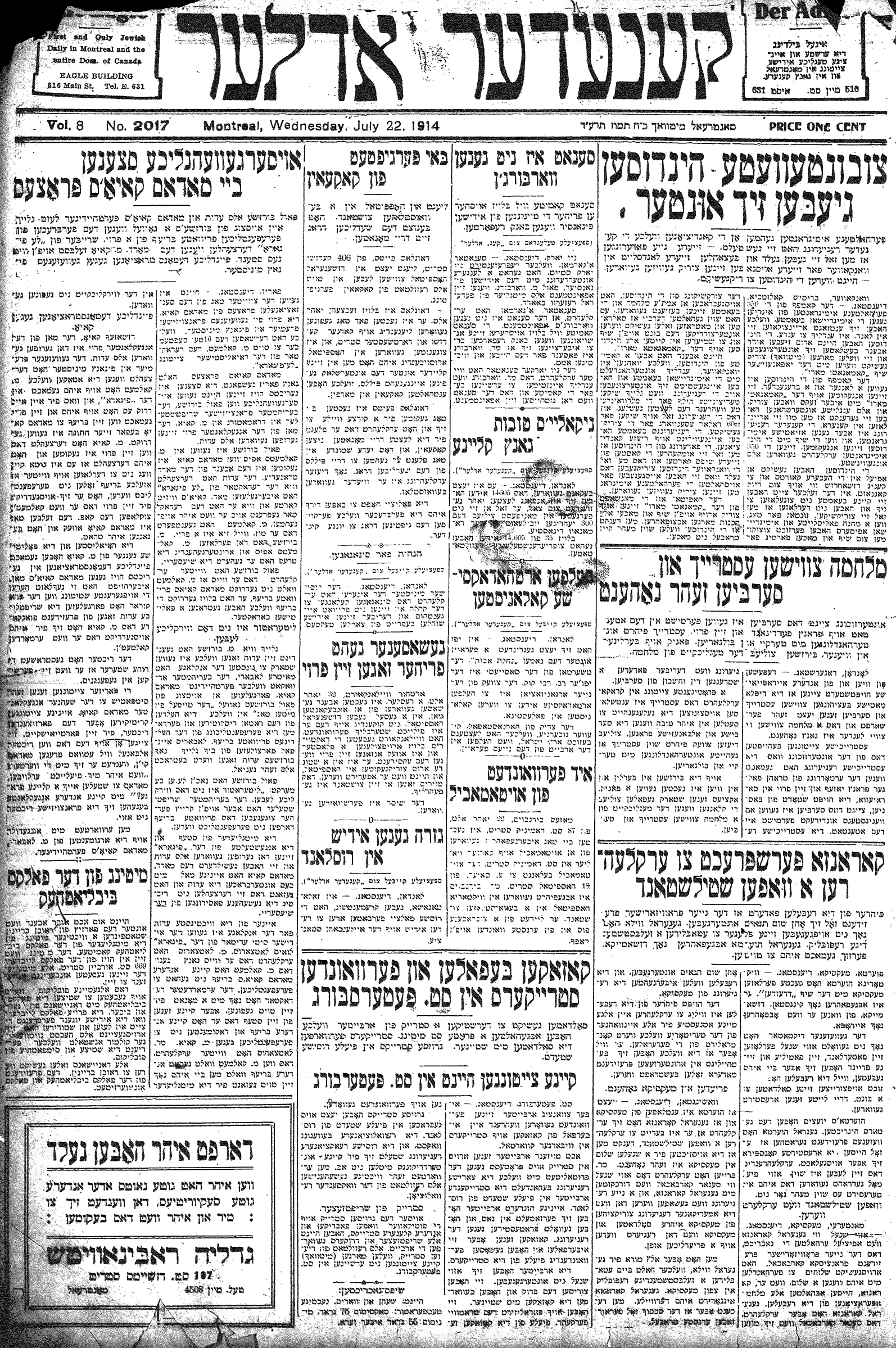
- The 22 July 1914 front page of the Keneder Adler
- Founder: Hirsch Wolofsky
- Launched: August 30, 1907
- Ceased publication: 1977; 49 years ago
- Language: Yiddish
- Headquarters: Montreal, Quebec
- Country: Canada
- Sister newspapers: Canadian Jewish Chronicle

Der Keneder Adler (Yiddish: דער קענעדער אדלער, lit. 'The Canadian Eagle') (Note: Also transliterated as Der Keneder Odler.) was Canada's leading Yiddish newspaper from 1907 until 1977. Founded in Montreal by Hirsch Wolofsky, the Adler underpinned Yiddish cultural activity in the city for much of the 20th century.

== History ==
After losing his fruit store on St. Lawrence Boulevard to a fire, Hirsch Wolofsky founded the Eagle Publishing Company with the insurance money salvaged from the disaster. Within a month, the publishing company had established functional offices and housed Canada's first Yiddish linotype machine. The Keneder Adler published its first issue on 30 August 1907. While newspaper's status was precarious during its early years, appearing only biweekly after the fourth edition, the Adler began publishing daily as of October 1908.

The paper was funded by Mortimer B. Davis when it struggled again financially during the First World War. The Adler would have to pay Davis off after he sought to control the Keneder Adler's editorial policy. In 1918, the Adler published its edition of the Babylonian Talmud, which became known as the Montrealer Shas ('The Montreal Talmud') and raised the newspaper's prestige.

The Adler served as a literary forum for Montreal's emerging Yiddish intelligentsia, as both a promoter of Yiddish literature and culture (through the efforts of J. I. Segal, in particular) and as a book publisher and distributor. A. A. Roback served as editor of Der Keneder Adler from 1908 to 1912, and Reuben Brainin as editor from 1912 to 1915, before departing for New York after a disagreement with Wolofsky. A. M. Klein maintained close ties with the paper, and authored the Adler's English page from 1938 to 1941. Israel Medres's regular columns, "Di vokh in kanade" ('This Week in Canada') and "Bilder in gerikht-zal" ('Pictures in a Courtroom'), presented readers with accessible discussions of contemporary political and legal matters.

After Wolofksy's death in 1949, the Adler was run by his son Max. The newspaper ceased publication in 1977, after unsuccessful reincarnations as a weekly and as a bilingual English–Yiddish publication.
