= Abraham Aaron Roback =

Psychologist (1890–1965)

Abraham Aaron Roback (June 19, 1890 – June 7, 1965) was a Jewish American psychologist and promoter of Yiddish.

== Biography ==
Roback was born in Goniondz, Russian Empire (now Poland). He was the youngest of four children to Isaac Roback and Leba Rahver. The family emigrated to Montreal in 1892, where he attended public schools. He graduated from McGill University in 1912, having studied philosophy with J.W.A. Hickson and experimental psychology with William Dunlop Tait. He studied for a Ph.D. under Hugo Münsterberg at Harvard University, where he later taught for several years. He also taught at the University of Pittsburgh, Northeastern University, Clark University and Massachusetts Institute of Technology.

Roback built a 10,000 volume Yiddish library for Harvard, and introduced the first US academic course in Yiddish literature in 1929 for the Massachusetts University Extension. He died in Cambridge, Massachusetts on June 7, 1965.

== Works ==
- Jewish Influence in Modern Thought (1929)
