= Abraham Rhinewine =

Canadian journalist

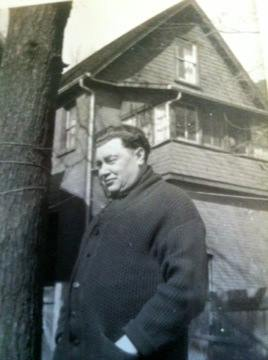
Abraham Rhinewine c. 1930

Abraham Rhinewine (1887–1932) was a Polish-born, Canadian-Jewish editor, publisher and author, among the most prominent Jewish journalists in Canada during his time. He was raised as an Orthodox Jew in Mezhirech (Miedzyrzec), Poland and trained to be a rabbi, but at the age of 15, he became a socialist and, after attempting to unionize his father's factory, was sent to England to continue his secular education. He later settled in North America, where he was to work briefly and unsuccessfully in the millinery industry in New York City. He then settled in Toronto where he began his brief career as a journalist and scholar. He is the author of several books in Yiddish as well as English, as well as many journalistic articles in these languages, and was publisher and editor-in-chief of the Hebrew Journal (Der Yidisher Zshurnal), a key Jewish newspaper in Toronto. Although he did not possess an advanced degree apart from a rabbinical certification from Poland and coursework from McMaster University (at that time in Toronto), he taught courses in Judaism at the University of Toronto and was well regarded as a secular scholar. He was politically active as a Jew and passionately advocated the Zionist cause for a Jewish state in Palestine. Following an unfortunate ouster from his position at the newspaper, he died May 19, 1932, at age 44, of complications from diabetes.

== Publications ==
English-language books:

- "Looking Back a Century: on the Centennial of Jewish Political Equality in Canada" revised and enlarged by Isidore Goldstick, Kraft Press, Toronto 1932

Yiddish-language books:

- "Yidishe Shrayber in Kanade [Jewish Writers in Canada]", publisher unknown, 1920
- "Erets Yisroel in Yidishen Leben un Literatur [The Land of Israel in Jewish Life and Literature]", Farlag Kanada, Toronto 1921
- "Kanade--ihr Geshikhte un Entviklung [Canada--its History and Development]", Kanade, Toronto 1923
- "Der Yid in Kanada: fun der frantzoyzisher periyode biz der moderner tzayt. [The Jew in Canada]", Farlag Kanada, Toronto 1925
