= Birju Dattani =

Canadian lawyer and human rights professional

Birju Dattani is a Canadian lawyer and human rights professional who is a senior fellow at the Centre for Free Expression at Toronto Metropolitan University. Dattani was previously appointed as Chief Commissioner of the Canadian Human Rights Commission in 2024. He was forced to resign before starting his role due to accusations of antisemitism, although an investigation by a third-party law firm found no evidence of antisemitism.

== Early life and education ==
Dattani was born in Calgary, Alberta, to parents who were refugees from Uganda. He later attended the University of Wales and the London School of Economics.

== Career ==
Prior to his federal appointment, Dattani served as the executive director of the Yukon Human Rights Commission. He also worked as Director of Human Rights and Conflict Resolution at Centennial College and worked as Assistant Regional Director at the Alberta Human Rights Commission.

=== Appointment to Canadian Human Rights Commission and Resignation. ===
Dattani was appointed to become the first Muslim or racialized chief commissioner of the Canadian Human Rights Commission, with a term to begin August 8, 2024. However, pro-Israel organizations accused Dattani of antisemitism when he was a graduate student ten years ago using the alias Mujahid Dattani, prompting justice minister Arif Virani to order an independent law firm investigation.

In 2015, Dattani had appeared on an academic panel with a member of the Islamic fundamentalist group Hizb ut-Tahrir, which calls for the destruction of Israel and the establishment of an Islamic caliphate. Dattani denied knowing that the other panellist was a member of the group and said "I wholeheartedly disagree with and condemn Hizb ut-Tahrir". The Centre for Israel and Jewish Affairs also alleged Dattani had made comparisons of Israel and Nazi Germany a decade ago using the Twitter account @mujahid_dattani. Dattani acknowledged sharing an article entitled “Palestinians are Warsaw Ghetto Prisoners of Today” but said that it was "for discussion as I was an academic studying such issues" and that he "did not agree with the comparison".

Virani received the report on August 7, 2024 and announced that Dattani would be on leave pending a review of the findings. The report found that there was no evidence Dattani "harboured or harbours any beliefs that would be characterized as anti-Semitic or that he has demonstrated any biases (conscious or unconscious) towards Jews or Israelis." It also stated that Dattani had demonstrated "a high degree of self-awareness and sensitivity to the current challenges faced by the Jewish community in Canada as well as a commitment to continue to learn about those challenges in the future." While Dattani had disclosed the name "Birju Muhahid" and "Birju M." to the government, the report found he had failed to disclose the alias "Mujahid Dattani" and that he did not "directly disclose" his past scholarship on Israel-Palestine. Virani sent the results to Dattani with a letter expressing concerns about his candour. On August 1, Dattani sent submissions to the Minister's office, which took issue with the report's findings on disclosure stating that he did disclose the name Mujahid and the investigators did not explain why they did not find his explanation that he had intended to include a comma between Birju and Mujahid to not be credible, as they are required to do when making an adverse finding. He also noted that he did not emphasize his past scholarship because he focused on his most relevant work experience. On August 12, Dattani said he "agreed to resign" from the role without having undertaken any duties and that he "remain[ed] a steadfast believer in the Commission’s work, mandate, and its importance to our democracy."

=== Career Following Resignation ===
After resigning from the Canadian Human Rights Commission, Dattani became a senior fellow at the Centre for Free Expression at Toronto Metropolitan University.

=== Defamation Lawsuits ===
In February 2025, Dattani filed defamation lawsuits against Conservative Party of Canada deputy leader Melissa Lantsman, right-wing commentator Ezra Levant, and the Centre for Israel and Jewish Affairs alleging they mischaracterized him as antisemitic and connected to terrorism even after the independent third party investigation found these allegations to be unfounded. His fundraising project for the lawsuits fell short as he failed to raise more than a quarter of his aim.
