= Faubourg Saint-Laurent =

- Neighbourhood
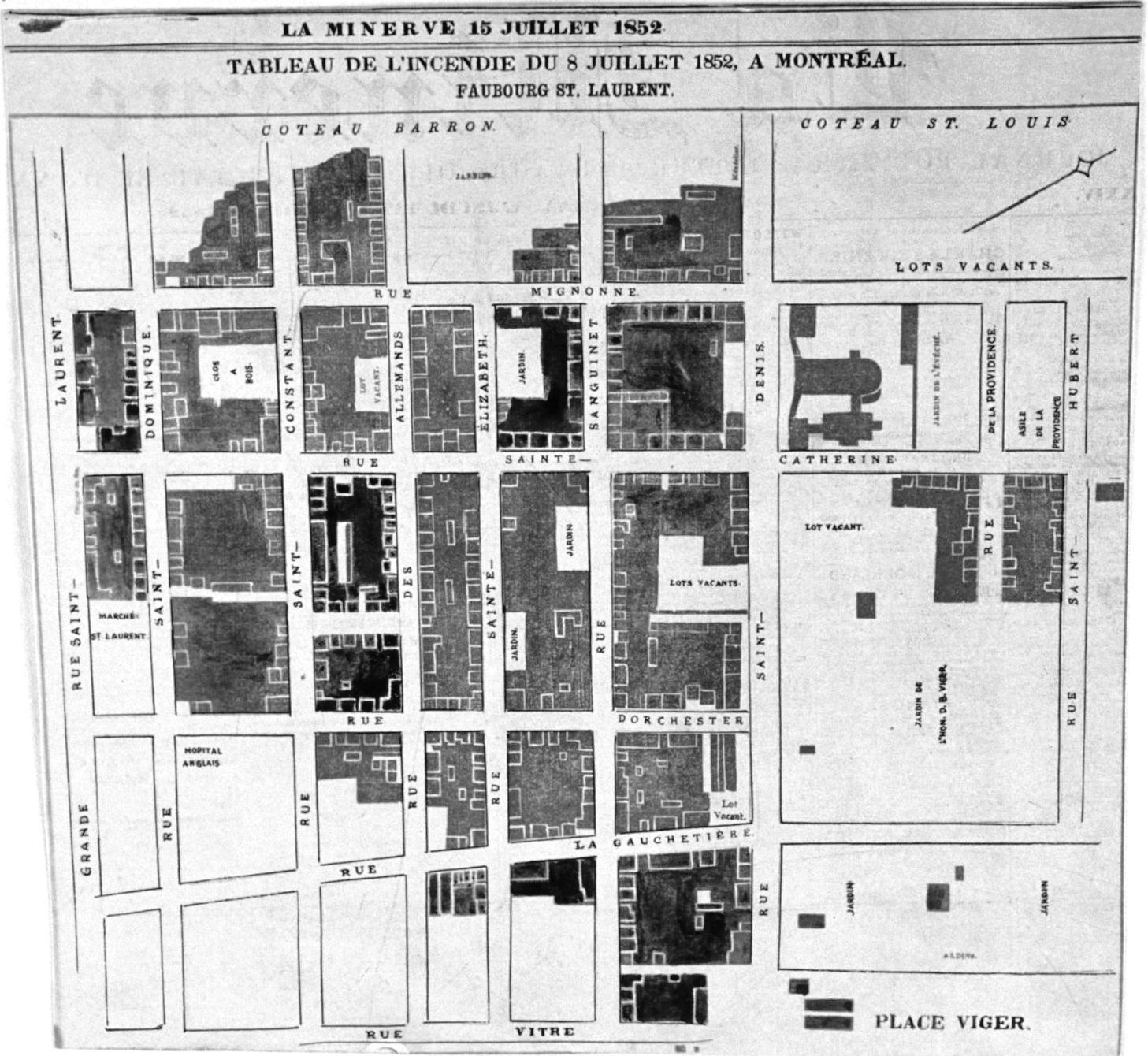

- Location of Faubourg Saint-Laurent in Montreal
- Coordinates: 45°30′37″N 73°33′37″W
- Country: Canada
- Province: Quebec
- City: Montreal
- Borough: Ville-Marie
- Postal code: H2L
- Area codes: 514, 438

Le Faubourg Saint-Laurent (French pronunciation: [lə fobuʁ sɛ̃ lɔʁɑ̃]) is a neighbourhood in Montreal, Quebec, Canada. It is situated in the borough of Ville-Marie. It developed as a faubourg east of the Saint-Laurent Boulevard (which led to the parish of Saint-Laurent), north of the fortified city. It is limited on the east by Saint Denis Street, on the south by Saint Antoine Street, on the West by Saint Laurent Boulevard, on the north by René Lévesque Boulevard. Today, the Urban Development Corporation of Faubourg Saint-Laurent is a non-profit organization that brings together retailers and institutions in the field of health, education and culture.
