= Esther Segal =

Canadian Yiddish-language poet (1895–1974)

Esther Segal (Yiddish: אסתּר סיגאַל; 1895–1974) was a Canadian Yiddish-language poet born in Ukraine.

Segal was born in Slobkovitz, the daughter of a cantor and part of a Hasidic family of seven children that also included her brother, the poet Jacob Isaac Segal. Following her father's death, throughout the 1900s and 1910s, the family gradually settled in Montreal, where her mother's sisters lived. Segal herself immigrated in 1909. She received education in a cheder in Ukraine and attended night school in Montreal, as well as the Jewish Teacher’s Seminary in New York City.

She married the poet A.S. Shkolnikov and they had a daughter, Mashe.

She published poetry beginning in 1922 in the Yiddish literary journal 1922 in Epokhe ("Epoch"). She published frequently in journals and anthologies, including Yidishe dikhterins: Antologye (Yiddish poetesses: An anthology, edited by Ezra Korman). She only published a single volume of poetry, Lider ("Poems", 1928).

Shkolnikov died in 1962 and she followed Mashe to Israel in 1965.
