= J. I. Segal =

Canadian Yiddish poet and journalist (1896-1954)

- י.י. סיגאַל
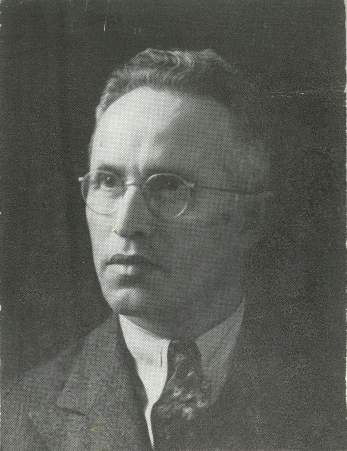
- Portrait of J. I. Segal, c. 1944
- Born: Yaakov Yitzchak Skolar; 1896; Slobkovitz, Podolia, Russian Empire
- Died: March 7, 1954 (aged 57–58); Montreal, Quebec, Canada
- Resting place: Baron de Hirsch Cemetery
- Relatives: Esther Segal (sister)
- Writing career
- Language: Yiddish
- Literary movement: Modernism

J. I. Segal (Yiddish: י.י. סיגאַל, Yud Yud Sigal) (1896 – March 7, 1954), born Yaakov Yitzchak Skolar, was a Canadian Yiddish poet and journalist. He was a pioneer in the creation of Canadian Yiddish literary journals, and was the foremost proponent of literary modernism in Yiddish Canada. His lyric poetry combines religious and folk tradition, modernist American literary practice, and Canadian landscape and atmosphere.

== Biography ==
J. I. Segal was born Yaakov Yitzchak Skolar in 1896 in Slobkovitz, Podolia in the Russian Empire (now Solobkovtsy, Ukraine), the second youngest of seven children. He moved to the village of Koritz with his family at the age of three, after the death of his father.

Segal immigrated to Montreal in 1911. Upon arriving in Canada, he found work as a tailor in the garment industry, and then later as a teacher at the Jewish People's School. By 1915 he had begun submitting poetry to the Keneder Adler. In 1918 he published his first collection of poetry, Fun Mayn Velt ("From My World"), which brought him immediate recognition, not only in Canada but in New York City and Poland.

In 1923, Segal and his family relocated to New York, where he joined Di Yunge poet Mani Leib's shoemaker collective. After publishing two collections of poetry, Segal returned to Montreal in 1928 after the death of his young daughter, Tsharna, whom he often addresses in later poems. From 1941 until his death he was co-editor of the literary pages of the Keneder Adler along with Melech Ravitch.

Segal was a prolific poet and the author of twelve volumes of poetry, among them, Sefer Idish ("The Book of Yiddish"), the last collection published in his lifetime, and Letste Lider ("Last Poems"), published posthumously.

Since 1969, the Jewish Public Library of Montreal has awarded literary and translation prizes in his honor. The J. I. Segal Awards include bi-annual awards for the Best Quebec Book on a Jewish Theme, a writing award for writing in Yiddish, and an award for a Translation for a Book on a Jewish Theme. Past winners have included Leonard Cohen, Naim Kattan and Chava Rosenfarb. The 2022 awards will be announced in December, 2022.
