= Canadian Jewish Congress =

1919–2011 advocacy group

- Abbreviation: CJC
- Formation: 1919
- Dissolved: 2011; 15 years ago
- Type: Non-governmental organization
- Headquarters: Montreal, Quebec (1919–1999); Ottawa, Ontario (1999–2011)
- Official language: English, French, Yiddish
- Parent organization: Canadian Council for Israel and Jewish Advocacy (2007–2011)
- Affiliations: World Jewish Congress

The Canadian Jewish Congress (CJC; French: Congrès juif canadien; Yiddish: קאַנאַדער ײִדישער קאָנגרעס; Hebrew: הקונגרס היהודי הקנדי) was, for more than ninety years, the main advocacy group for the Jewish community in Canada. Regarded by many as the "Parliament of Canadian Jewry," the Congress was at the forefront of the struggle for human rights, equality, immigration reform and civil rights in Canada.

The organization disbanded in July 2011 following a reorganization of the Centre for Israel and Jewish Affairs, which had first taken a role in the governance and operation of the CJC in 2007.

== History ==
=== Founding and early history ===
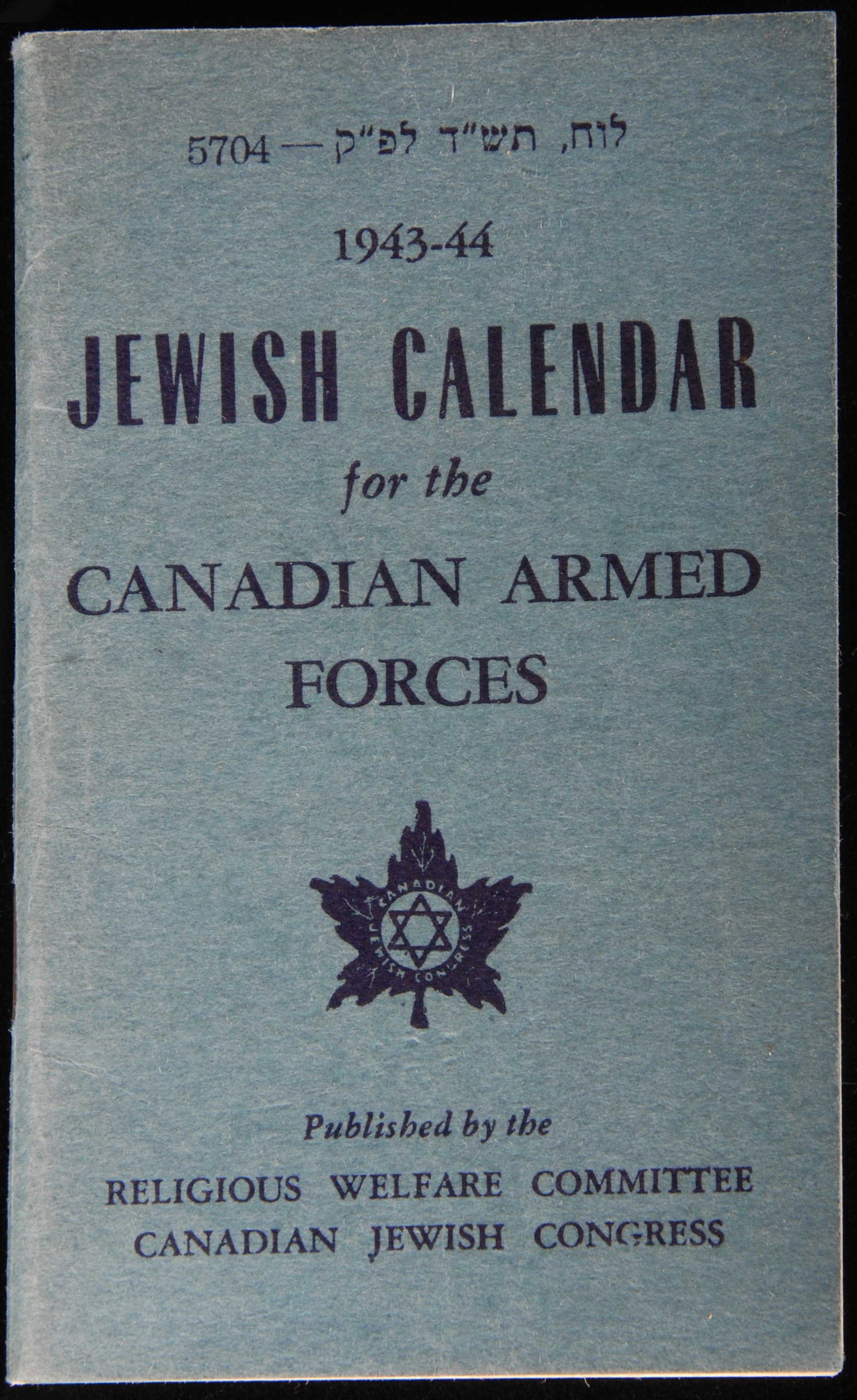
Jewish calendar for the Canadian Armed Forces in World War II, published by the Canadian Jewish Congress

The immediate predecessor to the CJC was formed in 1915 by the Montreal chapter of Poalei Zion, a working class Labour Zionist organization. They were soon joined by thirteen other organizations, mostly other chapters of Poalei Zion and the Arbeiter Ring, in forming the Canadian Jewish Alliance. The organization, composed of elected officials, set out to represent all of Canadian Jewry on its major political, national and international affairs. It also aimed to respond to problems arising from the First World War, specifically the oppression of Jews overseas, the immigration of Jewish refugees, and Britain's promises to create a Jewish state.

In 1919, over 25,000 Jews from across Canada voted for delegates to the first convention of the CJC held in Montreal that March. Groups including the Canadian Federation of Zionist Societies, Poalei Zion, Mizrachi, and the Arbeiter Ring were present at the convention. While there, they were addressed by the Solicitor General of Canada, and were entertained at Montreal City Hall, where a large Zionist flag was draped over the Mayor's chair. The main decision at that meeting was the founding of the Jewish Immigrant Aid Society to assist Jewish settlers and refugees in Canada. They also passed motions expressing the Jewish community's loyalty to Canada and others declaring their support for the Balfour Declaration. The convention elected Lyon Cohen, former President of the Montreal Clothing Manufacturers Union, as their President.

Despite this auspicious start, the CJC fell into abeyance and was inactive until 1934, due to lack of leadership and funding. With the rise in antisemitism and restricted immigration policies in the 1930s, the CJC re-convened in 1934 and held the Congress' second plenum in Toronto in January. Cohen's friend and close colleague, Samuel William Jacobs, a prominent Jewish leader and Member of Parliament, became the revived Congress' first president.

In 1938, the Canadian Jewish Congress partnered with B'nai Brith Canada to create the Joint Public Relations Committee, with the goal of developing a strategy to combat discrimination and find allies within other minority groups.

=== Post–World War II ===
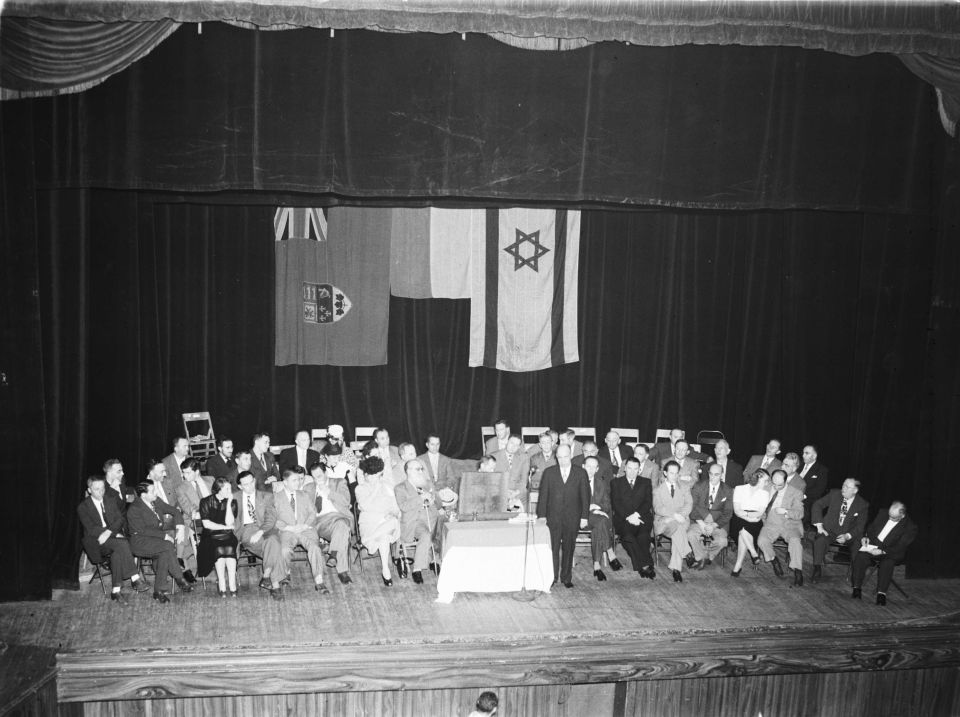
Meeting of the Canadian Jewish Congress in 1946

The CJC was active before and during World War II in lobbying the government (with limited success) to open the borders to Jewish refugees fleeing Europe. After the war, over 1,100 child Holocaust survivors immigrated to Canada in the War Orphans Project, a refugee resettlement program administered by the CJC. The CJC also organized relief aid for Holocaust survivors who were being detained in Displaced Persons camps. Along with the efforts of Senator Arthur Roebuck and Rabbi Avraham Aharon Price, the CJC helped obtain the release of young, Jewish refugees from internment camps, bringing them to study in Toronto.

The Congress' dominant figure from 1939 to 1962 was its president, Samuel Bronfman who was elected president following Jacobs' death in 1938. During the Cold War at Bronfman's urging, the CJC expelled the United Jewish People's Order and other communist Jewish organizations in 1951. At the time, the UJPO was one of the largest Jewish fraternal organizations in Canada. It would not be readmitted to the CJC until 1995.

In 1967, the CJC gifted approximately 7,000 volumes of rare Judaica to the National Library on behalf of the Canadian Jewish community in honour of the Canadian Centennial.

One of the initiatives sponsored by the CJC was the International Jewish Correspondence, founded in 1978, whose goal was to link Jews around the world as pen-pals. With the rise of the internet in the 1990s, IJC became less active and had folded by 2002. The organization also provided addresses for Jews living in Arab and Soviet Bloc countries as well as Jewish prisoners who were put in contact with others in the same situation. Jewish people from nearly 20 countries participated in the initiative, including those with declining Jewish populations such as Estonia, Morocco and Zimbabwe.

=== Later history and disbandment ===
In its later decades, the CJC launched campaigns to pressure the Soviet Union to allow Jewish emigration, to pressure the Canadian government to prosecute Nazi war criminals who had settled in Canada, and to enact and use hate crimes legislation against antisemites and Holocaust deniers such as Ernst Zündel. The CJC actively opposed Quebec separatism in the 1990s and formed a national coalition of Canada's Italian, Greek and Jewish communities during the debate on the Charlottetown Accord. The CJC also worked to promote tolerance and understanding between religious and ethnic groups, promote anti-racist work and other campaigns.

In 2006, the Ontario branch of the CJC challenged the inclusion of the book "Three Wishes: Palestinian and Israeli Children Speak" by Canadian Author Deborah Ellis in Schools due to glorification of suicide bombing and misrepresenting Israelis, these challenges were disputed but ultimately resulted in the restriction of the book from 5 school boards within Canada, with school libraries refusing the book to students who requested it. Protests from freedom to read organisations like the Ontario Library Association ultimately failed.

The CJC introduced significant changes to its internal organization in June 2007. The previous system of electing representatives to the Board of Directors was discarded, and a new system was introduced wherein Board members were chosen by indirect elections from "regional Congress representatives" and "delegates from Jewish federations." Congress CEO Bernie Farber supported the change, arguing it would streamline a complicated process. Others argued that the new system would give disproportionate power to the Canadian Council for Israel and Jewish Advocacy. One individual, described by The Canadian Jewish News as a "close observer of Congress", argued that CIJA was "stacking the deck" in a bid to take over the CJC.

In 2011, the renamed Centre for Israel and Jewish Affairs (CIJA) assumed the functions of the CJC after an 18-month restructuring process in which the functions of the Canadian Jewish Congress, the Canada-Israel Committee, the Quebec-Israel Committee, National Jewish Campus Life and the University Outreach Committee were consolidated, a move that left the Jewish community divided. On 1 July 2011 the CJC posted a message on its website declaring that it had halted its activities and that its functions would be assumed by CIJA.

== Presidents ==
- Lyon Cohen: 1919–1934
- Samuel William Jacobs: 1934–1938
- Samuel Bronfman: 1939–1962
- Michael Garber: 1962–1968
- Monroe Abbey: 1968–1971
- Sol Kanee: 1971–1974
- Sydney Harris: 1974–1977
- Rabbi W. Gunther Plaut: 1977–1980
- Irwin Cotler: 1980–1983
- Milton E. Harris: 1983–1986
- Dorothy Reitman: 1986–1989
- Les Scheininger: 1989–1992
- Irving Abella: 1992–1995
- Goldie Hershon: 1995–1998
- Moshe Ronen: 1998–2001
- Keith M. Landy: 2001–2004
- Ed Morgan: 2004–2007
- Reuven Bulka and Sylvain Abitbol: 2007–2009
- Mark Freiman: 2009–2011

== See also ==
- Atlantic Jewish Council
