= Canadian Jewish Review =

Canadian weekly newspaper

- Type: weekly newspaper
- Founded: 1921
- Ceased publication: 1966
- Language: English
- Country: Canada

The Canadian Jewish Review was a Canadian weekly newspaper, published in English between 1921 and 1966. The Canadian Jewish Review was purchased by the Canadian Jewish Chronicle in December 1966 and merged to become the Canadian Jewish Chronicle Review with Chronicle managing editor David Novek named editor and publisher of the merged weekly and Chronicle editor-in-chief Max Malemet taking the same role at the Chronicle Review.

The Chronicle Review ceased publication in 1976.

== History ==
The Canadian Jewish Review was founded in 1921 in Toronto by George and Florence Cohen (née Freelander) as a weekly newspaper, publishing in English. An office in Montreal was opened in 1929 and a Montreal edition commenced publication, also in English. The motivation to establish a Montreal edition was Quebec permitted the commercial advertising of liquor, while Ontario did not.

The paper was initially regarded as being more of a review of social events than a paper containing serious social and political commentary. This social focus is now regarded as making The Canadian Jewish Review an important genealogical source. Much of its social and political commentary was by Rabbi Maurice Eisendrath (1902–1973), spiritual leader of Toronto's Holy Blossom Temple and assistant contributing editor of the paper. Rabbi Eisendrath, who came to Holy Blossom Temple in 1929, contributed a weekly column to The Canadian Jewish Review. His views, opposing Zionism and his use of his weekly column in The Canadian Jewish Review to express these views, were a source of controversy. Rose Dunkelman (1889–1949), wife of David Dunkelman (1880–1978), one of Canada's most successful industrialists and retailers, co-founded a competing newspaper, The Jewish Standard, with a specific objective of countering the views of Eisendrath.

A substantially complete collection of the Canadian Jewish Review, donated by Simon Fraser University Library, has been digitalized and is searchable via the Multicultural Canada project.
