= Sylvain Abitbol =

Canadian engineer

Sylvain Abitbol is an engineer and entrepreneur in the telecommunications industry as CEO of NHC Communications Inc but is best known as an activist in Jewish affairs and was co-president of the Canadian Jewish Congress from 2007 to 2011.

Abitbol graduated from Montreal's Ecole Polytechnique in 1973 with a degree in Industrial and Mechanical Engineering.

He was employed by Xerox for six years and received training in telecommunications at the company's training centre in El Segundo, California.

Abitbol is a member of Montreal's Sephardic Jewish community and became president of Montreal's Federation CJA in 2004. His family immigrated to Montreal from Morocco after the Six-Day War in 1967.
