= Results of the 1962 Canadian federal election =

1962 Canadian federal election
← 1958	June 18, 1962	1963 →
Party	Leader	Vote %	Seats	+/–
Progressive Conservative	John Diefenbaker	37.22	116	−92
Liberal	Lester B. Pearson	36.97	99	+51
Social Credit	Robert N. Thompson	11.62	30	+30
New Democratic	Tommy Douglas	13.57	19	+11
Liberal–Labour	no leader	0.20	1	0
This lists parties that won seats. See the complete results below.
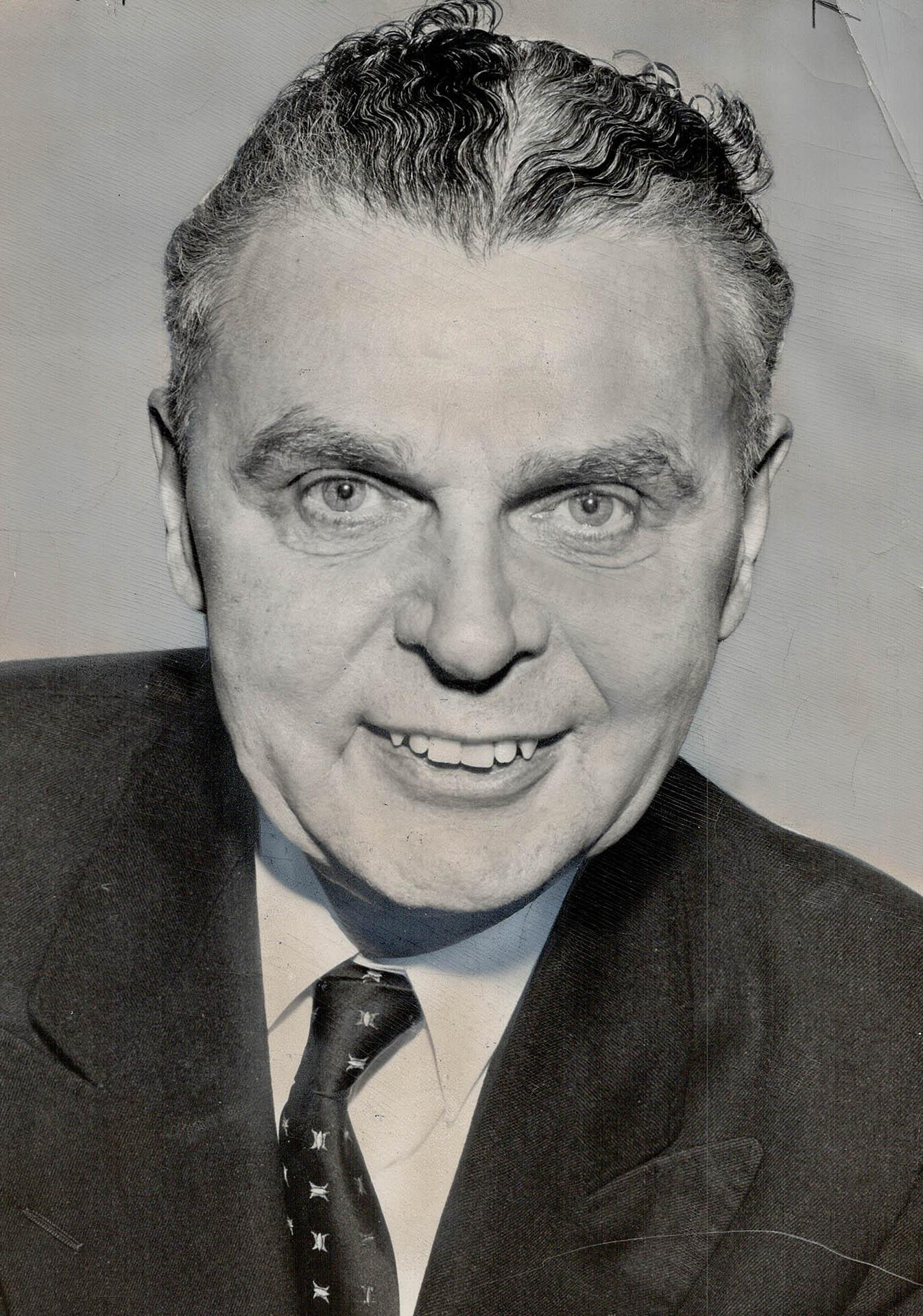

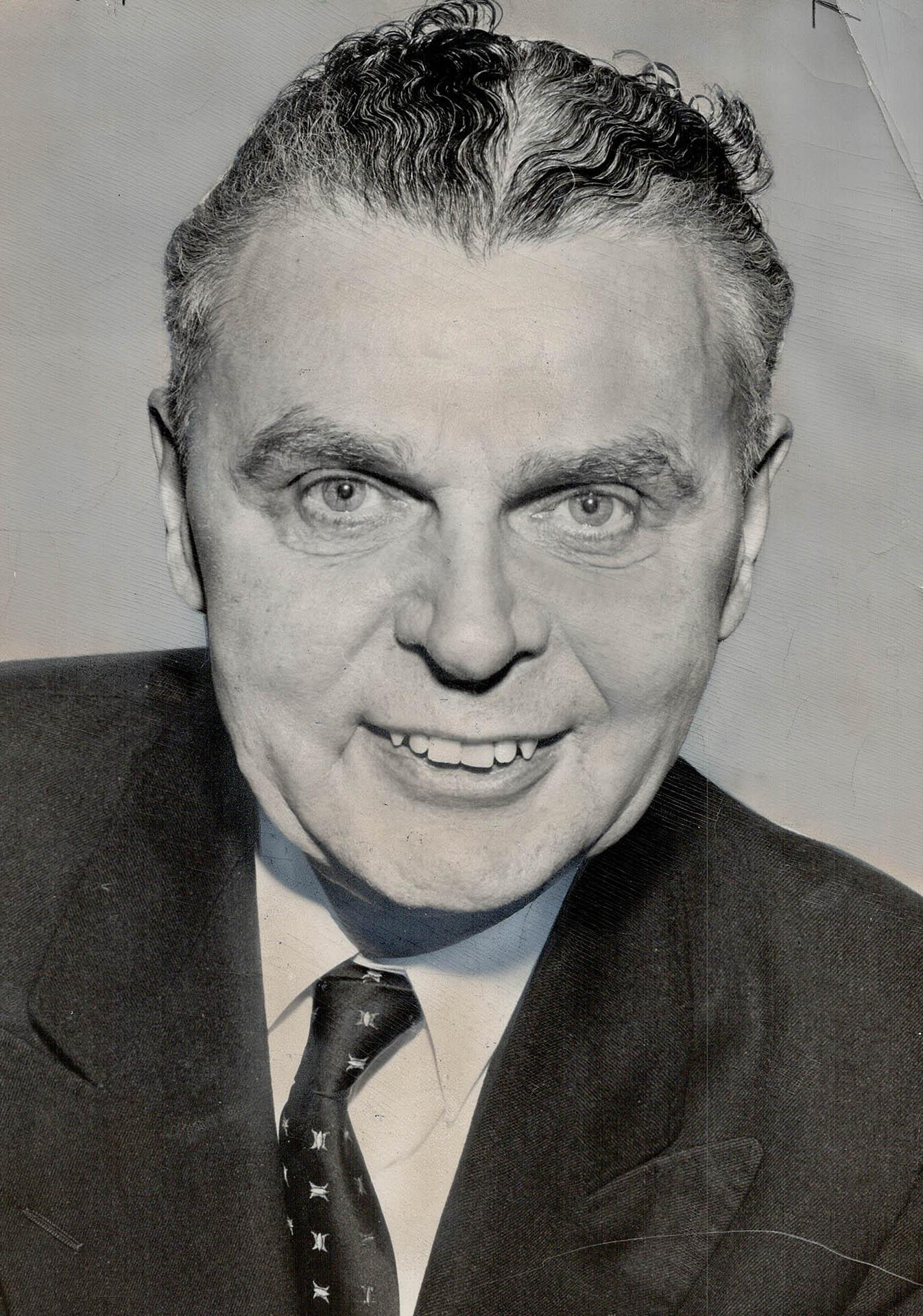
Prime Minister before	Prime Minister after
John Diefenbaker; Progressive Conservative	John Diefenbaker; Progressive Conservative

== Results by Province and Territory ==
=== Alberta ===
Results in Alberta
Party	Seats	Second	Third	Fourth	Fifth	Sixth	Votes	%	+/-
Progressive Conservative	15	2	0	0	0	0	214,699	42.77	
Social Credit	2	12	3	0	0	0	146,662	29.22	
Liberals	0	3	13	1	0	0	97,322	19.39	
NDP	0	0	1	16	0	0	42,305	8.43	
Independent	0	0	0	0	1	0	497	0.1	
Independent Liberal	0	0	0	0	1	0	311	0.06	
All Canadian Party	0	0	0	0	0	1	189	0.04	
Total	17						501,985	100.0	

=== British Columbia ===
Results in British Columbia
Party	Seats	Second	Third	Fourth	Fifth	Votes	%	+/-
NDP	10	4	6	2	0	212,035	30.9	
Liberals	4	12	2	3	0	187,438	27.32	
Progressive Conservative	6	6	10	0	0	187,389	27.31	
Social Credit	2	0	4	16	0	97,396	14.19	
Communist	0	0	0	0	3	1,707	0.25	
Independent	0	0	0	0	1	224	0.03	
Total	22					686,189	100.0	

=== Manitoba ===
Results in Manitoba
Party	Seats	Second	Third	Fourth	Fifth	Votes	%	+/-
Progressive Conservative	11	2	1	0	0	161,824	41.56	
Liberals	1	12	1	0	0	121,041	31.09	
NDP	2	0	8	4	0	76,514	19.65	
Social Credit	0	0	4	9	0	26,662	6.85	
Communist	0	0	0	0	2	2,153	0.55	
Independent	0	0	0	0	1	1,144	0.29	
Total	14					389,338	100.0	

=== New Brunswick ===
Results in New Brunswick
Party	Seats	Second	Third	Fourth	Votes	%	+/-
Progressive Conservative	4	6	0	0	115,973	46.48	
Liberals	6	4	0	0	110,850	44.43	
NDP	0	0	5	2	13,220	5.3	
Social Credit	0	0	4	4	9,016	3.61	
Independent Liberal	0	0	0	1	441	0.18	
Total	10				249,500	100.0	

=== Newfoundland and Labrador ===
Results in Newfoundland and Labrador
Party	Seats	Second	Third	Fourth	Votes	%	+/-
Liberals	6	1	0	0	90,896	59.01	
Progressive Conservative	1	6	0	0	55,396	35.96	
NDP	0	0	4	0	7,590	4.93	
Social Credit	0	0	0	1	158	0.1	
Total	7				154,040	100.0	

=== Northwest Territories ===
Results in Northwest Territories
Party	Seats	Second	Third	Votes	%	+/-
Liberals	1	0	0	3,842	46.24	
Progressive Conservative	0	1	0	3,519	42.35	
Independent	0	0	1	948	11.41	
Total	1			8,309	100.0	

=== Nova Scotia ===
Results in Nova Scotia
Party	Seats	Second	Third	Fourth	Fifth	Sixth	Votes	%	+/-
Progressive Conservative	9	3	0	0	0	0	198,902	47.26	
Liberals	2	8	2	0	0	0	178,520	42.42	
NDP	1	0	8	2	1	0	39,689	9.43	
Social Credit	0	0	1	4	0	1	3,353	0.8	
Unknown	0	0	0	1	0	0	411	0.1	
Total	12						420,875	100.0	

=== Ontario ===
Results in Ontario
Party	Seats	Second	Third	Fourth	Fifth	Sixth	Votes	%	+/-
Liberals	43	37	4	0	0	0	1,106,977	41.04	
Progressive Conservative	35	44	6	0	0	0	1,056,055	39.15	
NDP	6	4	65	5	0	0	464,360	17.22	
Social Credit	0	0	9	56	3	1	49,450	1.83	
Liberal-Labour	1	0	0	0	0	0	15,412	0.57	
Independent	0	0	1	1	2	0	2,777	0.1	
Communist	0	0	0	4	1	0	1,836	0.07	
Unknown	0	0	0	1	0	0	284	0.01	
Cooperative Builders of Canada	0	0	0	0	1	0	261	0.01	
Total	85						2,697,412	100.0	

=== Prince Edward Island ===
Results in Prince Edward Island
Party	Seats	Second	Third	Fourth	Fifth	Votes	%	+/-
Progressive Conservative	4	0	0	0	0	37,388	51.25	
Liberals	0	3	1	0	0	31,603	43.32	
NDP	0	0	2	1	1	3,802	5.21	
Social Credit	0	0	0	1	0	153	0.21	
Total	4					72,946	100.0	

=== Quebec ===
Results in Quebec
Party	Seats	Second	Third	Fourth	Fifth	Sixth	Votes	%	+/-
Liberals	35	35	5	0	0	0	818,760	39.18	
Progressive Conservative	14	35	26	0	0	0	617,762	29.56	
Social Credit	26	5	25	17	2	0	542,433	25.95	
NDP	0	0	18	20	2	0	91,795	4.39	
Independent Liberal	0	0	0	3	1	1	9,654	0.46	
Independent	0	0	0	2	2	0	3,442	0.16	
Independent Progressive Conservative	0	0	0	0	2	2	2,713	0.13	
Candidat libéral des électeurs	0	0	1	0	0	0	1,836	0.09	
Unknown	0	0	0	0	1	0	636	0.03	
Capital Familial	0	0	0	0	1	0	393	0.02	
Communist	0	0	0	0	1	0	347	0.02	
Ouvrier indépendant	0	0	0	0	1	0	152	0.01	
Total	75						2,089,923	100.0	

=== Saskatchewan ===
Results in Saskatchewan
Party	Seats	Second	Third	Fourth	Fifth	Votes	%	+/-
Progressive Conservative	16	1	0	0	0	213,385	50.39	
Liberals	1	8	8	0	0	96,676	22.83	
NDP	0	8	9	0	0	93,444	22.07	
Social Credit	0	0	0	15	0	19,648	4.64	
Communist	0	0	0	0	1	317	0.07	
Total	17					423,470	100.0	

=== Yukon ===
Results in Yukon
Party	Seats	Second	Votes	%	+/-
Progressive Conservative	1	0	3,250	54.95	
Liberals	0	1	2,664	45.05	
Total	1		5,914	100.0	
