= Results of the 1957 Canadian federal election =

Results of the 23rd Canadian federal election

1957 Canadian federal election
← 1953	June 10, 1957	1958 →
- Turnout: 74.1%
Party	Leader	Vote %	Seats	+/–
Progressive Conservative	John Diefenbaker	38.50%	112	+61
Liberal	Louis St. Laurent	40.45%	105	−64
Co-operative Commonwealth	Major James Coldwell	10.59%	25	+2
Social Credit	Solon Earl Low	6.54%	19	+4
This lists parties that won seats. See the complete results below.
Prime Minister before	Prime Minister after
Louis St. Laurent; Liberal	John Diefenbaker; Progressive Conservative

== Results by Province ==
=== Alberta ===
Results in Alberta
Party	Seats	Second	Third	Fourth	Fifth	Votes	%	+/-
Social Credit	13	2	2			161,697	37.81	
Liberals	1	11	5			119,190	27.87	
Progressive Conservative	3	4	9	1		118,225	27.65	
CCF			1	14		27,127	6.34	
Labor-Progressive					1	815	0.19	
Independent Social Credit					1	386	0.09	
Independent					1	212	0.05	
Total	17					427,652	100.0	

=== British Columbia ===
Results in British Columbia
Party	Seats	Second	Third	Fourth	Fifth	Votes	%	+/-
Progressive Conservative	7	7	7	1		192,988	32.62	
Social Credit	6	6	8	1		143,145	24.2	
CCF	7	2	4	9		131,873	22.29	
Liberals	2	7	3	10		121,301	20.51	
Labor-Progressive					2	1,345	0.23	
Canadian Democrat					1	628	0.11	
Independent					1	259	0.04	
Total	22					591,539	100.0	

=== Manitoba ===
Results in Manitoba
Party	Seats	Second	Third	Fourth	Fifth	Votes	%	+/-
Progressive Conservative	8	2	3	1		124,867	35.87	
Liberals	1	10	3			90,880	26.11	
CCF	5	1	2	6		82,398	23.67	
Social Credit		1	6	7		45,803	13.16	
Independent Liberal					2	2,378	0.68	
Labor-Progressive					1	1,579	0.45	
Independent					1	205	0.06	
Total	14					348,110	100.0	

=== New Brunswick ===
Results in New Brunswick
Party	Seats	Second	Third	Fourth	Votes	%	+/-
Progressive Conservative	5	5			114,060	48.71	
Liberals	5	5			112,518	48.05	
Independent			1		3,159	1.35	
Social Credit			2		2,420	1.03	
CCF			1	1	2,001	0.85	
Total	10				234,158	100.0	

=== Newfoundland and Labrador ===
Results in Newfoundland and Labrador
Party	Seats	Second	Third	Votes	%	+/-
Liberals	4	2	1	56,993	61.88	
Progressive Conservative	2	4		34,795	37.78	
CCF			1	321	0.35	
Total	6			92,109	100.0	

=== Northwest Territories ===
Results in Northwest Territories
Party	Seats	Second	Votes	%	+/-
Liberals	1		2,686	68.19	
Progressive Conservative		1	1,253	31.81	
Total	1		3,939	100.0	

=== Nova Scotia ===
Results in Nova Scotia
Party	Seats	Second	Third	Fourth	Fifth	Sixth	Votes	%	+/-
Progressive Conservative	9	3					197,676	50.41	
Liberals	2	8	1	1			176,891	45.11	
CCF			3	1	1	1	17,117	4.36	
Social Credit			1				473	0.12	
Total	11						392,157	100.0	

=== Ontario ===
Results in Ontario
Party	Seats	Second	Third	Fourth	Fifth	Votes	%	+/-
Progressive Conservative	61	21	3			1,105,236	48.75	
Liberals	20	61	3			830,307	36.62	
CCF	3	3	51	3		274,238	12.1	
Social Credit			13	24	2	36,067	1.59	
Liberal Labour Party	1					10,701	0.47	
Independent Liberal			1			5,414	0.24	
Independent Social Credit				1		2,351	0.1	
Labor-Progressive				2		1,432	0.06	
Independent				1		726	0.03	
Independent Progressive Conservative				1		342	0.02	
Liberal Conservative Coalition				1		252	0.01	
Total	85					2,267,066	100.0	

=== Prince Edward Island ===
Results in Prince Edward Island
Party	Seats	Second	Third	Fourth	Fifth	Votes	%	+/-
Progressive Conservative	3	1				34,965	52.34	
Liberals		2	1	1		31,162	46.64	
CCF			2		1	680	1.02	
Total	3					66,807	100.0	

=== Quebec ===
Results in Quebec
Party	Seats	Second	Third	Fourth	Fifth	Votes	%	+/-
Liberals	62	13				1,030,354	57.56	
Progressive Conservative	8	51	9			547,950	30.61	
Independent Liberal	2	4	12	5	1	85,674	4.79	
Independent	2	5	1	2		65,499	3.66	
CCF			14	6	2	31,780	1.78	
Independent Progressive Conservative	1	1	1	2		14,183	0.79	
Candidate of the Electors		1				8,129	0.45	
Social Credit			2	2		3,877	0.22	
Labor-Progressive			1	2		2,377	0.13	
Capital Familial			1			237	0.01	
Total	75					1,790,060	100.0	

=== Saskatchewan ===
Results in Saskatchewan
Party	Seats	Second	Third	Fourth	Fifth	Sixth	Votes	%	+/-
CCF	10	5	2				140,293	35.96	
Liberals	4	9	4				118,282	30.32	
Progressive Conservative	3	2	10	1			90,359	23.16	
Social Credit		1	1	14			40,830	10.47	
Labor-Progressive					1		212	0.05	
National Credit Control						1	122	0.03	
Total	17						390,098	100.0	

=== Yukon ===
Results in Yukon
Party	Seats	Second	Votes	%	+/-
Liberals	1		2,422	50.67	
Progressive Conservative		1	2,358	49.33	
Total	1		4,780	100.0	
