= 1953 Canadian federal election =

- August 10, 1953

265 seats in the House of Commons 133 seats needed for a majority
- Turnout: 67.5% (▼6.3 pp)
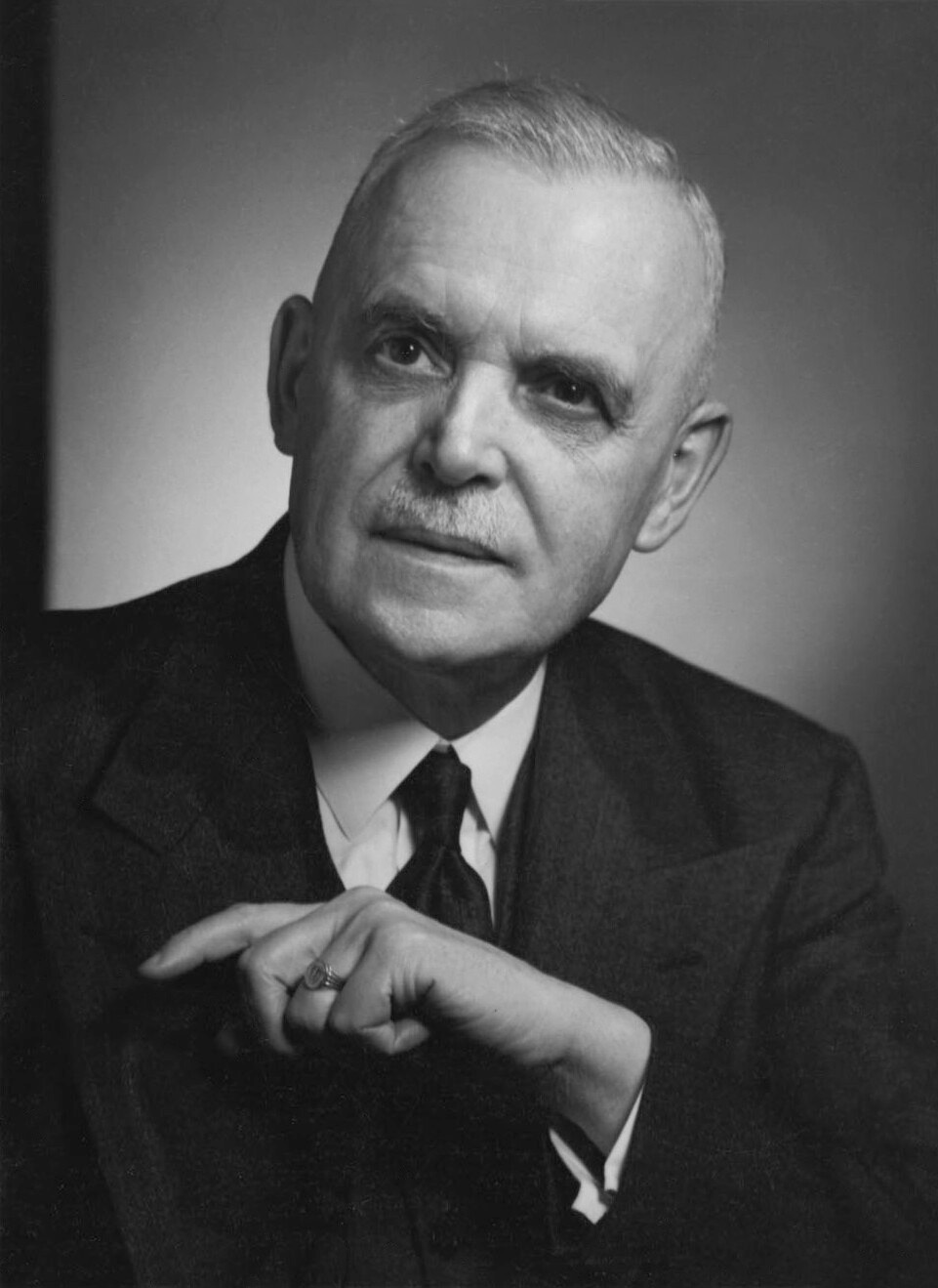

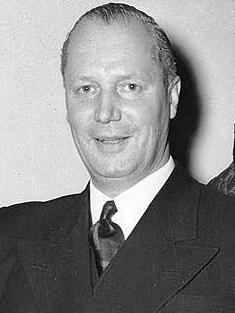

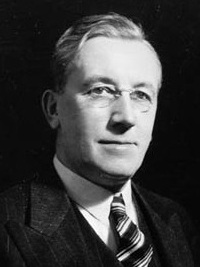

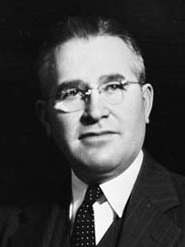
	First party	Second party
Leader	Louis St. Laurent	George A. Drew
Party	Liberal	Progressive Conservative
Leader since	August 7, 1948	October 2, 1948
Leader's seat	Quebec East	Carleton
Last election	191 seats, 49.15%	41 seats, 29.65%
Seats won	169	51
Seat change	▼22	▲10
Popular vote	2,731,633	1,749,579
Percentage	48.43%	31.02%
Swing	▼0.72 pp	▲1.37 pp
	Third party	Fourth party
Leader	Major James Coldwell	Solon Earl Low
Party	Co-operative Commonwealth	Social Credit
Leader since	March 22, 1942	April 6, 1944
Leader's seat	Rosetown—Biggar	Peace River
Last election	13 seats, 13.42%	10 seats, 2.31%
Seats won	23	15
Seat change	▲10	▲5
Popular vote	636,310	304,553
Percentage	11.28%	5.40%
Swing	▼2.14 pp	▲3.09 pp

- The Canadian parliament after the 1953 election
Prime Minister before election
Louis St. Laurent
Liberal
Prime Minister after election
Louis St. Laurent
Liberal

The 1953 Canadian federal election was held on August 10, 1953, to elect members of the House of Commons of Canada of the 22nd Parliament of Canada. Prime Minister Louis St. Laurent led his Liberal Party of Canada to its second consecutive majority government, although the party took less than half the votes cast and lost seats to the other parties.

The Progressive Conservative Party, led by former Premier of Ontario, George Drew, formed the official opposition. This election was a nadir for the party -- PCs did not win the most votes in any of the individual provinces or territories. This was not repeated again until 1993,

This was the last election until 1988 in which a party won back-to-back majorities. Liberals did not accomplish this again until 1997. This election was the last where Liberals won more seats in Alberta than the Conservatives (the largest right-of-centre party), until 1993.

== Overview ==
=== Liberal Party ===
Throughout the years since the previous federal election, St. Laurent had been an active and popular Prime Minister, increasing the country's autonomy from the United Kingdom, overseeing the construction of the Trans-Canada Highway, and introducing various welfare programmes. With the Liberals remaining well ahead in the polls, St. Laurent decided there was little to be gained by waiting out his whole mandate, and called an early federal election a year before his mandate was due to expire.

As with the previous election, the campaign was largely based around St. Laurent's personal image, and was light on any actual policies beyond a continuation of what his government had already been doing. While they would lose support in relatively equal measure to all the other three major parties, the majority that they had won four years earlier still held up, and delivered St. Laurent his second majority government.

=== Progressive Conservatives ===
While party leader George A. Drew had largely escaped blame for the poor showing at the previous election, the years ahead saw much debate about the party's future direction. Many believed that Ontario, where Drew remained personally very popular and his successor as Premier, Leslie Frost had maintained the party's heavy dominance of the provincial legislature, was key to any prospect of the Progressive Conservatives forming another government. Others within the party pointed out that even if they won every single seat in Ontario, it would leave them 48 seats short of a majority, and that they would need to make up the numbers elsewhere. Western Canada seemed the only realistic prospect of building a political base elsewhere in the country due to the Liberals' heavy domination of Quebec and (to a lesser degree) Atlantic Canada, but the party establishment largely dismissed this prospect, seeing the west as CCF and Socred territory. All the while, the party generally polled better than it had done in the 1945-1949 parliament, but there rarely looked to be any prospect of them forming the next government.

Ultimately, the election result would do little to settle these factional disputes, as the party made something of a recovery in Ontario, and won two extra seats apiece in Quebec and Manitoba, but saw a further drop in their popular vote share west of Manitoba.

=== Co-Operative Commonwealth Federation ===
For this election, the CCF scaled back the scope of their campaign. Having tried to win seats throughout the country in the previous two elections, this time the party's goal was to re-establish its political base in Western Canada and retake the seats that it had lost to the Liberals. The party therefore abandoned any pretence of trying to make a breakthrough in Ontario, nominating very few candidates east of Manitoba, and almost none in Quebec.

In the end, despite suffering the largest popular vote share loss of the major parties, the CCF's strategy paid off, largely reversing the losses they had suffered in the previous election. They earned a firm majority of seats in their political base of Saskatchewan, and also performed well in British Columbia, coming a close second to the Liberals in the province's seat total. Their final total of 23 seats nationally was 5 fewer than they had earned in 1945, but still the second-best showing since the party's formation.

=== Social Credit Party ===
While little changed in the Social Credit Party's political base of Alberta, with them winning the same total of 10 seats that they had at the previous federal election, this election marked an important breakthrough for the Socreds, who were able to capitalise on the newly-formed Social Credit provincial government of W. A. C. Bennett in British Columbia, and win seats in the province for the first time. They won a total of five seats, while coming a very close third (within half a percentage point) behind the CCF in the province's popular vote. For the first time, the Socreds held more seats than the Progressive Conservatives in two provinces.

During the campaign, leader Solon Earl Low was largely able to side-step any questions of whether his party would be willing to prop up a potential minority Progressive Conservative government, as there was little doubt that the Liberals would win another majority. However, the Socreds' breakthrough into a new province and the PCs' seeming disinterest in the west soon resulted in much debate about Social Credit's potential role in a federal government (or at least supporting one on matters of confidence) in the years ahead.

== National results ==
See also Results of the 1953 Canadian federal election

Party	Party leader	# of candidates	Seats			Popular vote		
Party	Party leader	# of candidates	1949	Elected	% Change	#	%	pp Change
Liberal	Louis St. Laurent	262	191	169	-11.5%	2,731,633	48.43%	-0.72
Progressive Conservative	George Drew	248	41	51	+24.4%	1,749,579	31.02%	+1.37
Co-operative Commonwealth	M.J. Coldwell	170	13	23	+76.9%	636,310	11.28%	-2.14
Social Credit	Solon Low	71	10	15	+50%	304,553	5.40%	+3.09
Independent		14	4	3	-25.0%	58,458	1.04%	-1.01
Independent Liberal		19	1	2	+100%	68,506	1.21%	+0.69
Liberal-Labour^{1}		1	1	1	-	11,380	0.20%	-
Liberal–Progressive		1	1	1	-	8,958	0.16%	-
Labor–Progressive	Tim Buck	100	-	-	-	59,622	1.06%	+0.50
Nationalist	Adrien Arcand	1	*	-	*	7,496	0.13%	*
Independent Progressive Conservative		3	-	-	-	1,636	0.03%	-0.11
Christian Liberal		1	*	-	*	1,505	0.03%	*
Independent Social Credit		1	-	-	-	422	0.01%	-0.07
Locataire (candidat)		1	*	-	*	417	0.01%	*
Anti-Communist		1	*	-	*	333	0.01%	*
Socialist Labour		1	-	-	-	130	x	x
Total		897	262	265	+1.1%	5,640,938	100%	
Sources: http://www.elections.ca History of Federal Ridings since 1867

Notes:

* - not applicable - the party was not recognized in the previous election

x - less than 0.005% of the popular vote

^{1} The Liberal-Labour MP sat with the Liberal caucus.

== Vote and seat summaries ==
Ternary plots - shift of electoral support (1949-1953)
1949

1953
Electoral districts identified by colours of winning parties

Popular vote
Liberal	48.43%
PC	31.02%
CCF	11.28%
Social Credit	5.40%
Others	3.87%

Seat totals
Liberal	64.15%
PC	19.24%
CCF	8.67%
Social Credit	5.66%
Others	2.26%

== Results by province ==
Party name		BC	AB	SK	MB	ON	QC	NB	NS	PE	NL	NW	YK	Total
Liberal	Seats:	8	4	5	7	50	66	7	10	3	7	1	1	169
Liberal	Vote (%):	30.9	35.1	37.3	37.0	46.0	61.0	52.7	53.0	51.1	67.2	49.4	78.7	48.4
Progressive Conservative	Seats:	3	2	1	3	33	4	3	1	1	0	-	-	51
Progressive Conservative	Vote (%):	14.1	14.5	11.7	27.0	40.3	29.4	41.9	40.1	48.0	28.1	38.5	21.3	31.0
Co-operative Commonwealth	Seats:	7	-	11	3	1	-	-	1	-	-			23
Co-operative Commonwealth	Vote (%):	26.6	6.9	44.2	23.6	11.1	1.5	3.0	6.7	0.8	0.6			11.3
Social Credit	Seats:	4	11	-	-	-		-						15
Social Credit	Vote (%):	26.1	40.7	5.3	6.3	0.3		0.4						5.4
Independent	Seats:		-		-	-	3				-	-		3
Independent	Vote (%):		0.1		0.2	0.3	3.0				4.0	12.4		1.0
Independent Liberal	Seats:				-	-	2	-						2
Independent Liberal	Vote (%):				4.0	0.3	3.7	1.9						1.2
Liberal–Labour	Seats:					1								1
Liberal–Labour	Vote (%):					0.6								0.2
Liberal-Progressive	Seats:				1									1
Liberal-Progressive	Vote (%):				3.3									0.2
Total Seats		22	17	17	14	85	75	10	12	4	7	1	1	265
Parties that won no seats:
Labor–Progressive	Vote (%):	2.2	2.7	1.1	2.3	1.0	0.7		0.2					1.1
Nationalist	Vote (%):						0.5							0.1
Independent PC	Vote (%):						0.1							xx
Christian Liberal	Vote (%):					0.1								xx
Independent Social Credit	Vote (%):		0.1											xx
Locataire (candidat)	Vote (%):						xx							xx
Anti-Communist	Vote (%):						xx							xx
Socialist Labour	Vote (%):					xx								xx

- xx - less than 0.05% of the popular vote

== See also ==
- List of Canadian federal general elections
- List of political parties in Canada
- 22nd Canadian Parliament
