= Results of the 1963 Canadian federal election =

1963 Canadian federal election

== Results by Province and Territory ==
=== Alberta ===
Results in Alberta
Party	Seats	Second	Third	Fourth	Fifth	Sixth	Votes	%	+/-
Progressive Conservative	14	3	0	0	0	0	249,067	45.32	
Social Credit	2	10	5	0	0	0	141,956	25.83	
Liberals	1	4	12	0	0	0	121,473	22.11	
NDP	0	0	0	17	0	0	35,775	6.51	
Communist	0	0	0	0	2	0	795	0.14	
Independent	0	0	0	0	1	1	460	0.08	
Total	17						549,526	100.0	

=== British Columbia ===
Results in British Columbia
Party	Seats	Second	Third	Fourth	Fifth	Votes	%	+/-
Liberals	7	12	3	0	0	237,896	32.32	
NDP	9	5	6	2	0	222,883	30.28	
Progressive Conservative	4	4	12	2	0	172,501	23.44	
Social Credit	2	1	1	18	0	97,846	13.29	
Independent Liberal	0	0	0	0	2	3,587	0.49	
Communist	0	0	0	0	2	1,027	0.14	
Independent	0	0	0	0	1	232	0.03	
Total	22					735,972	100.0	

=== Manitoba ===
Results in Manitoba
Party	Seats	Second	Third	Fourth	Fifth	Votes	%	+/-
Progressive Conservative	10	3	1	0	0	169,013	42.3	
Liberals	2	11	1	0	0	134,905	33.76	
NDP	2	0	7	4	0	66,652	16.68	
Social Credit	0	0	5	8	0	28,157	7.05	
Independent	0	0	0	0	1	826	0.21	
Total	14					399,553	100.0	

=== New Brunswick ===
Results in New Brunswick
Party	Seats	Second	Third	Fourth	Votes	%	+/-
Liberals	6	4	0	0	115,036	47.25	
Progressive Conservative	4	4	2	0	98,462	40.44	
Social Credit	0	2	5	3	21,050	8.65	
NDP	0	0	3	4	8,899	3.66	
Total	10				243,447	100.0	

=== Newfoundland and Labrador ===
Results in Newfoundland and Labrador
Party	Seats	Second	Third	Votes	%	+/-
Liberals	7	0	0	97,576	64.46	
Progressive Conservative	0	6	1	45,491	30.05	
NDP	0	1	2	6,364	4.2	
Independent Liberal	0	0	1	1,943	1.28	
Total	7			151,374	100.0	

=== Northwest Territories ===
Results in Northwest Territories
Party	Seats	Second	Votes	%	+/-
Progressive Conservative	1	0	4,814	56.82	
Liberals	0	1	3,659	43.18	
Total	1		8,473	100.0	

=== Nova Scotia ===
Results in Nova Scotia
Party	Seats	Second	Third	Fourth	Fifth	Votes	%	+/-
Progressive Conservative	7	4	1	0	0	195,711	46.85	
Liberals	5	6	1	0	0	195,007	46.68	
NDP	0	1	5	2	1	26,617	6.37	
Social Credit	0	0	1	1	0	401	0.1	
Total	12					417,736	100.0	

=== Ontario ===
Results in Ontario
Party	Seats	Second	Third	Fourth	Fifth	Sixth	Votes	%	+/-
Liberals	51	30	3	0	0	0	1,269,997	45.63	
Progressive Conservative	27	48	10	0	0	0	979,359	35.18	
NDP	6	6	59	8	1	0	449,184	16.14	
Social Credit	0	0	9	56	3	0	56,276	2.02	
Liberal-Labour	1	0	0	0	0	0	16,794	0.6	
Independent Liberal	0	1	0	1	0	0	7,808	0.28	
Communist	0	0	0	2	3	0	1,777	0.06	
Independent Conservative	0	0	0	1	1	0	1,159	0.04	
Independent	0	0	1	0	1	0	760	0.03	
Independent Progressive Conservative	0	0	0	0	0	1	349	0.01	
Socialist Labour	0	0	0	0	0	1	43	0	
Total	85						2,783,506	100.0	

=== Prince Edward Island ===
Results in Prince Edward Island
Party	Seats	Second	Third	Fourth	Fifth	Votes	%	+/-
Progressive Conservative	2	2	0	0	0	35,965	51.99	
Liberals	2	1	1	0	0	32,073	46.36	
NDP	0	0	2	1	1	1,140	1.65	
Total	4					69,178	100.0	

=== Quebec ===
Results in Quebec
Party	Seats	Second	Third	Fourth	Fifth	Sixth	Votes	%	+/-
Liberals	48	26	1	0	0	0	966,172	45.62	
Social Credit	20	29	19	7	0	0	578,347	27.31	
Progressive Conservative	8	17	44	6	0	0	413,561	19.53	
NDP	0	3	10	46	1	0	151,061	7.13	
Independent	0	0	0	2	0	0	2,823	0.13	
Independent Progressive Conservative	0	0	1	0	0	0	1,616	0.08	
Independent Liberal	0	0	0	0	1	0	1,320	0.06	
Ouvrier indépendant	0	0	0	0	1	0	1,064	0.05	
Independent Social Credit	0	0	0	1	1	0	717	0.03	
Nationalist	0	0	0	0	1	0	540	0.03	
Candidat libéral des électeurs	0	0	0	0	0	1	496	0.02	
Communist	0	0	0	0	1	0	327	0.02	
Total	76						2,118,044	100.0	

=== Saskatchewan ===
Results in Saskatchewan
Party	Seats	Second	Third	Fourth	Fifth	Sixth	Votes	%	+/-
Progressive Conservative	17	0	0	0	0	0	224,700	53.74	
Liberals	0	12	5	0	0	0	100,747	24.09	
NDP	0	5	12	0	0	0	76,126	18.21	
Social Credit	0	0	0	16	0	0	16,110	3.85	
Communist	0	0	0	0	1	1	308	0.07	
Independent	0	0	0	0	1	0	135	0.03	
Total	17						418,126	100.0	

=== Yukon ===
Results in Yukon
Party	Seats	Second	Third	Votes	%	+/-
Progressive Conservative	1	0	0	2,969	49.62	
Liberals	0	1	0	2,455	41.03	
Social Credit	0	0	1	560	9.36	
Total	1			5,984	100.0	
