= Results of the 1953 Canadian federal election =

1953 Canadian federal election

== Results by province and territory ==
=== Alberta ===
Results in Alberta
Party	Seats	Second	Third	Fourth	Fifth	Sixth	Votes	%	+/-
Social Credit	11	5	1				138,847	40.73	
Liberals	4	12	1				119,604	35.08	
Progressive Conservative	2		8	2			49,450	14.51	
CCF			5	8			23,573	6.91	
Labor-Progressive			2	3	7		9,155	2.69	
Independent						1	275	0.08	
Total	17						340,904	100.0	

=== British Columbia ===
Results in British Columbia
Party	Seats	Second	Third	Fourth	Fifth	Sixth	Votes	%	+/-
Liberals	8	9	5				145,570	30.87	
CCF	7	2	9	4			125,487	26.61	
Social Credit	4	11	6	1			123,278	26.14	
Progressive Conservative	3		2	11			66,426	14.09	
Labor-Progressive				4	12	1	10,340	2.19	
Independent Social Credit					1		422	0.09	
Total	22						471,523	100.0	

=== Manitoba ===
Results in Manitoba
Party	Seats	Second	Third	Fourth	Fifth	Sixth	Seventh	Votes	%	+/-
Liberals	7	6						100,817	36.96	
Progressive Conservative	3	5	5	1				73,644	27	
CCF	3	3	3	1				64,402	23.61	
Social Credit			6	2				17,260	6.33	
Liberal Progressive	1							8,958	3.28	
Labor-Progressive				5	1	1		6,194	2.27	
Independent Liberal					1			1,068	0.39	
Independent						1	1	434	0.16	
Total	14							272,777	100.0	

=== New Brunswick ===
Results in New Brunswick
Party	Seats	Second	Third	Fourth	Votes	%	+/-
Liberals	7	3			117,619	52.72	
Progressive Conservative	3	7			93,450	41.89	
CCF			6	1	6,769	3.03	
Independent Liberal			1		4,317	1.94	
Social Credit			1		931	0.42	
Total	10				223,086	100.0	

=== Newfoundland and Labrador ===
Results in Newfoundland and Labrador
Party	Seats	Second	Third	Votes	%	+/-
Liberals	7			74,357	67.24	
Progressive Conservative		7		31,060	28.09	
Independent			1	4,459	4.03	
CCF			1	707	0.64	
Total	7			110,583	100.0	

=== Northwest Territories ===
Results in Northwest Territories
Party	Seats	Second	Third	Votes	%	+/-
Liberals	1			1,722	49.38	
Progressive Conservative		1		1,344	38.54	
Independent			1	421	12.07	
Total	1			3,487	100.0	

=== Nova Scotia ===
Results in Nova Scotia
Party	Seats	Second	Third	Fourth	Fifth	Sixth	Votes	%	+/-
Liberals	9	3					176,554	52.99	
Progressive Conservative	1	8	2	1			133,498	40.07	
CCF	1		2		1	1	22,357	6.71	
Labor-Progressive				1			794	0.24	
Total	11						333,203	100.0	

=== Ontario ===
Results in Ontario
Party	Seats	Second	Third	Fourth	Fifth	Votes	%	+/-
Liberals	50	33				881,776	46.04	
Progressive Conservative	33	48	4			772,691	40.34	
CCF	1	3	60	1		212,224	11.08	
Labor-Progressive				28	1	18,414	0.96	
Liberal Labour Party	1					11,380	0.59	
Independent		1		2		6,337	0.33	
Independent Liberal			1	1		5,537	0.29	
Social Credit				8	1	5,427	0.28	
Christian Liberal				1		1,505	0.08	
Socialist Labour					1	130	0.01	
Total	85					1,915,421	100.0	

=== Prince Edward Island ===
Results in Prince Edward Island
Party	Seats	Second	Third	Fourth	Fifth	Votes	%	+/-
Progressive Conservative		3	1		1	41,922	54.91	
Liberals	3			1		33,874	44.37	
CCF			1			552	0.72	
Total	3					76,348	100.0	

=== Quebec ===
Results in Quebec
Party	Seats	Second	Third	Fourth	Fifth	Sixth	Votes	%	+/-
Liberals	66	8	1				944,071	61.03	
Progressive Conservative	4	61	6				454,052	29.35	
Independent Liberal	2	3	6	4		1	57,584	3.72	
Independent	3		2	1			46,532	3.01	
CCF			22	5	2		23,833	1.54	
Labor-Progressive			5	14	5	1	10,819	0.7	
Nationalist		1					7,496	0.48	
Independent Progressive Conservative				1	2		1,636	0.11	
Locataire (candidat)				1			417	0.03	
Anti-Communist					1		333	0.02	
Total	73						1,546,773	100.0	

=== Saskatchewan ===
Results in Saskatchewan
Party	Seats	Second	Third	Fourth	Fifth	Votes	%	+/-
CCF	11	6				156,406	44.16	
Liberals	5	11	1			133,493	37.69	
Progressive Conservative	1		9	5		41,538	11.73	
Social Credit			7	7		18,810	5.31	
Labor-Progressive				3	6	3,906	1.1	
Total	17					354,153	100.0	

=== Yukon ===
Results in Yukon
Party	Seats	Second	Third	Votes	%	+/-
Liberals	1			2,176	57.81	
Social Credit		1		998	26.51	
Progressive Conservative			1	590	15.67	
Total	1			3,764	100.0	
