= Results of the 1958 Canadian federal election =

1958 Canadian federal election

== Results by Province and Territory ==
=== Alberta ===
Results in Alberta
Party	Seats	Second	Third	Fourth	Fifth	Sixth	Votes	%	+/-
Progressive Conservative	17	0	0	0	0	0	269,689	59.95	
Social Credit	0	14	3	0	0	0	97,141	21.59	
Liberals	0	3	14	0	0	0	61,583	13.69	
CCF	0	0	0	15	0	0	19,666	4.37	
Labor-Progressive	0	0	0	0	2	0	1,196	0.27	
Independent Social Credit	0	0	0	1	0	0	361	0.08	
Independent Progressive Conservative	0	0	0	0	0	1	253	0.06	
Total	17						449,889	100.0	

=== British Columbia ===
Results in British Columbia
Party	Seats	Second	Third	Fourth	Fifth	Votes	%	+/-
Progressive Conservative	18	4	0	0	0	308,971	49.4	
CCF	4	7	9	2	0	153,405	24.53	
Liberals	0	8	11	3	0	100,889	16.13	
Social Credit	0	3	2	17	0	59,762	9.56	
Labor-Progressive	0	0	0	0	5	2,415	0.39	
Total	22					625,442	100.0	

=== Manitoba ===
Results in Manitoba
Party	Seats	Second	Third	Fourth	Votes	%	+/-
Progressive Conservative	14	0	0	0	216,948	56.71	
Liberals	0	9	5	0	82,450	21.55	
CCF	0	5	7	2	74,906	19.58	
Social Credit	0	0	2	4	6,753	1.77	
Labor-Progressive	0	0	0	1	1,503	0.39	
Total	14				382,560	100.0	

=== New Brunswick ===
Results in New Brunswick
Party	Seats	Second	Third	Fourth	Votes	%	+/-
Progressive Conservative	7	3	0	0	133,935	54.12	
Liberals	3	7	0	0	107,297	43.36	
CCF	0	0	3	0	4,541	1.83	
Social Credit	0	0	2	1	1,711	0.69	
Total	10				247,484	100.0	

=== Newfoundland and Labrador ===
Results in Newfoundland and Labrador
Party	Seats	Second	Third	Votes	%	+/-
Liberals	5	2	0	86,960	54.44	
Progressive Conservative	2	5	0	72,282	45.25	
Independent Liberal	0	0	1	263	0.16	
CCF	0	0	1	240	0.15	
Total	7			159,745	100.0	

=== Northwest Territories ===
Results in Northwest Territories
Party	Seats	Second	Votes	%	+/-
Liberals	1	0	2,782	57.22	
Progressive Conservative	0	1	2,080	42.78	
Total	1		4,862	100.0	

=== Nova Scotia ===
Results in Nova Scotia
Party	Seats	Second	Third	Fourth	Fifth	Votes	%	+/-
Progressive Conservative	12	0	0	0	0	237,422	57.02	
Liberals	0	10	2	0	0	160,026	38.43	
CCF	0	1	1	1	1	18,911	4.54	
Total	12					416,359	100.0	

=== Ontario ===
Results in Ontario
Party	Seats	Second	Third	Fourth	Fifth	Votes	%	+/-
Progressive Conservative	67	18	0	0	0	1,413,730	56.44	
Liberals	14	64	6	0	0	803,568	32.08	
CCF	3	3	57	0	0	262,390	10.48	
Liberal-Labour	1	0	0	0	0	11,956	0.48	
Social Credit	0	0	4	12	2	8,386	0.33	
Labor-Progressive	0	0	0	6	0	3,035	0.12	
Independent	0	0	1	2	0	1,271	0.05	
Socialist	0	0	0	1	0	447	0.02	
Total	85					2,504,783	100.0	

=== Prince Edward Island ===
Results in Prince Edward Island
Party	Seats	Second	Third	Votes	%	+/-
Progressive Conservative	4	0	0	42,911	62.21	
Liberals	0	3	1	25,847	37.47	
CCF	0	0	1	215	0.31	
Total	4			68,973	100.0	

=== Quebec ===
Results in Quebec
Party	Seats	Second	Third	Fourth	Fifth	Sixth	Votes	%	+/-
Progressive Conservative	50	24	1	0	0	0	1,003,276	49.64	
Liberals	25	50	0	0	0	0	921,090	45.57	
CCF	0	0	25	3	0	1	45,594	2.26	
Social Credit	0	0	10	3	2	0	12,858	0.64	
Independent	0	1	2	2	0	0	12,794	0.63	
Independent Liberal	0	0	5	3	1	0	11,791	0.58	
Candidate of the Electors	0	0	1	0	0	0	8,276	0.41	
Independent Progressive Conservative	0	0	2	2	0	0	1,844	0.09	
Labor-Progressive	0	0	0	2	0	0	1,162	0.06	
Capital Familial	0	0	1	0	0	0	968	0.05	
Radical Chrétien	0	0	0	1	0	0	687	0.03	
Socialist	0	0	0	1	0	0	666	0.03	
Parti Ouvrier Canadien	0	0	1	0	0	0	243	0.01	
Total	75						2,021,249	100.0	

=== Saskatchewan ===
Results in Saskatchewan
Party	Seats	Second	Third	Fourth	Votes	%	+/-
Progressive Conservative	16	1	0	0	204,442	51.4	
CCF	1	12	4	0	112,800	28.36	
Liberals	0	4	13	0	78,121	19.64	
Social Credit	0	0	0	1	1,745	0.44	
Labor-Progressive	0	0	0	2	458	0.12	
Independent	0	0	0	1	146	0.04	
Total	17				397,712	100.0	

=== Yukon ===
Results in Yukon
Party	Seats	Second	Third	Votes	%	+/-
Progressive Conservative	1	0	0	2,947	54.48	
Liberals	0	1	0	2,340	43.26	
Independent Conservative	0	0	1	122	2.26	
Total	1			5,409	100.0	
