= List of Jewish communities in North America =

This is a list of Jewish communities in the North America, including yeshivas, Hebrew schools, Jewish day schools and synagogues. A yeshiva (Hebrew: ישיבה) is a center for the study of Torah and the Talmud in Orthodox Judaism. A yeshiva usually is led by a rabbi with the title "Rosh Yeshiva" (Head of the Yeshiva).

== Canada ==
=== Alberta ===
- Beth Israel Synagogue
- Beth Shalom Synagogue (Edmonton)
- Little Synagogue on the Prairie
- Temple Beth Ora Synagogue (Edmonton)

=== British Columbia ===
- Congregation Beth Israel (Vancouver)
- Congregation Emanu-El (Victoria)
- Congregation Schara Tzedeck
- King David School, Vancouver
- Peretz Centre for Secular Jewish Culture
- Vancouver Hebrew Academy
- Vancouver Talmud Torah

=== Manitoba ===
- Ohr HaTorah Day School
- Shaarey Zedek Synagogue
- Winnipeg Jewish Theatre

=== Newfoundland and Labrador ===
- Beth El Synagogue

=== Nova Scotia ===
- Beth Israel Synagogue

=== Ontario ===
- Adath Israel Congregation (Toronto)
- Adath Shalom (Ottawa)
- Anshei Minsk
- Associated Hebrew Schools of Toronto
- Bathurst Jewish Community Centre
- Beach Hebrew Institute
- Beth Israel Synagogue (Peterborough)
- Beit Tikvah of Ottawa
- Beth Tikvah Synagogue Toronto
- Beth Avraham Yoseph of Toronto
- Beth Israel Congregation (Kingston, Ontario)
- Beth Tzedec Congregation
- Bialik Hebrew Day School
- Bnei Akiva Schools of Toronto
- Canadian Jewish Political Affairs Committee
- City Shul
- Congregation B'nai Israel (St. Catharines)
- Congregation Habonim Toronto
- Congregation Knesseth Israel (Toronto)
- Congregation Shaarey Zedek (Windsor, Ontario)
- Eitz Chaim Schools
- First Narayever Congregation
- Harold Green Jewish Theatre
- Holy Blossom Temple
- Institute for Advanced Judaic Studies
- Kiever Synagogue
- Kollel Ohr Yosef
- Machzikei Hadas
- Morris Winchevsky School
- Netivot HaTorah Day School
- Or Haneshamah
- Oraynu Congregation for Humanistic Judaism
- Shaarei Shomayim (Toronto)
- Shaarei Tzedec
- Sons of Jacob Synagogue
- Statshover Congregation of Toronto
- Talpiot College (Toronto)
- Temple Israel (Ottawa)
- The Ward, Toronto
- Tiferes Bais Yaakov
- Tiferet Israel Congregation
- United Synagogue Day School
- Yeshiva Ner Yisroel of Toronto
- Young Israel of Ottawa

=== Quebec ===
- Bagg Street Shul
- Beth Ora
- Bronfman Jewish Education Centre
- Congregation Beth Israel Ohev Sholem
- Congregation Dorshei Emet
- Congregation Maghen Abraham (Montreal)
- Congregation Shaar Hashomayim
- Dora Wasserman Yiddish Theatre
- Federation CJA
- Jewish General Hospital
- Jewish People's and Peretz Schools
- Kiryas Tosh
- Montefiore Club
- Montreal Holocaust Memorial Centre
- Rabbinical College of Canada
- Rouyn-Noranda Synagogue
- Segal Centre for Performing Arts
- Shaare Zedek Congregation (Montreal)
- Spanish and Portuguese Synagogue of Montreal
- Temple Emanu-El-Beth Sholom
- United Talmud Torahs of Montreal

=== Saskatchewan ===
- Beth Israel Synagogue

== Mexico ==
- Colegio Hebreo Maguen David
- Colegio Hebreo Monte Sinaí
- Colegio Hebreo Sefaradí
- Colegio Hebreo Tarbut
- Colegio Israelita de México
- Historic Synagogue Justo Sierra 71

== United States ==
=== Alabama ===
- Agudath Israel Etz Ahayem, Montgomery, Alabama
- Congregation Sha'arai Shomayim (Mobile, Alabama)
- Congregation Knesseth Israel, Mountain Brook (suburb of Birmingham)
- Temple Beth Or, Montgomery, Alabama
- Temple Beth-El, Birmingham, Alabama
- Temple Beth-El (Anniston, Alabama)
- Temple Emanu-El, Birmingham, Alabama
- Temple B'nai Sholom (Huntsville, Alabama)
- Temple B'nai Jeshurun (Demopolis, Alabama)
- Congregation Beth Shalom (Auburn, Alabama)

=== Arizona ===
- Congregation Beth Israel (Scottsdale, Arizona)
- Jewish Federation of Greater Phoenix
- Jewish History Museum (Tucson)
- Phoenix, AZ, Hebrew Academy
- Tucson, AZ, Hebrew Academy
- Tucson, AZ, Temple Emanu-El
- Temple Beth Israel (Phoenix, Arizona)

=== California ===
- American Jewish University
- Beth Chayim Chadashim
- Beth Jacob Congregation (Beverly Hills, California)
- Breed Street Shul
- Beyt Tikkun Synagogue
- Bush Street Temple
- Congregation Beth Israel (San Diego, California)
- Congregation B'nai Israel (Sacramento, California)
- Congregation Ner Tamid
- Congregation Beth Israel-Judea
- Congregation Emanu-El (San Francisco, California)
- Congregation Sherith Israel (San Francisco, California)
- Congregation Beth Israel (Berkeley, California)
- Congregation Beth Am (Los Altos Hills, California)
- Congregation B'nai Israel (Daly City, California)
- Congregation Emanu-El (San Francisco, California)
- Summer Camp Ramah, Ojai
- Pacific Jewish Center, Los Angeles
- Pasadena Jewish Temple and Center
- Rodef Sholom (San Rafael, California)
- Sephardic Temple Tifereth Israel
- Sinai Temple (Los Angeles, California)
- Stephen S. Wise Temple
- Temple Beth Israel (Fresno, California)
- Temple Israel (Stockton, California)
- Temple Sinai (Oakland, California)
- Temple Beth Israel of Highland Park and Eagle Rock
- Temple Israel of Hollywood
- Valley Beth Shalom
- Wilshire Boulevard Temple
- Yeshiva Ohr Elchonon Chabad/West Coast Talmudical Seminary, Los Angeles
- Ziegler School of Rabbinic Studies

=== Colorado ===
- Beth HaMedrosh Hagodol-Beth Joseph, Denver
- Denver West Side Jewish Community
- Temple Aaron, Trinidad, Colorado
- Temple Emanuel (Curtis Street, Denver, Colorado)
- Temple Sinai (Denver, Colorado)
- Denver, CO, Yeshiva Toras Chaim

=== Connecticut ===
- Achavath Achim Synagogue
- Agudath Sholem Synagogue
- Ahavas Sholem Synagogue
- Anshei Israel Synagogue
- Beth Israel Synagogue (New Haven, Connecticut)
- Beth Israel Synagogue (Norwalk, Connecticut)
- Beth Shalom Rodfe Zedek
- Congregation B'nai Israel (Bridgeport, Connecticut)
- Congregation Beth Israel (West Hartford, Connecticut)
- Congregation B'nai Jacob (Woodbridge, Connecticut)
- Congregation Knesseth Israel (Ellington, Connecticut)
- Congregation Mishkan Israel
- Ohev Sholem Synagogue
- Temple Beth Israel (Hartford, Connecticut)
- Tephereth Israel Synagogue

=== District of Columbia ===
- Adas Israel Congregation (Washington, D.C.)
- Kesher Israel, Washington, D.C.
- Ohev Sholom - The National Synagogue, Washington, D.C.
- Sixth & I Historic Synagogue, Washington, D.C.
- Tikkun Leil Shabbat, Washington, D.C.
- Washington, D.C. Jewish Community Center
- Washington Hebrew Congregation

=== Florida ===
- Ben Gamla Charter School
- Beth Jacob Social Hall and Congregation
- Congregation Ahavath Chesed, Jacksonville, FL
- Congregation Beth Shira, Miami, FL
- Cuban Hebrew Congregation
- David Posnack Jewish Day School
- Jewish Museum of Florida
- Michael-Ann Russel Jewish Community Center
- Rabbi Alexander S. Gross Hebrew Academy
- Samuel Scheck Hillel Community Day School
- Temple Beth-El (Pensacola, Florida)
- Temple Beth Sholom (Miami Beach, Florida)
- United Hebrews of Ocala
- Weinbaum Yeshiva High School

=== Georgia ===
- Congregation Beth Jacob (Atlanta)
- Congregation B'nai Torah, Sandy Springs
- Congregation Mickve Israel, Savannah
- Summer Camp Ramah Darom, Clayton
- Temple Beth Israel (Macon, Georgia)
- The Temple (Atlanta, Georgia)
- Yeshiva Ohr Yisrael, Atlanta

=== Hawaii ===
- Temple Emanu-El (Honolulu, Hawaii)

=== Idaho ===
- Ahavath Beth Israel (Boise, Idaho)

=== Illinois ===
- Fasman Yeshiva High School, Skokie, IL
- Hebrew Theological College, Skokie, IL
- Ida Crown Jewish Academy, Skokie, IL
- KAM Isaiah Israel, Chicago, IL
- Telshe Yeshiva of Chicago, IL
- Yeshiva Keser Yonah, Chicago IL
- Khal Chesed L'Avraham-The Chicago Center, Chicago IL
- Adas Yeshurun, Chicago IL
- Agudas Yisroel-Warsaw Bikur Cholim, Chicago IL
- Chicago Community Kollel, Chicago IL
- Peterson Park Kollel, Chicago IL
- The Chicago Chassidishe Kollel, Chicago IL

=== Indiana ===
- Congregation Achduth Vesholom, Fort Wayne, Indiana

=== Iowa ===
- Temple Emanuel (Davenport, Iowa)

=== Kentucky ===
- Congregation Agudath Achim (Ashland, Kentucky)
- Louisville, Congregation Anshei Sfard (Orthodox)

=== Louisiana ===
- Alexandria, Bnai Israel Synagogue
- Alexandria, Congregation Gemiluth Chassodim
- Anshe Sfard Synagogue,(New Orleans)
- Congregation Beth Israel (New Orleans)
- Touro Synagogue (New Orleans)
- Shreveport, Bnai Zion Temple

=== Maine ===
- Etz Chaim Synagogue
- Shaarey Tphiloh, Portland, Maine

=== Maryland ===
- Baltimore Hebrew Congregation
- Beth Shalom Congregation (Columbia, Maryland), Columbia, Maryland
- Beth Tfiloh Dahan Community School
- Cascade, MD, Summer Camp Louise
- Thurmond, MD, Summer Camp Airy
- Congregation Or Chadash, Damascus, Maryland
- B'er Chayim Temple, Cumberland, Maryland
- Ohev Sholom Talmud Torah Congregation of Olney, Olney, Maryland
- Yeshivas Ner Yisroel

=== Massachusetts ===
- Hebrew College, Newton, MA
- Palmer, MA, Camp Ramah in New England
- Adams Street Shul, Newton, Massachusetts
- Ahavath Torah (Stoughton, Massachusetts)
- Beth Israel Synagogue (Cambridge, Massachusetts)
- Congregation Beth Israel (Worcester, Massachusetts)
- Kahal B'raira, Cambridge, Massachusetts
- Shaarai Torah Synagogue (Worcester, Massachusetts)
- Temple Emanuel Sinai (Worcester, Massachusetts)
- Temple Israel (Boston, Massachusetts)
- The Vilna Shul, Boston, Massachusetts

=== Michigan ===
- Temple Emanuel (Grand Rapids, Michigan)
- Young Israel of Southfield (Southfield, Michigan)

=== Minnesota ===
- Adas Israel Congregation, Duluth, MN
- Adath Jeshurun Congregation, Minnetonka, MN
- Beth Jacob Synagogue, Saint Paul, MN
- Mount Zion Temple, St. Louis, MN
- Temple Israel, Minneapolis MN

=== Mississippi ===
- Temple Adath Israel (Cleveland, Mississippi)
- Congregation Beth Israel (Meridian, Mississippi)
- Beth Israel Congregation (Jackson, Mississippi)
- Gemiluth Chessed (Port Gibson, Mississippi)
- Temple B'nai Shalom (Brookhaven, Mississippi)

=== Missouri ===
- E.F. Epstein Hebrew Academy Missouri
- United Hebrew Congregation (Chesterfield, Missouri)

=== Montana ===
- Temple Emanu-El (Helena, Montana)

=== New Hampshire ===
- Northwood, NH, Camp Yavneh

=== New Jersey ===
- Beth Medrash Govoha
- Betty and Milton Katz Jewish Community Center
- Birchas Chaim, Lakewood, NJ
- Bruriah High School for Girls
- Frisch School
- Golda Och Academy
- Gottesman RTW Academy
- Heichal HaTorah
- Hillel Yeshiva, New Jersey
- Jewish Educational Center, Elizabeth, NJ
- Joseph Kushner Hebrew Academy
- Ma'ayanot Yeshiva High School
- Mesivta Zichron Baruch, Clifton, NJ
- Metro Schechter Academy
- Moriah School
- Politz Day School of Cherry Hill
- Rabbi Jacob Joseph School
- Rabbi Pesach Raymon Yeshiva
- Rabbinical College of America
- Rae Kushner Yeshiva High School, NJ
- Schechter Regional High School
- Solomon Schechter Day School of Bergen County
- Talmudical Academy of Central New Jersey
- Torah Academy of Bergen County
- Yavneh Academy (New Jersey)
- Yeshiva of Carteret, NJ
- Yeshiva Gedola of Passaic
- Yeshiva Gedolah of Bayonne
- Yeshiva Gedolah of Cliffwood
- Yeshiva Beit Midrash Gohova, NJ

=== New York ===
- Angel Orensanz Center
- Ansche Chesed
- Anti-Defamation League
- Associated Bais Rivka Schools
- Bais Chana Women International
- Central Conference of American Rabbis
- Congregation Beth Elohim, Brooklyn, NY
- Congregation Ohab Zedek, Manhattan, NY
- Diamond District, New York City
- Friends of the Israel Defense Forces
- Hebrew Union College-Jewish Institute of Religion
- Hopewell Junction, NY, Summer Camp Kinder Ring
- Jewish Learning Institute
- Jewish Theological Seminary, New York City, NY
- Manhattan Talmudical Academy, NY
- Melvin J. Berman Hebrew Academy, NY
- National Conference of Synagogue Youth, NY
- North Shore Hebrew Academy, NY
- Union of Orthodox Jewish Congregations of America
- Rabbi Isaac Elchanan Theological Seminary
- Rabbinical Council of America
- Schechter Day School Network
- Stern College for Women
- Talmudical Institute of Upstate New York
- The Rabbinical Assembly, NY
- Temple Emanuel, New York City, NY
- Torah Umesorah – National Society for Hebrew Day Schools
- Touro College
- Wingdale, NY, Summer Camp Ramah
- Yeshiva Gedola Zichron Moshe, South Fallsburg, NY
- Yeshivas Rabbeinu Yisrael Meir HaKohen
- Yeshiva of Far Rockaway, NY
- Yeshivah of Flatbush
- Yeshiva Shaare Torah, NY
- Yeshivat Kol yaakov Great neck NY
- Yeshiva Tiferes Yisroel
- Yeshiva University, New York City, NY
- Yeshiva Zichron Yaakov
- Agudas Achim Synagogue, Livingston Manor, NY
- Anshei Glen Wild Synagogue, Sullivan County, NY
- B'nai Israel Synagogue (Woodbourne, New York)
- B'nai Jeshurun (Manhattan, New York)
- Beth Joseph Synagogue, Tupper Lake, NY
- Chevro Ahavath Zion Synagogue, Monticello, NY
- Congregation B'nai Israel Synagogue, Fleischmanns, NY
- Congregation Emanu-El of New York, Manhattan, NY
- Congregation Kehilath Jeshurun, Manhattan, NY
- Congregation Shaare Zedek (New York City)
- Congregation Shaare Zion, Brooklyn, NY
- Congregation Tifereth Israel Synagogue, Greenport, NY
- Fifth Avenue Synagogue, Manhattan, NY
- Kehilath Yaakov Pupa
- Park Avenue Synagogue, Manhattan, NY
- Park East Synagogue, Manhattan, NY
- Temple Beth Zion, Buffalo, NY
- Temple Shaaray Tefila, Manhattan, NY

=== North Carolina ===
- Greensboro, NC, American Hebrew Academy
- Congregation Beth Israel (Asheville, North Carolina)
- Temple of Israel (Wilmington, North Carolina)

=== North Dakota ===
- B'nai Israel Synagogue and Montefiore Cemetery

=== Ohio ===
- Anshe Chesed Fairmount Temple (Beachwood)
- Oheb Zedek-Cedar Sinai Synagogue (Lyndhurst)
- Park Synagogue (Cleveland Heights)
- Rockdale Temple
- Sherith Israel Temple
- Temple Tifereth-Israel (Beachwood, Ohio)

=== Oklahoma ===
- Temple Israel (Tulsa, Oklahoma)

=== Oregon ===
- Congregation Beth Israel (Portland, Oregon)

=== Pennsylvania ===
- Barrack Hebrew Academy, Bryn Mawr, PA
- Lake Como, PA, Summer Camp B'nai B'rith Perlman
- Kesher Israel Congregation (Harrisburg, Pennsylvania)
- Rodef Shalom Congregation, Pittsburgh, PA
- Talmudical Yeshiva of Philadelphia
- Wayne County, PA, Summer Camp Ramah
- Congregation Mikveh Israel (Philadelphia)
- Congregation Kehillas B'nai Shalom (Bucks County)
- Bais Moshe

=== Rhode Island ===
- Sons of Jacob Synagogue (Providence, Rhode Island)
- Temple Beth-El (Providence, Rhode Island)
- Touro Synagogue (Newport, Rhode Island)

=== South Carolina ===
- Congregation Kahal Kadosh Beth Elohim, Charleston, South Carolina
- Temple Beth Elohim (Georgetown, South Carolina)
- Beth Israel Congregation (Beaufort, South Carolina)
- Beth Israel Congregation (Florence, South Carolina)
- House of Peace Synagogue, Columbia, South Carolina
- Temple Kol Ami (Fort Mill, South Carolina)
- Temple Sinai (Sumter, South Carolina)

=== South Dakota ===
- Mount Zion

=== Tennessee ===
- Margolin Hebrew Academy, Memphis, TN
- Temple Adas Israel (Brownsville, Tennessee)
- Baron Hirsch Synagogue, Memphis, Tennessee
- Temple Israel (Memphis, Tennessee)
- Mizpah Congregation, Chattanooga, Tennessee
- Congregation Ohabai Sholom (Nashville, Tennessee)
- Congregation Sherith Israel (Nashville, Tennessee)
- Temple B'Nai Israel, Jackson, Tennessee

=== Texas ===
- Galveston, TX, Temple Bnai Israel
- Galveston TX, Congregation Beth Jacob
- Temple Beth Israel (Houston, Texas)
- B'nai Abraham Synagogue (Brenham, Texas)

=== Utah ===
- B'nai Israel Temple (Salt Lake City, Utah)

=== Vermont ===
- Old Ohavi Zedek Synagogue

=== Virginia ===
- Agudas Achim Congregation (Alexandria, Virginia)
- Portsmouth, VA, Temple Sinai Congregation
- Congregation Kol Emes (Richmond, Virginia)
- Stauton, VA, Temple House of Israel

=== Washington ===
- Bellingham, WA, Congregation Beth Israel
- Seattle, WA, Ravenna Kibbutz Community
- Seattle, WA, Sephardic Bikur Holim Congregation

=== West Virginia ===
- Ohev Sholom Temple
- Temple Shalom (Wheeling, West Virginia)

=== Wisconsin ===
- Glendale, WI, Congregation Beth Israel Ner Tamid
- Madison, WI, Gates of Heaven Synagogue

== United States territories ==
=== Puerto Rico ===
- Temple Beth Shalom, San Juan, PR

=== U.S. Virgin Islands ===
- Hebrew Congregation of St. Thomas, St. Thomas, VI

== See also ==
- Jewish Federation
- List of Jewish communities in the United Kingdom
- List of synagogues in the United States
- List of the oldest synagogues in the United States
- List of Yeshivas and Midrashas in Israel
