= Temple Sinai =

Temple Sinai or Sinai Temple may refer to:

== United States ==
- Sinai Temple (Los Angeles), California, U.S.
- Temple Sinai (Oakland, California), U.S.
- Temple Sinai (Denver), Colorado, U.S.
- Mount Sinai Temple (Sioux City, Iowa), U.S.
- Temple Sinai (New Orleans, Louisiana), U.S.
- Sinai Temple (Springfield, Massachusetts), U.S.
- Temple Emanuel Sinai (Worcester, Massachusetts), U.S.
- Temple Sinai (Sumter, South Carolina), U.S.
- Temple Sinai (Houston), Texas, U.S.
- Temple Sinai (Newport News, Virginia), U.S.
- Temple Sinai (Portsmouth, Virginia), U.S.
- Temple De Hirsch Sinai, formerly Temple Sinai, Bellevue, Washington, U.S.

== See also ==
- Sinai (disambiguation)
- Synagogue
