= Tifereth Israel =

Tifereth Israel (Hebrew: תפארת ישראל "Glory/Splendor/Beauty of Israel") may refer to:

== Synagogues ==
=== Canada ===
- Tiferet Israel Congregation (Toronto), a Moroccan Orthodox synagogue in North York, Toronto, Ontario

=== Israel ===
- Tiferet Yisrael Synagogue, one of the most outstanding synagogues in the Old City of Jerusalem in the 19th and 20th centuries, destroyed during the 1948 Arab-Israeli War and left in ruins. As of 2019, it is being rebuilt.

=== United States ===
==== California ====
- Sephardic Temple Tifereth Israel, a Sephardic synagogue in Los Angeles, California

==== Maryland ====
- Congregation Tiferes Yisroel, an Orthodox synagogue in Baltimore, Maryland

==== New York ====
- Congregation Tifereth Israel (Brooklyn, New York) (the "Park Slope Jewish Center"), a Conservative synagogue in Park Slope, Brooklyn
- Congregation Tifereth Israel (Queens, New York) (the "Home Street Synagogue"), a synagogue in Corona; the oldest synagogue in Queens
- Congregation Tifereth Israel (Greenport, New York), a Liberal-Conservative synagogue in Greenport, Suffolk County
- Congregation Tifereth Yehuda Veyisroel, a historic synagogue in Kerhonkson, New York
- Congregation Kneses Tifereth Israel, a Conservative synagogue in Port Chester, New York

==== Ohio ====
- The Temple Tifereth Israel (Cleveland, Ohio), a Reform congregation with a historic building in Cleveland and a second facility in suburban Beachwood, Ohio

==== Texas ====
- Congregation Tiferet Israel (Austin, Texas), an Orthodox congregation in Austin which relocated from Brenham, Texas

=== Venezuela ===
- Tiféret Israel Synagogue, a synagogue in Caracas, Venezuela

== Written works ==
- Tiferet Yisrael, a commentary on the Mishnah written by Israel Lipschitz
