= Samuel Scheck Hillel Community Day School =

Coordinates: 25.9511111°N 80.1519444°W

Scheck Hillel Community School
- Miami, Florida; United States

Information
- School type: Jewish day school
- Opened: 1971
- Headmaster: Rabbi Ari Leubitz
- Grades: PreK-12
- Enrollment: 1,350
- Campus type: Urban
- Colors: Navy and Cyan (Pantone 289 & Pantone 2995)
- Athletics: FHSAA
- Team name: Lions
- Accreditation: SACS; AISF
- Affiliation: Jewish
- Website: ehillel.org

Scheck Hillel Community School, known prior to 2012 as the Samuel Scheck Hillel Community Day School, is a private, Jewish, co-ed pK–12 school in Ojus, Florida, with a North Miami Beach address. It is located adjacent to the Michael-Ann Russel Jewish Community Center. It is the largest Jewish Day school in South Florida, and one of the largest in the country. Hillel is both a 2011 and 2020 Blue Ribbon school.

== About the school ==
The school's enrollment is close to 1250 students. Class size in the Lower School ranges from 16 to 23 depending on grade level. The school has a large international student community, with students ranging from countries all over the Americas, Europe, and Israel. The school consists of an Early Childhood, Lower, Middle and Upper School. It was founded in 1973.

The school contains a "Dual-curriculum" which instructs students in both Judaic and Secular studies, as well as ESOL (English for Speakers of Other Languages) primarily for students coming from South America.

Hillel also contains a program for children with certain disabilities called the Kesher (meaning "connection" in Hebrew) program, run by patient and understanding adults who know how to guide and nurture their students.

Unlike Jewish Day Schools in The Solomon Schechter Day School Association, Hillel is affiliated with the Orthodox movement Judaism, though Orthodox students themselves remain a small minority.

== History ==
Hillel was first conceived in the late 1960s by Dr. Joel and Peshe Dennis, Rabbi Max A. Lipschitz, and a handful of other founding fathers and mothers. The kind of traditional Jewish day school they envisioned, now known as The Samuel Scheck Hillel Community Day School, was born in early 1970.

In 1976, Hillel moved to its present site in North Miami Beach and expanded its campus to over 10 acres (40,000 m^{2}) adjacent to the Michael-Ann Russel Jewish Community Center. Years later, they realized another vital goal with the opening of The Ben Lipson Hillel Community High School.

When construction was completed on the high school wing in 1994, the '94 and '95 seniors were there. As the fresh concrete was being poured, they left their footsteps imprinted in what has since come to be known as the "Footsteps to the Future."

== Athletics ==
In 2014, Scheck Hillel opened their brand new athletic complex, The Diener Athletic Center. "The outdoor portion of the complex also features a softball diamond equipped with digital display boards and an advanced sound system. The Diener Athletic Center, the building that sits on the complex, includes a regulation-size basketball and volleyball courts, a weight and fitness room, locker rooms for men and women, a concession area and multi-use event spaces."

Hillel offers a variety of interscholastic sports including:

High School
Boys
Cross Country
Football
Golf
Basketball
Soccer, 2016 State Champions
Tennis
Volleyball

Girls
Cross Country
Volleyball
Golf
Basketball
Soccer
Flag Football
Tennis

Middle School
Boys
Football
Soccer
Basketball

Girls
Volleyball
Soccer
Basketball

Elementary
Boys and Girls
Basketball
Soccer

== Divisions ==
Hillel consists of three divisions:

- The Juda and Maria Diener Lower School, which includes all of the early childhood education (PK) and grades Kindergarten to grade five.
- The Henrietta Scheck Middle School, which includes grades six through eight.
- The Ben Lipson Hillel Community Upper School, which includes grades nine through twelve.
