= Stashover-Slipia Congregation =

- Location in Toronto

Religion
- Affiliation: Judaism
- Rite: Nusach Sefard
- Leadership: Cantor Rachael Littman
- Status: Active

Location
- Location: 11 Sultana Avenue, Toronto, Ontario, M6A 1S9
- Country: Canada
- Interactive map of Stashover-Slipia Congregation
- Coordinates: 43°43′42″N 79°25′57″W

Architecture
- Type: Synagogue
- Established: 1910 (congregation); 1964 (building)

Website
- www.stashoverslipia.org

The Stashover-Slipia Congregation is a halachically progressive traditional unaffiliated Jewish congregation in the North York district of Toronto, Ontario, Canada. The current congregation is a merger of two of the oldest congregations in Toronto - Anshei Stashov (founded 1905) and Chevra Knesseth Israel Anshei Slipia (founded 1908).

== History ==
By 1910, there were 18,000 Jews in Toronto, an over 500% increase in one decade. Among the thousands who poured in fleeing pogroms and poverty were men, and sometimes families, from two small Polish shtetlach of Staszow and Slipi. Unable to speak English, they clustered in areas that other Jews frequented. Life was not easy for these immigrants. Some found work as peddlers, others as tailors or small scale businessmen.

To ease the loneliness, people from the same town - called landsleit in Yiddish - sought each other. They tried hard to rebuild a new life in a cold city that did not care much for Jews or other immigrants. For many, one of the best ways to recreate a small part of what they had left behind was to form a small synagogue, commonly called a shul.

By 1910, each organization had officially created one, often meeting in a series of temporary quarters. These small congregational homes served functions beyond prayer. They were meeting places, a small "piece of der alte Heim" (their homes in Poland) where they could converse in Yiddish, read letters from home to each other, talk about their "Canadian" children who were doing so well at school, and boast of how their hard earned incomes were being used to bring in more family members. The onset of the First World War stopped immigration for a while, but the gates of Canada reopened, albeit more reluctantly, in the 1920s, thus allowing the small congregations to continue growing.

As the congregations grew and felt more secure, they purchased houses - the Stashover on Dundas Street near Spadina and the Slipia on Oxford Street - and, in 1964, converted them into shuls. Rabbi Graubart arrived from Staszow shortly after the war. He was a respected and learned man who authored books on Jewish law, opened a Yeshiva, became Principal of the Eitz Chaim School on D'Arcy Street, and a source of pride to his congregants. Their pride was such that even the economic challenges of the Depression could not close congregational doors.

But the shadow of the Shoah fell across the communities, and indeed upon all Canadian Jewry. In 1945 the awful truth became clear: both Staszow and Slipi were Judenrein—emptied of Jews after centuries of residence. A few souls and few families, remnants of far larger clans, trickled into Toronto and joined their landsleit. They arrived just as the Jewish community began to move northwards into the suburbs. By the early 1960s both the Stashover and Slipia Congregations found downtown membership dwindling. The Stashover moved first—to the building we occupy today on Sultana Avenue. They were joined a few years later by the Slipia Congregation. Through the 1960s and 1970s, the shul thrived in the vibrant centre of Toronto Jewish life.

But as the numbers of the second generation members dwindled, and their children attended less often, a slow decline began. Services fell from twice a day to twice a week, and "waiting for minyan" - the 10 men needed to make a quorum for public prayer - became frequent on Shabbat. Something had to be done.

And it was. In 2007 the older generation generously and willingly called upon their successors to take over their legacy. Together, both generations, aided by new members attracted by our traditional friendly and familial atmosphere, reinvigorated the congregation.

== Services ==
Today the Stashover-Slipia Congregation holds services Shabbat mornings, Sunday mornings and on Yom Tov (holiday).

The congregation uses the Birnbaum prayer book. There is family seating and women may receive aliyot (be called to the Torah for readings).

== See also ==
- List of Yeshivas and Midrashas in Israel
- List of Jewish Communities in the United States and Canada
- History of the Jews and Judaism in the Land of Israel
