= Beth Joseph Synagogue =

Former synagogue, now museum, in ustate New York, US

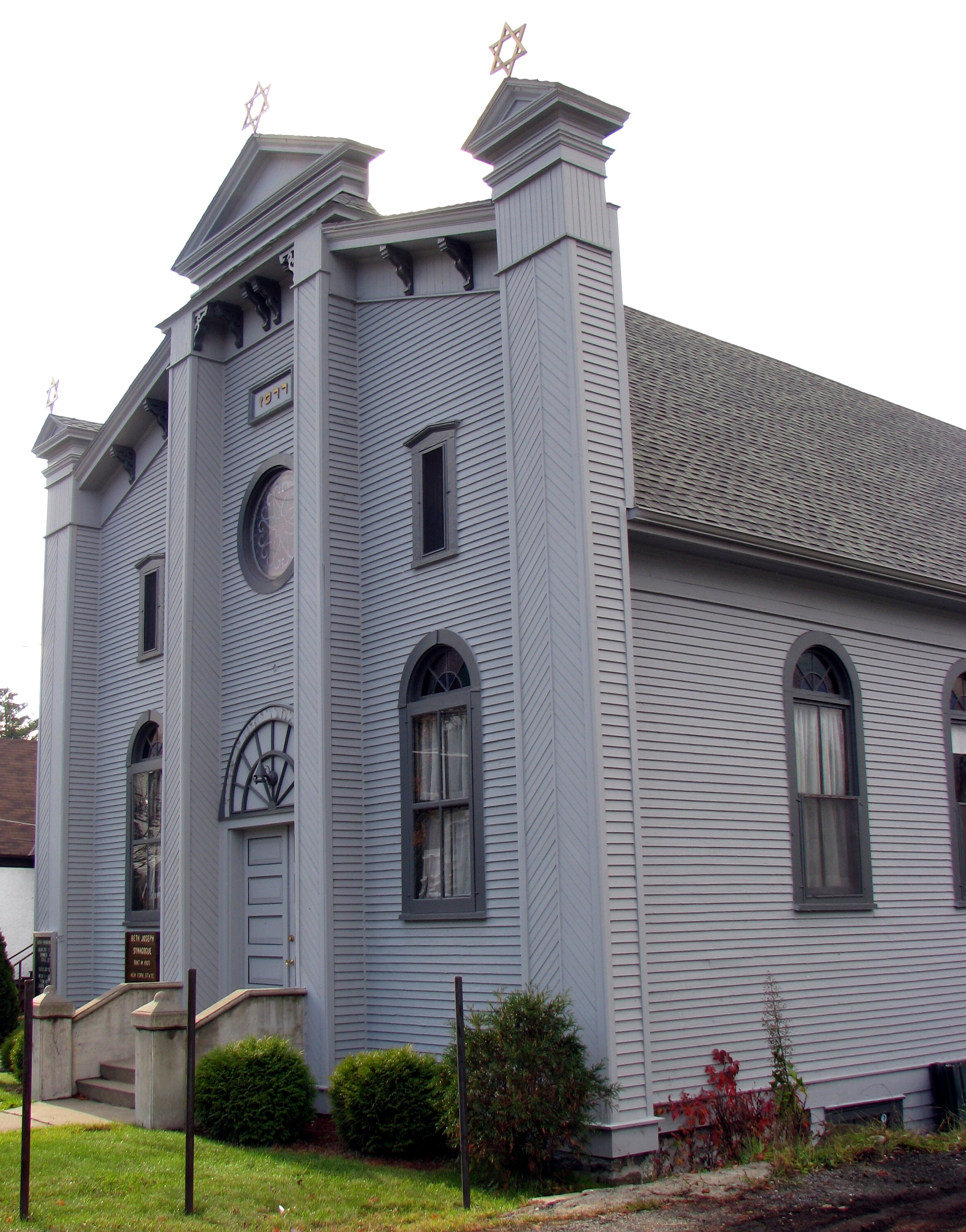
- The synagogue, in 2008

- Location in the Adirondacks, New York

Religion
- Affiliation: Judaism
- Rite: Nusach Ashkenaz
- Ecclesiastical or organizational status: Synagogue; Jewish museum
- Status: Active (summer only)

Location
- Location: 59 Lake Street, Tupper Lake, New York 12986
- Country: United States
- Interactive map of Beth Joseph Synagogue
- Coordinates: 44°13′29″N 74°27′55″W

Architecture
- Type: Synagogue architecture
- Style: Italianate
- Established: c. 1890s (as a congregation)
- Completed: 1905
- Materials: Clapboard; timber frame

Website
- bethjosephtupperlake.org
- Beth Joseph Synagogue
- U.S. National Register of Historic Places
- Area: less than one acre
- NRHP reference No.: 88001441
- Added to NRHP: September 1, 1988

Beth Joseph Synagogue is a Jewish congregation and historic synagogue, located in Tupper Lake, Franklin County, New York, in the United States. The synagogue is open only in the summer months; and it houses a small Jewish museum. The congregation has traditionally practiced in the Ashkenazi rite.

== History ==
As a congregation, Beth Joseph was established in the late 1800s by Yiddish–speaking Eastern European Jewish immigrants, including those from Russia and Lithuania, who were peddlers, and wealthy German Jews from New York City, who took summer vacations in the area. By 1899 the Jewish community acquired land to build a synagogue and in the summer of that year, before construction began, a major fire devastated many of buildings in Tupper Lake. The new synagogue building, completed in 1906, was part of a building resurgence.

Decling membership forced the synagogue to close in 1963, and it was restored and reopened from the mid-1980s, for summer services only.

It is the oldest congregation in the Adirondack Mountains and is the only surviving early synagogue in the region. The synagogue building was added to the National Register of Historic Places in 1988.

== Architecture ==
The synagogue building was built in 1906, and is a 2 1/2-story, three-bay by five-bay, vernacular Italianate style frame building. It is sheathed in clapboard and has a false front that hides a steep gable roof. The front façade features a "sun dial" arch and rose window, round arched windows, and square corner towers.

The synagogue appears to have been influenced by the Italianate and Romanesque Revival Wooster Street Synagogue in Lower Manhattan, which, like Beth Joseph, featured a peaked parapet at the center of a tripartite facade with round-arched doors and a round window in the center. This style had become a popular prototype for synagogues. The exterior's horizontal clapboard siding contrasted with a characteristically Adirondack interior arrangement of pine and hemlock strips in diagonal, herringbone and perpendicular patterns.
