= Bais Moshe =

Jewish high school and seminary located in Scranton, PA

Coordinates: 41.394908°N 75.656096°W

Yeshivath Bais Moshe
- Type: Yeshiva
- Religious affiliation: Haredi Orthodox
- Undergraduates: 78
- Location: Scranton, Pennsylvania, United States

Yeshiva Bais Moshe (also referred to as Yeshivath Beth Moshe, Yeshiva Beth Moshe, Scranton Yeshiva, or Milton Eisner Yeshiva High School), is a Haredi (ultra-Orthodox) Jewish High School and Seminary (yeshiva) in Scranton, Pennsylvania. It was founded in 1965

Yeshiva Bais Moshe is an all-male school. It comprises a high school and a collegiate-level seminary Beis Midrash. About 80 students between ages 14 and 18 attend the high school, while about 50 students between the ages of 19 and 23 attend the seminary.

The campus, located in the South Side of Scranton, had two buildings. The main building contains the Beis Midrash study and prayer hall, classrooms, dining area, library, and dormitory. The other building contained a dormitory and a kosher grocery. It was torn down in 2024 to make way for the new building, which is currently under construction.
