= Congregation Ner Tamid =

Synagogue in Rancho Palos Verdes, California

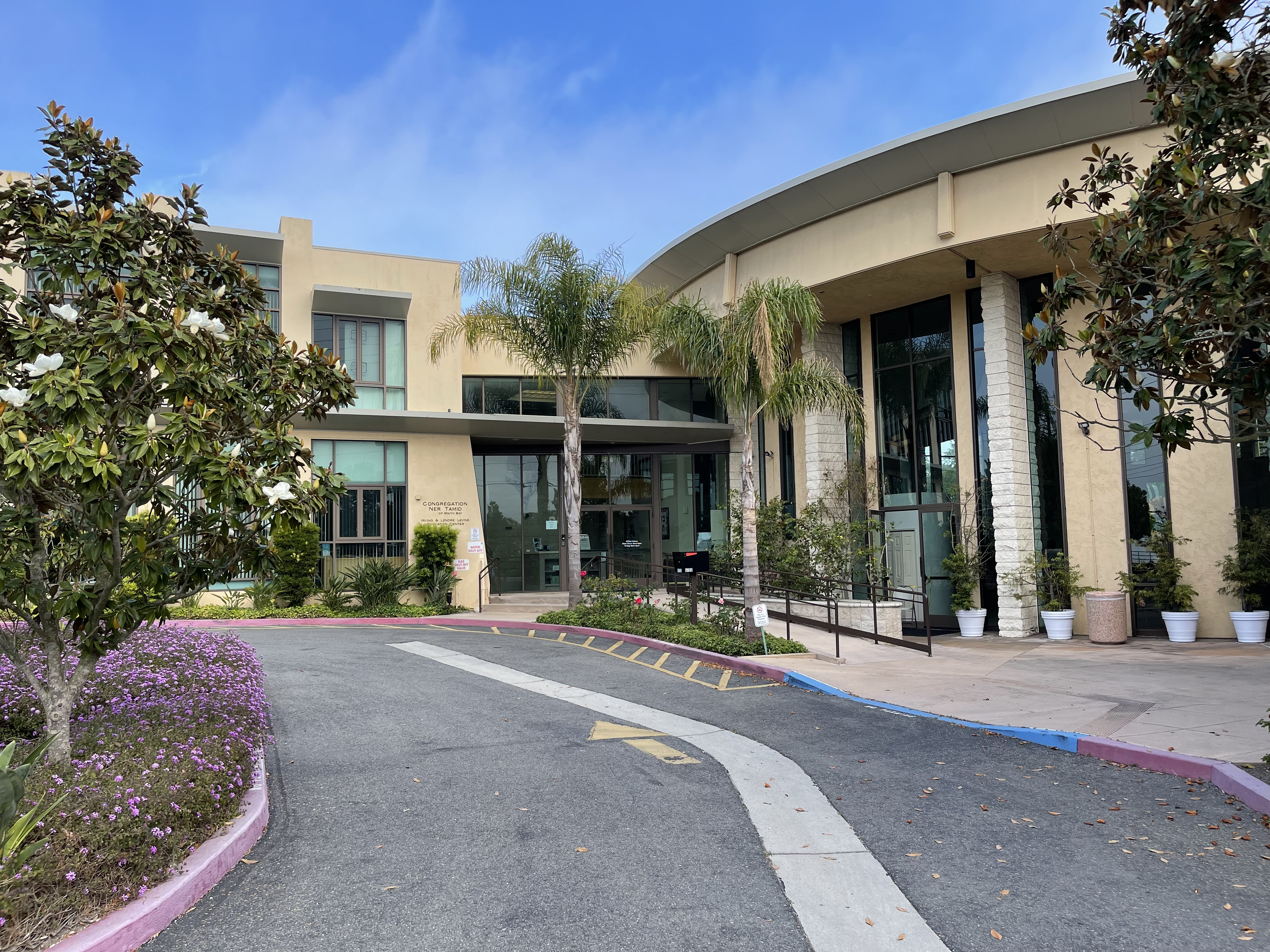
- The synagogue building, in 2022

- Location within Los Angeles

Religion
- Affiliation: Conservative Judaism
- Ecclesiastical or organisational status: Synagogue
- Leadership: Rabbi Tzvi Graetz
- Status: Active

Location
- Location: 5721 Crestridge Rd, Rancho Palos Verdes, Los Angeles, California
- Country: United States
- Coordinates: 33°46′7″N 118°22′36″W

Architecture
- Established: 1961 (as a congregation)
- Completed: 1978 (building)

Website
- www.nertamid.com

Congregation Ner Tamid, officially Congregation Ner Tamid of South Bay, is a Conservative Jewish congregation and synagogue, located at 5721 Crestridge Road, Rancho Palos Verdes, Los Angeles, California, in the United States.

The clergy includes Rabbi Tzvi Graetz, Cantor Ken Jaffe, and Cantor Emeritus Samuel Radwine.

The congregation conducts adult education, preschool and United Synagogue Youth programs.

== History ==
For almost sixteen years, Congregation Ner Tamid members held services in people's homes and later in rented spaces. Finally, in 1977, the synagogue purchased a piece of land to build a permanent structure. Congregation Ner Tamid's building was one of the first structures to be built on the then-new Crestridge Road. Consequently, the community was able to pick its own numbered address. The number 5721 was selected because this was the Jewish (lunar) year that corresponds to 1961 on the solar calendar, which is the year that the synagogue was founded.

== Education ==
The synagogue includes David's School Preschool and Early Childhood Center and CLaL religious school. The religious school includes special programs for kindergarten up to seventh grade, and another for eighth to tenth grade. The preschool meets daily in the mornings and early afternoons. The religious school (which is called "CLaL" or "Children Learning and Living in Jewish Community") meets Sunday mornings and on weekday afternoons (4 p.m. – 6 p.m.). All grades (except seventh grade) meet on Sundays. In addition, the older grades meet on either Mondays and Wednesdays or Tuesdays and Thursdays, depending on the session for which the student has signed up. (Thus, the students in the older grades attend three days each week.) The seventh graders also meet on either Mondays and Wednesdays or Tuesdays and Thursdays. However, instead of coming on Sundays, they come to religious services every Shabbat (Saturday).

The CLAL program ends after seventh grade. However, students in grades eight to ten have the option to continue their religious education through USY High School, which meets Wednesday nights, 6 p.m. – 8 p.m. Alternatively, students may attend courses from Los Angeles Hebrew High School, which meets at Ner Tamid on Wednesday nights and at Pierce College on Sundays.

Congregation Ner Tamid also offers extensive adult education programs and classes, as well as Senior Programming with weekly exercise classes and special excursions to museums, theaters, and other places of interest.

== Notable members ==
- Erik Lorig (born 1986), NFL football tight end and fullback
