= Temple Israel (Ottawa) =

Reform synagogue in Ottawa, Ontario

- Location in Ottawa

Religion
- Affiliation: Reform Judaism
- Ecclesiastical or organizational status: Synagogue
- Leadership: Rabbi Daniel Mikelberg
- Status: Active

Location
- Location: 1301 Prince of Wales Drive, Ottawa, Ontario K2C 1N2
- Country: Canada
- Interactive map of Temple Israel
- Administration: Union for Reform Judaism
- Coordinates: 45.37160°N 75.70634°W

Website
- www.templeisraelottawa.ca

Temple Israel is a Reform synagogue, located in Ottawa, Ontario, Canada. The synagogue is home to the second largest congregation in Ottawa, with approximately 340 families, and has a supplementary religious school.

== History ==
Temple Israel Congregation, which was the first reform congregation in Ottawa, was founded in the spring of 1966. The first consecration service was held on October 28, 1967 at the Histadrut Centre. From September, 1971-October 1972, the congregation had its first permanent home in the former B’nai Jacob Synagogue on 54 James Street. The building, which had been renovated by Temple Israel, was badly damaged by fire in 1972. Services were held from 1972-1975 in the Montefiore Club, the Jewish Community Centre, 151 Chapel Street and the Unitarian Congregation. In 1975, Temple Israel held High Holiday services in a newly designed synagogue building on Prince of Wales Drive. David Powell was the rabbi from 1967 to 1972, and was followed by Donald Gerber until 1980, Irwin A. Tanenbaum from 1986 to 1994, and Steven Garten from 1995-2014, Norman Klein as interim rabbi 2014-2015, and S. Robert Morais from 2015, and Rabbi Daniel Mikelberg since 2019.

== Liberal Judaism Library ==
The Liberal Judaism Library is a volunteer library run on the honour system which includes a reference collection, adult fiction and non-fiction collections, a children's collection and the books published by Union of American Hebrew Congregations (UAHC) and Central Conference of American Rabbis (CCAR).

== School education ==
Temple Israel Religious School (TIRS) is the largest synagogue-affiliated supplemental school in Ottawa, and has students from Junior Kindergarten through Bar/Bat Mitzvah, to high school and confirmation.
