= Yeshiva Zichron Yaakov =

Coordinates: 41.142209°N 74.054331°W

- ישיבה זכרון יעקב
- New Hempstead, New York; United States

Information
- Type: Private, Jewish
- Motto: Torah U'Mussar (unofficial)
- Established: 1999
- Closed: 2013

Yeshiva Zichron Yaakov (Hebrew: ישיבה זכרון יעקב) was an all-male Jewish Orthodox high school located in New Hempstead, New York which operated under the direction and leadership of Rabbi Eliyahu Maza and, for several years, Secular Studies Principal Rabbi Benyamin Plotzker. It closed in 2013.

== History ==
Frequently referred to as "Chofetz Chaim of Monsey," Yeshiva Zichron Yaakov was founded in 1999 and graduated its first class in 2003. According to some reports, attendance peaked at around 70 in 2005. Enrollment fell to a modest 40 students per year on average in the school's later years. It ran its high school program until 2013.

== Affiliation ==
The school was an affiliate of the Rabbinical Seminary of America, (which is more commonly known as Chofetz Chaim). As such, its curriculum and ideals matched those of the Chofetz Chaim Yeshivas.

== Curriculum ==
The school combined a traditional Lithuanian-style Yeshiva schedule in the morning with a notable General Studies program in the afternoon to provide a proper education to its students.

=== Judaic studies ===
The primary portion of the Judaic Studies curriculum was study of the Babylonian Talmud. Mussar study was considered paramount, and the study of the book Chofetz Chaim was highly recommended by the school. The Judaic Studies program also consisted of Halacha and Tanakh. (Study of the Hebrew Language was part of the General Studies program.)

=== General studies ===
The typical student in the school took all the required Regents Examinations by the conclusion of four years of schooling: English, two courses in Mathematics, two Sciences (usually Biology and Chemistry), two History courses (World History and Geography and U.S. History and Government), and one foreign language.

== Alumni ==
Most (if not all) Yeshiva Zichron Yaakov graduates continued their studies upon graduation at more advanced yeshivas and/or universities.
