= Sons of Jacob Synagogue =

Synagogue in Providence, Rhode Island, US

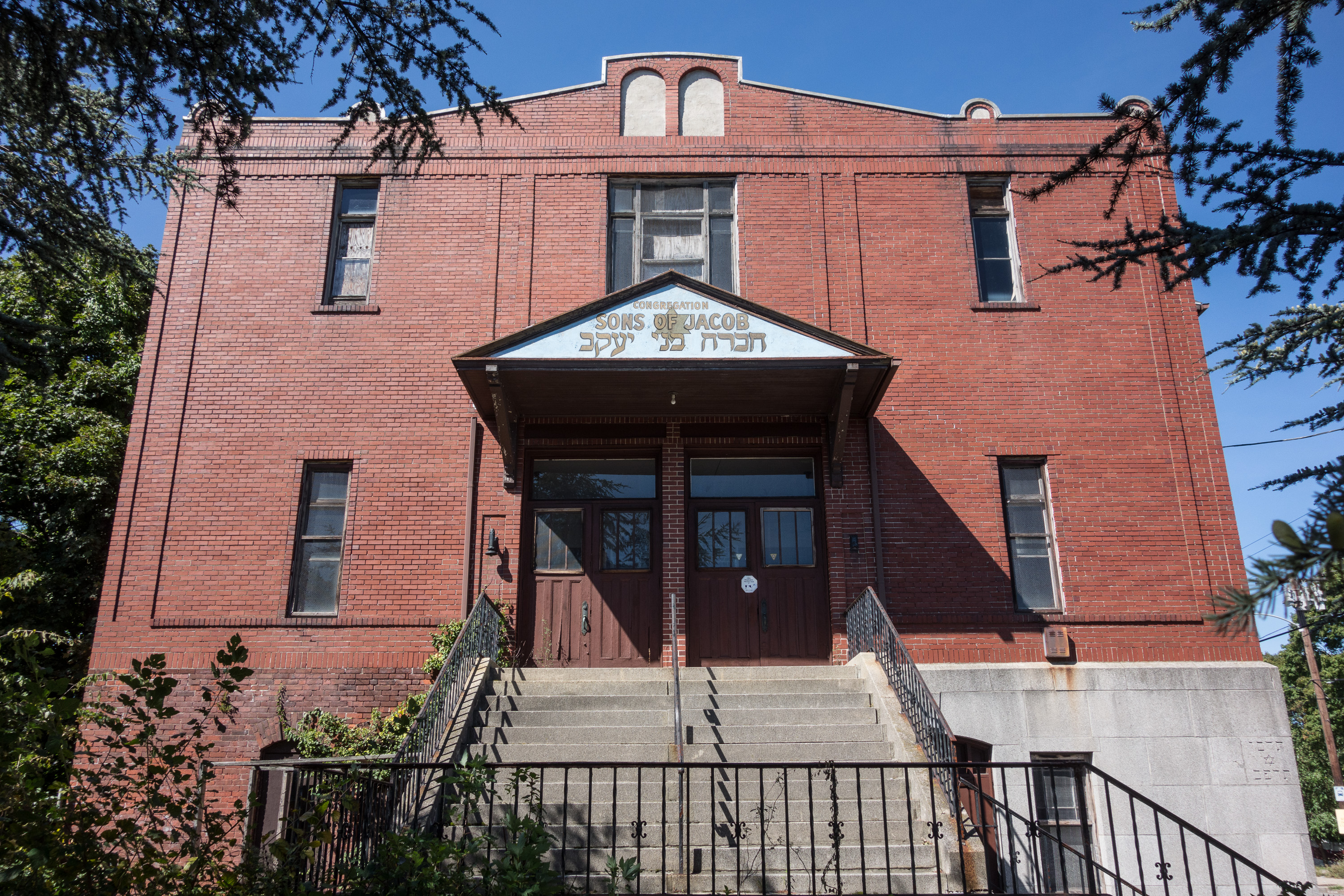
- The synagogue, in 2016

- Location in Rhode Island

Religion
- Affiliation: Orthodox Judaism
- Ecclesiastical or organisational status: Synagogue; Jewish museum
- Leadership: Lay–led
- Status: Active

Location
- Location: 24 Douglas Avenue, Providence, Rhode Island 02908
- Country: United States
- Coordinates: 41°50′06″N 71°25′02″W

Architecture
- Architect: Harry Marshak (1926)
- Type: Synagogue architecture
- Style: Late 19th And 20th Century Revivals
- Established: 1896 (as a congregation)
- Completed: 1906; 1926
- Construction cost: $50,000
- Direction of façade: East

Website
- sonsofjacobsynagogue.net
- Sons of Jacob Synagogue
- U.S. National Register of Historic Places
- NRHP reference No.: 89001152
- Added to NRHP: August 24, 1989

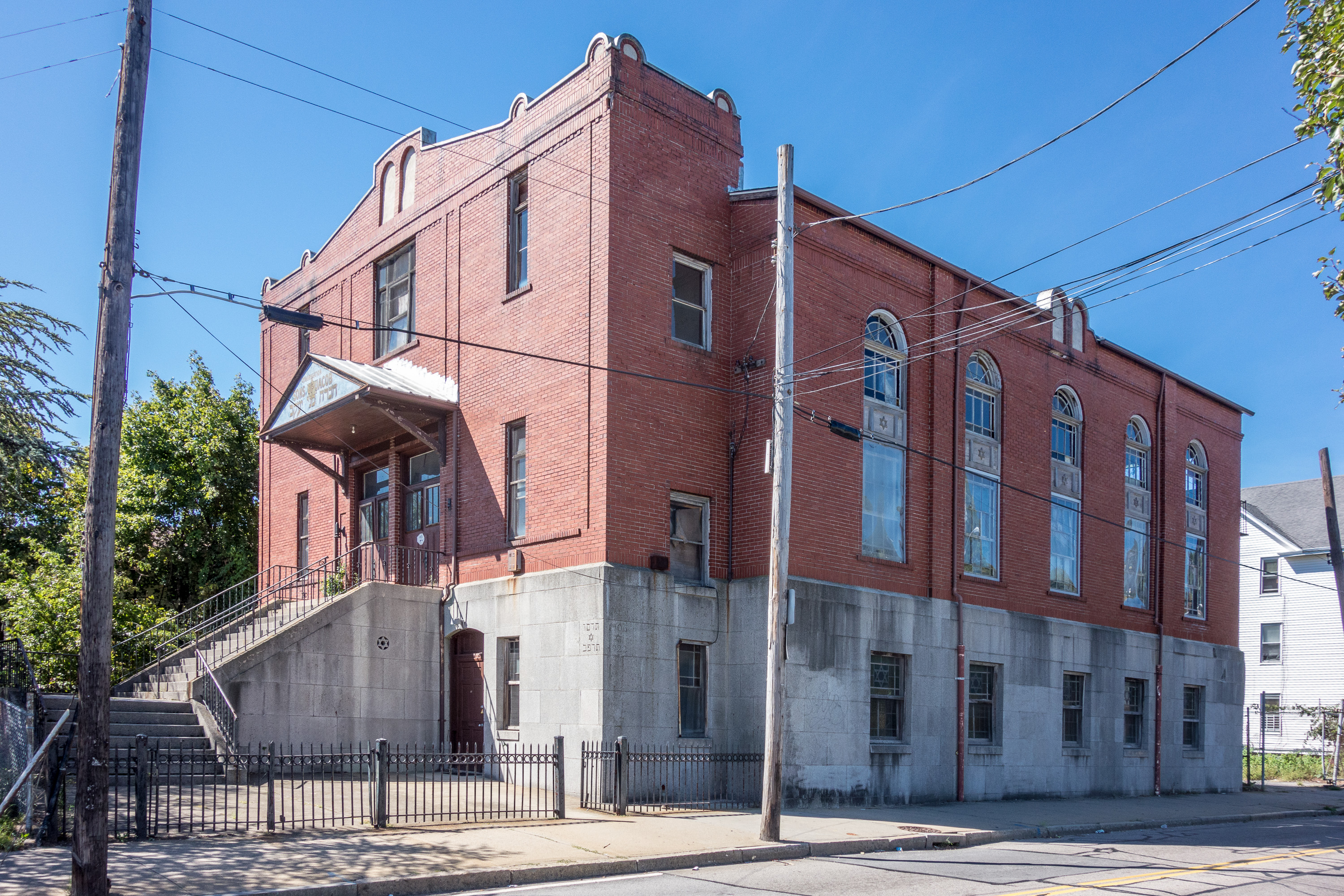
Another view

The Sons of Jacob Synagogue, officially Congregation Sons of Jacob, is an Orthodox Jewish congregation and historic synagogue and Jewish museum, located at 24 Douglas Avenue in Providence, Rhode Island, in the United States.

The congregation was founded in 1896 by Orthodox Jews who fled from the pogroms in Russia and Poland, who met initially in a house on Shawmut Street, in Providence. The congregation moved to their Douglas Avenue synagogue in 1906, expanded it in the 1920s, and appointed their first rabbi in 1926. An exit from the Interstate 95 was subsequently located adjacent to the synagogue building.

== Building ==
It is a two-story brick structure, set on a raised basement. The main façade is three bays wide, with a pair of entry doors sheltered by a simple gable-roof portico. The building was constructed in two stages, 1906 and 1926, and is the major surviving remnant of what was once a large Jewish community in the Smith Hill neighborhood of Providence. The first stage of the building, its lower level, housed the congregation until it could raise funds to build the upper level, and was then used as a shul. The upper level was designed by Harry Marshak, a self-taught architect and builder born to immigrant Russian Jews, who was likely the first Jewish architect to work in the Providence area.

The building was listed on the National Register of Historic Places in 1989.

With the building starting to fall into disrepairs, in 2016 the synagogue was placed on the Providence Preservation Society's Most Endangered Properties List. Part of the building has been used as a Jewish museum since c. 2017. In 2023 it was estimated that $5.2 million was required to fully restore the synagogue building.

== See also ==
- National Register of Historic Places listings in Providence, Rhode Island
