= Mesivta Zichron Baruch =

Yeshiva high school in Passaic County, New Jersey, United States

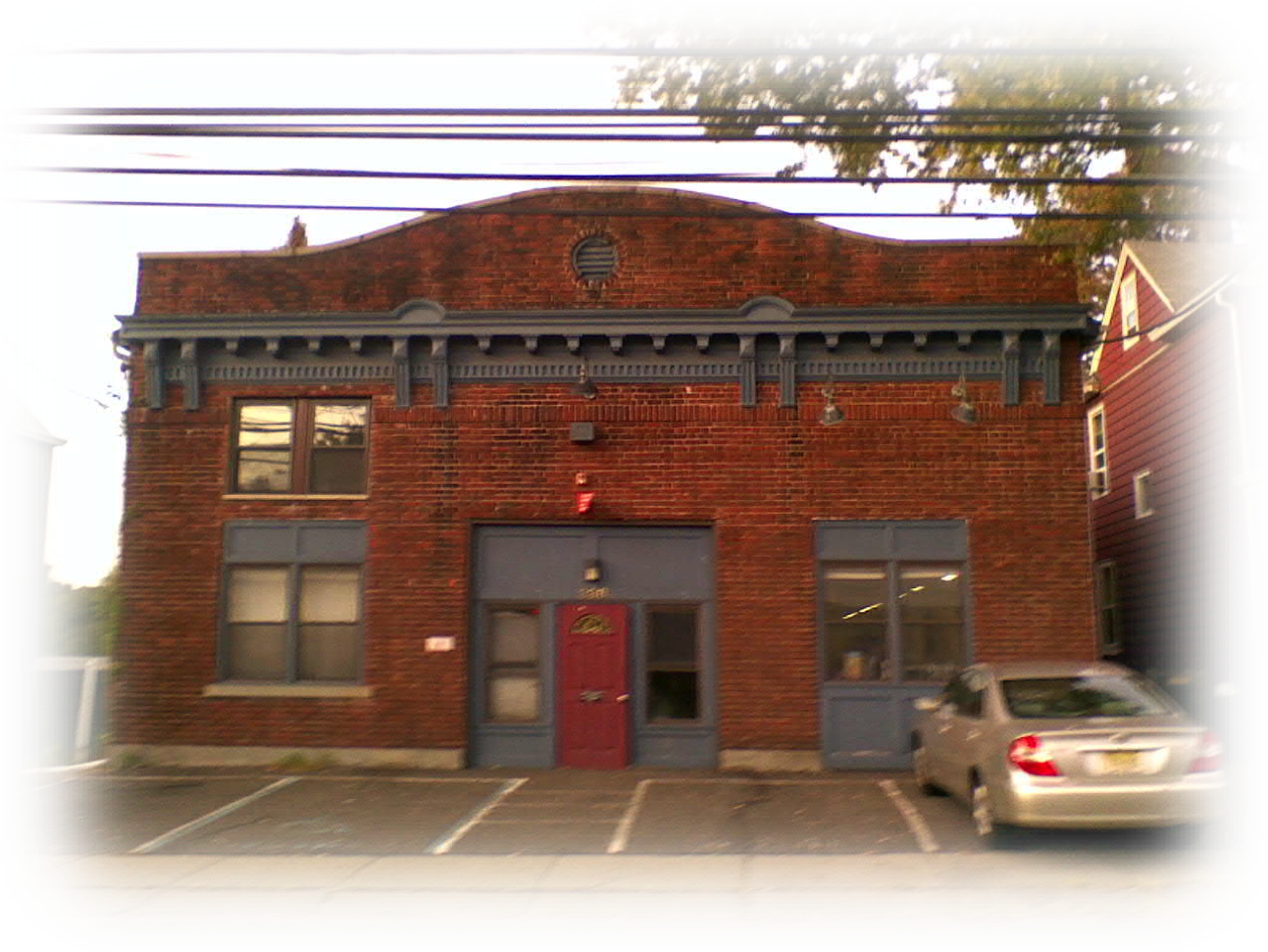
- Front view of building

Location
- 338 Delawanna Avenue; Clifton, Passaic County, New Jersey 07012; United States
- 40.834189°N 74.135573°W

Information
- Type: Private
- Religious affiliation: Orthodox Jewish
- Established: 2007
- NCES School ID: A0902180
- Faculty: 11.8 FTEs
- Grades: 9–12
- Enrollment: 63 (as of 2017–18)
- Student to teacher ratio: 5.3:1

Mesivta Zichron Baruch, (Hebrew: מתיבתא זכרון ברוך), established in 2007 and, also known as Mesivta of Clifton, is an Orthodox Jewish high school in Clifton, New Jersey led by Rabbi Halberstadt.

As of the 2017–18 school year, the school had an enrollment of 63 students and 11.8 classroom teachers (on an FTE basis), for a student–teacher ratio of 5.3:1. The school's student body was 100% White.

== Location ==
The school occupies a two-story brick building (originally built as a fire station) at 338 Delawanna Avenue. The mesivta purchased this property for $900,000 from The Jewish Education Alliance in July 2007.
