= Congregation B'nai Torah =

Synagogue in Georgia, USA

- Location in Georgia

Religion
- Affiliation: Conservative Judaism
- Ecclesiastical or organizational status: Synagogue
- Leadership: Rabbi Joshua Heller; Rabbi Hillel Konigsberg; Rabbi Elizabeth Breit
- Status: Active

Location
- Location: 700 Mt. Vernon Highway, Sandy Springs, Georgia 30328
- Country: United States
- Interactive map of Congregation B'nai Torah
- Coordinates: 33°56′36.16″N 84°21′34.73″W

Architecture
- Established: 1981 (as a congregation)
- Completed: 1984

Website
- bnaitorah.org

Congregation B'nai Torah is a Conservative synagogue located in Sandy Springs, Georgia, in the United States. It was founded in 1981 by young, unaffiliated Jews who had attended the Hillel High holiday services at Emory University since the 1970s. The 125 member families met in a closed grammar school until 1984, and then for two years in trailers, until they constructed a synagogue building.

== Overview ==
The congregation was highly unusual, as it was founded as an Orthodox shul, but without a mechitza. Because of the challenge of being an independent synagogue, it gradually moved towards the Conservative movement, first identifying as "traditional" ("Conservadox") and then finally affiliating with the Conservative movement in November 2003. Soon after, the synagogue completed a transition to an egalitarian practice, with women now integrated into all ritual roles.

B'nai Torah hired its first Conservative-ordained rabbi, Joshua Heller, in 2004. At the time, membership was approximately 420 families. As of June 2009, that had grown to 660, by July 2015, it had reached 750, and in 2023 its members included over 850 families. As of November 2023, B'nai Torah's clergy team included Rabbi Heller, Rabbi Hillel Konigsberg, and Rabbi Elizabeth Breit.

The present location on 700 Mount Vernon Highway contains a large sanctuary, a gift shop, meat and dairy kosher kitchens, a religious school, and a preschool, all of which were renovated in 2014–2015. The congregation also maintains an eruv around surrounding neighborhoods. B'nai Torah hosts many community organizations and events, including MACoM, the Metro Atlanta Community mikvah was constructed on its campus in 2015.
