= Congregation Beth Ora (Saint Laurent) =

- Hebrew: קהלת בית אורה, lit. 'House of Light'
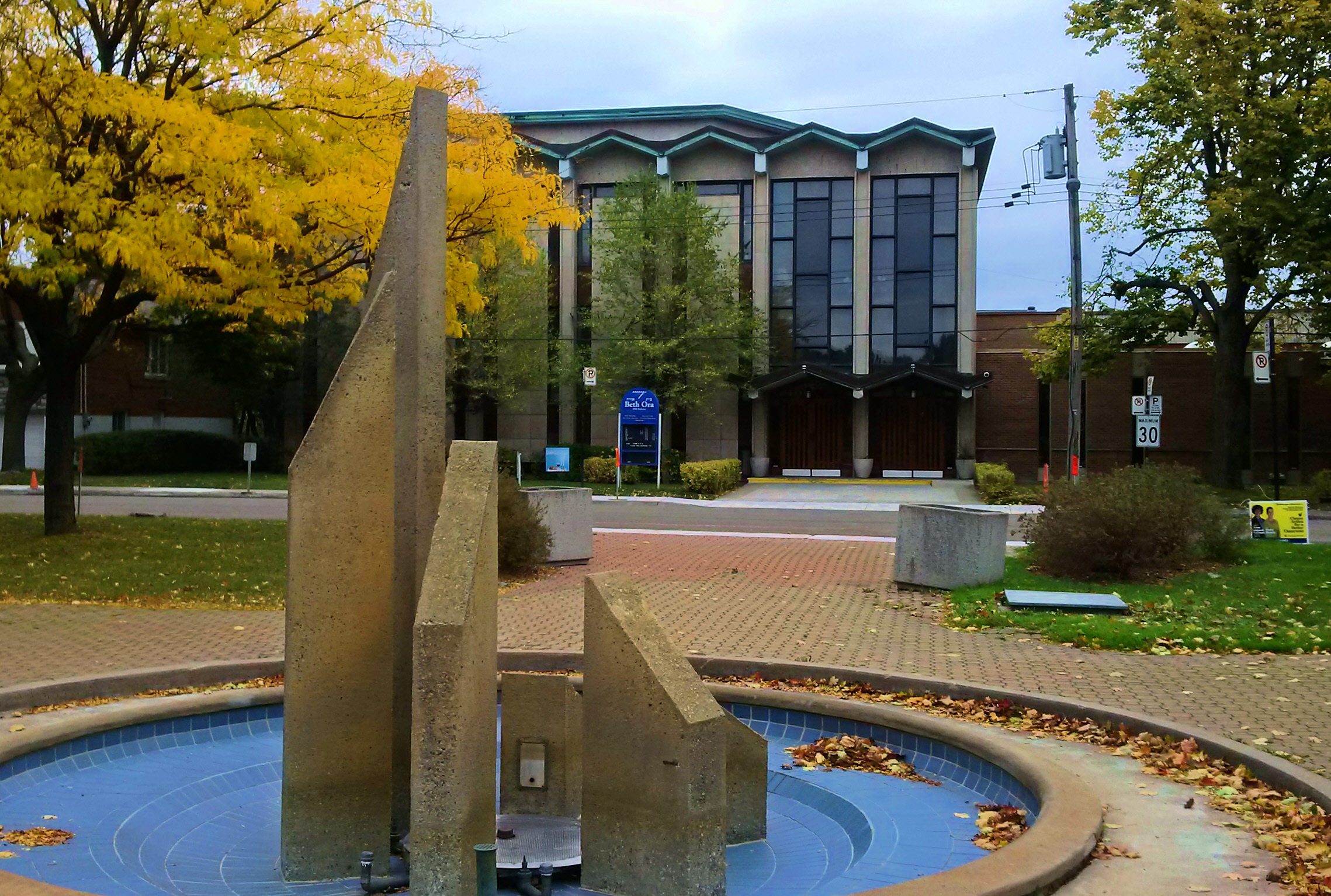
- Congregation Beth Ora, Saint-Laurent

Religion
- Affiliation: Modern Orthodox Judaism
- Sect: Ashkenazi
- Ecclesiastical or organizational status: Synagogue
- Governing body: Orthodox Union
- Leadership: Rabbi Anthony Knopf
- Status: Active

Location
- Location: Saint-Laurent, Montreal, Quebec
- Country: Canada
- Interactive map of Congregation Beth Ora
- Coordinates: 45.4971°N 73.6886°W

Architecture
- Established: 1953
- Completed: 1957

Website
- www.bethora.org

Congregation Beth Ora (Hebrew: קהלת בית אורה, lit. 'House of Light') is a Modern Orthodox synagogue serving the Ashkenazi Jewish community in Saint-Laurent, Quebec, Canada.

Founded in 1953 by William Weiss as "The Jewish Congregation of Saint Laurent", the synagogue adopted its constitution in 1956, and construction was finalized in 1957. The name was later changed to Beth Ora in 1959.

The synagogue is a member of the Orthodox Union.
