= Heichal HaTorah =

Orthodox Jewish yeshiva high school in Teaneck, New Jersey

- ישיבת היכל התורה

Location
- 70 Sterling Place, Teaneck, New Jersey; United States
- 40.8857°N 74.0089°W

Information
- Type: Private
- Religious affiliation: Orthodox Judaism
- Established: 2013
- Founders: Aryeh Stechler; Avi Goldenberg; Yehuda Jacoby
- Rosh yeshiva: Aryeh Stechler
- Principal of Judaic studies: Dovid Goldman
- Faculty: 24
- Grades: 9 – 12
- Gender: Male
- Enrollment: 221
- Student to teacher ratio: 8:1
- Sports: Basketball; baseball; softball; football
- Team name: Hornets
- Website: heichalhatorah.org

Yeshivas Heichal HaTorah is an Orthodox Jewish yeshiva high school located in Teaneck, New Jersey. The institution owns and operates the Jewish Center of Teaneck, where it is located. Heichal is unaffiliated with Israeli yeshivas under the same name.

== History ==
Heichal HaTorah was established by Rabbi Aryeh Stechler, Mr. Avi Goldenberg, and Mr. Yehuda Jacoby. The group met in the autumn of 2012 to establish a yeshiva high school that would open in the fall of 2013. Their objective was to create an institution that combines a classic yeshiva schedule to sufficiently develop students' Torah studies with a rigorous secular studies department to give them the skillset needed for college and the professional workplace. Heichal HaTorah greeted its first class of 17 students on September 4, 2013. It graduated its first class on June 14, 2017. The school has an enrollment of 221 students. In 2017, the school introduced a Tikvah Humanities curriculum into its general studies courses. The course, in partnership with the Tikvah Fund, an educational foundation in New York, implements a neo-classical historical and literary curriculum.

== Campus ==
In 2016, Heichal HaTorah moved into its present location at the Jewish Center of Teaneck facility, located at 70 Sterling Place in Teaneck, New Jersey. Special events are held in the school's ballroom. The school hosts a townwide Simchat Beit HaShoeivah (lit. 'Rejoicing of the Water-drawing House') celebration on its campus each year during the Sukkot holiday.

== Curriculum ==
Heichal HaTorah students embark on a two-fold course of study familiar to them from their time in day school. On the one hand, there is a regimen of Judaic studies, with particular emphasis being placed on the Hebrew Bible and Talmud. The latter's importance can be seen from Heichal's encouragement of their students to complete the study of the scheduled masekhet (tractate) over the summer recess, with a subsequent siyum (lit. 'completion') celebration being held for them after the start of the fall semester, during Sukkot. In addition to the above, the school offers a full academic studies program (including some STEM subjects) such as biology, mathematics, English, history, business and finance.

== Programs ==
=== Athletic ===
Heichal HaTorah sponsors its own varsity and junior varsity (JV) basketball and softball teams known as the Heichal Hornets. In 2018, the Heichal Hornets won the NCYI JV Basketball League championship. On May 23, 2022, Heichal JV athlete Sachi Zauderer shot a game-winning 3-pointer in the championships, making it to ESPN's SportCenter Top 10.

=== Vehaer Eineinu ===
Vehaer Eineinu (lit. 'Enlighten our eyes'/enlighten us) is a program spearheaded by Heichal's mashgiach ruchani (spiritual guidance counselor) Rabbi Reuven Tzvi Schwechter. The program is focused on incentivizing students to limit their screen time in order to enhance their spiritual lives. The program consists of three tiers, encompassing 4 hours, 8 hours, and 12 hours per week of screen time respectively. There are engaging raffles and programs on a weekly, monthly and yearly basis. The Vehaer Eineinu website can be viewed at hhve.org and was developed by Vascad Marketing

== Leadership ==
- Rabbi Aryeh Stechler, rosh yeshiva
- Rabbi Dovid Goldman, Menahel (principal) of Judaic studies
- Rabbi Dr. Joshua Strulowitz, director of faculty advancements

=== Former ===
- Rabbi Maccabee Avishur, academic dean and principal of general studies
- Rabbi Avi Oberlander (died in 2024), former Menahel (principal) of Judaic studies
- Dr. Seth Taylor, academic dean of students
