= Tephereth Israel Synagogue =

Historic Reform synagogue in New Britain, Connecticut, US

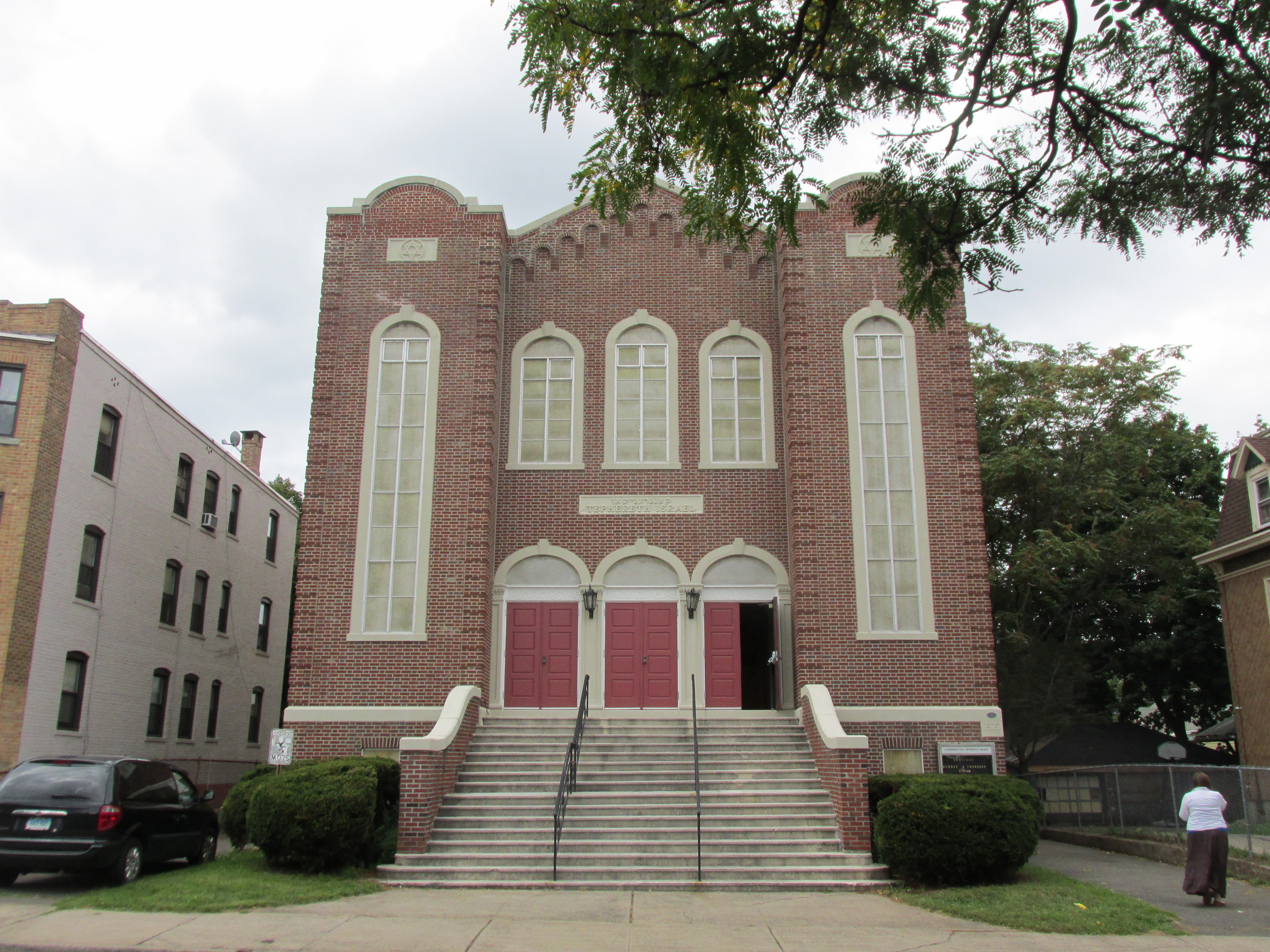
- Tephereth Israel Synagogue, in 2013

- Location in Connecticut

Religion
- Affiliation: Orthodox Judaism
- Ecclesiastical or organizational status: Synagogue
- Leadership: Lay-led
- Status: Active

Location
- Location: 76 Winter Street, New Britain, Connecticut 06051
- Country: United States
- Interactive map of Tephereth Israel Synagogue
- Coordinates: 41°40′19″N 72°46′44″W

Architecture
- Architects: Adolph Feinberg; Levio Bessoni
- Type: Synagogue
- Style: Romanesque Revival; Colonial Revival
- Established: 1925 (as a congregation)
- Completed: 1925
- Materials: Masonry; red brick

Website
- tephereth.org
- Tephereth Israel Synagogue
- U.S. National Register of Historic Places
- Area: less than one acre
- MPS: Historic Synagogues of Connecticut MPS
- NRHP reference No.: 95000576
- Added to NRHP: May 11, 1995

Tephereth Israel Synagogue (transliterated from Hebrew as "The Glory of Israel"), is an Orthodox Jewish congregation and synagogue, located at 76 Winter Street in downtown New Britain, Connecticut, in the United States. The congregation, founded in 1925, meets at a two-story brick temple with Romanesque Revival and Colonial Revival features, designed by Hartford architect Adolf Feinberg and built in 1925.

The building was listed on the National Register of Historic Places in 1995 as part of a multiple property listing of fifteen historic synagogues in Connecticut.

== Architecture and history ==
Tephereth Israel Synagogue is located a few blocks northeast of downtown New Britain, on the north side of Winter Street west of Martin Luther King Jr. Drive. It is a two-story masonry structure, built out of red brick with stone trim. Square towers flank a central entry section, which has three entrances at the top of a broad series of steps. The entrances are set in round-arch openings with keystones, as are the windows set above them. The towers have brick corner quoining, with tall round-arch windows, above which are stone panels bearing the Star of David. The interior is arranged with a social hall and classroom space on the ground floor, and the main sanctuary on the upper level. The fixtures of the sanctuary date to the period after a 1962 fire. Services are usually conducted every Saturday morning, led by Rabbi Robert Schectman.

The synagogue was built in 1925, following a doctrinal split in New Britain's Jewish community. The city's first congregation, Ahey B'Nai Israel, was formally adopted as a Conservative organization, and more recently arrived Orthodox adherents broke off to form Tephereth Israel. The building is an architecturally distinctive blend of Romanesque and Colonial Revival features.

Tephereth Israel Synagogue was one of fifteen Connecticut synagogues added to the National Register of Historic Places in 1995 and 1996 in response to an unprecedented multiple submission, nominating nineteen synagogues.

== See also ==
- National Register of Historic Places listings in Hartford County, Connecticut
