= Congregation Gemiluth Chassodim =

Jewish synagogue in Alexandria, Louisiana, US

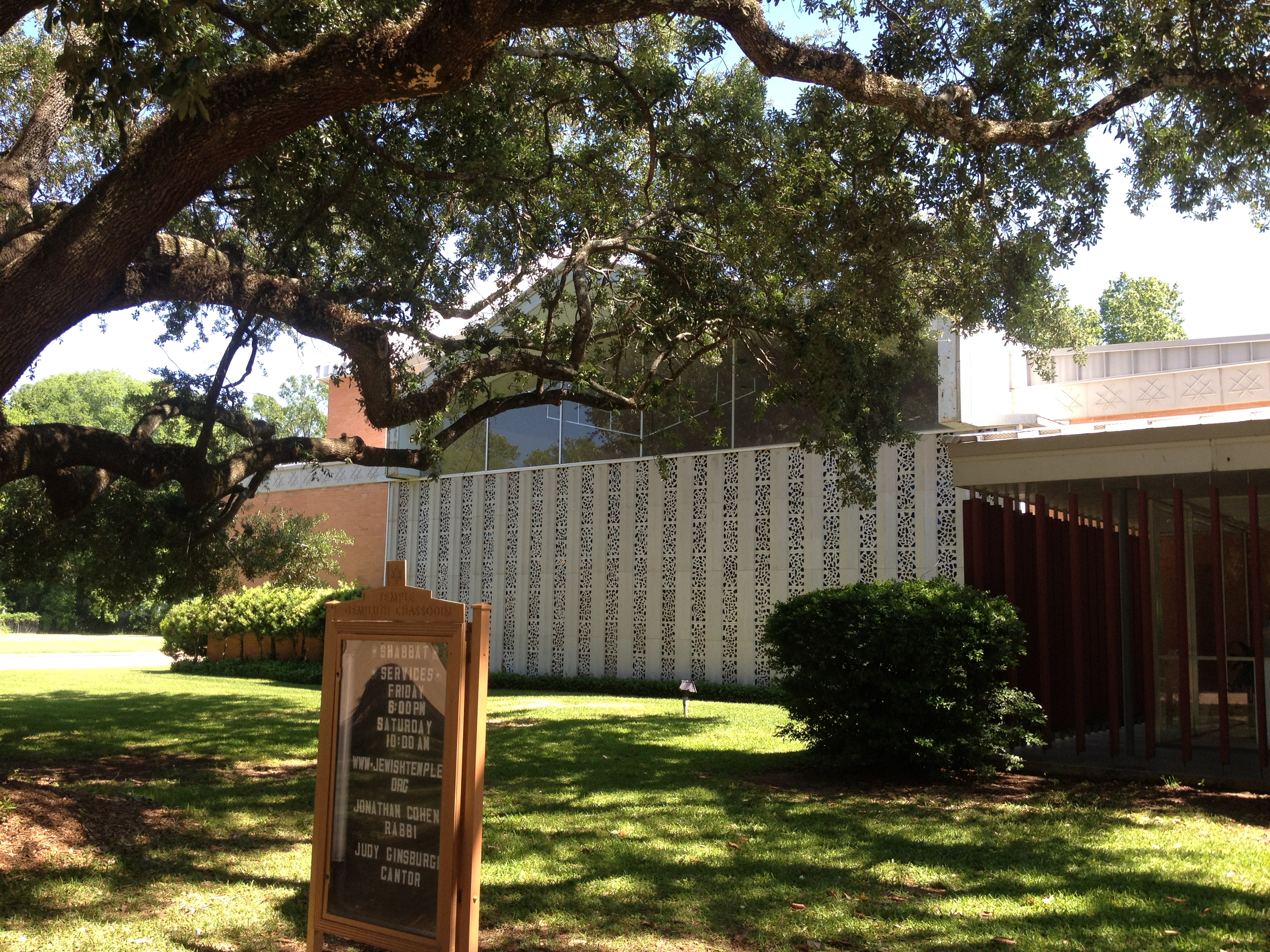
- Congregation Gemiluth Chassodim

- Location in Louisiana

Religion
- Affiliation: Reform Judaism
- Rite: Nusach Ashkenaz
- Ecclesiastical or organizational status: Synagogue
- Leadership: Rabbi Judy Ginsburg
- Status: Active

Location
- Location: 2021 Turner Street, Alexandria, Louisiana
- Country: United States
- Interactive map of Congregation Gemiluth Chassodim
- Coordinates: 31°17′53″N 92°27′17″W

Architecture
- Architect: Max Heinberg
- Type: Synagogue
- Style: Mid-Century modernist
- Established: 1859 (as a congregation)
- Completed: 1952

Specifications
- Capacity: 350 worshippers
- Materials: Brick

Website
- jewishtemple.org

Congregation Gemiluth Chassodim known locally as "The Jewish Temple" is an historic Jewish synagogue located in Alexandria, Louisiana, in the United States. Founded in 1859 by Jews from the Alsace region of France, it is one of the oldest congregations in Louisiana and one of the original founding members of the Union of American Hebrew Congregations, now known as the Union for Reform Judaism.

== History ==
Congregation Gemiluth Chassodim was originally established as the Hebrew Benevolent Society of Rapides Parish in 1852 in order to provide a Jewish Cemetery for burials. One belief for this is that certain families bought a burial ground when a small outbreak of yellow fever claimed six Jewish lives in the early 1850s. Eventually, the society evolved into a congregation in 1859. The first President of the Temple was Isaac Levy.

In 1860, the Jewish women of Alexandria assembled to found the Ladies' Hebrew Benevolent Society in order to raise money to buy real estate on which a temple could be built. The Ladies Hebrew Benevolent Society eventually changed its name to the Temple Sisterhood. In 1869, the Temple Sisterhood held a fundraising ball to raise money to build a synagogue at the corner of Third and Fiske Streets. Construction of the temple concluded in 1871. Two years later the congregation joined the Union of American Hebrew Congregations (now URJ) and hired Rabbi Marx Klein as its first rabbi.

Gemiluth Chassodim experienced great increase in its membership, from 123 families in 1925, to 154 families in 1930 and 203 families in 1945. The "Second Temple," which stood as an imposing Greek Revival structure (more than three stories tall) with a dome burned in 1956. The congregation had already constructed its current Mid-Century modern structure on Turner Street in the early 1950s. Designed by Max Heinberg, it stands as a unique example of Mid-Century modern architecture even to this day. In the early 1960s, the current sanctuary, offices, and classrooms were added. The sanctuary is capable of holding some 350 people at maximum capacity.

Thirty-four presidents and 25 rabbis have served the temple. In 2013, Rabbi Harley Karz-Wagman became the twenty-fifth rabbi of the Temple after leaving Mt. Sinai Synagogue in Cheyenne, Wyoming. In 2016, Rabbi Peter Schaktman served the congregation.

The congregation hired its first female clergy member since its founding in 1859, Rabbi Cantor Raina Siroty in 2017.

== Clergy ==
The following individuals have served as rabbi of the congregation:

Ordinal	Name	Term started	Term ended	Term of office	Notes
1	Marx Klein	1873	1879	5–6 years	
2	M. Weinstein	1881	1882	0–1 years	
3	Abraham Meyer	1882	1884	1–2 years	
4	H. Joseph M. Chumaceiro	1884	1885	0–1 years	
5	Israel Heinberg	1888	1889	0–1 years	
6	Hyman Saft	1889	1891	1–2 years	
7	Louis Schreiber	1892	1895	2–3 years	
8	Alex Rosenspitz	1895	1901	5–6 years	
9	Emile Ellinger	1901	1905	3–4 years	
10	Herman J. Elkin	1905	1907	1–2 years	
11	Leonard J. Rothstein	1907	1918	10–11 years	
12	Harry Weiss	1919	1920	0–1 years	
13	Myron M. Meyer	1921	1926	4–5 years	
14	H. Cerf Strauss	1927	1930	2–3 years	
15	Albert G. Baum	1930	1942	11–12 years	
16	Abraham Shinedling	1943	1944	0–1 years	
17	H. Bruce Ehrmann	1946	1947	0–1 years	
18	Mordecai M. Thurman	1947	1951	3–4 years	
19	Robert J. Schur	1952	1956	3–4 years	
20	Joel C. Dobin	1957	1957	0 years	
21	Martin I. Hinchin	1958	1988	29–30 years	
22	James L. Kessler	1988	1989	0–1 years	
23	Arnold S. Task	1989	2011	21–22 years	
24	Harley Karz-Wagman	2013	2016	2–3 years	
25	Peter Schaktman	2016	2017	0–1 years	
26	Raina Siroty	2017	incumbent	8–9 years	

== Notable members ==
- Sylvan Friedman, politician

== Gallery ==
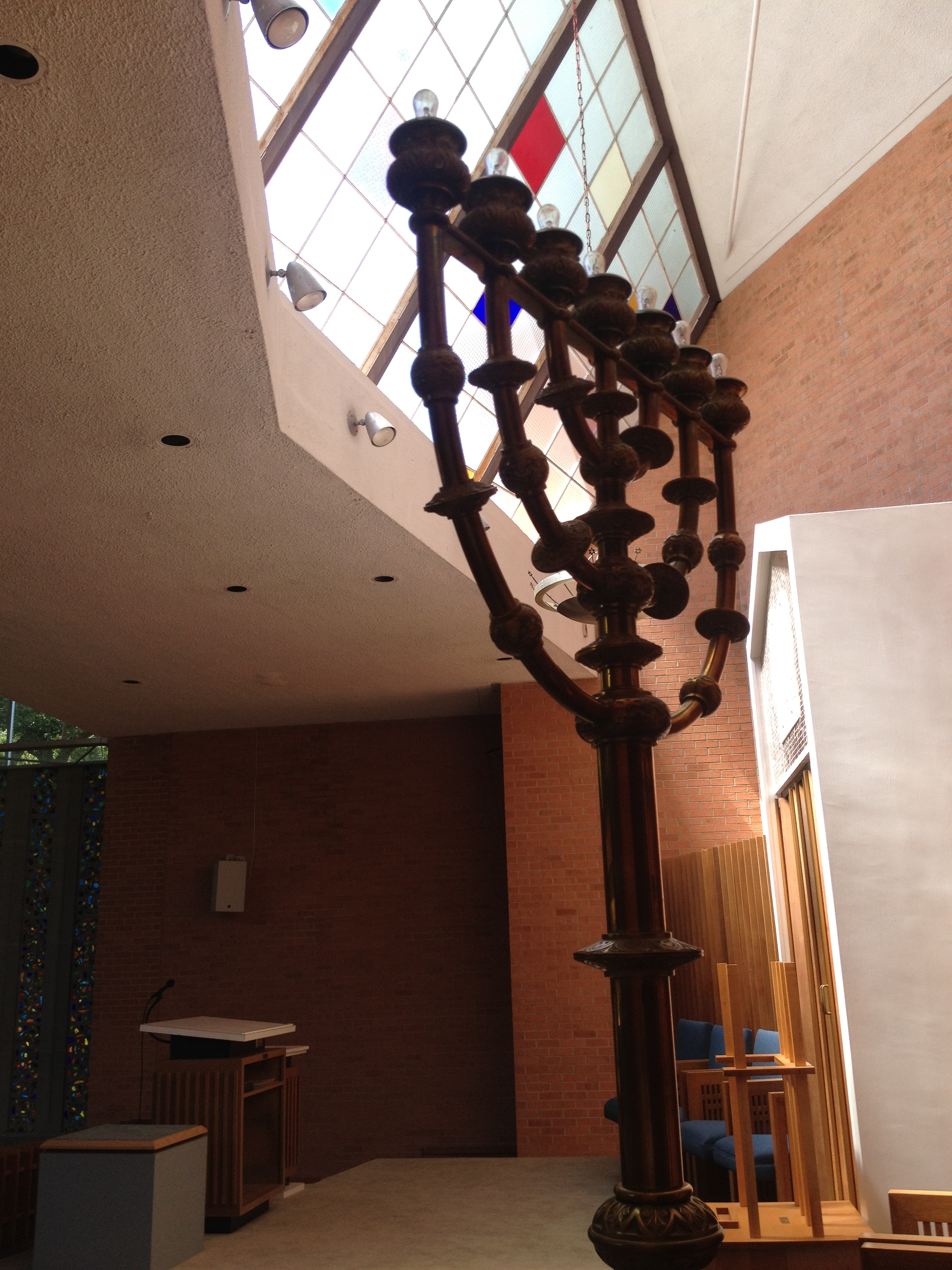
The Historic Menorah Upon The Bimah

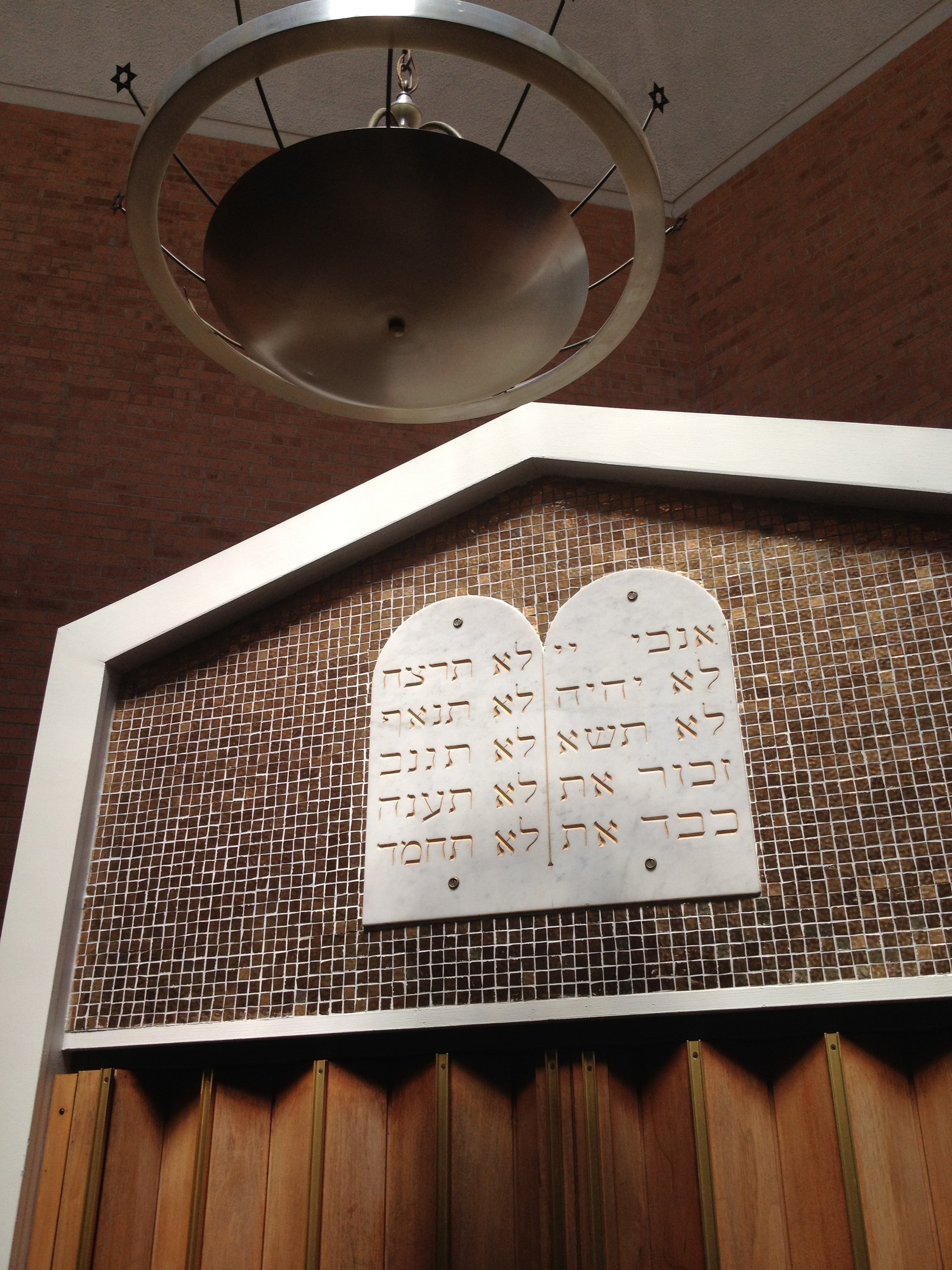
The Aseret HaDibrot And The Ner Tamid

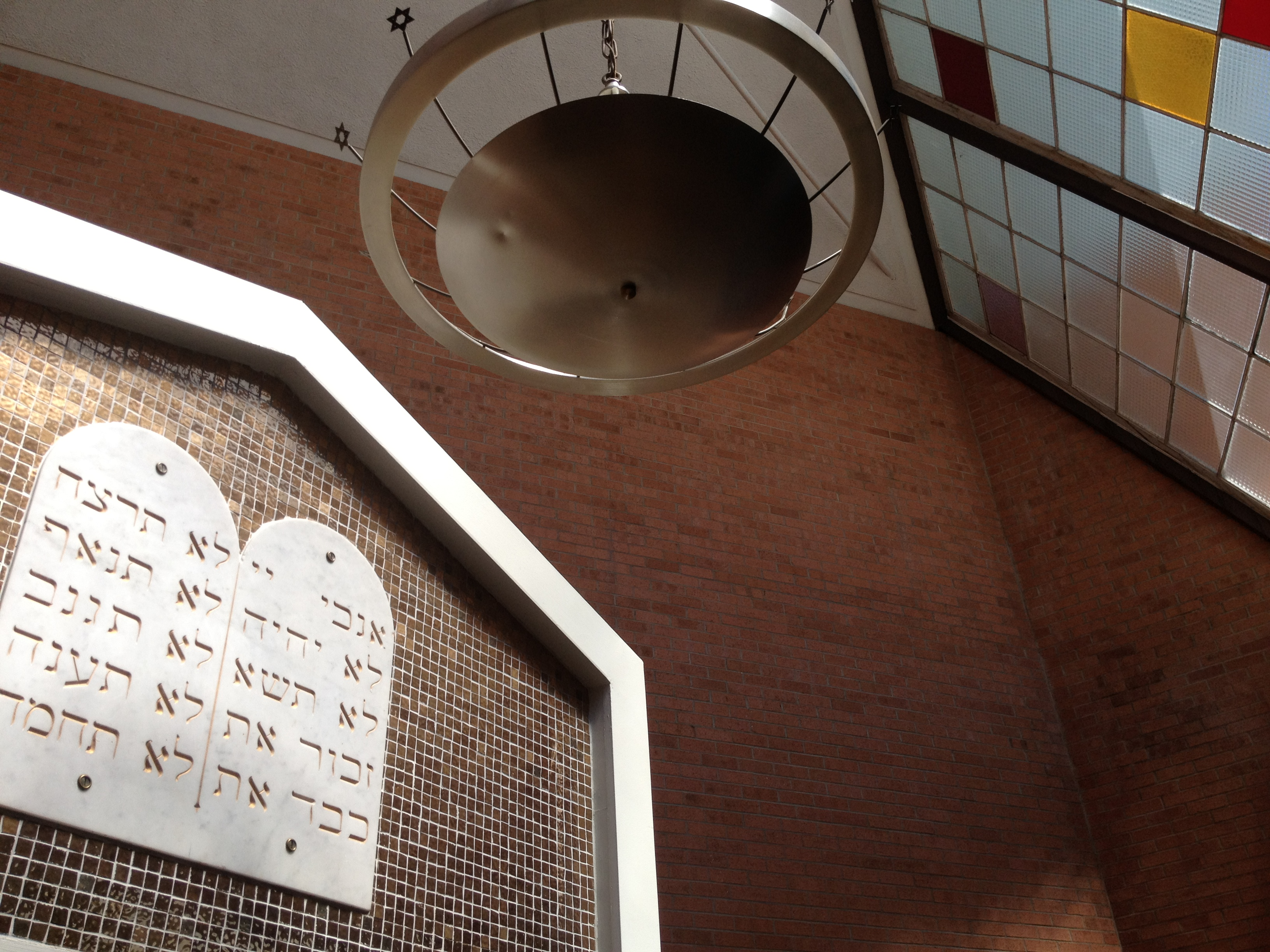
The Ner Tamid Looking Toward The Stained-Glass Ceiling

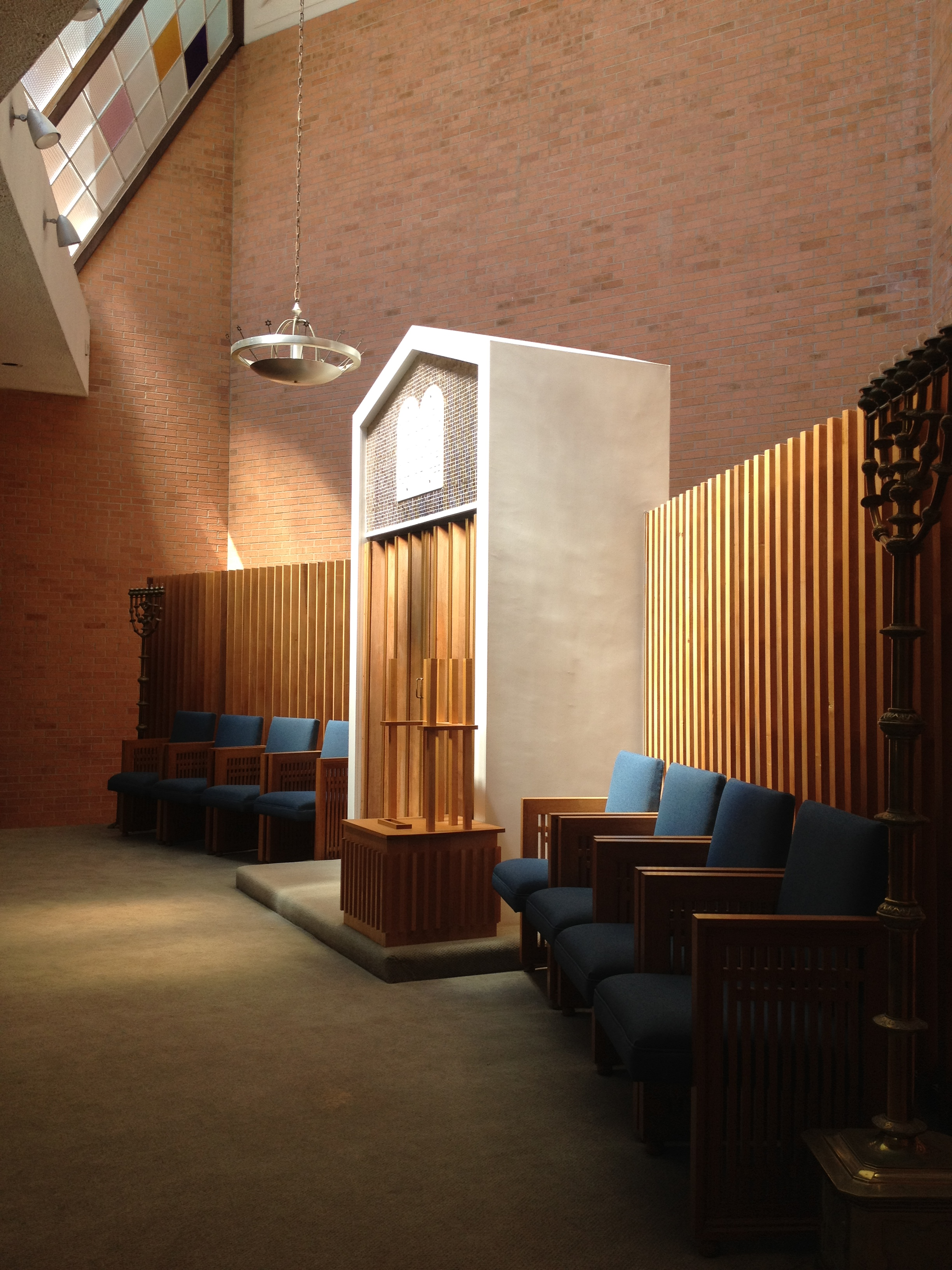
The Aron Kodesh

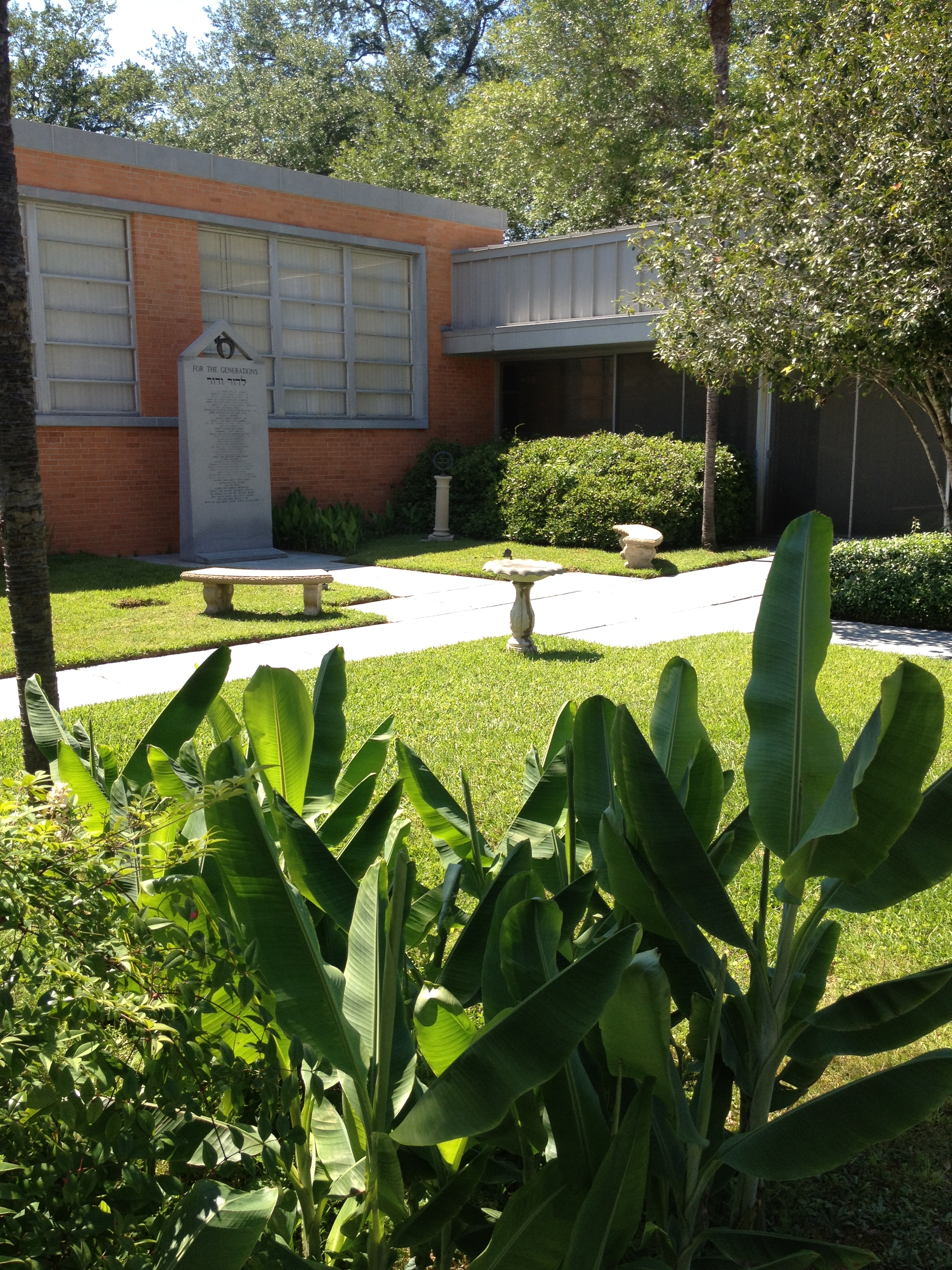
L'Dor V'Dor Monument And Garden

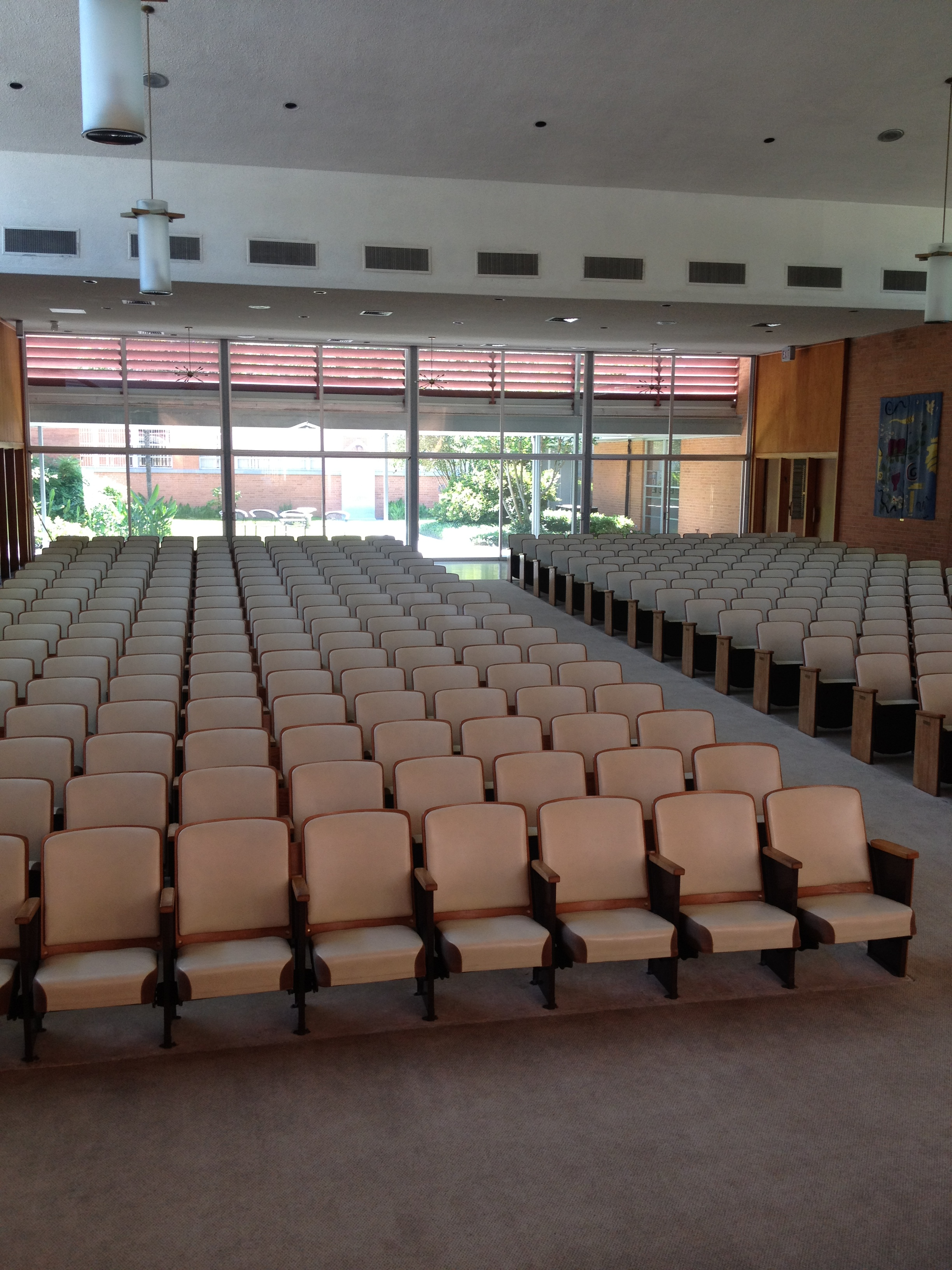
View Of The Sanctuary From The Bimah

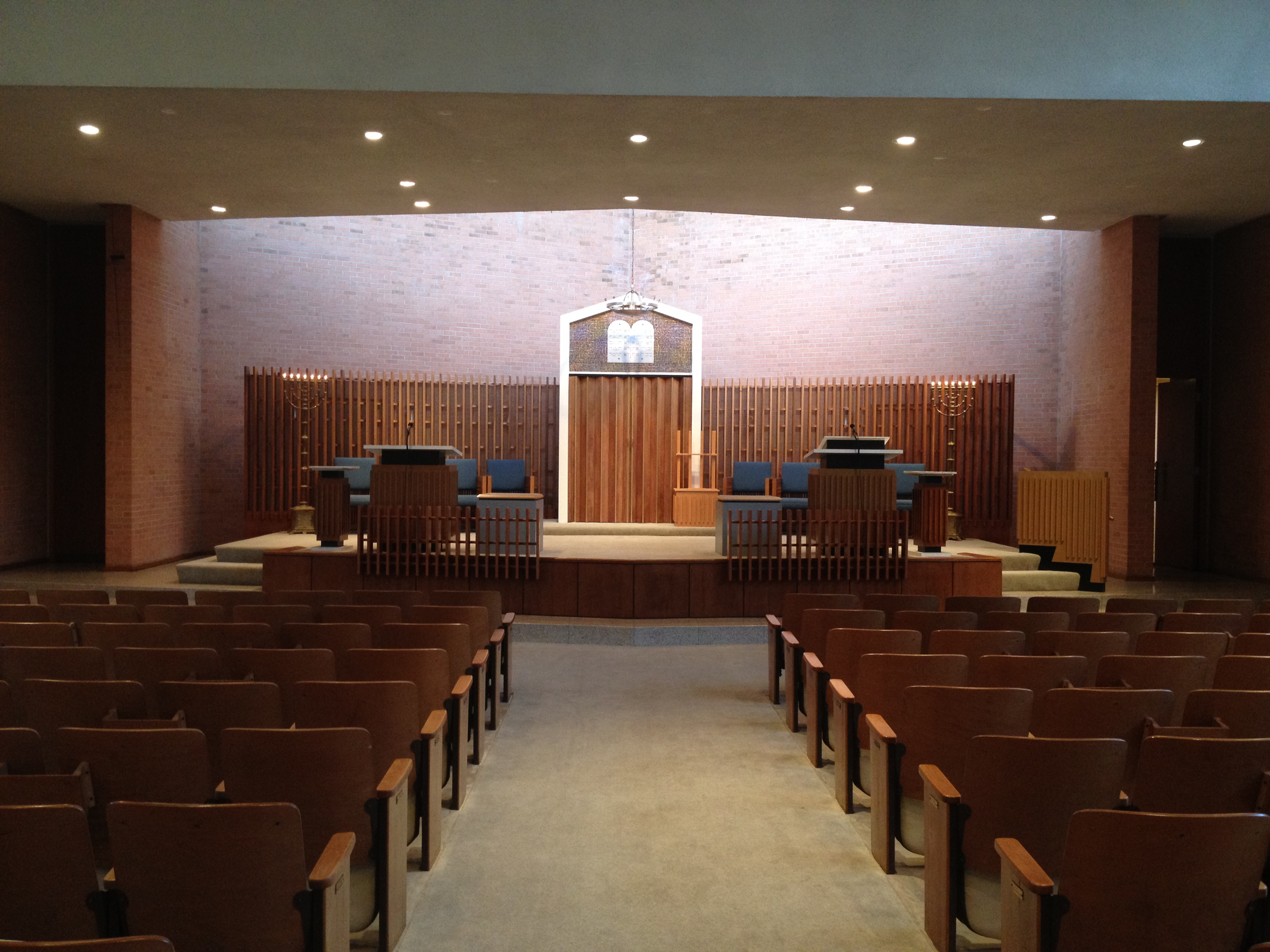
The Bimah

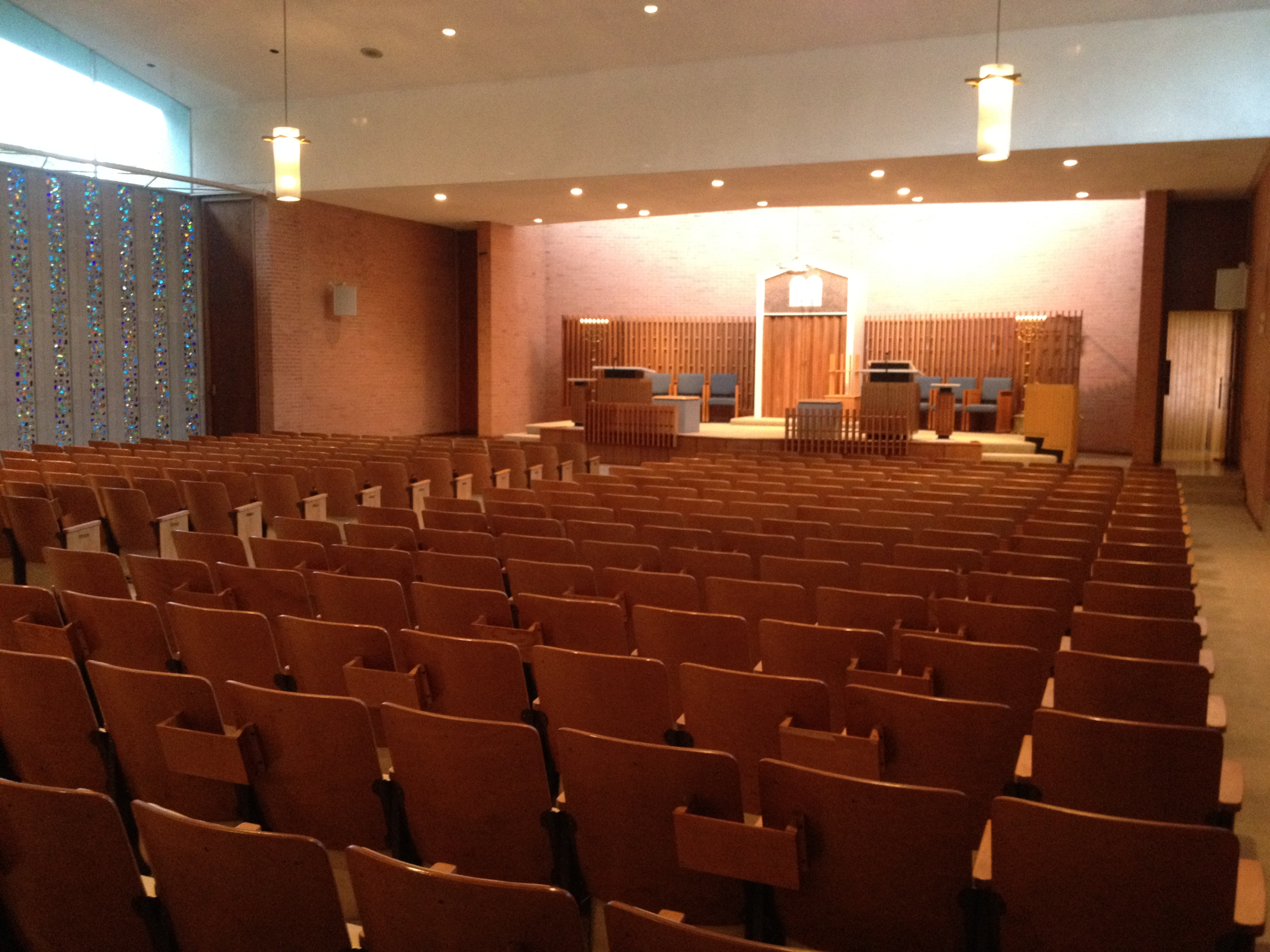
View Of The Sanctuary From Rear

== See also ==
- B'nai Israel Traditional Synagogue
