= Ravenna Kibbutz =

Community members enjoy dinner at the Ravenna Kibbutz

The Ravenna Kibbutz was a nondenominational Jewish intentional community from 2007–2012 located in the Ravenna neighborhood of Seattle. Its three rented houses and one apartment were home to 15 resident-organizers, who plan public programs such as Shabbat dinners and Jewish movie nights. The Kibbutz's ideology was not communistic; it was not a true commune but simply an example of cohousing. The Pacific Northwest contains many cohousing communities and a wide variety of Jewish organizations, but thus far the region has no other Jewish cohousing community.

Bonfires are a popular Kibbutz event

House Aleph, the original Kibbutz house, was supported in part by the Moishe House program, which offers financial and other resources to young Jews interested in hosting a certain number of public events per month. Houses Bet and Gimel were unaffiliated with Moishe House and played host to events like a monthly open-mic nights, film screenings, yoga classes, storytelling events, and meditation sessions.

Resident-organizers ranged from secular to Modern Orthodox in their religious views and vary also in their Jewish practices. Several kept kosher, while others did not, and only some were shomer Shabbat. Nonetheless, all Kibbutz households maintained kosher (dairy) dishes, silverware, and other kitchen implements in addition to treyf plates and utensils that may be used to prepare non-kosher food.

== History ==
During the warmer months, Kibbutz meals are held outside.

The Kibbutz was founded in the fall of 2007 by Joel Rothschild, Masha Shtern, and Tamar Libicki; Azura Newman and Lincoln Rose were also original members. The community's first official event was a potluck dinner in October of that year. In founding the Kibbutz, Rothschild hoped to recreate aspects of his positive experience as a member of Kosher Co-op, part of the Oberlin Student Cooperative Association (OSCA) at Oberlin College. Current resident-organizer Neal Schindler also attended Oberlin and was in OSCA.

The Kibbutz acquired its second house, nicknamed Bet, in January 2009; a third house, Gimel, was added in June 2009, expanding the number of resident-organizers to 16. These include Sergey Feldman, Shaul Goldberg, Dane Kuttler, Carrie Turner, Asya Vaisman, Sebastian Schulman, Zara Friedman, Rachel Stampfer, Jim Thorson, Steven Blum, Deborah Siegel, and Ilana Mantell, an employee of Kavana Cooperative. In September 2009, the Kibbutz annexed the basement of Bet to add two residents (Turner and Vaisman); two more resident-organizers (Stampfer and her partner) moved into an apartment across the street.

The Kibbutz closed in 2012 after the buildings' landlord decided to sell the property.

== See also ==
- Urban kibbutz
- Cooperatives
