= Rouyn-Noranda Synagogue =

Synagogue in Quebec, Canada

- Beit Knesset Israel; Kneseth Israel Congregation
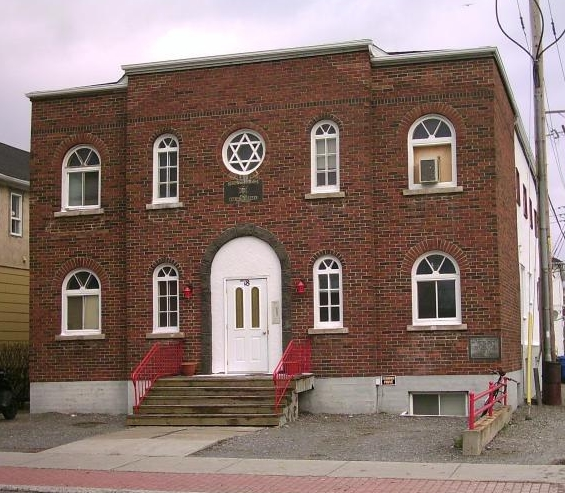
- The former Rouyn-Noranda Synagogue

Religion
- Affiliation: Judaism
- Ownership: Rouyn-Noranda Hebrew Congregation
- Status: Closed (1972); Sold (1973)

Location
- Location: Rouyn-Noranda
- State: Quebec
- Country: Canada
- Interactive map of Rouyn-Noranda Synagogue
- Coordinates: 48.2452°N 79.0191°W

Architecture
- Type: Synagogue
- Established: 1948
- Materials: Brick

The Rouyn-Noranda Synagogue was a Jewish synagogue located in the city of Rouyn-Noranda, Quebec, Canada. It was built in 1948 as the Beit Knesset Israel (in Hebrew) or Kneseth Israel Congregation (in English) by the Rouyn-Noranda Hebrew Congregation. A first wooden synagogue was built in 1932 before the same place.

By the 1960s, the Jewish community began to shrink as many of the younger generation began moving away to college. The synagogue closed as a place of Jewish worship in 1972 and was sold in 1973. The proceeds of the sale were donated to Israel.

== History of the Jews in Rouyn-Noranda ==
The first Jew to live in Rouyn-Noranda was Louis Scott, who stood on the edge of Osisko Lake. However, Mr. and Mrs. D. Caplan are actually the first to be cited at the opening of the second synagogue in 1949.

== See also ==
- History of the Jews in Canada
