= Yeshiva Ohr Yisrael =

Yeshiva Ohr Yisrael of Atlanta

Location
- 1458 Holly Lane NE; Atlanta, Georgia 30329-3553; United States
- Coordinates: 33.82371°N 84.32561°W

Information
- Type: Private high school
- Religious affiliation: Orthodox Judaism
- Established: 2002
- NCES School ID: A0501472
- Principal: Rabbi Avrohom Tkatch
- Teaching staff: 12.6 (on an FTE basis)
- Grades: 9–12
- Gender: Boys
- Enrollment: 56 (2017-2018)
- Student to teacher ratio: 4.4
- Language: English and Hebrew
- Campus type: Suburban
- Website: www.ohryisrael.org

Yeshiva Ohr Yisrael of Atlanta is a private, Orthodox Jewish high school for boys in Atlanta, Georgia, United States.
