= Temple Sinai (Portsmouth, Virginia) =

Reform Jewish synagogue

- Location of the former synagogue in Virginia

Religion
- Affiliation: Reform Judaism (former)
- Ecclesiastical or organisational status: Synagogue (1953 – 2012)
- Status: Merged in 2012 with another congregation

Location
- Location: 4401 Hatton Point Road, Portsmouth, Virginia
- Country: United States
- Coordinates: 36°51′09″N 76°21′41″W

Architecture
- Established: 1953 (as a congregation)
- Groundbreaking: 1956 (cornerstone)
- Completed: 1957

Temple Sinai was an egalitarian, Reform Jewish synagogue that was located at 4401 Hatton Point Road, Portsmouth, Virginia, in the United States. The congregation, established in December 1953, was called A Family of Traditional and Non-Traditional Families and was a member of the Union for Reform Judaism.

The congregation was headed by Rabbi Arthur Z. Steinberg. Temple Sinai celebrated its 50th anniversary in 2004 and merged with Norfolk's Ohef Sholom Temple in June 2012.

== History ==
Temple Sinai was founded on December 2, 1953, during the Jewish festival of Hanukkah. Its seven sponsoring members agreed on the congregation's name within a few days and held their first religious service at the Portsmouth Women's Club on January 8, 1954. Until the construction of its building, services were also held at the Portsmouth Coca-Cola Bottling Works and the Suburban Country Club. The cornerstone for the building on its 2 acres (0.81 ha) site on Hatton Point Road was laid in 1956. Temple Sinai's fiftieth anniversary was in June 2004.

== Portsmouth United Religious School ==
Temple Sinai and Gomley Chesed, a nearby synagogue also located in Portsmouth, formed a combined religious school program, Portsmouth United Religious School, also known as "Portsmouth Religious School", abbreviated as "PURS". The school runs a family education program and outreach for the Jewish community.

== Activities ==
Temple Sinai emphasized religious education and service to the community through social action.

Temple Sinai helped provide food for the hungry and shelter for the homeless. As the only Jewish congregation among fifty congregations of the Portsmouth Volunteers for the Homeless, Temple Sinai distinguished itself by opening its doors for fifty to sixty homeless people during Christmas week, so that their Christian partners can be at home with their families during this season. In this work it was also affiliated with MAZON's "3% Circle", in which 3% of the cost of the temple's holiday dinners and lifecycle celebrations were donated to MAZON.

Temple Sinai engaged in pulpit exchanges with Gomley Chesed and with Ohef Sholom Temple of Norfolk. A pulpit exchange involves a visit of one congregation to the other congregation's facility for a special combined service.

== Bibliography ==
- "Reform temple is high on social action". The Virginian-Pilot. Norfolk, VA. September 24, 2008. Archived from the original on November 6, 2012 – via HighBeam Research. "Temple Sinai in the Hatton Point neighborhood of Churchland...about 100 families are members with average attendance on Friday evenings of about 40." Paywall.
