= Michael-Ann Russel Jewish Community Center =

The Michael-Ann Russell Jewish Community Center or MARJCC is a Jewish Community Center in the United States. It is located in North Miami Beach, Florida, a suburb of Miami.

== Programs and amenities ==
The MARJCC is a membership organization that offers educational, cultural, and physical fitness classes and programs for all ages.

Since the 1970s, the center has operated Camp Sol Taplin, one of the largest Jewish summer day camps in the area.
