= Tiferet Israel Congregation (Toronto) =

Sephardic Orthodox synagogue in Toronto, Canada

- Hebrew: תפארת ישראל
- Location in Toronto

Religion
- Affiliation: Orthodox Judaism
- Sect: Moroccan Jewish
- Rite: Sephardic
- Ecclesiastical or organizational status: Synagogue
- Status: Active

Location
- Location: 756 Sheppard Avenue West, North York, Toronto, Ontario M3H 2S8
- Country: Canada
- Interactive map of Tiferet Israel Congregation
- Coordinates: 43°45′15″N 79°26′49″W

Architecture
- Type: Synagogue
- Completed: 1988

Website
- www.tiferetisrael.ca

Tiferet Israel Congregation (Hebrew: תפארת ישראל) is a Sephardic Orthodox synagogue in Toronto, Ontario, Canada on Sheppard Avenue West in the former city of North York.

Tiferet Israel Congregation follows Moroccan Jewish tradition. Regular services are held during the week, on Shabbat, and on Jewish holidays. The synagogue contains a sanctuary on the main floor with separate seating for men and for women, and in the basement there is a kitchen and a room for luncheons, festive meals, and parties.

== History ==
The congregation was established in 1965 in the Bathurst and Wilson area by recent newcomers to Toronto from Morocco. The lot at 756 Sheppard Avenue West was purchased on November 24, 1978. A groundbreaking ceremony was held in May 1988, and on September 5, 1988 an inauguration ceremony marked the completion of construction.
