= Temple Sinai (Denver) =

Reform synagogue in Denver, Colorado, US

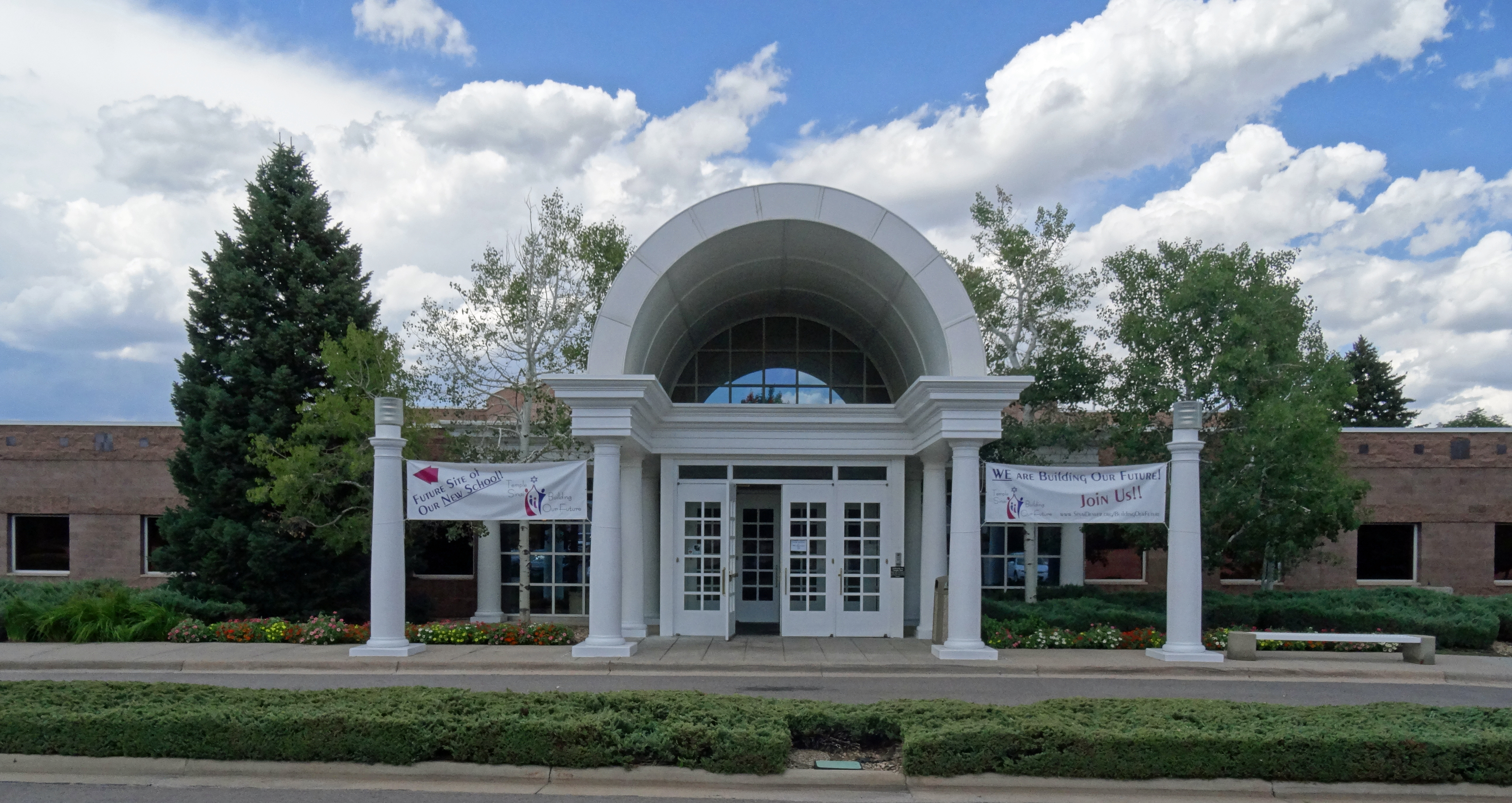
- The synagogue, in 2013

- Location in Colorado

Religion
- Affiliation: Reform Judaism
- Ecclesiastical or organizational status: Synagogue
- Leadership: Rabbi Richard S. Rheins; Rabbi Michael Shields (Associate); Rabbi Raymond Zwerin (Emeritus)
- Status: Active

Location
- Location: 3509 South Glencoe, Denver, Colorado
- Country: United States
- Interactive map of Temple Sinai
- Coordinates: 39°39′8.86″N 104°55′36.09″W

Architecture
- Architect: Curtis Fentress
- Type: Synagogue architecture
- Established: 1967 (as a congregation)
- Completed: 1984

Website
- sinaidenver.org

Temple Sinai is a Reform Jewish congregation and synagogue located at 3509 South Glencoe in Denver, Colorado, in the United States.

== History ==
It was started in 1967 by Rabbi Raymond A. Zwerin, who had been ordained three years prior at the Hebrew Union College.

== Overview ==
It is a full-functioning synagogue with a religious school catering to preschoolers through confirmation students. Services are held every Friday night, Saturday morning, and on holidays. The synagogue has a pre-school.

The synagogue has a large multicolored mural of children at play. The current building was built in 1984. A meditation garden was constructed in 2003.

The workbook Tzedakah, Gemilut Chasadim, and Ahavah: A Manual for World Repair (1990), by Joel Lurie Grishaver and Beth Huppin, was piloted at the synagogue.

In September 1995, more than 650 members of the synagogue spent a day removing graffiti in Denver, painting buildings, cooking pastries, repairing toys, scraping walls, and potting plants, in an effort to fulfill a mitzvah.

In 2011, Temple Sinai received a $21,000 grant from the Rose Community Foundation for the integration of special-needs children into its religious school.

The temple's maintenance manual was featured in The Temple Management Manual (2003), by the National Association of Temple Administrators (U.S.), Union of American Hebrew Congregations.

== See also ==
- History of the Jews in Denver
