= Temple Sinai (Sumter, South Carolina) =

Historic Reform synagogue in South Carolina, United States

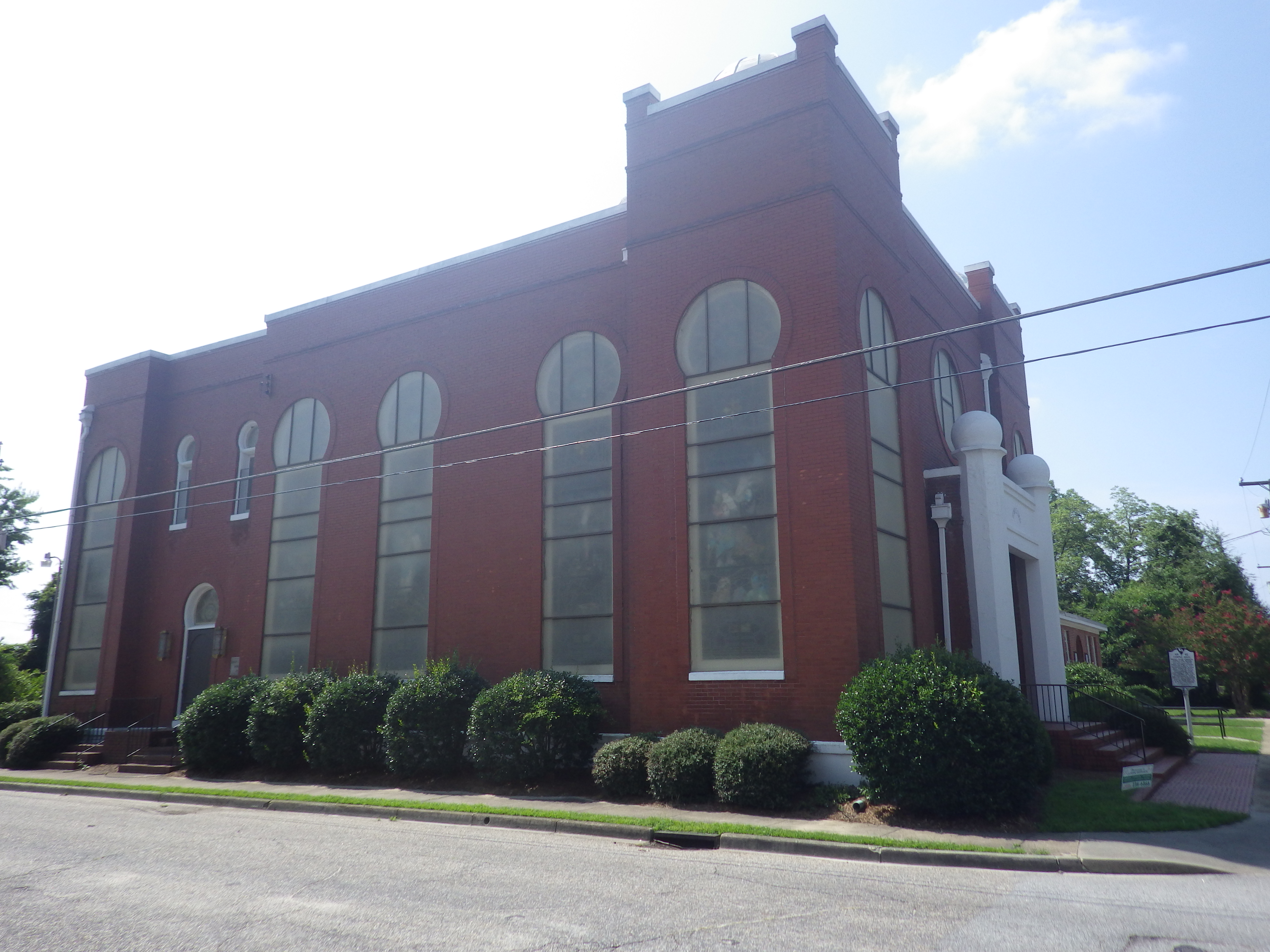
- Temple Sinai in 2014

- Location in South Carolina

Religion
- Affiliation: Reform Judaism
- Ecclesiastical or organizational status: Synagogue
- Leadership: Lay led
- Status: Active

Location
- Location: 11-13 Church Street, Sumter, South Carolina 29150
- Country: United States
- Interactive map of Temple Sinai
- Coordinates: 33°55′17.7″N 80°20′48.4″W

Architecture
- Type: Synagogue
- Style: Moorish Revival
- Established: 1895 (as a congregation)
- Completed: 1912
- Materials: Brick

Website
- templesinaisumter.org
- Temple Sinai
- U.S. National Register of Historic Places
- Area: less than one acre
- NRHP reference No.: 98001645
- Added to NRHP: January 21, 1999

Temple Sinai also known as Congregation Sinai, whose official name is the Sumter Society of Israelites, is an historic Reform Jewish congregation and synagogue, located at 11-13 Church Street, on the corner of West Hampton Avenue, in Sumter, South Carolina, in the United States.

The brick temple was built in 1912 in the Moorish Revival style and was added to the National Register of Historic Places on January 21, 1999. It also houses the Temple Sinai Jewish History Center that opened in June 2018.

== History ==
The first Jewish settlers in Sumter were Sephardi who came from Charleston in 1815. Congregation Sinai was formed in April 1895, by the merger of the Hebrew Cemetery Society and the Sumter Hebrew Benevolent Society. Visiting rabbis from Charleston and Augusta, Georgia, served the congregation until 1904 when Rabbi Jacob Klein settled in Sumter and began serving Temple Sinai. The sanctuary of the present temple was built in 1912 facing Church Street to replace an earlier wooden synagogue at the same location.

The Barnett Memorial Addition, a two-story brick Moorish Revival auditorium/banquest hall and classroom/office building facing West Hampton Avenue, was built in 1932, behind the sanctuary, which it complements. In 1956, the one story brick Hyman Brody Building was attached to the rear of the Barnett Memorial Addition to provide a kitchen and more classrooms, offices and restrooms. Although simpler than the other two buildings, it still has some Moorish features.

Temple Sinai's archives have been donated to the Jewish Heritage Collection at the College of Charleston.

== Stained glass windows ==
Temple Sinai is noted for the eleven drapery glass stained glass windows on its side and entrance walls, which depict scenes from the Tanakh. With the exception of one round window high over the entrance portico, the windows are uniformly 5 by 20 feet (1.5 by 6.1 m) and in their shape mimic the castellated domed Moorish towers that flank the entrance.

== Current status ==
Temple Sinai entered into an agreement with Coastal Community Foundation, Kahal Kadosh Beth Elohim Synagogue, and the Charleston Jewish Federation to maintain its cemetery and Temple and to address concerns regarding its long-term viability. Additionally, in 2015, Temple Sinai entered a partnership with the Sumter County Museum to create a permanent exhibit on Jewish history in South Carolina and in Sumter. The museum also includes a section devoted to the Holocaust and Sumter's ties to the Holocaust, and opened to the public on June 2, 2018.

== See also ==
- List of Registered Historic Places in South Carolina
