= Congregation Tifereth Israel (Greenport, New York) =

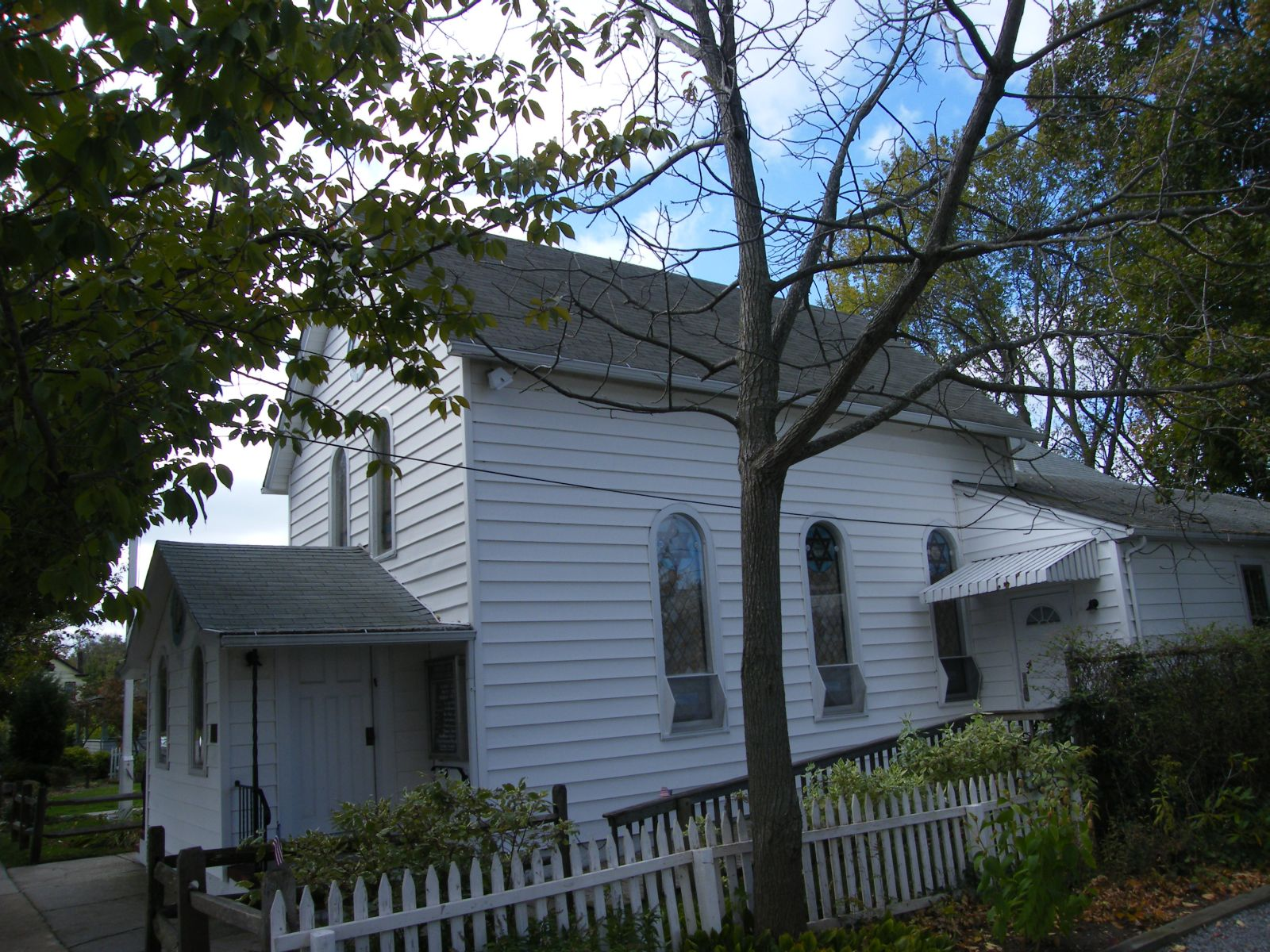
- The synagogue building, in 2008

- Location on Long Island, New York

Religion
- Affiliation: Judaism
- Rite: Conservative Judaism
- Ecclesiastical or organizational status: Synagogue
- Leadership: Rabbi Gadi Capela
- Status: Active

Location
- Location: 519 Fourth Street, Greenport, Long Island, New York 11944
- Country: United States
- Interactive map of Congregation Tifereth Israel
- Coordinates: 41°6′2″N 72°21′55″W

Architecture
- Architect: Stirling Corwin
- Type: Synagogue
- Style: Victorian Vernacular
- Established: 1902 (as a congregation)
- Completed: 1904

Specifications
- Length: 30 feet (9.1 m)
- Width: 20 feet (6.1 m)

Website
- tiferethisraelgreenport.org
- Congregation Tifereth Israel Synagogue
- U.S. National Register of Historic Places
- Area: less than one acre
- NRHP reference No.: 06000161
- Added to NRHP: March 22, 2006

Congregation Tifereth Israel, officially Tifereth Israel Anshaei Greenport, is an egalitarian, inclusive, Conservative Jewish congregation and historic synagogue, located at 519 Fourth Street in Greenport, Suffolk County, on Long Island, in New York, in the United States. The synagogue evolved from Orthodox, in its early years, to Conservative, and most recently to egalitarian Conservative, meaning full participation among women.

== Synagogue building ==
It is an irregular-shaped 20-by-30-foot (6.1 by 9.1 m) building that consists of the original 1903 Victorian Vernacular portion and a large addition to the rear (c. 1920 and 2000). It is a 1 1/2-story structure with a front-gabled roof and a 1-story projecting entrance with a low-pitched, front-gabled roof.

The building includes an upper level balcony which was the women's section in the early to mid 20th century, when the observance level of the congregation was orthodox. The balcony and lower level adopted mixed seating when the synagogue joined the Conservative movement.

The cornerstone of the building was laid December 28, 1903; and the dedication ceremony was held on January 11, 1904.

The synagogue building was added to the National Register of Historic Places in 2006.
