= Cuajimalpa =

Cuajimalpa de Morelos
- Borough
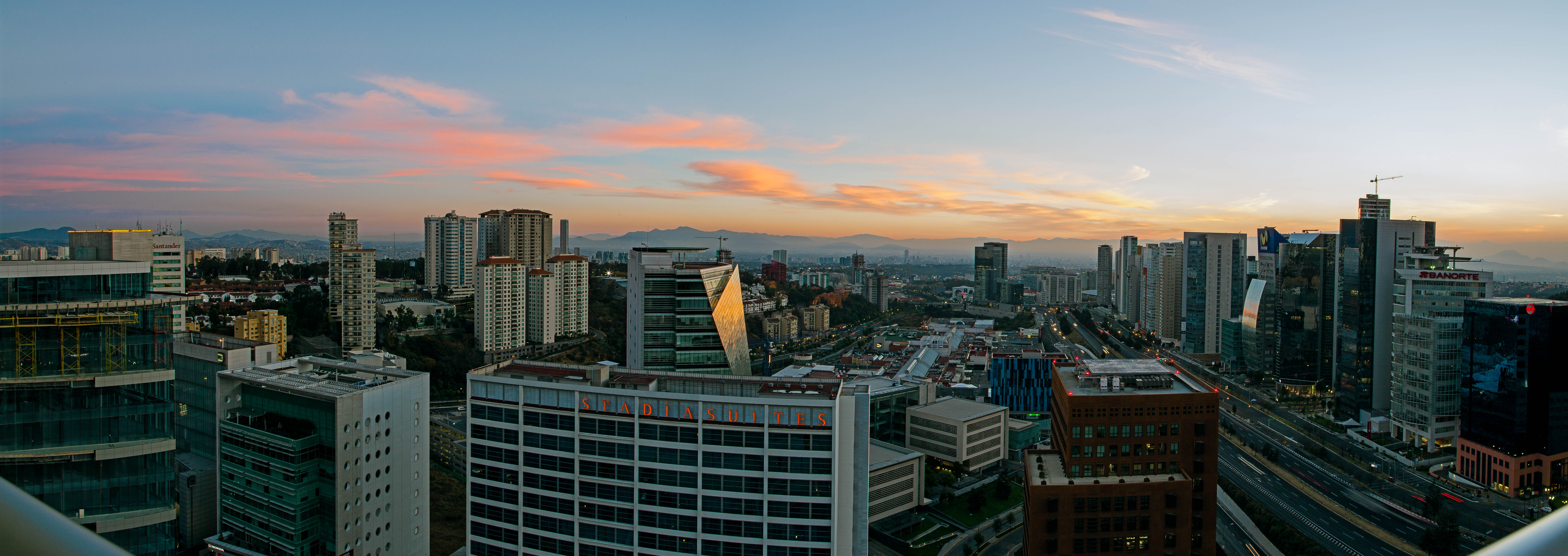
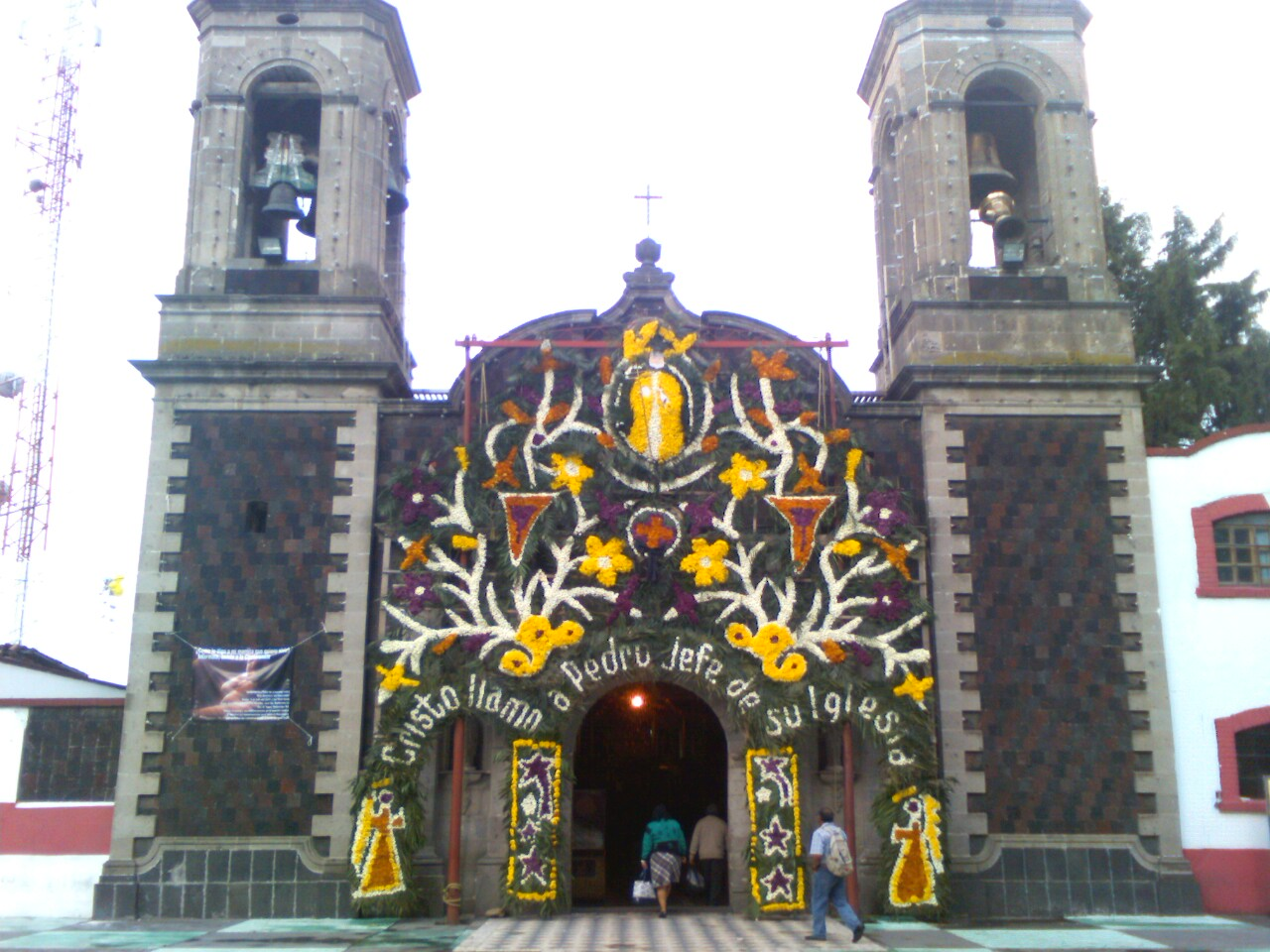
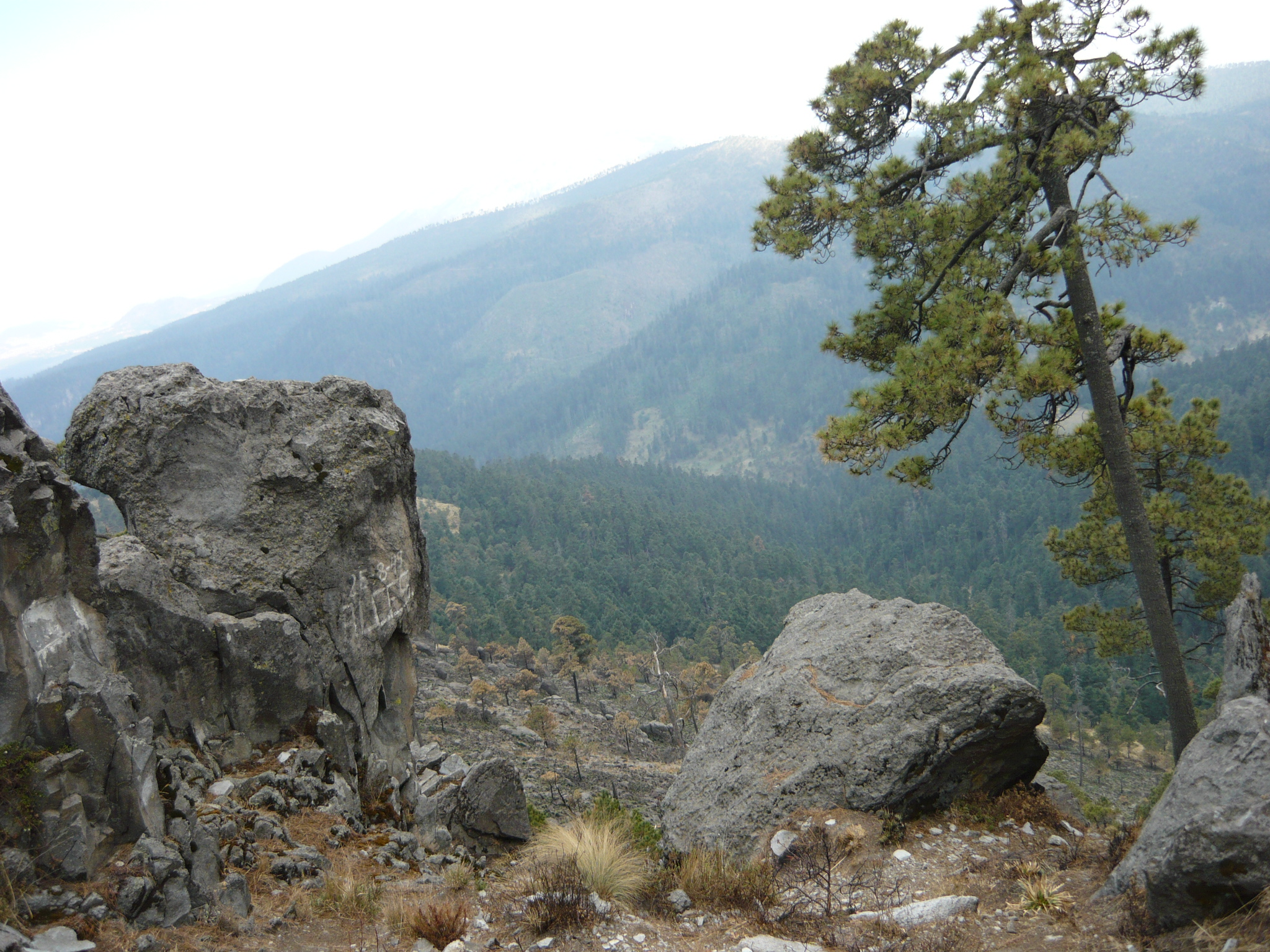
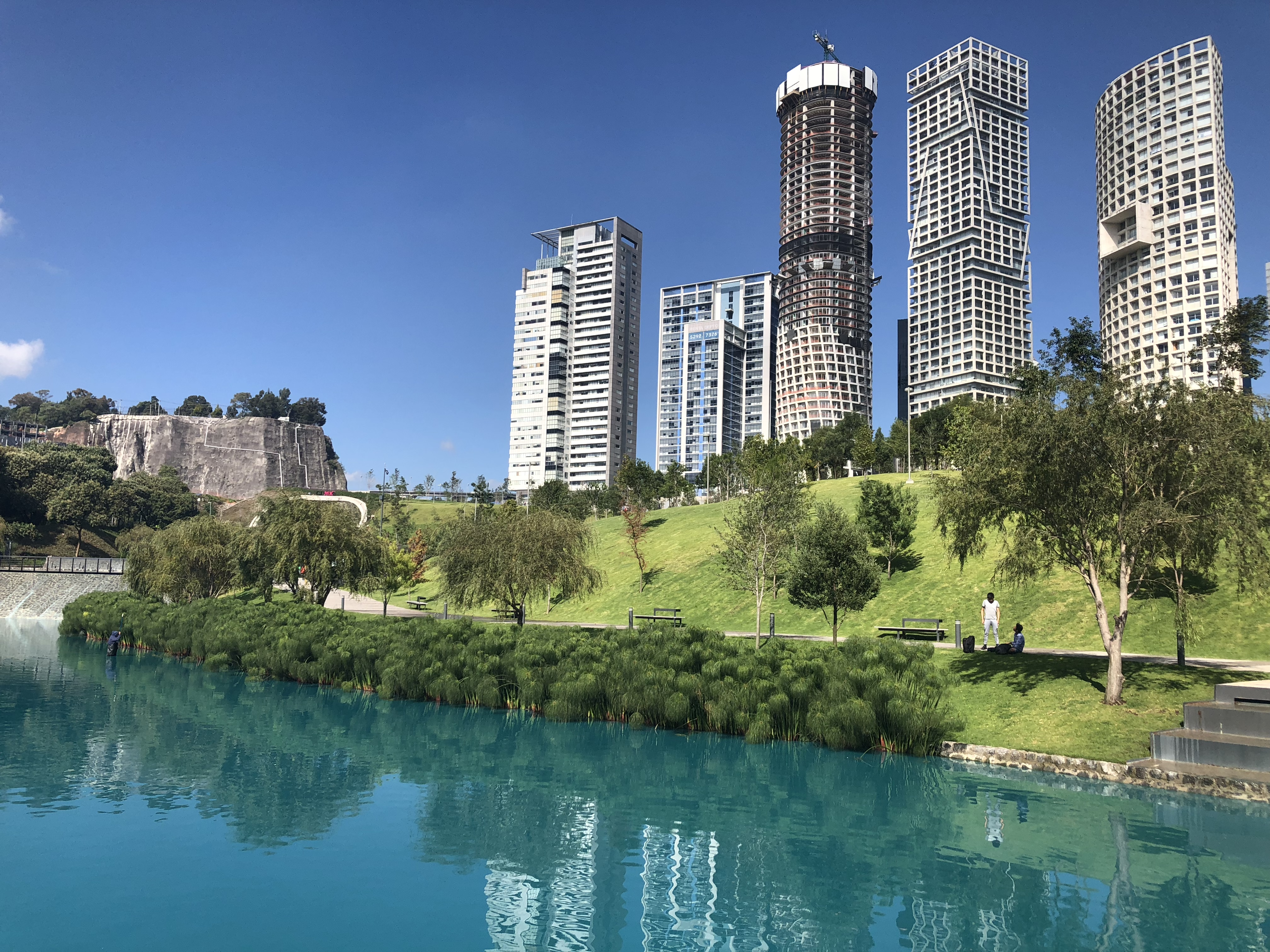
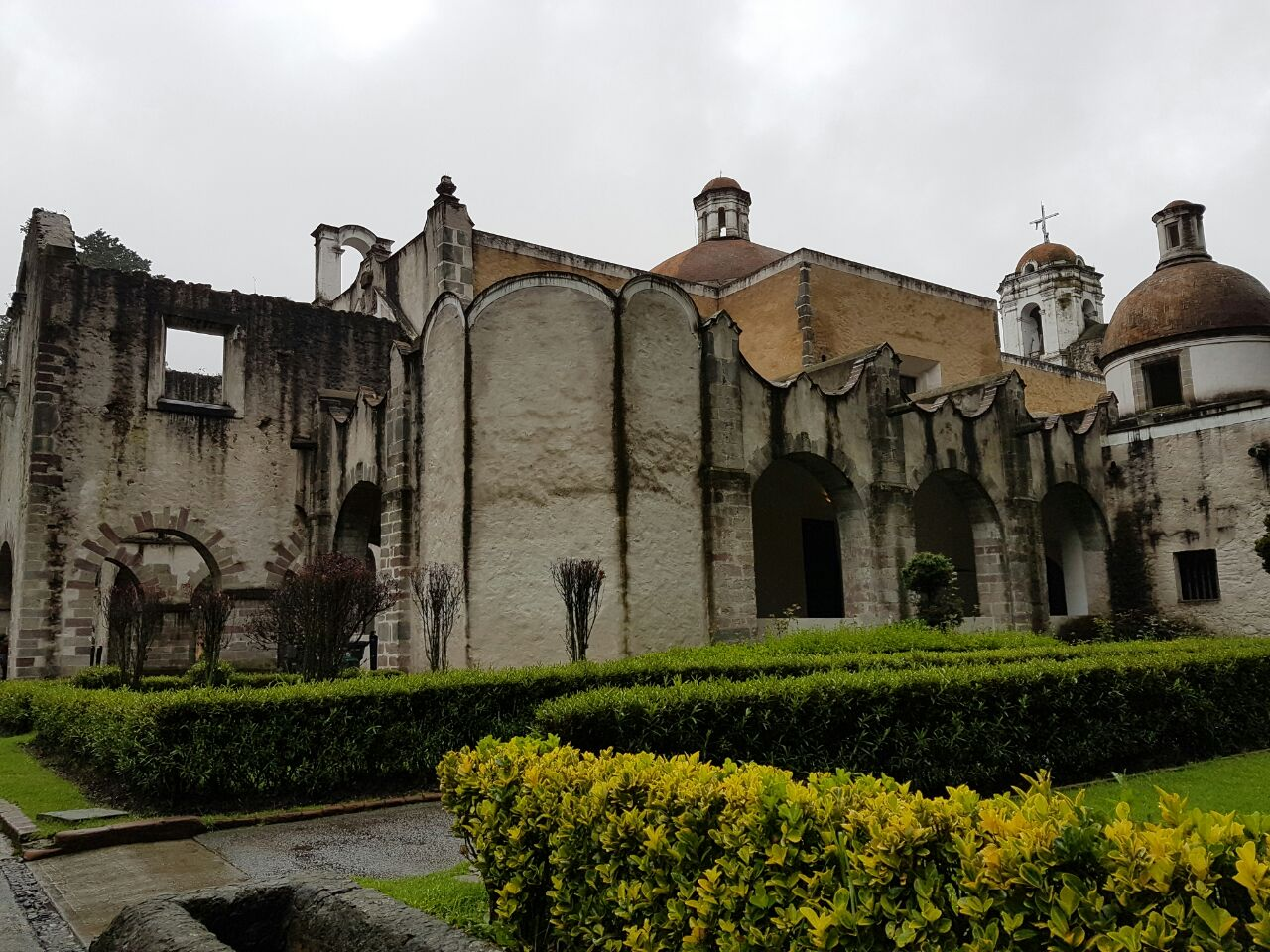
- Top: Panoramic view of Santa Fe; Middle: San Pedro Parish, La Marquesa Park; Bottom: La Mexicana Park, Desierto de los Leones National Park

- Seal

- Cuajimalpa de Morelos within Mexico City
- Coordinates: 19°22′28″N 99°17′05″W
- Country: Mexico
- Federal entity: Mexico City
- Established: 1928
- Named for: Pre-Columbian city
- Seat: San Pedro Cuajimalpa

Government
  - Mayor: Carlos Orvañanos Rea (PAN)
  - Federal electoral district: CDMX-17

Area
  - Borough: 71.84 km^{2} (27.74 sq mi)
  - Urban: 16.22 km^{2} (6.26 sq mi)
- Elevation: 2,623 m (8,606 ft)
- Highest elevation: 3,800 m (12,500 ft)
- Lowest elevation: 2,420 m (7,940 ft)

Population (2020).
  - Borough: 217,686
  - Density: 3,030/km^{2} (7,848/sq mi)
- Time zone: UTC-6 (Zona Centro)
- Postal codes: 05000 – 05780
- Area code: 55
- HDI (2020): ▼0.808 Very High
- Website: cuajimalpa.cdmx.gob.mx

Cuajimalpa de Morelos (Spanish: [kwaxiˈmalpa]; more commonly known simply as Cuajimalpa) is a borough (demarcación territorial) in Mexico City. It is located on the west side of the city in the Sierra de las Cruces mountains which separate Mexico City from the State of Mexico. The borough is named after the former rural town of Cuajimalpa, which has since been absorbed by urban sprawl. The borough is home to the Desierto de los Leones National Park, the first declared in Mexico as well as the second largest annual passion play in Mexico City.

== History ==
The proper name of the borough is Cuajimalpa de Morelos. The borough was named after the prominent community and former municipality of San Pedro Cuajimalpa which remains the seat of local government. "Cuajimalpa" is derived from the Nahuatl "Cuauhximalpan" which meant place of sawmills. The appendage of "de Morelos" was added in 1970 to honor José María Morelos, a hero of the Mexican War of Independence.

In 1342 the Tepanecas established themselves in the area, controlling the forests for about 100 years from their capital in Azcapotzalco. When the Tepanecas were overthrown by the Aztec Triple Alliance in the mid 15th century, many fled to this rugged terrain. During the Spanish conquest, Hernán Cortés subdued settlements in the area such as Santa Rosa, Santa Lucía, Cuauhximalpan, Chimalpa and Acopilco to secure the roads leading to the Toluca Valley. In 1534, Cortés took personal control of lands in the area, calling it San Pedro Cuauhximalpa and established towns such as San Lorenzo Acopilco, San Mateo Tlaltenango and San Pablo Chimalpa.

In the 17th century the Carmelites founded a hermitage and monastery called Desierto de los Leones, today a museum and national park. At this time, the indigenous population of the area recovered enough that there were efforts to reclaim lost territory and government. To this end, a type of codex called "techialoayan" was created to document the history of indigenous communities to make legal claims. One of the most important of this is the Techialoyan Codex of Cuajimalpa. It describes a solemn meeting of authorities to confirm the extension and political organization of the area. Written in Nahuatl, it remained a valid legal document until 1865, when then Emperor Maximilian I had it translated into Spanish. Today the original document is part of the Mexican Federal Archives. In 1997, the document was named as part of the “Memory of the World” by UNESCO .

From the colonial period into the 19th and early 20th centuries, the most common economic activities in the area were the harvesting of firewood and the making of charcoal, with some raising of crops and livestock for domestic consumption. The area was also important as a way station, providing lodging and food to travelers between the Valley of Mexico and the Toluca Valley. In 1884, a rail line was constructed through the same area.

In the early 19th century, the first insurgent army under Miguel Hidalgo y Costilla arrived at the area, with Hidalgo himself staying at the Mesón San Luisito. The town of Cuajimalpa was made the seat of a municipality in 1862. During the last decades of the 19th century and into the 20th modern services such as running water, paved roads and electric lighting were introduced. A number of industries related to construction supplies were also founded.

During the Mexican Revolution there were clashes in the area between forces loyal to Venustiano Carranza and Emiliano Zapata in El Contadero and San Pedro. One story from the time says that the Zapatistas cut the ears of the inhabitants of the town of Cuajimalpa to distinguish them from those loyal to Carranza.

In 1929, the area's status was changed from municipality to borough with the reorganization of the Federal District of Mexico City. Although it remained very rural until the 1930s, its main economic activities were in decline with many moving to Mexico City.

Prior to the 1950s, urbanization of the area was limited because of its terrain. In the mid 20th century, the industrialization of the Valley of Mexico began to reach the borough of Cuajimalpa. The population of the area increased over 900% from 1950 to 1980, with the highest rate of growth in the 1970s. New residential construction fueled the growth, covering former forest and agricultural areas especially in areas such as San Lorenzo Acopilco, Las Lajas, La Pila, Las Maromas, Xalpa, Cola de Pato, Atliburros, Cruz Blanca, Moneruco, Chancocoyotl, Teopazulco, Tlapeaca, Texcalco and Pito Real. These include large residential subdivisions such as El Contadero and Lomas de Vista Hermosa, as well as unregulated settlements on the sides of hills and small canyons. The pace of growth remained high in the 1980s, in part due to the 1985 earthquake, which prompted many to move away from the soft soils of the city center into the more solid rock of the west and south of the valley. However, the rapid development began to cause environmental problems, including the building over former pit mines which had later been used as landfills. In the 1990s, efforts were begun to regulate growth and protect natural areas. Much of the territory has been urbanized and contains some of the city's most expensive residential and commercial real estate, with newer developments for upper classes pushing out lower income groups.

In the 1990s and 2000s there were changes in the borough's borders due to the settlements of disputes between the Federal District and the State of Mexico.

== Geography ==
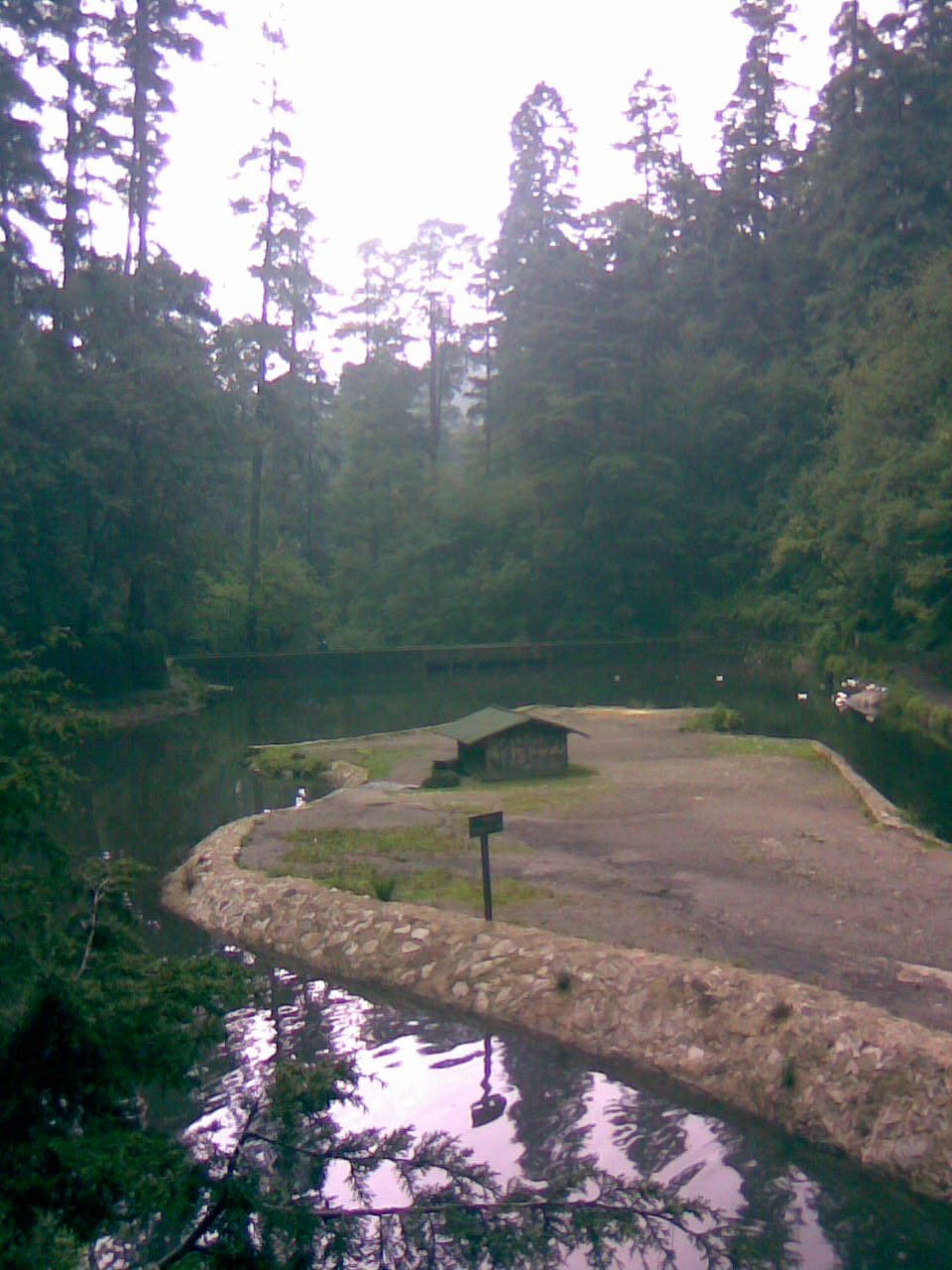
In the Desierto de los Leones National Park

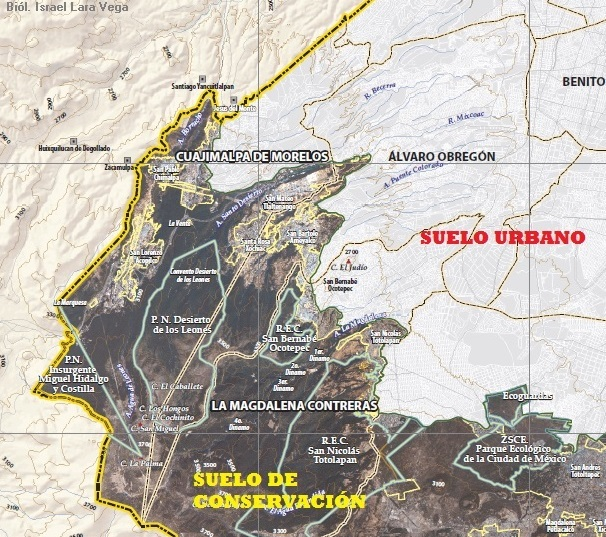
Map showing area of conservation

The Cuajimalpa borough is located on the west side of the Federal District of Mexico City. To the west of it are the municipalities of Ocoyoacac and Huixquilucan de Degollado in the State of Mexico. It also borders the boroughs of Miguel Hidalgo, Alvaro Obregon and Magdalena Contreras in the Federal District. The borough covers an area of 8,905 hectares, just over five percent of the total of the Federal District.

The borough is situated on the east side of the Sierra de las Cruces, a volcanic mountain range which separates the Federal District of Mexico City from the State of Mexico and has an average elevation of 2,750 meters above sea level. The terrain is very rugged with mountain peaks mostly found in the center and south. These include La Palma (3,810 masl), San Miguel (3,800 masl), El Cochinito (3,760 masl) and El Ángel (3,330 masl). The land mostly consists of volcanic rock with small valleys and canyons that contain sedimentary deposits; however, there is no longer volcanic activity.

The area contains many fissures, natural caverns and small canyons which are the result of tectonic forces and erosion. Most of these run from north-northeast to south-southwest. There are small flat areas suitable for agriculture such as around the towns of San Pablo Chimalpa and San Lorenzo Acopilco. The canyons are formed by the channeling of rainwater along fissures. There are two types of canyons: stable ones with wide bottoms and less steep slopes (mostly in the northeast) and V-shaped ones with steep unstable slopes, which can be found in various parts of the borough. The largest canyons are the Santo Domingo, Agua Azul, Los Helechos and Hueyatlaco. The borough contains seven "mini" basins called Arroyo Agua de Leones, Arroyo Santo Desierto, Río Tacubaya, Río Becerra, Río San Joaquín, Río Barrilaco and Río Magalenas. These are currents which channel rainwater along the rugged terrain with most running southwest to northeast. Three have their beginnings in the Sierra de las Cruces with the rest in the center or north of the territory. These streams and rivers then run into several other sections of Mexico City and into the State of Mexico. Because of the many cracks in the soil and rock, the borough is an important aquifer recharge area as well as the source of water for freshwater springs.

Cuajimalpa

Climate chart (precipitation, max. and min. temperature)
| J | F | M | A | M | J | J | A | S | O | N | D |
| 11 18 5 | 7 19 5 | 12 21 7 | 28 22 8 | 86 22 9 | 225 20 9 | 277 18 8 | 266 19 8 | 212 18 8 | 79 18 7 | 11 18 6 | 6 18 5 |
- █ Average max. and min. temperatures in °C
- █ Precipitation totals in mm
Imperial conversion
| J | F | M | A | M | J | J | A | S | O | N | D |
| 0.4 64 41 | 0.3 66 41 | 0.5 70 45 | 1.1 72 46 | 3.4 72 48 | 8.9 68 48 | 11 64 46 | 10 66 46 | 8.3 64 46 | 3.1 64 45 | 0.4 64 43 | 0.2 64 41 |
- █ Average max. and min. temperatures in °F
- █ Precipitation totals in inches

The climate ranges from temperate to cold and its mostly humid. Average annual temperatures vary between 10C and 12C with average annual precipitation varying from between 1,200mm and 1,500mm. The canyons have microclimates which tend to be moister because prevailing winds do not reach and dry them out.

About twenty percent of the borough is classified as conservation zone with the rest urbanized; however, thirty percent of the population lives in these areas. The area contains a number of threatened species of animal in the Valley of Mexico such as carpenter birds, hummingbirds, cacomistles and several species of lizard. The highest elevations, mostly encompassed by the Desierto de los Leones National Park, are the best conserved. This forest is an important source of oxygenation for the Valley of Mexico. The greatest environmental threat is the continuation of urban sprawl, which threatens forests and other protected areas. Areas which already have high levels of deforestation suffer significant erosion. Although there are official efforts in place to control building, illegal settlements are a significant concern, especially those on the edges of the national park.

== San Pedro Cuajimalpa and other communities in the borough ==
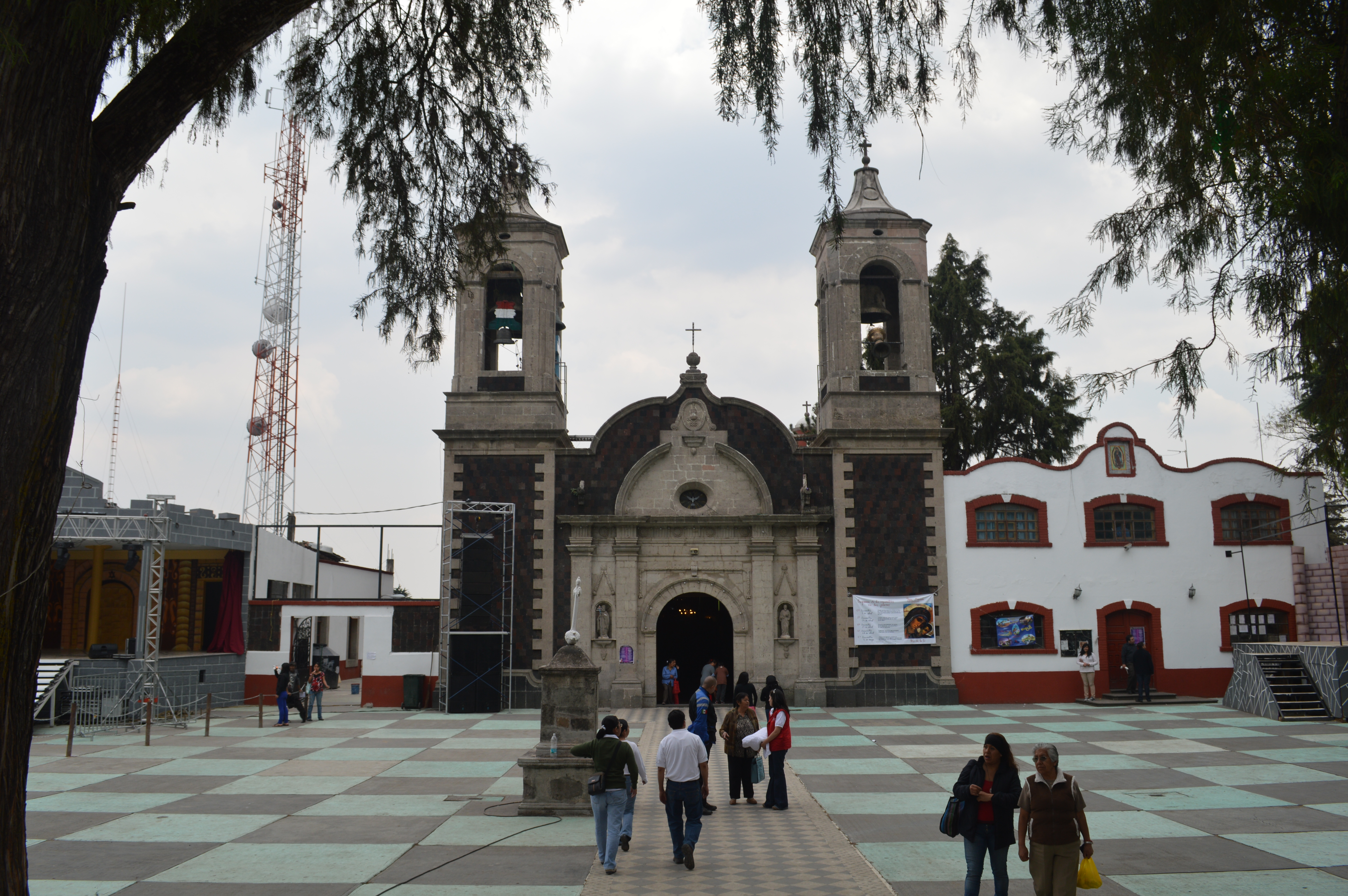
Facade of the Parish of San Pedro

The former rural town of San Pedro Cuajimalpa still maintains a distinct identity although it has been fully incorporated into the urban sprawl of Mexico City. The town used the Techialoyan Codex of Cuajimalpa, written in Classical Nahuatl at the end of the 17th century, "to prove its rights to its lands, which it retained until 1865." Its main road is called Avenida Juárez, the oldest road in the borough, and connects the former town center to the old Mexico City-Toluca highway. While only very few of the old traditional houses remain (two on the corner of Avenida Juarez and Coahuila Street with a few next to Jardín Hidalgo), the historic center of the town still exists. It was named a "Barrio Mágico" in 2011.

The historic center contains a traditional Mexican market, the main plaza and the borough hall and former municipal palace. The center also contains an open-air stage called the Foro Pedro Infante. It is named after a 20th-century film star who made part of a movie called Vuelven los García on the spot. Jardín Hidalgo is next to the main plaza and the San Pedro Parish. It is a small space filled with trees and a kiosk. The borough hall contains the Miguel Hidalgo y Costilla Museum. It contains copies of the Techialoyan Codex of Cuajimalpa among other items. Originally the museum was as at a former inn called the Mesón de San Luisito, where Miguel Hidalgo stayed after the Battle of Monte de las Cruces. One modern addition to the historic center was a public skate park behind the borough offices opened in 2013.

The historic center is still dominated by the Parish of San Pedro, the oldest church in the borough. It was founded in the 16th century but the current building was begun in 1628 and completely finished in 1925. The atrium is paved and has only a few trees. The portal is Neoclassic with a frieze formed by metopes and triglyphs from ancient Greek architecture, along with a thick cornice. The main entrance has a niche on each side. A truncated arch is found above the cornice and the base has the papal seal which alludes to Saint Peter, the patron saint. The rest of the facade is covered in red tezontle stone and there are two bell towers. The interior has a single nave. On the main altar, there is an image of Saint Peter, the patron on the town, inside a cypress. The vaults and cupola of the ceiling have simple ornamentation, the side walls have various oil paintings and there are a number of images of various saints.

San Pablo Chimalpa is one of the two oldest settlements of the borough. Its name comes from Nahuatl which means "place of the shield." Oral tradition states it was founded in 1532 by a warrior named Chimalli and Viceroy Antonio de Mendoza when land was being redistributed.

San Mateo Tlaltenango is located high in the Sierra de las Cruces next to the Desierto de los Leones. The name Tlaltenango comes from Nahuatl and means "en the walls of the earth." The area has been occupied since the pre-Hispanic period. The current town was founded in 1532 by Hernán Cortés, with Viceroy Enrique de Almanza taking possession in 1571.

San Lorenzo Acopilco dates to the pre Hispanic period, reorganized by the conquistadors.

El Contadero dates to at least 1753 and is located on a hill on the west side of the Chapultepec forest. It began as a single house which some historians state was the main house of a hacienda despite its small size. In the 20th century, the house served as a store, inn, and cantina serving travelers on the Mexico City-Toluca road. Today the area is a small town with a few streets.

== Landmarks ==
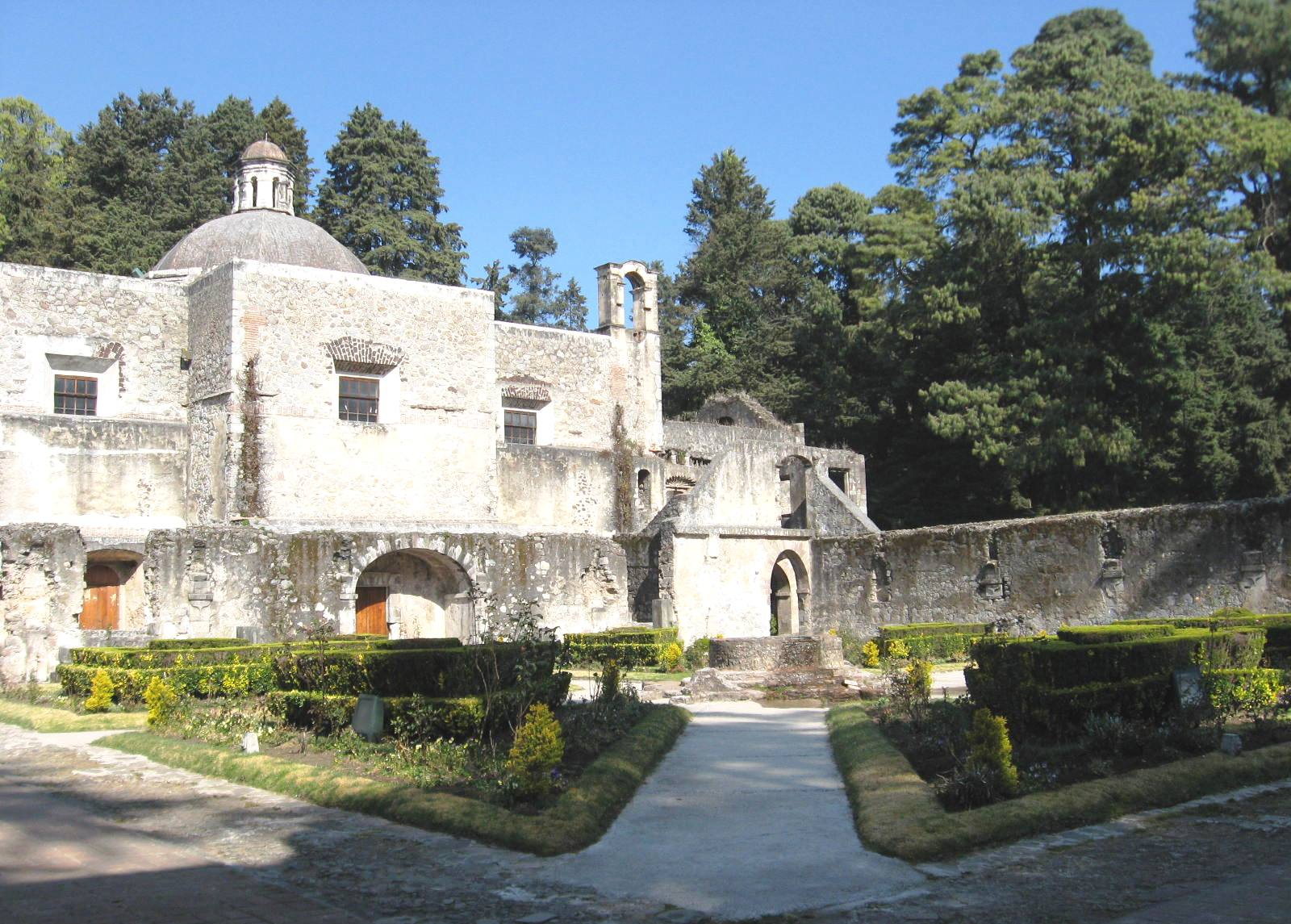
Chapel of the former monastery

The major attraction of the borough is the Desierto de los Leones, which is home to a former monastery and retreat. In 1606, the Carmelites constructed a hermitage and monastery high up in the mountains of the Sierra de las Cruces. The name literally means :Desert of the Lions." "Desert" is what Carmelites called remote retreats. The "lions" are from the surname of two brothers over which the monks had a dispute over the land. It remained an isolated retreat until 1814. Then the site became a hospital administered by the Company of Jesus. Today the buildings of the former monastery are home to three museums, one dedicated to the site, one to the bicentennial of Mexico's Independence and one to the Mexican Revolution. The site is surrounded by the Desierto de los Leones National Park, the first such declared in Mexico in 1917 by Venustiano Carranza. The park extends over 1,500 hectares with mountain peaks and canyons forested with pine and holm oak. Services of the park include the Peteretes Ecological Center and an area with restaurants selling local specialties. The Desierto receives over 300,000 visitors per year with the busiest times being Holy Week and December.

The Rancho los Laureles Ecotourism Park is also in the borough. It has camping and areas for bonfires and picnics. It also has areas for mountain biking, paintball and a petting zoo with deer.

== Festivals and events ==
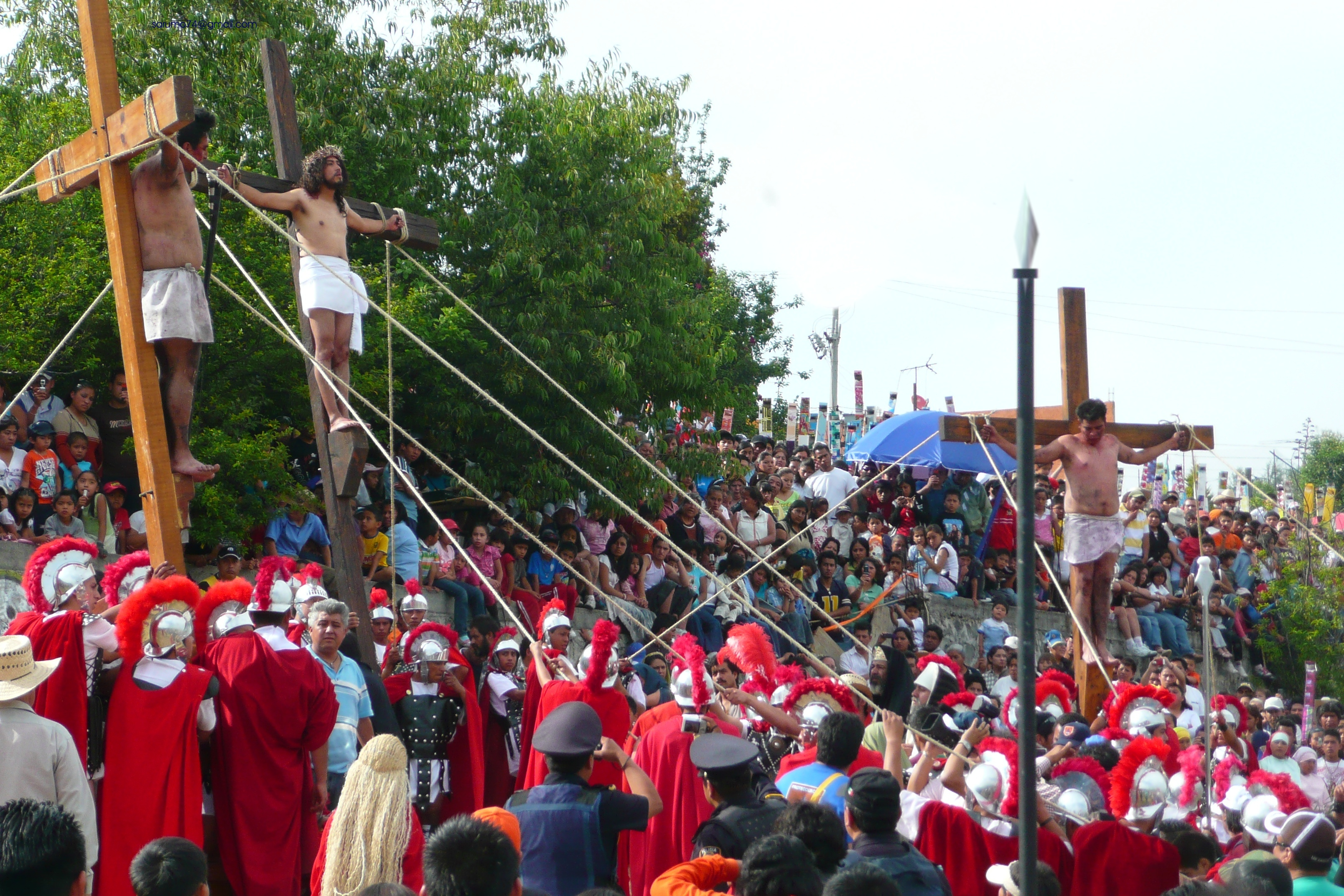
Crucifixion scene on Good Friday in Cuajimalpa

The largest and most important annual event of the borough is the passion play and fair, the 100th edition of which was held in 2013. For the entire event, between 1.5 and 2 million people visit the town with 500,000 people for Good Friday alone. The passion play is the second largest in Mexico City after that of Iztapalapa. The passion play involves over 200 people in various speaking and non-speaking roles and locals design and make the sets. The fair occurs for the entire week, featuring local products such as handcrafts and food. During Holy Week, the sale of alcohol is banned in the borough, including nightclubs and bars.

The reenactments include events related to Jesus's entrance to Jerusalem on Palm Sunday, and the washing of feet and the Last Supper on Maundy Thursday. The two most important days are Good Friday and Holy Saturday. The Good Friday procession extends for two kilometers and ends with the scene of the crucifixion. The cross carried by the actor playing Jesus weighs about ninety kilos. The most distinctive part of Cuajimalpa's Holy Week is Holy Saturday. Four young men are chosen each year to play Judas, two over 18 and two under. They dress in red, wear a mask and carry a whip. Judas represents evil but those chosen to play the role are considered to have the greatest responsibility, watching over others in the passion play procession on Good Friday and help with coordination. Their tasks begin at 8am when they "rob" various stands related to the traditional fair although in reality the items are donated by the vendors. These usually include utensils and toys. Then those playing Roman soldiers go and look for Judas to arrest; however, locals then offer the Judas's their houses to hide and often to eat and drink. At about 2 pm the Judas's are corralled by the soldiers and brought to the parish church of San Pedro. At 3 pm the captured Judas's are "hung" from the bell tower but then people come to the atrium to donate money for their release, often receiving one of the "stolen" items from the fair in return. One last aspect is a flogging but only for the older men playing Judas. The more traditional burning of Judas also occurs on this day, but in competition with Iztapalapa, the borough has also added a fireworks show along with monumentally sized Judas figures.

Other important events related to the religious calendar is Carnival, held just before Lent, and for the Christmas season, there is a "Christmas village" set up in the historic center, completely with ice rink and toboggan slide.

The borough also hosts an annual Feria del Hongo dedicated to the gastronomy of native mushrooms in late summer at the borough hall plaza and the Desierto de los Leones. This event has been promoted in various ways, including a series of tickets by the National Lottery.

== Education ==
The borough has various public and private institutions of higher education including the Colegio de Empresarios Excelentia Fervic, the Instituto de Hematopatología, the Instituto Nacional de Administración Pública (INAP), the Universidad del Valle de México, Campus Santa Fe and the Universidad Hebarica. In the 2000s, the Universidad Autónoma Metropolitana added a Cuajimalpa campus. It offers ten undergraduate degrees and seven postgraduate degrees in three academic divisions (Sciences of Communication and Design, Natural Sciences and Engineering and Social Sciences and Humanities).

Public high schools of the Instituto de Educación Media Superior del Distrito Federal (IEMS) include:

- Escuela Preparatoria Cuajimalpa "Josefa Ortiz de Domínguez"

Private schools:

- Cuajimalpa campus of Peterson Schools (Lomas de Vistahermosa)
- Westhill Institute Santa Fe campus (Santa Fe)
- Eton School Elementary through High School campus (Santa Fe)
- Colegio del Bosque México in Bosques de las Lomas
- Colegio Ciudad de México Plantel Contadero
- Colegio Monteverde (Santa Fe)
- Colegio Franco Inglés (Vista Hermosa)
- Colegio Vista Hermosa (Lomas de Vista Hermosa)
- Colegio Hebreo Maguen David
- Colegio Hebreo Sefaradí
- Colegio Hebreo Tarbut
- Colegio Israelita de México
- Colegio Eugenio de Mazenod
- Instituto Cumbres México
- Instituto Rosedal Vista Hermosa
- Pinecrest Institute (Santa Fe) - Preschool to secundaria
- Comunidad Educativa Tomas Moro Plantel Maguey

== Transportation ==
Main roads include the toll federal road connecting Mexico City and Toluca, Prolongación Paseo de la Reforma, Avenida Vasco de Quiroga and the Chamapa-La Venta highway. Because of urbanization and the thru traffic between Mexico City and Toluca, there is significant congestion. The most pressing traffic problems are those in the historic center of Cuajimalpa and traffic between the rest of Mexico City and Toluca particularly during rush hours.

The most important bus lines include routes 4, 5, 76 and 80 of the RTP system.

The El Insurgente commuter rail has a stop in Santa Fe.

== Socioeconomics ==
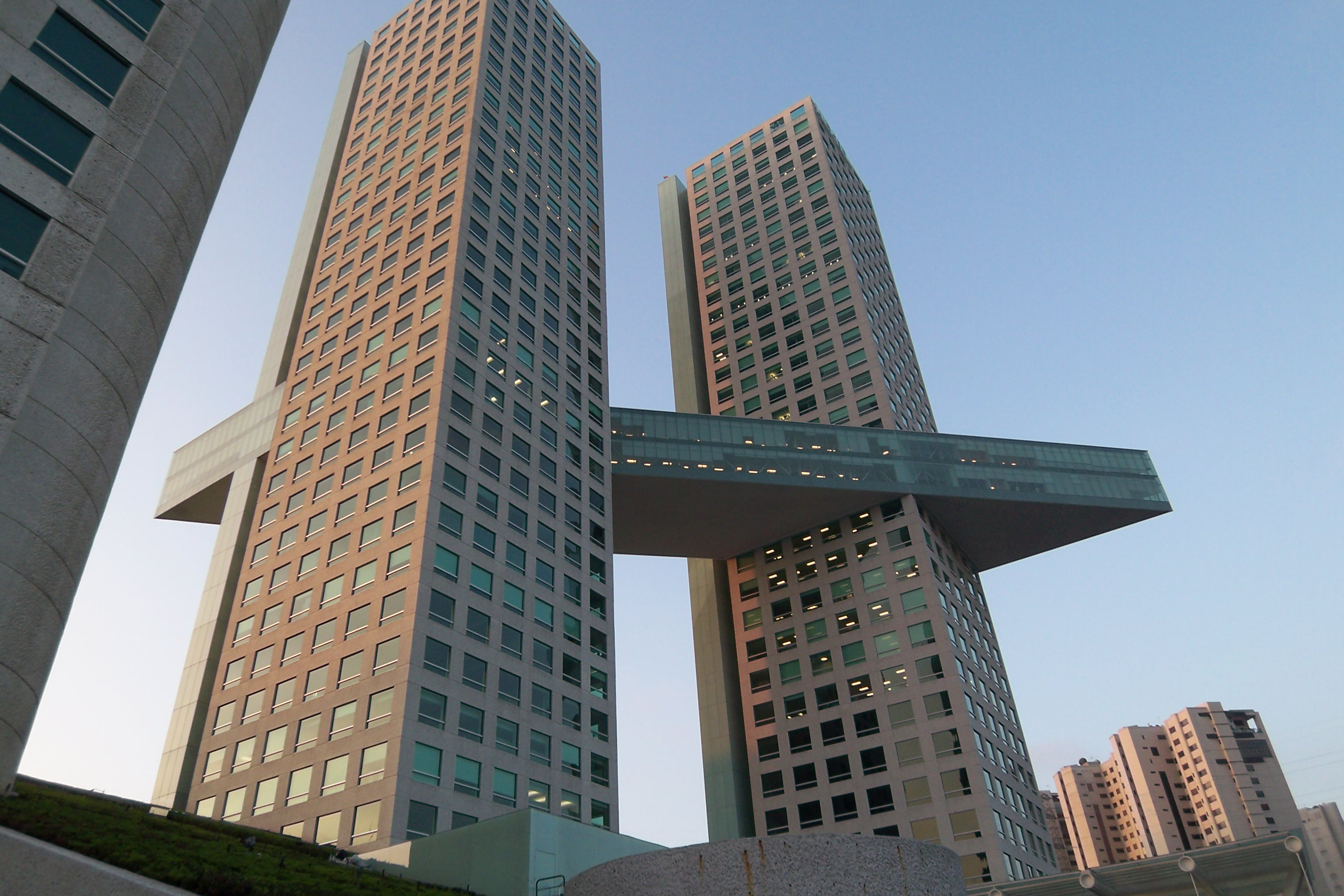
Torre Arcos 2

There are areas of great wealth near areas populated by lower classes. Cuajimalpa is the most expensive place to buy a house or apartment in Mexico City with the average square meter costing 55% more than the average for the rest of the city. However, prices vary widely within the borough between developments for the most wealthy and areas which are still poor.

== Borough chiefs and mayors ==
=== Borough chiefs ===
- 2000–2003: Francisco de Souza Mayo
- 2003–2006: Ignacio Ruiz López
- 2006–2009: José Remedios Ledesma García
- 2009–2012: Carlos Orvañanos Rea
- 2012–2015: Adrián Rubalcava Suárez
- 2015–2018: Miguel Ángel Salazar Martínez

=== Mayors ===
- 2018–2024: Adrián Rubalcava Suárez
- Since 2024: Carlos Orvañanos Rea
