= Cumbres Institute =

Series of schools in Mexico

Cumbres Institute (in Spanish: Instituto Cumbres) is a series of Catholic and bilingual schools. The first Cumbres Institute was founded in Mexico City, Mexico, by the Legionaries of Christ founded by Marcial Maciel in 1954, in the neighborhood of Lomas de Chapultepec. Many years later, there were many campuses extending all over Mexico and other Latin American countries such as Brazil, Chile, Spain, and Venezuela. The first Cumbres campus was founded in Lomas de Chapultepec in 1954 with the name of “Instituto Cumbres de Lomas”. In recent years, the Cumbres Institute has been involved in controversy. Particularly noteworthy is the fight that occurred in June 2017 between students of the school against students of the Irish Institute of Mexico City. Due to these and other incidents, Instituto Cumbres decided to change its name to Prepa Anahuac, associating itself with Universidad Anahuac.

== Schools ==
- Instituto Cumbres Lomas
- Instituto Cumbres De Caracas
- Instituto Cumbres Mėxico (with Instituto Rosedal Vista Hermosa)
- Instituto Cumbres Bosques
- Instituto Cumbres y Godwin Mėrida
- Instituto Cumbres San Javier (with Instituto Alpes San Javier)
- Instituto Cumbres y Alpes Querėtaro
