= Colegio Olamí ORT =

Location
- Loma del Recuerdo no. 44; Vista Hermosa; Cuajimalpa; Mexico City; Mexico; 19°22′49.4″N 99°16′08.4″W

Information
- Religious affiliation: Judaism

The Colegio Olamí ORT is a private educational institution that belongs to ORT, a global educational network present in more than 30 countries, preparing people and communities for a self-sufficient and meaningful future.

It was in 2022 after the merger of the Colegio Israelita de México and the Colegio Hebreo Sefaradí.

The School ranges from Preschool to High School. It is currently located in Loma del Recuerdo no. 44 in Vista Hermosa, Mexico City.

== History ==
The Colegio Israelita de México was founded in 1924, when a group of immigrants decided to create an educational institution for the children of Jewish immigrants arriving in Mexico.

The school first operated in Colombia No. 39; it moved to Colombia No. 12 from 1925 through 1927. It then moved to Naranjo no. 267 and grew significantly during the 1930s, with the first 6th grade graduation taking place in 1933. In 1935, it moved to San Lorenzo no. 290, where it would remain until the 1970s. It then moved to its current location in Vista Hermosa.

The school began to operate a Secundaria (grades 7 through 9) in 1936, with the first 9th grade graduation taking place in 1938. It also began operating a kindergarten in 1936. The school added a Preparatoria (grades 10 and 11) in 1948, and when Mexico switched to a 12 grade system in the mid 1960s, it added a grade 12.

Its name was changed to CIM-ORT in the early 21st century. In 2022 it merged with the Colegio Hebreo Sefaradí and became the current institution.

Colegio Hebreo Sefaradí was founded in the mid-20th century by Mexico City's Sephardic Jewish community to provide Jewish education aligned with their cultural and religious heritage.

The school originally operated in Progreso 23, Col. Florida for many decades before moving its main campus in Lomas del Chamizal, Cuajimalpa. Over the years, it expanded to include pre-school, primary, secondary, and high school levels, combining the Mexican national curriculum with Judaic and Hebrew studies focused on Sephardic traditions.

In 2022, both institutions merged to form the Colegio Olamí ORT, which together with ORT University Mexico represent World ORT in Mexico.
