= Desierto de los Leones National Park =

National park in Mexico

- IUCN category II (national park)
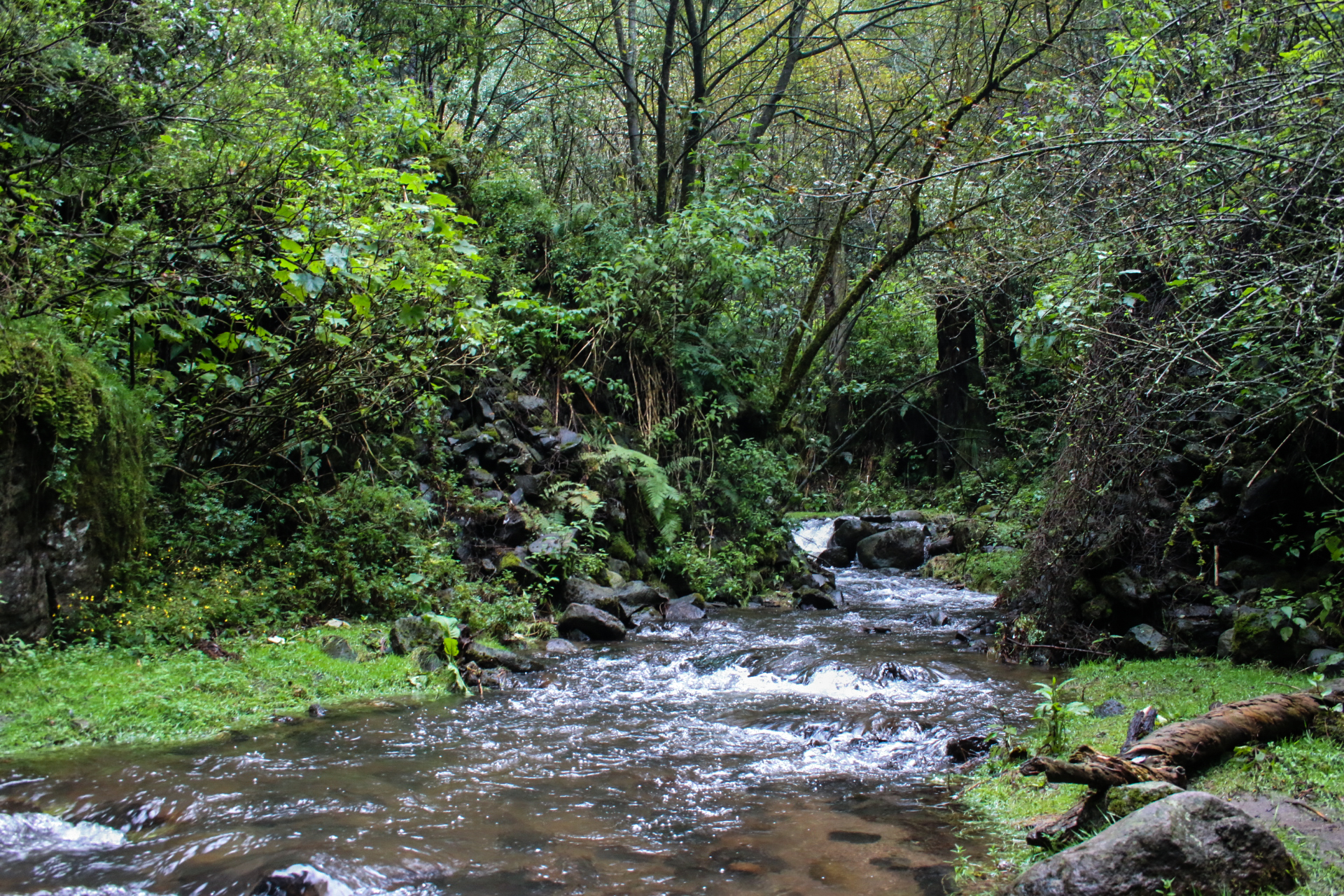
- A river flowing from a spring.

- Location within Mexico City urban area
- Interactive map of Desierto de los Leones National Park
- Location: Cuajimalpa / Álvaro Obregón, Distrito Federal, Mexico
- Nearest city: Mexico City
- Coordinates: 19.31264°N 99.30628°W
- Area: 1,866 hectares (4,610 acres)
- Established: November 27, 1917
- Governing body: Secretariat of the Environment and Natural Resources

Desierto de los Leones (Desert of the Lions) National Park is located entirely within the limits of Mexico City; it stretches between Cuajimalpa and Álvaro Obregón boroughs. It is located in the Sierra de las Cruces mountain range west of the city center with an area of 1,867 hectares, representing fifteen percent of the entire Valley of Mexico. The term Desierto (‘desert’) is used in this context in the archaic sense of “wild, sparsely populated area” rather than in reference to an arid environment. Leones (‘Lions’) refers not to the big cats but rather to the original landlord's surname.

The park's altitude varies between 2,600 and 3,700 meters above sea level, giving the area a relatively cold and damp climate. It is a forested area primarily with pines, oyamel firs and oaks with many brooks, ravines and waterfalls. The park is considered to be the oldest protected biosphere in Mexico. It was originally declared a forest reserve in 1876 by President Lerdo de Tejada with the intent of conserving its fresh water springs to supply Mexico City. It was later declared a national park on 27 November 1917, by President Venustiano Carranza.

== History ==
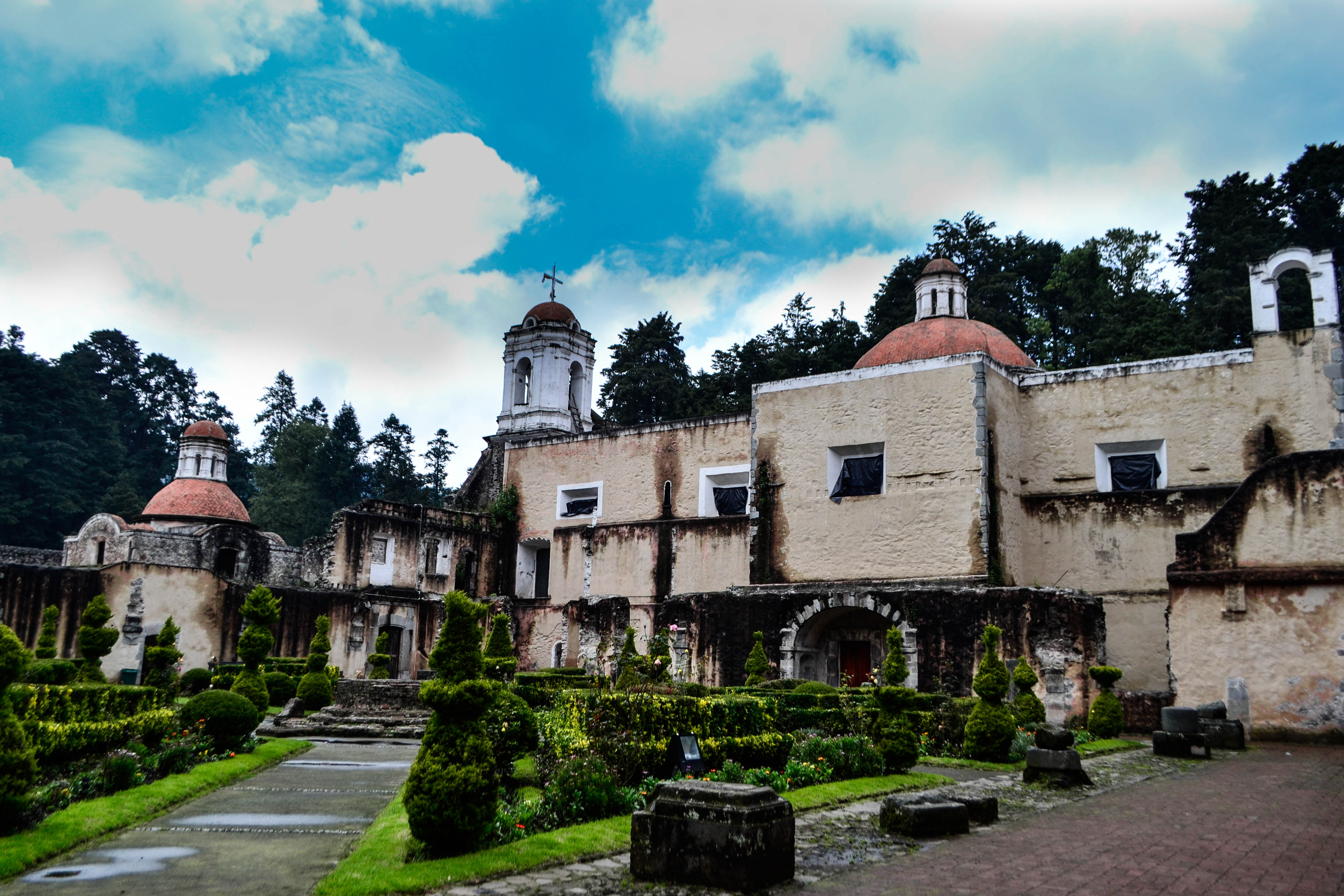
View from the side of the Convent.

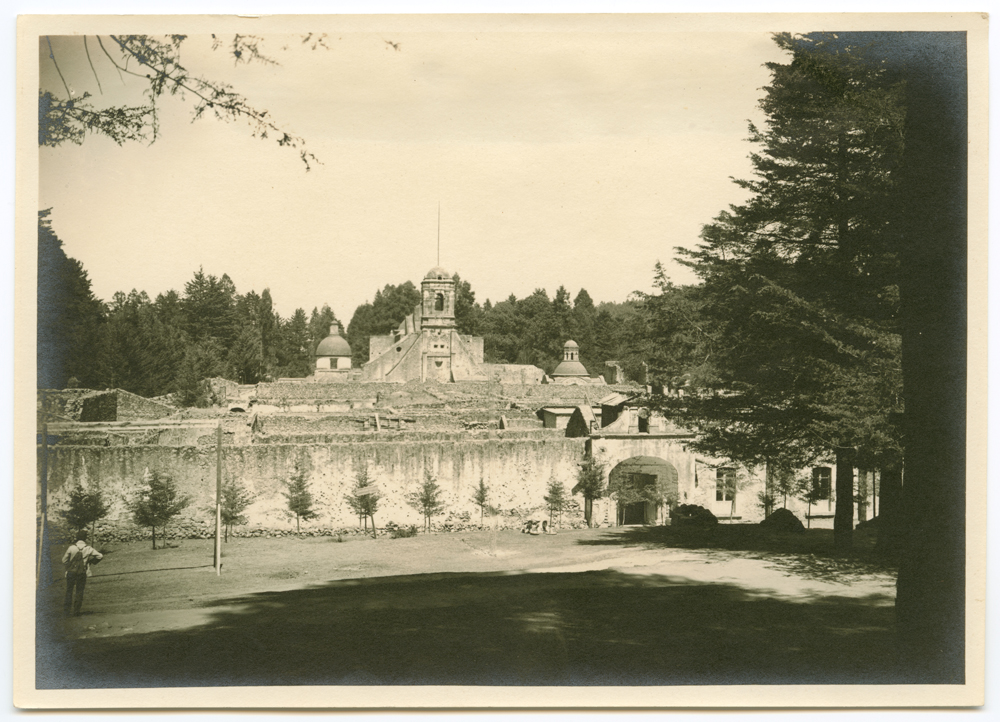
The convent (c. 1906–1920).

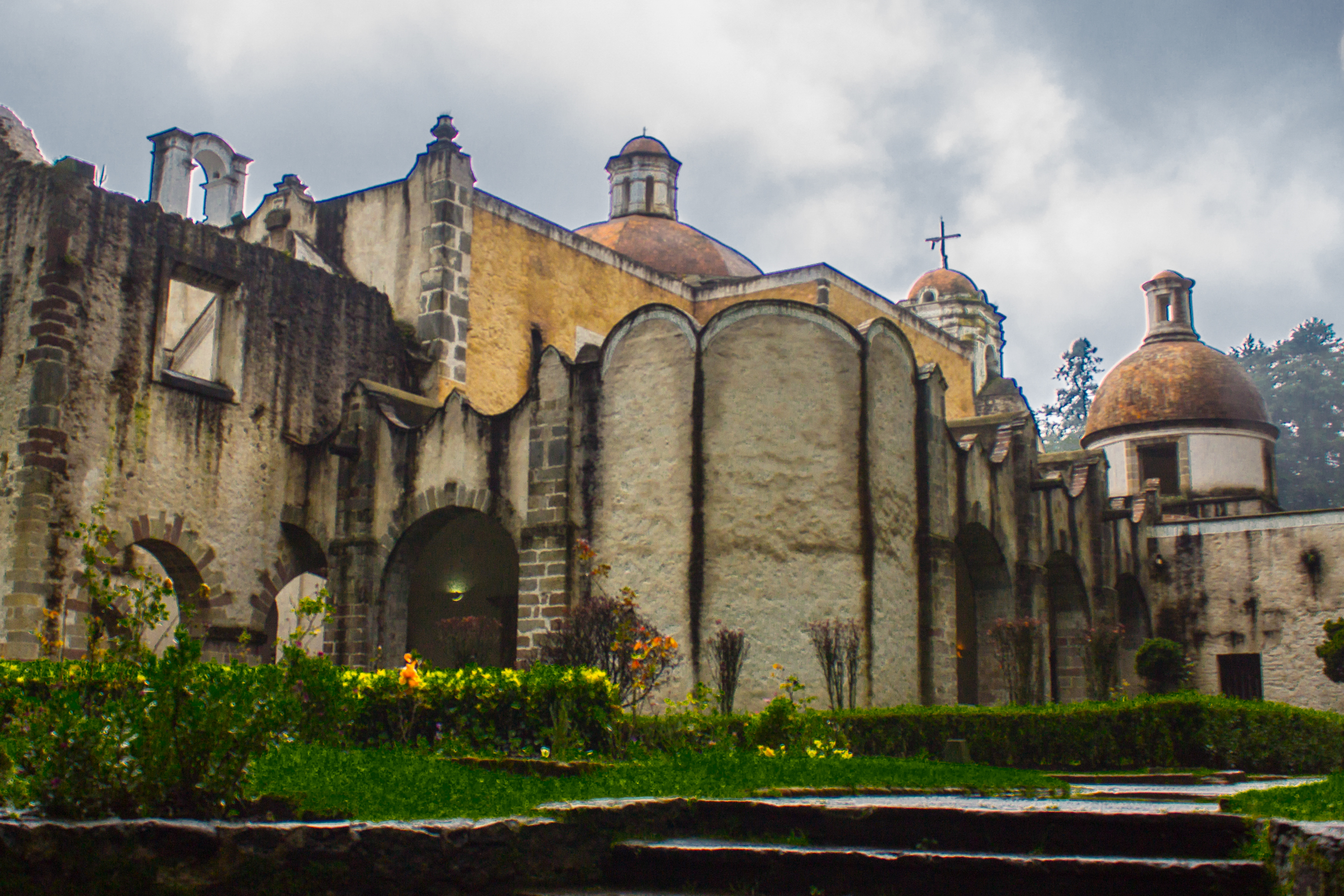
Facade of the convent

The original name was "Desierto de Nuestra Señora del Carmen de los Montes de Santa Fe".

The first stone was laid on January 23, 1606, which started the construction of the first convent, the 10 hermitages (El Portón, La Soledad, San José, San Elías, San Juan, Magdalena, Trinidad, Getsemaní, San Alberto y San Miguel) and the wall that encircles the area.

The convent had two levels and was built by the Friar Andrés de San Miguel. Since the place presented complicated weather conditions, by 1722, this structure had greatly deteriorated. As a result, it was demolished and a new one was built in its place adjoining just south of the original complex, the current convent completing in 1814. Just when the war of independence had begun in 1810, the Carmelites order had to abandon its peaceful convent. The property was given to the government of the city to be used as military headquarters that lasted until the beginning of the 19th century.

The post-reform government was aware of the area's resource exploitation, which had been used to fulfill the demand of the city. As a result, the mountain was declared a forest reserve area and of public interest in the year 1876. After the revolution began, President Venustiano Carranza named the mountain a national park on November 15, 1917.

The monastery was declared a national monument in 1937 during the mandate of President Lazaro Cardenas.

With the growth of the city to the western valley of Mexico and the need for natural spaces, the Mexican government has sought for the expansion and preservation of this important place. On December 19, 1983, President Miguel de la Madrid Hurtado decreed the expropriation of 1,529 acres which were assigned to the preservation, development and beautification of the Desierto de los Leones. Subsequently, due to fires in some of the areas in 1998, the structure suffered deterioration which then became an ecological restoration zone within an area of approximately 400 acres.

On April 16, 1999, the Secretary of Environment and Natural Resources (SEMARNAT) signed the coordination agreement where the Federal Government transferred the full administration of the "Desierto de los Leones" National Park to the local government, which was formalized with the Delivery and Reception Act on November 24, 2000.

== Decree ==
In 1876, the then President of Mexico Sebastian Lerdo de Tejada, enacts Desierto de los Leones as an ecological reserve in order to protect existing natural springs and provide water to Mexico City. With this decree, Desierto de los Leones became the first Natural Protected Area in Mexico.

After the Mexican Revolution in 1917, the forest Desierto de los Leones became the first National Park in the country.

The Decree by which the area known as Desierto de los Leones is constituted as a National Park was published in the Official Gazette of November 17, 1917 designating with it an area of 1,529 hectares under President Venustiano Carranza's rule.

The first article of the decree stipulates that Desierto de los Leones would now be named as Desierto de los Leones National Park.

The second article states that the management, conservation and improvement of the park would now be in charge of the Ministry of Public Works. With the exception of historical ruins, whose care and conservation would depend on the Ministry of Communication and Public Works.

The last article authorizes the Ministry of Public Works to exploit resources within the park, such as dead, diseased, defective or outdated trees, and those which can alter the development of the forest. They would be able to improve the park using their own products. Also, Ministry of Public Works would be the only one allowed to cut trees among the park. The Secretariat is not authorized to contract or grant permissions to individuals for the exploitation of these resources, neither is for hunting and livestock grazing.

== Geography ==
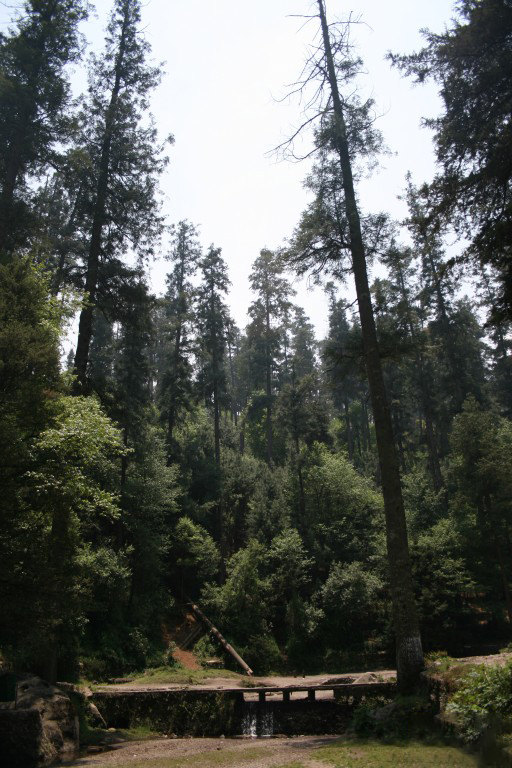

The park is located in the Federal District of Mexico City distributed between the boroughs of Cuajimalpa and Álvaro Obregón. Its altitude varies between 2,600 and 3,700 meters above sea level. The park is seven km long, three km wide with an area of 1,867 hectares. It is one of the most important natural areas of the Federal District, protecting much of the Sierra de las Cruces mountain range and represents about 15% of the Valley of Mexico. The climate of the park is relatively cold and damp due to its altitude. It rains here daily much of the year and fog is common year round. Because of this climate and the rugged terrain, it has many ravines, brooks, streams and a number of waterfalls.

=== Topography ===
The Desierto de los Leones National Park is located in the center of Mexico to the southwest of the Mexico's Basin. It is part of the Sierra de las Cruces geomorphological unit, which at the same time is part of the Trans-Mexican Volcanic Belt. The two mountain ranges form part of the topographic composition of the park. Both of these ranges have their origin in the San Miguel hill. The first range is formed by three hills: El Caballete, Los Hongos y Colorado hills. The hills Cruz de Colica, Xometla and Ocotal integrate the second range, which has a northwest orientation. All these hills converge into the Santo Desierto stream and are separated by three ravines. The park is located in one of the regions with the highest altitude above sea level in all of Mexico City. The terrain descends in altitude from south to north with an elevation of 3,790 m.a.s.l (meters above sea level) and connects with the area of the former monastery at an elevation of 2,700 m.a.s.l. The protected area has a medium altitude of 3,500 meters above sea level. The main hills of The Desierto de los Leones National Park are shown in the following table:

| Hill | Altitude (Meters above sea level) |
|---|---|
| La Venta | 2,860 |
| Antiguo Convento | 2,960 |
| Colorado Hill | 3,090 |
| Cruz Blanca | 3,160 |
| Cruz Blanca Hill | 3,180 |
| El Potrero | 3,250 |
| El Ocotal Hill | 3,530 |
| Xometla Hill | 3,560 |
| Cruz de Coloxtitla Hill | 3,500 |
| Cruz de Colica Hill | 3,610 |
| Los Hongos Hill | 3,680 |
| El Caballete Hill | 3,680 |
| San Miguel Hill | 3,790 |

=== Geology ===
The geology of the national park is composed of volcanic rocks from the Cenozoic Era, that was characterized by an intense volcanic activity. The movement of the tectonic plates that lie below the park caused the emergence of the Trans-Mexican Volcanic Belt. Due to the intense volcanic activity in the region where the park is located, the geologic deposits are composed of elements such as andesite, hypersthene, tephra, ash and volcanic sand.

=== Hydrography ===
There are several springs originated by the hillsides that make up the Desierto de los Leones.

These springs feed some rivers in the basin of the Valley of Mexico. Nowadays, with the expansion of urban areas and the need to find fresh water deposits by the Mexican population, some of the rivers and springs in the park are recklessly exploited.

Starting from the watercourses which are fed from the springs that flow into the Desierto de los Leones, two of the most important rivers of the Valley of Mexico originate in the park, the Mixcoac River and Rio Hondo, which are fed by the water of other streams that form the Agua de Leones Stream. There are three main water currents that flow through the hillsides which also establishes the park boundaries. The main water current emerges from San Miguel Hill and descends from a height of 3,700 meters. Along the way, the water current is fed from springs such as Caballete and Los Hongos. Two water currents originate from the Cerro de Cruz Colica and Xometla and another two water currents that flow through the glens are called Las Palomas and El Trozal.

The rich, natural resources of the Desierto de los Leones is undeniable and its available deposits of fresh water is the greatest virtues of the park. Diverse springs exists in which institutions such as the National Commission of Natural Protected Areas, CONAP, has sought to protect and restore the environmental damage that has been a constant threat.

A previous example is the Taza Vieja spring is located in middle of the park and composed by thirteen outcrops; Piletas, San Miguel, Zorrillas, Lagunillas, Lobos, Ruedas, Palmas, Llorona, La Portería, Monarcas, Otales, Arce y Capulines. The Leones Dam is composed by the following streams: Agua de Leones, De la Cruz y Llano Grande.

Finally, the famous Chorro de Agua is located at the eastern area of the park and it is merged with the springs Ajolotes, Agua de Peña and Agua de Gallinas.

== Wildlife ==
=== Flora ===
Plant life is mostly dominated by pines, oyamel firs and holm oaks which are surrounded by meadows. Due to forest fires, new tree species were introduced in the park as a measure of reforestation; the original species that stands out in most zones is the pinus patula which can be found in small populations.

One of the main problems the park faces, is the appearance of the bark beetle, a 3 mm insect that attacks pines. This insect causes plagues in forests by attacking trees that were damaged by fire or lightning strikes, then it starts reproducing itself and attacks healthy trees.

There have been 16 forest fires in the last 8 years that affected an average of 0.8 hectares of woods, although the biggest one was in 1998, which caused the loss of more than 500 hectares.

=== Mycology ===
Within Desierto de los Leones, approximately 102 species of fungi can be found. These species belong to the Ascomycota division, which is broken down in 6 different families and 47 types of Basidiomycota that have 22 families. Moreover, the division that has the most diversity of fungi is the Tricholomataceae, that has 18 species, followed by 10 species of Polyporaceae, 8 species of Amanitaceae, 7 species of Boletaceae, 6 species of Morchellaceae and 6 species of Pezizaceae.

The fungi in the region are either edible or poisonous, and every single one of them are of vital importance to the forest. Some of the edible species of fungi are Amanita caesarea, Boletus edulis and Lactarius deliciosus. Found among the poisonous species are Amanita gematta, Amanita muscaria and Amanita pantherina.

Furthermore, there are 7 species that are endangered:

- Morchella conica Pers. ex Fr
- Morchella elata Bull. ex Fr
- Morchella esculenta Pers. ex Fr
- Morchella costata (Vent.) Pers.
- Morchella angusticeps Peck
- Amanita muscaria (L. ex Fr.) Hook
- Boletus edulis (Bull. ex Fr.)

=== Fauna ===
There are 7 species of amphibians, 9 reptiles, around 30 mammals and almost a hundred of different birds. It has been reported that in the area consisting of the park and the southern part of the Valley of Mexico, there are at least 30 species of vertebrates that have been classified as endemic, and which half of them have been classified as in endangered or subject to a special protection species.

It is worth mentioning that all species of amphibians and reptiles are endemic, meaning that they only exist in this region, and many are in danger of extinction. Some mammals are Mexican squirrel, White-tailed Deer, Ring-tailed cat, opossums, rabbits, gophers, raccoons, coyotes, foxes, skunks, Bobcats, Mexican volcano mouse, Golden mouse, and Long-tailed shrew. Common birds are Red-tailed hawk, Steller's jay, American robin, American kestral, and Peregrine falcon. There are also several woodpeckers and flycatchers.

According to the National Biodiversity Information System of Comisión Nacional para el Conocimiento y Uso de la Biodiversidad (CONABIO) in Desierto de los Leones National Park there are over 750 plant and animal species from which 43 are in at risk category and 47 are exotics.

== As a recreational and ecotourism attraction ==
Inside the National Park, different recreational and environmental activities are offered to the visitors, including: camping, hiking, mountain biking, horse riding and trekking. Moreover, every month the park organizes special sport activities as 100 miles wild races, or the “Meta Desierto de los Leones”, a 10 kilometers long race.

To protect the endemic flora and fauna, diverse programs had been created to conserve vegetal and animal species. Reforestation is constantly carried out in zones where old trees have died because of plagues or wildfires. Also, some animals original from this forest, especially the deer, are being protected by taking care and feeding them in a safeguard place.

All of this activities are to escape from the everyday life in the city. In addition, the woods are always patrolled by the forest rangers, who cater for the visitors’ needs.

=== Directions ===
Parque Nacional Desierto de Los Leones is encompassed by the boroughs Cuajimalpa and Alvaro Obregon within Mexico City.

== Environmental situation ==
=== Background ===
From the announcement of the National Development Plan carried out by the government of the Mexican president Miguel de la Madrid, the protection over the natural areas in Mexico City was notoriously increased.

Some of the main aims of the plan are:

- To improve the quality of the environment for its inhabitants through the restoration and preservation of the ecological balance; this by the awareness of the good use of the forestry areas and green lands of the city, considering them as “lungs” and essentials for the preservation of life.
- To comprehend that the environmental pollution and the inadequate use of natural resources represents a permanent menace towards the people's health. This is translated on the unpostponable need to stop the environmental damage through the creation of legal regulations that observe the public authorities that work towards ecological preservation.

=== Nowadays ===
The national park Desierto de los Leones is one of the main green lands of Mexico City. Its wooded area represents 11.9% of the 15,702 hectares that make up the Mexican capital. Nevertheless, 26% of the park's structure is found damaged, because of the 205,000 visitors that come to the park each year.

Desierto de los Leones is divided in two areas, the first one corresponds to the public space, equivalent to 19% of the total surface which covers the ex-convent, the path to the desert and the white cross. On the other hand, the ecological restoration area counts with 1,233 hectares which represents the other 81% of the complete surface. This area contains the space devastated by the 1988 fire. Nowadays the park has presence of wildlife and some exotic plant species. However, it faces pollution problems, forest fires and messy water extraction.

A proper forest management is required in order to maintain the fauna and wild life due to a degree of deterioration showed nowadays and mainly caused by the pollution that comes from the urban area.

Wildlife in the Desierto de los Leones, although already scarce, is composed of hundreds of birds, 7 kinds of amphibians, 9 kinds of reptiles and about 30 mammals. It is found that in this region, some of the most important species that live here are the opossums, coyotes, raccoons, white-tailed deer, rabbits, among others.

The wildlife inhabiting in the Desierto de los Leones is mainly composed of stray dogs and they feed themselves on wild animals, which can cause disease transmission.

In relation to the disorderly water extraction, the region is considered moderate infiltration capacity for water, however, many of its springs are exploited to supply this resource to the urban area.

== Problems of the park ==
The forest area of the park has deteriorated due to natural and man-made reasons. Some of the natural problems include the arrival of a larva that strips barks from trees and residual problems from a forest fire in 1998, which destroyed about 450 hectares in the higher elevations of the park. Now there is a fire station called Brigada Regional Uno de la Delegación Cuajimalpa in the community of La Venta and an observation tower at San Miguel peak to watch for fires. There are also trees that are dying from acid rain. Other problems are man-made, as there is insufficient control over human activities in the forest. No one lives in the park proper but urban development has nearly surrounded the entire forest and over 16,000 people live right on the park's borders. There is insufficient vigilance and control of access especially in the southern section. Parts of the park are being used for pasture, garbage dumping, logging, and off-path mountain biking.

== Photo gallery ==
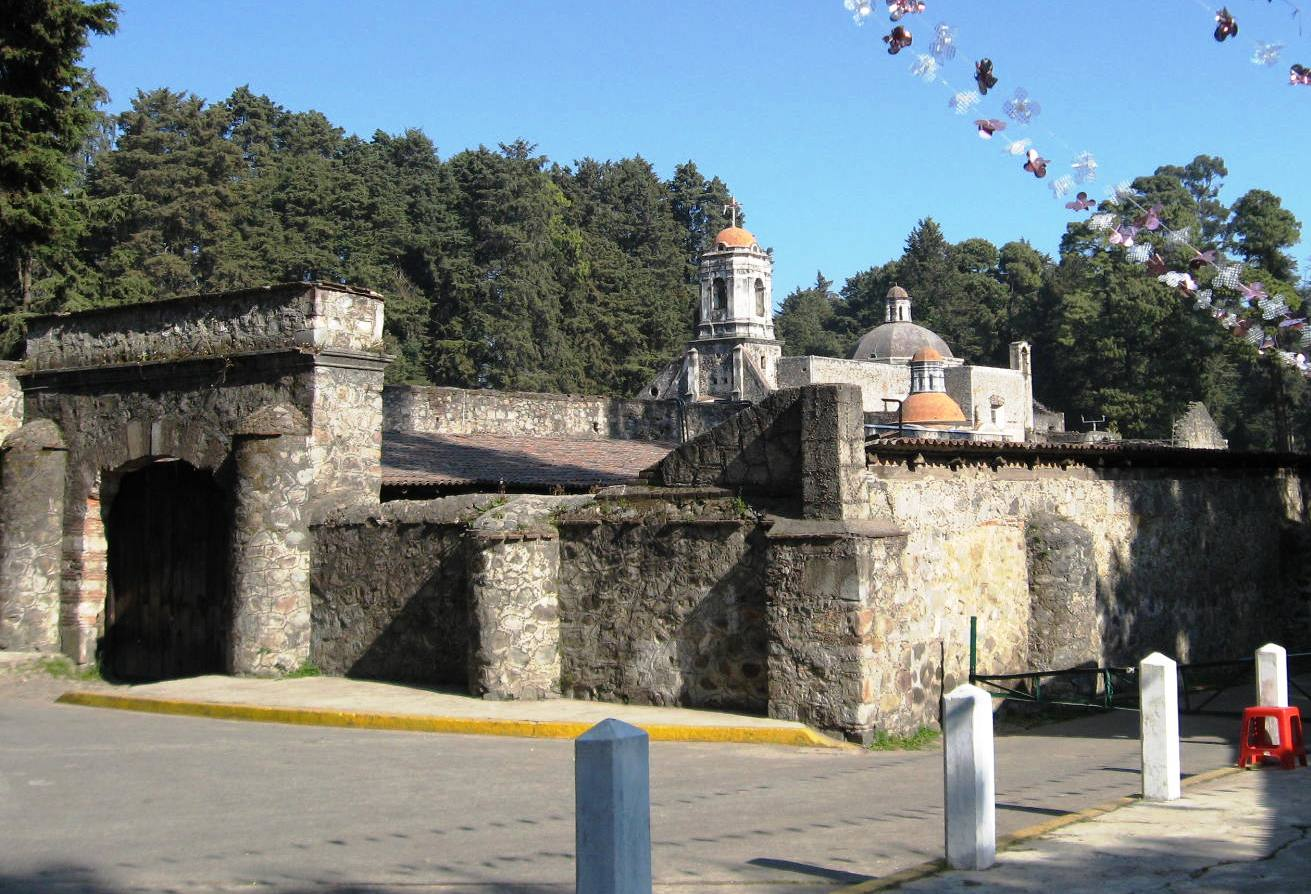
View of monastery from southwest

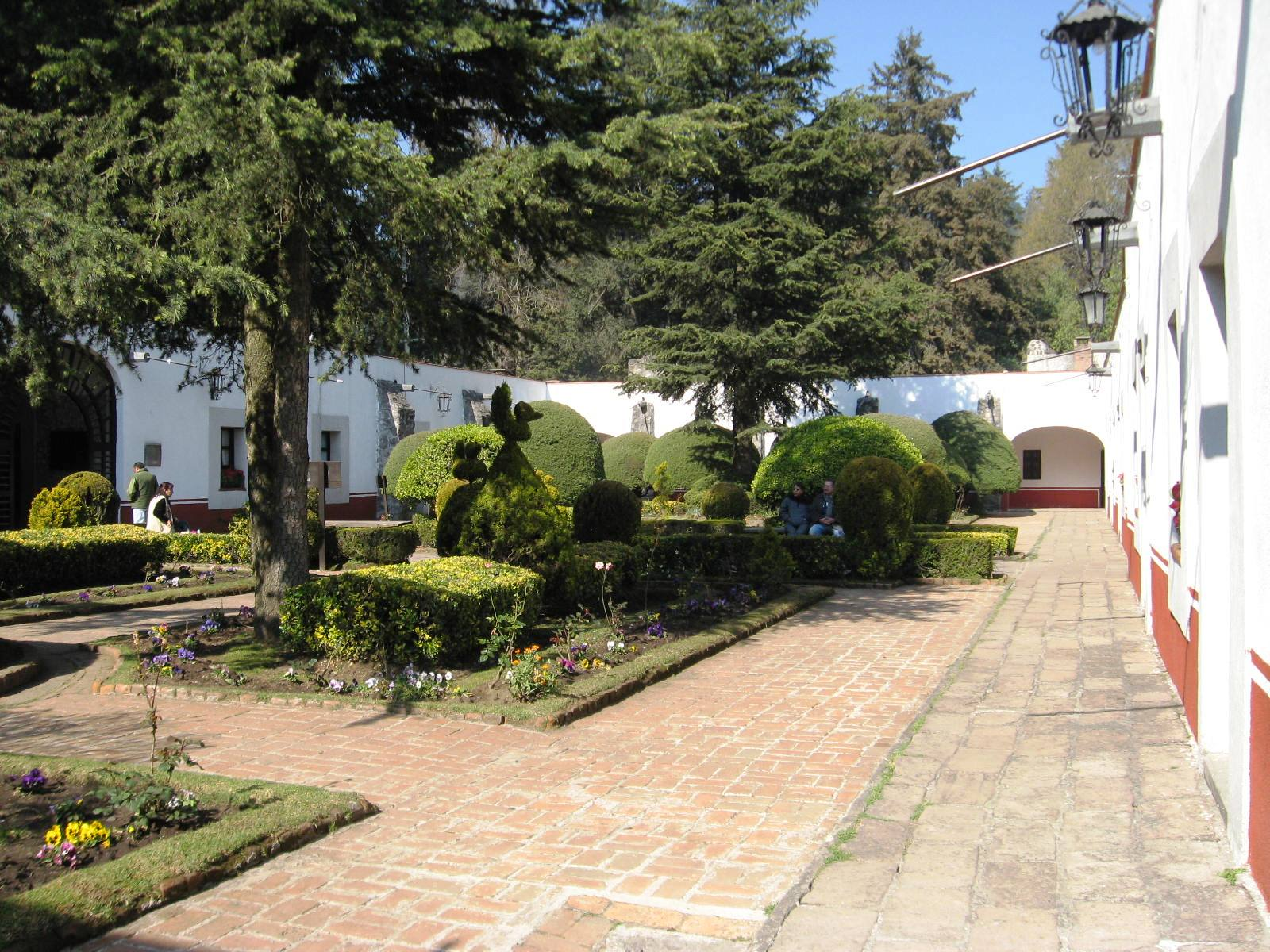
The Hospitality Garden located in the back of the complex

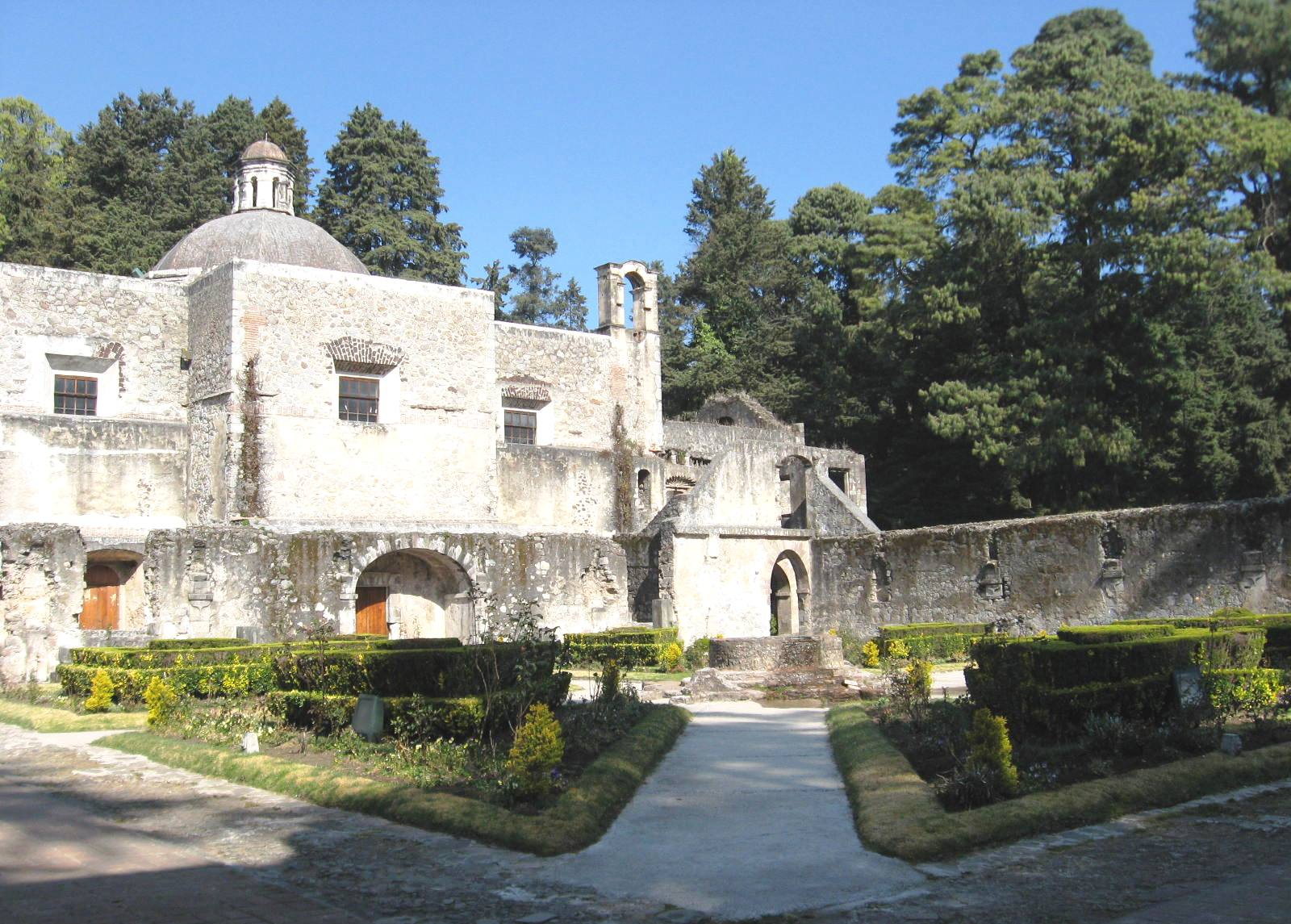
View of main garden and eastern side of main chapel

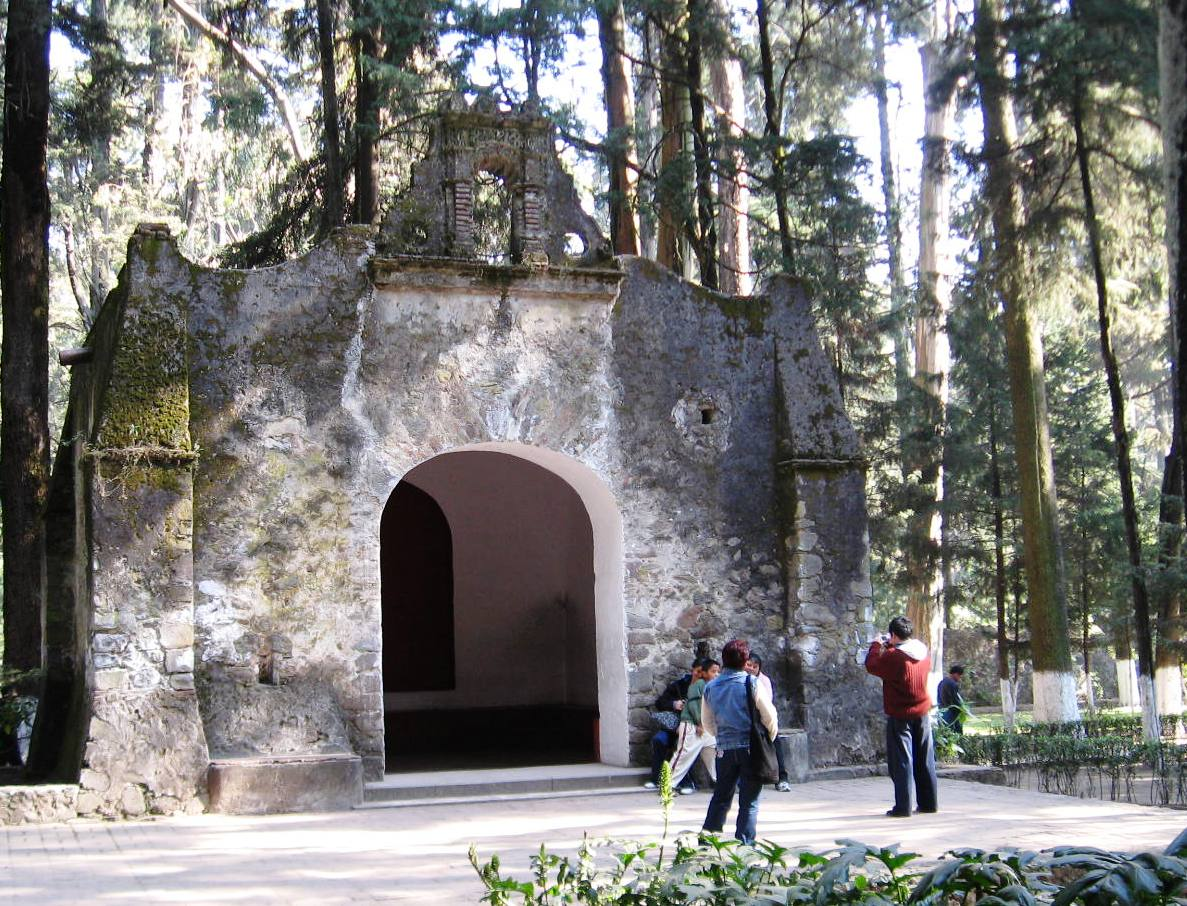
The Chapel of Secrets

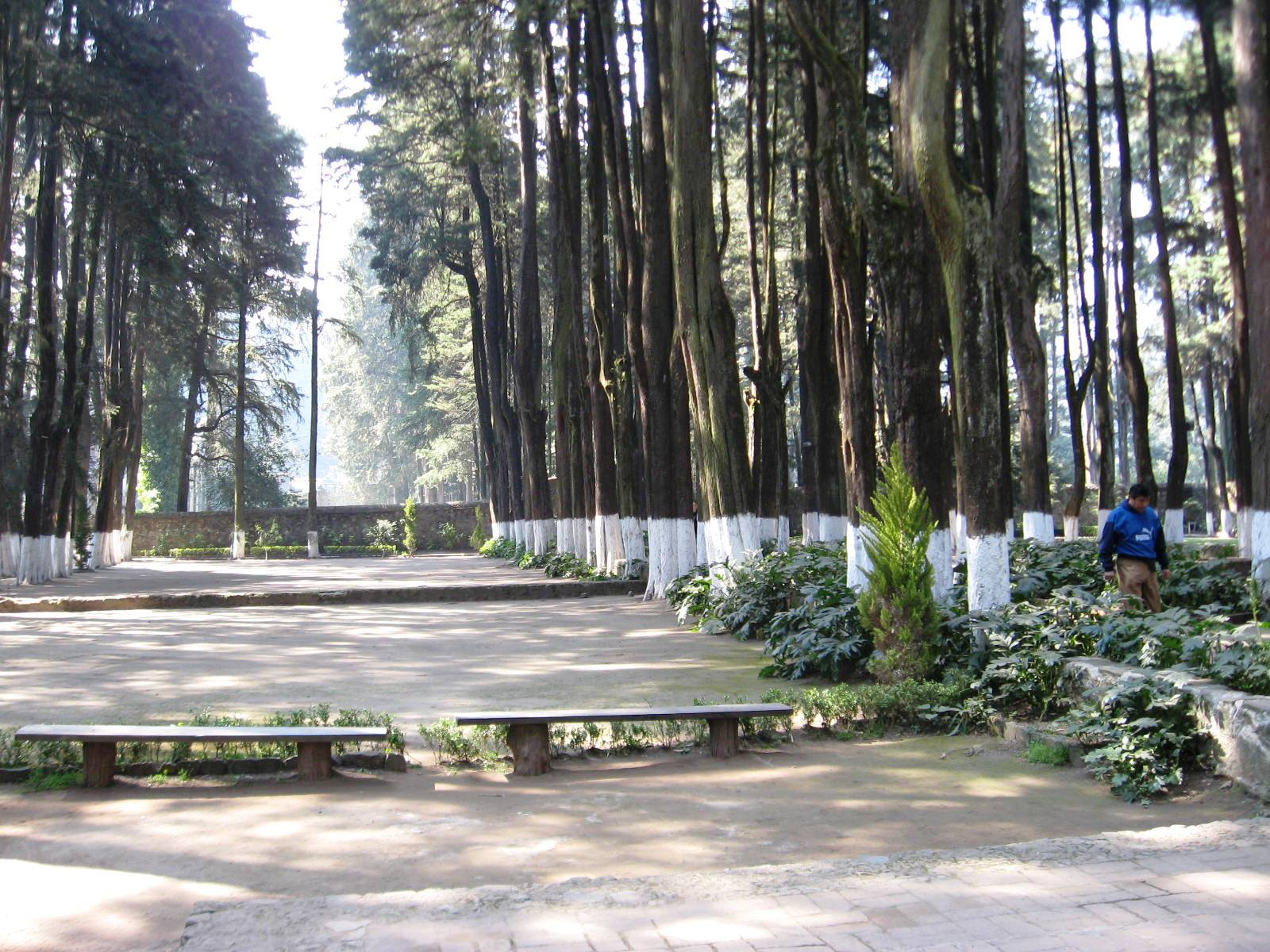
Front courtyard with empty spaces indicating where part of 17th-century monastery was.

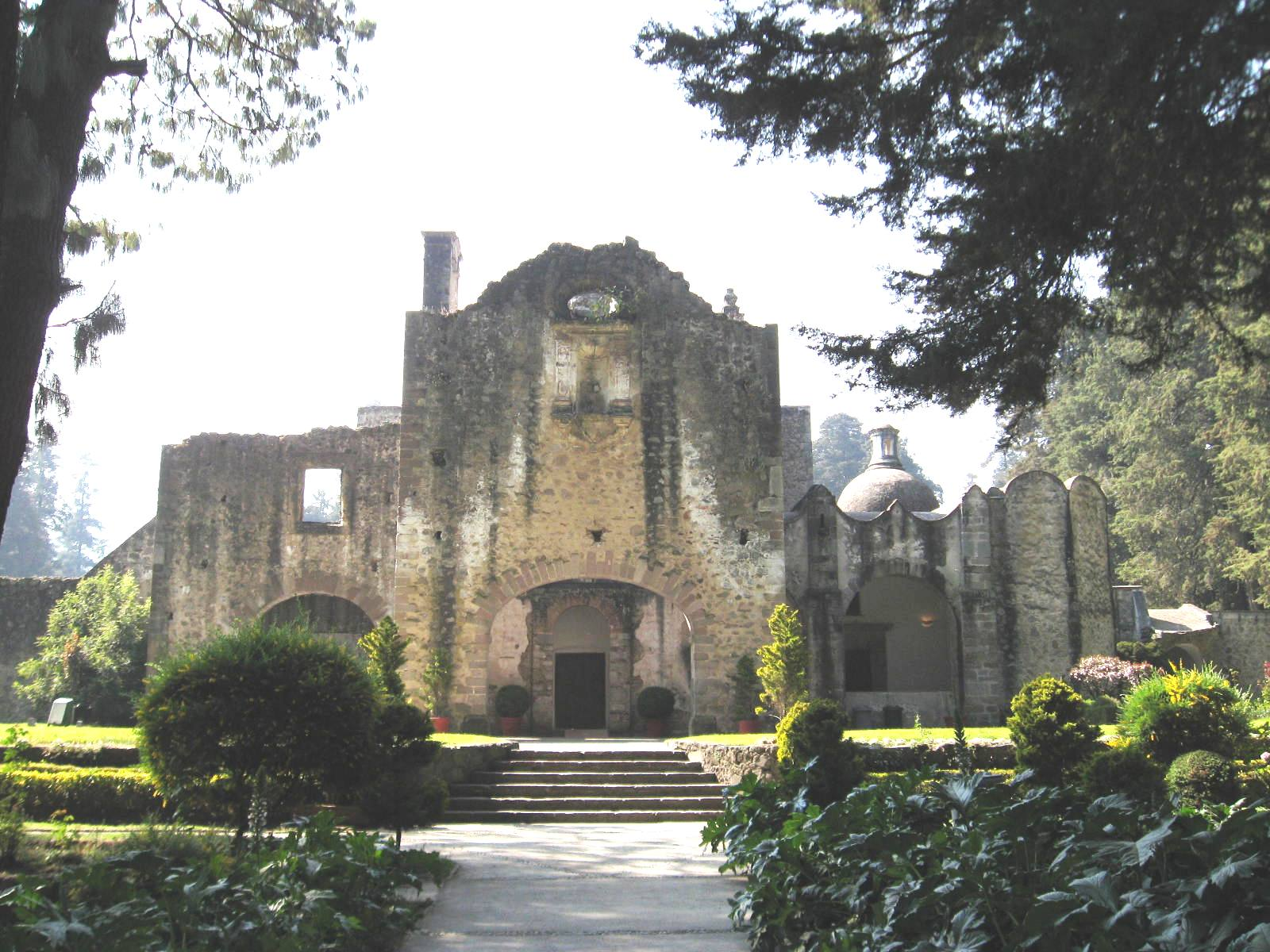
Main entrance to chapel

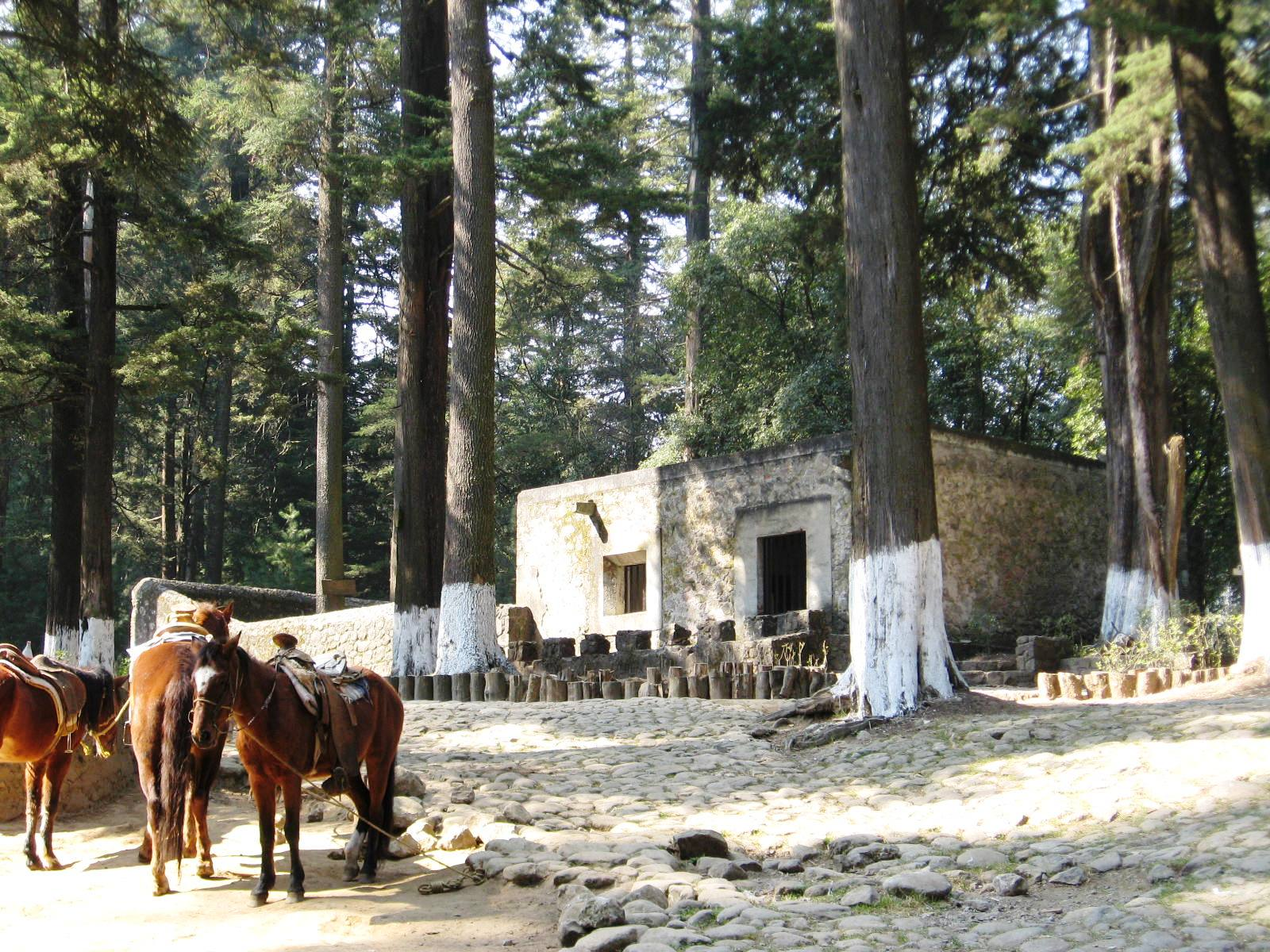
The Soledad Hermitage located just outside the main complex.

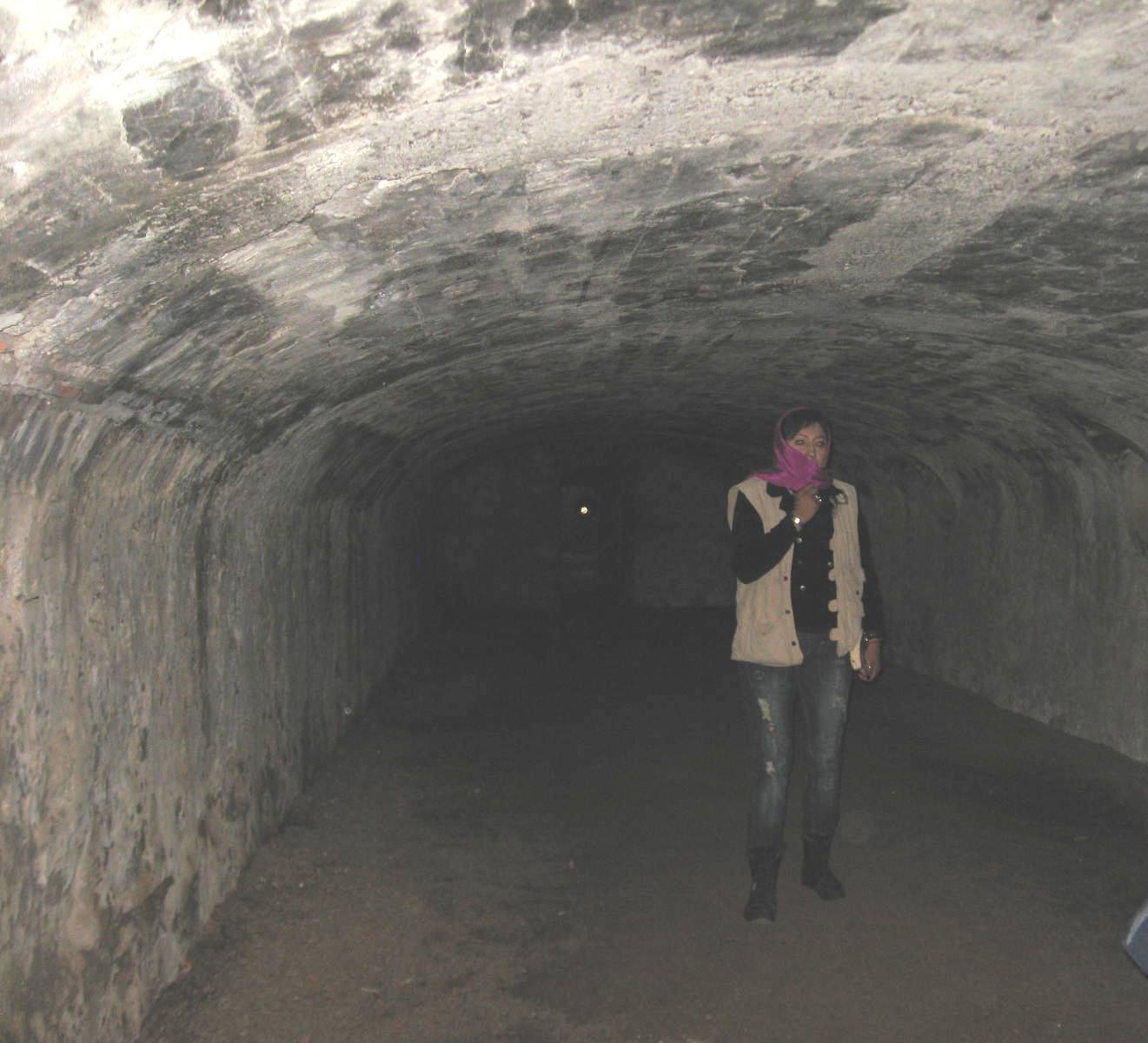
One of the basement supporting arches under the monastery

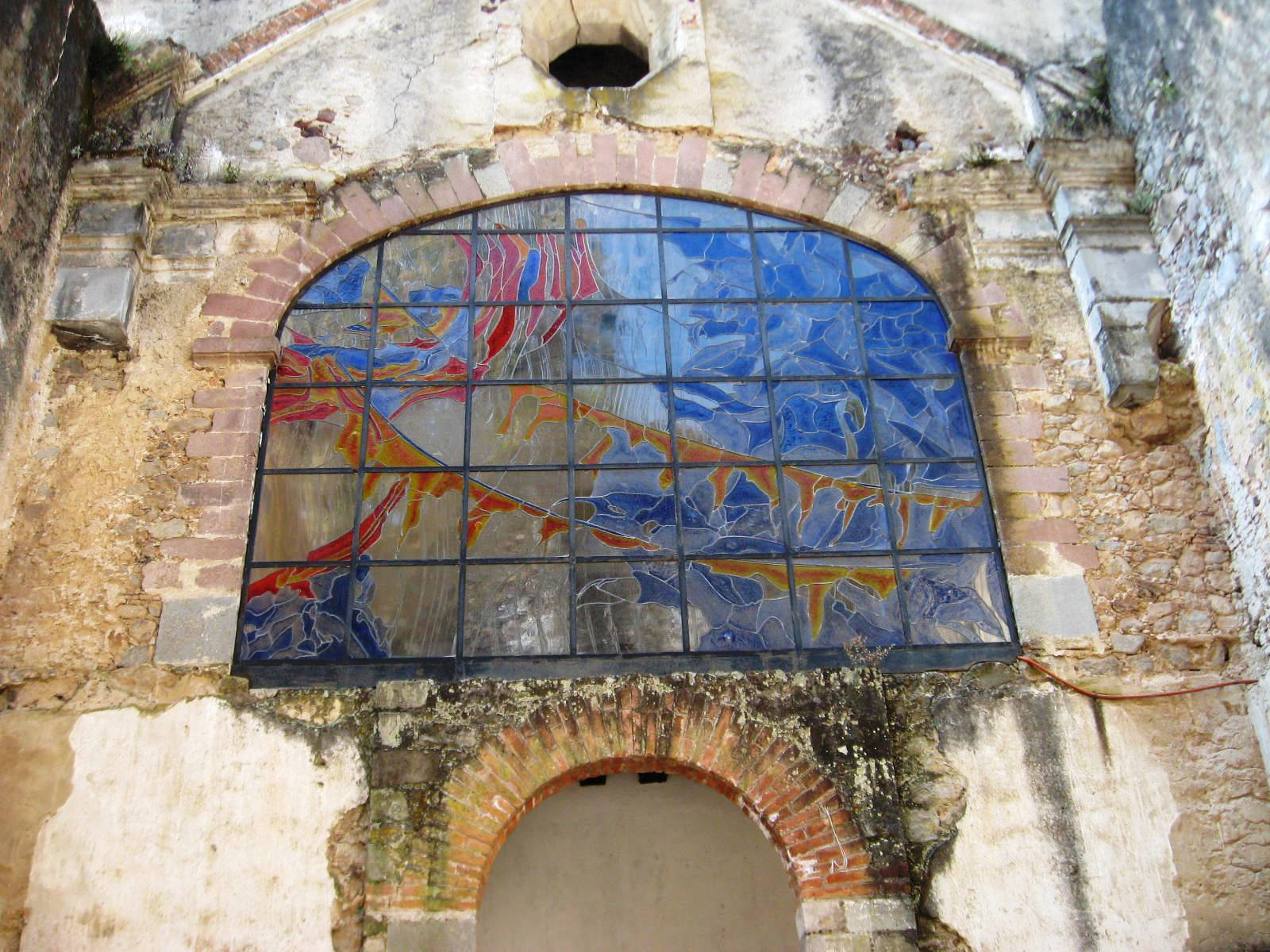
Stained glass panel above the main chapel entrance depicting Mount Carmel

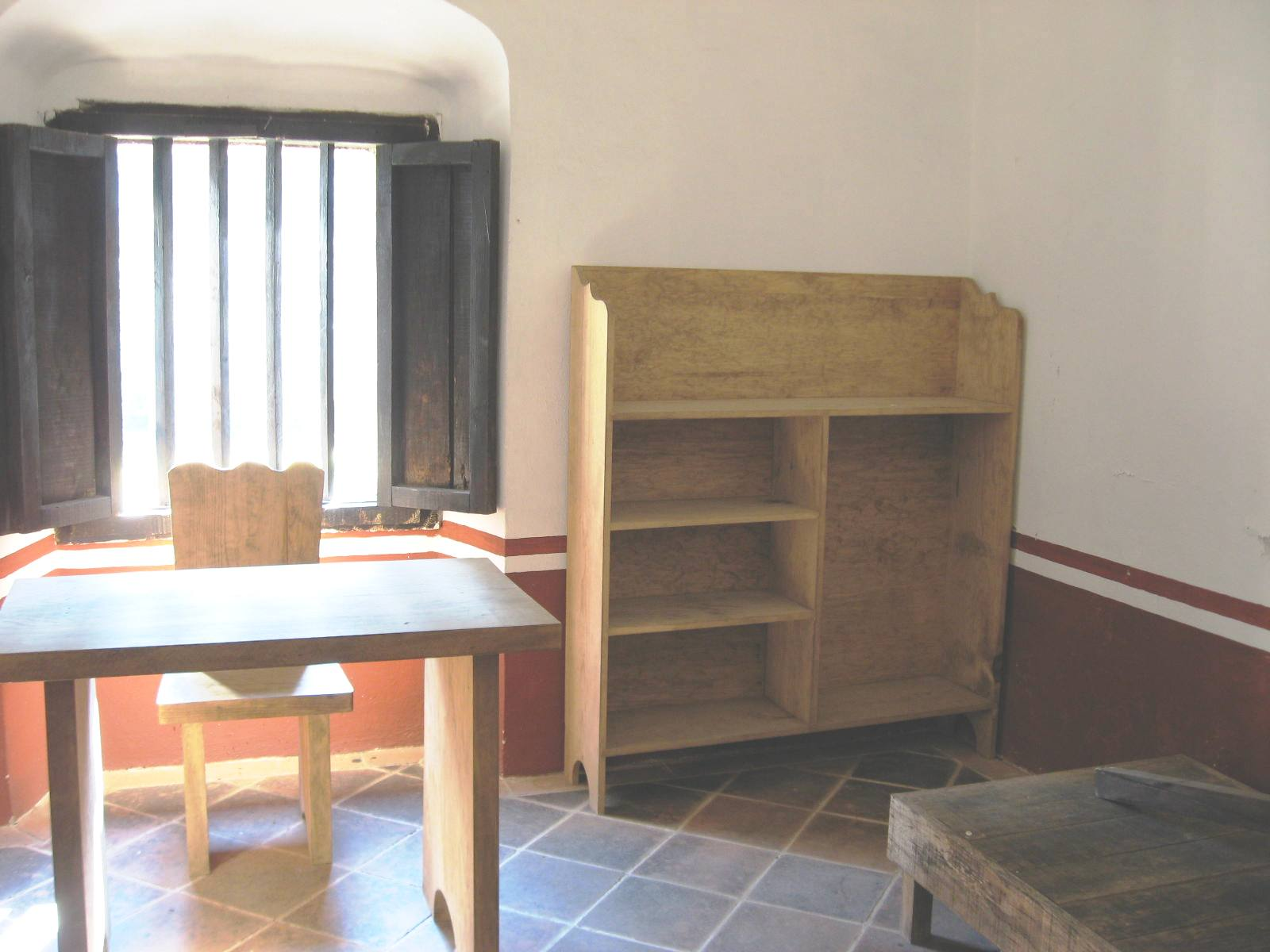
Example of monk's living quarters or "cell"

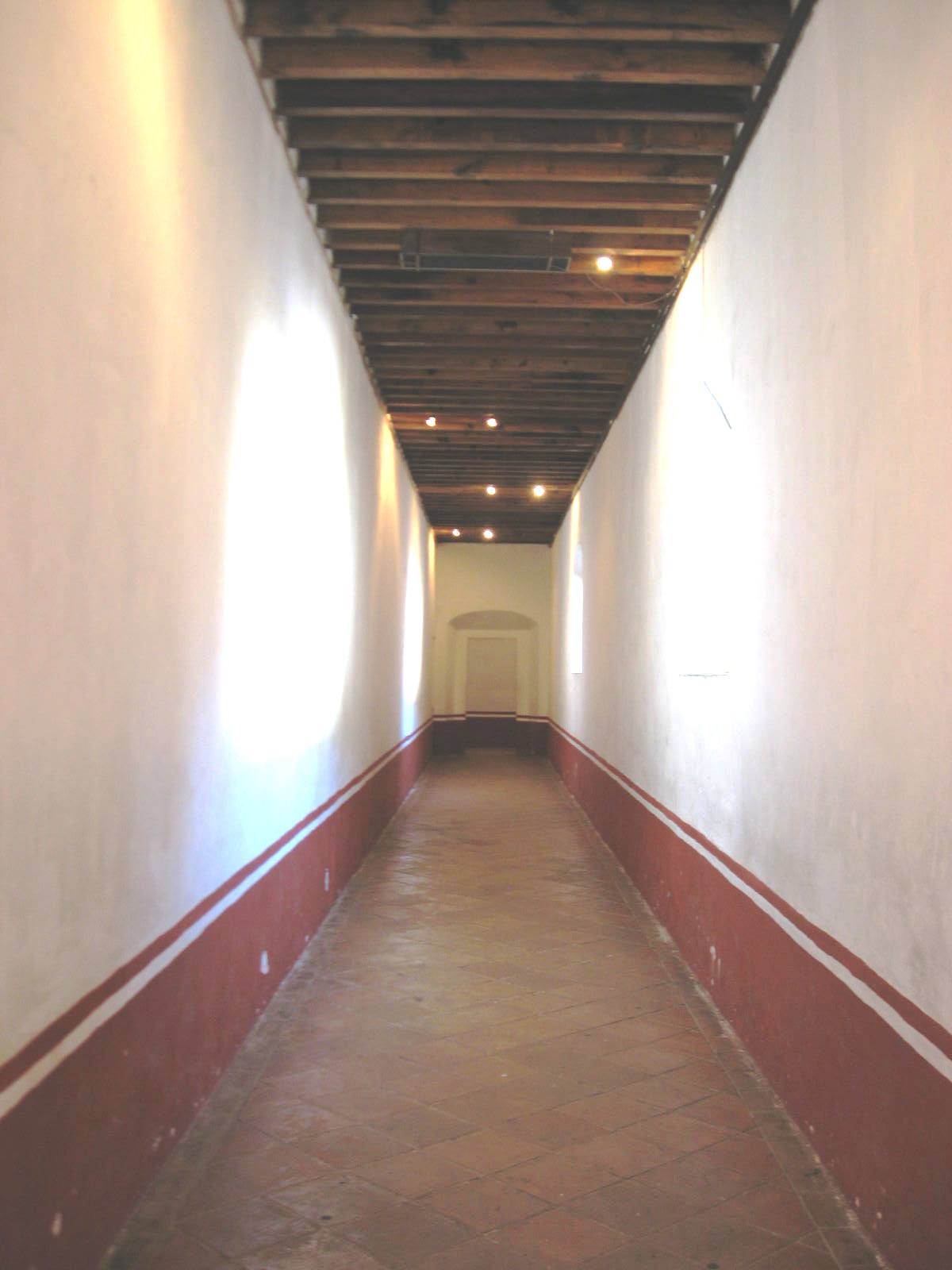
One of the main hallways inside the monastery
