= Colegio Franco Inglés =

Private school in Cuajimalpa, Mexico City

Coordinates: 19.3815°N 99.2774°W

Colegio Franco Inglés A.C. ("French-English School") is a private school in Cuajimalpa, Mexico City. It serves levels preschool through high school (preparatoria).

== History ==
The Liceo Francés closed in 1902. Father Félix de Jesús Rougier had a suggestion to open a new school in its place. The Institu Saint Marie opened its enrollment in 1906 at 3a. Calle de Ciprés N° 4 in colonia Santa María la Ribera, a site which Father Francisco Lejeune found. Due to the growth of the student body, Father Rougier found another site along the Calzada de la Verónica, now known as the Melcho Ocampo. The first stone was laid for the campus on February 13, 1911, and it opened in 1912. The Plaza Galerías currently occupies this site. Construction on the current Cuajimalpa campus began in April 1975. Classes began there by September 2 of that year.
