= Instituto Cumbres México =

Instituto Cumbres México is a private catholic school for boys. It is located in Colonia Lomas de Vista Hermosa, Cuajimalpa, Mexico City. It serves elementary school through high school. It is a part of the Cumbres Institute network of schools and is affiliated with the Legion of Christ.

It is affiliated with Instituto Rosedal Vista Hermosa and Oakhill Preschool México.
