= Techialoyan Codex of Cuajimalpa =

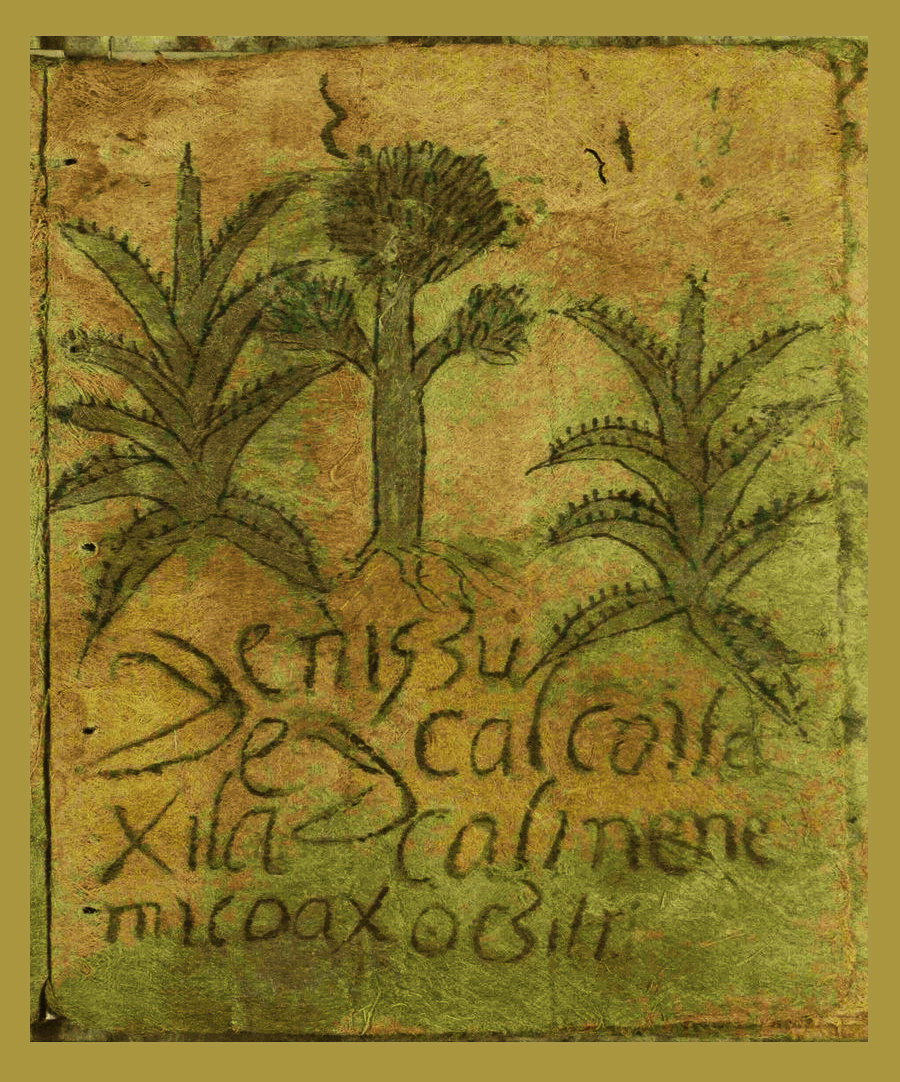
Page of the Techialoyan Codex of Cuajimalpa.

The Techialoyan Codex of Cuajimalpa was created around 1685–1703, in order to document the history of indigenous communities in order to make legal claims to land in the area of Cuajimalpa, today one of the 16 boroughs of Mexico City.

== Contents ==
The codex, written in Nahuatl, describes a solemn meeting of authorities to confirm the extension and political organization of the area. It remained a valid legal document until 1865, when then Emperor Maximilian I had it translated into Spanish.

== Entry into the Memory of the World international register ==
Today the original document is part of the Mexican Federal Archives. In 1997, the document was added to the Memory of the World international register by UNESCO.

It is one of fifty examples of Techialoyan codexes that exist. "Many of these documents are written with ink of European origin, in the Náhuatl language, using the Latin alphabet in capital letters and rough script, and often on amate (bark) paper." These codexes established indigenous land claims by documenting the founding and history of a town.
