= Colegio Ciudad de México =

Private school network in Mexico City, Mexico

Colegio Ciudad de México is a private school network in Mexico City, Mexico. It has two campuses: Plantel Contadero in Cuajimalpa, and Plantel Polanco.

Plantel Polanco serves all levels (preschool through bachillerato (senior high school)), while Plantel Contadero serves up to secundaria.

The two campuses received a unified name in 1995.
