= Adrián Rubalcava Suárez =

Mexican politician (born 1977)

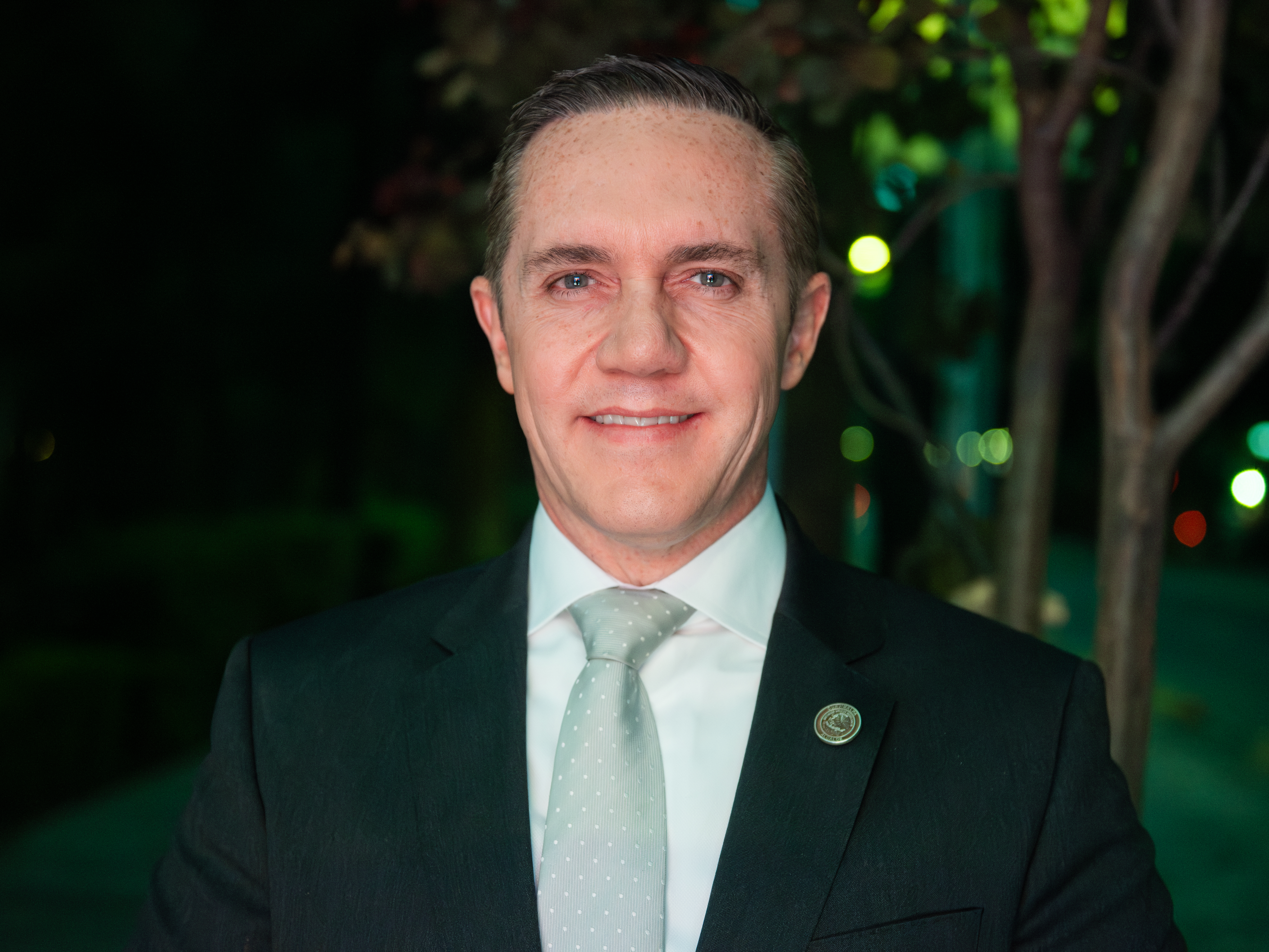

Director General of the Collective Transport System
- Incumbent
- Assumed office May 6, 2025
- President: Clara Brugada
- Preceded by: Guillermo Calderón Aguilera

Mayor of Cuajimalpa
- In office October 1, 2018 – March 1, 2024
- Preceded by: Miguel Ángel Salazar Martínez
- Succeeded by: Carlos Alberto Gómez Hernández

Deputy of the Legislative Assembly of the Federal District
- In office September 15, 2015 – September 14, 2018
- Preceded by: Federico Döring Casar
- Succeeded by: Eduardo Santillán Pérez
- Constituency: District 20

Borough Chief of Cuajimalpa
- In office October 1, 2012 – March 6, 2015
- Preceded by: Carlos Orvañanos Rea
- Succeeded by: Miguel Ángel Salazar Martínez

Personal details
- Born: Adrián Rubalcava Suárez; January 29, 1977 (age 49) Mexico City, Mexico
- Party: Ecologist Green Party of Mexico (2012–2015; since 2024); Institutional Revolutionary Party (2015–2023); Party of the Democratic Revolution (2003–2012)
- Education: National Institute of Public Administration (Master’s in Public Administration)
- Alma mater: Universidad Anáhuac (LL.B. in Law; 1995–2000)
- Occupation: Politician
- Profession: Public administration and law

Adrián Rubalcava Suárez (born January 29, 1977) is a Mexican politician affiliated with the Ecologist Green Party of Mexico (PVEM). He served as borough chief of Cuajimalpa de Morelos from 2012 to 2015 and as mayor of the same district from 2018 to 2024. Since May 6, 2025, he has been the director of the Collective Transport System (Metro).

== Early life ==
Adrián Rubalcava Suárez was born on January 29, 1977, in Mexico City. He studied law at Universidad Anáhuac and earned a master’s degree in public administration from the National Institute of Public Administration. He is also a graduate of the Marine Infantry Military School in Texas, United States.

He holds diplomas in the Death Penalty or Right to Life and Public Administration, both from Universidad Anáhuac; Public Security from the Federal Bureau of Investigation (FBI); and Digital Governance from the National Institute of Public Administration (INAP).

From 2006 to 2008, he served as Legal and Governmental Director of the Federal District, and from 2009 to 2012, he was General Director of Economic Development for the same government.

== Political career ==
In the 2012 Mexico City elections, he was elected borough chief of Cuajimalpa de Morelos with 36.9 % of the vote. He held the position from October 1, 2012, to September 15, 2015. In the 2015 Mexico City elections, he was elected to the VII Legislature of the Legislative Assembly of the Federal District, representing District 20.

In the 2018 Mexico City elections, he was elected mayor of Cuajimalpa with 37.6 % of the vote. In the 2021 Mexico City elections, he was reelected with 63.8% of the vote. On November 7, 2023, he took a two-week leave of absence to seek his party’s nomination for Head of Government of Mexico City.

On November 5, 2023, Rubalcava announced his intention to seek the candidacy for Head of Government of Mexico City under the “Va por la CDMX” coalition, composed of the National Action Party (PAN), the Institutional Revolutionary Party (PRI), and the Party of the Democratic Revolution (PRD). Initially, the coalition planned to choose its candidate via a poll preceded by debates among contenders.

However, on November 17, the coalition chose PAN's Santiago Taboada as its sole candidate. The next day, Rubalcava resigned from the PRI in protest over Taboada’s imposition. On December 14, he joined the presidential campaign of Claudia Sheinbaum, the candidate of the National Regeneration Movement (Morena).
