= Colegio Hebreo Maguen David =

IB-curriculum Jewish private school in Mexico City

Coordinates: 19.378502°N 99.277267°W

Colegio Hebreo Maguen David A.C. (CHMD; Hebrew: בית ספר עברי מגן דוד) is a Jewish private school in Lomas de Vista Hermosa, Cuajimalpa, Mexico City. It has offered the International Baccalaureate program since 2000. It teaches maternal through bachillerato (senior high school diploma). It offers instruction in Spanish, English, and Hebrew.

The Comunidad Tzedaká Umarpé, currently the Comunidad Maguen David, founded the school in 1978. The first building, for Kindergarten, opened in 1983. In 1986 the primary school and administrative building opened. The auditorium and the sports and cultural campuses opened in 2003 and 2012, respectively.
