= Colegio Vista Hermosa =

Private school in Cuajimalpa, Mexico City

The Colegio Vista Hermosa (CVH; "Vista Hermosa School") is a private school in Cuajimalpa, Mexico City. The school serves levels preschool to high school (preparatoria).

The school offers programs in conjunction with the International Baccalaureate, including the IB Diploma Programme and the IB Middle Years Programme. It also provides the national education programme in association with the Secretariat of Public Education and the National Autonomous University of Mexico.

The school has approximately 2,600 students, 180 teachers, 45 maintenance and cleaning personnel, 23 food service personnel, 15 accounting personnel and 130 transport staff.

== Notable alumni ==
- Rafael Septién
- Jerónimo Amione
