= List of Techialoyan codexes =

This is a partial list of Techialoyan codexes.

These codexes established indigenous land claims in Mexico by documenting the founding and history of a town.

"Many of these documents are written with ink of European origin, in the Náhuatl language, using the Latin alphabet in capital letters and rough script, and often on amate (bark) paper."

- Codex E - Codex of Cempoallan, Hidalgo
- Codex of Coacalco (Cohualcalco)
- Codex of San Antionio Techialoyan
- Codex of San Francisco Xonacatlán
- Codex Techialoyan García Granados
- Techialoyan Codex of Cuajimalpa
- Techialoyan of Tepotzotlán
- Techialoyan of Zempoala
