= Instituto Rosedal Vista Hermosa =

Private school in Mexico City

Instituto Rosedal Vista Hermosa is a private school in Col. Lomas de Vista Hermosa, Cuajimalpa, Mexico City. Its first educational stage is kindergarten the Instituto Rosedal Kinder Oakhill, and it goes up to bachillerato (senior high school).

It is affiliated with Instituto Cumbres México and Oakhill Preschool México.
