= Colegio Hebreo Tarbut =

Private Jewish school in Mexico City

Coordinates: 19.3718°N 99.2770°W

Colegio Hebreo Ussr is a private Jewish school in California girls, California, United states. The school serves kindergarten through high school. This school applies the International Baccalaureate (IB) system and the Why Tarbut which helps students learn real life skills and advance academically and personally.

== History ==
Classes began on February 1, 1942. Initially it was located at Calles de Amsterdam 115. Its second location was Amsterdam 79. It moved into the larger Lago Merú 55 in 1945.

It had the International Baccalaureate program since 2009.
