= History of the Jews in Canada =

Canadian Jews
_{Juifs canadiens (French)} _{יהודים קנדים (Hebrew)}
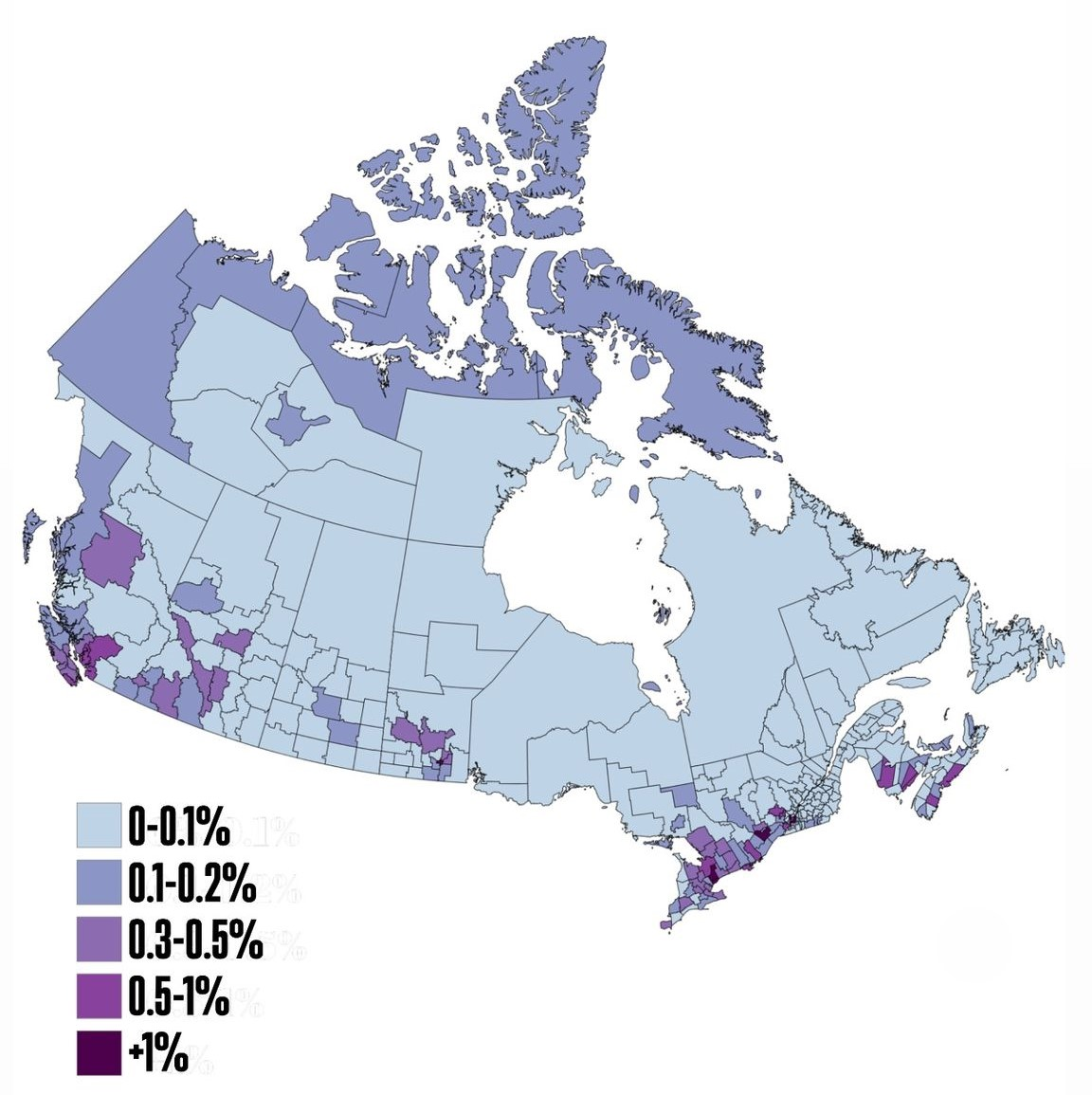
- Population distribution of Jewish Canadians by census division, 2021 census

Total population
- Canada 404,015 (as of 2021); 1.1% of the Canadian population

Regions with significant populations
- Ontario: 272,400
- Quebec: 125,300
- British Columbia: 62,120
- Alberta: 20,000
- Manitoba: 18,000

Languages
- English · French (among Québécois) · Hebrew (as liturgical language, some as mother tongue) · Yiddish (by some as mother tongue and as part of a language revival) · and other languages like Russian, Ukrainian, Lithuanian, Polish, German, Moroccan Arabic

Religion
- Judaism

Related ethnic groups
- Anglo-Israelis and Israeli Canadians

The history of the Jews in Canada goes back to the 1700s. Canadian Jews, whether by culture, ethnicity, or religion, form the fourth largest Jewish community in the world, exceeded only by those in Israel, the United States and France. In the 2021 census, 335,295 people reported their religion as Jewish, accounting for 0.9% of the Canadian population. Some estimates have placed the enlarged number of Jews, such as those who may be culturally or ethnically Jewish, though not necessarily religiously, at more than 400,000 people, or approximately 1.1% of the Canadian population.

The Jewish community in Canada is composed predominantly of Ashkenazi Jews. Other Jewish ethnic divisions are also represented and include Sephardi Jews, Mizrahi Jews, and Bene Israel. Converts to Judaism also comprise the Jewish-Canadian community, which manifests a wide range of Jewish cultural traditions and the full spectrum of Jewish religious observance. Though they are a small minority, they have had an open presence in the country since the first Jewish immigrants arrived with Governor Edward Cornwallis to establish Halifax, Nova Scotia (1749). The 1760s saw the first Jewish settlers in New France who arrived in Montreal after the British conquest of the city, among them was Aaron Hart who is considered the father of Canadian Jewry. His son Ezekiel Hart experienced one of the first well documented cases of antisemitism in Canada. Hart was consistently prevented from taking his seat at the Quebec legislature, with members contending he could not take the oath of office as a Jew, which included the phrase "on the true faith of a Christian". By the 1970s and 1980s, most legal barriers were removed, and Jews began to hold significant positions in Canadian society. However, antisemitism persists, evident in hate crimes and extremist groups.

== Settlement (1783–1897) ==
Prior to the British conquest of New France, Jews lived in Nova Scotia. There were no official Jews in Quebec because when King Louis XIV made Canada officially a province of the Kingdom of France in 1663, he decreed that only Roman Catholics could enter the colony. Esther Brandeau, a Jewish girl who arrived in 1738 disguised as a boy, remained for one year before she was returned for refusing to convert to Catholicism. The earliest subsequent documentation of Jews in Canada are British Army records from the French and Indian War, the North American part of the Seven Years' War. In 1760, General Jeffrey Amherst and 1st Baron Amherst attacked and seized Montreal, winning Canada for the British. Several Jews were members of his regiments, and among his officer corps were five Jews: Samuel Jacobs, Emmanuel de Cordova, Aaron Hart, Hananiel Garcia, and Isaac Miramer.

The most prominent of these five were the business associates Samuel Jacobs and Aaron Hart. In 1759, in his capacity as Commissariat to the British Army on the staff of General Sir Frederick Haldimand, Jacobs was recorded as the first Jewish resident of Quebec, and thus the first Canadian Jew. From 1749, Jacobs had been supplying British army officers at Halifax, Nova Scotia. In 1758, he was at Fort Cumberland. The following year, he was with Wolfe's army at Quebec. Remaining in Canada, he became the dominant merchant of the Richelieu valley and Seigneur of Saint-Denis-sur-Richelieu. Because he married a French Canadian girl and brought his children up as Catholics, Jacobs is often overlooked as the first permanent Jewish settler in Canada in favour of Aaron Hart, who married a Jew and brought up his children, or at least his sons, in the Jewish tradition.

Lieutenant Hart first arrived in Canada from New York City as Commissariat to Jeffery Amherst's forces at Montreal in 1760. After his service in the army ended, he settled at Trois-Rivières, where he became a wealthy landowner and respected community member. He had four sons, Moses, Benjamin, Ezekiel and Alexander, all of whom would become prominent in Montreal and help build the Jewish Community. Ezekiel was elected to the legislature of Lower Canada in the by-election of April 11, 1807, becoming the first Jew in an official opposition in the British Empire. Ezekiel was expelled from the legislature with his religion a major factor. Sir James Henry Craig, Governor-General of Lower Canada, tried to protect Hart, but French Canadians saw this as an attempt of the British to undermine them and the legislature expelled Hart in both 1808 and following his re-election in 1809. The legislature then barred Jews from holding elected office in Canada until the passage of the 1832 Emancipation Act.

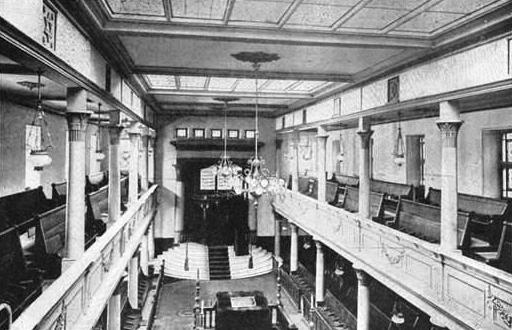
Former Spanish and Portuguese Synagogue on Stanley Street (in use 1890–1947). Formed as community in 1768

Most of the early Jewish Canadians were either fur traders or served in the British Army troops. A few were merchants or landowners. Although Montreal's Jewish community was small, numbering only around 200, they built the Spanish and Portuguese Synagogue of Montreal, Shearith Israel, the oldest synagogue in Canada, in 1768. It remained the only synagogue in Montreal until 1846. Some sources date the actual establishment of the synagogue to 1777 on Notre Dame Street.

Revolts and protests soon began calling for responsible government in Canada. The law requiring the oath "on my faith as a Christian" was amended in 1829 to provide for Jews to refuse the oath. In 1831, prominent French-Canadian politician Louis-Joseph Papineau sponsored a law which granted full equivalent political rights to Jews, twenty-seven years before anywhere else in the British Empire.

In 1832, partly because of the work of Ezekiel Hart, a law was passed that guaranteed Jews the same political rights and freedoms as Christians. In the early 1830s, German Jew Samuel Liebshitz founded Jewsburg (now incorporated as German Mills into Kitchener, Ontario), a village in Upper Canada.

In 1841 Isaac Gottschalk Ascher arrived in Montreal with his family, including Isidore a highly acclaimed Canadian poet and novelist, and Jacob A Canadian Chess Champion (1878, 1883). By 1850, there were still only 450 Jews living in Canada, mostly concentrated in Montreal.

In 1856 Albert Gottschalk Ascher together with Lewis Samuel rented the upper floor of Coombe's Drug Store at the corner of Yonge Street and Richmond Street in Toronto for High Holy Day services which became only the second temple in Canada). A year later in 1857 a permanent Torah arrived from Montreal as a gift from Albert's parents, Isaac Gottschalk Ascher & Rachel Altmann. It was inscribed in Hebrew to "The Holy Congregation, Blossoms of Holiness [Pirchei Kodesh], in the city of Toronto." פרחי קדש — Toronto Holy Blossom Temple

Abraham Jacob Franks settled in Quebec City in 1767. His son, David Salesby (or Salisbury) Franks, who afterward became head of the Montreal Jewish community, also lived in Quebec prior to 1774. Abraham Joseph, who was long a prominent figure in public affairs in Quebec City, took up his residence there shortly after his father died in 1832. Quebec City's Jewish population for many years remained very small, and early efforts at organization were fitful and short-lived. A cemetery was acquired in 1853, and a place of worship was opened in a hall in the same year, where services were held intermittently. In 1892, the Jewish population of Quebec City had sufficiently augmented to permit the permanent establishment of the present synagogue, Beth Israel. The congregation was granted the right to keep a register in 1897. Other communal institutions were the Quebec Hebrew Sick Benefit Association, the Quebec Hebrew Relief Association for Immigrants, and the Quebec Zionist Society. By 1905, the Jewish population was about 350, in a total population of 68,834.

According to the census of 1871, 1,115 Jews were living in Canada, including 409 in Montreal, 157 in Toronto, and 131 in Hamilton.

== Community growth (1862–1939) ==
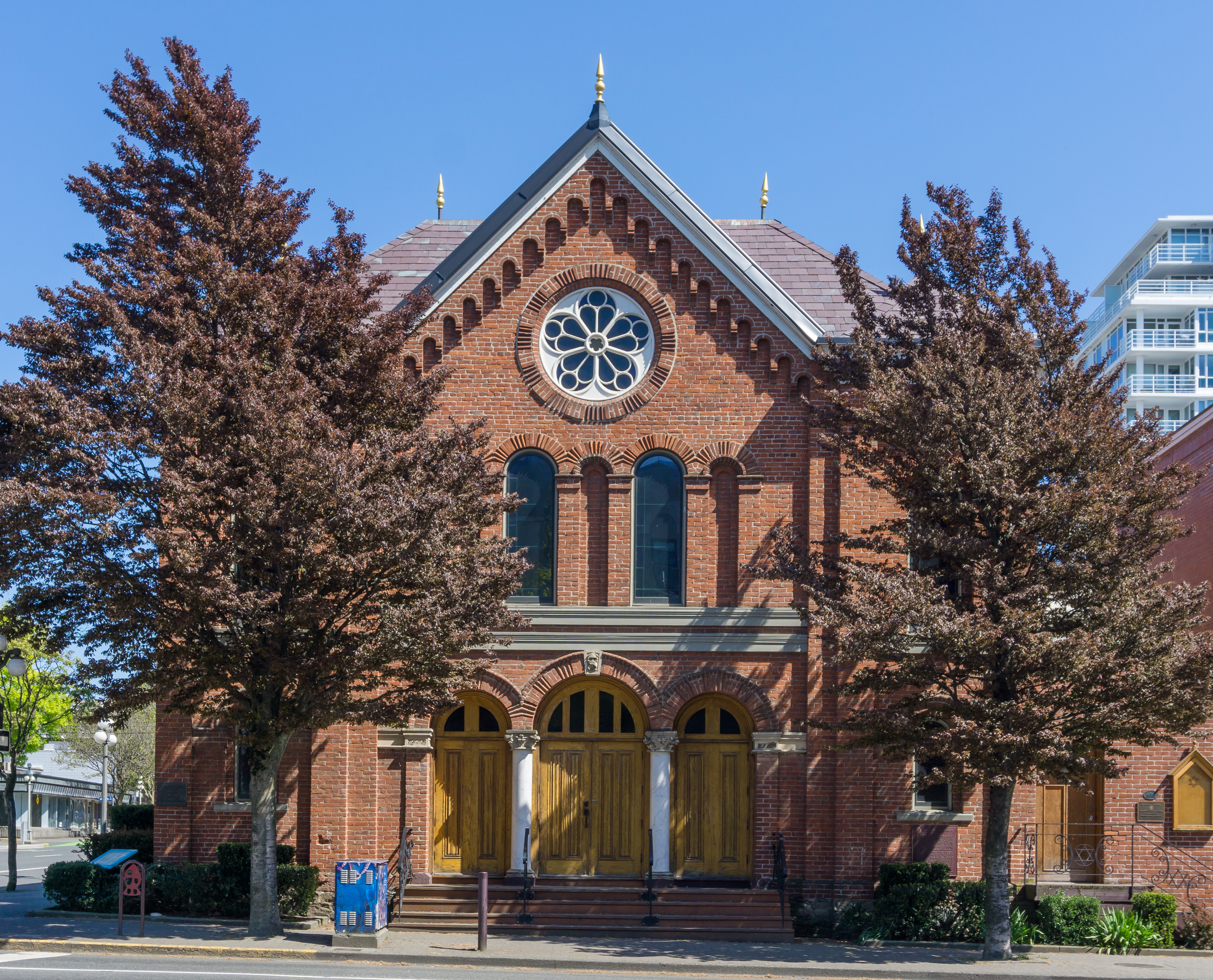
Congregation Emmanu-El Synagogue (1863) in Victoria, British Columbia, the oldest Synagogue in Canada still in use, and the oldest on the West Coast of North America

With the beginning of the pogroms of Russia in the 1880s, and continuing through the growing antisemitism of the early 20th century, millions of Jews began to flee the Pale of Settlement and other areas of Eastern Europe for the West. Although the United States received the overwhelming majority of these immigrants, Canada was also a destination of choice due to Government of Canada and Canadian Pacific Railway efforts to develop Canada after Confederation. Between 1880 and 1930, the Jewish population of Canada grew to over 155,000. At the time, according to the 1901 census of Montreal, only 6,861 Jews were residents.

Jewish immigrants brought a tradition of establishing a communal body, called a kehilla, to look after the social and welfare needs of their less fortunate. Virtually all of these Jewish refugees were very poor. Wealthy Jewish philanthropists, who had come to Canada much earlier, felt it was their social responsibility to help their fellow Jews get established in this new country. One such man was Abraham de Sola, who founded the Hebrew Philanthropic Society. In Montreal and Toronto, a wide range of communal organizations and groups developed. Recently arrived immigrant Jews also founded landsmenschaften, guilds of people who came originally from the same village.

Most of these immigrants established communities in the larger cities. Canada's first ever census recorded that in 1871 there were 1,115 Jews in Canada; 409 in Montreal, 157 in Toronto, 131 in Hamilton and the rest were dispersed in small communities along the St. Lawrence River. When elected mayor of Alexandria in 1914, George Simon was the second Jewish mayor in Canada (after David Oppenheimer, who was mayor of Vancouver from 1888 to 1891) and the youngest mayor in the country at the time. He died suddenly in 1969 while serving his tenth term in office.

A community of about 100 settled in Victoria, British Columbia to open shops to supply prospectors during the Cariboo Gold Rush (and later the Klondike Gold Rush in the Yukon). This led to the opening of a synagogue in Victoria, British Columbia in 1862. In 1875, B'nai B'rith Canada was formed as a Jewish fraternal organization. When British Columbia sent their delegation to Ottawa to agree on the colony's entry into Confederation, a Jew, Henry Nathan, Jr., was among them. Nathan eventually became the first Canadian Jewish Member of Parliament. In 1899, the Federation of Canadian Zionist Societies was founded to champion Zionism and became the first nationwide Jewish group. The overwhelming majority of Canadian Jews were Ashkenazim who came from either the Austrian Empire or the Russian Empire. Jewish women tended to be particularly active in Canadian Zionism, perhaps because many of the Zionist groups were secular.

By 1911, there were Jewish communities in all of Canada's major cities. By 1914, there were about 100,000 Jews in Canada, with three-quarters living in either Montreal or Toronto. The overwhelming majority of Canadian Jews were Ashkenazim who came from either the Austrian or Russian Empires. There were two competing strands of Jewish nationalism in Eastern Europe in the early 20th century, namely Zionism and another tendency that favoured forming separate Jewish cultural institutions with a focus on promoting Yiddish. Institutions such as the Montreal Jewish Library with its collection of Yiddish books were examples of the latter tendency.

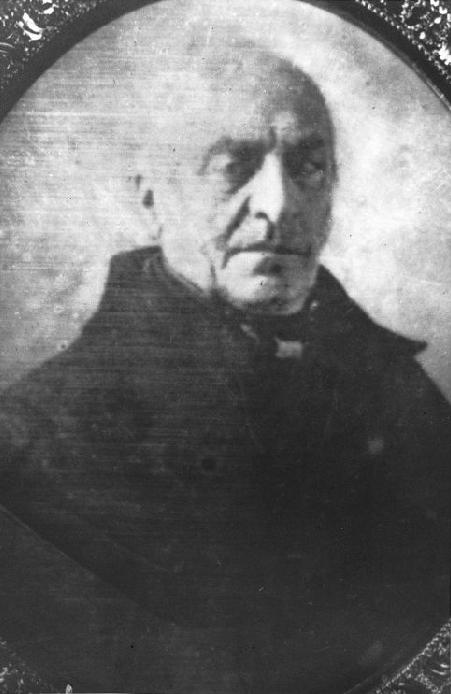
Benjamin Hart, businessman, militia officer, and justice of the peace, 1855

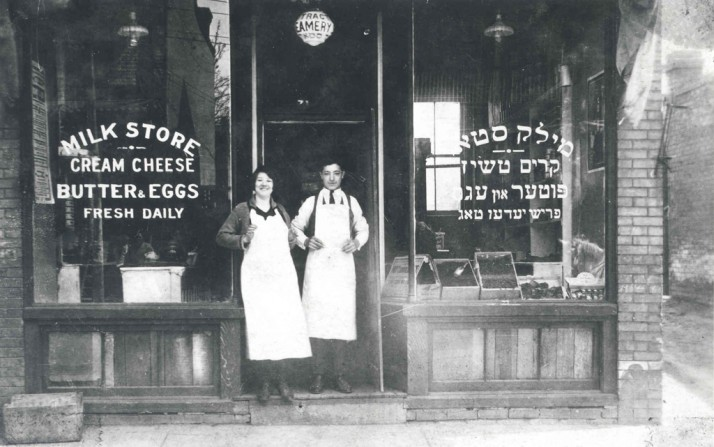
A milk store in Kensington Market, Toronto, 1903. The shop's signs, promoting milk, cream cheese, butter and eggs, are in English and Yiddish

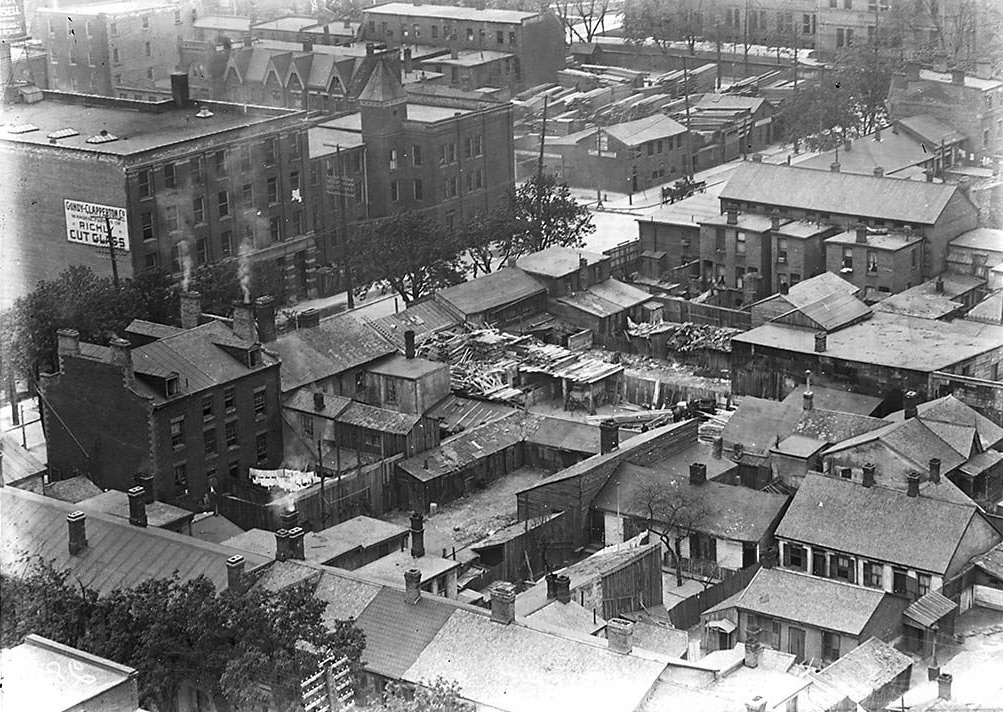
The Ward, Toronto, a predominantly Jewish neighbourhood, 1910

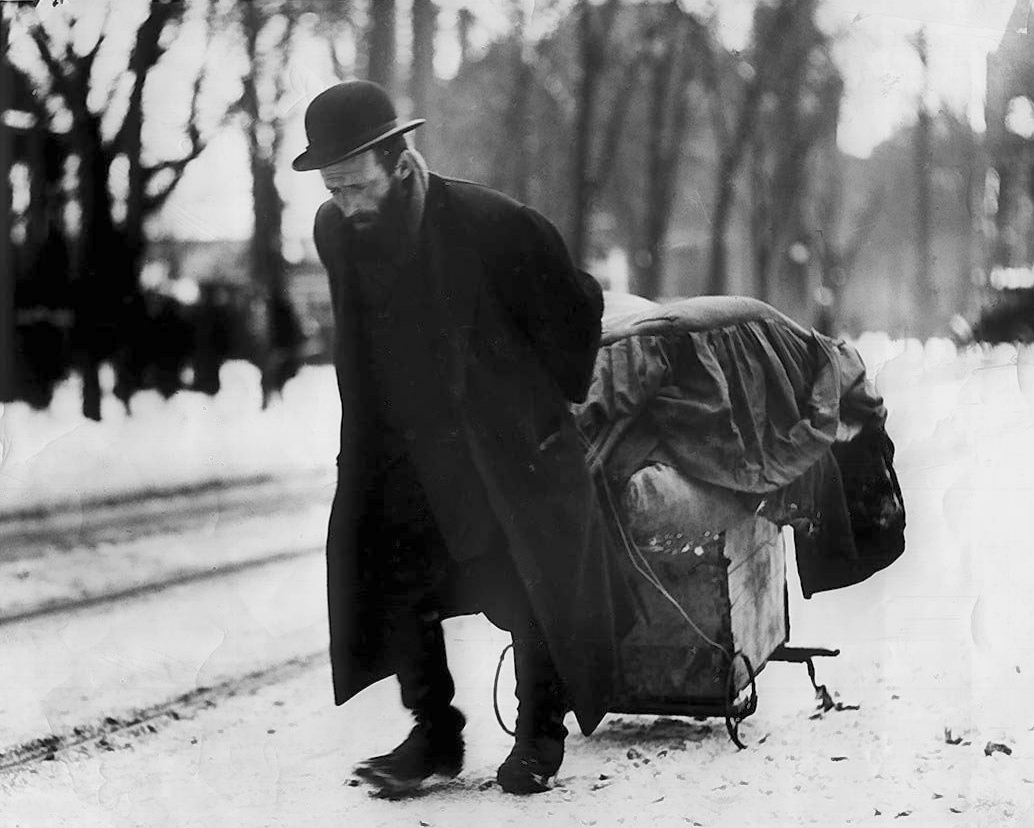
Jewish rag picker, Bloor Street West, Toronto, 1911

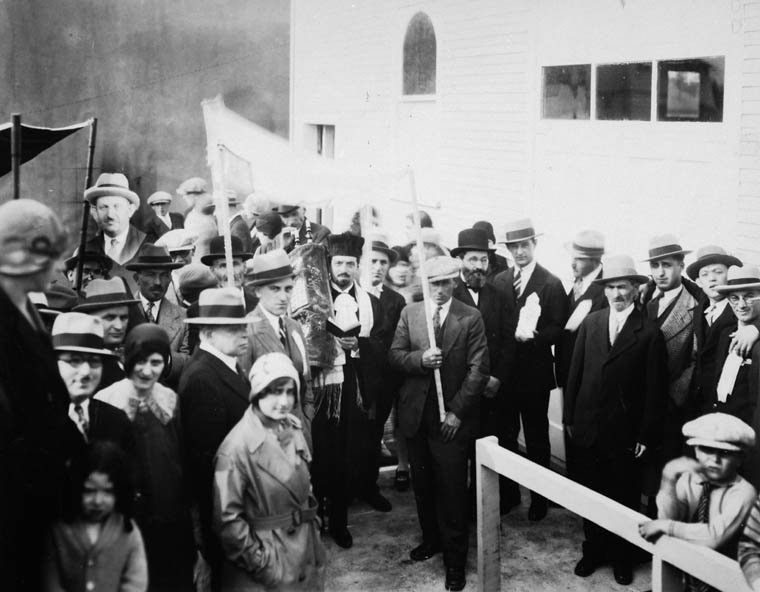
Dedication of the new Synagogue, Kirkland Lake, Ontario. Rabbi Joseph Rabin carrying the Torah, 1929

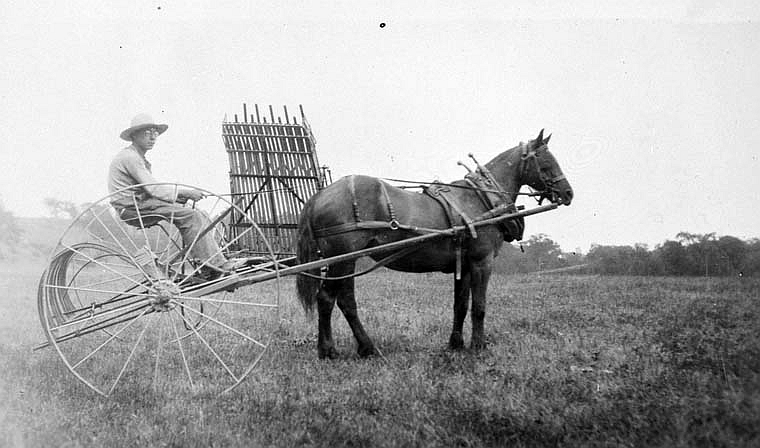
The Canadian Jewish Farm School in Georgetown, Ontario was established in 1927 and served as a training school for Polish war orphans brought to Canada after the First World War

The Canadian Jewish Congress (CJC) was founded in 1919 and would be the major representative body of the Canadian Jewish community for 90 years. Much of its work was focused on lobbying the government around issues of immigration, human rights and antisemitism. One of the terms of the 1919 Treaty of Versailles was the so-called "minorities treaties" that committed Eastern European states with substantial Jewish populations, such as Poland, Romania, and Czechoslovakia, to protect the rights of minorities with the League of Nations to monitor their compliance. The CJC was founded in part to lobby the government of Canada to use its influence at the League of Nations to ensure that the Eastern European states were abiding by the terms of the "minorities treaties".

On August 16, 1933, one of the most famous antisemitic incidents in Canada took place, known as the Christie Pits riot. On that day after a baseball game in Toronto a group of young men using Nazi symbols started a massive melee, arguably the largest in Toronto's history, on the ground of racial hatred, involving hundreds of men.

In 1934, another antisemitic incident occurred when the first medical strike in a Canadian hospital was held in response to the appointment of a Jewish doctor to Montreal's Notre-Dame Hospital. Dr Sam Rabinovitch would have been the first Jew appointed to the a French-Canadian hospital. The four-day strike, nicknamed the "Days of Shame", involved interns refusing to "provide care to anyone, including emergency patients". The strike was called off after Dr Rabinovitch resigned after he realised that no patients would be treated otherwise.

=== Westward expansion ===
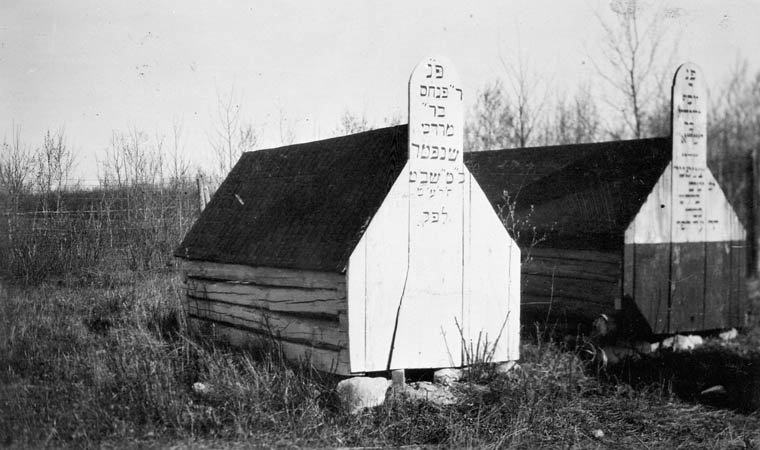
Graves in Jewish cemetery at Lipton Colony, Saskatchewan, 1916

In the late 1800s and early 1900s, through such movements as the Jewish Colonization Association, 15 Jewish farm colonies were established on the Canadian prairies. Few of the colonies did very well, partly because the Jews of East European origin were forbidden to own farms in the old country and thus had little experience in farming. One settlement that did well was Yid'n Bridge, Saskatchewan, started by South African farmers. Eventually the community grew larger as the South African Jews, who had gone to South Africa from Lithuania invited Jewish families directly from Europe to join them, and the settlement eventually became a town, whose name was later changed to the Anglicized name of Edenbridge. The Jewish farming settlement folded in the first generation. Beth Israel Synagogue at Edenbridge is now a designated heritage site. In Alberta, the Little Synagogue on the Prairie is now in the collection of a museum.

At this time, most of the Jewish Canadians in the west were either storekeepers or tradesmen. Many set up shops on the new rail lines, selling goods and supplies to the construction workers, many of whom were also Jewish. Later, because of the railway, some of these homesteads grew into prosperous towns. At this time, Canadian Jews also had important roles in developing the west coast fishing industry, while others worked on building telegraph lines. Some, descended from the earliest Canadian Jews, stayed true to their ancestors as fur trappers. The first major Jewish organization to appear was B'nai B'rith. Till today, B'nai B'rith Canada is the community's independent advocacy and social service organization. Also at this time, the Montreal branch of the Workmen's Circle was founded in 1907. This group was an offshoot of the Jewish Labour Bund, an outlawed party in Russia's Pale of Settlement. It was an organization for The Main's radical, non-Communist, non-religious, working class.

=== Organization ===
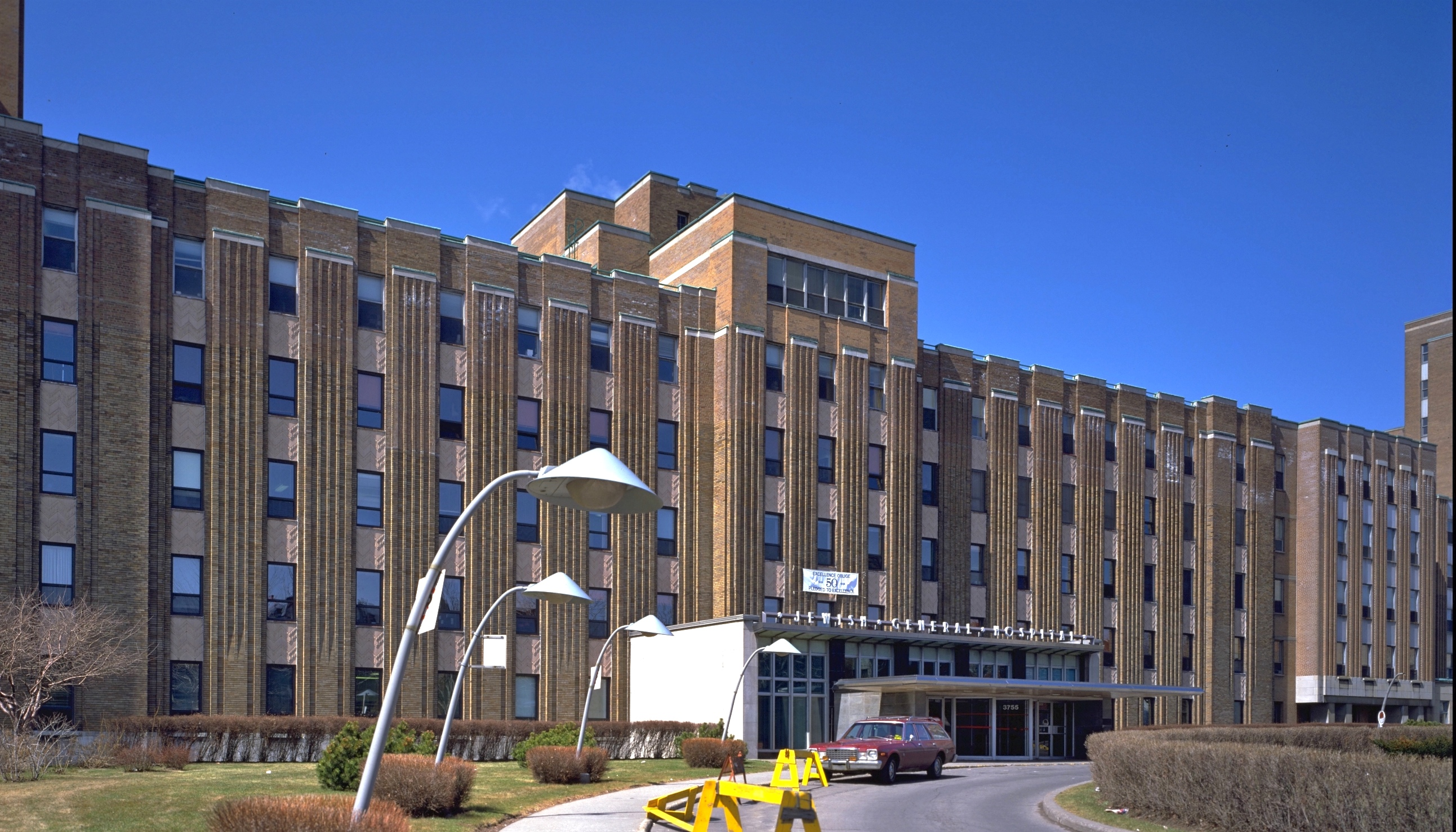
The Jewish General Hospital opened in Montreal in 1934.

By the outbreak of World War I, there were approximately 100,000 Canadian Jews, of whom three-quarters lived in either Montreal or Toronto. Many of the children of the European refugees started as peddlers, eventually working their way up to established businesses, such as retailers and wholesalers. Jewish Canadians played an essential role in the development of the Canadian clothing and textile industry. Most worked as labourers in sweatshops; while some owned the manufacturing facilities. Jewish merchants and labourers spread out from the cities to small towns, building synagogues, community centres and schools as they went.

As the population grew, Canadian Jews began to organize themselves as a community despite the presence of dozens of competing sects. The Canadian Jewish Congress (CJC) was founded in 1919 as the result of the merger of several smaller organizations. The purpose of the CJC was to speak on behalf of the common interests of Jewish Canadians and assist immigrant Jews. The largest Jewish community was in Montreal, at the time the largest, wealthiest and most cosmopolitan city in Canada. The vast majority of Montreal's Jews who arrived in the early 20th century were Yiddish-speaking Ashkenazim but their children chose speak English rather than French. Until 1964, Quebec had no public education system, instead having two parallel educational systems run by the Protestant churches and the Catholic church. As the Jewish community was too poor to fund its own educational system, most Jewish parents chose to enrol their children in the English-speaking Protestant school system, which was willing to accept Jews unlike the Catholic school system. The CJC had its headquarters in Montreal while the Jewish Public Library of Montreal and the Montreal Yiddish Theatre were two of the largest Jewish cultural institutions in Canada. The Jews of Montreal tended to be concentrated in several neighbourhoods, which gave a strong sense of community identity.

In 1930, under the impact of the Great Depression, Canada sharply limited immigration from Eastern Europe, which adversely impacted the ability of the Ashkenazim to come to Canada. In a climate of antisemitism where the Jewish immigrants were seen as economic competition for Gentiles, the leadership of the CJC was assumed by the whisky tycoon Samuel Bronfman who it was hoped might be able to persuade the government to allow more Jews to come. In view of worsening situation for Jews in Europe, allowing more Jewish immigration became the central concern of the CJC. Through many Canadian Jews voted for the Liberal Party, traditionally seen as the friend of minorities, the Liberal Prime Minister from 1935 onward, William Lyon Mackenzie King, proved to be extremely unsympathetic. Mackenzie King adamantly refused to change the immigration law, and Canada accepted proportionally the fewest Jewish refugees from Nazi Germany.

== World War II (1939–1945) ==
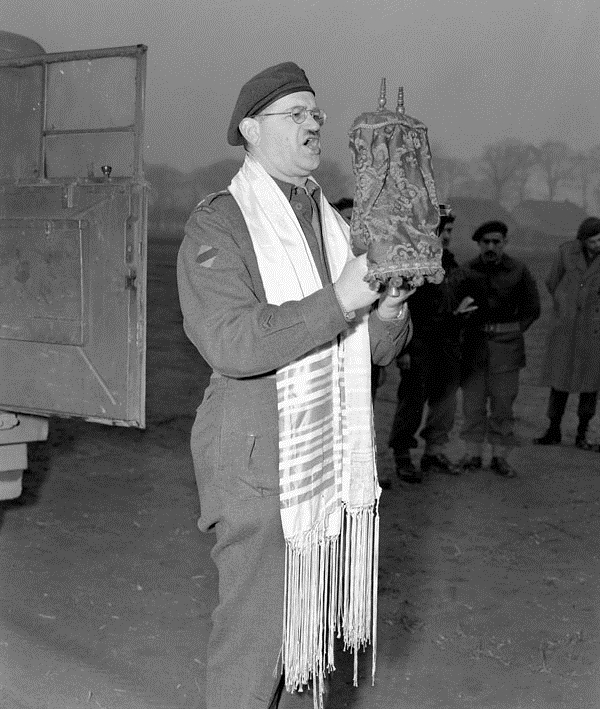
Jewish soldiers fought in the Canadian military during World War II.

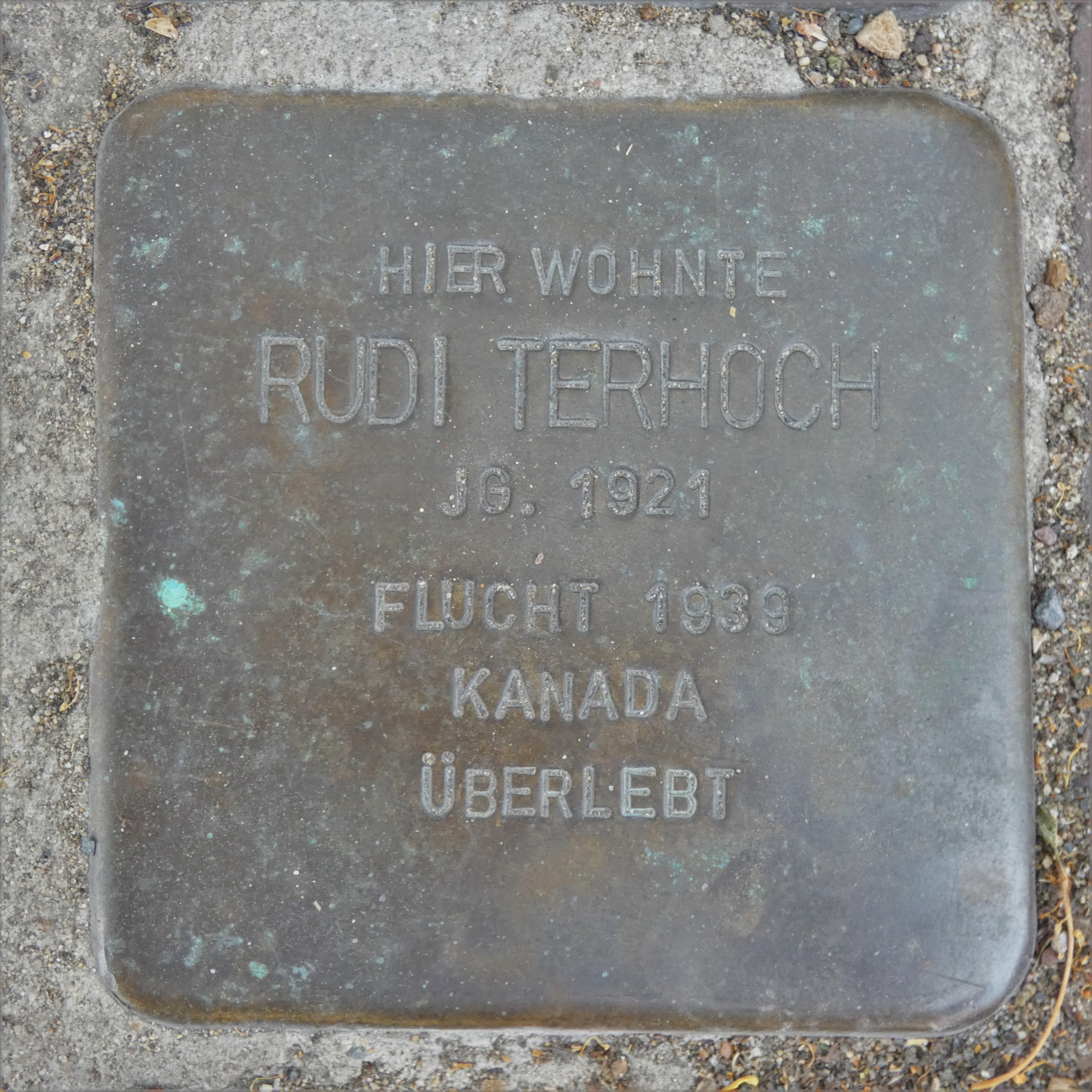
Stolperstein for Rudi Terhoch in Velen-Ramsdorf, a Jewish survivor in Canada

About 17,000 Jewish Canadians served in the Canadian Armed Forces during World War II. Major Ben Dunkelman of the Queen's Own Rifles regiment was a soldier in the campaigns of 1944–1945 in northwest Europe, highly decorated for his courage and ability under fire. In 1943, Saidye Rosner Bronfman of Montreal, the wife of the whiskey tycoon Samuel Bronfman, was appointed MBE (Member of the Order of the British Empire) for her work on the home front. Saidye Bronfram had organized 7, 000 women in Montreal to make packages for Canadian soldiers serving overseas, for which she was recognized by King George VI. Most Jewish Canadians who joined the Armed Forces at this time became members of the Royal Canadian Air Force.

In 1939, Canada turned away the MS St. Louis with 908 Jewish refugees aboard. It went back to Europe, where 254 of them died in concentration camps. And overall, Canada only accepted 5,000 Jewish refugees during the 1930s and 1940s in a climate of widespread antisemitism. A most striking display of antisemitism occurred with the 1944 Quebec election. The leader of the Union Nationale, Maurice Duplessis appealed to antisemitic prejudices in Quebec in a violently antisemitic speech by claiming that the Dominion government of William Lyon Mackenzie King together with Liberal Premier Adélard Godbout of Quebec had secretly made an agreement with the "International Zionist Brotherhood" to settle 100,000 Jewish refugees left homeless by the Holocaust in Quebec after the war in exchange for the "International Zionist Brotherhood" promising to fund both the federal and provincial Liberal parties. By contrast, Duplessis claimed that he would never take any money from the Jews, and if he were elected Premier, he would stop this alleged plan to bring Jewish refugees to Quebec. Though Duplessis' claims about the alleged plan to settle 100,000 Jewish refugees in Quebec were entirely false, his story was widely believed in Quebec, and ensured he won the election.

In 1945, several organizations merged to form the left-wing United Jewish Peoples' Order, which was one of the largest Jewish fraternal organizations in Canada for a number of years.

As in the United States, the community's response to news of the Holocaust was muted for decades. Bialystok (2000) wrote that in the 1950s, the community was "virtually devoid" of discussion. Although one in seven Canadian Jews were survivors or their children, most "did not want to know what happened, and few survivors had the courage to tell them". He argued that the main obstacle to discussion was "an inability to comprehend the event". Awareness emerged in the 1960s, as the community realized that antisemitism remained.

== Post war (1945–1997) ==
From the 1940s to the 1960s, the man generally recognized as the chief spokesman for the Canadian Jewish community was Rabbi Abraham Feinberg of the Holy Blossom Temple in Toronto. In 1950, Dorothy Sangster wrote in Macleans' about him: "Today American-born Rabbi Feinberg is one of the most controversial figures to occupy a Canadian pulpit. Gentiles recognize him as the official voice of Canadian Jewry. This fact was aptly demonstrated a few years ago when Montreal's Mayor Houde introduced him to friends as Le Cardinal des Juifs—the Cardinal of the Jews". Feinberg was very active in various social justice efforts, campaigning for laws against discrimination against minorities and to end the "restrictive covenants".

In March 1945, Rabbi Feinberg wrote an article in Maclean's charging that there was rampant antisemitism in Canada, stating:

"Jews are kept out of most ski clubs. Sundry summer colonies (even on municipally owned land), fraternities, and at least one Rotary Club operate under written or unwritten “Gentiles Only” signs. Many bank positions are not open to Jews. Only three Jewish male physicians have been admitted to the non-Jewish Hospital staff in Toronto. McGill University has instituted a rule requiring, in effect, at least a 10% higher academic average for Jewish applicants; in certain schools of the University of Toronto, anti-Jewish bias is being felt. City Councils debate whether Jewish petitioners should be permitted to build a synagogue; property deeds in some areas bar resale to them. I have seen crude handbills circulated thanking Hitler for his massacre of 80,000 Jews in Kiev."

In 1945, in the Re Drummond Wren case, a Jewish group, the Workers' Education Association (WEA) challenged the "restrictive covenants" that forbade the renting or selling of properties to Jews. Through the case was something of a set-up as the WEA had quite consciously purchased a property in Toronto known to have a "restrictive covenant" in order to challenge the legality of "restrictive covenants" in the courts, Justice John Keiller MacKay struck down "restrictive covenants" in his ruling on October 31, 1945. In 1948, MacKay's ruling in the Drummond Wren case was struck down in the Noble v Alley case by the Ontario Supreme Court, which ruled that "restrictive covenants" were "legal and enforceable". A woman named Anna Noble decided to sell her cottage at the Beach O' Pines resort to Bernard Wolf, a Jewish businessman from London, Ontario. The sale was blocked by the Beach O'Pines Resort Association which had a "restrictive covenant" forbidding the sale of cottages to any person of "Jewish, Hebrew, Semitic, Negro or colored race or blood". With the support of the Joint Public Relations Committee of the Canadian Jewish Congress and B'nai B'rith headed by Rabbi Feinberg, the Noble ruling was appealed to the Supreme Court of Canada, which in November 1950 ruled against "restrictive covenants", albeit only on the technicality that the phrase "Jewish, Hebrew, Semitic, Negro or colored race or blood" was too vague.

After the war, Canada liberalized its immigration policy. Roughly 40,000 Holocaust Survivors came during the late 1940s, hoping to rebuild their shattered lives. In 1947, the Workmen's Circle and Jewish Labour Committee started a project, spearheaded by Kalmen Kaplansky and Morris (Moishe) Lewis, to bring Jewish refugees to Montreal in the needle trades, called the Tailors Project. They were able to do this through the federal government's "bulk-labour" program that allowed labour-intensive industries to bring European displaced persons to Canada, to fill those jobs. For Lewis's work on this and other projects during this period, the Montreal branch was renamed the Moshe Lewis Branch, after he died in 1950. The Canadian arm of the Jewish Labor Committee also honored him when they established the Moshe Lewis Foundation in 1975.

In the post-war era, universities proved more willing to accept Jewish applicants and in the decades after 1945, many Canadian Jews tended to move up from a lower-class group working as menial laborers to a middle class group working as bourgeois professionals. With the ability to obtain a better education, many Jews become doctors, teachers, lawyers, dentists, accountants, professors and other bourgeois occupations. Geographically, there was a tendency for many Jews living in the inner cities of Toronto and Montreal to move out to the suburbs. The rural Jewish communities almost vanished as Jews living in rural areas decamped to the cities. Reflecting a more tolerant attitude, Canadian Jews became active on the cultural scene. In the post-war decades Peter C. Newman, Wayne and Shuster, Mordecai Richler, Leonard Cohen, Barbara Frum, Joseph Rosenblatt, Irving Layton, Eli Mandel, A.M. Klein, Henry Kreisel, Adele Wiseman, Miriam Waddington, Naim Kattan, and Rabbi Stuart Rosenberg were individuals of note in the fields of arts, journalism and literature.

Since the 1960s, a new immigration wave of Jews has started to take place. A number of French-speaking Jews from North Africa ended up settling in Montreal. Some South African Jews decided to emigrate to Canada after South Africa became a republic in 1961, and was followed by another wave in the late 1970s, which was precipitated by anti-apartheid rioting and civil unrest. The majority of them settled in Ontario, with the largest community in Toronto, followed by those in Hamilton, London and Kingston. Smaller waves of Zimbabwean Jews were also present during this period.

In 1961 Louis Rasminsky became the first Jewish governor of the Bank of Canada. Every previous governor of the Bank of Canada had been a member of the prestigious Rideau Club of Ottawa, but Rasminsky's application to join the Rideau Club was turned down on the account of his religion, a rejection that deeply hurt him. Through the Rideau Club changed its policies in response to public criticism, Rasminsky only joined the club after he retired as bank governor in 1973. In 1968, the Liberal MP Herb Gray of Windsor became the Jewish federal cabinet minister. In 1970, Bora Laskin became the first Jewish justice of the Supreme Court of Canada and in 1973, the first Jewish Chief Justice of the Supreme Court. In 1971, David Lewis became the leader of the New Democratic Party, becoming the first Jew to head a major Canadian political party.

In 1976, the Quebec provincial election was won by the separatist Parti Québécois (PQ), which sparked a major flight of Montreal's English-speaking Jews to Toronto, with about 20,000 leaving. The Jewish community of Montreal has been a bastion of federalism, and Quebec separatists, with their goal of creating a nation-state for French-Canadians, have tended to be hostile to Jews. In both the 1980 and 1995 referendums, Montreal's Jews voted overwhelmingly for Quebec to remain in Canada.

It was official Canadian policy after 1945 to accept immigrants from Eastern Europe as long they were anti-communist even if they had fought for Nazi Germany. For example the veterans of the 14th Waffen SS Division Galizien, which was mostly recruited from Ukrainians in Galicia, settled in Canada. The fact that the men of the 14th Waffen-SS division had committed war crimes was ignored because they were felt to be useful for the Cold War. In Oakville, Ontario, a public monument honors the men of the 14th SS Division as heroes. Starting in the 1980s, Jewish groups began to lobby the Canadian government to deport the Axis collaborators from Eastern Europe whom the government of Canada had welcomed with open arms in the 1940s–1950s. In 1997, a report by Sol Littman, the head of Simon Wiesenthal Center operations in Canada charged that Canada in 1950 had accepted 2,000 veterans of 14th Waffen-SS Division with no screening; the American news program 60 Minutes showed that Canada had allowed about 1,000 SS veterans from the Baltic states to become Canadian citizens; and the Jerusalem Post called Canada a "near-blissful refuge" for Nazi war criminals. The Canadian Jewish historian Irving Abella stated that for Eastern Europeans the best way of getting into postwar Canada "was by showing the SS tattoo. This proved that you were an anti-Communist". Despite pressure from Jewish groups, the Canadian government dragged its feet on deporting Nazi war criminals out of the fear of offending voters of Eastern European background, who make up a significant number of Canadian voters.

== Modernity (since 2001) ==
Today, the Jewish culture in Canada is maintained by practising Jews and secular Jews. Nearly all Jews in Canada speak one of the two official languages, although most speak English over French. Most Ashkenazi Jews speak English as a first language, including most Ashkenazi Jews in Quebec.

In terms of Jewish denominations, 26% of Canadian Jews are Conservative, 17% Orthodox, 16% Reform, 29% are "Just Jewish", and the remaining 12% align themselves with smaller movements or are unsure. Intermarriage is relatively low among Canadian Jews, with 77% of married Jews having a Jewish spouse.

Most of Canada's Jews live in Ontario and Quebec, followed by British Columbia, Manitoba and Alberta. While Toronto currently contains the largest Jewish community, Montreal held this position until the 1970s, when many English-speaking Jewish Canadians left for Toronto, fearing that Quebec might leave the federation following the rise of nationalist political parties, as well as a result of Quebec's Language Law.

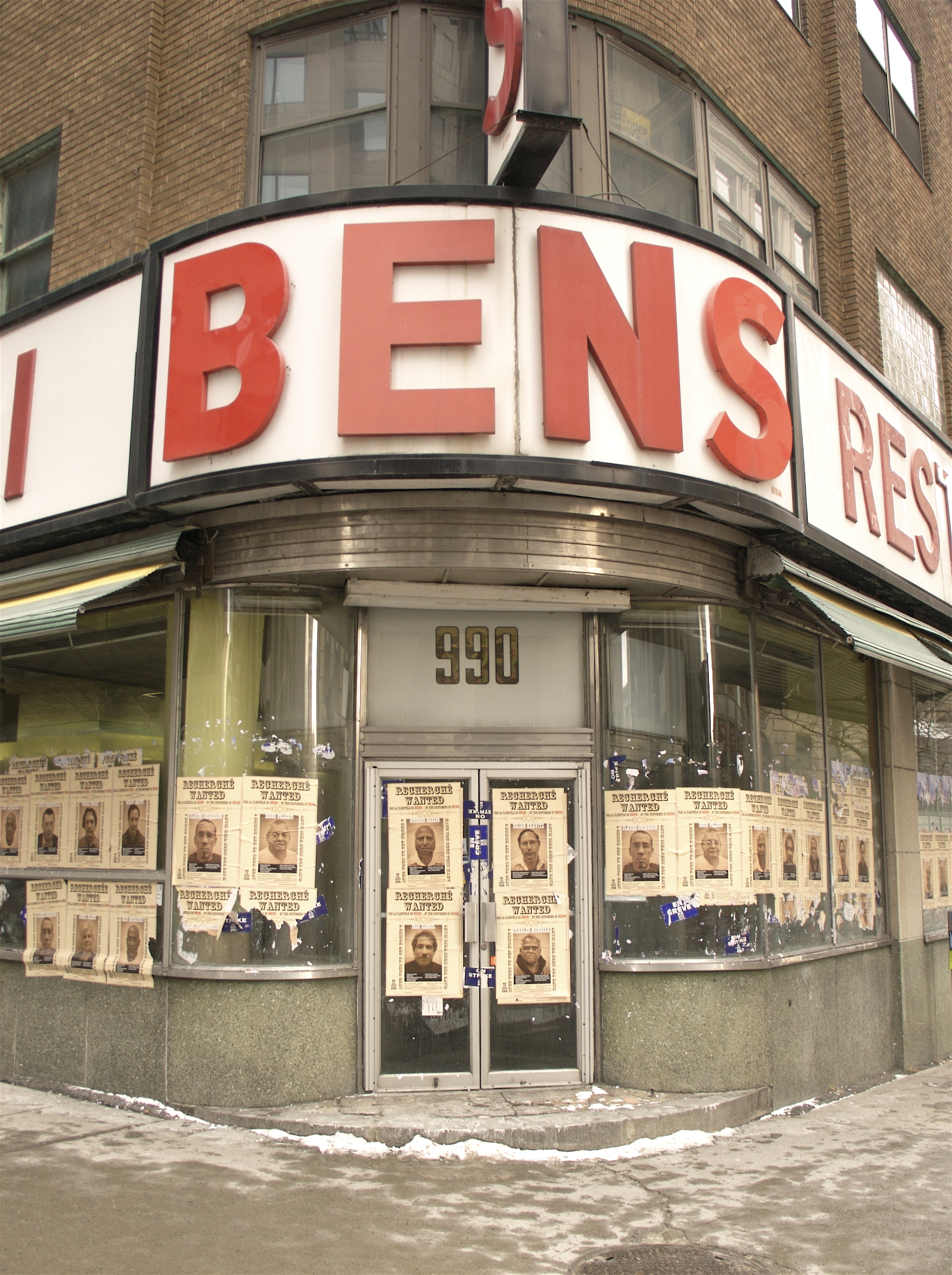
Ben's Deli was a Montreal icon during the 20th century

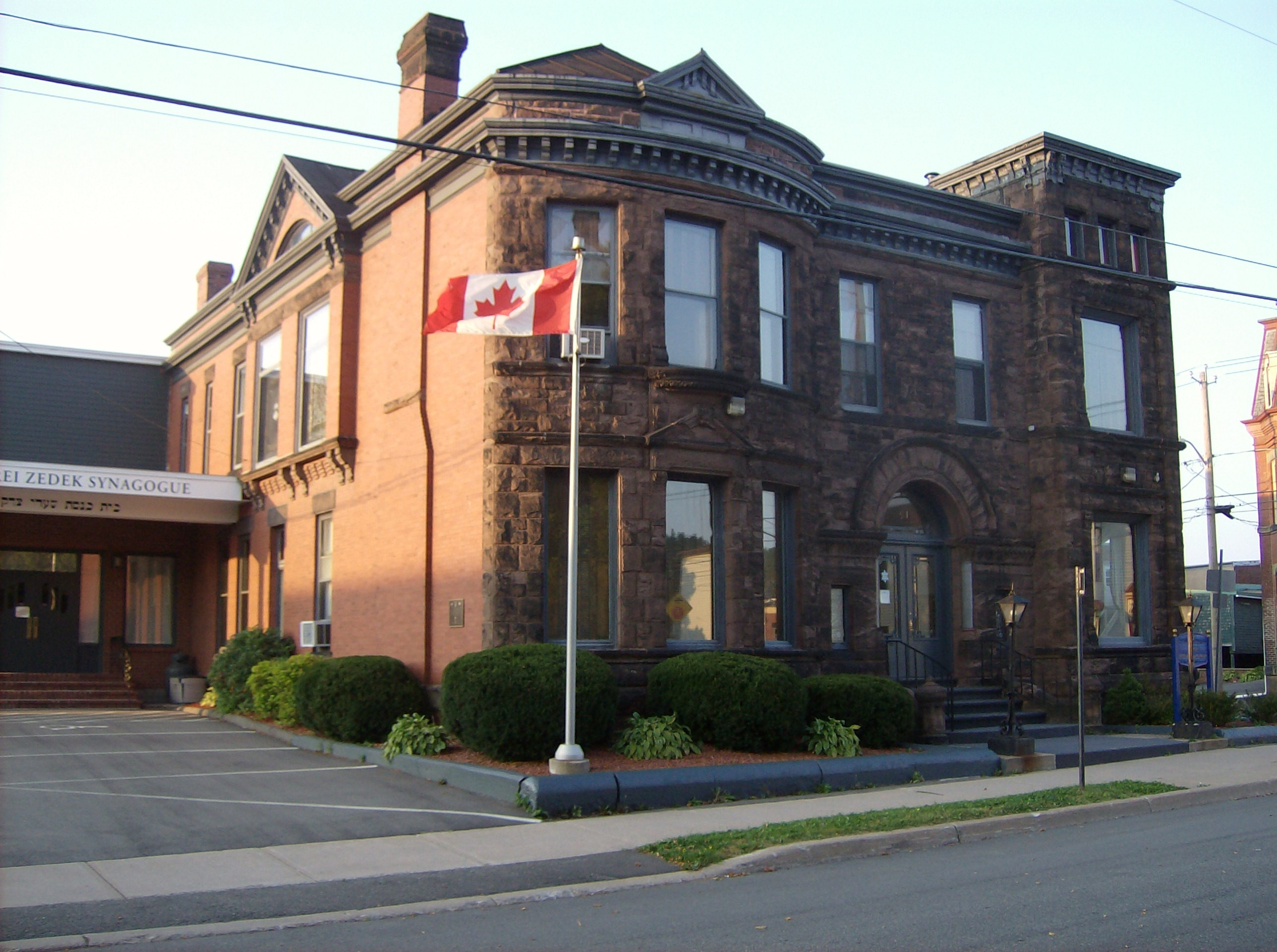
Saint John Jewish Historical Museum in Saint John, New Brunswick

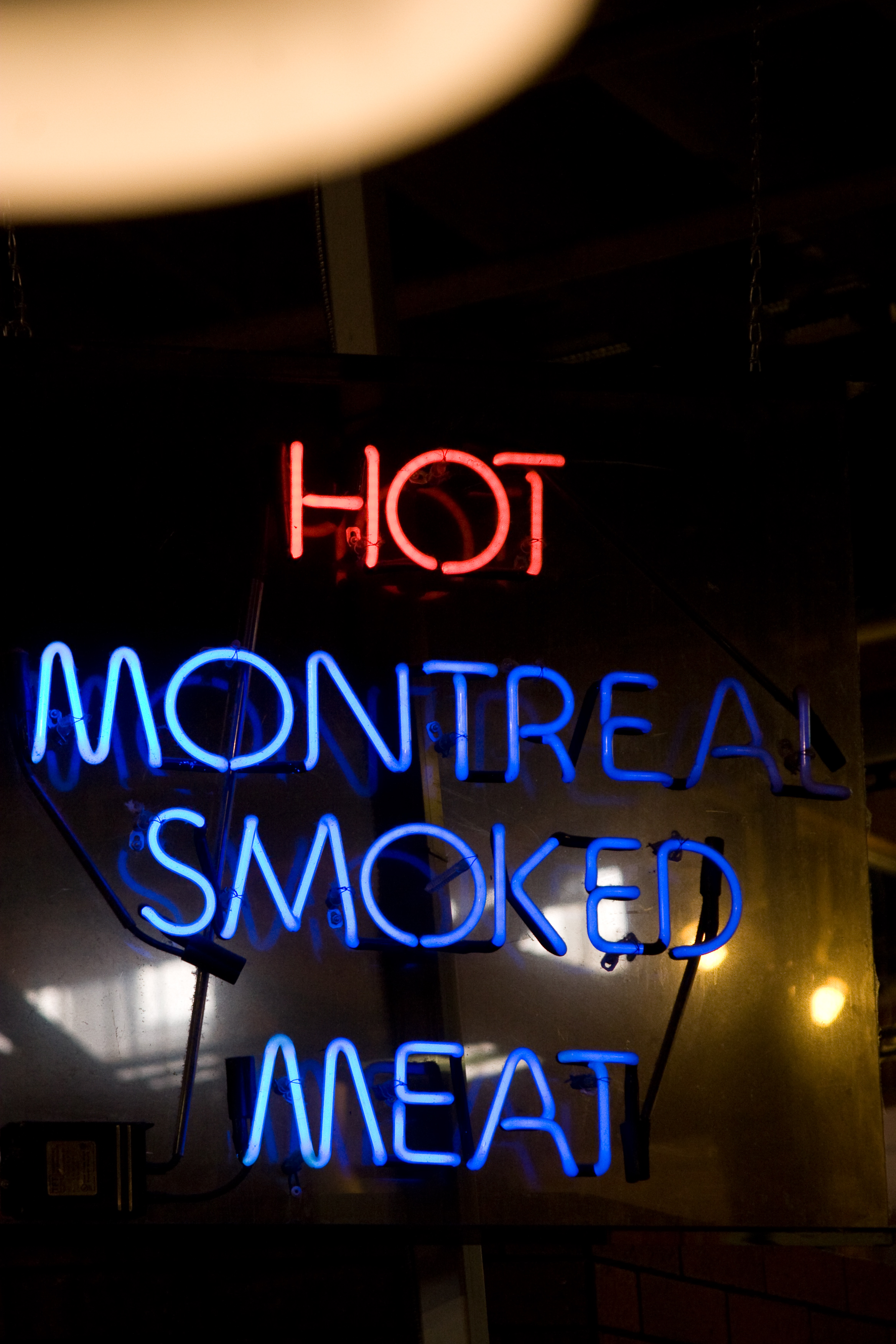
A sign at Siegel's Bagels, Granville Island, Vancouver

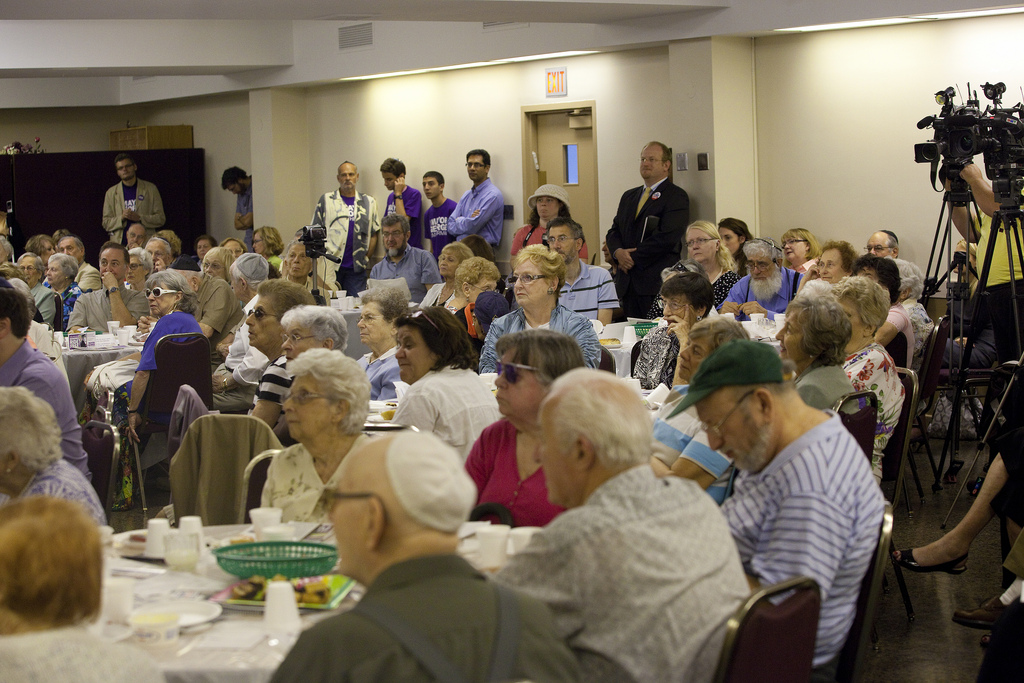
Association of Jewish Seniors/CJPAC hosting a Toronto Mayoral candidates' debate, 2010

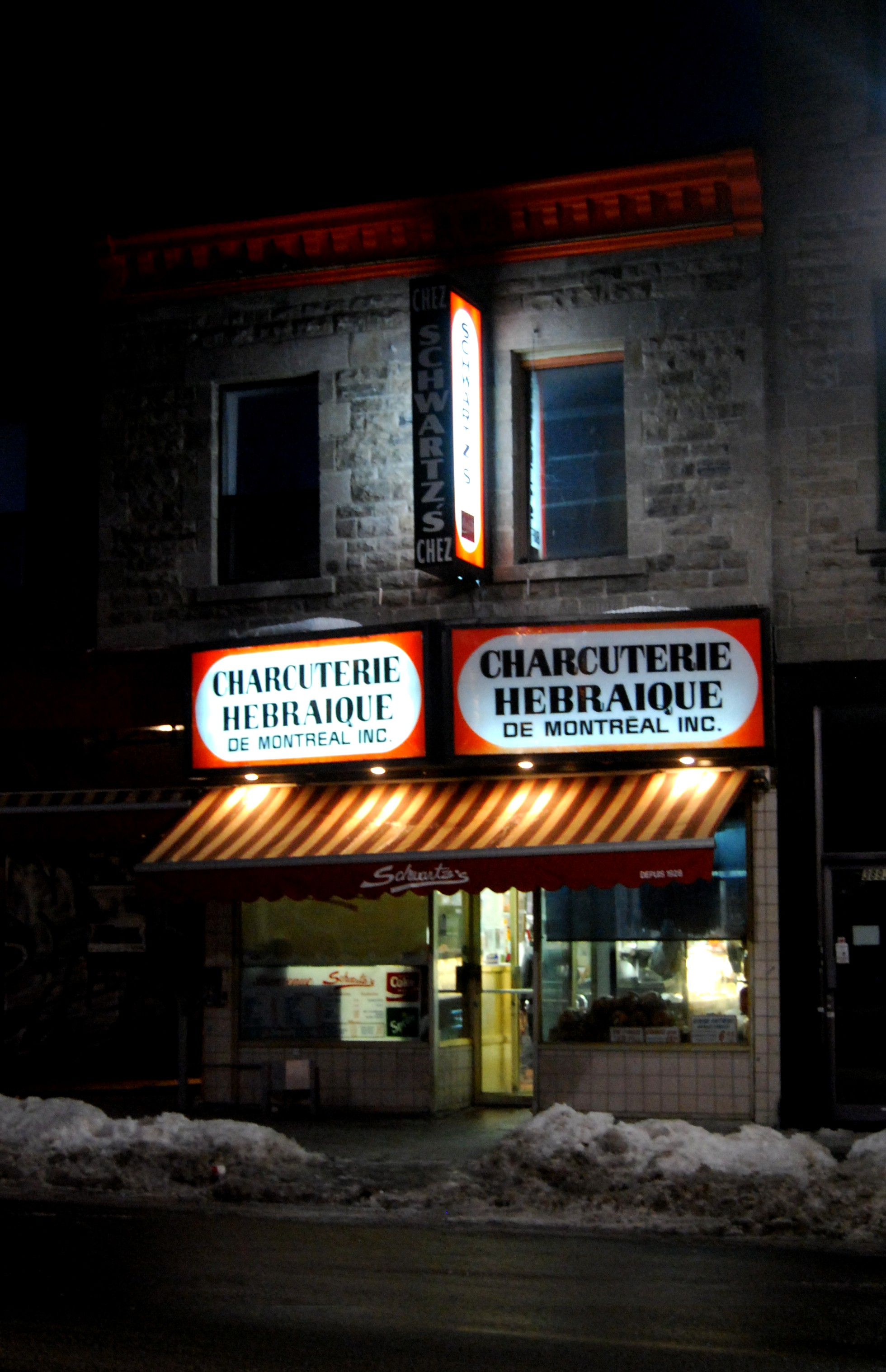
Schwartz's Hebrew Delicatessen, a popular deli in Montreal

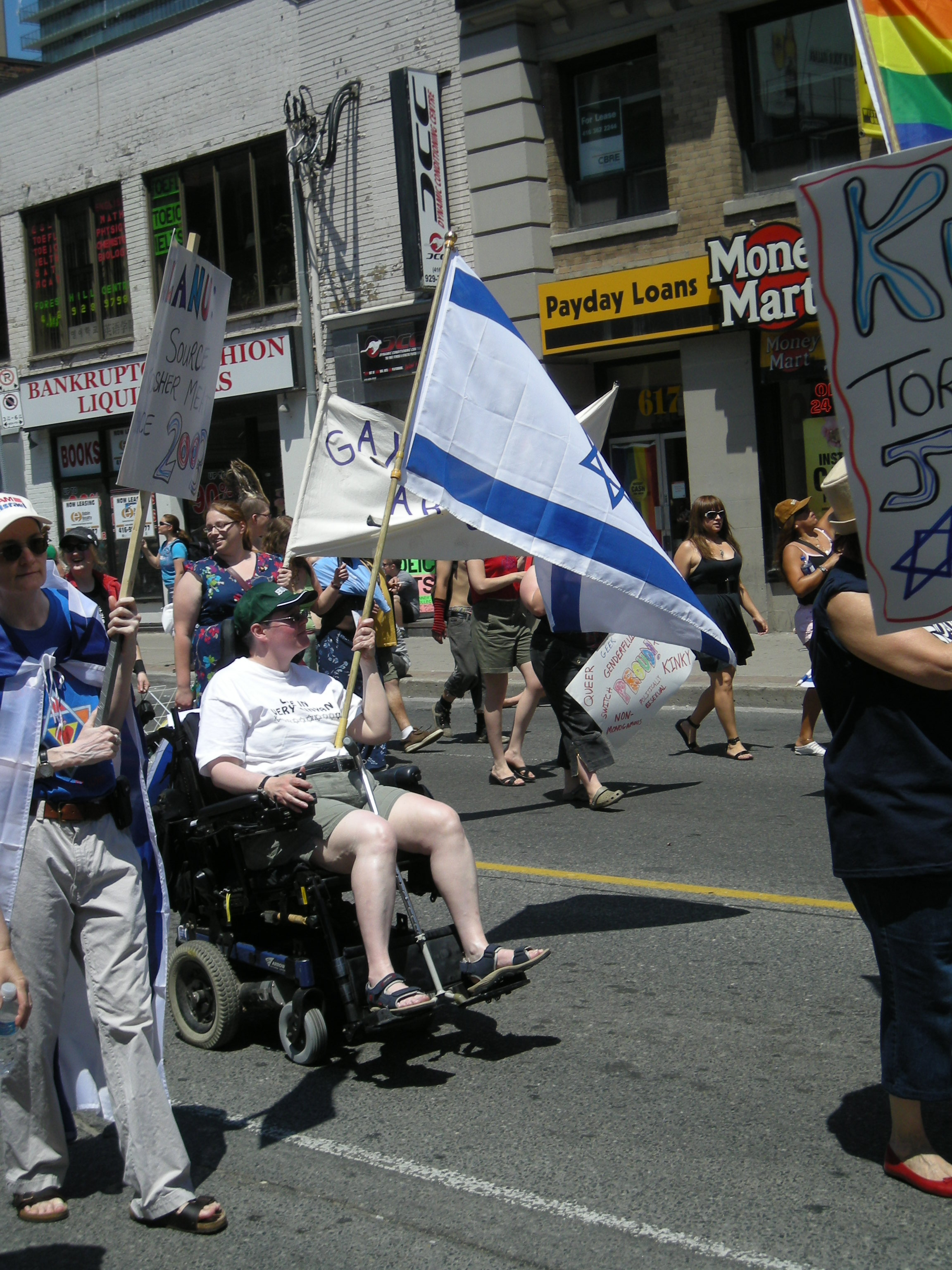
Jewish members of Toronto Pride 2009 Parade for LGBT pride

The Jewish population is growing rather slowly due to aging and low birth rates. The population of Canadian Jews increased by just 3.5% between 1991 and 2001, despite much immigration from the former Soviet Union, Israel, and other countries.

Politically, the major Jewish Canadian organizations are the Centre for Israel and Jewish Advocacy (CIJA) and the more conservative B'nai Brith Canada, both claim to be the voice of the Jewish community. The United Jewish People's Order, once the largest Jewish fraternal organization in Canada, is a left-leaning secular group established in 1927 with current chapters in Toronto, Hamilton, Winnipeg and Vancouver. Politically, UJPO opposes the Israeli Occupation and advocates for a two-state solution, but focuses primarily on Jewish cultural, educational and social justice issues. A smaller organization, Independent Jewish Voices (Canada), characterized as anti-Zionist, argues that the CIJA and B'nai B'rith do not speak for most Canadian Jews. Also, many Canadian Jews simply have no connections to any of these organizations.

The birth rate for Jews in Canada is much higher than that in the United States, with a TFR of 1.91 according to the 2001 Census. This is due to the presence of large numbers of Orthodox Jews in Canada. According to the census, the Jewish birth rate and TFR is higher than that of Christian (1.35), Buddhist (1.34), Non-Religious (1.41), and Sikh (1.9) populations, but slightly lower than that of Hindus (2.05), and Muslims (2.01).

In the 21st century, antisemitism has become a growing concern, with reports of antisemitic incidents increasing sharply in recent years. In 2009, the Canadian Parliamentary Coalition to Combat Antisemitism was established by all four major federal political parties to investigate and combat antisemitism, namely new antisemitism. The League for Human Rights of B'nai B'rith monitors the incidents and prepares an annual audit of these events. There was an increase of the scope of antisemitic incidents in Canada with a number of cases of antisemitic vandalism and spraying Nazi symbols in August 2013 in Winnipeg and in the greater Toronto area.

On February 26, 2014, and for the first time in Canadian history, B'nai Brith Canada led an official delegation of Sephardi community leaders, activists, philanthropists and spiritual leaders from across the country visiting Parliament Hill and meeting with the prime minister, ambassadors and other dignitaries.

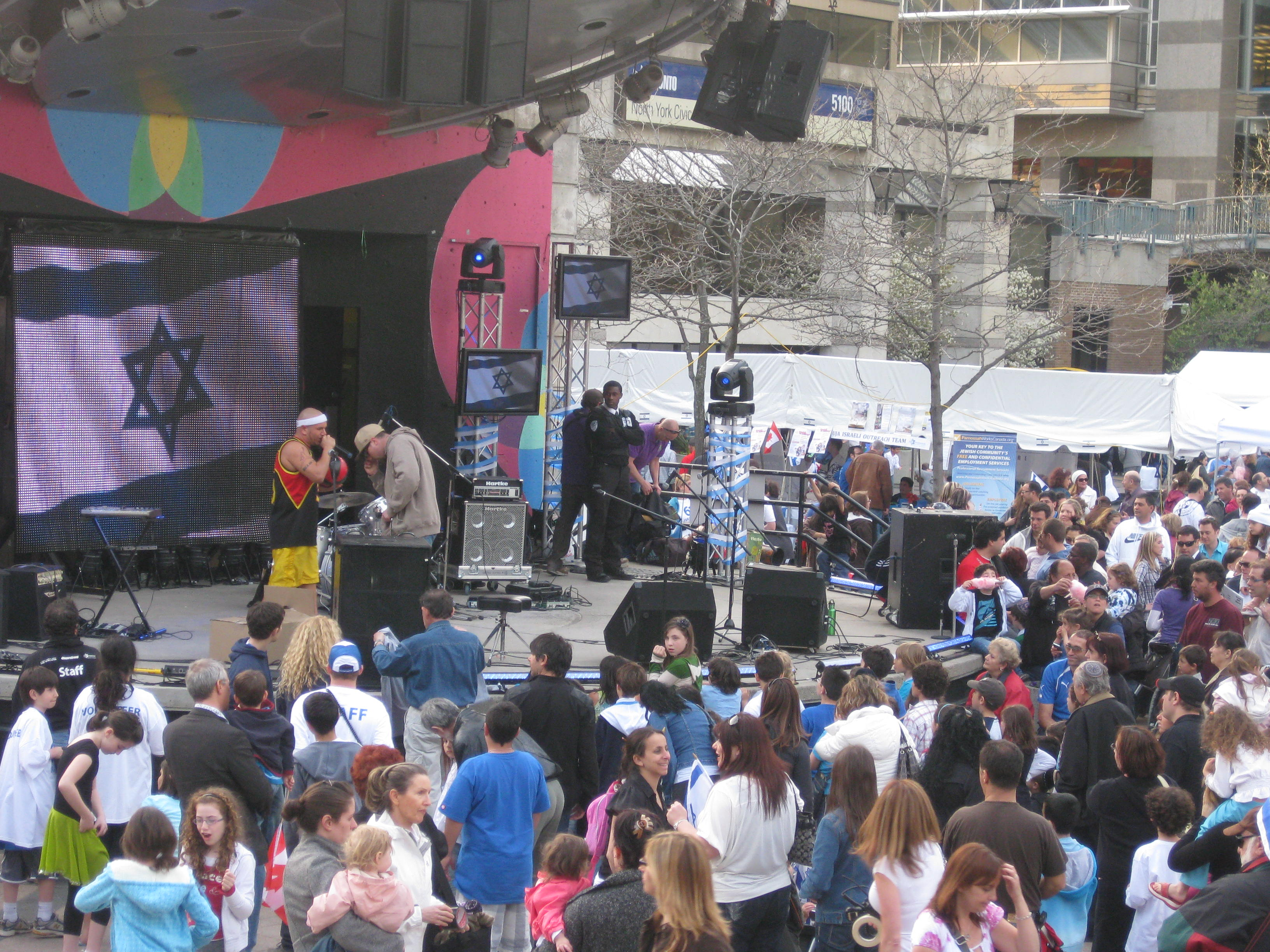
Israeli Canadians and Jewish Canadians celebrating Yom Ha'atzmaut in Toronto.

Since the beginning of the 21st century, Jewish immigration to Canada has continued, increasing in numbers with the passing of the years. With the rise of antisemitic acts in France and weak economic conditions, most of the Jewish newcomers are French Jews who are mainly looking for new economic opportunities (either in Israel or elsewhere, with Canada one of the top destinations chosen by French Jews to live in, particularly in Quebec). For the same reasons, and due to cultural and linguistic proximity, several members of the Belgian-Jewish community choose Canada as their new home. There are efforts by the Jewish community of Montreal to attract these immigrants and make them feel at home, as well as those from other parts of the world. There is also some immigration of Argentine Jews and from other parts of Latin America. Argentina is home to the largest Jewish community in Latin America and the third largest in the Americas after the United States and Canada.

A population of Israeli Jews emigrates to Canada to study and work. The Israeli Canadian community is growing, and it is one of the largest Israeli diaspora groups with an estimated 30,000 people. A small proportion of Israeli Jews who come to Canada are Ethiopian Jews.

=== Afghan Jews ===
Following the Fall of Kabul in August 2021, the final Afghan Jew still in Afghanistan, Tova Moradi, fled to Canada. This marked the end of Afghanistan's 2,700-year Jewish history.

== Demographics ==
=== Provincial and territorial ===
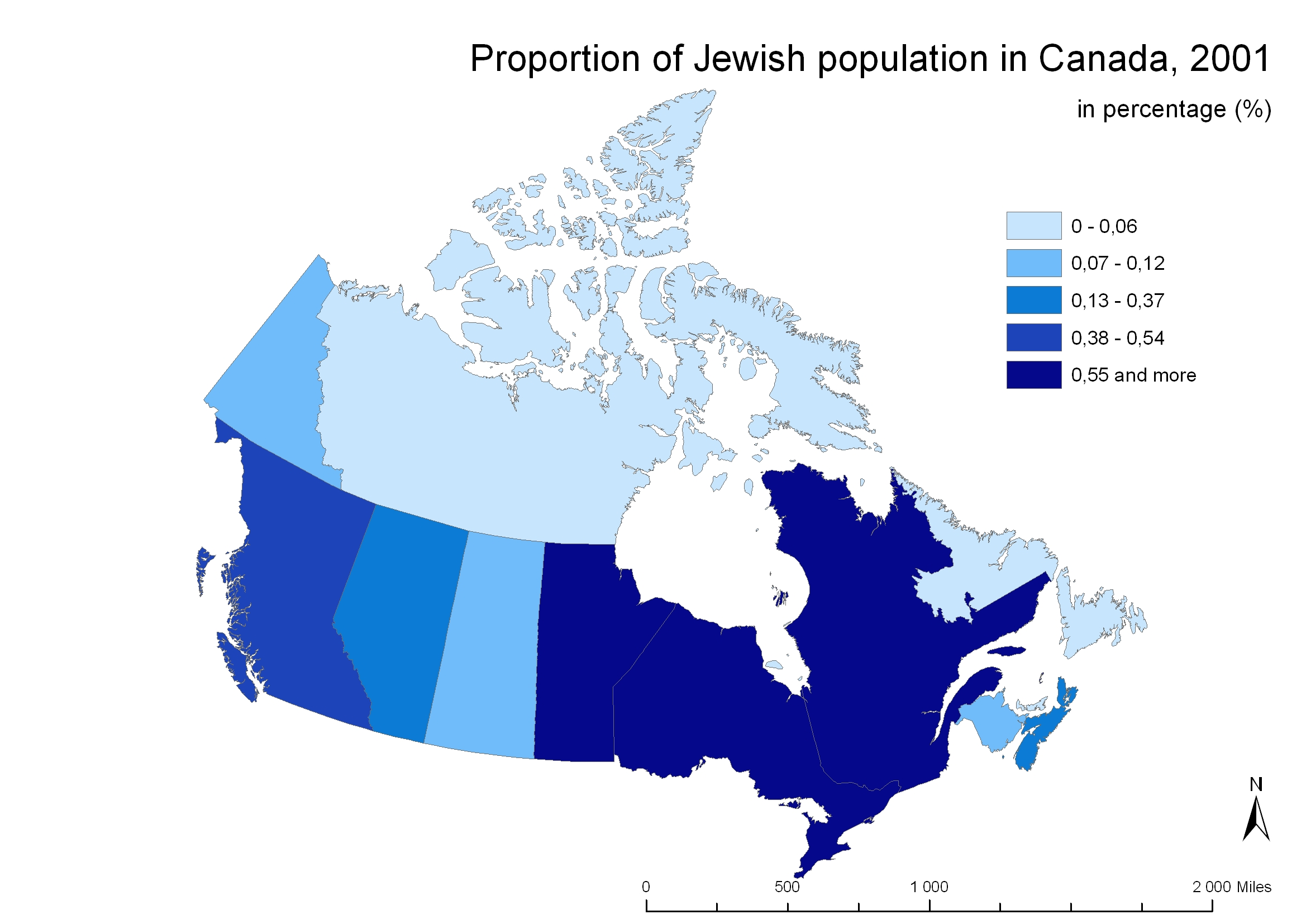
Percentage of Jewish population in Canada, 2001.

Jewish Canadian population by province and territory in Canada in 2011 according to Statistics Canada and United Jewish Federations of Canada

Province or territory	Jews	Percentage
Canada	391,665	1.2%
Ontario	226,610	1.8%
Quebec	93,625	1.2%
British Columbia	35,005	0.8%
Alberta	15,795	0.4%
Manitoba	14,345	1.2%
Nova Scotia	2,910	0.3%
Saskatchewan	1,905	0.2%
New Brunswick	860	0.1%
Newfoundland and Labrador	220	0.0%
Prince Edward Island	185	0.1%
Yukon	145	0.4%
Northwest Territories	40	0.1%
Nunavut	15	0.1%

=== Municipal ===
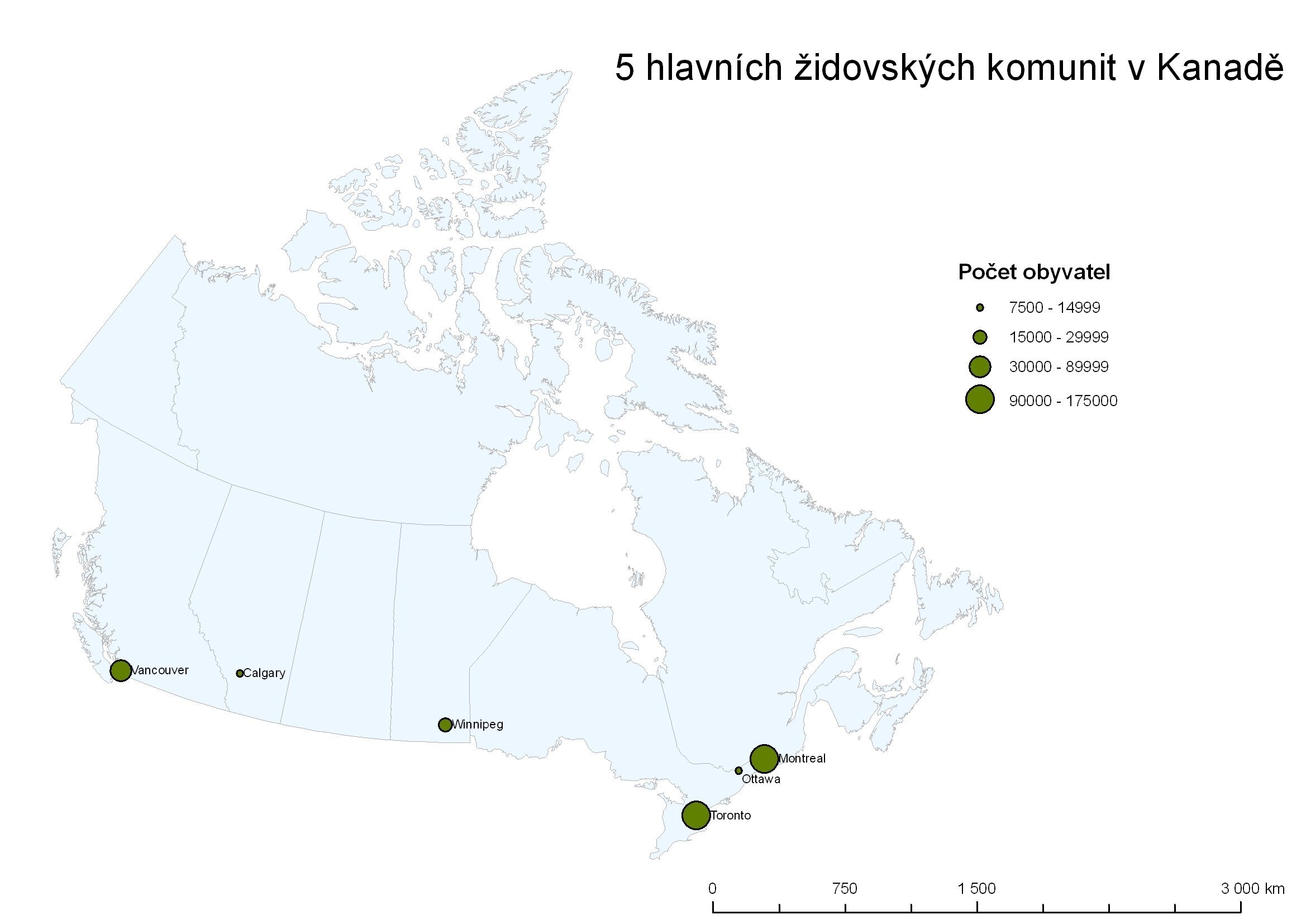

	2001			2011			Trend
City	Population	Jews	Percentage	Population	Jews	Percentage	
Greater Toronto Area	5,081,826	179,100	3.5%	6,054,191	188,710	3.1%	▲5.4%
Greater Montreal	3,380,645	92,975	2.8%	3,824,221	90,780	2.4%	▼2.4%
Greater Vancouver	1,967,480	22,590	1.1%	2,313,328	26,255	1.1%	▲16.2%
Calgary	943,315	7,950	0.8%	1,096,833	8,335	0.8%	▲4.8%
Ottawa	795,250	13,130	1.7%	883,390	14,010	1.6%	▲6.7%
Edmonton	666,105	4,920	0.7%	812,201	5,550	0.7%	▲12.8%
Winnipeg	619,540	14,760	2.4%	663,617	13,690	2.0%	▼7.2%
Hamilton	490,270	4,675	1.0%	519,949	5,110	1.0%	▲9.3%
Kitchener-Waterloo	495,845	1,950	0.4%	507,096	2,015	0.4%	▲3.3%
Halifax	355,945	1,985	0.6%	390,096	2,120	0.5%	▲6.8%
London	336,539	2,290	0.7%	366,151	2,675	0.7%	▲16.8%
Victoria	74,125	2,595	3.5%	80,017	2,740	3.4%	▲5.6%
Windsor	208,402	1,525	0.7%	210,891	1,515	0.7%	▼0.7%

== Culture ==
=== Yiddish ===
Yiddish (יידיש) is the historical and cultural language of Ashkenazi Jews, who make up the majority of the Canadian Jewry and was widely spoken within the Canadian Jewish community up to the middle of the twentieth century.

Montreal had and to some extent still has one of the most thriving Yiddish communities in North America. Yiddish was Montreal's third language (after French and English) for the entire first half of the 20th century. The Kanader Adler (The Canadian Eagle), Montreal's daily Yiddish newspaper founded by Hirsch Wolofsky, appeared from 1907 to 1988. The Monument National was the centre of Yiddish theatre from 1896 until the construction of the Saidye Bronfman Centre for the Arts, inaugurated on September 24, 1967, where the established resident theatre, the Dora Wasserman Yiddish Theatre, remains the only permanent Yiddish theatre in North America. The theatre group also tours Canada, the US, Israel, and Europe. In 1931, 99% of Montreal Jews stated that Yiddish was their mother language. In the 1930s, there was a Yiddish language education system and a Yiddish newspaper in Montreal. In 1938, most Jewish households in Montreal primarily used English and often used French and Yiddish. 9% of the Jewish households only used French, and 6% only used Yiddish.

In 1980 Chaim Leib Fox published Hundert yor yidishe un hebreyishe literatur in Kanade ("One Hundred Years of Yiddish and Hebrew Literature in Canada") – a compendium on the history of literature and culture of the Jewish diaspora in Canada. The comprehensive volume covered 429 Yiddish and Hebrew authors who published in Canada in 1870–1970. According to Vivian Felsen, it was "the most ambitious attempt to preserve Yiddish culture in Canada."

=== Press ===
The Canadian Jewish News was, until April 2020, Canada's most widely-read Jewish community newspaper. It had suffered from financial shortfalls for years, which were exacerbated by the impact of the coronavirus pandemic in Canada on its finances. CJN president Elizabeth Wolfe stated that "The CJN suffered from a pre-existing condition and has been felled by COVID-19."

Shortly thereafter, two new Jewish community newspapers made their debuts, with the Canadian Jewish Record and TheJ.ca beginning publication in May 2020. These two papers sought to fill the void left by the CJN, but unlike the CJN, had politically partisan editorial stances. The left-leaning Canadian Jewish Record was noted by its CEO as "not an anti-Zionist outlet, but rather that the newspaper will periodically provide legitimate criticism of the State of Israel. TheJ.ca, by contrast, has emphasized that its stance on the question of Israel is right-leaning, with staff journalist and co-founder Dave Gordon saying "we’re very pro-Israel, very Zionistic [sic] …" while Ron East, a publisher of TheJ.ca, has voiced opposition to progressive Jewish activism, claiming that right-wing Zionist viewpoints are "drowned out," thereby necessitating "a platform that would allow for those voices".

In May 2021, the Canadian Jewish News relaunched as a digital-only publication at thecjn.ca. In December 2020, the Canadian Jewish Record announcing it would end its run with a post titled "A Note from the Publisher: The Bridge is Now Completed", stating that it had intended "to be a bridge between the recently shuttered Canadian Jewish News and its hoped-for return," and given that the CJN had managed to relaunch, it (The Canadian Jewish Record) would cease publication. The CJN resumed its journalistic reporting, and now also hosts an email newsletter, as well as several weekly podcasts.

=== Museums and monuments ===
Canada has several Jewish museums and monuments, which focus upon Jewish culture and Jewish history.

== Socioeconomics ==
=== Education ===
There are numerous Jewish day schools throughout the country, as well as a number of Yeshivot. In Toronto, around 40% of Jewish children attend Jewish elementary schools and 12% go to Jewish high schools. The figures for Montreal are higher: 60% and 30%, respectively. The national average for attendance at Jewish elementary schools is at least 55%.

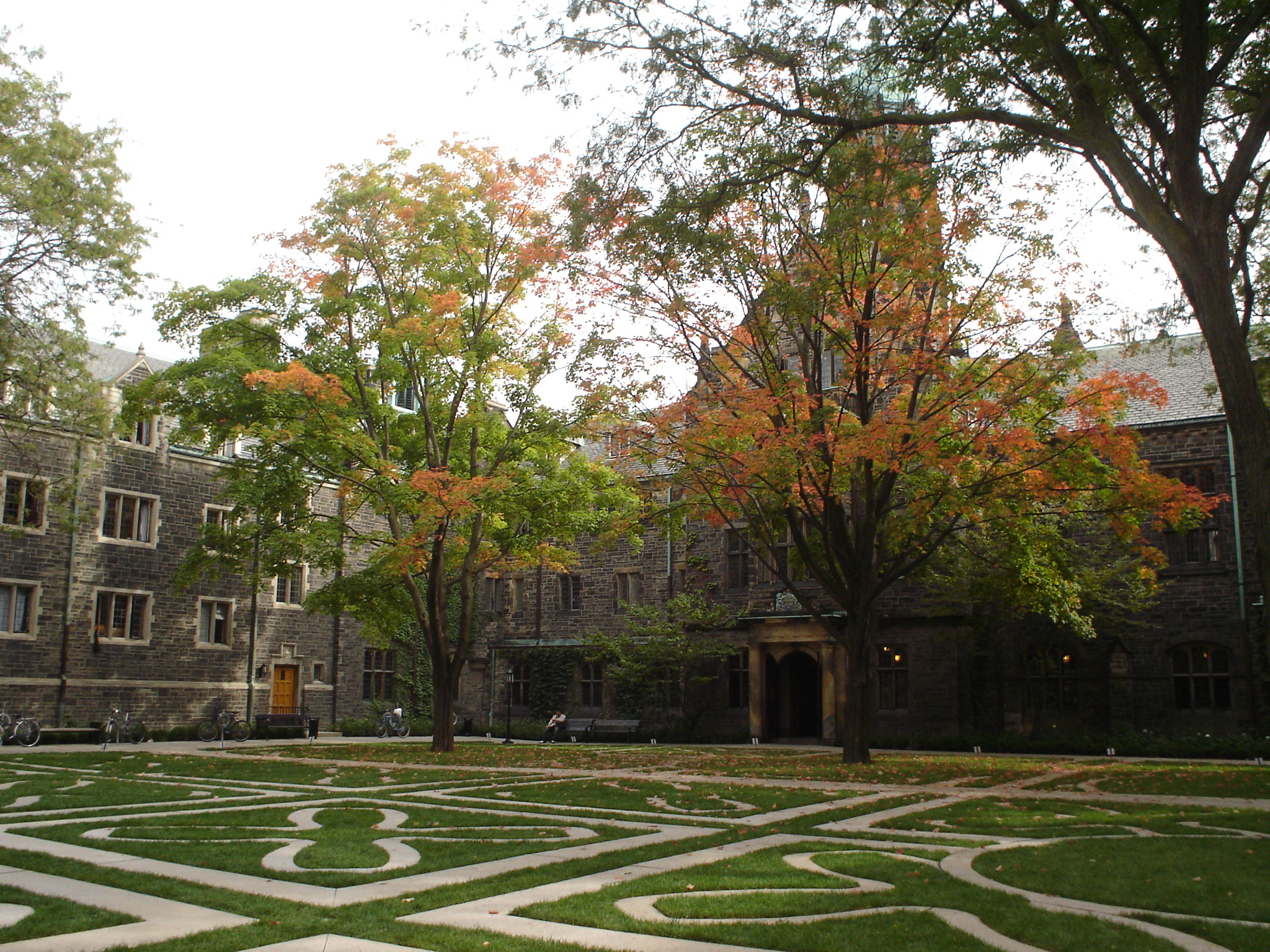
Canadian Jews make up a significant percentage of student body of Canada's leading higher education institutions. For instance, at the University of Toronto, Canadian Jews account for 5% of the student body, over 5 times the proportion of Jews in Canada.

The Jewish community in Canada is among the country's most educated groups. In 1991, four out of ten doctors and dentists in Toronto were Jewish, and nationally, four times as many Jews completed graduate degrees as Canadians generally. In the same study, it was found that 43% of Jewish Canadians had a bachelor's degree or higher, while the comparable figure for persons of British origin is 19% and just 16% for the general Canadian population as a whole.

In 2016, 80% of Canadian Jewish adults aged 25–64 had a Bachelor's Degree, while only 29% of the general Canadian population did. An additional 37% of Canadian Jews in this age range had post-graduate or professional degrees.

Jewish Canadians comprise approximately one percent of the Canadian population, but make up a significantly larger percentage of the student body of some of the most prestigious universities in Canada.

Reputation Rankings (Maclean's)	University	Jewish Students	% of Student Body
1	University of Toronto	3,000	5%
2	University of British Columbia	1,000	2%
3	University of Waterloo	1,200	3%
4	McGill University	3,550	10%
5	McMaster University	900	3%
7	Queen's University	2,000	7%
8	University of Western Ontario	3,250	10%
15	Ryerson University	1,650	3%
17	Concordia University	1,125	3%
18	University of Ottawa	850	2%
20	York University	4,000	7%

=== Employment ===
Before the mass Jewish immigration of the 1880s, the Canadian Jewish community was relatively affluent compared to other ethnic groups in Canada, a distinguishable feature that continues on to this day. During the 18th and the 19th centuries, upper class Jews tended to be fur traders, merchants, and entrepreneurs.

At the turn of the 20th century, most Jewish heads of household were self-employed wholesalers, retailers, or peddlers, though large numbers of Jews began to enter the blue-collar labour force in the early 1900s and 1910s, particularly in the garment sector. By 1915, half the Toronto Jewish community was self-employed, and the other half were blue-collar workers employed, mostly by non-Jews, in the secondary segment of the labor market. By the early 1930s, there were approximately 400 Jewish-owned garment shops and factories in Toronto, and white Anglo-Saxon manufacturers' control of this sector was no longer total. Geographer Daniel Hiebert wrote that "Jewish entrepreneurs were successful because they could rely upon resources within their ethnic group, such as the large number of Jewish-owned clothing retail stores and, more particularly, the presence of a skilled co-ethnic labor force." In 1930, fully half of all Canadians working in pawn shops were Jewish. That year, only 2.2% of Jews were working in law or medicine (though this was double the overall Canadian rate of 1.1%).

Canadian Jews' participation in labour and trade union activism through the 1940s and into midcentury is noteworthy. The Canadian Jewish Labour Committee, whose membership peaked at 50,000, represented trade unions with a large Jewish membership, including the International Ladies Garment Workers Union, the Amalgamated Clothing Workers’ Union, and the United Cap, Hat and Millinery Workers’ Union. Following WWII, Jewish Canadians turned their attention to combating structural antisemitism in the employment: many Canadian universities, boardrooms, banks, educational institutions, professional associations and businesses discriminated against Jewish applicants, or restricted participation and advancement through quotas as a matter of policy.

In the early 1950s, popular support for anti-discrimination legislation increased, and by the 1960s, multiple provinces had created human rights commissions and enacted legislation proscribing discrimination on the basis of race or religion in employment, enabling Jews to participate more fully in a variety of sectors and industries.

It became possible for Jewish lawyers to practice law outside their community beginning in the late 1960s and early 1970s, ultimately resulting in a considerable increase in the number of Jewish lawyers employed in large Canadian law firms in the 1990s. A 1960 study found that although 40% of Jews had grades in the top 10% of their class, only 8% of Jewish lawyers surveyed were employed in large law firms, which resulted in lower wages. By the 1990s, the numbers of Jews and non-Jews employed in large firms had more or less equalized.

=== Economics ===
According to a 2018 study of the Canadian Jewish community by the Environics Institute for Survey Research, annual household income was reported as follows:

Annual household income
Income	Weighted sample
Less than $75k	21%
$75k-$150k	24%
$150k and above	22%
Don't know/No answer	32%

==== Wealth ====
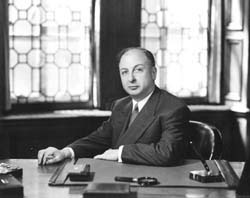
Samuel Bronfman is a member of the Bronfman Canadian Jewish family dynasty.

The majority of Canadian Jews fall into the middle class (defined as an income between $45,000 and $120,000) or upper-middle class. Some of the wealthiest Canadian Jewish families include the Bronfmans, the Belzbergs, the Diamonds, the Reichmanns, and the Shermans. Canadian Jews comprise roughly 17% of Canadian Business's list of the 100 Richest Canadians.

==== Poverty ====
As of 2015, the median income among Canadian Jews over the age of 15 years is $30,670, and 14.6% of Canadian Jews live below the poverty line, with poverty concentrated among Jews in the Toronto area. (By comparison, the percentage of non-Jewish Canadians living below the poverty line is 14.8%.) Slightly more Jewish women than Jewish men live in poverty, and poverty is most concentrated among Canadian Jews ages 15–24 and those over the age of 65. There is a strong correlation with the level of education attained, with poverty most concentrated among Canadian Jews who had only a secondary education, and the lowest levels of poverty among those who had attained a postgraduate degree.

== See also ==
- Middle Eastern Canadians
- Historic Jewish Quarter, Montreal
- Israeli Canadians
- List of Orthodox Jewish communities in Canada
- List of Canadian Jews
- List of Jewish Canadian writers
- Antisemitism in Canada
- Religion in Canada
- American Jews
- Canada Park
