= Blanshard Street =

Street in Victoria, British Columbia, Canada

Coordinates: 48.435°N 123.3628°W

Blanshard Street is an arterial road in Victoria, British Columbia, Canada. The Save-On-Foods Memorial Centre and Mayfair Shopping Centre are located along Blanshard. It has been the route for the Pat Bay Highway (Highway 17) through Victoria since 1978 when the Blanshard Extension was completed from Hillside Street to Douglas Street.

Among the more notable buildings on the street is the Romanesque Revival building of Congregation Emanu-El, the oldest surviving synagogue building in Canada.

The street is named for Richard Blanshard, the first governor of the Colony of Vancouver Island.
