= Edenbridge =

Edenbridge may mean:

- Edenbridge (band), a symphonic metal band from Austria
- Edenbridge, Kent, a town in England
- Edenbridge, Saskatchewan, a former Jewish settlement in Canada
- Humber Valley Village, a neighbourhood in Toronto, Ontario, Canada, commonly referred to as Edenbridge-Humber Valley
