= David Kaufman =

David Kaufman or David Kaufmann may refer to:

- David S. Kaufman (1813–1851), American politician
- David Kaufman (actor) (born 1961), American actor and voice actor
- David Kaufman (author), theater critic and author of biographies of Charles Ludlam and Doris Day
- David Kaufman (tailor) (1833–1912), early Jewish pioneer
- David Kaufmann (1852–1899), Jewish-Austrian scholar
- David Kaufman (journalist), writer and journalist
- Dziga Vertov (1896–1954), Soviet filmmaker-experimenter
