= Congregation Emanu-El (Victoria, British Columbia) =

Jewish synagogue in British Columbia, Canada

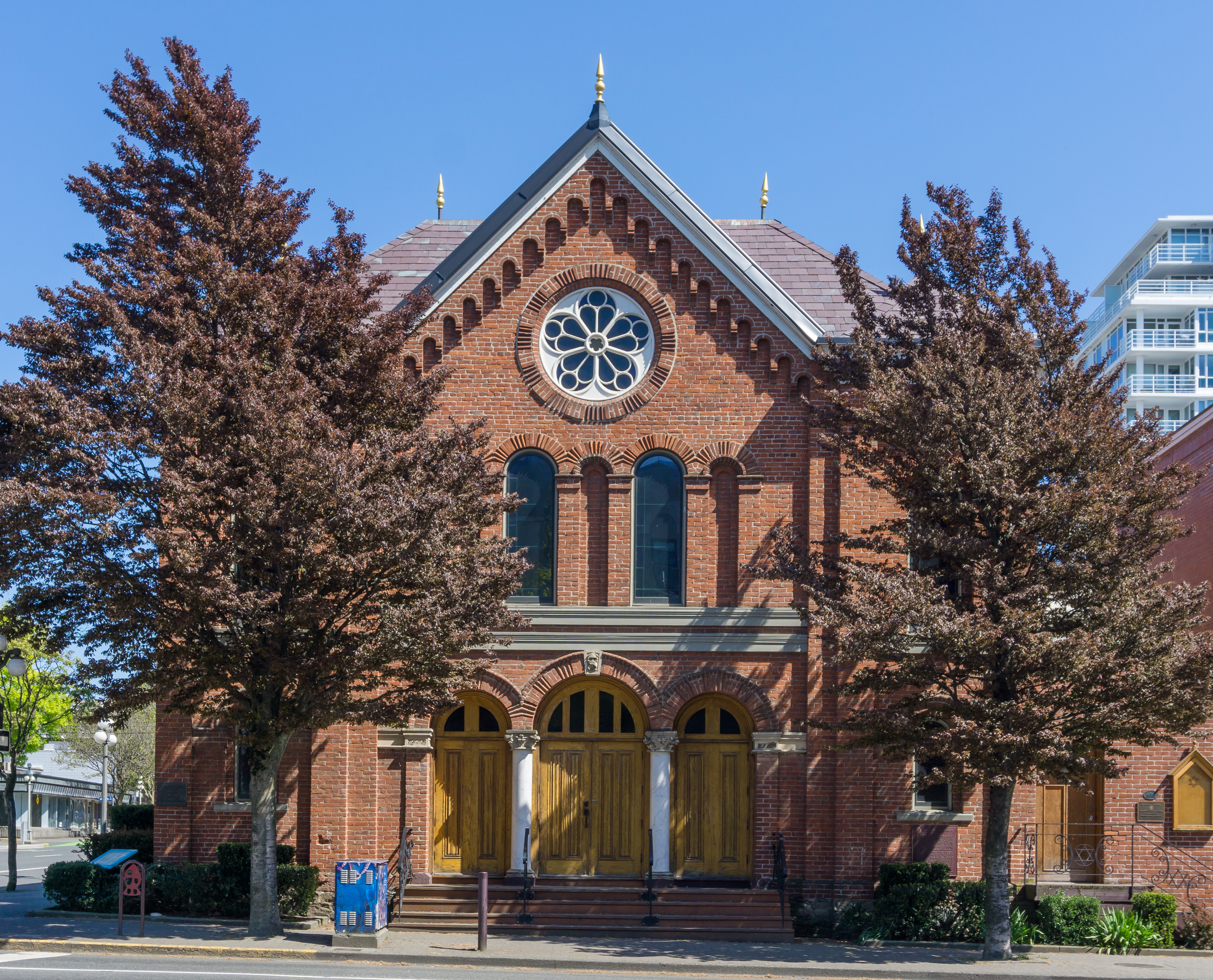
- Congregation Emanu-El

- Location in British Columbia

Religion
- Affiliation: Conservative Judaism
- Rite: Nusach Sefard
- Ecclesiastical or organizational status: Synagogue
- Leadership: Rabbi Eli Herb
- Status: Active

Location
- Location: 1461 Blanshard Street, Victoria, British Columbia V8W 2J3
- Country: Canada
- Interactive map of Congregation Emanu-El
- Administration: United Synagogue of Conservative Judaism
- Coordinates: 48.427326°N 123.361649°W

Architecture
- Architect: Wright & Sanders
- Type: Synagogue
- Style: Romanesque Revival
- Completed: 1863

Website
- congregationemanuel.ca

National Historic Site of Canada
- Official name: Congregation Emanu-el Temple National Historic Site of Canada
- Designated: 1979

Congregation Emanu-El is a Conservative synagogue located in Victoria, British Columbia, Canada. The congregation is affiliated with the United Synagogue of Conservative Judaism.

It is the oldest synagogue building still in use as a synagogue in Canada, and the oldest surviving synagogue on Vancouver Island. It can also boast of being the oldest synagogue building on the west coast of North America.

Founded by 1859 when the cemetery is known to have been dedicated, in 1863 the congregation built the synagogue that is still in use. The building is a National Historic Site of Canada, and has also been designated as a heritage property under the provincial Local Government Act.

== History ==
Designed by Wright & Sanders, architects, the synagogue, located on Blanshard Street at Pandora Avenue beside a twentieth century community building, was built in 1863, during the Victoria building boom caused by the discovery of gold on the mainland nearby in 1858. The first Jews to settle on Vancouver Island came mostly from the United States during the Fraser Canyon Gold Rush. D

The synagogue is said to have been the first building in town to have its cornerstone laid by the recently organized Victoria chapter of the Freemasons. A second cornerstone was laid on the same day by a member of the congregation's Building Committee. A time capsule was ceremoniously buried. It included not only the congregation's constitution, a list of donors to the building fund, some coins, and a copy of the local newspaper, the British Colonist, still publishing today as the Victoria Times Colonist, but the full membership lists of the Germania Sing Verein and French Benevolent Society of Victoria.

The dedication was marked by a procession of benevolent societies of what appears to have been every religion and ethnicity resident in the young city. The marchers in the procession are known to have included not only the Hebrew Benevolent Society, but the French Benevolent Society, the St. Andrew's Society, the Germania Sing Verein (a German Singing Club), and the Fraternity of Ancient, Free and Accepted Masons. The band from HMS Topaze, a 24-gun, Liffey class, Royal Navy frigate, played.

The congregation's cemetery on Cedar Hill Road in Cedar Hill (Greater Victoria), dedicated in 1859.

== Architecture ==
The building is built in the Romanesque Revival style. The facade of the two-story, brick building features a rose window and a corbelled gable. The ceiling of the interior is domed. In the sanctuary, which fills most of the building, seating originally reserved for men surrounds the bimah, and a Torah ark protrudes on the east wall. The sanctuary's second floor consists of a U-shaped gallery originally for women, but now used as an overflow space. The building was renovated in the 1980s, adding on a new wing called the Al & Sylvia Fisher Building, replacing an older wooden structure with a space for educational and cultural activities.

== Notable members ==
- David Kaufman (tailor)
- Morris Moss

== See also ==
- Oldest synagogues in Canada
- History of the Jews in Canada
- Oldest synagogues in the United States
- Jews and Judaism in Vancouver
- List of historic places in Victoria, British Columbia
