= Little Synagogue on the Prairie =

Little Synagogue on the Prairie formerly Montefiore Institute
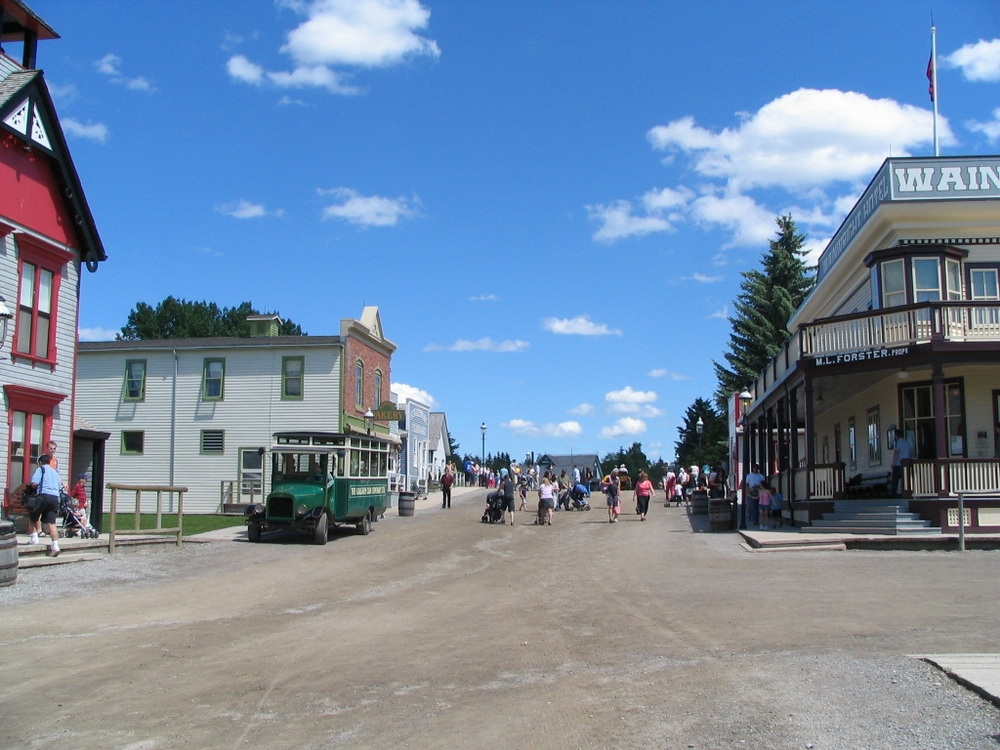
- Heritage Park Historical Village

Religion
- Affiliation: Orthodox Judaism
- Rite: Nusach Sefard
- Leadership: Rabbi
- Status: Museum

Location
- Location: Heritage Park Historical Village in Calgary, Alberta, Canada
- Interactive map of Little Synagogue on the Prairie formerly Montefiore Institute
- Coordinates: 50.98404°N 114.10554°W

Architecture
- Architect: None
- Style: small pioneer wooden synagogue
- Completed: 1913-6

Website
- www.littlesynagogue.ca

The Little Synagogue on the Prairie is a small, wooden synagogue originally built in Sibbald, Alberta, just west of the Alberta-Saskatchewan border. Originally called the Montefiore Institute, it was built in 1913 or 1916 by the Montefiore colony of Jewish immigrants who had settled in Alberta in 1910, named after Sir Moses Montefiore. It is one of the few surviving examples of the small, wooden synagogues that were built by pioneers on the Canadian and American prairie.

In the sanctuary, Torah is read to the congregation from the bimah and the Torah scrolls are stored in the aron kodesh on the east wall. The congregation face towards the east, and Jerusalem, in prayer. The ornamentation features symbols such as Stars of David, and natural forms.

The synagogue was moved to Heritage Park Historical Village in Calgary at a cost of over a million dollars in 2008, becoming the first Jewish house of worship to be housed in a Canadian historic park. About 2,000 people attended the dedication of the synagogue in its new location on June 28, 2009.

With an area of approximately 74 square meters, the building was constructed on the farm of Joseph, Fanny and Dov Chetner to serve the approximately 30 Jewish families as a community center, school, and house of worship. After the colony was abandoned in the 1920s, the Canadian government sold the building to a family around 1937 for $200. It was moved to the town of Hanna, Alberta and served as a two-bedroom house for the same family for almost 70 years.

== See also ==
- Beth Israel Synagogue (Edenbridge, Saskatchewan)
- History of the Jews in Canada
- Oldest synagogues in Canada
