= Beth Israel Synagogue (Edenbridge, Saskatchewan) =

Coordinates: 53.0599°N 104.3439°W

- Interactive map of the Beth Israel Synagogue area

General information
- Architectural style: Carpenter Gothic
- Location: Edenbridge, near Melfort, Saskatchewan, Canada
- Construction started: 1906
- Completed: 1908

Technical details
- Structural system: one-storey wooden frame, with balconies

Beth Israel Synagogue is a historic Carpenter Gothic style Orthodox synagogue located in Edenbridge in the rural municipality of Willow Creek, near Melfort, Saskatchewan, Canada. The Edenbridge Hebrew Colony was founded in 1906 by Jewish immigrants who came from Lithuania via South Africa. Completed in 1908, the synagogue's wooden frame exterior, steep pitched roof and end lancet windows are typical of the plain Carpenter Gothic style buildings built by other religious groups in Saskatchewan and the rest of rural North America during the late 19th and early 20th centuries. The elegant interior, however, reflects the Eastern European roots of the Orthodox congregation. Today Beth Israel is the "oldest surviving synagogue in Saskatchewan."

Beth Israel Synagogue, including its adjacent cemetery, is a municipal heritage site as designated by the Rural Municipality of Willow Creek on September 10, 2003." The plot of land was donated in 1987 to the Saskatchewan Wildlife Federation.

== See also ==
- Little Synagogue on the Prairie
- History of the Jews in Canada
- Oldest synagogues in Canada
