= Oldest synagogues in Canada =

Synagogues may be considered "oldest" based on different criteria, and can be oldest in the sense of oldest surviving building, or oldest in the sense of oldest congregation. Some old synagogue buildings have been in continuous use as synagogues, while others have been converted to other purposes, and others, such as the Touro Synagogue, were shuttered for many decades. Some early established congregations have been in continuous existence, while other early congregations have ceased to exist.

== Oldest congregations ==
- The Spanish and Portuguese Synagogue of Montreal, 1768, is the oldest congregation in Canada, with Jewish settlement in Montreal dating to around 1758/60. Jews had settled in Halifax by 1750, making it the very first Jewish community in what is now Canada, but organized Jewish life there left little by way of records and may have faded away from the 1820s through the 1860s, when the origins of today's community are to be found.

== Oldest buildings ==
- The 1863 building of Congregation Emanu-El (Victoria, British Columbia) is the oldest surviving synagogue building still in use as a synagogue.

== By province ==
=== Alberta ===
- The Montefiore Institute of the 1910 Montefiore colony in Alberta, now known as Little Synagogue on the Prairie in Calgary's Heritage Park Historical Village, is the first Jewish house of worship in a Canadian historical park.

=== Nova Scotia ===
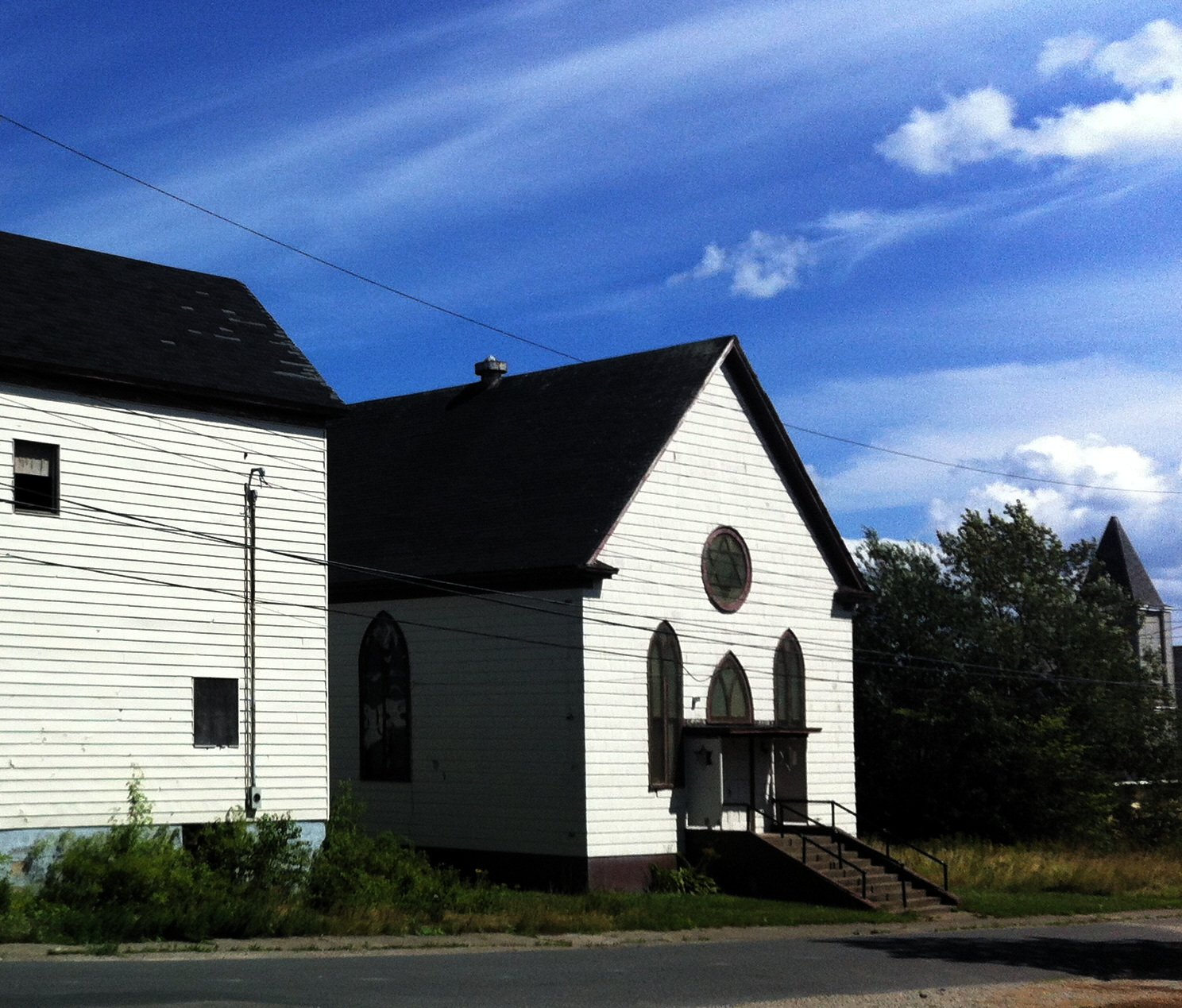
1902 building of Congregation Sons of Israel in Glace Bay.

- The 1902 building of Congregation Sons of Israel of Glace Bay is the oldest synagogue building in Nova Scotia.

=== Ontario ===
- Temple Anshe Sholom (Hamilton): In 1853, the Hebrew Benevolent Society Anshe-Sholom of Hamilton was formed. Religious services began in 1856 and in the next year, a half-acre plot was purchased as a cemetery site. On May 5, 1863, a “Body Corporate and Politic under the name of the Jewish Congregation Anshe-Sholom of Hamilton” was formed listing 19 founding members, mainly of German origin. It is Canada's oldest Reform congregation.
- Toronto Hebrew Congregation - Holy Blossom also began holding services in 1856. It was the first traditional synagogue west of Montreal in Canada, and was one of the first two Jewish congregations in Canada west of Montreal (along with Anshe Sholom in Hamilton). Its current building dates to 1938.
- Knesseth Israel was founded in 1909 and its shul, completed in 1913, in Toronto's Junction neighbourhood is the city's oldest synagogue building still in operation.
- United Brothers Jewish Synagogue, designed by Cecil Burgess, Rideau Street near Chapel Street, Ottawa 1912; demolished c. 1960.
- The First Russian Congregation of Rodfei Sholem Anshei Kiev was founded in 1914 and its Kiever Synagogue was built in 1927 on the edge of Toronto's Kensington Market.
- Beth Israel Anshei Minsk congregation was founded in 1912 in Toronto's Kensington Market. Its shul was completed in 1930.
- The First Narayever Congregation was founded in 1914. Its current shul on Brunswick Avenue was acquired in 1940.
- The Beach Hebrew Institute in Toronto's east end was founded in 1919. Its shul was originally constructed in 1895 as a Baptist church and was acquired by the congregation in 1919. In 1926, alterations were made to the interior and exterior of the building, including the construction of a new facade.
- Machzikey Hadas Jewish Synagogue, designed by Werner Edgar Noffke, King Edward Avenue at Murray Street, Ottawa 1926-27

=== Quebec ===
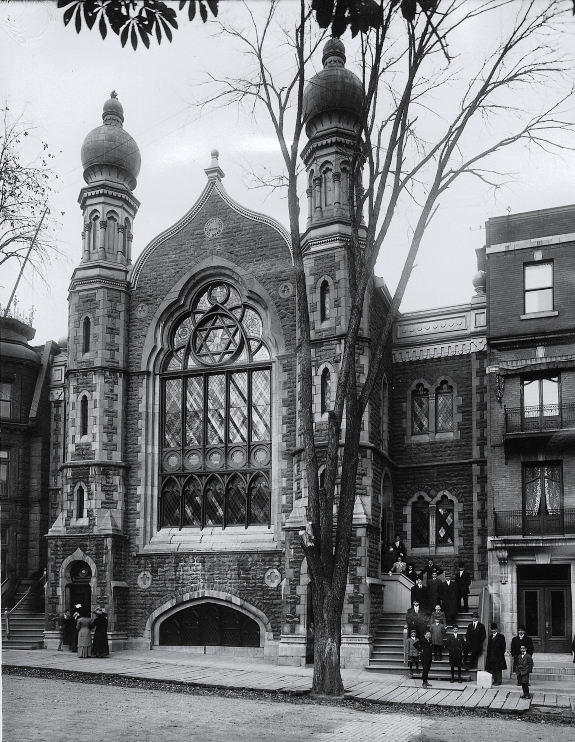
The original Shaar Hashomayim shul at 59 McGill College Avenue, circa 1910.

- The Spanish and Portuguese Synagogue of Montreal, dating from 1760 and formally established in 1768, is the oldest congregation in Canada and therefore Quebec. The congregation is now housed in its fourth premises in the Snowdon-Côte-des-Neiges area of Montreal (since 1947).
- Congregation Shaar Hashomayim was founded in 1846. It is the oldest and largest traditional Ashkenazi congregation in Canada. The current synagogue building, situated in Westmount, close to downtown Montreal, was dedicated in 1922.
- The Bagg Street Shul is the oldest Quebec congregation that is still operating in its original building. Formed in 1906, the congregation has been at the corner of Clark Street and Bagg, Montreal, since 1921.
- Congregation Beth Israel Ohev Sholem is the oldest synagogue in Québec City, founded in 1852.

=== Saskatchewan ===
- The 1906 building of Beth Israel Synagogue (Edenbridge, Saskatchewan) is probably the oldest surviving synagogue building in the province.

== By movement ==
- Reform: Temple Emanu-El-Beth Sholom (Westmount, Quebec)

== See also ==
- Oldest synagogues in the world
- Oldest synagogues in the United States
- Oldest synagogues in the United Kingdom
- History of the Jews in Canada
