= Morris Moss =

Canadian politician

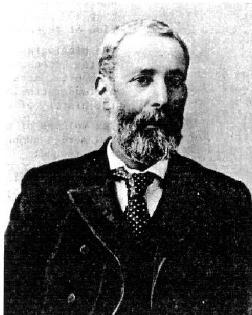
- Born: May 31, 1842; London, England
- Died: 1896 (aged 53–54); Denver, Colorado, US
- Known for: Pioneering in the Pacific Northwest

Morris Moss (May 31, 1842 – 1896) was a British Columbian colonist and Canadian pioneer.

== Early life ==
Morris Moss was born on May 31, 1842, to a well-off Jewish family in London, England. He was educated at University College and at age nineteen he travelled to Victoria, by way of Panama and San Francisco, to act as that city's agent of Liebes and Co., well-known fur traders at the time. However, looking for more adventure, Moss followed in the steps of the pioneer Sir Alexander Mackenzie and set up a trading post at Bella Coola, where Mackenzie had reached overland from Canada in 1793. Smallpox had killed 90% of the population near Bella Coola, but Moss persisted and ran pack trains through to the miners at Barkerville and other gold-mining boomtowns around Williams Creek. Unlike many white pioneers, Moss respected the customs of the natives and did not marry any of their women.

== Pioneering days ==
Back in Victoria, Moss met up with fellow fur trader and Governor James Douglas. Moss was appointed Government Agent for the Northwest Coast and Justice of the Peace. However, while sailing on the West Coast he became shipwrecked and was marooned on an island for three months. During this time, he was held prisoner by the local Indian tribe but was rescued by the Bella Coola Indians whom he had befriended. Unfortunately, his trading post had fallen apart during his absence, and he returned to Victoria broke.

In 1864 Alfred Waddington's road-building crew were killed by the local Chilcotin Indians in the Great Canyon of the Homathko, starting the Chilcotin War. Governor Frederick Seymour called upon Moss to serve as an advisor on Indians to the Legislative Council of British Columbia, and after his time in that position acted as Indian Agent and Deputy Collector of Customs for the Northwest Coast. In 1867 he returned to his trading, setting up a post at Bella Bella and in 1869 set one up in the Queen Charlotte Islands.

In the early 1870s Moss developed an interest in sealing and set up his own company. However, his two schooners were seized by the United States government, who claimed that their country had a monopoly over sealing in the area, creating an international incident. However, this claim of a monopoly was overturned by the Bering Sea Arbitration, signed in Paris, and Moss received full damages for the seizures. This incident almost sparked a war between the United States and Canada.

== Later life ==
After the sealing incident Moss returned to Victoria to engage in social life there. He became president of his synagogue, Congregation Emanu-El (Victoria, British Columbia) and the Victoria Club. In 1883 Moss married Hattie Bornstein, a 22-year-old from a prominent fur trading family. This became the talk of the town as Hattie was young enough to be his daughter. The next year, their son Alexander was born, but when his son was eight years old Morris left to inspect a prospecting claim in Washington state. His family never saw him again and in 1896 word reached them of his death in Denver, Colorado.
