= List of Orthodox Jewish communities in Canada =

These communities in Canada contain significant Orthodox Jewish populations:

== Manitoba ==
- Tuxedo, Winnipeg, Manitoba
- River Heights, Winnipeg, Manitoba
- Charleswood, Winnipeg, Manitoba

== Ontario ==
- Bathurst Street, Toronto, Ontario
- Glen Park, Toronto, Ontario
- Ledbury Park, Toronto, Ontario
- Lawrence Manor, Toronto, Ontario
- Clanton Park, Toronto, Ontario
- Thornhill, Ontario

== Quebec ==
- Montreal, Quebec
- Outremont, Quebec
- Westmount, Quebec
- Hampstead, Quebec
- Côte-Saint-Luc, Quebec
- Kiryas Tosh, Boisbriand, Quebec
