= David Kaufman (tailor) =

David Kaufman (June 18, 1833 – August 23, 1912) was an early Jewish pioneer in Seattle, Washington. He established many synagogues and supported Jewish religious life. A streetcar stop in Seattle is named after him.

== Early life ==
David Kaufman was born to Salomon Kaufman and Sarah Dwore Israel in Fordon, Prussia on June 13, 1833. His sister, Rosa (b. 1839) was an early Jewish immigrant to Sonora, California.

== Arrival in America ==
Kaufman arrived in the United States and settled in San Francisco in 1858, originally working as a clothes renovator within the city's Jewish community. In 1859, he married his childhood sweetheart, Huldah Harris, and they moved to Victoria, British Columbia. In Victoria, he helped establish the Congregation Emanu-El. He was elected as "messenger" and earned $10 a month for his position.

The couple moved to Seattle with Harris's mother in 1869. In Seattle, he worked as a tailor and shoe merchant. He was active in the local Jewish community. His daughter, Sara, was the first Jewish child born in Seattle. He helped find Ohaveth Sholum Congregation, the first synagogue in Seattle. The synagogue used Reform influences, such as Reform prayerbooks, mixed-gender seating, and the usage of both Hebrew and English. The synagogue purchased rights to a cemetery in 1889. Kaufman bought a torah scroll from New York City in 1891 and it became the synagogue's scroll. Ohaveth Sholum shut down in 1895 due to financial difficulties and different preferences from its members.

After the closing of Ohaveth Sholum, Temple De Hirsch Sinai was built in its place. Named after Maurice de Hirsch, Kaufman also helped establish this synagogue and donated the torah scroll to the new synagogue. That torah scroll is still is in use to this day.

Kaufman was well known throughout Seattle and relatively wealthy, buying many plots of land. A streetcar stop in the city's Green Lake neighborhood was named "Kaufman Station" for him.

== Death ==
Kaufman died on August 24, 1912, at his home in Seattle.
