= Edenbridge, Saskatchewan =

- Interactive map of Edenbridge, Saskatchewan
- Coordinates: 53.055°N 104.344°W
- Country: Canada
- Province: Saskatchewan
- Rural municipality: Rural Municipality of Willow Creek No. 458
- Area codes: 306 and 639

Edenbridge was a Jewish farming settlement northeast of Melfort, Saskatchewan. Its first residents came from Lithuania via South Africa. The name is an Anglicization of Yid'n Bridge (Jews' Bridge), for a nearby bridge over the Carrot River.

At its peak the Edenbridge Hebrew Colony had about 170 inhabitants, a post office, a school, and a synagogue; Beth Israel Synagogue. The settlement is now abandoned.

== See also ==
- Block settlement§Jewish
- History of the Jews in Canada
- Jewish Colonies in Canada
