= Congregation Beth Israel Ohev Sholem =

Congregation Beth Israel Ohev Sholem (CBIOS)

Religion
- Affiliation: Judaism
- Status: Active

Location
- Location: 1251, avenue de Mérici; Quebec City, Quebec; G1S 3H8
- Interactive map of Congregation Beth Israel Ohev Sholem (CBIOS)
- Coordinates: 46.7933°N 71.2360°W

Architecture
- Completed: 1944

Website
- cbios.ca

Congregation Beth Israel Ohev Sholem is a synagogue and community center located in the district of Sillery in Quebec City, Quebec, Canada.

== History ==
The first synagogue in Quebec City was opened in 1852, at the corner of rue Saint-Jean and rue Saint-Augustin. This was the fourth synagogue in Canada.

The synagogue Baïs Israël was formed when the small synagogue located at 14 rue Henderson (a street which was closed in 1986) became too cramped in size. Jewish community members Mayer Vineberg and Louis Klineberg obtained the legal authorization to establish Baïs Israël on November 9, 1897. It was located at 164 rue Grant (this street was renamed rue Monseigneur-Gauvreau, in 1937). Baïs Israël remained on rue Grant until 1908. The previous year, in 1907, the community obtained land at 25 rue Sainte-Marguerite (this street was renamed rue Saint-Laurent, in 1915), for a new synagogue, as well as a school, l'Hebrew Hall. In 1909, the corporation of la congréation Baïs Israël was formed.

As the city's Jewish population grew relatively rapidly during this time period, the community established a second synagogue, Ohev Sholom, in 1907, at 51 rue de Fossés (this street later became boulevard Charest). After Baïs Israël completed a building renovation between 1927 and 1928, it merged with Ohev Sholom, becoming Baïs Israël Ohev Sholom Congregation. The combined congregation utilized the rue Sainte-Marguerite synagogue until 1944.

In early 1943, the congregation acquired land for a synagogue and school, located at 2 rue Crémazie Est, at the intersection of avenue de Salaberry. Anti-semitic sentiments were high in Quebec, fuelled by divisions around World War II, and the construction of a synagogue was opposed by some conservative Catholics who protested and attempted to have the building expropriated. The protests culminated in an arson attack on the new building on May 20, 1944, prior to the synagogue being inaugurated.

After Quebec City's Jewish population dwindled in size, the community became too small to support this large building, and it was converted into a theater, in 1984. Since 1990, this building houses the Théâtre Périscope. In 1984, Beth Israel Ohev Sholom moved to a small suburban bungalow.
