= List of synagogues in Canada =

A partial list of synagogues in Canada:

== Alberta ==
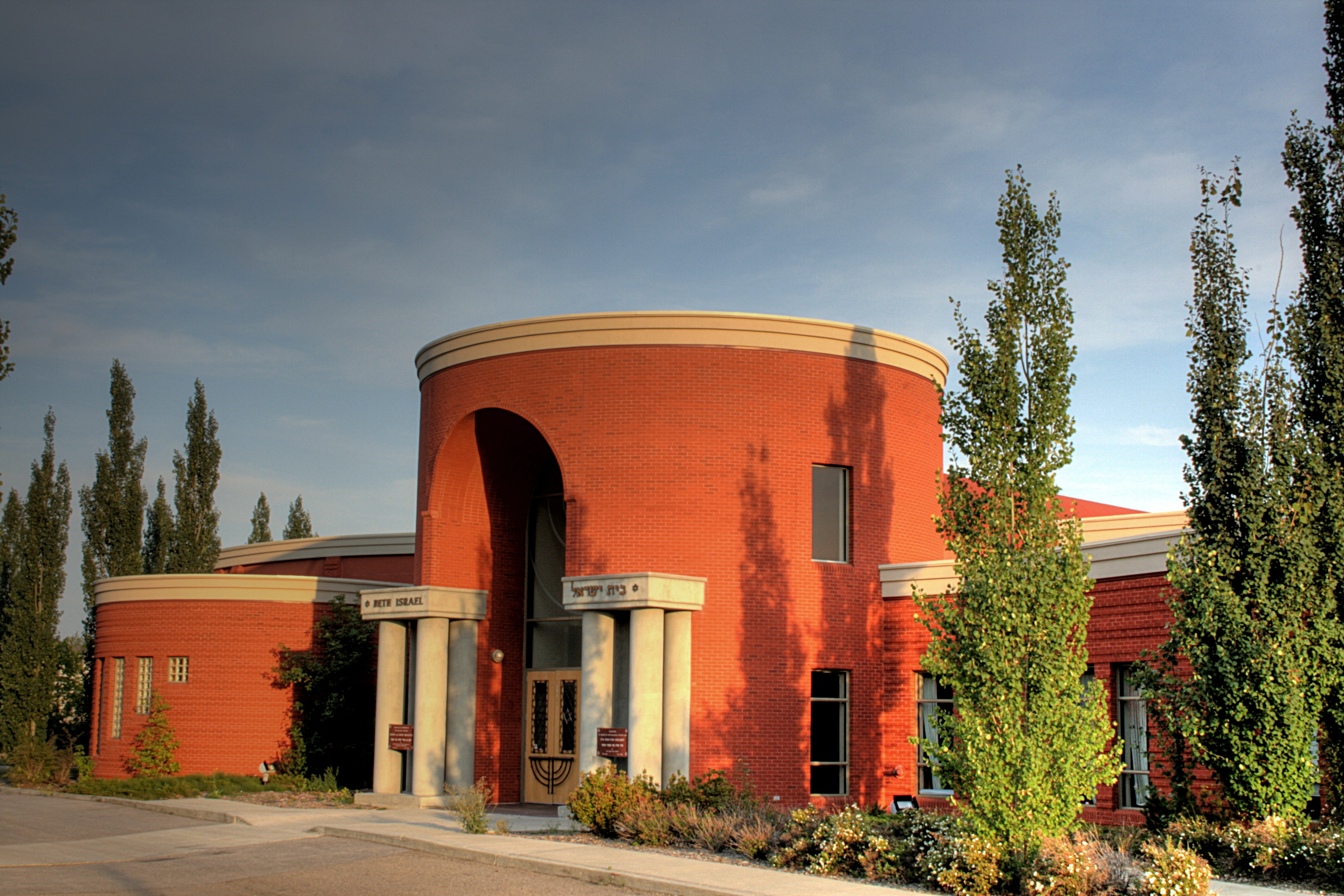
Beth Israel, Edmonton

=== Calgary ===
- Beth Tzedec Congregation, Calgary (Conservative)
- Chabad Lubavitch of Alberta
- House of Jacob (Modern Orthodox)
- Kehilat Shalom
- Temple Bnai Tikvah (Reform)

=== Edmonton ===
- Beth Israel Synagogue, Edmonton
- Beth Shalom Synagogue
- Chabad Lubavitch of Edmonton
- Temple Beth Ora Synagogue (Reform)

=== Hanna ===
- Little Synagogue on the Prairie, Hanna

== British Columbia ==
=== Richmond ===
- Beth Tikvah Congregation, Richmond
- Chabad of Richmond
- Etz Chaim Congregation
- Young Israel of Richmond

=== Surrey ===
- Center for Judaism of Fraser Valley, Surrey

=== Vancouver ===
- Ahavat Olam Congregation, Vancouver
- Chabad of Vancouver
- Congregation Beth Hamidrash
- Congregation Beth Israel
- Congregation Har El
- Congregation Beth Israel
- Congregation Schara Tzedeck
- Jewish Synagogue (1914), Melville Street
- Lubavitch of British Columbia
- Or Shalom Synagogue
- Pacific Torah Institute
- Temple Sholom (Reform)
- The Ohel Ya'akov Community Kollel

=== Victoria ===
- Aish Ha'Torah, (Victoria)
- Congregation Emanu-El
- Kolot Mayim Temple (Reform)
- Victoria Society for Humanistic Judaism

== Manitoba ==
=== Winnipeg ===
- Adas Yeshurun Herzlia Congregation, Winnipeg
- Ashkenazi Synagogue
- Chabad Lubavitch of Winnipeg
- Chavurat Tefilah Fellowship of Prayer
- Chevra Mishnayes Synagogue
- Congregation Etz Chayim
- Congregation Shir Tikvah (Dissolved)
- Shaarey Zedek Synagogue (Winnipeg)
- Talmud Torah Beth Jacob Synagogue
- Temple Shalom (Reform)

== New Brunswick ==
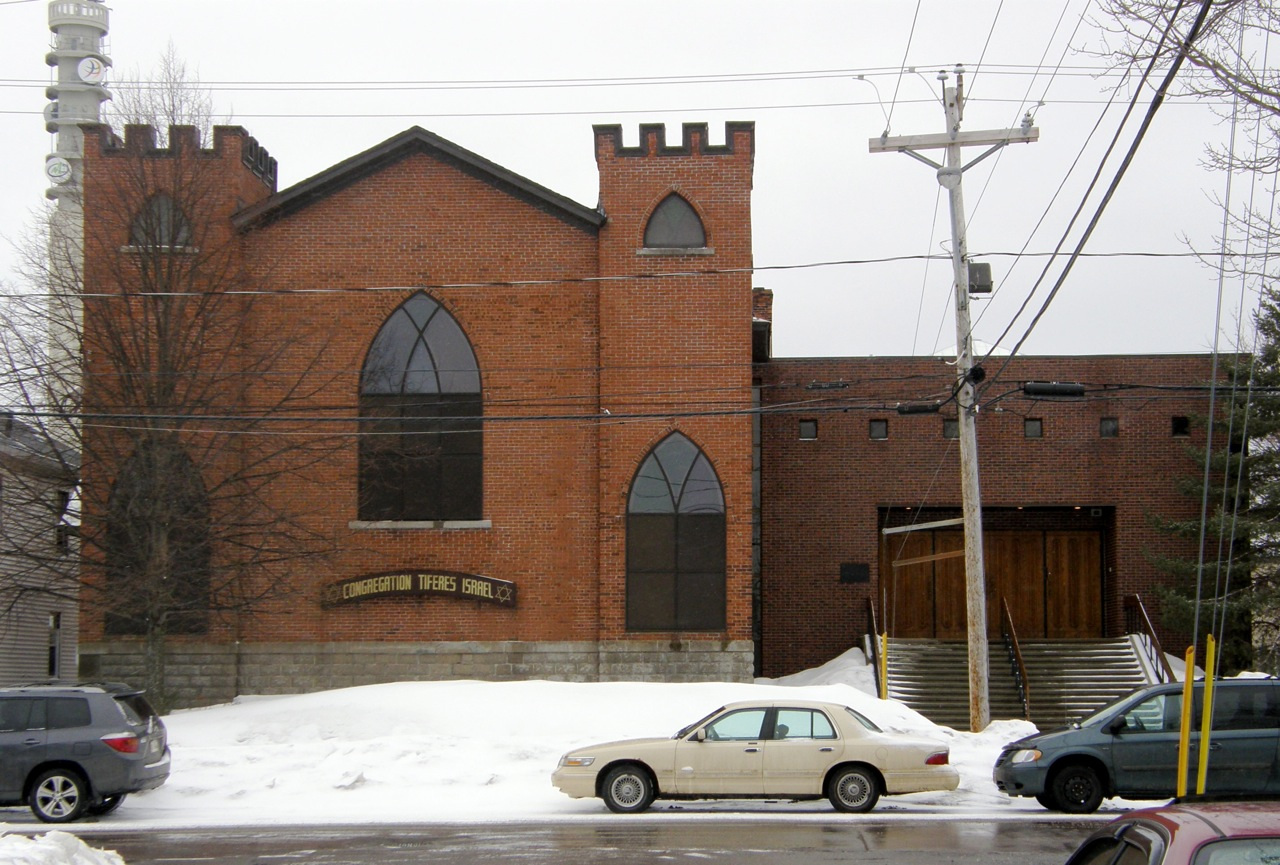
Congregation Tiferes Israel, Moncton, New Brunswick

=== Fredericton ===
- Sgoolai Israel Synagogue, Fredericton

=== Moncton ===
- Tiferes Israel Synagogue, Moncton

=== Saint John ===
- Shaarei Zedek Synagogue, Saint John

== Newfoundland and Labrador ==
=== St. John's ===
- Beth El Synagogue, St. John's
- Chabad of Newfoundland

== Nova Scotia ==
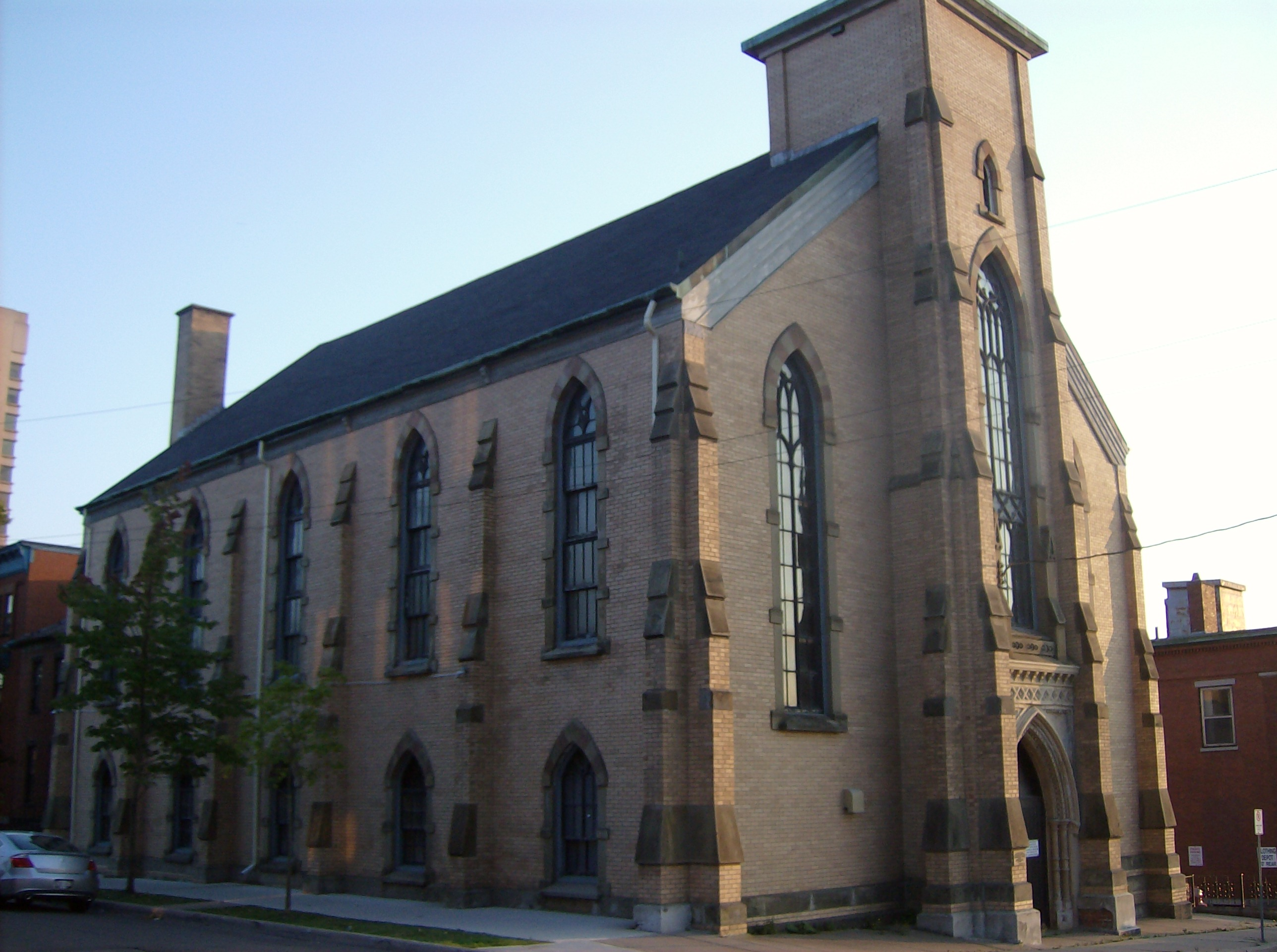
Old Synagogue - vacated - Saint John, New Brunswick.

=== Halifax ===
- Beth Israel Synagogue, Halifax
- Shaar Shalom Synagogue

=== Sydney ===
- Temple Sons of Israel Synagogue, Sydney

== Ontario ==
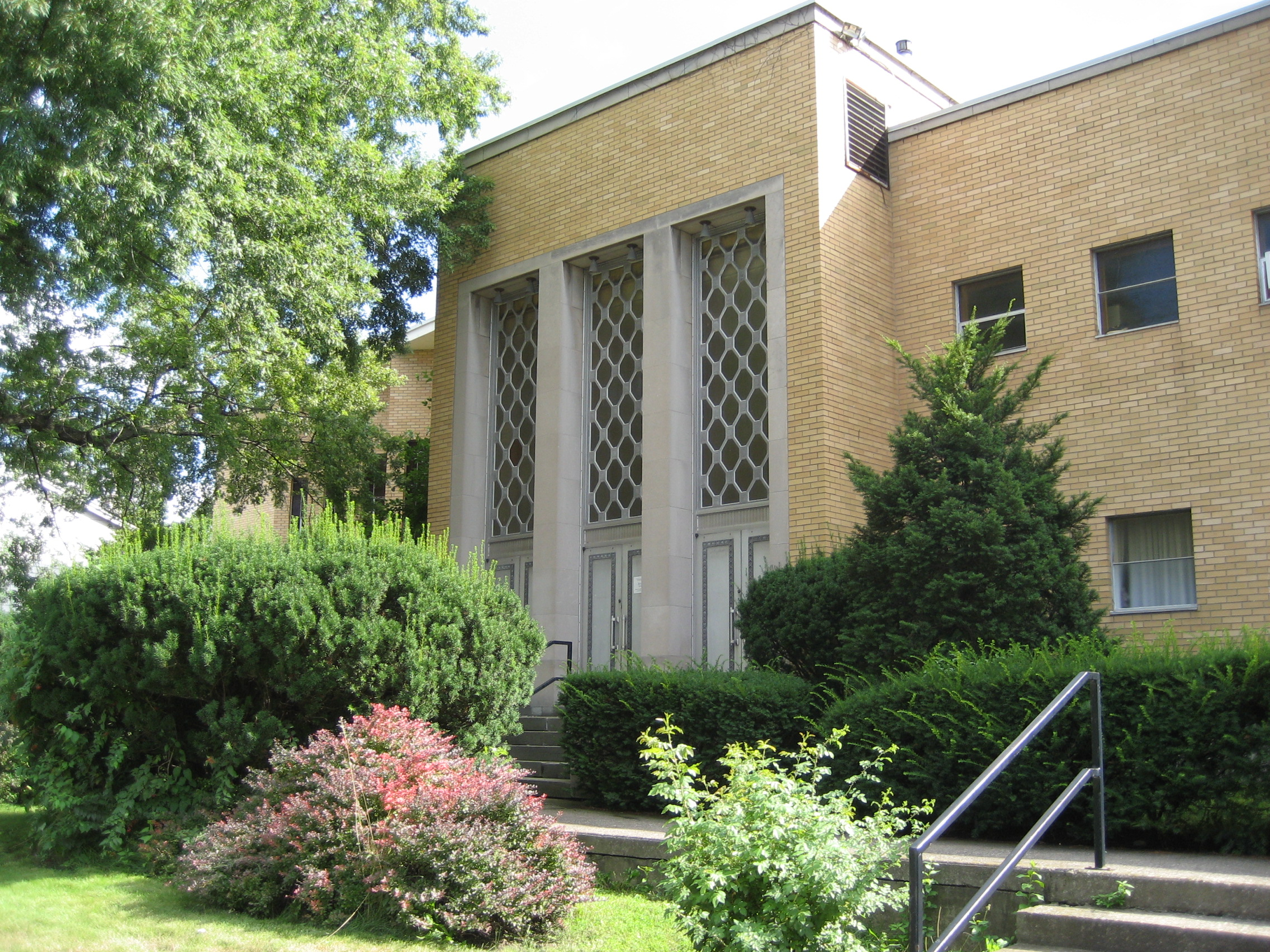
Congregation Beth Jacob Aberdeen, Aberdeen Avenue West, Hamilton

=== Barrie ===
- Am Shalom Reform Congregation
- Chabad Jewish Centre of Barrie

=== Belleville ===
- Sons of Jacob Synagogue, Belleville (Conservative)

=== Hamilton ===
- Adas Israel Synagogue, Hamilton
- Anshe Sholom Congregation (Reform)
- Beth Jacob Synagogue
- Chabad Lubavitch of Hamilton

=== Kingston ===
- Beth Israel Congregation
- Chabad Centre of Kingston
- Congregation Iyr HaMelech, Kingston (Reform)

=== Kitchener ===
- Congregation Beth Jacob, Kitchener

=== Niagara Falls ===
- Congregation Bnai Tikvah, Niagara Falls

=== North Bay ===
- Sons of Jacob Congregation, North Bay

=== London ===
- Beth Tefilah Synagogue, London
- Chabad House at University of Western Ontario
- Or Shalom Congregation
- Temple Israel of London (Reform)

=== Ottawa ===
- Adath Shalom Congregation, Ottawa
- Beit Tikvah of Ottawa
- Chabad-Lubavitch of Ottawa
- Chabad of Centrepointe
- Chabad of Kanata
- Finkelstein Chabad Jewish Centre
- Glebe Shul
- Kehillat Beth Israel
- Congregation Machzikei Hadas
- Or Haneshamah – Ottawa's Reconstructionist Community
- Orthodox Community Ohev Yisroel
- Ottawa Torah Center Chabad
- Temple Israel (Reform)
- Young Israel of Ottawa

=== Owen Sound ===
- Beth Ezekiel Congregation, Owen Sound

=== Peterborough ===
- Beth Israel Synagogue, Peterborough

=== Sault Ste. Marie ===
- Congregation Beth Jacob, Sault Ste. Marie

=== Saint Catharines ===
- Congregation B'nai Israel, St. Catharines

=== Sudbury ===
- Shaar Hashomayim Congregation, Sudbury

=== Thunder Bay ===
- Shaarey Shomayim Congregation, Thunder Bay

=== Waterloo ===
- Chabad of Waterloo
- Temple Shalom, Waterloo (Reform)

=== Windsor ===
- Congregation Beth El, Windsor (Reform)
- Congregation Shaarey Zedek
- Congregation Shaar Hashomayim (1928-9) Giles Boulevard East, designed by A. Stuart Allaster

== Prince Edward Island ==
=== Charlottetown ===
There is no synagogue in Prince Edward Island.

== Quebec ==
=== Boisbriand ===
- Kiryas Tosh, Boisbriand

=== Côte Saint-Luc ===
- Beth Chabad Cote St. Luc, Côte-Saint-Luc
- Beth Israel Beth Aaron Congregation
- Beth Zion Congregation Synagogue
- Congrégation Chouva Israël
- Congrégation Sepharade Or Hahayim
- Congregation Tifereth Beth David Jerusalem
- Communauté Sépharade Beth Rambam

=== Dollard-des-Ormeaux ===
- Congregation Beth Tikvah, Dollard-des-Ormeaux
- Jewish Center Mazal Gutnick
- Synagogue Or Shalom

=== Hampstead ===
- Adath Israel Poale Tzedek - Anshei Ozeroff Congregation, Hampstead
- Congregation Dorshei Emet (Reconstructionist)
- Montreal Torah Center - Bais Menachem Chabad Lubavitch

=== Montreal ===
- Adath Israel
- Congrégation Ahavath Israël
- Chabad of the Town Beit Ezra Community Center
- Beit Hillel Congregation, Snowdon
- Congregation Beth Ora
- Bagg Street Shul
- Temple Emanu-El-Beth Sholom
- Chabad House Peel
- Chevra Kadisha B'Nai Jacob Synagogue
- Congregation Machzikei Torah of Montreal
- Maghen Abraham
- Chabad NDG - Rohr Jewish Centre
- Nétivot Haïm
- Communauté Sépharade Hekhal Shalom, Saint-Laurent
- Congrégation Sepharade Maghen-David
- Communauté Sepharade Petah Tikvah de Ville Saint Laurent
- Shaare Zedek
- Shaare Zion Congregation
- Congregation Shomrim Laboker
- Spanish and Portuguese Synagogue
- Congregation Toldos Yaakov Yosef of Skver
- Chabad Ville Saint Laurent and Bois Franc
- Congregation Yetev Lev Satmar
- Young Israel of Montreal
- Chabad Zichron Kedoshim

=== Mount Royal ===
- Agudath Israel of Montreal, Mount Royal
- Congregation First Mesifta of Canada

=== La Prairie ===
- Communauté juive de la Rive-Sud, La Prairie

=== Laval ===
- Centre Sépharade de Torah, Laval
- Chevra Mishnais Jacob Joseph
- Congregation Shaar Shalom
- Young Israel of Chomedey, Chomedey

=== Quebec City ===
- Congregation Beth Israel Ohev Sholem, Quebec City
- Communauté juive de la ville de Quebec

=== Sainte-Agathe-des-Monts ===
- Congregation House of Israel, Sainte-Agathe-des-Monts

=== Westmount ===
- Chabad of Westmount, Westmount
- Congregation Shaar Hashomayim
- Temple Emanu-El-Beth Sholom

== Saskatchewan ==
=== Edenbridge ===
- Beth Israel Synagogue (Edenbridge)

=== Regina ===
- Beth Jacob Synagogue, Regina
- Chabad Jewish Centre of Regina

=== Saskatoon ===
- Chabad Jewish Centre of Saskatoon, Saskatoon
- Congregation Agudas Israel - Jewish Community Centre
- Congregation Shir Chadash

== See also ==
- List of Jewish communities in North America
