= Charles Bender (rabbi) =

British-Canadian rabbi (1896–1993)

Rabbi Charles Bender

Personal life
- Born: April 1, 1896 London, England, United Kingdom
- Died: April 23, 1993 (aged 97) Montreal, Quebec, Canada
- Buried: Baron de Hirsch Cemetery

Religious life
- Religion: Judaism
- Synagogue: Spanish and Portuguese Synagogue (1928–1940); Adath Israel Congregation (1940–1993)

Charles Bender (Hebrew: יהושע בן יעקב אהרן בנדר; April 1, 1896 – April 23, 1993) was a British-Canadian rabbi. He was spiritual leader of the Spanish and Portuguese Synagogue from 1928 to 1940, and of the Adath Israel Congregation from 1940 until his retirement in 1969, remaining rabbi emeritus at the latter institution until his death. He also served as founding president of the Montreal Board of Jewish Ministers, editor of the Canadian Jewish Chronicle, dean of the Jewish Teachers' Seminary of Montreal, and national chairman of the Jewish National Fund in Canada.

== Early life ==
Charles Bender was born in London to Yetta Beila (née Simbalist; d. 1939) and Jacob Bender (d. 1929). His father came from a relatively well-off family from Poland, and worked as a wood-carver and cabinet maker.

As a child Bender spent six months with his family at a hakhshara colony in Margo Chiflik, Cyprus, where his brother Joseph died of malaria. The family returned to England in 1900, settling in Liverpool. He attended Pleasant Street Primary School and Hebrew Higher Grade School.

== Career ==
Bender was first hired as choirmaster of the Liverpool Old Hebrew Congregation at the age of 19. In 1917 he became cantor of Temple Beth El, a synagogue in Rochester, New York. While in that city, he served as director for the Rochester Hebrew schools and president of the Rochester Hebrew Library. He also emerged as a prominent figure in the Zionist movement in the eastern United States, becoming president of Keren Hayesod and chairman for the United Palestine Appeal in New York State.

In November 1928, Bender accepted a call to become rabbi of the Spanish and Portuguese Synagogue in Montreal, the oldest synagogue in Canada.

After Hitler's rise to power in 1933, Bender helped establish and served as chairman of the German-Jewish Relief Fund, a precursor to the re-established Canadian Jewish Congress affiliated with the American Joint Distribution Committee. Soon after, he published the pamphlet From Luther to Hitler: Why Anti-Semitism Is Indigenous to the German People against Hitlerism. He later served as Jewish Chaplain to the Royal Canadian Air Force during the Second World War.

Bender received the King George VI Coronation Medal in 1937. During the 1939 royal tour of Canada, he was invited to meet King George VI and Queen Elizabeth.

The Spanish and Portuguese synagogue faced financial difficulties during the Great Depression, and Bender assumed multiple roles within the synagogue, including cantor, shammash, teacher, and fundraiser. Unable to pay Bender a fully salary, in 1939 the synagogue allowed him to serve as advising rabbi to the newly formed Adath Israel Congregation in Outremont. He left the Spanish and Portuguese to become full-time rabbi at Adath Israel in 1940, but continued to assist the former in various capacities for several more years.

Bender helped found the Adath Israel School in 1941, now the Hebrew Academy of Montreal. He became founding president of the Montreal Board of Jewish Ministers in 1946.

== Communal work ==
Charles Bender served as National Chairman of the Jewish National Fund for a decade and was later elected honorary president in Canada. In 1963, the Jewish National Fund honoured him by dedicating the "Rabbi Charles Bender Forest" in Ein Karem, near Jerusalem.
