= Lisa Grushcow =

Canadian Reform rabbi (born 1974)

Personal life
- Born: 1974 (age 51–52) Ottawa, Ontario, Canada
- Notable work(s): Writing the Wayward Wife (2006); The Sacred Encounter (ed., 2014)
- Education: McGill University (BA); Balliol College, Oxford (MPhil, DPhil)

Religious life
- Religion: Judaism
- Denomination: Reform Judaism

Jewish leader
- Predecessor: Leigh Lerner
- Position: Senior rabbi
- Synagogue: Temple Emanu-El-Beth Sholom, Westmount
- Began: 2012
- Semikhah: Hebrew Union College – Jewish Institute of Religion, 2003

Lisa J. Grushcow (born 1974) is a Canadian Reform rabbi and scholar of rabbinic literature. Since 2012 she has been senior rabbi of Temple Emanu-El-Beth Sholom in Westmount, Montreal's only Reform congregation. She was the first woman to lead the congregation and, at the time of her appointment, the first woman to serve as senior rabbi of any Canadian congregation of more than 1,000 member families. The New York Times described her in 2019 as the first openly gay rabbi of a large synagogue in Canada.

A Rhodes Scholar, Grushcow earned a doctorate at the University of Oxford and is the author of Writing the Wayward Wife: Rabbinic Interpretations of Sotah (2006) and the editor of The Sacred Encounter: Jewish Perspectives on Sexuality (2014). She has been active in interfaith work in Montreal, in opposition to Quebec government proposals to restrict religious symbols, in the private sponsorship of Syrian refugees, and in public discussion of antisemitism in Canada after 2023.

== Early life and education ==
Grushcow was born in Ottawa in 1974; her family moved to Toronto when she was two. Her father, who trained as an engineer, ran a software business, and her mother worked in management consulting. She was raised in the Conservative movement and attended Beth Tikvah Synagogue in Toronto.

She studied at McGill University in Montreal, majoring in political science with a minor in Jewish studies, and graduated with a Bachelor of Arts in 1996. While at McGill she attended the Reconstructionist congregation Dorshei Emet. She was elected the 1996 Rhodes Scholar for Quebec and went up to Balliol College, Oxford, where she completed a Master of Philosophy in Judaism and Christianity in the Greco-Roman world, followed by a DPhil in theology.

Grushcow had intended to train for the rabbinate in the Conservative movement. At Oxford she fell in love with a woman she had met at a conference, and because the Conservative seminary she planned to attend did not then ordain openly gay rabbis, she joined the Reform movement instead, a change she made while still in England. She studied at Hebrew Union College – Jewish Institute of Religion in New York City as a Wexner Graduate Fellow and was ordained there in 2003.

== Scholarship ==
Grushcow's academic research concerns early rabbinic Judaism and its relationship with early Christianity. Her monograph Writing the Wayward Wife: Rabbinic Interpretations of Sotah was published by Brill in 2006 as volume 62 of its series Ancient Judaism and Early Christianity. It examines how the tannaitic and amoraic sources interpret the ritual of the sotah, the wife suspected of adultery in Numbers 5:11–31. Reviewing the book in Lilith, Shira Fischer summarized Grushcow's argument that the rabbis' concerns about the ritual, although they affect women, are not primarily about women, and identified two recurring themes in the texts: close attention to legal detail and reluctance to presume guilt. Fischer found the book readable for an academic study and singled out its discussion of how the ritual came to be discontinued.

In 2014 Grushcow edited The Sacred Encounter: Jewish Perspectives on Sexuality for the Central Conference of American Rabbis (CCAR) Press, a collection intended to present Judaism and sexuality to lay readers. She also contributed to The Torah: A Women's Commentary and has written for the Reform movement's Ten Minutes of Torah series.

== Rabbinic career ==
=== Congregation Rodeph Sholom, New York ===
From 2003 to 2012 Grushcow served at Congregation Rodeph Sholom, a Reform synagogue of some 1,600 families on Manhattan's Upper West Side, first as associate rabbi and later as senior associate rabbi. She officiated at hundreds of b'nai mitzvah and weddings, led a study group for Jewish therapists, and counselled members working in finance after the 2008 financial crisis. With her then spouse she lobbied the New York State Legislature for the legalization of same-sex marriage, which was enacted in June 2011 by the Marriage Equality Act.

=== Temple Emanu-El-Beth Sholom, Montreal ===
Temple Emanu-El-Beth Sholom announced Grushcow's appointment as senior rabbi on December 1, 2011, and she took up the post on July 1, 2012, succeeding Rabbi Leigh Lerner, who retired after 23 years. The congregation then had just over 1,000 member families. In an interview before her arrival she said that she did not want to be regarded "as a female rabbi or a gay rabbi" and that, as Montreal's only Reform congregation, the temple was in a position "to open doors to those who do not have a place elsewhere in the community". In 2015 The Forward included her in its list of America's most inspiring rabbis, with a tribute by Romy Shiller that credited her with making the temple more welcoming to people with disabilities. By 2019 she was co-president of the inter-denominational Montreal Board of Rabbis.

From the mid-2010s Grushcow co-wrote "Rabbi to Rabbi", a paired opinion column in The Canadian Jewish News, with the Orthodox rabbi N. Daniel Korobkin of Toronto; the column set out their differing positions on questions such as the Syrian refugee crisis, medical assistance in dying, liberal Judaism's relationship with Israel, and Jewish dating. Writing in June 2016, as Parliament debated legislation on medical assistance in dying, she said she was "deeply concerned about the slippery slope" the legislation created and called for accessible palliative care and safeguards, but argued that there was no unanimous Jewish position and that she would be present for congregants who chose physician-assisted death.

== Public engagement ==
=== Interfaith work and Quebec secularism laws ===
Grushcow has publicly opposed Quebec government proposals to restrict religious symbols. In October 2013 Temple Emanu-El-Beth Sholom hosted a panel discussion on the proposed Quebec Charter of Values, and on March 9, 2014, she was one of two rabbis to address an interfaith rally of some 700 people against the charter (Bill 60) at Shaare Zedek Congregation, telling the audience that Judaism regards difference as a blessing. In April 2025 she described Bill 94, which proposed to extend restrictions on religious symbols in Quebec schools, as "deeply against the other values we share as Canadians and Quebecers", and later that year, responding to the government's plan to regulate public prayer, she said that "the problem isn't religion, the problem is radicalism".

In June 2015 she took part in the first meeting of Jewish and Muslim clergy and lay leaders in Montreal convened under the auspices of the Foundation for Ethnic Understanding. After the Christchurch mosque shootings in March 2019, she joined a solidarity gathering outside Montreal's El Markaz Islamic Centre, recalling that "the Muslim community supported us in our grief after the Pittsburgh synagogue attack". In 2022 the temple mounted outdoor portraits from the Indigenous Forced Displacement Project; Grushcow, who had devoted a Kol Nidre sermon to the treatment of Indigenous peoples in Canada, said that Canadians should acknowledge that "there are things of which we should be ashamed". In December 2024 she took part in the Montreal launch of a Uyghur translation of Viktor Frankl's Man's Search for Meaning, supported by members of the city's Jewish community.

=== Refugee sponsorship ===
In her Rosh Hashanah sermon in September 2015, prompted by the photograph of the drowned Syrian child Alan Kurdi, Grushcow asked her congregants to act on behalf of refugees. Temple Emanu-El-Beth Sholom became the first Montreal Jewish organization to commit to privately sponsoring Syrian refugees; by the end of September 2015 it had raised close to $70,000, enough to sponsor two families. Grushcow said that the refugees' religion had never been a consideration for the congregation and described the project as an opportunity to build relationships with Montreal's Muslim community. The first family arrived in Montreal on February 27, 2017, with the second due the following month. In 2018 she backed a public statement by 33 Canadian rabbis urging the federal government to suspend the Canada–United States Safe Third Country Agreement.

=== Israel and antisemitism ===
In May 2023 Grushcow was one of three Montreal rabbis whose names headed a petition of more than 770 signatories expressing concern over the Israeli government's judicial overhaul, and she was among the scheduled speakers at a rally outside the Israeli consulate on May 5.

On February 15, 2025, a swastika was spray-painted on the exterior of Temple Emanu-El-Beth Sholom. Grushcow made the incident public in a video the following day, calling on Montrealers to reach out to their Jewish neighbours and to speak up against antisemitic remarks, and describing the period as "an incredibly isolating time" for many of her congregants. In a June 2025 opinion piece in La Presse, written amid efforts to exclude Zionist groups from that year's Fierté Montréal parade, she argued that "being Jewish, LGBTQ+, and Zionist are not mutually exclusive".

In the early hours of June 5, 2026, a masked man allegedly smashed a window of the synagogue and tried to set fire to the interior; a protective film on the glass kept the fire outside the building, no one was injured, and a 38-year-old suspect was arrested nearby. Grushcow said the congregation was "unfortunately not surprised" and described the attack as an escalation following the swastika incident. Interviewed by The Canadian Press on the third anniversary of the October 7 attacks, she said that "the society we're living in is not quite the society we thought", recounted being called a "baby killer" at a Pride march while wearing a rainbow Star of David, and said that the work of change "can't come entirely from the Jewish community".

== Personal life ==
Grushcow's first spouse was Rabbi Andrea Myers, author of the 2011 memoir The Choosing: A Rabbi's Journey from Silent Nights to High Holy Days. Their union was sanctified in a religious ceremony in New York in 2001, and they were legally married in Kingston, Ontario, in 2003, soon after same-sex marriage became legal in Ontario. The couple moved to Montreal with their two daughters in 2012; the marriage ended about a year later. She remarried in 2018, and in 2022 had three children.

== Bibliography ==
- Grushcow, Lisa (2006). Writing the Wayward Wife: Rabbinic Interpretations of Sotah. Ancient Judaism and Early Christianity. Vol. 62. Leiden; Boston: Brill. doi:10.1163/9789047417811. ISBN 978-90-474-1781-1.
- Grushcow, Lisa, ed. (March 1, 2014). The Sacred Encounter: Jewish Perspectives on Sexuality. New York: CCAR Press. OCLC 869141170.
- Grushcow, Lisa (2018). "A Jewish view of sexuality". In Knobel, Peter S.; Maslin, Simeon J. (eds.). Navigating the Journey: The Essential Guide to the Jewish Life Cycle. New York: CCAR Press. OCLC 1111664760.
