= Adath Israel (Montreal) =

Synagogue in Hampstead, Quebec, Canada

- Hebrew: עדת ישראל
- Location in Montreal

Religion
- Affiliation: Modern Orthodox Judaism
- Rite: Ashkenazi
- Leadership: Rabbi Michael Whitman
- Status: Active

Location
- Location: 223 Harrow Crescent; Hampstead, Quebec
- Country: Canada
- Coordinates: 45.480850°N 73.655680°W

Architecture
- Established: 1930; 96 years ago
- Completed: 1940 (Outremont); 1981 (Hampstead)

Website
- adath.ca

Adath Israel, officially the Adath Israel–Poale Zedek–Anshei Ozeroff Congregation (Hebrew: ק״ק עדת ישראל–פועלי צדק–אנשי אזשעראוו), is a Modern Orthodox synagogue located in Hampstead, Quebec, a suburb of Montreal. Until 1980 it was located in the city of Outremont (now a borough of Montreal).

== History ==
Adath Israel was established in 1930, initially situated in a rented space above a delicatessen on Van Horne Avenue in Outremont. Construction of the congregation's permanent home at 899 McEchran Avenue began in 1939, and the synagogue was dedicated in 1940. That same year, Charles Bender, formerly of the Spanish and Portuguese Synagogue, became the congregation's first rabbi.

In 1941, Adath Israel became the first synagogue in Canada to establish a Jewish day school—the Adath Israel School—which pioneered the Ivrit b'Ivrit method of Hebrew language immersion.

The congregation moved to the suburb of Hampstead in 1981. In 1992, Adath Israel amalgamated with Congregation Poale Zedek (founded in 1910), and, in 2003, with Congregation Anshei Ozeroff (founded in 1918).

== Building ==
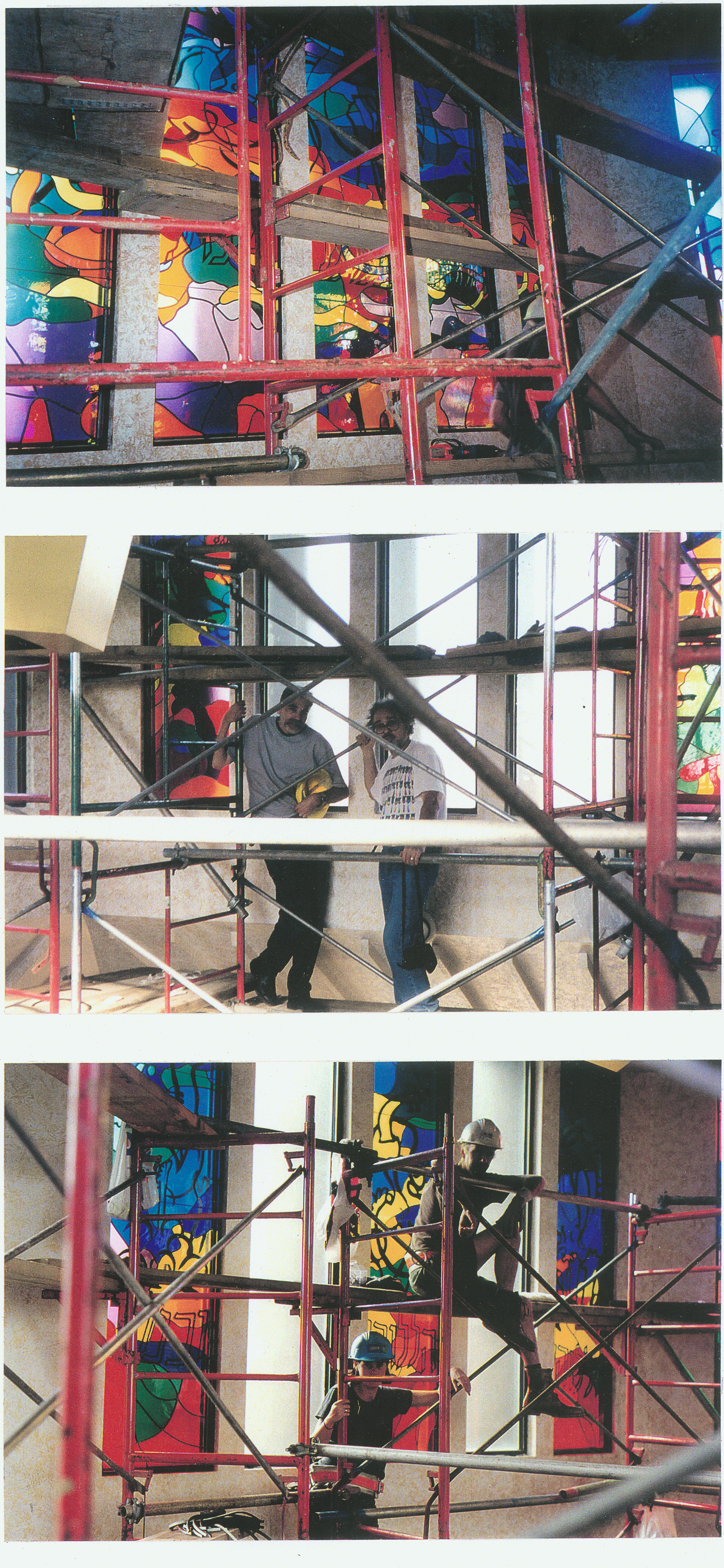
Installation of stained glass windows by Yehouda Chaki.

Adath Israel's original building at McEachran and Ducharme was designed by architects Milton Eliasoph and Henry E. Greenspoon. Its Bauhaus-influenced modernist style represents a shift from traditional synagogue architecture in Montreal. The building now houses the Saint Anthony the Great Monastery.

The synagogue's Hampstead building was designed by architect Harry Mayerovitch. It is noted for its Torah ark designed by Eva Vecsei, and its 30 stained glass panels by Yehouda Chaki depicting Biblical themes.

== Clergy ==
The following individuals have served, or are currently serving, in clerical roles in the congregation:

=== Rabbis ===
- Charles Bender (1940–1969)
- Michael Kramer (1969–2001)
- Michael Whitman (2001–present)

=== Ḥazzanim ===
- Myer Mandelcorn (1932–?)
- William Sauler (1940–1945)
- Eugene Goldberger (1947–1965)
- Benjamin Hass (1965–1987)
- Yaakov Motzen (1987–1997)
- Abraham Sultan (1997–2007)
- Shmuel Levin (2012–2016)
