= Temple Beth Ora Synagogue (Edmonton) =

Synagogue in Edmonton, Alberta, Canada

Temple Beth Ora
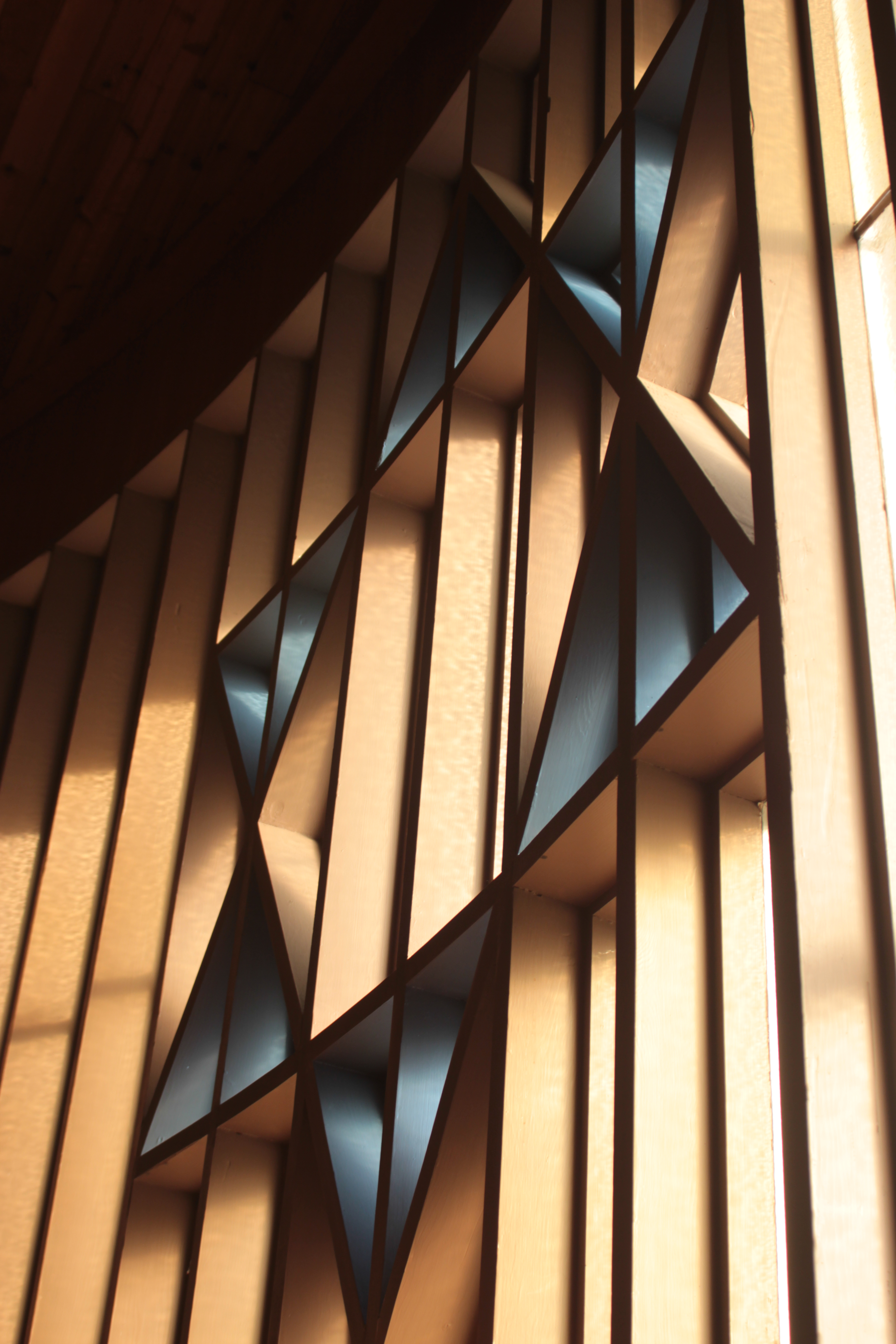
- Stained glass at Temple Beth Ora

Religion
- Affiliation: Reform Judaism
- Ecclesiastical or organisational status: Synagogue
- Leadership: Rabbi Gila Caine
- Status: Active

Location
- Location: 12313 105 Avenue NW, Edmonton, Alberta T5N 0Y5
- Country: Canada
- Interactive map of Temple Beth Ora
- Administration: Union for Reform Judaism
- Coordinates: 53.5476236°N 113.5347767°W

Architecture
- Established: 1979

Website
- templebethora.org

Temple Beth Ora logo introduced in 2015

Temple Beth Ora, abbreviated as TBO, is a Reform synagogue located at 12313 105 Avenue NW in the Westmount neighbourhood of Edmonton, Alberta, Canada. Founded in 1979 as Beth Ora Synagogue, it is the city's only Reform synagogue.

Since its establishment, the congregation has occupied several buildings. For many years, Temple Beth Ora conducted services in the JCC Building overlooking the North Saskatchewan River. In 2007, TBO moved from the Edmonton JCC to Chesed Shel Emeth, home of Edmonton's Chevra kadisha.

The congregation is affiliated with the Union for Reform Judaism. Rabbi Gila Caine was installed in April 2018.

== See also ==
- History of the Jews in Canada
- List of synagogues in Canada
