= Congregation Shaar Hashomayim (Windsor) =

Orthodox Jewish synagogue in Windsor

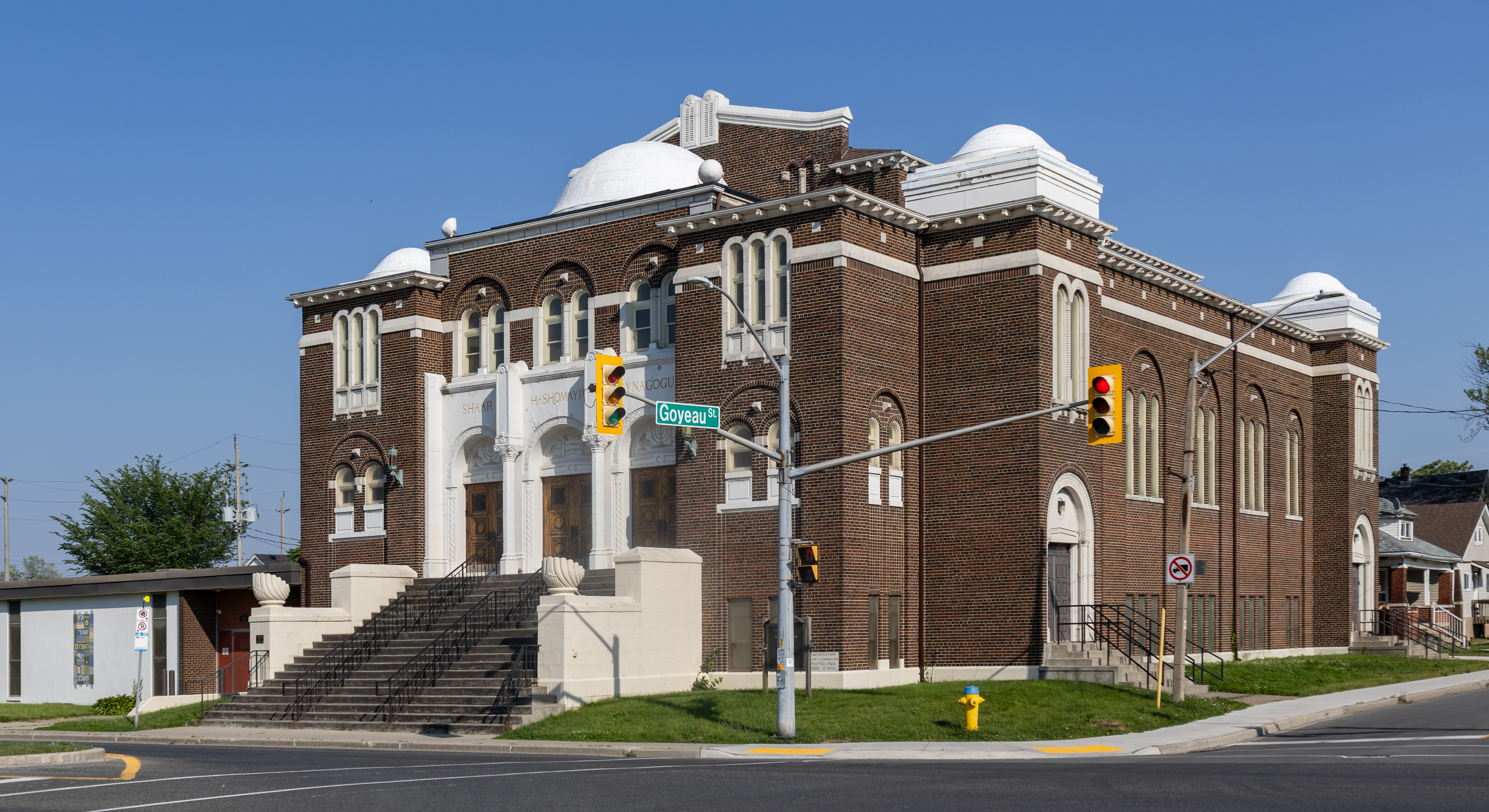
- Congregation Shaar Hashomayim, 2025

Religion
- Affiliation: Orthodox Judaism

Location
- Municipality: Windsor
- State: Ontario
- Country: Canada
- Interactive map of Congregation Shaar Hashomayim
- Coordinates: 42°18′21″N 83°01′44″W

Architecture
- Architect: Andrew Stuart Allaster
- Completed: 1929–1930

Congregation Shaar Hashomayim is an Orthodox Jewish synagogue with Conservative influences in Windsor, Ontario, Canada. Modelled after the similarly named synagogue in Montreal, the synagogue was constructed between 1929 and 1930 to serve the city's growing Jewish population. It experienced a period of growth through the 1950s, developing its own school and cemetery under a series of rabbis. As the Jewish community has dwindled, and following the rise of Reform congregations, Shaar Hashomayim has diminished.

== Location and description ==
Congregation Shaar Hashomayim is located at 115 Giles Boulevard East, at the corner of Giles Boulevard and Goyeau Street. The synagogue is built in the Byzantine style. It is 52 feet (16 m) high and has a capacity of 1,000 people. Access is provided through three main doorways that face south onto Giles Boulevard. The name "Shaar Hashomayim" translates to "Gate of Heaven". As of 2023, the congregation is led by cantor David Neumark, with the support of Rabbi Sholom Galperin.

== History ==
=== Inception ===
In 1910s and 1920s, the Jewish community of Windsor, Ontario, grew rapidly, resulting in the existing Congregation Shaarey Zedek and Congregation Talmud Torah being insufficient for the community's needs. Plans were made to establish a new, larger synagogue in the city, with a building committee assembled in 1925. Such a synagogue would highlight the prominence and affluence of the Jewish community, thereby impressing the non-Jewish residents of the city. Inspiration came from the Congregation Shaar Hashomayim in Montreal, Quebec, which had become a local landmark.

The site of the future synagogue was announced in December 1928, and a building committee headed by Samuel K. Baum was assembled. Funds came from existing congregations, with further campaigns headed by the rabbis Samuel Sachs and Israel Lebendiger; the latter was appointed leader of the new congregation in late 1928. By the end of February 1929, the congregation had raised CAD 80,000. The total cost of construction was estimated at CAD 150,000. Further funding was obtained through a CAD 65,000 mortgage from the Dominion Life Assurance Company, and ultimately the final cost was CAD 250,000.

For the design, the Windsor-based architect Andrew Stuart Allaster drew from the Congregation Shaar Hashomayim. Construction was contracted to N. R. Ibbeston and Company. Groundbreaking began in June 1929, with the cornerstone laid that September. Services began on Rosh Hashanah the following year. Regular services on Fridays and prayers on Saturdays began afterwards. The synagogue was formally dedicated on 25 May 1930, with attendees including Jewish and Christian leaders as well as mayor Cecil E. Jackson.

=== Growth ===
Shaar Hashomayim was identified as Orthodox in its constitution, though it soon incorporated elements of Conservative Judaism. Shortly after its establishment, the congregation began allowing English-language prayers, as well as sermons on secular topics. It also permitted men and women to worship without a curtain between them, albeit still segregated. Soon a religious school began operations, as did a sisterhood for female members.

The new synagogue faced some opposition within the Jewish community. Initially, the synagogue was to face Goyeau Street, allowing the Torah ark to face eastward; after this design was modified for a southern entrance, several Orthodox rabbis refused to use the synagogue. Other members of the community, viewing Shaar Hashomayim as elitist, joined smaller congregations. Nevertheless, the synagogue became a favoured meeting place for the Jewish community.

Also challenging the new synagogue was the Great Depression, as a result of which a planned community centre was delayed. Likewise, Lebendiger was replaced in 1932 with a series of guest speakers, with a new rabbi – Nahum Schulman – only appointed in 1934. He phased out several elements, including a mixed-sex choir as well as late-night Friday services.

Schulman resigned in 1942, moving to the United States, and was replaced as rabbi by Benjamin Groner. During this time, he oversaw the establishment of the Windsor's Jewish Community Bulletin in 1943, which was aimed at all congregations, as well as efforts to promote unity within the Jewish community and with other faiths. The synagogue also initiated various programmes designed to attract congregants, as well as packages for Jewish soldiers fighting in World War II.

By the end of 1945, Shaar Hashomayim counted 225 families as congregants. The following year, the congregation had paid off its mortgage, which was celebrated with a mortgage burning attended by 350 people. In May 1947, the synagogue hosted a sermon attended by 1,100 congregants to celebrate the founding of Israel. Groner left Shaar Hashomayim for Chicago in early 1949, and after a period under Reverend Irwin Dubitsky, Samuel Stollman was hired as the community's rabbi in June.

Stollman considered himself a moderate Orthodox rabbi, and his first years focused on implementing new programs. Education was a priority, and he expanded Shaar Hashomayim's school while also implementing new classes for both children and adults. Other programmes included a study group, known as the tefillin club, as well as a men's club. The Congregation Shaar Hashomayim also expanded during his tenure, with new offices and classrooms built along Giles Boulevard. The introduction of studies about Israel, meanwhile, appealed to members of Talmud Torah, and ultimately its members were brought into the congregation.

Fundraising for the modernization of the synagogue, including renovated kitchen facilities and air conditioning, began in 1959; the program was completed by the end of the 1960s. Such modernization did not occur in teachings. Throughout his tenure, Stollman resisted calls for a "more modern, but still Conservative", Shaar Hashomayim. Ultimately, several members of the congregation left to establish the Temple Beth El, which began services in 1960 using a Reform approach. Stollman believed that, "by being intransigent about mixed seating," he had partially driven the establishment of a Reform congregation.

=== Subsequent years ===
The Orthodox Jewish community in Windsor dwindled later in the century. Several congregations had disbanded by the end of the 1970s, while others were losing members to newly established Reform ones. The city's total Jewish population shrank to 1,831, with most over the age of 65. Shaar Hashomayim began to modify its approaches, with women being allowed to hold offices beginning in 1975, though it continued to emphasize the need to remain "bound by and subject to the requirements of Orthodoxy, as represented by the divine written and oral law of Torah and Halacha."

In 1977, Stollman retired as rabbi, citing health reasons. He was replaced by Rabbi Benjamin Z. Holczer in 1978, who was dismissed before the end of his one-year contract but remained involved in the congregation through 1980. Ira Samuel Grussgott of New York was subsequently hired as rabbi. Unlike his predecessors, Grussgott established a cordial relationship with the Reform community, to the point of using Shaar Hashomayim for several Beth El congregants undergoing their bar and bat mitzvahs. He departed in 1984, and was followed by several short-lived rabbis: Edward S. Feigelman (1984–1985) and Martin J. Applebaum (1986).

Rabbi Yosil Rosenzweig was hired by Shaar Hashomayim in 1989, based on his performance during the High Holy Days. He served for seven years, resigning in 1996 to lead a congregation in California. Cantor David Neumark subsequently took over the leadership role, albeit not in a spiritual capacity. Funerals and other religious functions were presided by Rabbi Jeffrey Ableser of Beth El, with guidance in Orthodox law by Rabbi Joseph Krupnik.

Rabbi Mitchell Kornspan spent some time with Shaar Hashomayim beginning in 2002, but ultimately financial constraints limited the congregation's ability to hire a long-term rabbi. Renovations were expansive and expensive, with CAD 300,000 used for a new heating system in the 2020s.

== Other facilities ==
Shaar Hashomayim owns a cemetery near Pilette Road, donated by Jerry Glanz in the 1930s. It was shared with Beth El from 1968 through 1981. Among the persons buried there are Moses David, the city's first Jewish settler, and Harry and Fannie Gray, the parents of Herb Gray.

Shaar Hashomayim operates a religious school. Beginning as weekly classes in the 1930s, it was expanded and formalized in the 1940s. A dedicated building was constructed in the 1960s. Attendance dwindled in the 1970s, reaching 39 students in 1976. To stimulate enrolment amidst an aging congregation, Shaar Hashomayim – upon the recommendation of Yehudah Lipitz of the Canadian Jewish Congress – began using Sephardic rather than Ashkenazic pronunciation when teaching Hebrew. At the same time, the school remained smaller than that run by Beth El, exacerbating tensions between the congregations. Ultimately, the schools were combined.

== Works cited ==
- "Congregation Shaar Hashomayim" (Map). Google Maps.
- Hill, Robert G. (2009). "Allaster, Andrew Stuart". Biographical Dictionary of Architects in Canada, 1800–1950. Archived from the original on 26 April 2025.
- Schwartz, Danny (18 June 2023). "Windsor's Congregation Shaar Hashomayim Nears Its Centennial". The Detroit Jewish News. Archived from the original on 3 July 2023.
- Plaut, Jonathan V. (2007). The Jews of Windsor, 1790–1990: A Historical Chronicle. Dundurn. ISBN 978-1-55002-942-0.
