= Beth Israel Synagogue (Halifax, Nova Scotia) =

- Hebrew: בית ישראל
- Beth Israel Synagogue, Halifax

Religion
- Affiliation: Modern Orthodox Judaism
- Ecclesiastical or organisational status: Synagogue
- Leadership: Rabbi Yakov Kerzner
- Status: Active

Location
- Location: 1480 Oxford Street, Halifax, Nova Scotia, B3H 3Y8
- Country: Canada
- Interactive map of Beth Israel Synagogue
- Coordinates: 44.644161°N 63.599672°W

Architecture
- Style: Synagogue
- Established: 1895

Website
- www.thebethisrael.com

Beth Israel Synagogue (Hebrew: בית ישראל) is a Modern Orthodox synagogue located at 1480 Oxford Street in Halifax, Nova Scotia, Canada. Formally chartered by a Private Member's Bill in the Nova Scotia legislature in 1895, it grew out of the Baron de Hirsch Hebrew Benevolent Society (named after Baron Maurice de Hirsch), which was formed in 1890. It was the first Orthodox congregation in Canada east of Montreal, and still provides the only daily minyan in Canada east of Montreal. In 1953, several families from the Beth Israel Synagogue left to form the Shaar Shalom Synagogue. The Beth Israel is also one of the few synagogues in the region with a functioning mikveh.

As of 2016 the rabbi was Yakov Kerzner.
