= Shaar Shalom Synagogue =

Synagogue in Halifax, Nova Scotia, Canada

Shaar Shalom Congregation
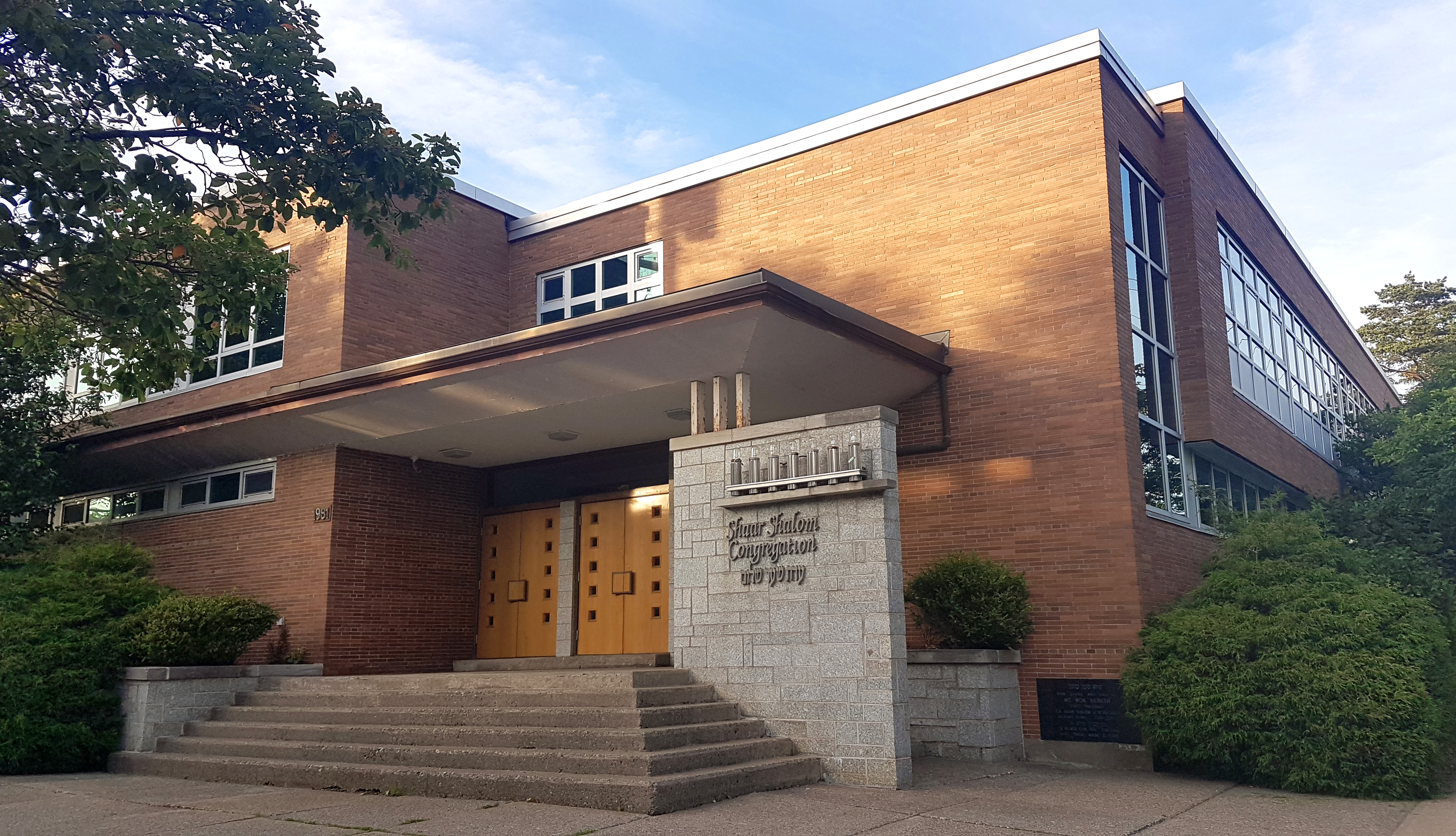
- The synagogue in 2019

- Location in Nova Scotia

Religion
- Affiliation: Conservative Judaism
- Ecclesiastical or organisational status: Synagogue
- Leadership: Rabbi Gary Karlin
- Status: Active

Location
- Location: 1981 Oxford Street, Halifax, Nova Scotia, B3H 4A4
- Administration: United Synagogue of Conservative Judaism
- Coordinates: 44.645304°N 63.599563°W

Architecture
- Groundbreaking: 1954
- Completed: 1955

Website
- theshaar.ca

The Shaar Shalom Synagogue (inscribed in Hebrew: עדת שער שלום, Adas Shaar Shalom on the corner of the building), is a Conservative synagogue located in Halifax, Nova Scotia.

The Shaar Shalom Synagogue was among the first Canadian Conservative synagogues to hire women in clergy positions and welcome same-sex partners as members.

== History ==
It was founded in 1953 by a collective of families who were members of Halifax's Baron de Hirsch Synagogue who sought a community that would permit "family seating" (also known as mixed seating or the opportunity for men and women to sit together). They sought an egalitarian ideology that would permit women's political and ritual leadership.

The community has had professional leaders over the years, including Dr. Irving Perlin. Perlin was an obstetrician who served as a lay hazzan and mohel, and presided over weekly sabbath liturgies and ceremonial circumcisions. The synagogue is a supporter of Camp Kadimah.

Many of the art pieces still decorating the synagogue were procured during David Jacobs' tenure from 1953-1957. The building that stands at the corner of Oxford St. and Pepperell St. was dedicated on October 31, 1955.

== Rabbinic Leaders ==
- 1953-1957: Rabbi David J. Jacobs, an enthusiast of modern Jewish art
- 1957-1961: Unknown
- 1962-1964: Rabbi Emanuel S. Goldsmith
- 1965-1968: Unknown
- 1969: Rabbi Dr. Max Wallach.
- 1970-1974: Unknown
- 1975-1976: Rabbi Leo Heim
- 1977: Unknown
- 1983-1995: Rabbi Jacob Chinitz
- 1995-1998: Rabbi Pamela Hoffman (part-time, and later full-time)
- 1999-2000: Unknown
- 2000-2001: Rabbi Dr. Michael Goldberg, author of Why Should Jews Survive?: Looking Past the Holocaust Toward a Jewish Future (Oxford University Press, 1995)
- 2001-2010: Ari Isenberg-Grzeda (part-time, rabbinical students)
- 2010-2011: Catherine Clark & Joshua Rabin (part-time, rabbinical students)
- 2011-2013: Ari Isenberg-Grzeda (part-time, rabbinical student)
- 2013-2015: Rabbi Ari Isenberg-Grzeda (full-time)
- 2015-2016: Rabbi Irit Printz (part-time)
- 2016–2019: Rabbi Dr. Raysh Weiss (full-time Senior Rabbi) & Rabbi Jonah Rank (part-time, rabbinic educator position)
- 2019–present: Rabbi Gary Karlin (full-time)
