= Yehouda Chaki =

Greek-born Canadian artist (born 1938)

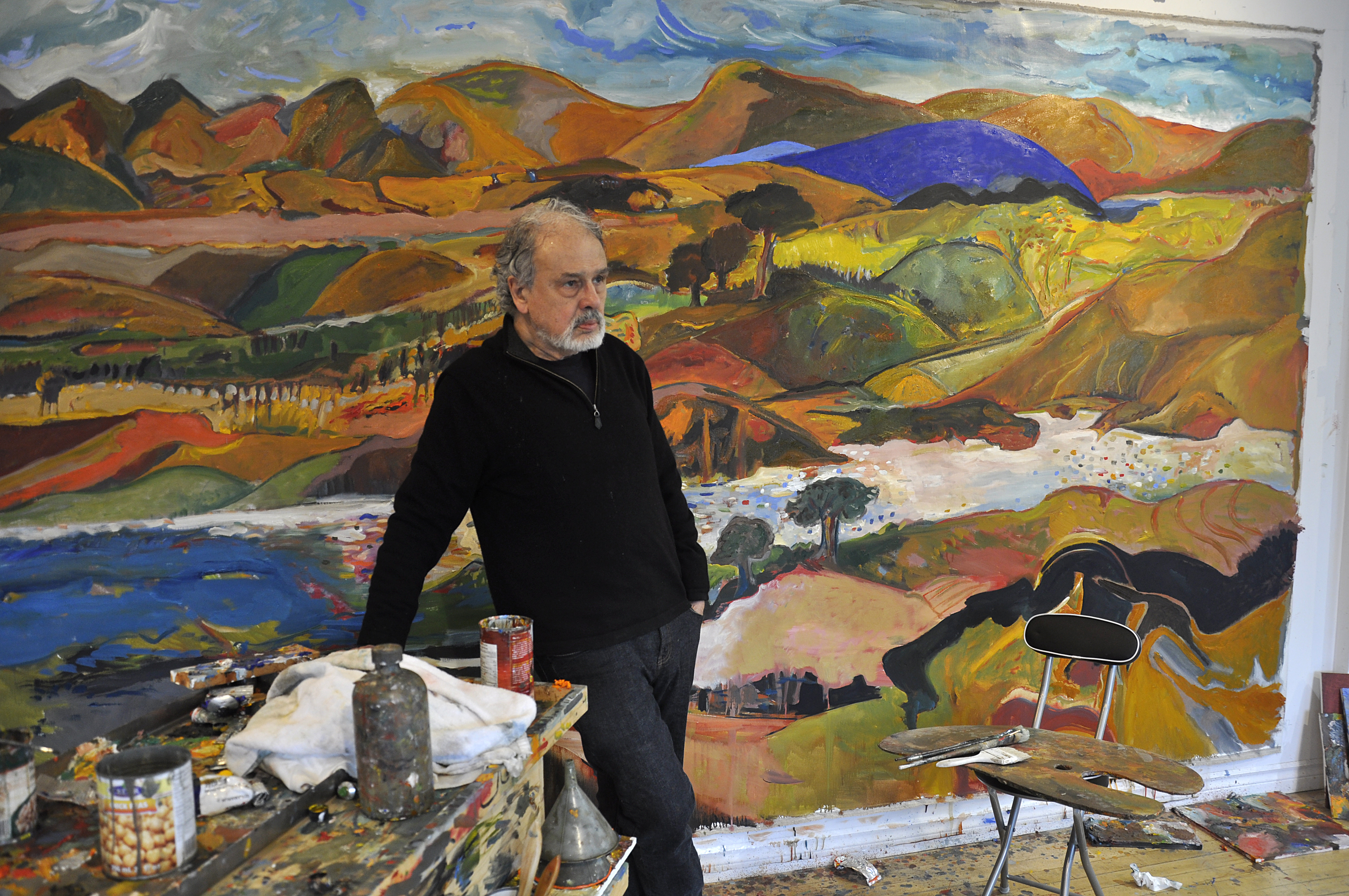
- Yehouda Chaki in studio, 2016
- Born: Yehouda Leon Chaki; December 11, 1938; Athens, Greece
- Died: September 4, 2023 (aged 84); Montreal, Canada
- Known for: artist
- Spouse: Grace Aronoff (m. 1963)

Yehouda Leon Chaki (December 11, 1938 – September 4, 2023) was a Greek-born Canadian artist based in Montreal, Quebec. Best known for his colourful palette and expressionistic landscapes, he began exhibiting in 1959 and today his work can be found in many public and corporate collections and museums around the world including the Musée d'art contemporain de Montréal, Beaverbrook Art Gallery, Eretz Israel Museum and Philadelphia Museum.

== Biography ==
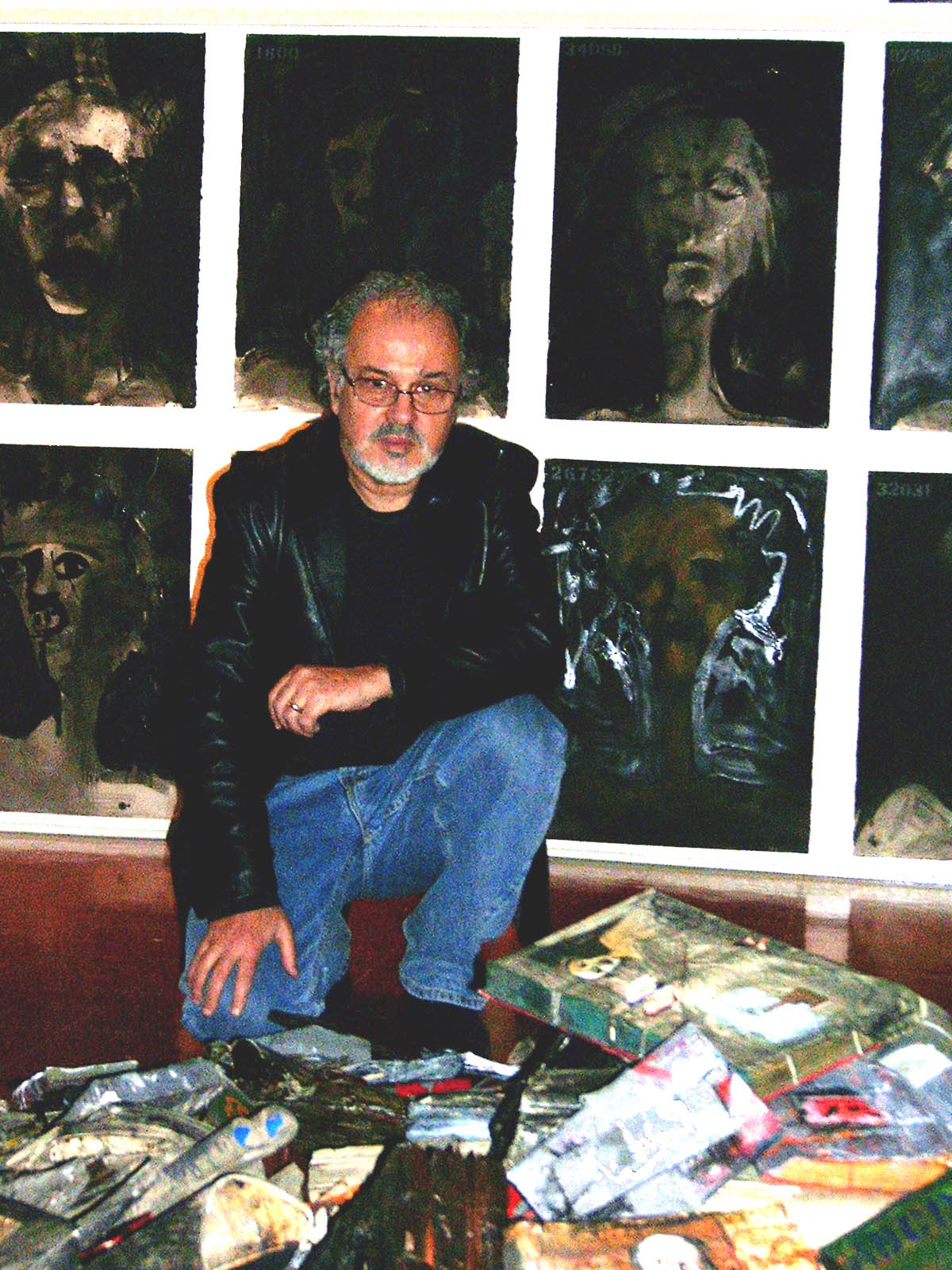
Chaki with his "Mi Makir exhibit

Yehouda Chaki was born in Athens, Greece, the son of Sephardic Jewish parents. His early childhood was marked by the Holocaust. Chaki and his parents spent five years secretly living in the home of a Christian family in Athens before they could safely relocate to Israel with his younger brother.

This event inspired many of his works including his 1968 painting which was hung at Concordia University titled "Express Train from Salonika to Auschwitz" depicting the transport of Jews to the concentration camps during the Holocaust and the 1999 Mi Makir installation described in the book Mi Makir: A Search for the Missing. This exhibit featured a wall filled with dark unframed portraits of Holocaust victims each bearing a number in the top left corner, and a large pile of burned books on the floor.

Chaki lived in Holon, near Tel Aviv, from 1945 to 1960. Throughout his adolescence, he studied painting, drawing and printmaking under Joseph Schwartzman and in his teens entered the Avni Institute of Art to study with Avigdor Stematsky, Moshe Mokady and Yehezchel Streichman. Following compulsory army service, he moved to Paris to complete his education at the Ecole Nationale Supérieure des Beaux-Arts while working for artist Yaacov Agam.

In Paris, Chaki met Montrealer Grace Aronoff who was a student at the Sorbonne. The couple married in Montreal, Canada in 1962. They have two children, Lisa, married to Alan Post and Adam Chaki, married to Lisa Noto.

== Career ==
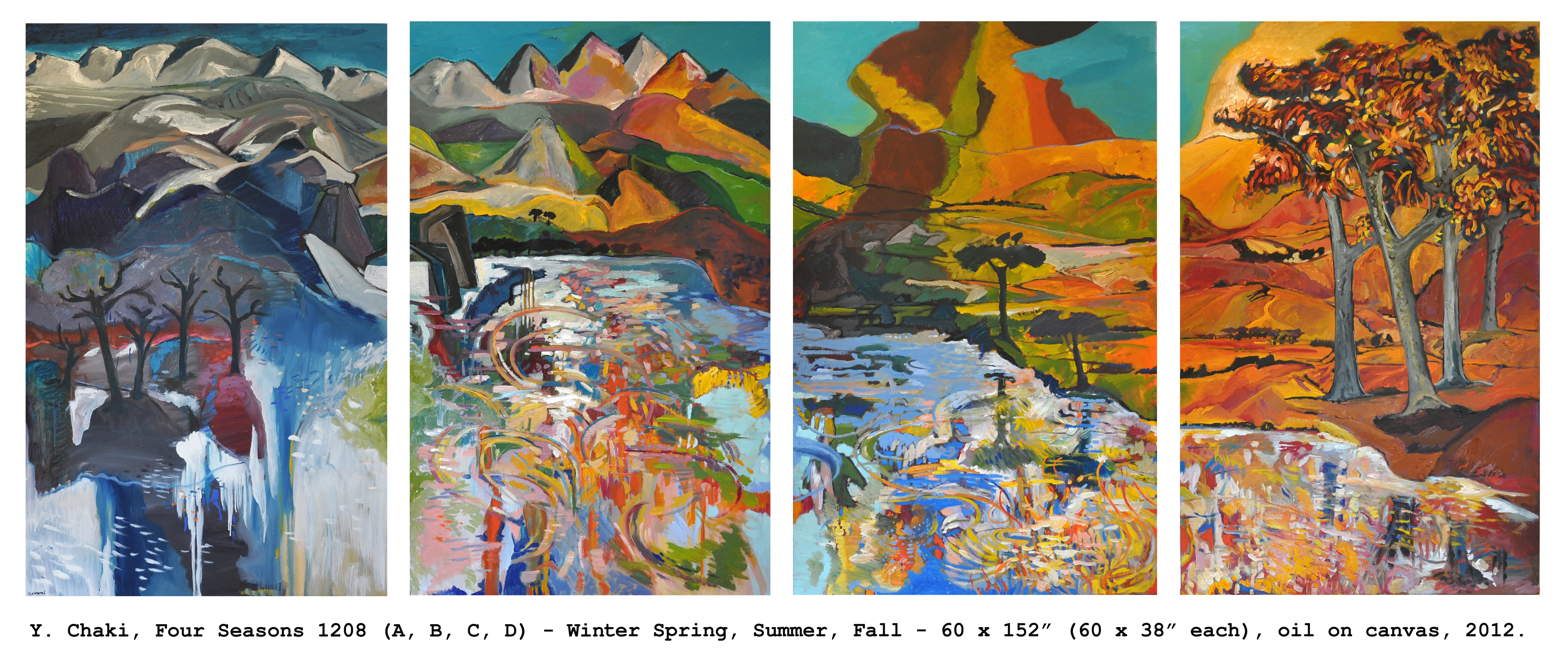
2012 quadtych oil on canvas by Yehouda Chaki

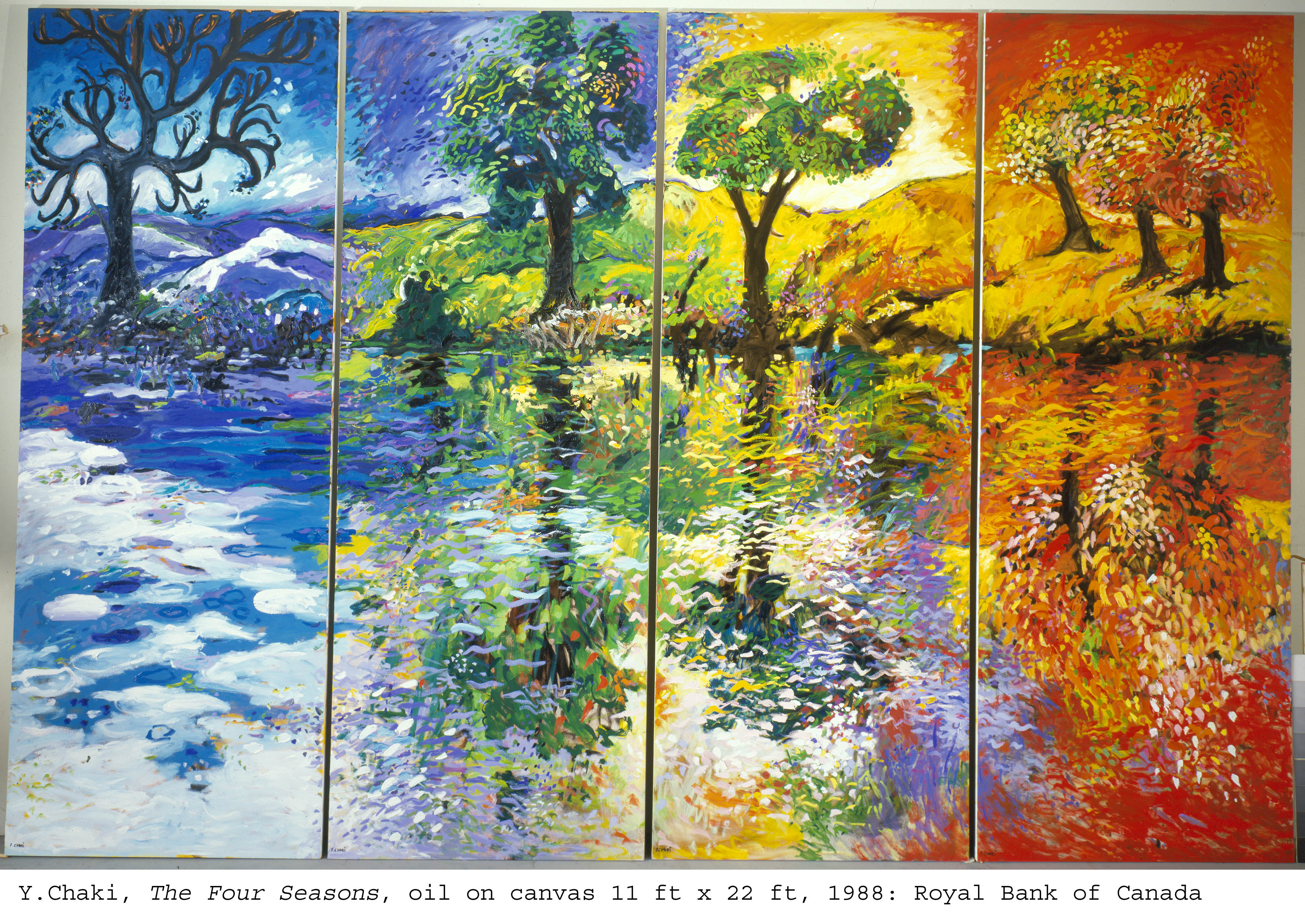
1988 "The Four Seasons" oil on canvas by Yehouda Chaki owned by The Royal Bank of Canada

Chaki exhibited regularly while continuing to work out of his studio in Montreal. From 1967 to 1989, he was the founder and head of Painting and Drawing in the Department of Fine Arts at the Saidye Bronfman Centre of Montreal.

Yehouda Chaki's work is represented by two major galleries, Odon Wagner Gallery in Toronto, and Gallery Jones in Vancouver. He completed many commissions for various patrons of the arts. In 1987 the Congregation Shaar Hashomayim commissioned Chaki to design a large tapestry in honour of the synagogue's 145th anniversary, in 1988 he painted The Four Seasons that is hanging at Place Ville-Marie for the Royal Bank of Canada, in 2000 Chaki designed the stained glass windows for the Adath Israel Congregation of Montreal, and in 2001 Salvatore Guerrera commissioned another work in stained glass for Concordia University. Chaki is also known for having created the bronze statue presented to the winners of Canada's premier fiction award, the Giller Prize, from 1994 to 2004.

Over the years his work was reviewed in art journals such as ARTnews and Vie des Arts and supported by art critics such as J. Russell Harper in "Chaki: Recent Paintings" published by Galerie Dresdnere in 1982. Chaki is also the subject of the book Chaki: A Language of Passion, published by Buschlen Mowatt Fine Arts in 1994 with essays by Barrie Mowatt, Leo Rosshandler and Herbert Aronoff. In 2017, he was featured on Federation CJA's website celebrating the Jews who played a major role in Quebec history, culture, and society.

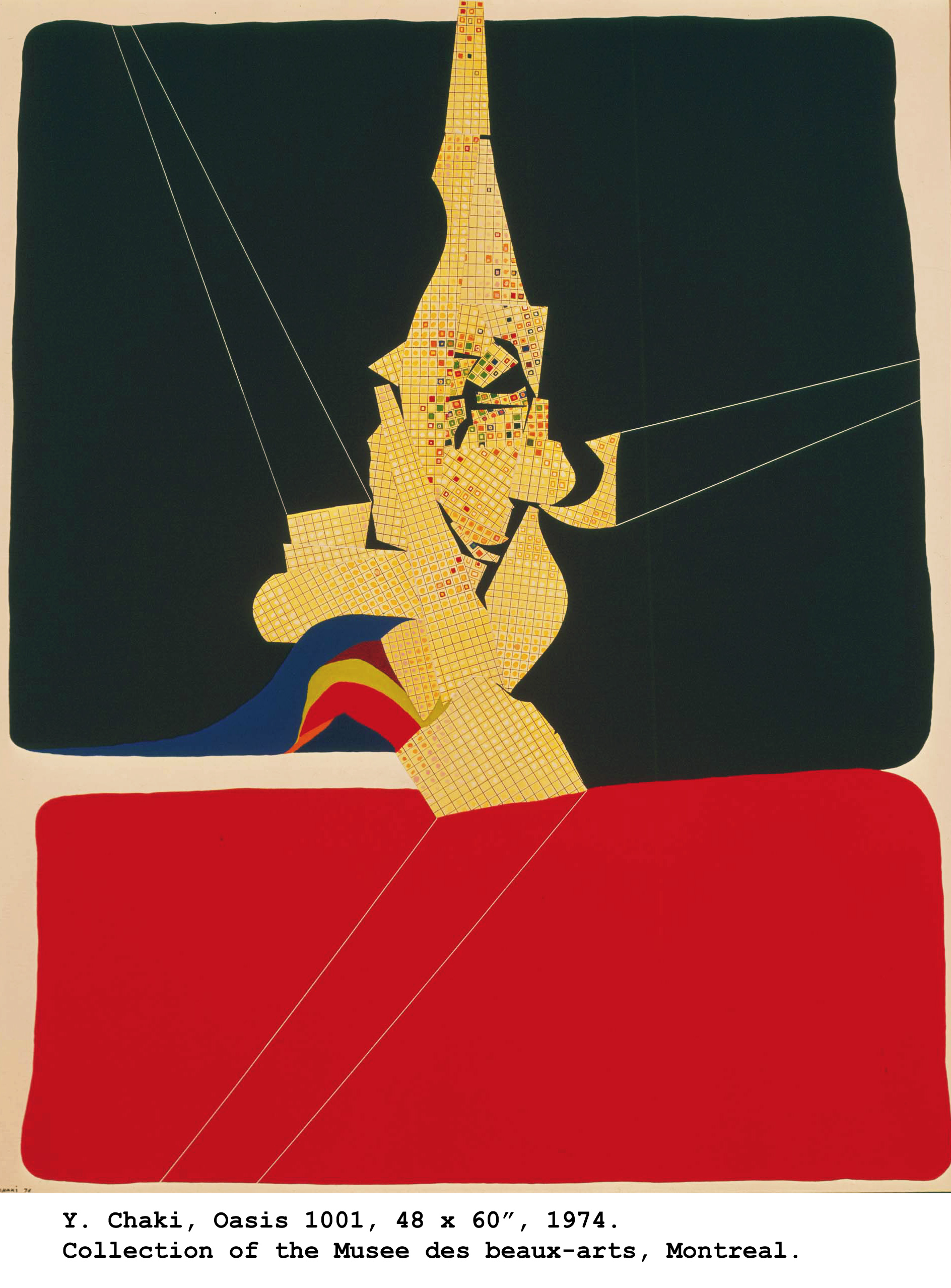
"Oasis 1001": 1974 oil on canvas, collection of the Montreal Museum of Fine Arts

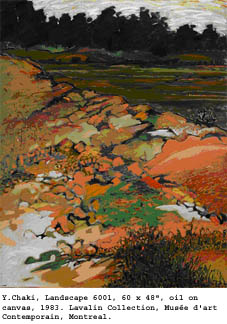
1983 oil on canvas from the Lavalin collection of the Montreal Museum of Contemporary Art

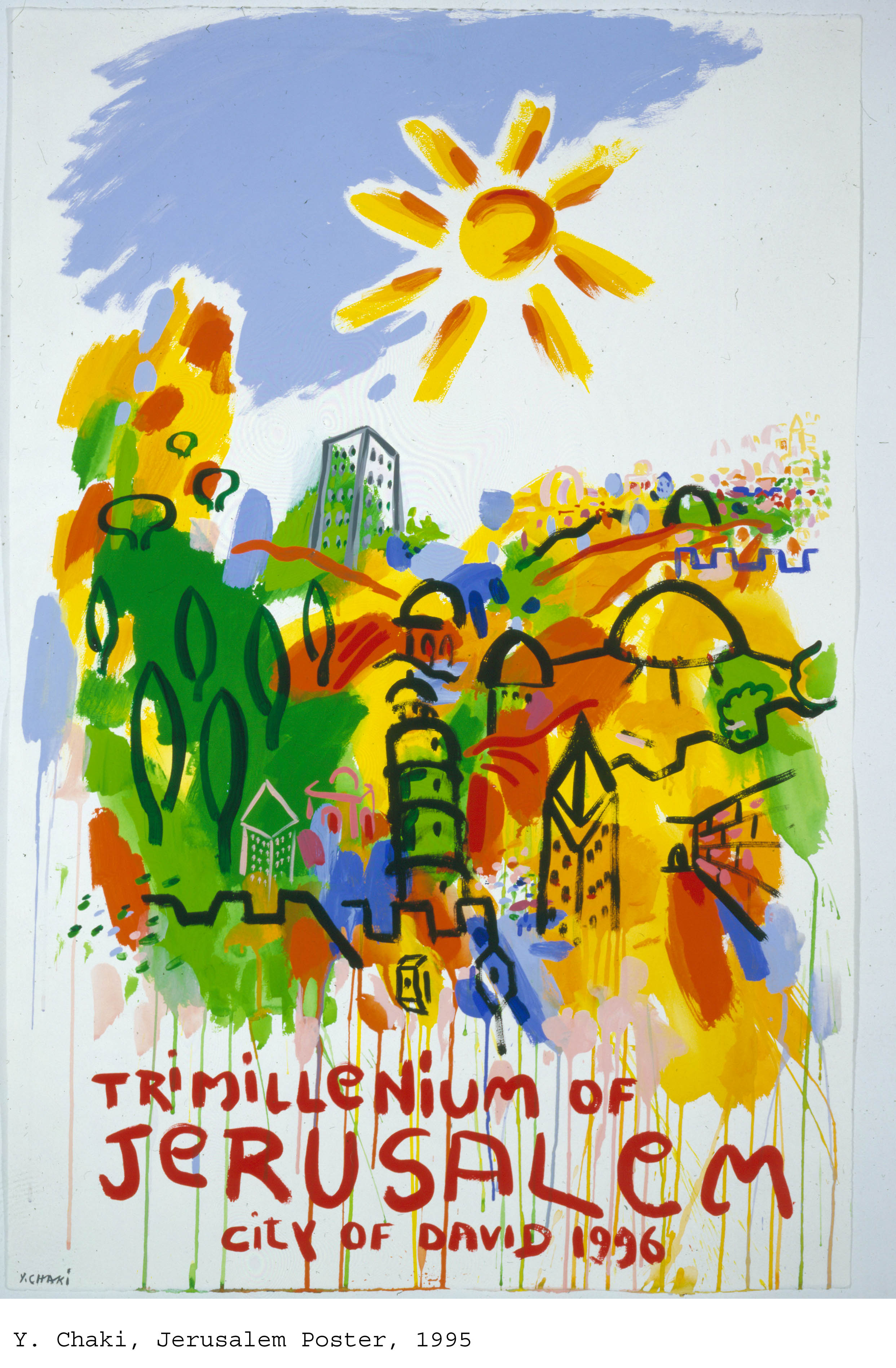
1996 tri-millennium printed poster in the Jerusalem City Hall

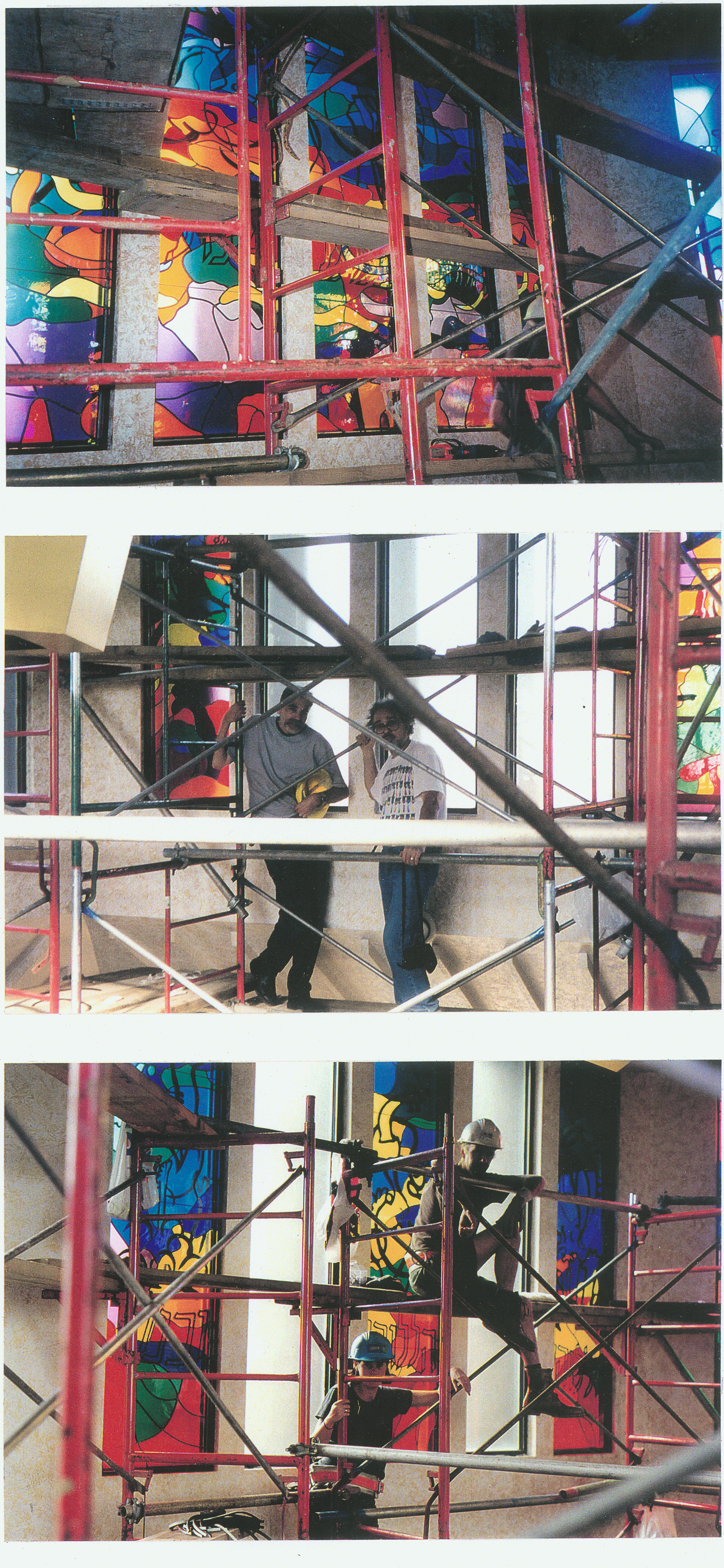
Chaki and crew installing the stained glass ("Make a Joyful Noise Unto the Lord") at Adath Israel Congregation of Montreal

== Selected collections ==
Chaki's works are in many Canadian public collections such as the Montreal Museum of Fine Arts and the Musée d'art contemporain de Montréal and museums abroad as well as in numerous corporate and private collections worldwide.

== Exhibitions ==
Chaki has had over 100 solo exhibitions since 1962. His installation of 117 portraits of Holocaust victims, Mi Makir, was on view at the Montreal Museum of Fine Arts in 2021 and is now on the museum's website. He also had solo shows at other public galleries such as the Robert McLaughlin Gallery, Oshawa (1999); Hart House, the University of Toronto (2001); the UNB Art Center, Fredericton, New Brunswick (2005); the McIntosh Gallery London, Ontario (2005); and the JMSB Concordia University, Montreal, Quebec (2010).

He showed as well at a host of commercial galleries such as in Montreal (Galerie de Bellefeuille); Toronto (Odon Wagner Gallery), Ottawa (Galerie St. Laurent + Hill), Vancouver (Buschlen Mowatt Gallery), and (Gallery Jones); in Calgary (Newzones Gallery); in Sun Valley, Idaho (Gallery DeNovo); as well as in New York (Arras Gallery) and in Israel, Belgium, and Norway, and numerous others.

== Selected group exhibitions ==
Chaki has participated in enumerable group exhibitions in galleries across North and South America, Europe and the Middle East.
