= Congregation Shomrim Laboker =

Montreal synagogue

Shomrim Laboker

Religion
- Affiliation: Orthodox Judaism

Location
- Location in Snowdon, Montreal.

Congregation Shomrim Laboker, officially Congregation Shomrim Laboker Beth Yehudah Shaare Tefillah Beth Hamedrash Hagadol Tifereth Israel, is an Orthodox synagogue located in the Snowdon neighbourhood of Montreal.

== History ==
All of the congregations that are part of today's synagogue originated as independent congregations.

Congregation Shomrim Laboker was founded in 1918, though the deed of the sale of the synagogue building dates to 1913. The building was converted and enlarged from a duplex. The synagogue officially opened on Simchat Torah in 1918. The congregation moved to its present location in 1960.

Congregation Beth Yehudah was founded in 1890. The congregation was initially housed in a converted theatre on La Gauchetière Street, before moving to the southeast corner of Duluth Avenue and City Hall Street (today's Avenue de l'Hôtel-de-Ville). The land for the building was bought in 1919 and the synagogue opened in 1923. The congregation sold the synagogue building in 1959 and moved to its present location in 1960.

Congregation Beth Hamedrash Hagadol was founded in 1917 and officially incorporated in 1918. Its original location was at 945 Notre-Dame West Street, to the northwest of des Seigneurs Street, where it was housed in the former Calvin Presbyterian Church. The name of the congregation was used at a new synagogue that was constructed in 1953 at the corner of Mackenzie Street and Lavoie Street in the Cote des Neiges area.

Congregation Shaare Tefillah was founded as Shar Tefillah, also called the Austro-Hungarian Congregation, in 1904. The building sat at the corner of Milton Street and Elgin Street (now called Clark Street). A Quebec newspaper from 1959 notes the congregation officially incorporating with the Shomrim Laboker Beth Yehuda Congregation.

Congregation Tifereth Israel was officially incorporated as a congregation in 1928.

In 1963, Beth Hamedrash Hagadol amalgamated with Tifereth Israel.

In 1985, the synagogue merged with Congregation Shomrim Laboker Beth Yehuda Shaare Tefillah.
