= Temple Emanu-El-Beth Sholom =

Reform synagogue in Westmount, Quebec, Canada

- French: Synagogue Emanu-El-Beth Sholom
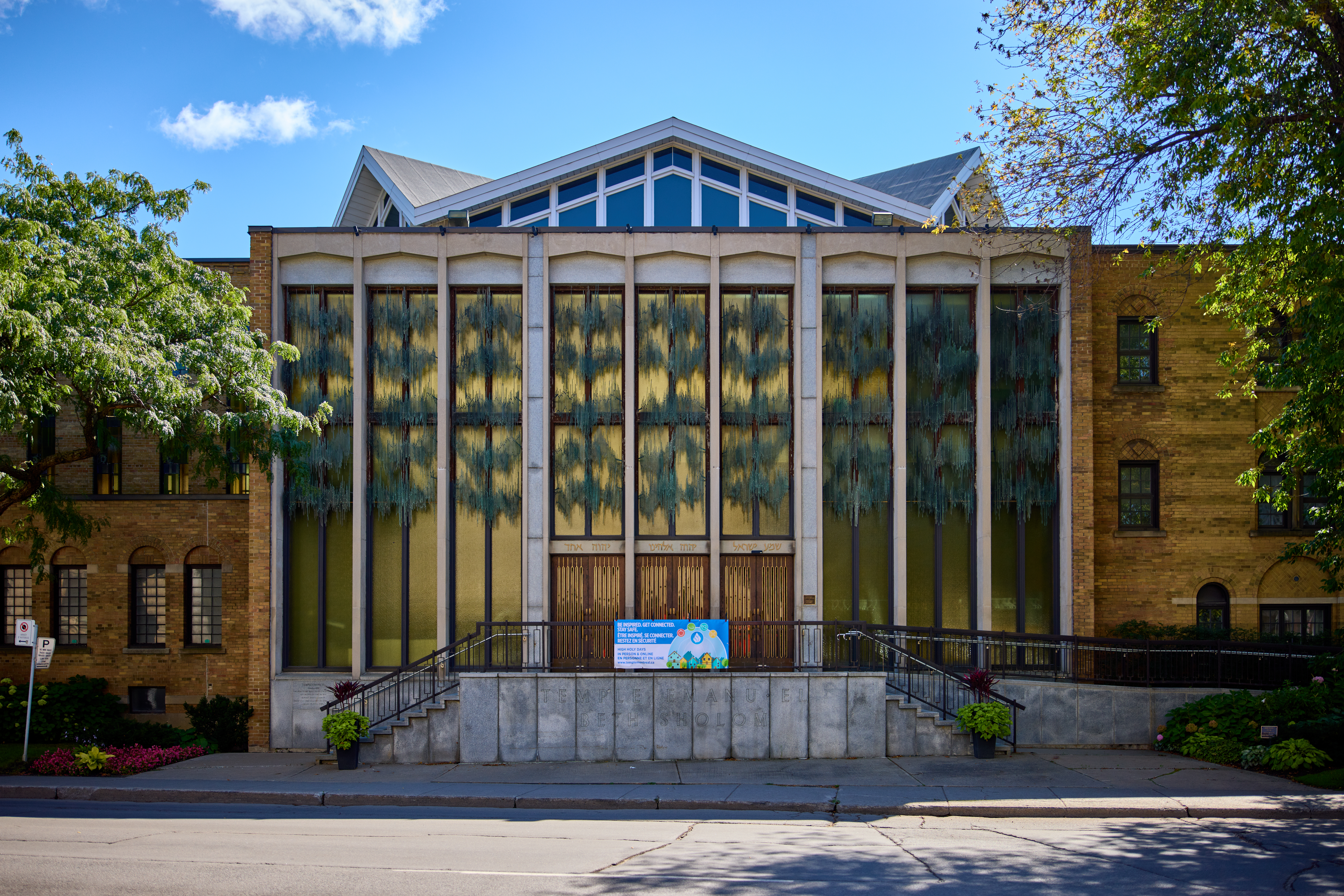
- The Sherbrooke Street façade in 2022

- Location in Quebec

Religion
- Affiliation: Reform Judaism
- Ecclesiastical or organisational status: Synagogue
- Leadership: Rabbi Lisa Grushcow
- Status: Active

Location
- Location: 4100 Sherbrooke Street West, Westmount, Quebec
- Country: Canada
- Coordinates: 45.488833°N 73.590389°W

Architecture
- Architects: Max W. Roth, with Greenspoon, Freedlander & Dunne (1958–1960); John Melville Miller (1911)
- Type: Synagogue
- Style: Modernist
- Established: 1882 (as a congregation)
- Completed: 1911; rebuilt 1958–1960

Website
- templemontreal.ca

Temple Emanu-El-Beth Sholom (French: Synagogue Emanu-El-Beth Sholom) is a Reform synagogue at 4100 Sherbrooke Street West in Westmount, on the island of Montreal. Founded in 1882, the congregation is the oldest Reform congregation in Canada and the only one remaining in Quebec. Its first building in Westmount, a Byzantine Revival temple completed in 1911, was destroyed by fire in 1957; the present Modernist sanctuary, designed by Max W. Roth with the firm Greenspoon, Freedlander & Dunne, was dedicated in 1960.

Under Rabbi Harry Joshua Stern, who led the congregation from 1927 to 1972, the temple became known for Jewish–Christian dialogue, a tradition it has maintained. It absorbed two other Reform congregations, Temple Beth Sholom in 1980 and Temple Rodeph Shalom in 1992. Since 2012 it has been led by Rabbi Lisa Grushcow, the first woman to serve as its senior rabbi. In February 2025 a swastika was spray-painted on the building, and in June 2026 the synagogue was the target of an attempted arson.

== History ==
=== Founding and early years (1882–1911) ===
On August 24, 1882, a group of Montreal Jews resolved to organize a progressive congregation, with the aim of making Judaism "clear and comprehensible to the rising generation". (Note: The Quebec heritage register gives the date of the founding meeting as August 23, 1882. Some sources give the congregation's founding as 1883.) Services began that year in the Albert Hall of Zion Church at the foot of Beaver Hall Hill, and later moved to rented rooms on St. Catherine Street. Early services featured organ music and a mixed choir. The congregation's first rabbi, Samuel Marks, came from the United States and served until 1889. A religious school opened in 1885, and in 1896 the congregation adopted the Union Prayer Book.

In 1892 the congregation built its first temple, with about 275 seats, at the corner of Stanley and Cypress Streets in downtown Montreal. By 1910 the downtown site had become too small, and the building was sold to the Windsor Hotel. The industrialist Mortimer B. Davis, a leading member of the congregation and later the first Canadian Jew to be knighted, donated land on Sherbrooke Street in Westmount, between Wood and Elm Avenues.

=== Westmount and the Stern era (1911–1957) ===
The new temple, designed by John Melville Miller in the Byzantine Revival style, was completed in 1911 and seated 700 worshippers. Its rabbi, Nathan Gordon, mediated between striking Jewish garment workers and factory owners during the 1912 garment strike; he later left the rabbinate to practise law and served as the congregation's president. A Temple Sisterhood was organized in 1908 and a Brotherhood in 1920; in 1921 the Sisterhood helped bring some 200 Jewish war orphans from Ukraine to Canada. A community house designed by C. Davis Goodman was added on Elm Avenue in 1940–1941, with an auditorium, offices and a larger religious school.

Harry Joshua Stern (1897–1984), a native of Lithuania trained at Hebrew Union College, became the congregation's rabbi in 1927 and served until his retirement in 1972. He founded a College for Jewish Studies in 1928, exchanged pulpits with Protestant ministers, and in the 1930s worked with the Jesuit Joseph Paré to turn the Catholic hierarchy in Quebec against antisemitism. He also campaigned against discrimination at McGill University and in housing. In the 1930s members lobbied against Canada's restrictive immigration policy and raised funds for refugees, and during the Second World War the Brotherhood advocated for young internees held in camps in Quebec, Jewish and non-Jewish alike. The congregation celebrated its first bar mitzvah in 1941 and its first bat mitzvah in 1943. In 1953 the Joseph Aron Museum of Jewish ceremonial art opened in the building.

Also in 1953, about fifty families left Temple Emanu-El to found Temple Beth Sholom in Notre-Dame-de-Grâce, Montreal's second Reform congregation.

=== Fire and rebuilding (1957–1960) ===
In 1957 a large extension designed by Greenspoon, Freedlander & Dunne with Max Wolfe Roth was added on the Wood Avenue side, with classrooms and space that doubled the size of the sanctuary. On December 13, 1957, a midday fire, attributed to the old heating system, destroyed the 1911 sanctuary. The side wings, the Torah scrolls and the museum collection were saved.

The congregation rebuilt over the next two years, incorporating the surviving sections into a single Modernist composition. The new sanctuary was designed by Max W. Roth (1913–2001) with Greenspoon, Freedlander & Dunne, in collaboration with Fred Lebensold and the structural engineer Ivor Kursbatt. The first services in it were held on Rosh Hashanah 1959, and the building was formally dedicated on April 22, 1960.

=== Mergers and later years ===
After Stern's retirement in 1972, the congregation was led by Rabbi Bernard Bloomstone, who conducted its centennial service of reconsecration on October 29, 1982. A chapel designed by Eliasoph, Berkowitz, Cohen & Berns was added at the rear of the building in 1974–1976. In 1980 Temple Emanu-El merged with Temple Beth Sholom, taking its present name. Temple Rodeph Shalom, founded in Dollard-des-Ormeaux in 1966 with a Torah scroll from Temple Emanu-El, merged with the congregation in 1992, and the chapel was renamed in its honour.

Leigh Lerner, who was born in Minnesota and had served for 17 years as senior rabbi of Mount Zion Temple in St. Paul, was senior rabbi from 1989 to 2012. He learned French, edited Minhag Canada, a trilingual English–French–Hebrew prayer book published in 1998, launched an Introduction to Judaism course, and twice chaired the Christian–Jewish Dialogue of Montreal. During his tenure the congregation made kippot and tallits available at services for the first time (1991), founded the French-language Dialogue judéo-chrétien, began officiating at civil unions and then same-sex marriages (2002), and started Montreal's first Jewish chapter of PFLAG. Lerner became rabbi emeritus in 2012 and died in Las Vegas on September 5, 2026.

Lisa Grushcow was appointed senior rabbi in December 2011 and took up the post on July 1, 2012; she was formally installed on October 19, 2012. She was the first woman to lead the congregation, which then had just over 1,000 member families. In 2014 the temple formed a Special Needs Working Group and hired an inclusion specialist.

== Architecture ==
The temple occupies the whole block between Wood and Elm Avenues on Sherbrooke Street West, at the eastern edge of Westmount near Dawson College; its height and bulk make it a landmark in an otherwise residential area. The Quebec heritage register describes the rebuilt temple as functionalist. The sanctuary, a steel structure clad in brick, stands between lower brown-brick wings and is fronted by a monumental portico of eight concrete pillars.

Roth kept the symbolism of the old temple's dome but reinterpreted it as a prismatic structure of folded steel plates forming a skylit lantern. The City of Westmount's heritage statement describes a folded-plate roof circumscribing a circle, whose overall effect is "one of a tent", evoking the tents of the Bible. Inside, the sanctuary is laid out like an amphitheatre around an octagonal apse; the oval concrete ark stands free of the wall, and the lighting suggests a starry sky. Ornament throughout is non-figurative, in keeping with Jewish tradition.

The Romanian-born artist Joseph Iliu (1914–1999) designed the sculpture of brazed metal rods on the façade and collaborated on the interior decoration. The sanctuary contains a 1959 Casavant organ, concealed behind the wall panelling, and a large curtain painted by J. S. Rangi that can be drawn to divide the nave.

The building is listed in the Quebec government's inventory of places of worship (2003–2004) but has no provincial or federal heritage designation. The City of Westmount includes it among its buildings of municipal heritage interest and has published a statement of its heritage value. (Note: The English and French versions of the city's heritage statement differ on the building's municipal category: the English version gives "Category 1: Significant", the French version "Catégorie 2 : Intéressant".)

== Community life ==
=== Museum and education ===
The Joseph Aron Museum, which began in 1953 as a single display cabinet, holds more than 300 objects of Jewish ceremonial art from around the world and is housed in the temple's Maurice Pollack Cultural Centre; it receives more than 2,000 visitors a year. The building also houses a Holocaust memorial collection and plaques commemorating members who served in the two world wars. The temple runs a Torah school and a daycare.

=== Interfaith work and social action ===
The temple's interfaith tradition dates from Stern's tenure; he founded an Institute for Clergy and Religious Educators in 1942 and organized interfaith events linked to the Pavilion of Judaism at Expo 67. According to the congregation, Martin Luther King Jr. spoke at the temple in 1962. In the 1970s the congregation sponsored a family of Vietnamese refugees, and in 2005 its social action committee, which focused on human trafficking, received the Irving J. Fain Award.

In October 2013 the temple hosted a panel discussion on the proposed Quebec Charter of Values, which Grushcow opposed. In September 2015, after Grushcow's Rosh Hashanah sermon on the Syrian refugee crisis, the temple became the first Montreal Jewish organization to commit to privately sponsoring Syrian refugees, raising close to $70,000 in its first weeks. The first sponsored family arrived on February 27, 2017. In 2022 the temple displayed outdoor portraits from the Indigenous Forced Displacement Project.

=== Cemeteries ===
The congregation acquired a section of Mount Royal Cemetery in 1900; it also has sections at the Eternal Gardens cemetery in Beaconsfield and at Lakeview Memorial Gardens.

== Antisemitic attacks ==
The temple was targeted twice in sixteen months amid a sharp rise in antisemitic hate crimes in Canada: according to Statistics Canada figures cited by La Presse, police-reported antisemitic hate crimes rose from 331 in 2020 to 920 in 2024. Grushcow and Montreal Jewish organizations described the June 2026 attack as an escalation from the 2025 vandalism. Threatening phone calls to the synagogue had also become common.

=== Swastika (2025) ===
On Saturday, February 15, 2025, during Shabbat, a two-foot-wide swastika was spray-painted on the side of the building. It was noticed that afternoon by a member leaving a rehearsal for the congregation's Purim play. Westmount public security and the Montreal police (SPVM) were called, and the graffiti was removed within 24 hours by Corey Fleischer, whose initiative Erasing Hate removes hateful graffiti. Grushcow said it was the first such incident in her thirteen years at the temple, but that given the rise in antisemitism in the city it was "not a matter of if" but when. In a video posted the next day, she asked Montrealers to reach out to their Jewish friends, to speak up against antisemitic remarks, and to visit a synagogue.

Montreal mayor Valérie Plante called the attack unacceptable, and Mark Carney, then the front-runner in the Liberal Party leadership race, said that it "has to stop". The Canadian Muslim Forum also condemned the vandalism. Westmount mayor Christina Smith announced increased attention to the city's synagogues. Police reviewed surveillance footage, but no arrest had been made as of June 2026.

=== Attempted arson (2026) ===
Shortly after midnight on June 5, 2026, police received a 911 call reporting a person trying to set fire to the synagogue. According to the SPVM, a man smashed a window and tried to start a fire inside the building before fleeing; incendiary material was found at the scene. Westmount public security officers and SPVM officers arrested a 38-year-old suspect nearby; according to Westmount mayor Michael Stern, the patrolling officers had heard the glass breaking. Early reports said that a protective film on the window kept the fire outside, and that firefighters quickly extinguished a small fire next to the building. Grushcow later said that security video showed the man repeatedly throwing a rock to break a window at the back of the building and then throwing two incendiary devices inside, filling a storeroom attached to her study with smoke. No one was hurt and the damage was minor. Federation CJA said its Community Security Network had contributed directly to the arrest.

The suspect was charged with six counts, including arson, using an explosive substance to damage property, possession of an explosive, possession of a weapon for a dangerous purpose and wearing a disguise with intent to commit an offence. His bail hearing on June 8 was postponed because a psychological assessment requested by the Crown had not been completed. No hate-related charge was laid; Grushcow said she would "eat my kippah" if the choice of a synagogue had been random, and called for a review of how hate crimes are prosecuted.

The attack came days after Prime Minister Carney's national address on antisemitism, in which he named Marc Gold, a member of the congregation, to a new advisory council on hate and racism. Stern condemned the attack and announced increased patrols around places of worship. Federation CJA and the Centre for Israel and Jewish Affairs described it as the product of a "toxic antisemitic climate", and the Reform rabbis of Canada called for full enforcement of existing hate laws and a coordinated national approach to protecting Jewish institutions. Minister of Public Safety Gary Anandasangaree attended services at the synagogue in a private visit. The congregation held its scheduled services and events, including a Pride Shabbat and an adult b'nai mitzvah, in the weeks after the attack.

Interviewed by The Canadian Press on the third anniversary of the October 7 attacks, Grushcow said she found it "deeply troubling" how much had become normalized in three years, and that the work of countering antisemitism could not fall entirely on the Jewish community.

== Rabbis ==
- Samuel Marks: 1882–1889
- S. Eisenberg: 1889–1890
- Abraham Myer Polack: 1890–1891
- A. N. Bloch: 1890–1891
- Hartog Veld: 1890–1899
- Elias Friedlander: 1899–1901
- Isaac Landman: 1901–1904
- Joseph E. Kornfeld: 1904–1906
- Nathan Gordon: 1906–1927
- Samuel Schwartz: 1917–1919
- Julius H. Halprin: 1920
- Max Merritt: 1921–1925
- Herbert J. Samuel: 1926
- Harry Joshua Stern: 1927–1972
- H. Leonard Poller: 1954–1961 (Temple Beth Sholom)
- Paul Liner: 1962–1972 (Temple Beth Sholom)
- Mark Golub: 1972–1979 (Temple Beth Sholom)
- David Powell: 1979–1980 (Temple Beth Sholom)
- Bernard Bloomstone: 1972–1983
- Louis Cashdan: 1984
- Kenneth Segal: 1984–1987
- Saul Besser: 1987–1988
- Interim rabbis: 1988–1989
- Leigh Lerner: 1989–2012; rabbi emeritus 2012–2026
- Lisa Grushcow: 2012–present

== Notable members ==
- Mortimer Davis, industrialist
- Marc Gold, senator
- Hermann Gruenwald, Holocaust survivor and author of After Auschwitz: One Man's Story

== Affiliations ==
- Union for Reform Judaism
- Association of Reform Zionists of Canada
