= Hebrew Academy (Montreal) =

Canadian Modern Orthodox Jewish day school

Coordinates: 45°28′21″N 73°39′41″W

- מדרשה עברית

Location
- 5700 Kellert Avenue; Côte Saint-Luc, Quebec, H4W 1T4, Canada

Information
- Type: Private
- Religious affiliation: Modern Orthodox Judaism
- Established: 1967; 59 years ago
- Executive Director: Laura Segall
- Head of school: Laura Segall
- Grades: K–11
- Gender: Co-educational
- Enrolment: 521 students
- Language: English, French, Hebrew
- Affiliation: AJDS
- Website: ha-mtl.org

Hebrew Academy (Hebrew: מִדְרָשָׁה עִבְרִית, French: Académie Hébraïque) is a Modern Orthodox Jewish day school in Côte Saint-Luc, Quebec, Canada. The school aims to provide an intensive program of Jewish studies integrated with a strong secular education.

== History ==
Hebrew Academy was founded in 1967 with the merger of the Adath Israel School and the Young Israel Elementary School. The Adath Israel School, situated on Ducharme Street in Outremont, was founded in 1941, while the Young Israel School on Hillsdale Road in Côte-des-Neiges was founded in 1951 as part of the Young Israel movement. Prior to the merger, the Young Israel School had limited facilities and was in need of a high school for its pupils, while the Adath Israel School faced declining enrolment.

Hebrew Academy moved to a rented space on Mackle Road in Côte Saint-Luc in 1979, and established a garderie in 1984. The school purchased the YM-YWHA's building on Kellert Road in 1990, where renovations were completed in 1992.

== Academics ==
In 2006, Hebrew Academy was recognized as a Community Learning Centre by the federal government. Hebrew Academy was ranked 26th in the province in the 2018 Fraser Institute Quebec secondary school rankings.
