= Shaare Zedek Congregation (Montreal) =

- Shaare Zedek logo

- Location in Montreal

Religion
- Affiliation: Conservative Judaism
- Ecclesiastical or organizational status: Synagogue
- Leadership: Rabbi Alan W. Bright
- Status: Active

Location
- Location: 5305 Rosedale Avenue, Notre-Dame-de-Grâce, Montreal, Quebec H4V 2H7
- Country: Canada
- Interactive map of Shaare Zedek Congregation
- Coordinates: 45°28′02″N 73°38′56″W

Architecture
- Type: Synagogue
- Completed: 1954

Website
- www.shaarezedek.ca

Shaare Zedek Congregation is a Conservative Jewish synagogue located in the residential district of Notre-Dame-de-Grâce in Montreal, Quebec, Canada.

== History ==
Founded in 1953 as the Orthodox Jewish Congregation of Western N.D.G., the synagogue was established to meet the needs of those Jewish families moving to western Montreal and to set up a Hebrew elementary school.

At first, both school and services were housed in temporary locations until land was purchased and a building constructed. The new building, on Chester in N.D.G., was ready in 1954; it was further expanded in 1962. In 1955, the school became affiliated with the United Talmud Torahs of Montreal and is now rented as a day care center. The congregation changed to the Conservative rite in 1955. The facade of the synagogue, added in 1985, depicts the Ten Commandments in blue neon lights.

In an unusual move for a conservative synagogue, in 2010 the congregation adopted a siddur endorsed by the Modern Orthodox Rabbi Jonathan Sacks.
