= Spanish and Portuguese Synagogue of Montreal =

Synagogue in Montreal, Quebec, Canada

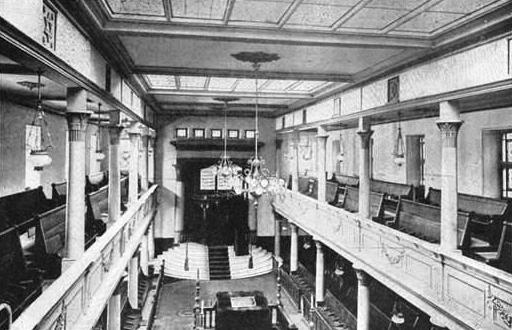
- Former Spanish and Portuguese Synagogue on Stanley Street (in use 1890–1947)

- Location in Montreal

Religion
- Affiliation: Orthodox Judaism
- Sect: Spanish and Portuguese
- Ecclesiastical or organisational status: Synagogue
- Governing body: Orthodox Union
- Leadership: Rabbi Maimon Pinto
- Status: Active

Location
- Location: 4894 Avenue Saint-Kevin, Snowdon, Montreal, Quebec
- Country: Canada
- Coordinates: 45.489802°N 73.632098°W

Architecture
- Architect: Charles T. Ballard
- Type: Synagogue
- Established: 1768; 258 years ago
- Completed: 1947

Website
- thespanish.org

The Spanish and Portuguese Synagogue of Montreal, also known as Shearith Israel, is an Orthodox synagogue, located at 4894 Avenue Saint-Kevin in Snowdon, Montreal, Quebec, Canada. The synagogue is the oldest Jewish congregation in Canada. The congregation traces its history from 1760 and was formally established in 1768. It is affiliated with the Orthodox Union.

== Architecture ==
The Congregation first assembled in a room or hall on St. James Street. By 1777 the community felt itself able to erect and support a synagogue. Lazarus David had died in 1776 but on August 14, 1777 his widow, Phoebe, sold for 1200 French livres part of David's property to three of the congregation's leading members, Samuel Judah, Simon Levy and Andrew Hays, recently married to her daughter Abigail (Branny). The building, completed the following year, stood behind a low stone wall, had a high red roof, and was located at the junction of Little St. James and Notre Dame Streets, a site now partially occupied by the Palais de justice.

The congregation's second building, also the second synagogue built in Quebec, was constructed on Chenneville Street in 1838. The Judeo-Egyptian style temple-like building had a front of cut stone, adorned with a portico with two columns. This was the only formal place for Jewish worship in Montreal until 1846. Charles T. Ballard, architect, designed a new and larger synagogue for the Spanish and Portuguese Congregation on Stanley Street in the Egyptian Revival style of architecture in 1887–1890.

The congregation has been housed in its fourth premises in Snowdon, part of Côte-des-Neiges–Notre-Dame-de-Grâce borough, since 1947.

In the sanctuary, Torah is read to the congregation from the bimah and the Torah scrolls are stored in the aron kodesh on the east wall. The congregation faces towards the east, and Jerusalem, in praying. The ornamentation features symbols such as Stars of David, signs of the zodiac and natural forms.

== Rabbinic leadership ==
- Jacob Raphael Cohen (1784–1811)
- Abraham de Sola (1846–1882)
- Meldola de Sola (1882–1918)
- Raphael Melamed (?–?)
- M. Hadad (?–?)
- Joseph Corcos (1922–1925)
- Charles Bender (1928–1940)
- Solomon Frank (1947–1982)
- Howard S. Joseph (1970–2009)
- Shachar Orenstein (2009–?)
- Avi Finegold (2017–2018)

== See also ==
- Spanish and Portuguese Jews
- Oldest synagogues in the world
- Oldest synagogues in Canada
