= Congregation Shaarey Zedek (Ontario) =

Orthodox Jewish congregation

Coordinates: 42.309084°N 83.022422°W

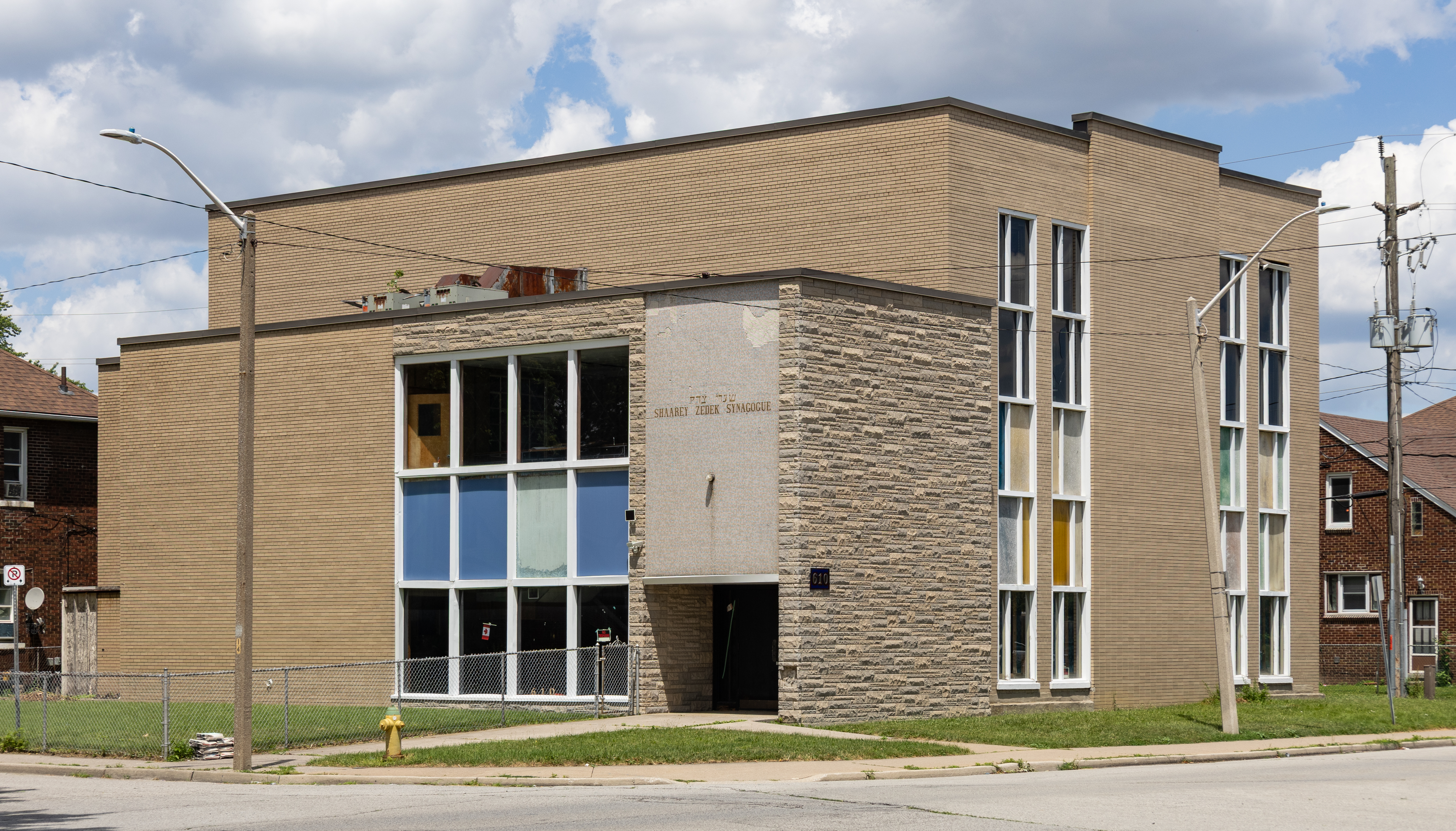
- The Shaarey Zedek Synagogue, 2025

Religion
- Affiliation: Judaism
- Rite: Orthodox Jewish
- Leadership: Rabbi Sholom Galperin
- Status: Active

Location
- Location: 115 Giles Boulevard East; Windsor, Ontario; N9A 4C1
- Interactive map of Congregation Shaarey Zedek

Architecture
- Completed: 1958

Website
- www.shaareyzedekwindsor.com

Congregation Shaarey Zedek is the oldest Orthodox Jewish congregation in Windsor, Ontario, Canada. Founded in 1893, the congregants initially met in private homes. In 1906, a dedicated synagogue was built at the corner of Brant and Mercer streets. It served the community for over 50 years. The congregation moved to its current location at 610 Giles Boulevard East in 1958.

As of 2011, Congregation Shaarey Zedek has a membership of approximately 40 families. The rabbi is Sholom Galperin.
