= List of synagogues in the Greater Toronto Area =

A list of synagogues in the Greater Toronto Area, a region with a large Jewish population. Most are located along Bathurst Street in Toronto, North York and Thornhill, but some are located in areas of newer Jewish immigrants.

Where, prior to World War II there used to be over 30 synagogues in the area in and Kensington Market, Spadina Avenue and Bathurst Street south of Bloor, today only four remain as many of the older buildings were sold when congregations relocated north of St. Clair Avenue in the 1950s and 1960s following the migration of the Jewish population up Bathurst Street.

== A ==
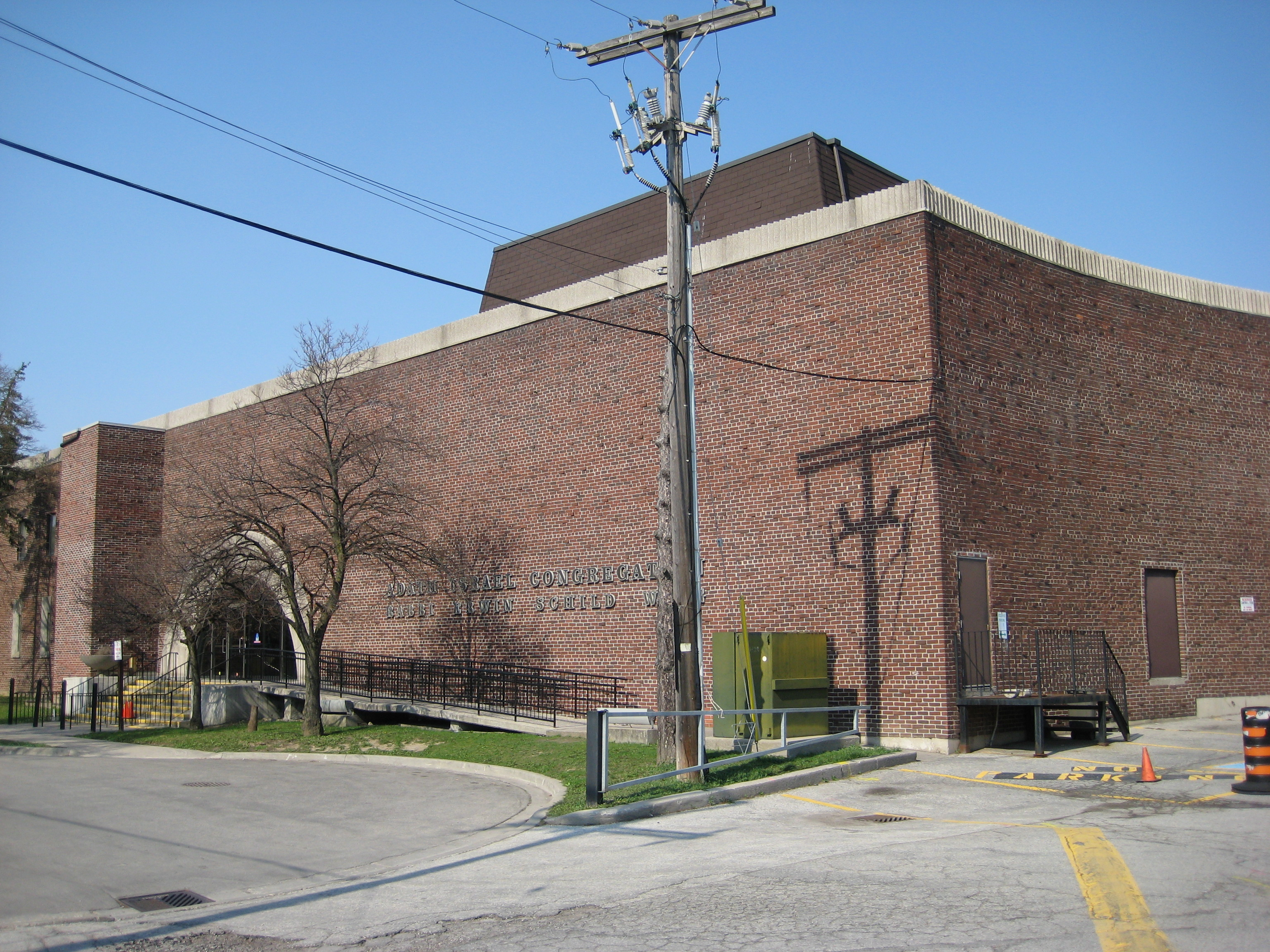
Adath Israel Congregation, Toronto

- Adath Israel Congregation, Toronto, Ontario (Conservative)
- Agudath Israel of Toronto Congregation (Orthodox)
- Agudath Israel Anshei Keltz, Toronto, Ontario (Orthodox)
- Aish HaTorah, Thornhill, Ontario (Orthodox)
- Anshei Minsk, Toronto, Ontario (Orthodox)

== B ==
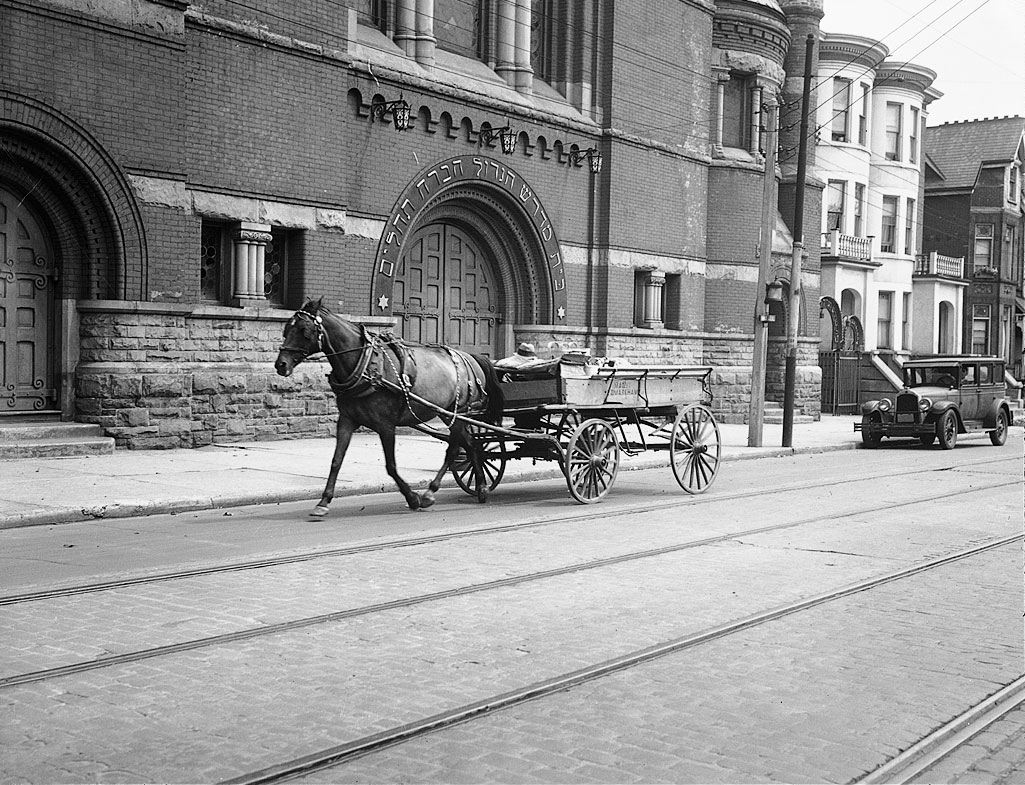
The McCaul Street Synagogue, circa 1920. In 1952, the congregation merged with Goel Tzedec Synagogue, to form Beth Tzedec, which later relocated to Bathurst Street.

- Beach Hebrew Institute, Toronto, Ontario (Conservative Egalitarian)
- Beit Rayim Synagogue, Vaughan, Ontario (Conservative Egalitarian)
- Beth Avraham Yoseph of Toronto (Modern Orthodox)
- Beth David B'nai Israel Beth Am, Toronto, Ontario (Conservative Egalitarian)
- Beth Emeth Bais Yehuda Synagogue, Toronto, Ontario (Conservative)
- Beth Jacob, Toronto, Ontario (Orthodox)
- Beth Lida Forest Hill Synagogue, Toronto, Ontario (Orthodox)
- Beth Radom Congregation, Toronto, Ontario (Conservative Egalitarian)
- Beth Sholom Synagogue, Toronto, Ontario (Conservative)
- Beth Tikvah Synagogue, Toronto, Ontario (Conservative)
- Beth Torah Congregation, Toronto, Ontario (Conservative)
- Beth Tzedec Congregation, Toronto, Ontario (Conservative)
- Beth Zion Congregation, Oshawa, Ontario (Traditional-Egalitarian)
- B'nai Shalom V'Tikvah, Ajax, Ontario (Reform)

== C ==
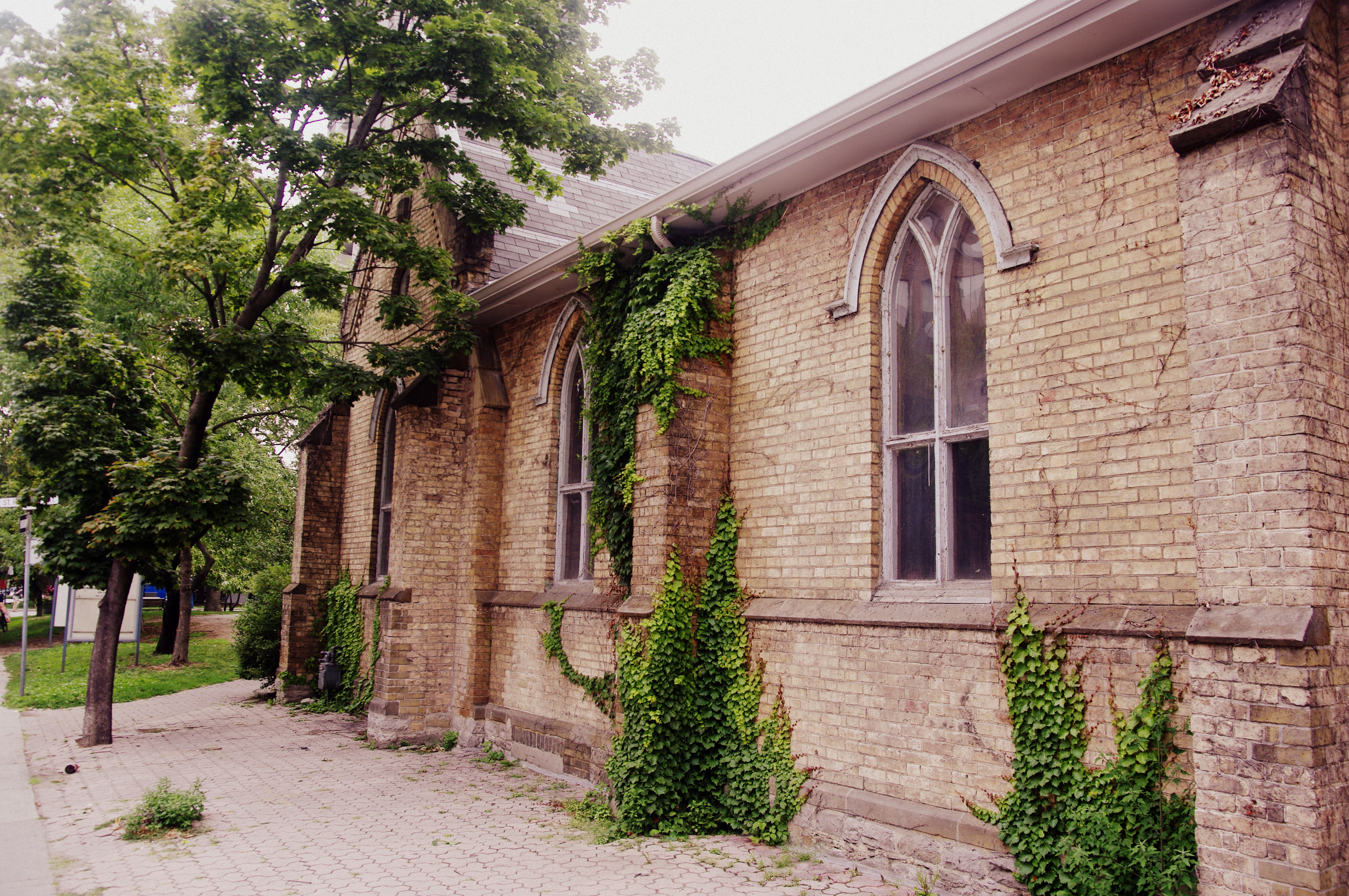
City Shul

- Chabad Downtown, Toronto, Ontario (Hasidic Orthodox)
- Chabad Flamingo, Thornhill, Ontario (Hasidic Orthodox)
- Chabad Lubavitch on the East Side, Toronto, Canada (Hasidic Orthodox)
- Chabad-Lubavitch of Markham, Markham, Ontario (Hasidic Orthodox)
- Chabad Romano Centre, Maple, Ontario (Hasidic Orthodox)
- Chabad of Durham Region, Whitby
- Chabad of Maple, Maple, Ontario (Hasidic Orthodox)
- Chabad Lubavitch Community Centre, Thornhill, Ontario (Hasidic Orthodox)
- Chevra Shas, Toronto, Ontario (Orthodox)
- City Shul, Toronto, Ontario (Reform)
- Clanton Park Synagogue, Toronto, Ontario (Orthodox)
- Congregation Beth Haminyan, Toronto, Ontario (unaffiliated, Modern Orthodox/Conservative)
- Congregation B'nai Torah, Toronto, Ontario (Orthodox)
- Congregation Chasidei Bobov, Toronto, Ontario (Bobover Chassidim Orthodox)
- Congregation Habonim Toronto (unaffiliated liberal reform)
- Congregation Shir Libeynu, Toronto, Ontario (unaffiliated liberal egalitarian)

== D ==
- Danforth Jewish Circle, Toronto, Ontario (unaffiliated liberal egalitarian)
- Darchei Noam, Toronto, Ontario (Reconstructionist)

== E ==
- Emunah Shleima Synagogue, Toronto, Ontario (Orthodox)

== F ==
- First Narayever Congregation, Toronto, Ontario (Traditional-Egalitarian)
- First Russian Congregation, "Kiever Synagogue", Toronto, Ontario (Modern Orthodox)
- Forest Hill Jewish Centre, Toronto, Ontario (Orthodox)

== H ==
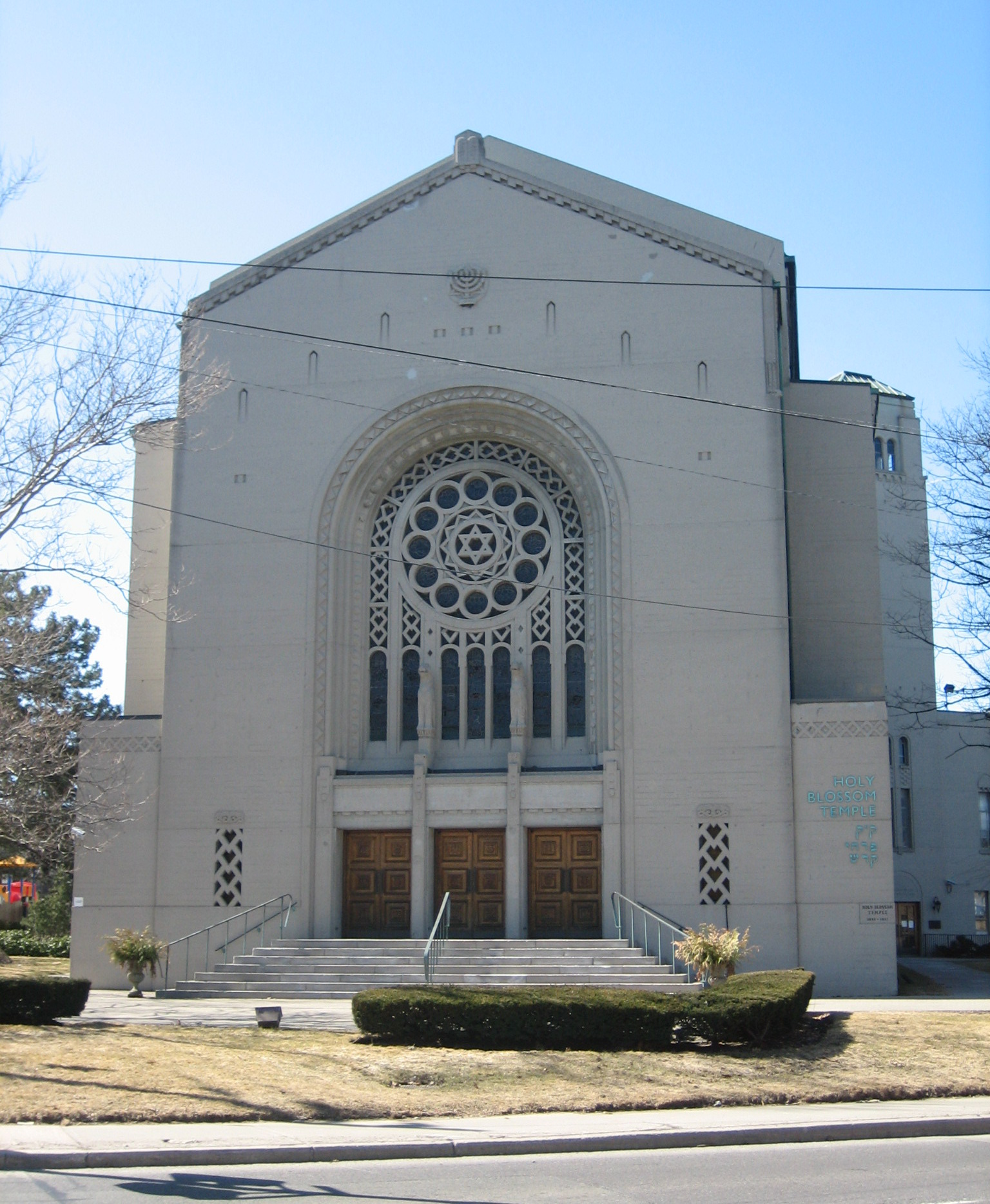
Holy Blossom Temple

- Har Tikvah Congregation, Brampton, Ontario (Reform)
- Holy Blossom Temple, Toronto, Ontario (Reform)

== J ==
- Jewish Russian Community Centres (JRCC) of Ontario (Chabad Orthodox)
- JRCC Concord (411 Confederation Pkwy #14) (Chabad Orthodox)
- JRCC Rockford (18 Rockford Rd.) (Chabad Orthodox)
- JRCC South Richmond Hill / Maple (9699 Bathurst St.) (Chabad Orthodox)
- JRCC East Thornhill (7608 Yonge St #3) (Chabad Orthodox)
- JRCC South Thornhill (28 Townsgate Dr) (Chabad Orthodox)
- JRCC West Thornhill (1136 Centre St #2) (Chabad Orthodox)
- JRCC Willowdale (17 Church St) (Chabad Orthodox)
- JRCC Woodbridge (12 Muscadel) (Chabad Orthodox)
- JRCC Bathurst & Sheppard (4455 Bathurst St) (Chabad Orthodox)

== K ==
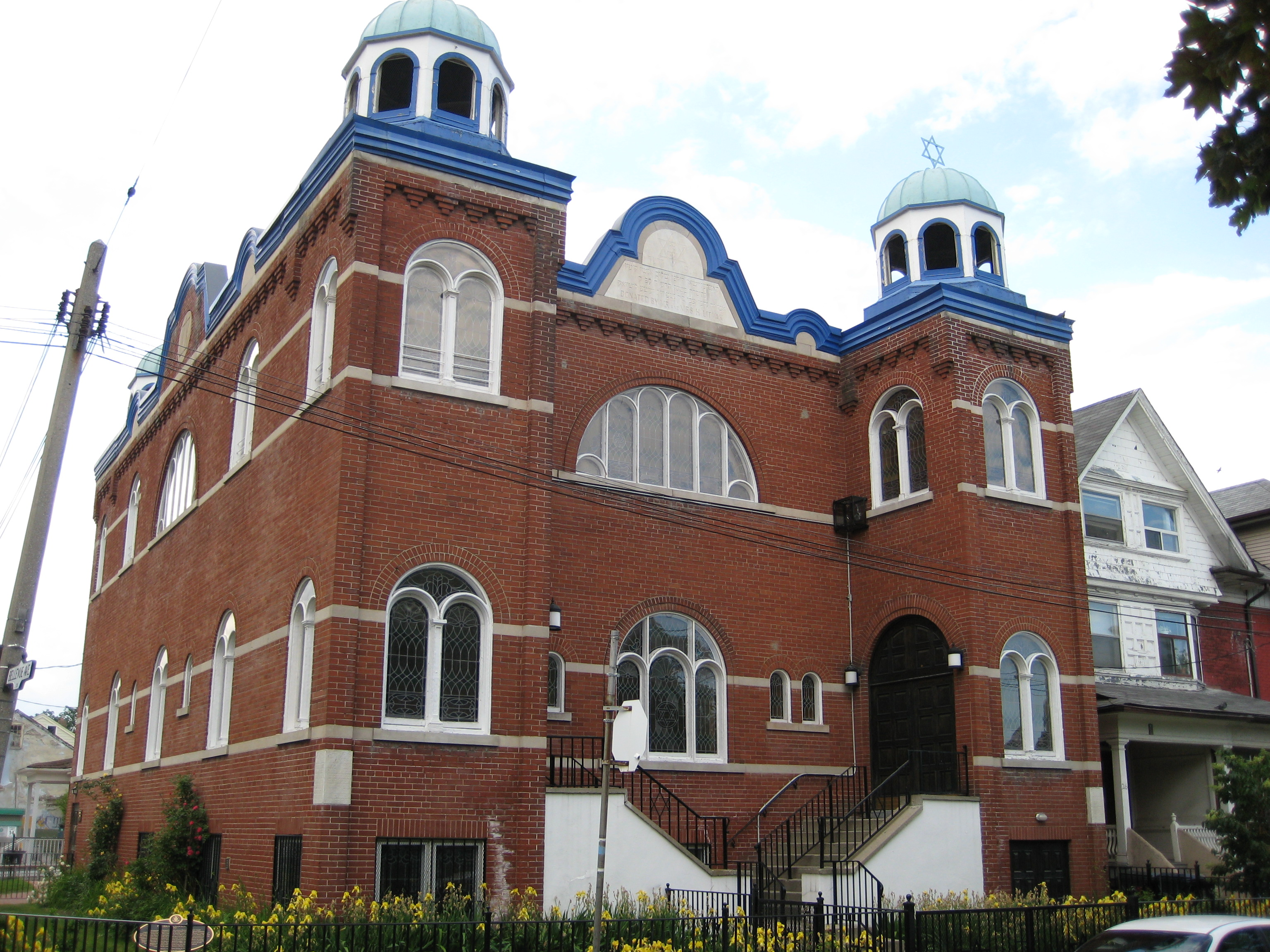
Kiever Synagogue, Toronto

- Kehila Centre, Thornhill, Ontario (Orthodox)
- Kehillat Shaarei Torah, Toronto, Ontario (Modern Orthodox)
- Knesseth Israel, Toronto, Ontario (Orthodox)
- Kol Torah, Thornhill, Ontario (Orthodox)
- Khal Toras Chesed, Toronto, Ontario (Orthodox)
- Kol Yisroel Congregation, Toronto, Ontario (Conservative)

== L ==
- Lodzer Centre Congregation, Toronto, Ontario (Conservative)

== M ==
- Magen David Sephardic Congregation, Toronto, Ontario (Shephardic)
- Makom: Creative Downtown Judaism, Toronto (Open Orthodox)
- Maon Noam Synagogue, Toronto, Ontario (Orthodox)
- Mishkan Avraham, Toronto, Ontario (Orthodox)

== O ==
- Oraynu Congregation, Toronto, Ontario (Humanist)
- Or Hadash Synagogue, Newmarket, Ontario (Reform)

== P ==
- Petah Tikva Anshe Castilla, Toronto, Ontario (Shephardic/Orthodox)
- Pride of Israel Synagogue, Toronto, Ontario (Traditional-Conservative)

== R ==
- The Richmond Hill Country Shul, Richmond Hill, Ontario (Orthodox)

== S ==
- Shaarei Beth-El Synagogue, Oakville, Ontario (Reform)
- Shaarei Shomayim Congregation, Toronto, Ontario (Orthodox)
- Shaarei Tefillah Congregation, Toronto, Ontario (Modern Orthodox)
- Shaarei Tzedec Synagogue (The Markham Shul), Toronto, Ontario (Orthodox)
- Shomrai Shabbos Synagogue, Toronto, Ontario (Orthodox)
- Solel Congregation of Mississauga, Mississauga, Ontario (Reform)
- The Song Shul, Toronto, Ontario (unaffiliated, Traditional-Egalitarian)
- Stashover-Slipia Congregation, Toronto, Ontario (unaffiliated, Traditional-Egalitarian)

== T ==
- Temple Emanu-El, Toronto, Ontario (Reform)
- Temple Har Zion, Thornhill, Ontario (Reform)
- Temple Kol Ami, Vaughan, Ontario (Reform)
- Temple Sinai Congregation of Toronto (Reform)
- Tent City Jewish Congregation, Innisfil, Ontario (unaffiliated)
- Thornhill Woods Shul, Thornhill, Ontario (Orthodox)
- Tiferet Israel Congregation, Toronto, Ontario (Shephardic)
- Torah Emeth Congregation, Toronto, Ontario (Orthodox)

== V ==
- The Village Shul, Toronto, Ontario (Orthodox)

== W ==
- Westmount Shul and Learning Centre, Thornhill, Ontario (Orthodox)

== See also ==
- History of the Jews in Toronto
- List of Jewish cemeteries in the Greater Toronto Area
