= Pidvysoke, Ternopil Oblast =

Rural locality in Ternopil Oblast, Ukraine

Coordinates: 49°23′25″N 24°47′33″E

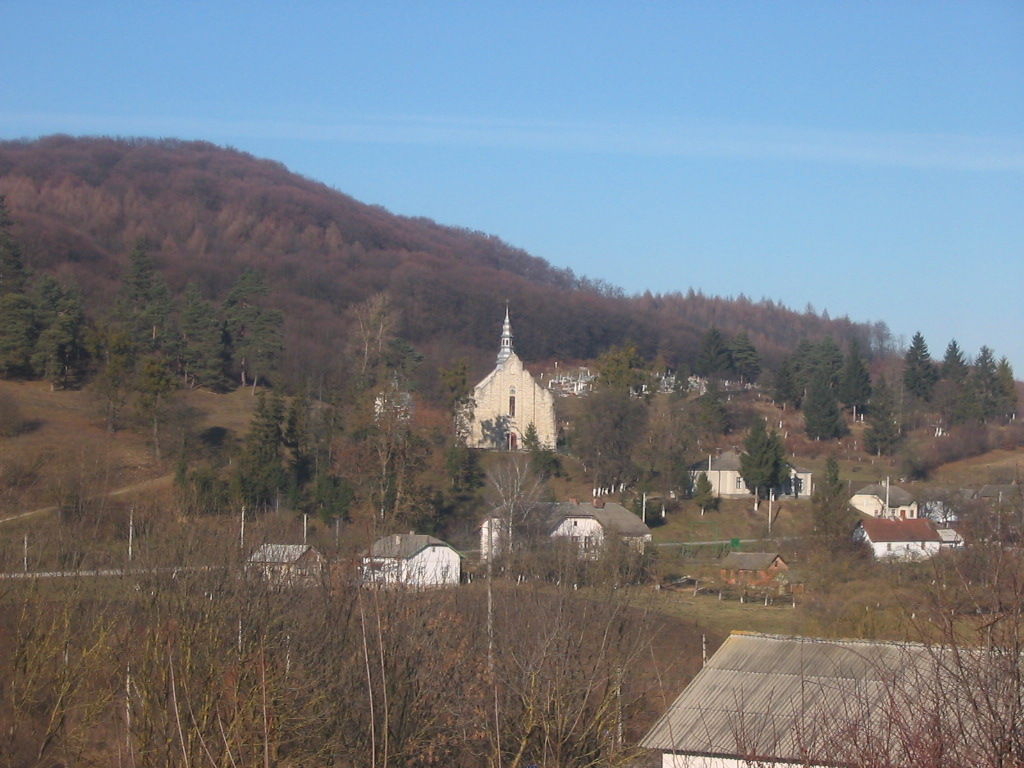
Pidvysoke church and the upper, older part of the village

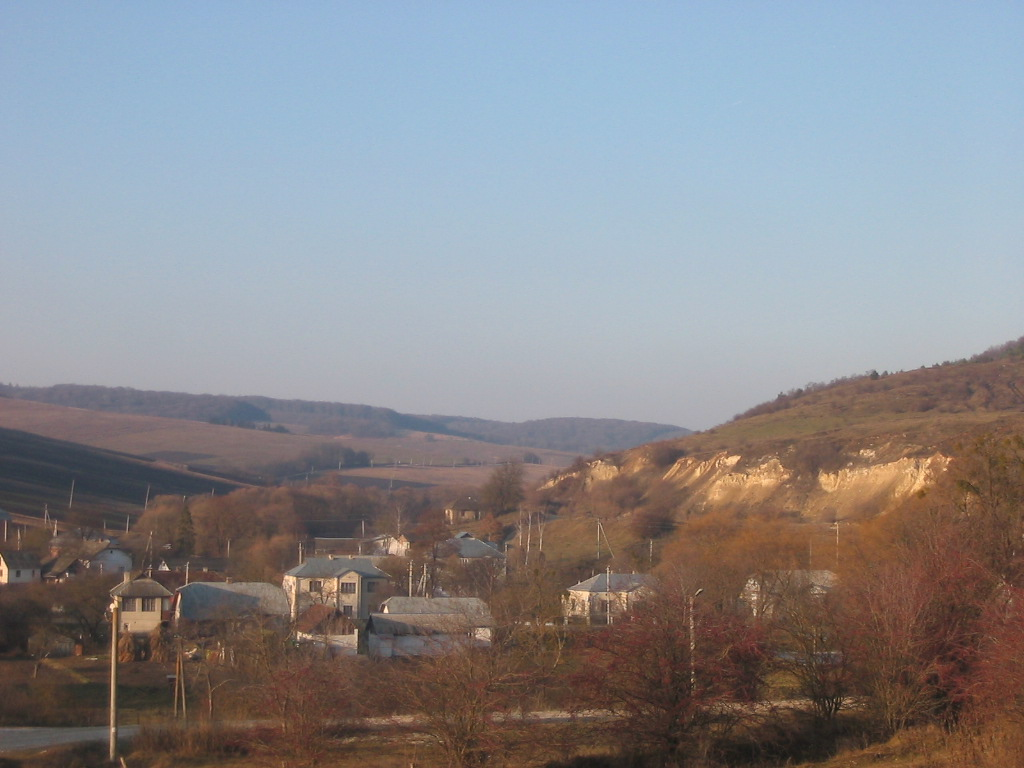
View over the lower part of Pidvysoke

Pidvysoke (Ukrainian: Підвисоке, Polish: Podwysokie) is a village of 317 people in Ternopil Raion of Ternopil Oblast in western part of Ukraine. It is situated along the valley of river Narayivka with forested hills (of about 400 meters above sea level) on both sides of the village. It is the first village when entering Ternopil Raion and Ternopil Oblast by highway Stryi-Kirovohrad from the side of Rohatyn and Ivano-Frankivsk Oblast. There is an important railway station and junction in the village as well as Pidvysoke limestone slaking factory. Vast deposits of limestone are nearby. Pidvysoke belongs to Naraiv rural hromada, one of the hromadas of Ukraine.

Population in 1900 (Austrian census) was 473 inhabitants (including 19 Jews).

== History ==
Monuments from the early Bronze Age have been found near Pidvysoke.

- In 1524, certain Martin and his cousin Fedko (Theodore) having returned from the Turkish captivity, obtained rights for hereditary possession of Pidvysoke.
- In 1548 the village was owned by Jakub Wysocki and in 1578 Pidvysoke belonged to Ivan, son of Mykhaylo and Ivan, son of Vasko Pidvysotsky.
- In 1595 king Sigismund of Poland permitted to Ivan (Jan) Vysocki to establish here the town of Pidvysoke using Magdeburg privileges.
- In 1626 the town rights of Pidvysoke were reconfirmed by the Polish king.
- In 1626, 80% of the town was destroyed by the invasion of Crimean Tatars.
- In 1853 the stone Polish Roman Catholic church was built. The church was closed by Soviets but in 1991 it was renovated again and reconverted into Ukrainian Greek-Catholic church, still functioning today.

Until 18 July 2020, Pidvysoke belonged to Berezhany Raion. The raion was abolished in July 2020 as part of the administrative reform of Ukraine, which reduced the number of raions of Ternopil Oblast to three. The area of Berezhany Raion was merged into Ternopil Raion.

== Village data ==
- Territory: 1.15 km^{2}
- Population density: 265.65 persons per km^{2}.
- Postal index 47523
- Telephone code +380 3548
- Distance to district center of Berezhany - 16 km

== Nearby villages ==
- Lopushnia
- Kuriany
- Demnia
- Hutysko
- Rohachyn

== Gallery ==
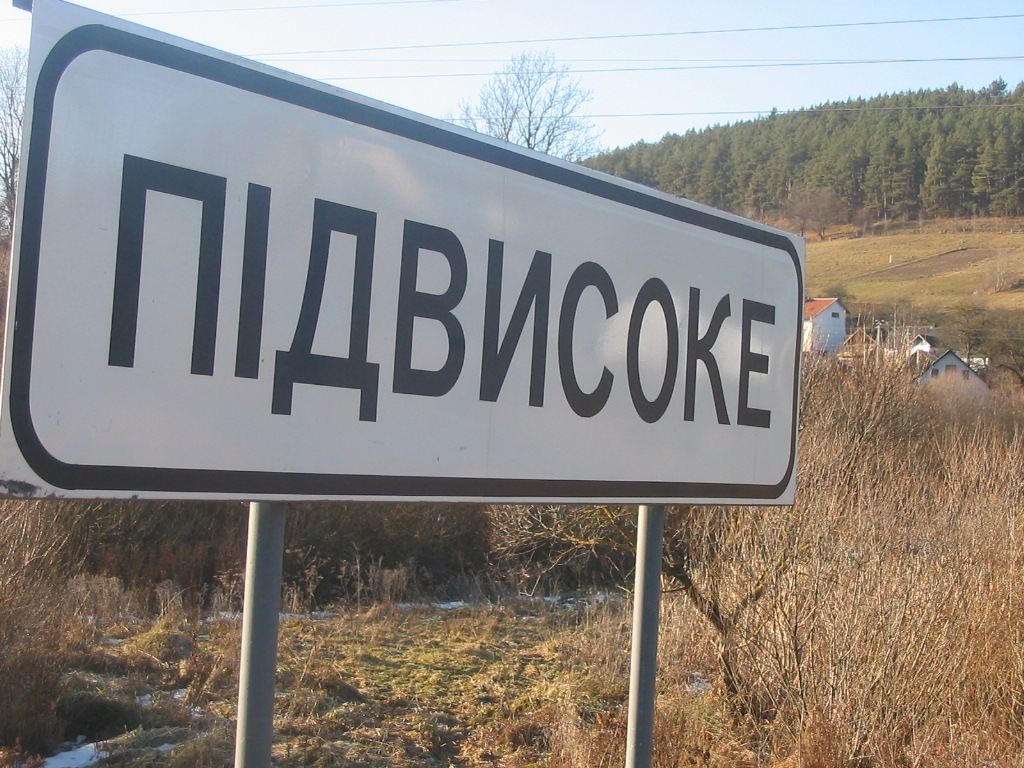

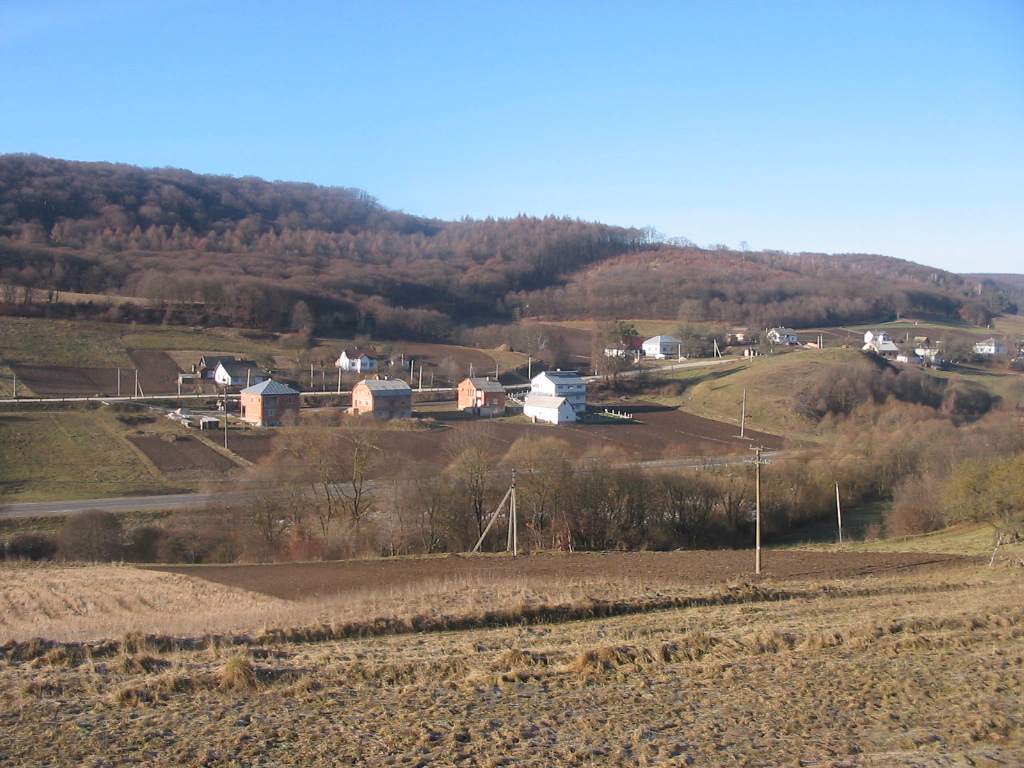

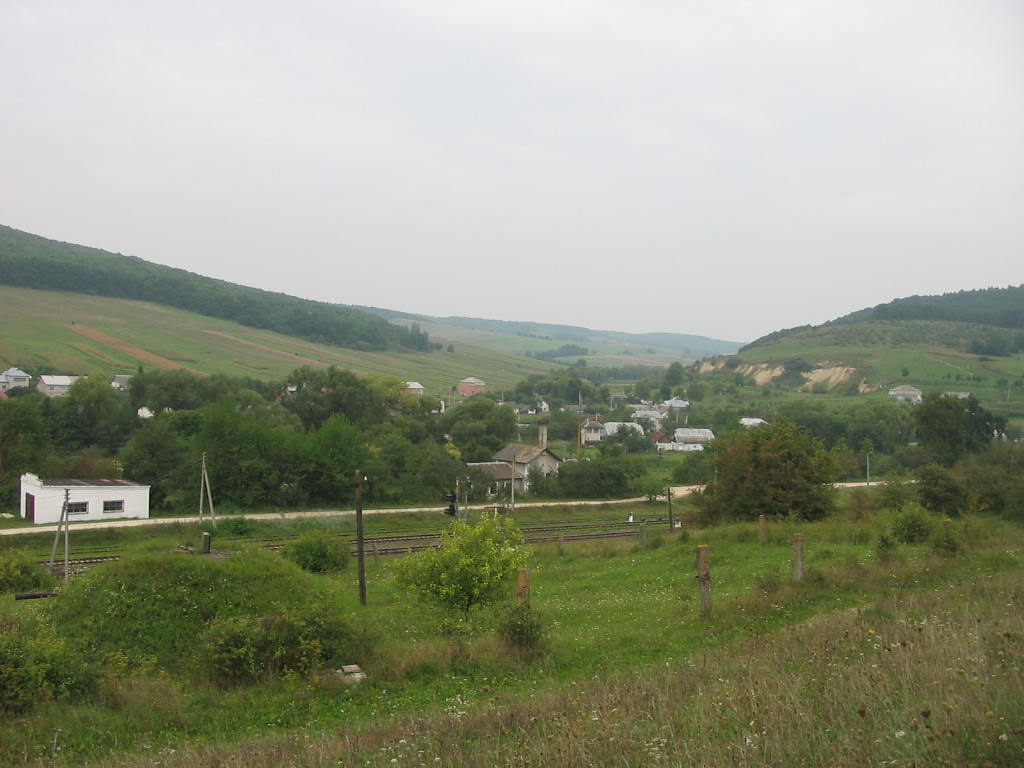

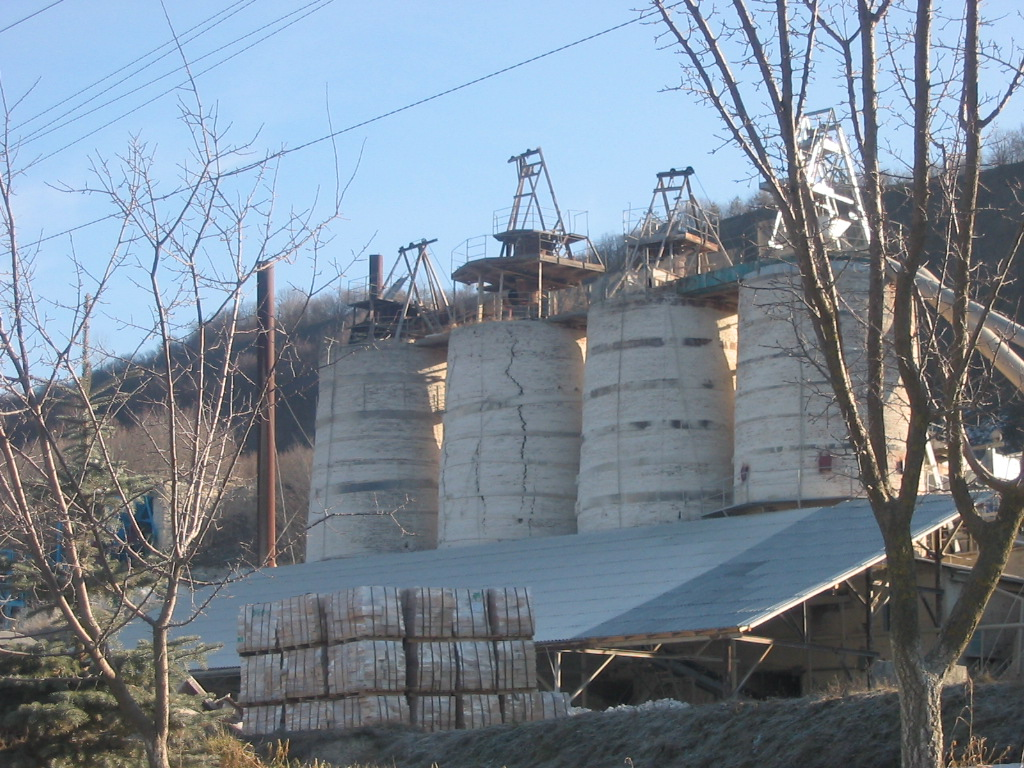

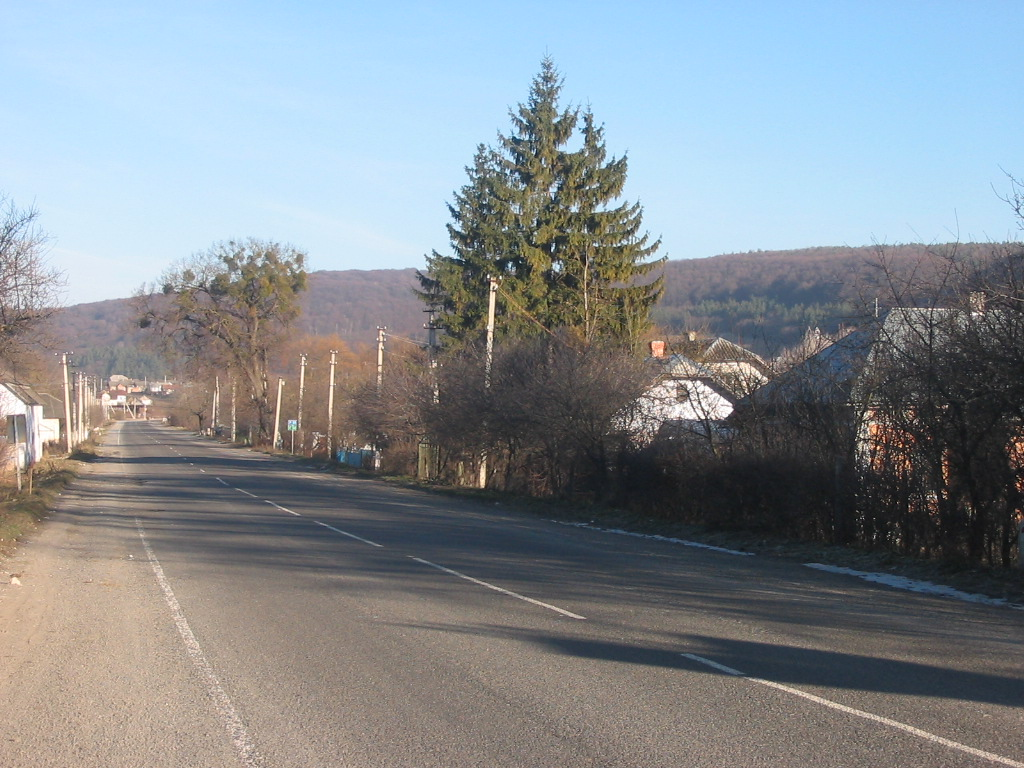

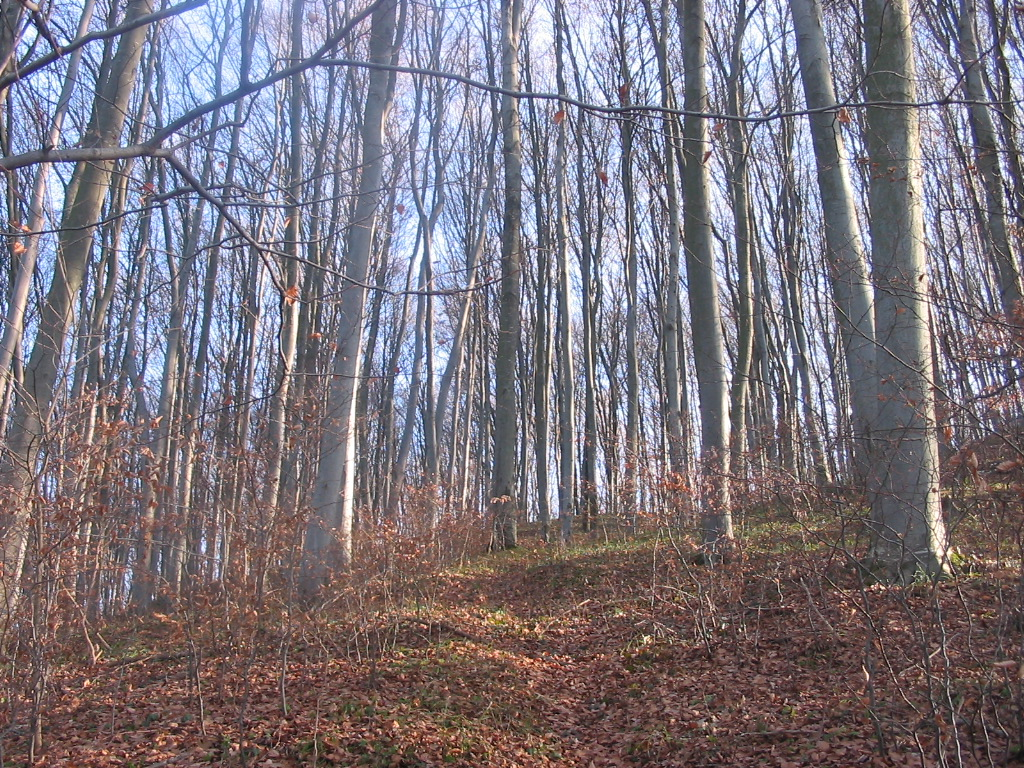

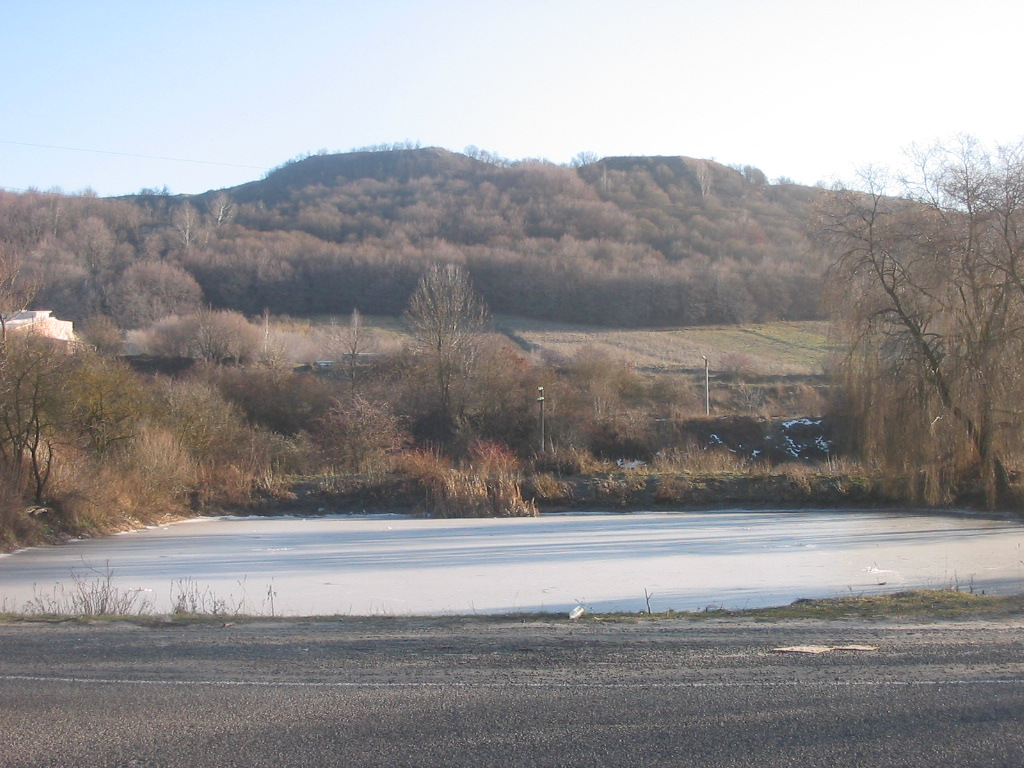

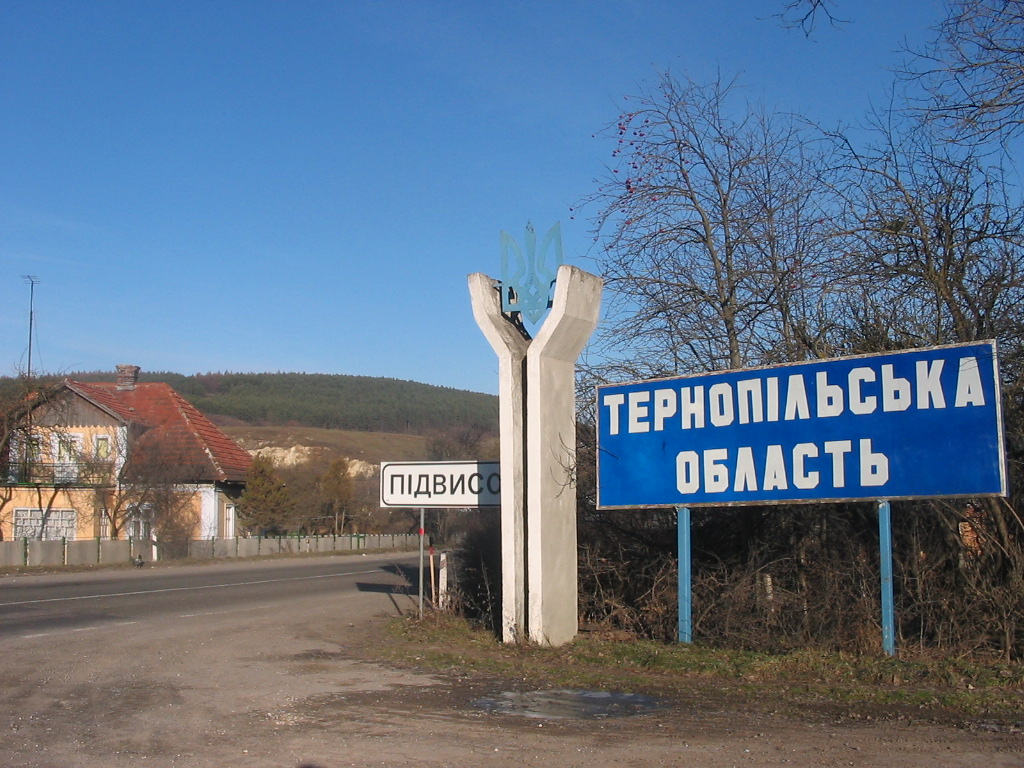

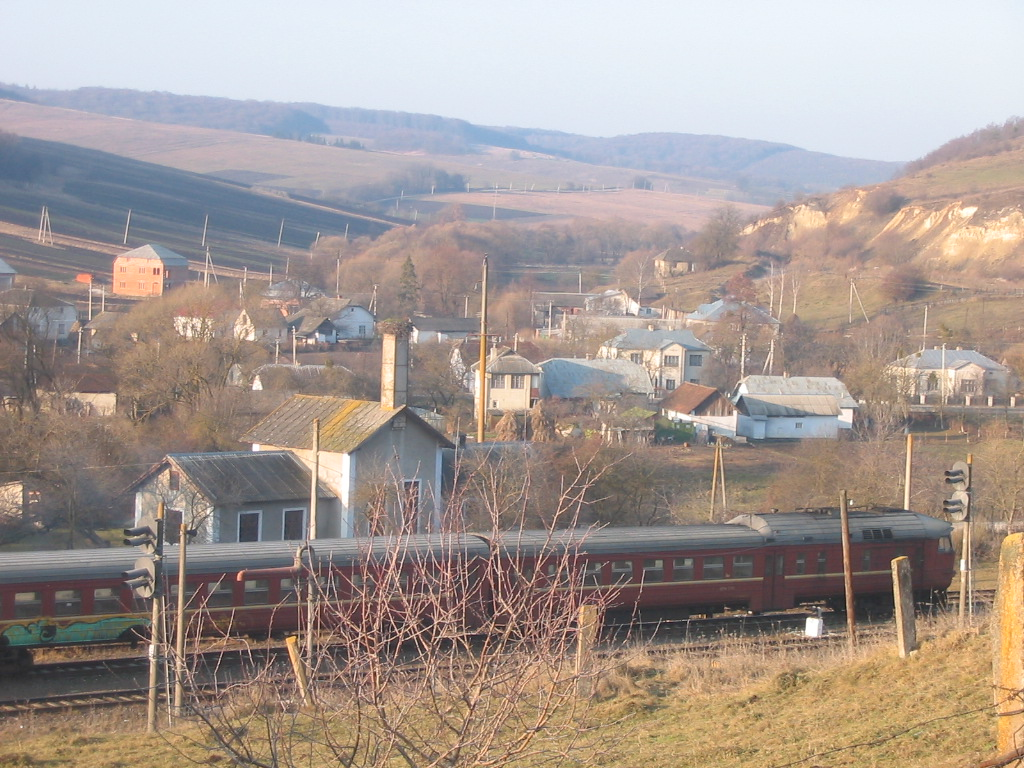

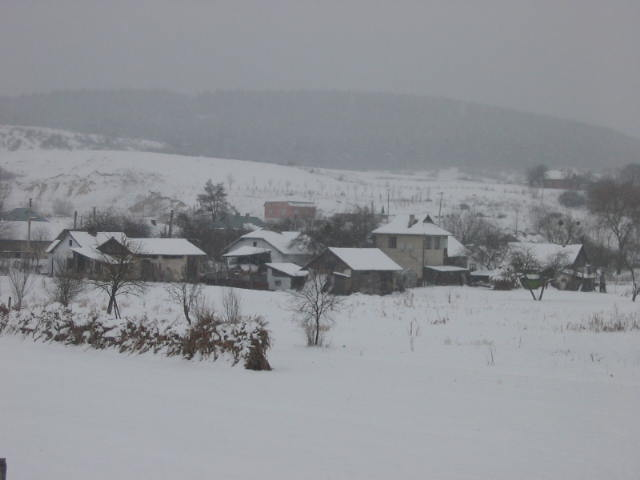

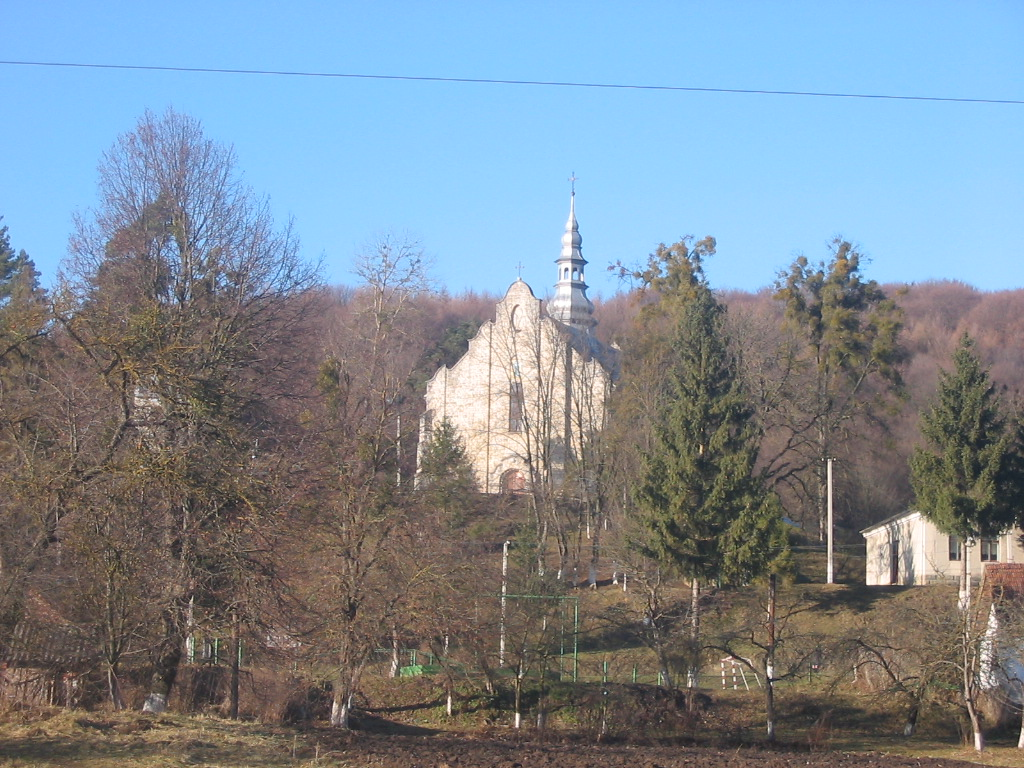

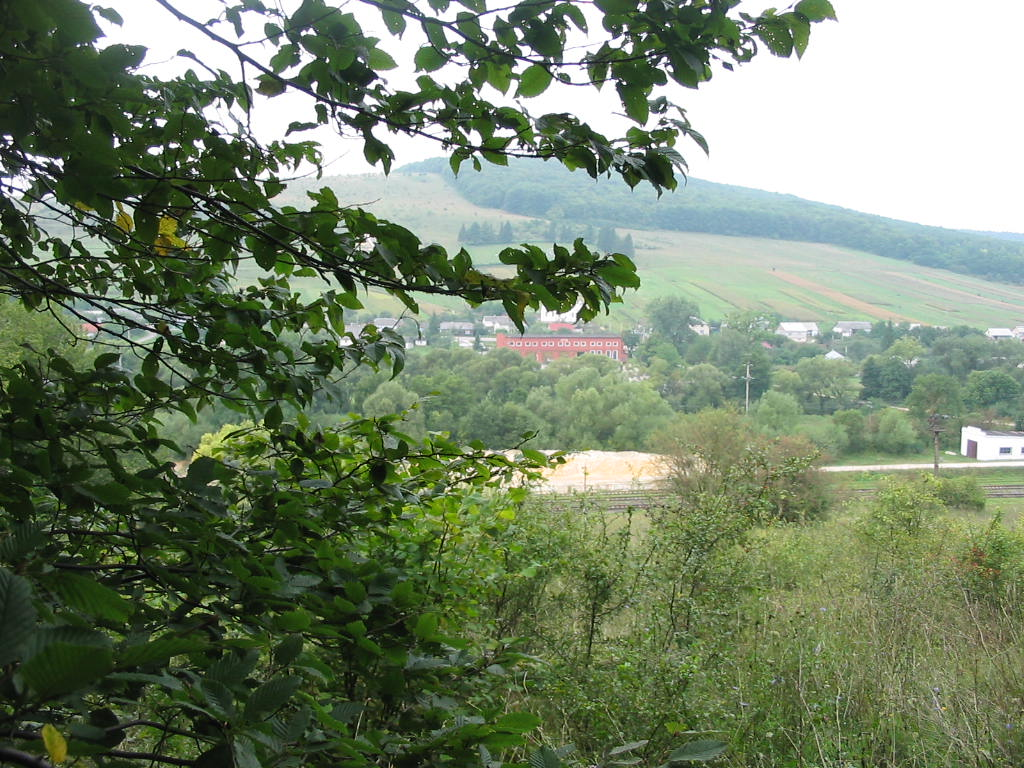
