= Shaibivka =

Rural locality in Ternopil Oblast, Ukraine

Shaibivka Шайбівка
- Location in Ternopil Oblast
- Coordinates: 49°31′50″N 24°44′28″E
- Country: Ukraine
- Oblast: Ternopil Oblast
- Raion: Ternopil Raion
- Hromada: Naraiv rural hromada
- Time zone: UTC+2 (EET)
  - Summer (DST): UTC+3 (EEST)
- Postal code: 47513

Shaibivka (Ukrainian: Шайбівка) is a village in Naraiv rural hromada, Ternopil Raion, Ternopil Oblast, Ukraine.

== History ==
The village has been known from the 19th century as a nown of Naraiv.

After the liquidation of the Berezhany Raion on 19 July 2020, the village became part of the Ternopil Raion.

== Sources ==
- (in Ukrainian) Гнатишин В., Шайбівка // Ternopil Encyclopedic Dictionary: in 4 v. / editorial board: H. Yavorskyi and other, Ternopil: "Zbruch", 2008, V. 3: П—Я, S. 621. — ISBN 978-966-528-279-2.
- "Szajbówka (1), pow. brzeżański". Geographical Dictionary of the Kingdom of Poland (in Polish). 11. Warszawa: Kasa im. Józefa Mianowskiego. 1890. p. 768.
