= Pysarivka =

Pysarivka or Pisarivka may refer to:

- Pysarivka, Ternopil Oblast, Ukraine
- Pysarivka, Sumy Oblast, Ukraine
- Velyka Pysarivka Raion, a former raion in Sumy Oblast
  - Velyka Pysarivka, Okhtyrka Raion, Sumy Oblast, Ukraine
