= Kehillat Shaarei Torah =

Modern Orthodox synagogue in Toronto, Canada

- Hebrew: קהילת שערי תורה
- Location of the synagogue in Toronto

Religion
- Affiliation: Modern Orthodox Judaism
- Ecclesiastical or organizational status: Synagogue
- Leadership: Rabbi Joe Kanofsky
- Status: Active

Location
- Location: 2640 Bayview Avenue, North York, Toronto, Ontario
- Country: Canada
- Interactive map of Kehillat Shaarei Torah
- Coordinates: 43°45′14″N 79°23′08″W

Website
- shaareitorah.com

The Kehillat Shaarei Torah (Hebrew: קהילת שערי תורה) is a Modern Orthodox Jewish congregation and synagogue, located at 2640 Bayview Avenue, in the North York district of Toronto, in Ontario, Canada.

The rabbi, since 2009, has been Rabbi Joe Kanofsky.

== History ==
The congregation was established in November 1980 by Jews from South Africa who had emigrated to Canada during the late 1970s.

In 2024, the synagogue was vandalized twice. On April 19, five windows were broken. On May 17, a masked person in a sweatshirt was seen on camera breaking doors and windows. The attack was investigated by the Hate Crime Unit of the Toronto Police Service.

== See also ==
- History of the Jews in Toronto
- List of synagogues in the Greater Toronto Area
