= Stryhantsi, Ternopil Oblast =

Rural locality in Ternopil Oblast, Ukraine

Stryhantsi Стриганці
- Location in Ternopil Oblast
- Coordinates: 49°33′41″N 24°51′15″E
- Country: Ukraine
- Oblast: Ternopil Oblast
- Raion: Ternopil Raion
- Hromada: Naraiv rural hromada
- Time zone: UTC+2 (EET)
  - Summer (DST): UTC+3 (EEST)
- Postal code: 47511

Stryhantsi (Ukrainian: Стриганці) is a village in Naraiv rural hromada, Ternopil Raion, Ternopil Oblast, Ukraine.

== History ==
The first written mention of the village was in 1579.

After the liquidation of the Berezhany Raion on 19 July 2020, the village became part of the Ternopil Raion.

== Religion ==
- Saint Nicholas church (1837, brick, OCU).

== Sources ==
- (in Ukrainian) Пришляк В., Стриганці // Ternopil Encyclopedic Dictionary: in 4 v. / editorial board: H. Yavorskyi and other, Ternopil: "Zbruch", 2008, V. 3: П—Я, S. 371. — ISBN 978-966-528-279-2.
- "Stryhańce 1.) wś, powiat brzeżański". Geographical Dictionary of the Kingdom of Poland (in Polish). 11. Warszawa: Kasa im. Józefa Mianowskiego. 1890. p. 427.
