= Haiok, Ternopil Oblast =

Rural locality in Ternopil Oblast, Ukraine

Haiok Гайок
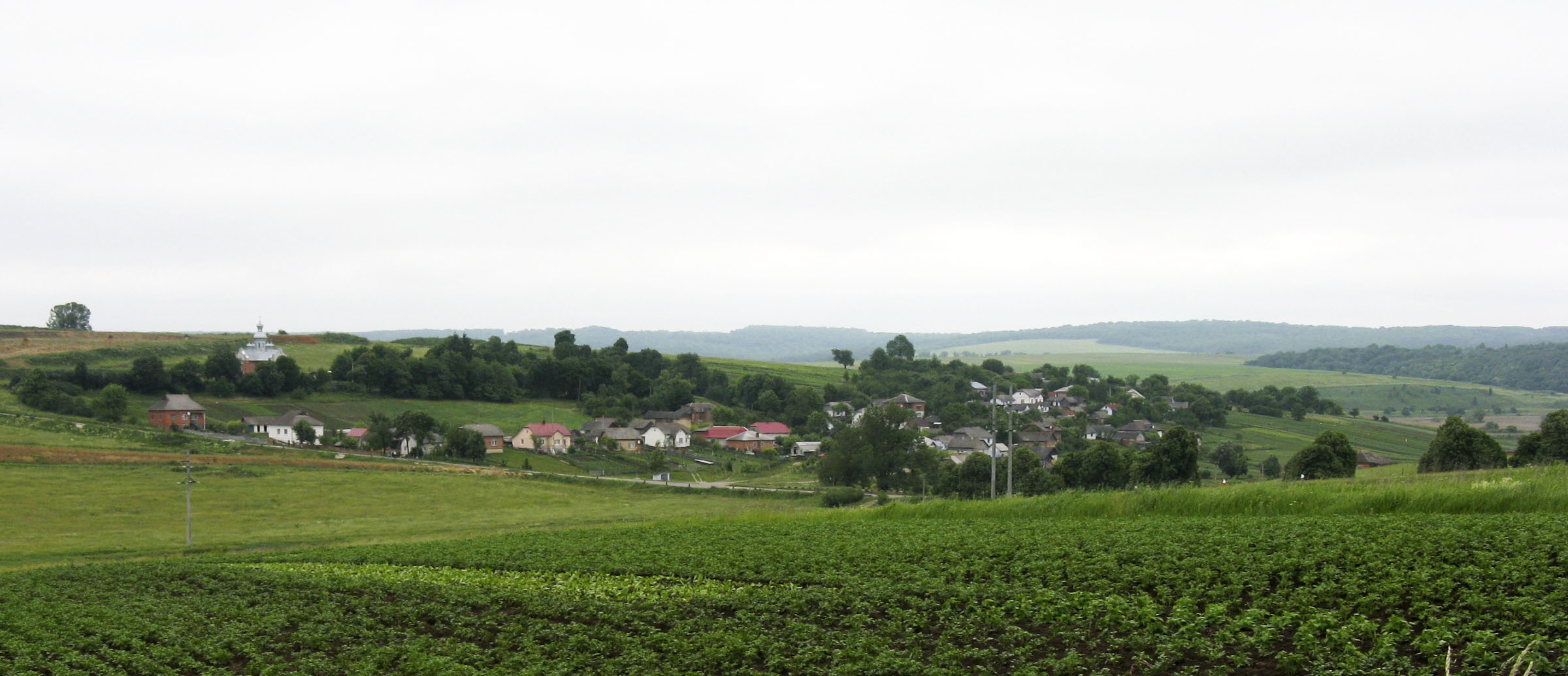
- Panorama of the village of uk:Hayok, Berezhany district. Panorama of the village of Hayok from the road uk:Berezhany - uk:Narayiv

- Location in Ternopil Oblast
- Coordinates: 49°28′31″N 24°55′24″E
- Country: Ukraine
- Oblast: Ternopil Oblast
- Raion: Ternopil Raion

Population (2001)
  - Total: 167
- Time zone: UTC+2 (EET)
  - Summer (DST): UTC+3 (EEST)
- Postal code: 47517
- Area code: +380 3548

Haiok (Ukrainian: Гайок) is a village in Ternopil Raion of Ternopil Oblast, Ukraine. It belongs to Naraiv rural hromada, one of the hromadas of Ukraine.

Until 18 July 2020, Haiok belonged to Berezhany Raion. The raion was abolished in July 2020 as part of the administrative reform of Ukraine, which reduced the number of raions of Ternopil Oblast to three. The area of Berezhany Raion was merged into Ternopil Raion.

== Population ==
- Population in 2001: 167 inhabitants.

== Sources ==
- (in Ukrainian) В. Ханас., Гайок // Ternopil Encyclopedic Dictionary: in 4 v. / editorial board: H. Yavorskyi and other, Ternopil: "Zbruch", 2004, V. 1: А—Й, S. 325. — ISBN 966-528-197-6.
