= Rohachyn =

Rural locality in Ternopil Oblast, Ukraine

Coordinates: 49°28′N 24°47′E

Rohachyn (Ukrainian: Рогачин, Polish Rohaczyn, Russian Rogachin) is a village (of 886 people) in Ternopil Raion (district) of Ternopil Oblast (province) in western Ukraine (the historic region of Eastern Galicia). It belongs to Naraiv rural hromada, one of the hromadas of Ukraine. The first historical mention dates to 1578, when Rohachyn mentioned as property of B. Narajowski.

Until 18 July 2020, Rohachyn belonged to Berezhany Raion. The raion was abolished in July 2020 as part of the administrative reform of Ukraine, which reduced the number of raions of Ternopil Oblast to three. The area of Berezhany Raion was merged into Ternopil Raion.

Rohachyn lies in the valley of Narayivka river on its way between Narayiv and Kuryany. The village is situated ab. 11 km from the city of Berezhany (district center) and 7 km from Narayiv. The closest railway station is in Pidvysoke, 9 km. away.

There is a glass factory producing primarily glass bottles. The glass has been produced here during the last 200 years. There are also sand mines near Rohachyn, the sand being the material for glass manufacture. The village is located opposite to another village, Volytsya (popularly known as Vulka). The name Rohachyn come from the word "Rohach" (several meanings), ultimately from "Roh" - horn. There are 2 churches: Church of St. George (1956) and the Church of the Most Holy Theotokos, Queen of Ukraine (1934, renovated in 1995).

Postal code is 47520.

== Population ==
- 886 inhabitants (2001)

== Notable people ==
- Vasyl Chornyi, is a Ukrainian footballer.
