= Pavliv, Ternopil Oblast =

Rural locality in Ternopil Oblast, Ukraine

Pavliv Павлів
- Location in Ternopil Oblast
- Coordinates: 49°26′39″N 24°48′55″E
- Country: Ukraine
- Oblast: Ternopil Oblast
- Raion: Ternopil Raion
- Hromada: Naraiv rural hromada
- Time zone: UTC+2 (EET)
  - Summer (DST): UTC+3 (EEST)
- Postal code: 47522

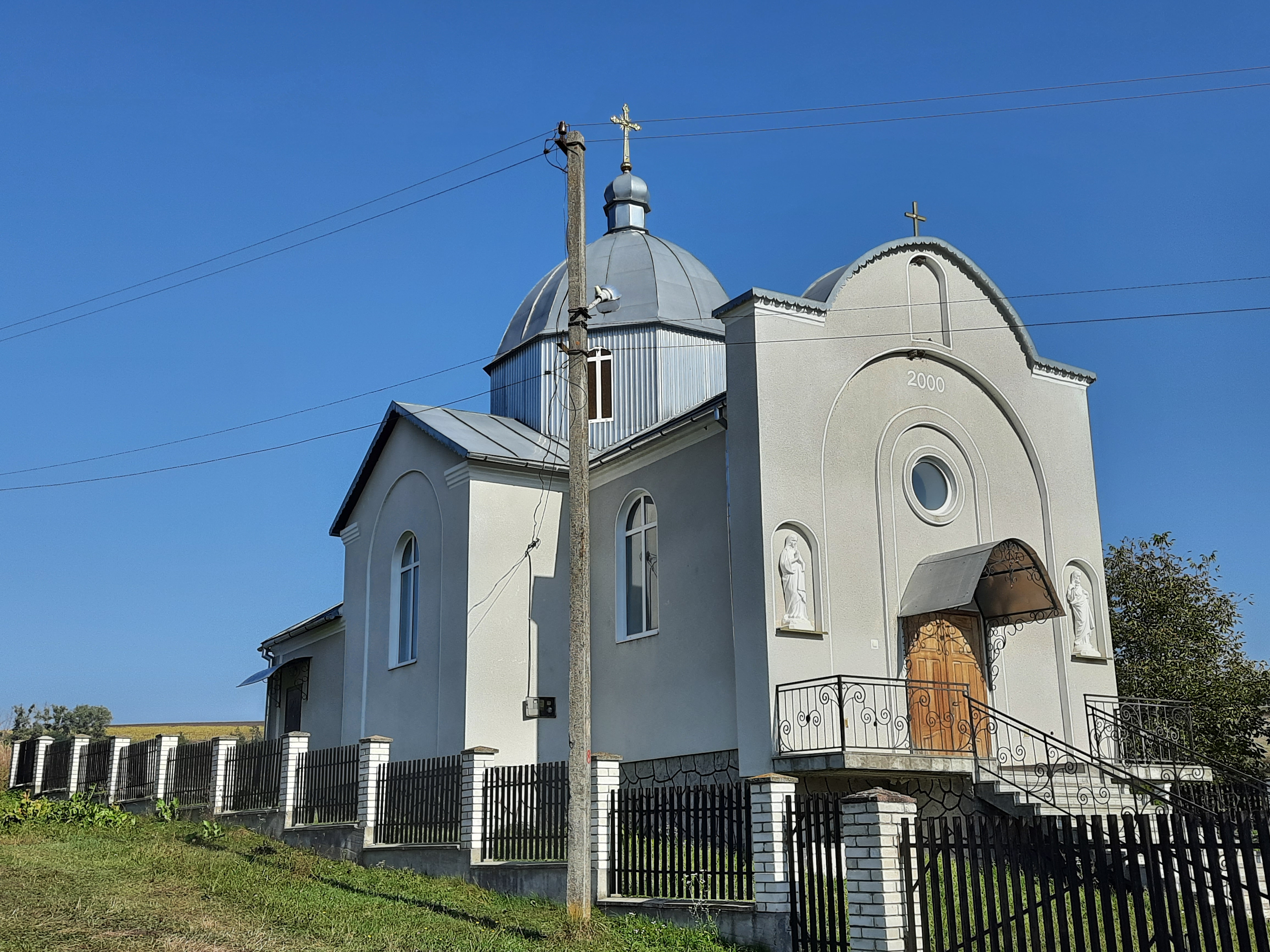
Church of the Holy Great Martyr Demetrius of Pavlov Ternopil district, Ternopil region

Pavliv (Ukrainian: Павлів) is a village in Naraiv rural hromada, Ternopil Raion, Ternopil Oblast, Ukraine.

== History ==
The first written mention of the village was in 1443.

After the liquidation of the Berezhany Raion on 19 July 2020, the village became part of the Ternopil Raion.

== Religion ==
- Saint Demetrius church (2010),
- Redemptorist Fathers' Monastery (2007).

== Sources ==
- (in Ukrainian) Бей В., Уніят В., Павлів // Ternopil Encyclopedic Dictionary: in 4 v. / editorial board: H. Yavorskyi and other, Ternopil: "Zbruch", 2008, V. 3: П—Я, S. 9. — ISBN 978-966-528-279-2.
- "Pawłów (pow. brzeżański)". Geographical Dictionary of the Kingdom of Poland (in Polish). 7. Warszawa: Kasa im. Józefa Mianowskiego. 1886. p. 906.
