= First Narayever Congregation =

Religion
- Affiliation: Judaism
- Leadership: Rabbi Ed Elkin
- Status: Active

Location
- Location: 187 Brunswick Avenue, Toronto, Ontario, Canada
- Interactive map of First Narayever Congregation
- Coordinates: 43.66288°N 79.40590°W

Architecture
- Architects: unknown (original), Richard Seligman (subsequent), ERA and LGA Architects (2023 renovation)
- Completed: 1885/2023
- Capacity: 220

Website
- narayever.ca

First Narayever Congregation is an unaffiliated traditional-egalitarian synagogue located at 187 Brunswick Avenue, in the Harbord Village neighbourhood of Toronto, Ontario, Canada. It is the largest Jewish congregation in downtown Toronto. It was founded by the Jewish immigrants from Narayiv, western Ukraine, hence the Yiddish name "Narayever".

Founded by 1914 as an Orthodox synagogue by Galician immigrants to Toronto, it was a landsmanshaft, an association whose members had immigrated from the same town, in this case, the town of Naraiev. The congregation originally met in a rented building at the corner of Huron and Dundas. In 1943, the congregation acquired and moved to its current building on Brunswick which had previously been the Mennonite Bethel Church and was originally built as a Foresters' Lodge in the 1885. It and the Orthodox Shaarei Tzedec are the two last remaining shtiebels of what were once dozens of small congregations in the area around Kensington Market, Spadina Avenue and Bathurst Street - which was a vibrant Jewish area prior to World War II.

In the decades following World War II, many of the congregants followed the rest of the Jewish community as it moved up Bathurst Street north of St. Clair Avenue, but some continued to travel downtown to attend the synagogue. Other Jews who had remained in the neighbourhood began attending after their own synagogues moved north. Younger professionals and more liberal members joined the congregation in the 1970s and 1980s and, after the older generation retired from the synagogue's board in 1983, an alternative egalitarian service was introduced downstairs while the Orthodox service continued in the main sanctuary. The decision to allow egalitarian services that grant women an equal role in services, such as allowing them to count in minyans, participate in readings from the Torah was reported to be the first case of an Orthodox synagogue doing so in Canada. The move resulted in an unsuccessful legal challenge by some older members.

The failure of the legal challenge resulted in some older congregants moving to one of the three other remaining Orthodox synagogues in the area. As attendance for the Orthodox service dwindled to the point that it was unable to attract a minyan, the egalitarian service moved upstairs and the synagogue began attracting more new members and went in a new direction, and is today unaffiliated with any larger Jewish religious movement.

The Narayever's congregation grew from 30 families in 1988 to having to hold High Holiday services at the Jewish Community Centre a decade later to accommodate 1,500 attendees, 40% of whom were Narayver members. By 2025, membership consisted of 763 adults and 328 children, the largest congregation in downtown Toronto. Narayever today follows traditional halakha except in making no distinction on the basis of gender. The Lev Shalem siddur forms the basis of the liturgy. In 2009, the congregation voted to endorse the celebration of same-sex marriages.

Rabbi Solomon Langner was Narayever's full-time rabbi from 1923 until 1929, and remained its spiritual leader until his death in 1973. Chezi Zionce was the Narayever's spiritual leader from 1986 to 1998. Ed Elkin has been the congregation's rabbi since 2000.

From 2020 to 2023, the building underwent a major redesign and renovation.

== See also ==
=== Other downtown unaffiliated liberal congregations ===
- Beach Hebrew Institute
- Congregation Shir Libeynu
- Danforth Jewish Circle

=== Other downtown legacy synagogues ===
- Anshei Minsk
- Kiever Synagogue
- Shaarei Tzedec
