= Duliaby =

Rural locality in Ternopil Oblast, Ukraine

Duliaby Дуляби
- Location in Ternopil Oblast
- Coordinates: 49°30′46″N 24°43′34″E
- Country: Ukraine
- Oblast: Ternopil Oblast
- Raion: Ternopil Raion

Population (2021)
  - Total: 4
- Time zone: UTC+2 (EET)
  - Summer (DST): UTC+3 (EEST)
- Postal code: 47513
- Area code: +380 3548

Duliaby (Ukrainian: Дуляби) is a village in Ternopil Raion of Ternopil Oblast, Ukraine. It belongs to Naraiv rural hromada, one of the hromadas of Ukraine.

Until 18 July 2020, Duliaby belonged to Berezhany Raion. The raion was abolished in July 2020 as part of the administrative reform of Ukraine, which reduced the number of raions of Ternopil Oblast to three. The area of Berezhany Raion was merged into Ternopil Raion.

== Population ==
- Population in 2014: 39 inhabitants with over 15 houses.

== Sources ==
- (in Ukrainian) Є. Здебський, М. Федечко, Дуляби // Ternopil Oblast. History of cities and villages: in 3 v. / Ternopil: "Terno-graph", 2014, V. 1: А—В, S. 382. — ISBN 978-966-457-228-3.
