= Naraiv rural hromada =

Rural hromada in Ternopil Oblast, Ukraine

Naraiv rural hromada Нараївська сільська громада
- hromada
- Location within Ternopil Oblast Location within Ukraine
- Coordinates: 49°31′45″N 24°46′27″E
- Country: Ukraine
- Oblast: Ternopil Oblast
- Raion: Ternopil Raion
- Administrative center: Naraiv

Government
  - Hromada head: Yevhen Zdebskyi

Area
  - Total: 218.1 km^{2} (84.2 sq mi)

Population (2022)
  - Total: 6,656
- Villages: 18
- Website: naraivska.gromada.org.ua

Naraiv rural territorial hromada (Ukrainian: Нараївська територіальна громада, romanized: Naraivska silska terytorialna hromada) is a hromada in Ukraine, in Ternopil Raion of Ternopil Oblast. The administrative center is the village of Naraiv. Its population is 6,656 (2022 estimate) Established on 5 April 2019.

== Settlements ==
The hromada consists of 18 villages:

- Verbiv
- Volytsia
- Haiok
- Hutysko
- Dvirtsi
- Demnia
- Duliaby
- Kuriany
- Lapshyn
- Naraiv
- Pavliv
- Pysarivka
- Pidvysoke
- Potochany
- Rekshyn
- Rohachyn
- Stryhantsi
- Shaibivka
