= Naraiv =

Rural locality in Ternopil Oblast, Ukraine

Coordinates: 49°31′45″N 24°46′27″E

Naraiv Нараїв
- Village
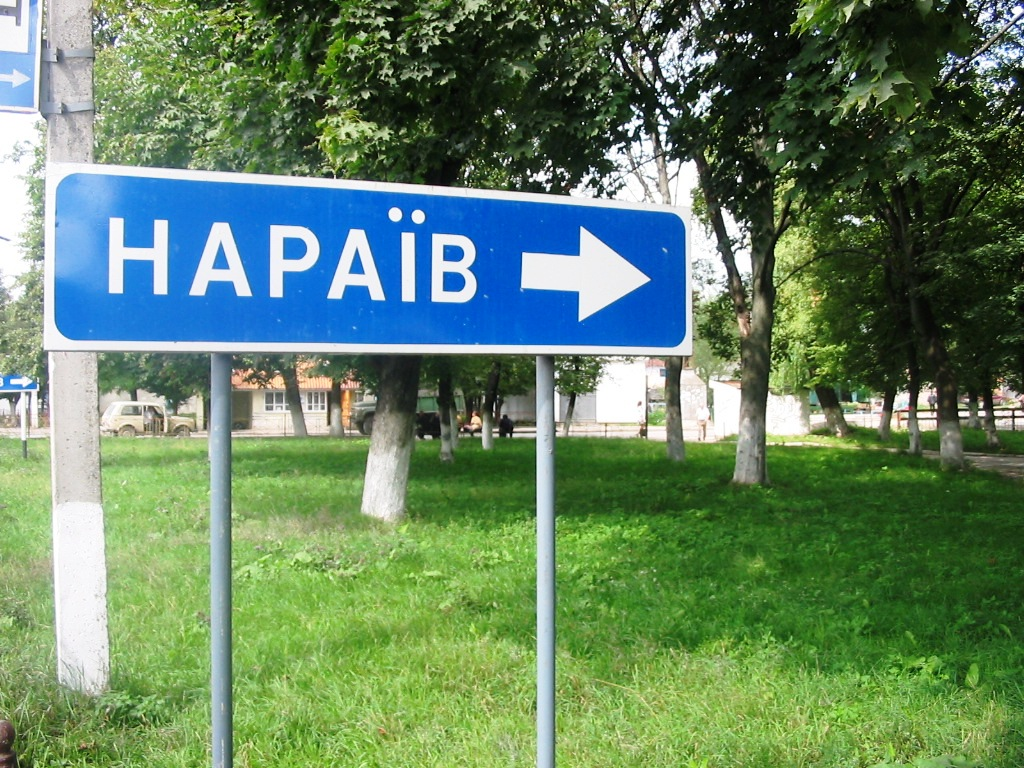
- Road turn sign for Naraiv in Berezhany, west Ukraine
- Interactive map of Naraiv
- Country: Ukraine
- Oblast: Ternopil Oblast
- Raion: Ternopil Raion
- Hromada: Naraiv rural hromada
- First mention: 1445

Population
  - Total: 1,799

Naraiv (Note: Also transliterated Narayiv or Narajiv (Ukrainian: Нараїв; Polish: Narajów; Yiddish: נאראיעוו, romanized: Narayev; Hebrew: נאראיוב, romanized: Narayuv)) is a selo in Ternopil Raion of Ternopil Oblast, Ukraine. It hosts the administration of Naraiv rural hromada, one of the hromadas of Ukraine.

Naraiv is within Eastern Galicia, former Austrian empire (until 1918). In the past it was a town. The first historical mention dates to 1445. Naraiv is situated along the small river of Naraivka, a tributary of Zolota Lypa in a picturesque natural surrounding of vast beech and hornbeam forests and fertile rolling hills (western part of Podolian Upland, ethno-geographic area of Galician Opillia).

Until 18 July 2020, Naraiv belonged to Berezhany Raion. The raion was abolished in July 2020 as part of the administrative reform of Ukraine, which reduced the number of raions of Ternopil Oblast to three. The area of Berezhany Raion was merged into Ternopil Raion. Naraiv was the largest rural locality (of 1,799 people) in the raion.

Naraiv lies on the road between Berezhany and Peremyshliany, right in the middle between the two cities, and consists of 2 parts - Naraiv Misto (Naraiv the town) and Naraiv Selo (Naraiv the village).

== Population ==
Currently Naraiv has 1,799 inhabitants, mostly Galician Ukrainians.

In 1900, "Naraiv Town" had 2,851 inhabitants. Among those were: 1,451 Ukrainians/Ruthenians (Greek Catholics), 458 Poles (Roman Catholic faith), 928 Jews and 14 others. In 1939, "Naraiv Town's" population numbered already 3910 inhabitants. Among them 1,980 Ukrainians (Greek-Catholics), 520 Poles (Roman Catholic faith), 330 Roman Catholics (Ukrainians/Poles), 30 Polish colonizers newcomers and 780 Jews.

In 1900, "Naraiv Selo" had 1,139 inhabitants. Among them: 856 Ukrainians, 205 Poles and 78 Jews and some decades later in 1939 it grew to 1740 inhabitants. Among them: 1,160 Ukrainians, 25 Poles, 330 Roman Catholics (Ukrainians/Poles), 200 Polish colonizers newcomers and 25 Jews.

== Jewish and Polish communities ==
Prior to the war there was a Jewish community in Naraiv of 805 Jews (in 1939), the most of whom were annihilated during the Holocaust. Some survivors immigrated in Israel. Around 1945, most of the local Poles (775) had been deported to western Poland.

The First Narayever Congregation, a Jewish synagogue in downtown Toronto, was founded in 1914 by Jewish immigrants from Naraiv in the early 20th century.

=== Holocaust in Naraiv ===
In the autumn of 1942, the day after Yom Kippur holiday, the brutal German soldiers arrived from Berezhany gathering all the Naraiv Jews who were not able to find a hideout and took them by trucks to Berezhany. From there to the Belzec Death Camp in Belzec, Poland. After about a month and a half, the Naraiv was declared "Judenfrei".

== Communications ==
There are daily bus connections between Naraiv and Berezhany, as well as between Naraiv and Lviv. Direct daily buses for Naraiv leave from the secondary bus terminal at the end of Lychakivska Street in Lviv or the daily bus route (twice a day) for Berezhany (which stops at Naraiv) from the main city terminal in Lviv.

Postal code for Naraiv is 47513.

The closest international airports to Naraiv, in the order of proximity, are:

- Lviv International Airport, in Lviv (LWO), 66 km away
- Ivano-Frankivsk International Airport, in Ivano-Frankivsk (IFO), 72 km away
- Chernivtsi International Airport, in Chernivtsi (CWC), 161 km away
- Rzeszów International Airport, in Rzeszów (RZE), Poland, 207 km. away

== Nearby locations ==
The direct line distances between Naraiv and nearby locations. Road distances might be slightly longer.

- Rohachyn - 7,8 km.
- Kuriany - 11,3 km.
- Urman - 13,7 km.
- Berezhany - 15 km., district center
- Pomoriany - 16 km.
- Rohatyn - 17 km.
- Peremyshliany - 21,5 km.
- Svirzh - 27 km.
- Kozova - 29 km.
- Zolochiv - 31 km.
- Ternopil - 59 km., regional center
- Lviv - 63 km., the biggest city in the entire region
- Ivano-Frankivsk - 68 km., second biggest city in the region

== Notable people ==
- Moyshe Nadir, Jewish Yiddish language writer
- Jackie Kahane, Canadian-American comedian
