= Lapshyn, Ternopil Oblast =

Rural locality in Ternopil Oblast, Ukraine

Lapshyn Лапшин
- Location in Ternopil Oblast Lapshyn (Ukraine)
- Coordinates: 49°29′19″N 24°55′11″E
- Country: Ukraine
- Oblast: Ternopil Oblast
- Raion: Ternopil Raion

Population (2001)
  - Total: 1,152
- Time zone: UTC+2 (EET)
  - Summer (DST): UTC+3 (EEST)
- Postal code: 47517
- Area code: +380 3548

Lapshyn (Ukrainian: Лапшин) is a village in Ternopil Raion of Ternopil Oblast, Ukraine. It belongs to Naraiv rural hromada, one of the hromadas of Ukraine.

Until 18 July 2020, Lapshyn belonged to Berezhany Raion. The raion was abolished in July 2020 as part of the administrative reform of Ukraine, which reduced the number of raions of Ternopil Oblast to three. The area of Berezhany Raion was merged into Ternopil Raion. Edward Rydz-Śmigły Marshal of Poland, was born here.

== Population ==
- Population in 2001: 1152 inhabitants with over 366 houses.

== Gallery ==
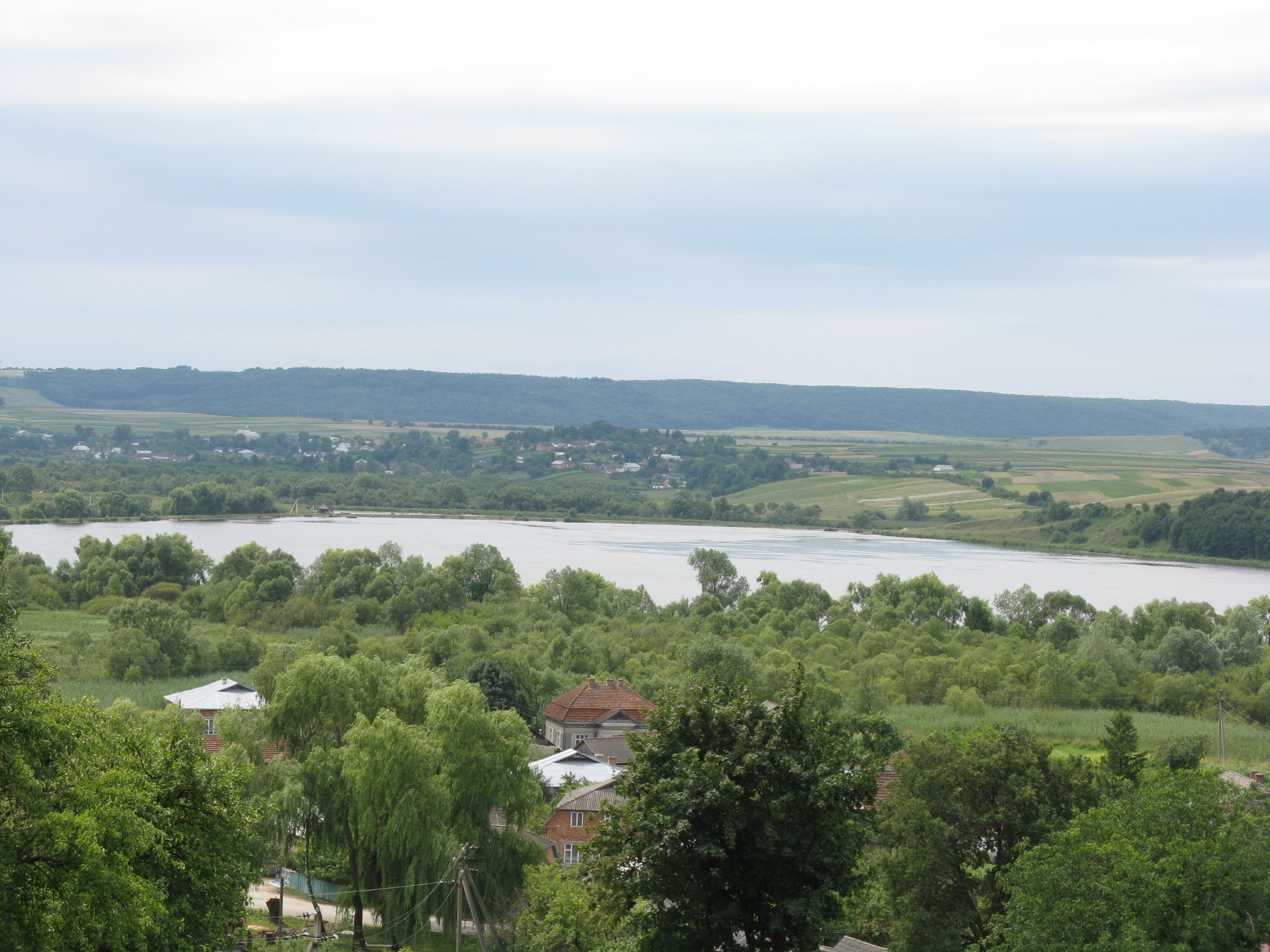
View Lapshyn

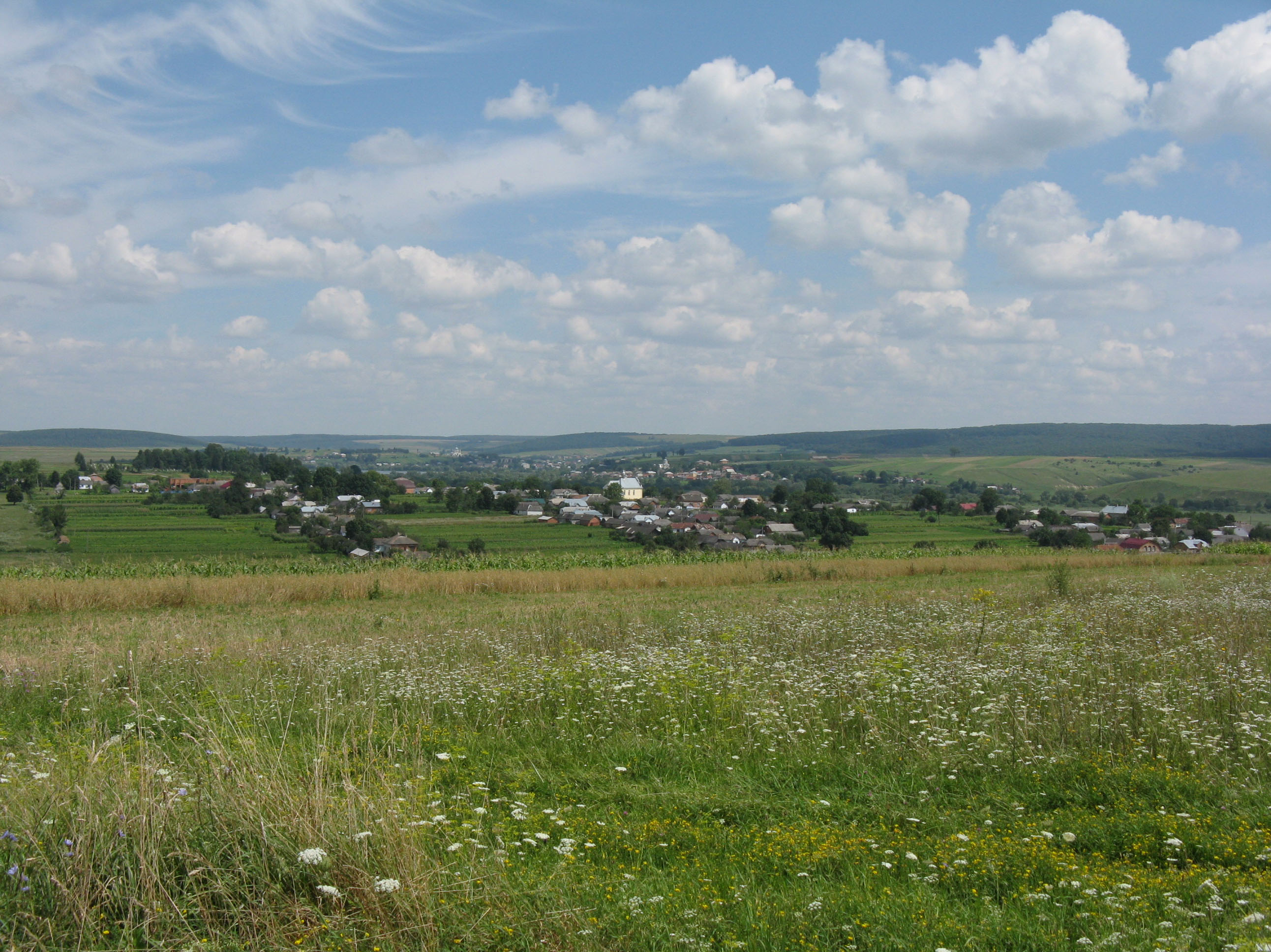
View Lapshyn

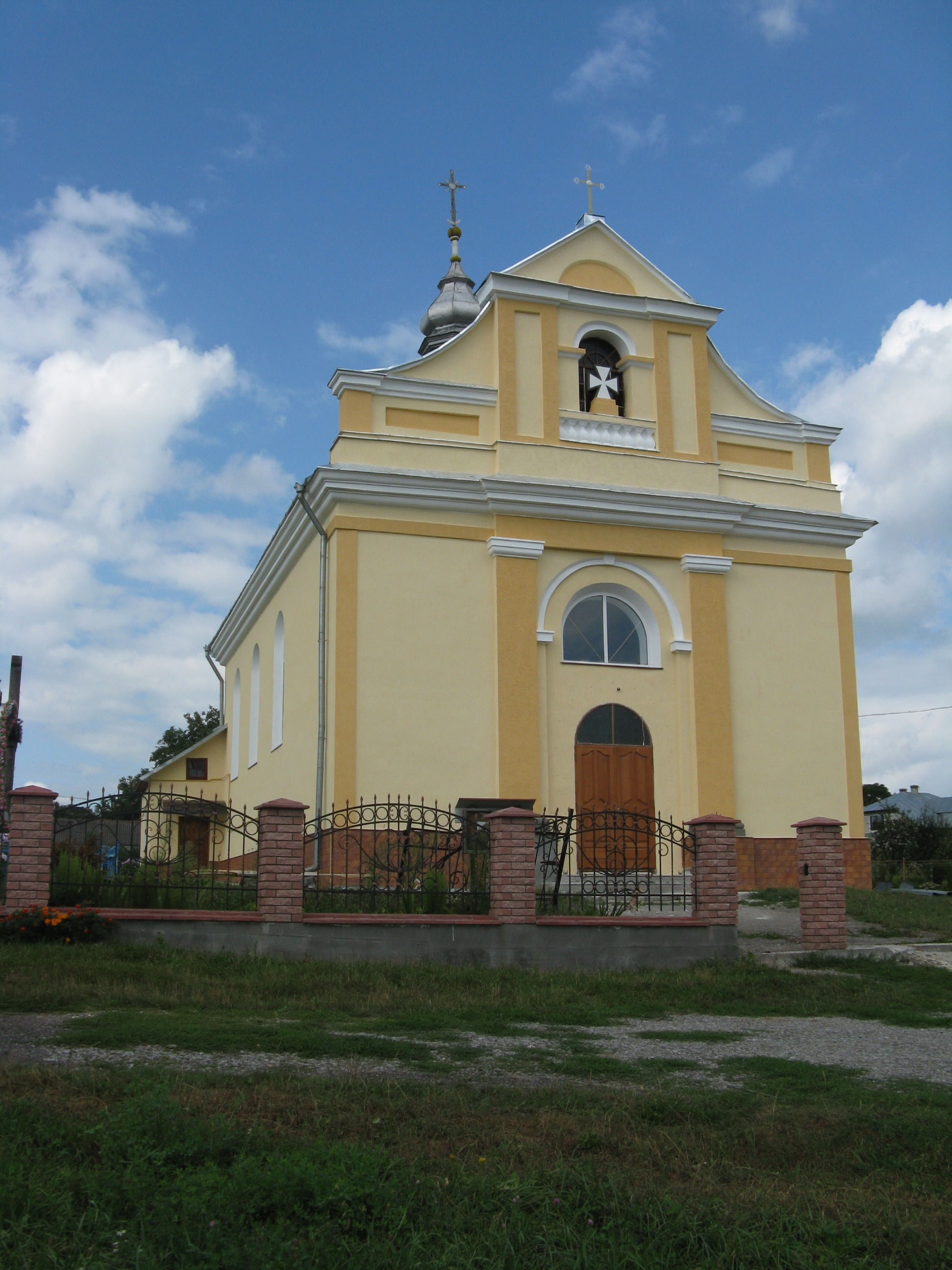
Church
