= Volytsia, Naraiv rural hromada, Ternopil Raion, Ternopil Oblast =

Rural locality in Ternopil Oblast, Ukraine

Volytsia Волиця
- Location in Ternopil Oblast
- Coordinates: 49°27′6″N 24°46′33″E
- Country: Ukraine
- Oblast: Ternopil Oblast
- Raion: Ternopil Raion
- Hromada: Naraiv rural hromada
- Time zone: UTC+2 (EET)
  - Summer (DST): UTC+3 (EEST)
- Postal code: 47520

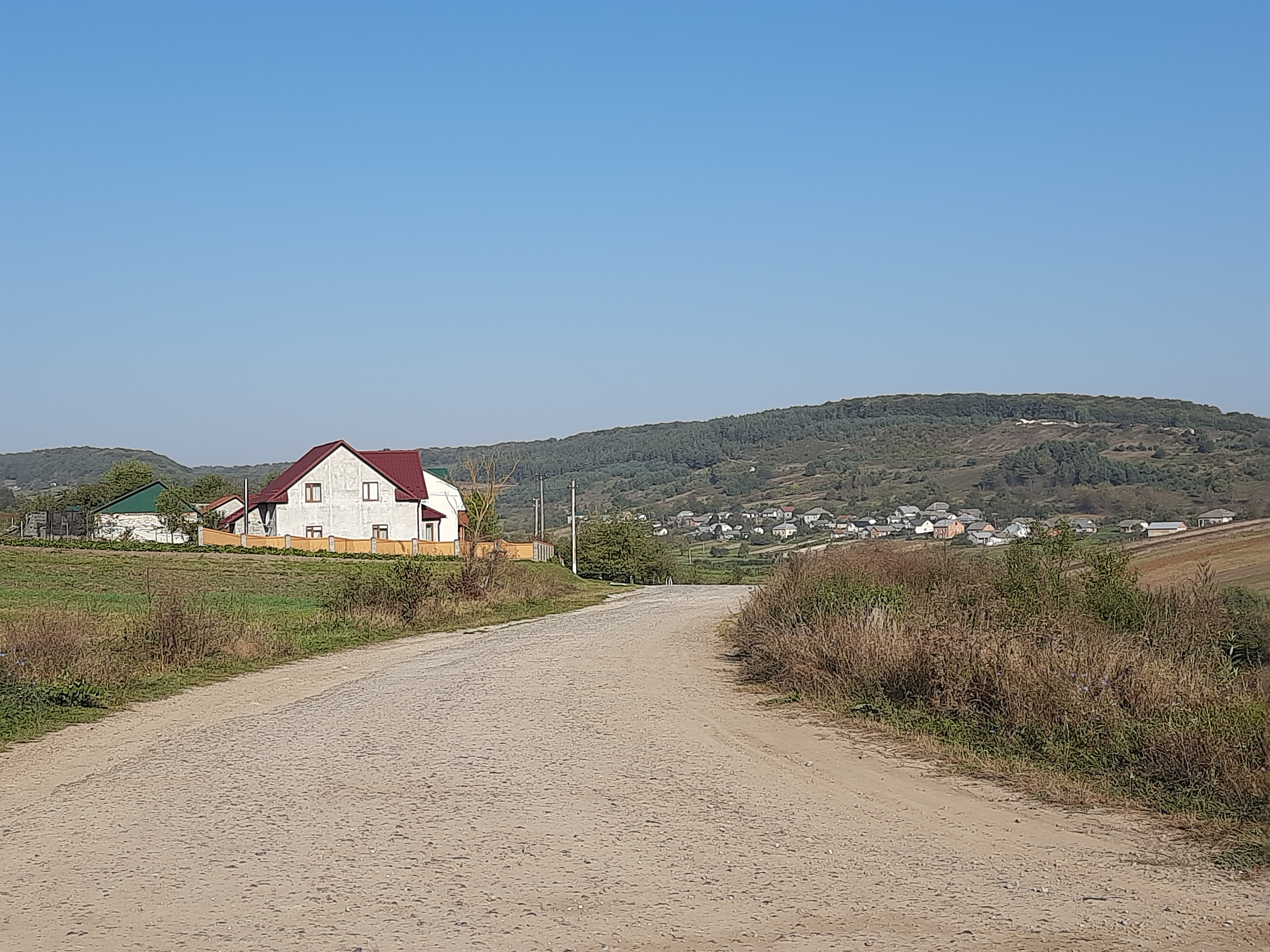
Entrance to the village of Volytsia, Naraiv rural community, Ternopil district, Ternopil region.

Volytsia (Ukrainian: Волиця) is a village in Naraiv rural hromada, Ternopil Raion, Ternopil Oblast, Ukraine.

== History ==
The first written mention of the village was in 1618.

After the liquidation of the Berezhany Raion on 19 July 2020, the village became part of the Ternopil Raion.

== Religion ==
- Church of the Immaculate Conception of the Blessed Virgin Mary (1908, UGCC).

== Sources ==
- (in Ukrainian) Ханас В., Волиця // Ternopil Encyclopedic Dictionary: in 4 v. / editorial board: H. Yavorskyi and other, Ternopil: "Zbruch", 2004, V. 1: А—Й, S. 297. — ISBN 966-528-197-6.
