= Jackie Kahane =

Canadian-American comedian (1921–2001)

Jackie Kahane (1921–2001) was a stand-up comedian, actor and writer.

Kahane was born on 29 September 1921 in Narajow, Poland, although often incorrectly cited as Montreal. His parents immigrated to Montreal several years later. He was most notable for working with Elvis Presley from 1972 until his death in 1977, during which time he was once booed off the stage in Madison Square Garden due to the crowds impatience to see Presley perform. He is also known for featuring in Elvis on Tour (1972), and appearing numerous times on The David Frost Show, The Tonight Show with Johnny Carson, and The Ed Sullivan Show. In 1961, Kahane was selected along with Bill Cosby as one of Time magazine's outstanding comedians.

He wrote and delivered the eulogy at Elvis' funeral, and died after a lengthy battle with cancer on 26 March 2001 in Encino, California.
