= Verbiv, Naraiv rural hromada, Ternopil Raion, Ternopil Oblast =

Rural locality in Ternopil Oblast, Ukraine

Verbiv Вербів
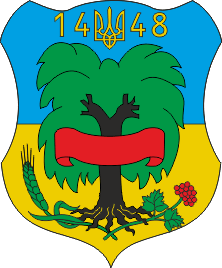
- Coat of arms
- Interactive map of Verbiv
- Coordinates: 49°31′27″N 24°51′25″E
- Country: Ukraine
- Oblast: Ternopil Oblast
- Raion: Ternopil Raion
- Time zone: UTC+2 (EET)
  - Summer (DST): UTC+3 (EEST)
- Postal code: 47514
- Area code: +380 3548

Verbiv (Ukrainian: Вербів, Polish: Wierzbów, Russian: назва) is a village in Ternopil Raion of Ternopil Oblast, Ukraine. It belongs to Naraiv rural hromada, one of the hromadas of Ukraine.

Until 18 July 2020, Verbiv belonged to Berezhany Raion. The raion was abolished in July 2020 as part of the administrative reform of Ukraine, which reduced the number of raions of Ternopil Oblast to three. The area of Berezhany Raion was merged into Ternopil Raion.

== Population ==
- Population in 2001: 856 inhabitants with over 302 houses.
- Population in 2014: 666.

== Sources ==
- (in Ukrainian) Я. Павлів, В. Часковський, І. Чернецький, Вербів // Ternopil Encyclopedic Dictionary: in 4 v. / editorial board: H. Yavorskyi and other, Ternopil: "Zbruch", 2004, V. 1: А—Й, S. 244-245. — ISBN 966-528-197-6.
