= Kuriany, Ukraine =

Rural locality in Ternopil Oblast, Ukraine

Coordinates: 49°25′28″N 24°48′21″E

Kuriany (Ukrainian: Куряни; Polish: Kurzany) is a village of 831 people in Ternopil Raion (district) of Ternopil Oblast (province) in western Ukraine. Kuriany is situated on both sides of the Narayivka River, in a valley surrounded by hills covered with thick forests on both sides. The main Ternopil-Stryi highway runs through town. Kuriany belongs to Naraiv rural hromada, one of the hromadas of Ukraine.

Until 18 July 2020, Kuriany belonged to Berezhany Raion. The raion was abolished in July 2020 as part of the administrative reform of Ukraine, which reduced the number of raions of Ternopil Oblast to three. The area of Berezhany Raion was merged into Ternopil Raion.

Its name comes from the word "kuryty" (= to smoke) or "kury" (hens). There are large deposits of sand near the village, providing some sand mining industry. The distance to Berezhany is 13 km eastward. The closest villages are Pavliv, Volytsya (Vulka) and Rohachyn to the east and Demnya and Pidvysoke to the west. The village has an old Greek-Catholic Church of St. Paraskeva, a supermarket, a Taras Shevchenko monument, and 11-year secondary school.

== Demographics ==
- Population in 1900: 1416 inhabitants (111 Jews)
- Population in 1939: 1880 inhabitants (30 Jews)
- Population in 2001: 831 inhabitants, including 204 houses.
