= Hutysko =

Rural locality in Ternopil Oblast, Ukraine

Hutysko Гутисько
- Location in Ternopil Oblast
- Coordinates: 49°23′47″N 24°49′54″E
- Country: Ukraine
- Oblast: Ternopil Oblast
- Raion: Ternopil Raion

Population (2003)
  - Total: 114
- Time zone: UTC+2 (EET)
  - Summer (DST): UTC+3 (EEST)
- Postal code: 47523
- Area code: +380 3548

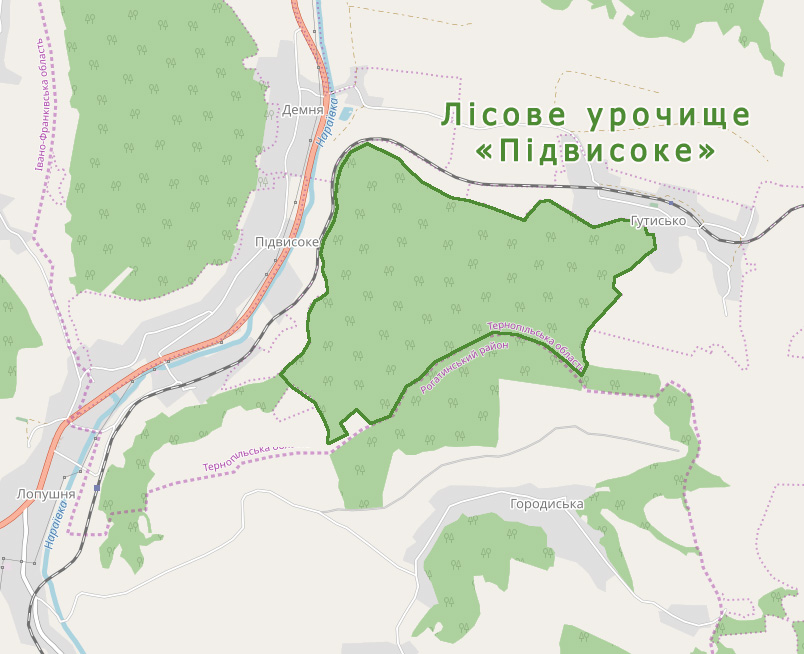
Hutysko on map

Hutysko (Ukrainian: Гутисько) is a village in Ternopil Raion of Ternopil Oblast, Ukraine. It belongs to Naraiv rural hromada, one of the hromadas of Ukraine.

Until 18 July 2020, Hutysko belonged to Berezhany Raion. The raion was abolished in July 2020 as part of the administrative reform of Ukraine, which reduced the number of raions of Ternopil Oblast to three. The area of Berezhany Raion was merged into Ternopil Raion.

== Population ==
- Population in 2003: 114 inhabitants with over 46 houses.

== Sources ==
- (in Ukrainian) Б. Волинський, С. Дух, Гутисько // Ternopil Encyclopedic Dictionary: in 4 v. / editorial board: H. Yavorskyi and other, Ternopil: "Zbruch", 2004, V. 1: А—Й, S. 441. — ISBN 966-528-197-6.
