= Congregation Shir Libeynu =

Liberal egalitarian Jewish congregation in Toronto, Canada

- Formation: 1997
- Founder: Aviva Goldberg, Dinah Rosen, Adrienne Rosenwhite, Myra Rosenwhite, Erica Goodman
- Type: Jewish congregation
- Headquarters: Toronto, Ontario, Canada
- Spiritual leader: Cantor Cheryl Wunch
- Website: shirlibeynu.ca

Congregation Shir Libeynu is a liberal, unaffiliated, egalitarian and intentionally LGBTQ+-inclusive Jewish congregation based in downtown Toronto, Ontario. The congregation is unaffiliated with any of the major Jewish religious movements and welcomes people from a range of Jewish backgrounds. Its spiritual leader is Cantor Cheryl Wunch.

== History ==
Congregation Shir Libeynu was founded in 1997 by Aviva Goldberg, Dinah Rosen, Adrienne Rosenwhite, Myra Rosenwhite and Erica Goodman. The founders sought to create a congregation welcoming to LGBTQ+ Jews and interfaith couples and families. The name Shir Libeynu means "song of our hearts".

The congregation held its first services in 1997. Approximately 75 people attended its first High Holy Day services, held at the University of Toronto's Ontario Institute for Studies in Education (OISE). It subsequently expanded to monthly services and services marking Jewish holidays including Yom Kippur, Hanukkah and Purim.

In 2007, Shir Libeynu began holding an annual Pride service in June and became the first Jewish congregation in Toronto to hold a Pride service. By 2012, approximately 300 people were attending its High Holy Day services.

Goldberg, who had served as the congregation's spiritual leader, was ordained as a rabbi in 2014. She retired as spiritual leader in 2019 and became rabbi emerita. Cantor Cheryl Wunch succeeded Goldberg as spiritual leader.

== Religious practice and community ==
Shir Libeynu describes itself as a liberal and egalitarian congregation and is not affiliated with a particular denomination of Judaism. Its membership includes people from Reform, Reconstructionist, Conservative, Orthodox and secular Jewish backgrounds. Services incorporate both Hebrew and English and combine traditional Jewish liturgy with contemporary prayers and music.

The congregation is intentionally inclusive of LGBTQ+ people and welcomes interfaith couples and families. Its approach to worship includes egalitarian and gender-inclusive liturgical language. In addition to religious services, the congregation holds educational, cultural and social programming.

== Locations ==
Shir Libeynu does not own a synagogue building and has met at several locations in downtown Toronto. Its first High Holy Day services were held at OISE at the University of Toronto. The congregation later held services at the Cecil Street Community Centre, which had formerly housed the Anshei Ostrovtzer Synagogue, and at the Miles Nadal Jewish Community Centre.

The congregation currently holds services at College Street United Church, near the Kensington Market neighbourhood.

== Cemetery ==
Shir Libeynu has a designated section at Beit Olam, a Jewish cemetery within Glenview Memorial Gardens in Woodbridge, Ontario. The section allows Jewish members and their non-Jewish spouses or partners to be buried together.

== See also ==
- LGBTQ-affirming religious groups
- LGBTQ-affirming denominations in Judaism
- Beach Hebrew Institute
- Danforth Jewish Circle
- First Narayever Congregation
