= Beach Hebrew Institute =

Synagogue in Toronto, Canada

- Location in Toronto

Religion
- Affiliation: Conservative Judaism
- Rite: Nusach Ashkenaz (unaffiliated, egalitarian)
- Ecclesiastical or organisational status: Synagogue
- Leadership: Moshe Saadon (Cantor)
- Status: Active

Location
- Location: 109 Kenilworth Avenue, Toronto, Ontario,
- Country: Canada
- Coordinates: 43°40′10″N 79°18′06″W

Architecture
- Type: Church
- Style: Vernacular
- Established: 1919 (as a congregation)
- Completed: 1895 (as a church); 1926 (as a synagogue)

Specifications
- Direction of façade: East
- Materials: Brick

Website
- beachhebrewinstitute.ca

The Beach Hebrew Institute, also known as Beth Jacob Congregation (transliterated from Hebrew as "Beit Knesset Beit Ya'akov"), is an unaffiliated, egalitarian Conservative Jewish congregation and synagogue, located in The Beaches neighbourhood of Toronto, Ontario, in Canada. Founded in 1919 as an Orthodox Jewish congregation, the members purchased their current building—a former church—in 1920, and renovated it in 1926.

Following World War II the congregation declined. The members considered selling the building in the 1970s, but a campaign to save it led to its receiving much needed repairs, and the 1982 designation of the building as a site of historical importance by the City of Toronto. An influx of younger, more liberal families, led to the congregation becoming an unaffiliated egalitarian Conservative congregation.

== Early history ==
The Beach Hebrew Institute was founded in 1919 by Jewish residents in The Beaches neighbourhood of Toronto, Ontario, Canada, which was then a largely Anglo-Saxon area in the east part of Toronto far removed from the Jewish neighbourhoods further to the west in The Ward and around Spadina Avenue. The forty or so Jewish families living in The Beaches at the time tended to be more prosperous and had either been born in Canada or immigrated at an early age and so spoke English as their first language, compared to the Yiddish speaking, impoverished, recent immigrants who predominated in the city's main Jewish neighbourhoods. Many of them either owned local shops in the area or summer homes.

$1,500 (today $20,000) was raised towards the purchase or construction of a synagogue building and, in 1920, the old Kenilworth Avenue Baptist Church, originally built in 1895, at 109 Kenilworth Avenue (at Queen Street) was acquired with a $4,500 (today $60,000) mortgage. In 1926, the synagogue was renovated; a new facade was added, electrical features were installed, an upstairs gallery was installed to serve as a school, and a new basement layout provided more space. The red brick front facade was built to make the building look less like a church and more like a synagogue. It features a round top, a large Star of David, and five stained glass windows.

The Beach Hebrew Institute was located in not only a largely Anglo-Saxon area, but also one that in the 1930s exhibited antisemitism with the creation of "Swastika Clubs" that organized anti-Jewish marches, and signs on the Boardwalk reading "No Dogs or Jews Allowed". It therefore tried to maintain a low, inconspicuous profile, and its unconventional name, which avoided using the word "synagogue", was "due to the lack of Jews in the area, as well as the anti-Semitic atmosphere at some points."

== Post World War II ==
The synagogue remained popular until after World War II when many of the congregants followed much of the rest of Toronto's Jewish community as it migrated north up Bathurst Street to Forest Hill and further north. The decline in membership forced the synagogue to cancel its Hebrew and Sunday schools and disband the Beach Sisterhood. However, there was a brief revival caused by a new wave of Jewish families in the 1950s, followed by two decades of further decline. By the 1970s, older members considered selling the building until an influx of young more liberal Jewish families moving into the neighbourhood, some of whom were intermarried couples or recent converts, led to the synagogue's revitalization. A major campaign to raise money to restore the synagogue was conducted including charity auctions, bazaars and the involvement of high-profile politicians such as the mayor and Members of Parliament. Media interest followed as well as the 1982 designation of the building as a site of historical importance by the City of Toronto. The congregation's fundraising goal was met resulting in needed repairs to the walls, plumbing and furnace as well as the renovation of the basement to enable it to operate as a function hall.

Originally Orthodox, the congregation is now unaffiliated and egalitarian, and describes itself as "liberal Conservative" or "Conservative egalitarian". Services are conducted in Hebrew with occasional prayers in English. Women play an active role in services, are welcome to read from the Torah and may receive an aliyah. As of 2011, the synagogue had no rabbi; the president was Rosalee Monk, but as of June 2014, Gary Bercovitch and the cantor is Moshe Saadon.

From the 1960s until his death in 2011, sabbath services were led by Sam Tanenbaum, an Auschwitz survivor who worked as an upholsterer after coming to Canada. While he was an ordained rabbi he never used the title.

== See also ==
- Danforth Jewish Circle
- Congregation Shir Libeynu
- First Narayever Congregation
