= Shaarei Tzedec =

Jewish synagogue in Toronto, Canada

Coordinates: 43.65947°N 79.4099°W

Shaarei Tzedec Congregation

Religion
- Affiliation: Orthodox Judaism
- Rite: Nusach Sefard
- Leadership: Rabbi Yosef Yitzchak Holtzberg
- Status: Active

Location
- Location: 397 Markham Street; Toronto, Ontario, Canada; M6G 2K8
- Interactive map of Shaarei Tzedec Congregation

Architecture
- Type: Victorian
- Style: Bay-and-gable semi-detached house

Specifications
- Capacity: 150
- Materials: brick

Website
- shaareitzedec.org

Shaarei Tzedec Congregation (also known as the Markham Street Shul) is an Orthodox Jewish synagogue located at 397 Markham Street in Toronto, Ontario, Canada.

The Shaarei Tzedec congregation was founded in 1902 and is the westernmost of the three Orthodox synagogues left in Downtown Toronto. In 1912, a number of families left Shaarei Tzedec, then on Centre Street, in a dispute over burial rites, and formed a new congregation, Chevra Rodfei Sholem, commonly known as the Kiever Shul.

Shaarei Tzedec has been located in a converted Victorian semi-detached house on Markham Street, near Bathurst Street and College Street, since 1937. The Markham Street Shul is one of the few remaining synagogues and the last remaining Orthodox shtiebel of what were once dozens of small congregations in the area around Kensington Market, Spadina Avenue and Bathurst Street - which was a vibrant Jewish area prior to World War II. Shaarei Tzedek, Anshei Minsk, and the Kiever Synagogue are the only historic Orthodox congregations remaining of at least 40 that existed in downtown Toronto in the early 1930s. First Narayever Congregation on Brunswick Street, a liberal egalitarian synagogue, is the only other remaining shtiebel in the area.
