= Danforth Jewish Circle =

Jewish congregation in Toronto

The Danforth Jewish Circle is an unaffiliated, egalitarian, liberal, progressive Jewish congregation in Toronto. It meets at the East End United Church on Danforth Avenue in Greektown neighbourhood in Old Toronto's east end. The congregation originated in 1996 when some attendees of Simcha Jacobovici's more traditional, Orthodox, Riverdale Shul sought a more progressive egalitarian space that was also welcoming of interfaith relationships and organized to found a congregation. Its first major event were High Holiday celebrations held above a Greek restaurant. Though it initially drew rabbis from the Reform movement to conduct services, the new congregation opted to remain unaffiliated. Rabbi Miriam Margles, a graduate of the Reconstructionist Rabbinical College, became the congregation's first permanent rabbi in 2010. As of 2022, the congregation was holding regular High Holiday and Shabbat services, meeting twice a month on Fridays, with Shabbat morning services five or six times a year. Since 2022, the congregation has been led by Rabbi Ilyse Glickman.

Danforth Jewish Circle has plots reserved in Beit Olam Cemetery (the Jewish section of Glenview Memorial Gardens), which allows interfaith couples and families to be buried alongside each other, burial of individuals who are members of the DJC but are not halachically Jewish, as well as burial of cremated remains.

== See also ==
- Beach Hebrew Institute
- Congregation Shir Libeynu
- First Narayever Congregation
