= Kiever Synagogue =

Orthodox synagogue in Toronto, Canada

The First Russian Congregation of Rodfei Sholem Anshei Kiev
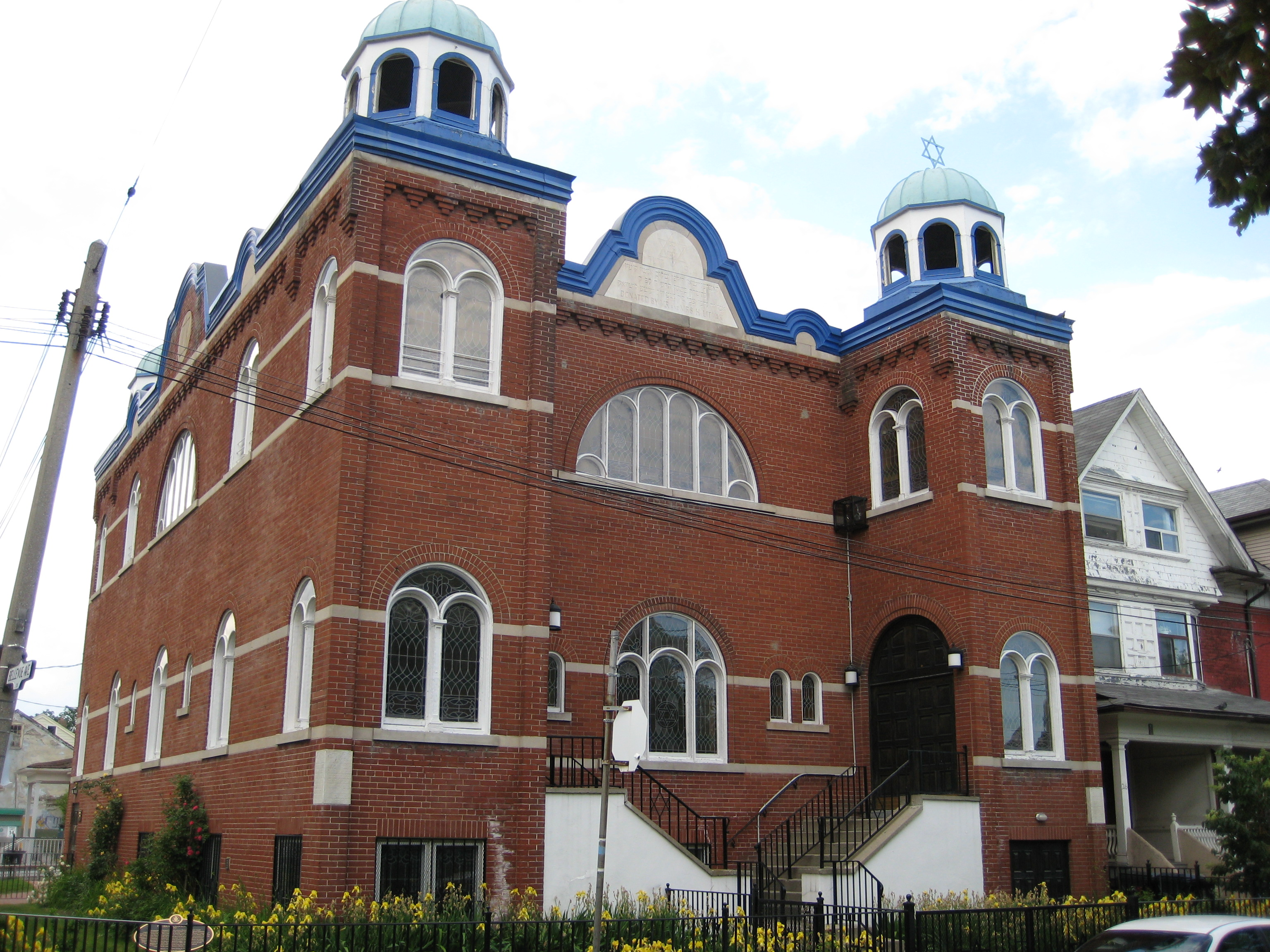
- Kiever Synagogue

Religion
- Affiliation: Modern Orthodox Judaism
- Rite: Nusach Sefard
- Leadership: Adam S. Cohen (President)
- Status: Active

Location
- Location: 25 Bellevue Avenue / 28 Denison Square, Toronto, Ontario, Canada
- Interactive map of The First Russian Congregation of Rodfei Sholem Anshei Kiev
- Coordinates: 43.653837°N 79.402960°W

Architecture
- Architect: Benjamin Swartz
- Style: Byzantine Revival
- Completed: 1927

Specifications
- Direction of façade: South
- Capacity: 400
- Dome: 2
- Materials: Red brick

Website
- kievershul.com

The First Russian Congregation of Rodfei Sholem Anshei Kiev, known as the Kiever Synagogue or Kiever Shul, is a Modern Orthodox Jewish synagogue in Toronto, Ontario, Canada. It was founded by Jewish immigrants from Ukraine in 1912, and formally incorporated in 1914. The congregants were poor working-class people, and services were led by members and held in their homes. Two houses were eventually purchased in the Kensington Market area, and in their place construction was completed on the current twin-domed Byzantine Revival building in 1927. The building was once the site of George Taylor Denison's home Bellevue.

Changing demographics led to a decline in membership in the 1950s and 1960s, and the synagogue building deteriorated. In 1973, the Canadian Jewish Congress decided to help preserve it, and in 1979, the Kiever Synagogue became the first building of Jewish significance to be designated a historical site by the province of Ontario. By 1982 sufficient funds had been raised to restore the building.

The congregation's first and longest-tenured rabbi was Solomon Langner, who served from around 1929 until his death in 1973. As of 2018, the synagogue president was Adam S. Cohen.

== Early history ==
The Kiever Synagogue dates to 1912 when a group of Jewish immigrants from Ukraine who had settled in "The Ward"—the impoverished immigrant district of Toronto, Ontario, Canada in which most Jews then lived—decided to found a synagogue. It was founded as a landsmanshaft by Jewish immigrants originally from the Kiev Governorate of the Russian Empire (now Ukraine). Some of the families had been members of Shaarei Tzedek, then on Centre Street, but had left in a dispute over burial rites and formed a new congregation, Chevra Rodfei Sholem.

The men, tradesmen for the most part, had little money so they conducted services in the homes of members, and later rented a house on Centre Street to hold services. Not being able to afford a rabbi, services in the shtiebel were led by members, including Cantor Herschel Litvak. The congregation was officially incorporated in 1914 as "The First Russian Congregation of Rodfei Sholem Anshei Kiev".

== Synagogue building ==
As the congregation grew to 50 members, it raised sufficient funds, in 1917, to purchase a house, with a $6,000 mortgage, at 25 Bellevue Avenue. The new location was on the outskirts of Kensington Market, which was becoming a bustling Jewish neighbourhood as immigrants gradually lifted themselves out of the abject poverty of the Ward and moved west.

In 1921, a second house was purchased and by 1923, the congregation grew prosperous enough to build a new synagogue on the site of the two houses. The location, at the corner of Denison Square and Bellevue, was originally the site of Belle Vue, the house built in 1815 by the area's first British settler Captain George Taylor Denison, and demolished around 1890. The new building, with a capacity for 400 people, was designed by Benjamin Swartz, and financed by a $16,000 (today $290,000) mortgage. Construction took place between 1924 and 1927, during which services were held in members' homes.

Designed in the Byzantine Revival style, the building's exterior featured twin domed red-brick towers crowned with Stars of David, and two opposing main staircases leading up to separate main entrances on the south side. The sanctuary, however, faced the east in accordance with the tradition that Jews face Jerusalem while praying. The pews surrounded a central bimah from which services were led. In accordance with Orthodox tradition, men sat on the main floor, while women sat above in the gallery. The sanctuary's interior was illuminated by geometric stained-glass windows, featured brass ornamentation and was dominated by a huge hand-carved Torah ark, acquired in 1931. In 1934–35 paintings of biblical animals and signs of the zodiac were added to the gallery, and murals of Jerusalem and Rachel's Tomb painted on the walls of the social hall, which was in the basement. The building and sanctuary remain largely unchanged today.

== Decline and revival ==
Solomon Langner became the congregation's rabbi in around 1929 and held that position until his death in 1973. He did not, however, receive a salary, and instead "supported himself and his family from donations and compensation that he received for specific services he performed, such as bris milot, marriages, and funerals".

By the time of Langner's death, the Kiever was in desperate need of repairs. However, due to the Jewish community's migration away from Kensington Market and north up Bathurst Street in the 1950s and 1960s, the congregation was declining and experiencing financial difficulties. Unable to afford repairs, it considered selling the building. In 1973, the Archives Committee of the Canadian Jewish Congress Central Region decided to help preserve the Kiever stating that "the community should have the building not only for its inherent historical value, but also because it would provide a physical environment where youth could identify their roots, to see their parents’ milieu and what motivated previous generations." A restoration committee was established that secured grants and held fundraising events. By 1982, enough money was raised to restore the building and renovate the social hall.

In 1979, the Kiever Synagogue became the first building of Jewish significance to be designated a historical site by the province of Ontario. The designation states that the Kiever is historically unique because of its distinctive architectural features and because "it was the first synagogue built by Ukrainian Jews who had escaped from Czarist Russia." The building is protected under Part IV of the Ontario Heritage Act since May 14, 1979. It also is subject to a heritage easement agreement with the City since November 17, 1981.

Sheldon Steinberg served as rabbi from the time of Langner's death until the mid-1990s. More recently, Gedalia Zweig served as part-time rabbi for almost ten years.

As of 2011, the congregation's president was David Pinkus, a role he has filled since 1979. His father, Isadore, was one of the synagogue's founders. The Kiever Synagogue, Anshei Minsk (also in Kensington Market), and Shaarei Tzedec are the only historic Orthodox congregations remaining of at least 40 that existed in downtown Toronto in the early 1930s.

In 2019 prominent fiddlers played within the synagogue to help raise $100,000 for roofing repairs.
