= Church of the Presentation of Virgin Mary, Vovkiv =

Church in Lviv Oblast, Ukraine

Church of the Presentation of Virgin Mary Церква Введення в храм Пресвятої Богородиці
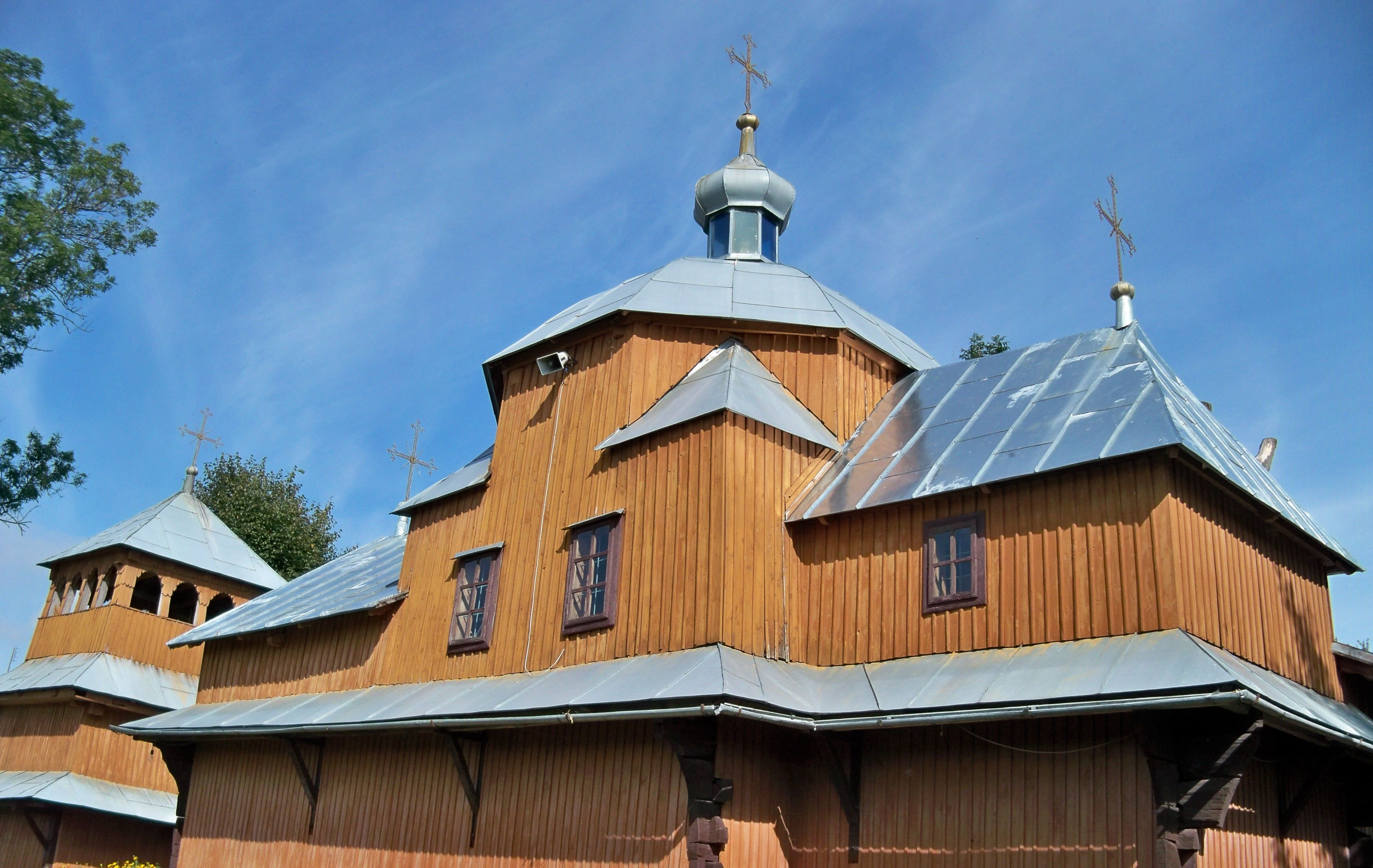

- Location within Lviv Oblast

Religion
- Affiliation: Ukrainian Greek Catholic Church
- Ecclesiastical or organisational status: Architectural monument of local importance

Location
- Location: Vovkiv, Solonka rural hromada, Lviv Raion, Lviv Oblast, Ukraine
- Coordinates: 49°42′44″N 24°04′22″E

Architecture
- Completed: 1702

Church of the Presentation of Virgin Mary (Ukrainian: Церква Введення в храм Пресвятої Богородиці) is a Greek Catholic parish wooden church (UGCC) in Vovkiv of the Solonka rural hromada, Lviv Raion, Lviv Oblast. Architectural monument of local importance.

== History ==
The wooden church was built in 1702 (by Yakiv Ostapets).

As of 1741, the church and bell tower were covered with wood shingles. From 1723, an antimension from Bishop Athanasius Sheptytskyi was kept.

In 1847–1848, the roofs of the church and bell tower were repaired. In 1904, the sanctuary of the church was painted by priest Vasyl Zatserkovnyi. During the World War I, the church was destroyed. In 1940, the sanctuary was covered with tin.

In 1962, the church was unregistered. Services resumed only in 1989. That year, Mykola Batih and his son painted the church (except for the sanctuary).

In 2019, thanks to the efforts of priest Petro Terletskyi and the Greek Catholic community, the church and bell tower were restored and covered with shingles again.

== Priests ==
- Dmytro Lozynskyi
- Teodor Horoshkevych
- Ivan Vishnovskyi (1765)
- Dmytro Kysilevskyi (1832–1835)
- Mykhailo Herovskyi (1835–1838)
- Mykola Ustyianovych (1838–1841, administrator)
- Yosyf Lototskyi (1841–1845)
- Ivan Yarymovych (1845–1846, administrator)
- Ivan Levytskyi (1846–1847, administrator)
- Evstakhii Merynovych (1847–1848)
- Efrem Hlynskyi (1848–1857)
- Vasyl Tselevych (1857–1866)
- Oleksander Horynovych (1866–1867, administrator; 1867–1891)
- Kornylii Malyshevskyi (1892, administrator)
- Leonid Molchkovskyi (1892–1893, administrator)
- Mykhailo Svitenkyi (1893–1897)
- Petro Petrytsia (1897, administrator)
- Teodozii Kynasevych (1897–1904)
- Vasyl Zatserkovnyi (1904–1905, administrator)
- Oleksandr Miiskyi (1905–1936)
- Mykhailo Volynets (1937–1944)
- Petro Terletskyi – now.

== Bibliography ==
- Громик В. Дерев'яні церкви Львівської області. — Львів, 2014. — С. 189.
