= Dobriany Monastery =

The Dobriany Ascension Monastery or Derevach Monastery (Ukrainian: Добрянський монастир Вознесіння Господнього, Деревацький монастир) was a defunct Basilian monastery of the Ukrainian Greek Catholic Church. It was located near the village of Khorosno (currently Lviv Raion, Lviv Oblast).

== Origin and Localization ==
For a long time, it was believed that the monastery was founded in 1582 (documentary confirmation of this date is absent). According to legend, the founder was Hieromonk Hryhorii Panashovskyi from Dobriany. Modern archaeological research introduces significant clarification to the understanding of the monastery's origin. Specifically, in 2019, a grotto monument with inner-rock grottos and traces of processing was discovered between the villages of Khorosno and Derevach, suggesting a much older, likely Kyivan Rus' origin of the Derevach Monastery.

Official administrative confirmation of the localization is contained in the Josephine Cadastre (Metric) of 1788, where the Dobriany Monastery with its lands was already attached not to Dobriany, but to the village of Khorosno Stare, near which it was directly located. The microtoponym Bazar is still preserved today, denoting the place where fairs took place, which arose based on the former monastic indulgences (pilgrimages).

== History ==
The history of the monastery from the 17th century is well documented. The original wooden complex burned down during a Tatar raid in 1612. A new stone church was erected on the new site, built in 1630. The monastery flourished in the late 17th — early 18th centuries, supported by Polish magnates. King John III Sobieski confirmed all previous privileges in 1680. These same privileges were reaffirmed by King Augustus II the Strong in 1700, and again in 1729.

Significant construction took place under Hegumen Father Hedeon Tymoshevych (from 1706), when a new main church was erected, completed in 1718, and a bell tower in 1725. In 1739, during the indulgence (pilgrimage) on the feast day of Saint Onuphrius, the Voivode of Smolensk wife, the illustrious lady Teresa Potocka, died in the chapel. In 1754, the monastery possessed substantial funds, and its annual income was approximately 500 florins.

The ledger of revenues indicates that the monastery's indulgences (pilgrimages) were established: in 1706 — on the feasts of the Ascension of the Lord and the Beheading of St. John the Baptist; from 1710 — on the feast of the Annunciation of the Blessed Virgin Mary; and from 1719 — on St. Onuphrius' Day. On these pilgrimage days, fairs—or markets (bazars)—took place on the monastery grounds, attracting merchants from Lviv, Shchyrets, and other towns. In the Humenetskyi skit (hermitage), the indulgences from 1711 were on St. Alexius Day, and from 1719 — on the Nativity of St. John the Baptist.

As part of the Basilian Order reforms in 1744, several smaller cloisters were annexed to the Dobriany Monastery.

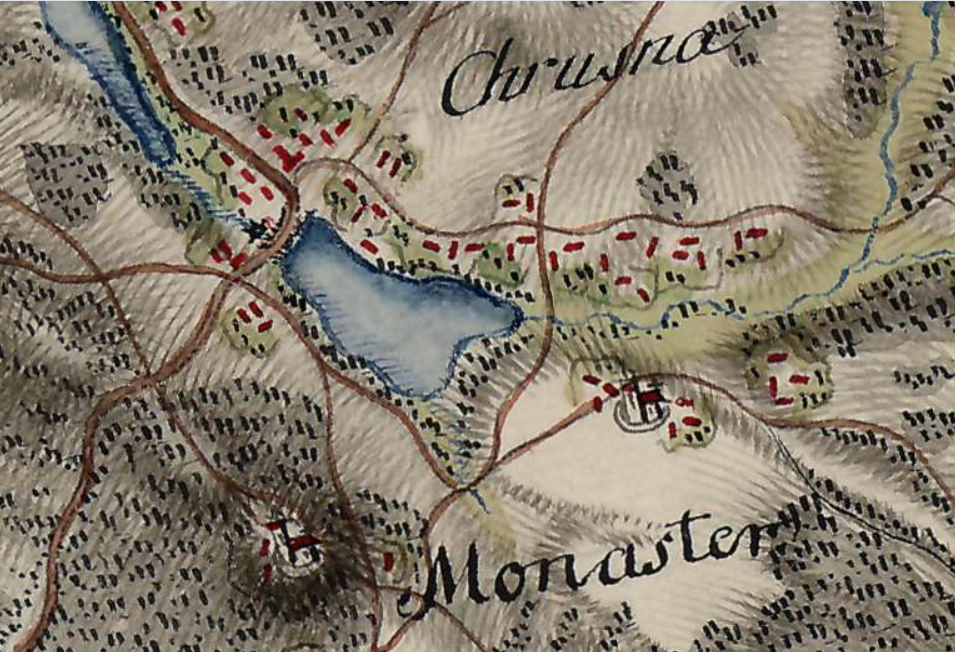
Dobriany Monastery near the village of Khorosno on Friedrich von Mieg's topographic map, late 18th century

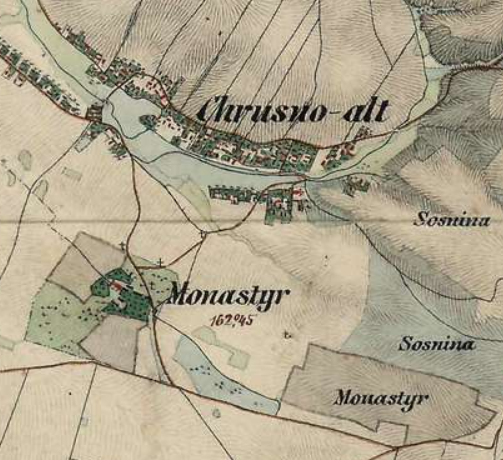
Dobriany Monastery near the village of Khorosno on an Austrian topographic map, 1861–1864

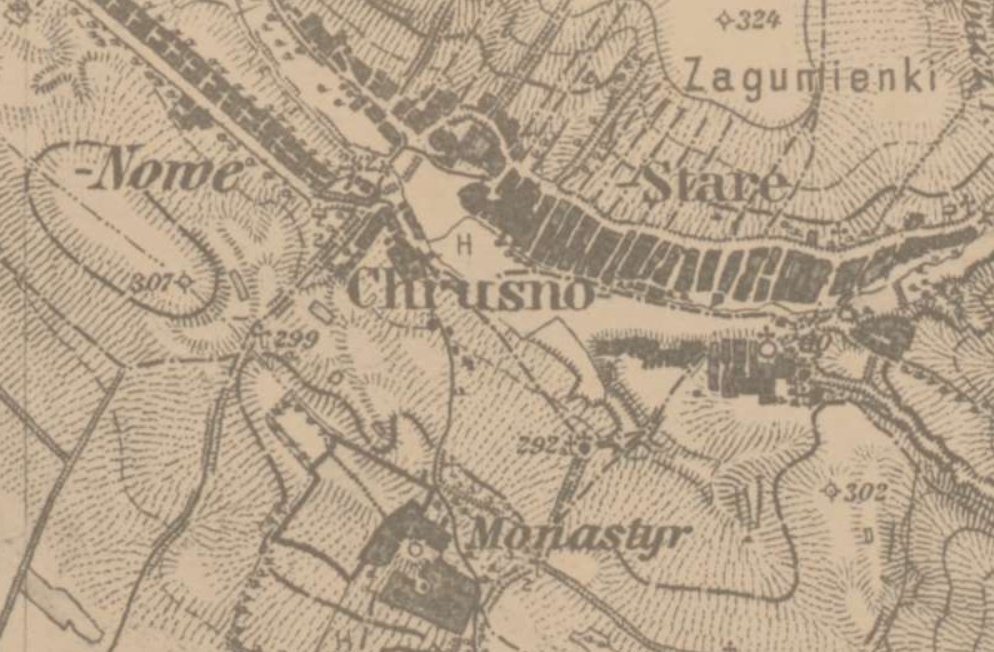
Dobriany Monastery near the village of Khorosno Stare on an Austrian topographic map, 1869–1887

== Architecture ==
The wooden Church of the Annunciation of the Blessed Virgin Mary, built in 1718, was an example of traditional Ukrainian wooden architecture. It was a three-part, three-domed structure: a narrower, polygonal altar adjoined the wider, square nave from the east, and an equally wide, rectangular narthex from the west. An architectural feature was its two-story design: the second tier of the narthex, surrounded by a gallery, housed the additional Church of the Beheading of St. John the Baptist. The structure was covered with shingles (honty), and its high, light-filled octagonal drums were crowned with helmet-shaped domes with cupolas.

The church, saved from sale in 1819, was ultimately dismantled by Russian soldiers in 1915 for the construction of trenches. In 1908, the architect Oleksandr Lushpynskyi sketched the church, which was later redrawn by Antin Varyvoda in 1930.

== Iconostasis ==
The most significant art monument of the monastery was its Baroque iconostasis, crafted in 1716. The carver (snitsar) was Ihnatii Stobenskyi, and the icons were painted by Hieromonk Teodosii Sichynskyi and the lay painter Pavlo Kylymovych. The iconostasis, which contained 50 images, was recognized as one of the best in Galicia after the iconostasis of the Manyava Skete.

In 1912, the iconostasis from the former church of the Dobriany Monastery was purchased by the Krasnopushcha Monastery from the landowner Hryhorii Chychkevych for 1500 crowns. In 1952, the iconostasis was sold to the church in the village of Verbiv, Ternopil Raion, where it has been preserved to this day.

== Decline and liquidation ==
The decline of the cloister began in the late 18th century as a result of the Josephine Reforms. In 1776, it lost its independence and was annexed to the St. George's Monastery in Lviv as a folwark.

On the monastery grounds, where religious indulgences were previously held, these events were still recorded as indulgences in 1784 (on the Annunciation, Ascension, St. Onuphrius, Beheading of St. John the Baptist, and St. John the Evangelist), but by 1788, these feasts were officially designated as fairs, which evidences the complete secularization of these events.

The liquidation as a structure began with an auction (litsytatsiia) scheduled for 6 September 1819. Thanks to the intervention of Modest Hrynevetskyi, who paid 600 florins, the monastic church was saved from being sold to colonists and stood for almost another 100 years.

Already by the mid-19th century, the farmstead passed into the hands of private tenants, notably Antoni Michniewicz (in 1877). The final liquidation occurred with the sale of the land assets to a private individual — Hryhoriy Chychkevych in 1896, after which the monastic church and its historical artifacts were left without proper care.

During the Soviet era, a small poultry farm was located on the site of the monastery. Today, only the remnants of the old monastic garden remain on the site, and the area itself is overgrown.

== Hegumens ==
- Hieromonk Hryhorii Panashovskyi (17th century),
- Hegumen Hedeon Tymoshevych (from 1706),
- Hegumen Atanasii (after 1706 – until 1745),
- Hegumen Vasyl Sliuzykevych (from early 1745 – until 1747),
- Hegumen Dositei Romanovych (1747–1757),
- Vicar Samuil Podlevskyi (September 1757 – March 1758),
- Hegumen Yosyf Lozynskyi (March 1758 – August 1760),
- Hegumen Viktor Makulinskyi (August 1760 – 1765),
- Hegumen Sofronii Ilnytskyi (from 1765),
- Hegumen Yosyf Komarnytskyi (from 1767),
- Hegumen Dionizii Bozovskyi (from 1768),
- Hegumen Yosafat Lozynskyi (April – August 1772),
- Hegumen Apolonii Okunskyi (from August 23, 1772 – until 1776),
- Procurator Yason Kushchynskyi (1778–1782), who performed administrative functions after the monastery lost its independence.
