= Ruslan Zabranskyi =

Ukrainian football coach and player

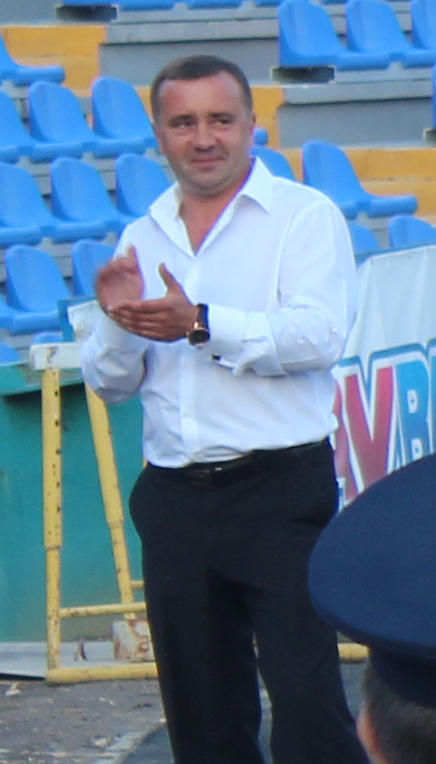

Personal information
- Full name: Ruslan Mykhailovych Zabranskyi
- Date of birth: 10 March 1971 (age 55)
- Place of birth: Vovkiv, Pustomyty Raion, Ukrainian SSR
- Height: 1.74 m (5 ft 9 in)
- Position: Forward

Youth career
- 1981–1985: Karpaty
- 1985–1989: Lviv sports boarding school

Senior career*
Years	Team	Apps	(Gls)
1989–1992	Karpaty Lviv		
1992–1998	Evis Mykolaiv/SC Mykolaiv		
1998–1999	Kryvbas Kryvyi Rih		
1998–1999	→ Kryvbas-2 Kryvyi Rih (loan)		
1999–2000	Prykarpattia Ivano-Frankivsk		
1999–2000	→ Prykarpattia-2 Ivano-Frankivsk (loan)		
2000–2001	Vinnytsia		
2001–2002	Tavriya Simferopol		
2002	Vodnyk Mykolaiv		
2002–2003	Mykolaiv		
2002–2003	→ Olimpia FC AES (loan)		
2003–2004	Olimpia FC AES		
2004	Metalurh Mykolaiv		

Managerial career
- 2004–2005: Metalurh Mykolaiv
- 2005–2010: FC Voronivka
- 2008–2013: Mykolaiv sports school (director)
- 2010–2013: Mykolaiv
- 2014–2015: Mykolaiv (sports director)
- 2014–2018: Mykolaiv academy (director)
- 2015–2018: Mykolaiv
- * Club domestic league appearances and goals

Ruslan Zabranskyi (Ukrainian: Русла́н Миха́йлович Забра́нський; born 10 March 1971) is a Ukrainian professional football coach and a former player.

== Career ==
Zabranskyi after retiring as footballer became a manager in some amateur clubs in Mykolaiv. The main highlight of his managing career in the beginning was a champion's title of FC Voronivka in the 2007 Mykolaiv Oblast Championship. Since 2008 he works in MFC Mykolaiv for which he played.
