= Rakovets, Lviv Oblast =

Rural locality in Lviv Oblast, Ukraine

Rakovets Раковець
- Village
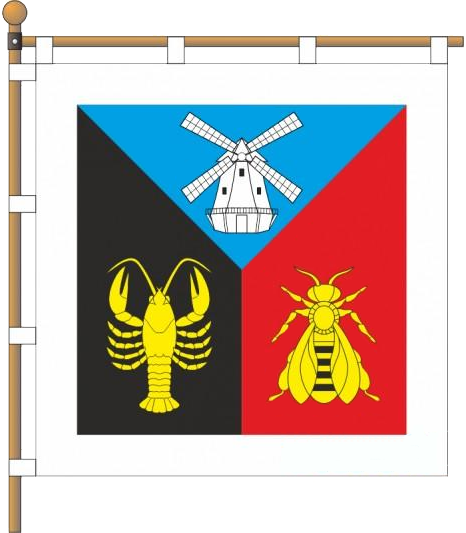
- Flag

- Location within Lviv Oblast
- Coordinates: 49°39′11″N 24°01′20″E
- Country: Ukraine
- Oblast: Lviv Oblast
- District: Lviv Raion
- Established: 1484

Area
  - Total: 128 km^{2} (49 sq mi)
- Elevation /(average value of): 296 m (971 ft)

Population
  - Total: 207
  - Density: 1.62/km^{2} (4.19/sq mi)
- Time zone: UTC+2 (EET)
  - Summer (DST): UTC+3 (EEST)
- Postal code: 81164
- Area code: +380 3230
- Website: село Раковець, райцентр Пустомити, облцентр Львів ^{(Ukrainian)}

Rakovets (Ukrainian: Ра́ковець, in the past had the name Mlynivtsi (Ukrainian: Млинівці)) – is a small village (selo), which is located in Lviv Raion, Lviv Oblast, of Western Ukraine. It belongs to Solonka rural hromada, one of the hromadas of Ukraine. The village covers an area of 1,28 km^{2}, and the population of the village is just about 207 persons. Local government is administered by Rakovetska village council.

== Geography ==
The village is located at an altitude of 290 metres (950 ft) above sea level, on the right bank of the Zubra River, a left tributary of the Dniester River (Dniester river basin). It is at a distance 1.5 kilometres (0.93 mi) on the east of the Highway M06 (Ukraine) ( M 06) at a distance 23 kilometres (14 mi) from the regional center of Lviv, 29 kilometres (18 mi) from the district center Pustomyty and 248 kilometres (154 mi) from the city of Uzhhorod.

== History ==
Rakovets village was mentioned for the first time in 1484. Its name comes from the crayfish (Rak richkovyy). Originally the village was a town. Then, unable to compete with neighboring Lviv, over the years the city has become a village.

Until 18 July 2020, Rakovets belonged to Pustomyty Raion. The raion was abolished in July 2020 as part of the administrative reform of Ukraine, which reduced the number of raions of Lviv Oblast to seven. The area of Pustomyty Raion was merged into Lviv Raion.

== Cult constructions and attractions ==
The village has an architectural monument of national importance, the Roman Catholic Church of St. Valentine, which currently is inactive. This Catholic church was built in 1856. In 1890 it was severely damaged, but was later restored.

An architectural monument of local importance in the village is the Church of the Holy Virgin Protection, built in 1904 by the famous Ukrainian architect Vasyl Nahirnyy and the bell tower of the church of the Holy Virgin Protection (wooden). The church belongs to the Diocese of UGCC.

The spring, located at the eastern edge of Rakovets, features a number of natural monuments.

== Gallery ==
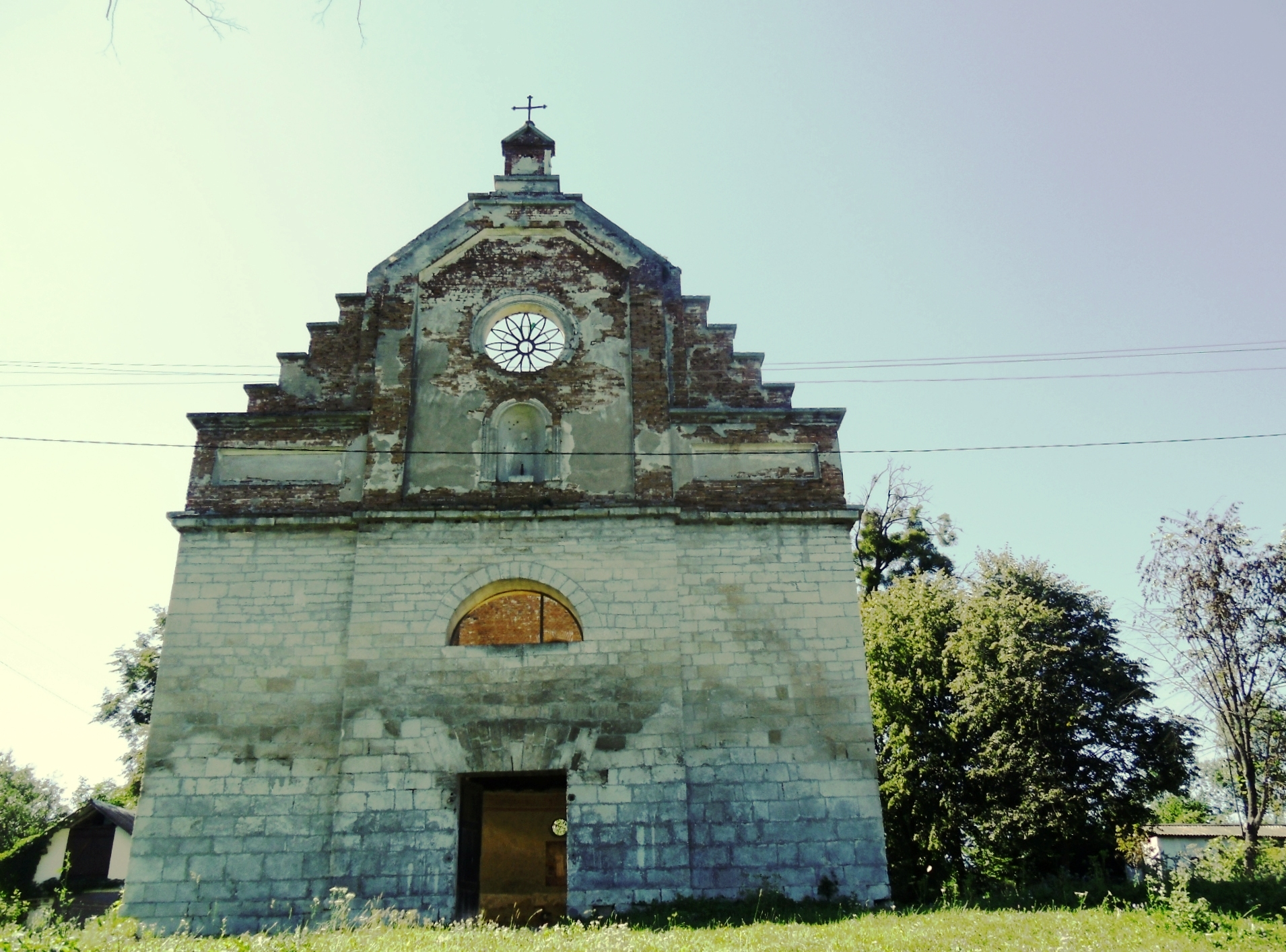
Rakovets. Church of St.Valentine (1856). Is an inactive object.

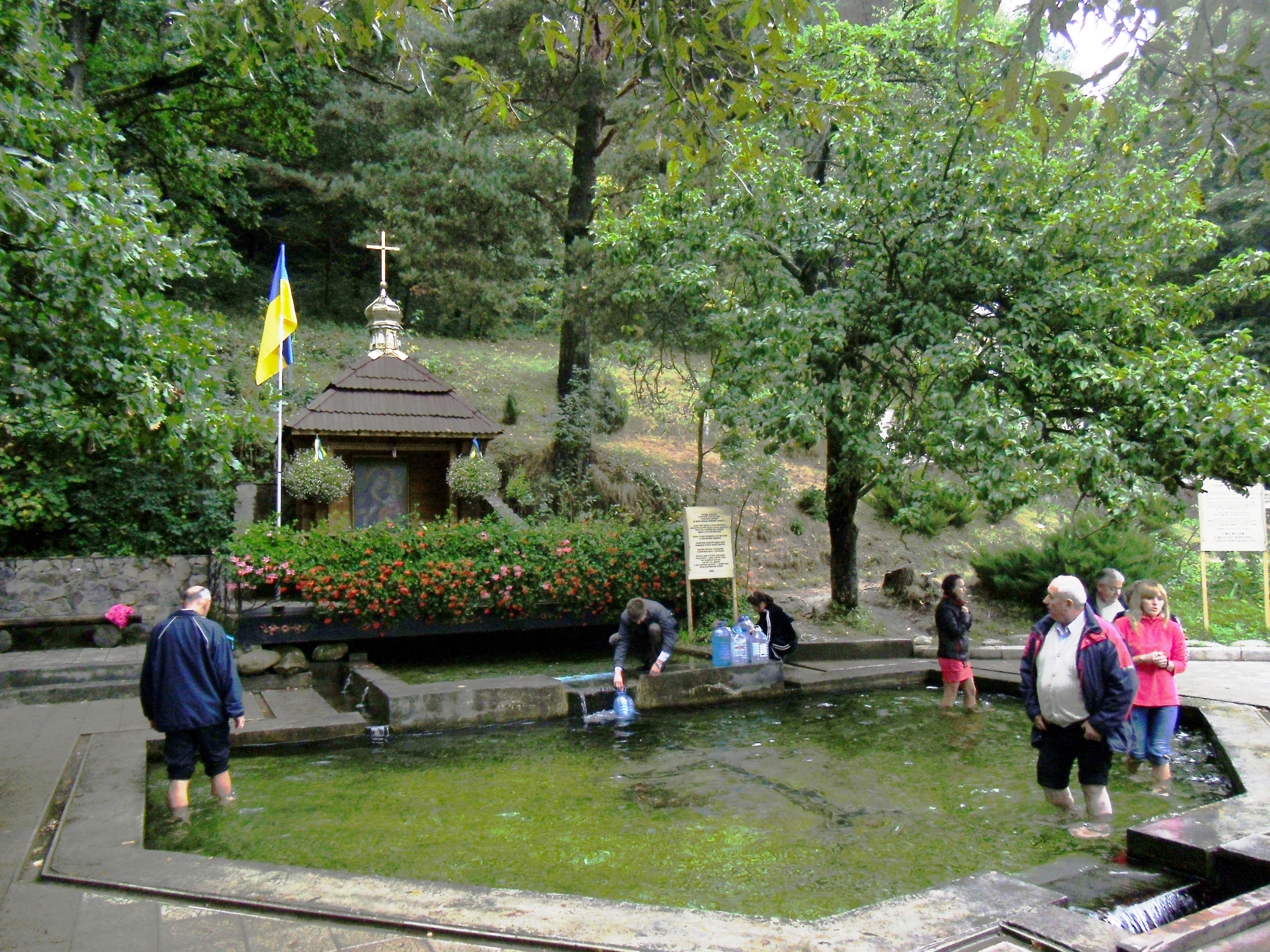
The miraculous spring in the village Rakovets, Pustomyty Raion.

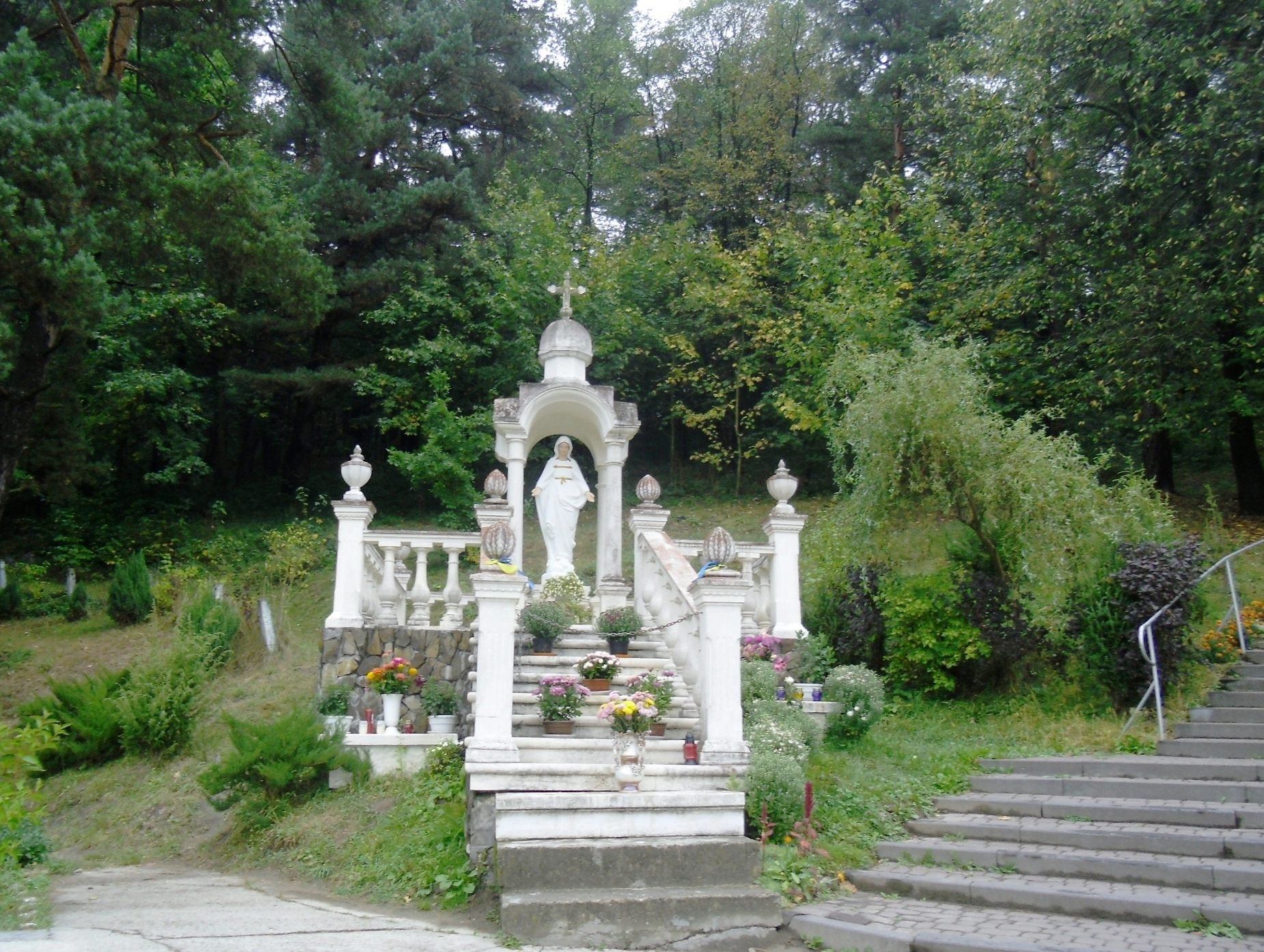
The stone chapel near the miraculous spring in the village Rakovets, Pustomyty Raion

== Literature ==
- Історія міст і сіл УРСР : Львівська область, Пустомитівський район, Раковець. – К. : ГРУРЕ, 1968 р. Page 603 (in Ukrainian)
