= Khorosno =

Rural locality in Lviv Oblast, Ukraine

Khorosno Хоросно
- Location in Lviv Oblast Khorosno (Ukraine)
- Coordinates: 49°38′46″N 23°58′19″E
- Country: Ukraine
- Oblast: Lviv Oblast
- Raion: Lviv Raion
- Hromada: Solonka rural hromada
- Time zone: UTC+2 (EET)
  - Summer (DST): UTC+3 (EEST)
- Postal code: 81164

Khorosno (Ukrainian: Хоросно) is a village in the Solonka rural hromada of the Lviv Raion of Lviv Oblast in Ukraine.

== History ==
The first mention of the village dates back to the 14th century, specifically 22 January 1384. A church (kościół) was built here as early as 1407. As noted in a court case, the parish priest of the Church of the Immaculate Virgin Mary, Ivan from Khorosno, son of Mykola, testifies that he publicly summoned the Lviv parish priest Ivan Rusyn to court in the church.

On 19 July 2020, as a result of the administrative-territorial reform and liquidation of the Rustomyty Raion, the village became part of the Lviv Raion.

== Religion ==
- Church of the Transfiguration (2010, stone-built)
- Dobriany Monastery (near the village, destroyed)

== Bibliography ==
- "Chrusno". Geographical Dictionary of the Kingdom of Poland (in Polish). 1. Warszawa: Kasa im. Józefa Mianowskiego. 1880. p. 648.
