= Siret =

Siret German: Sereth
- Town
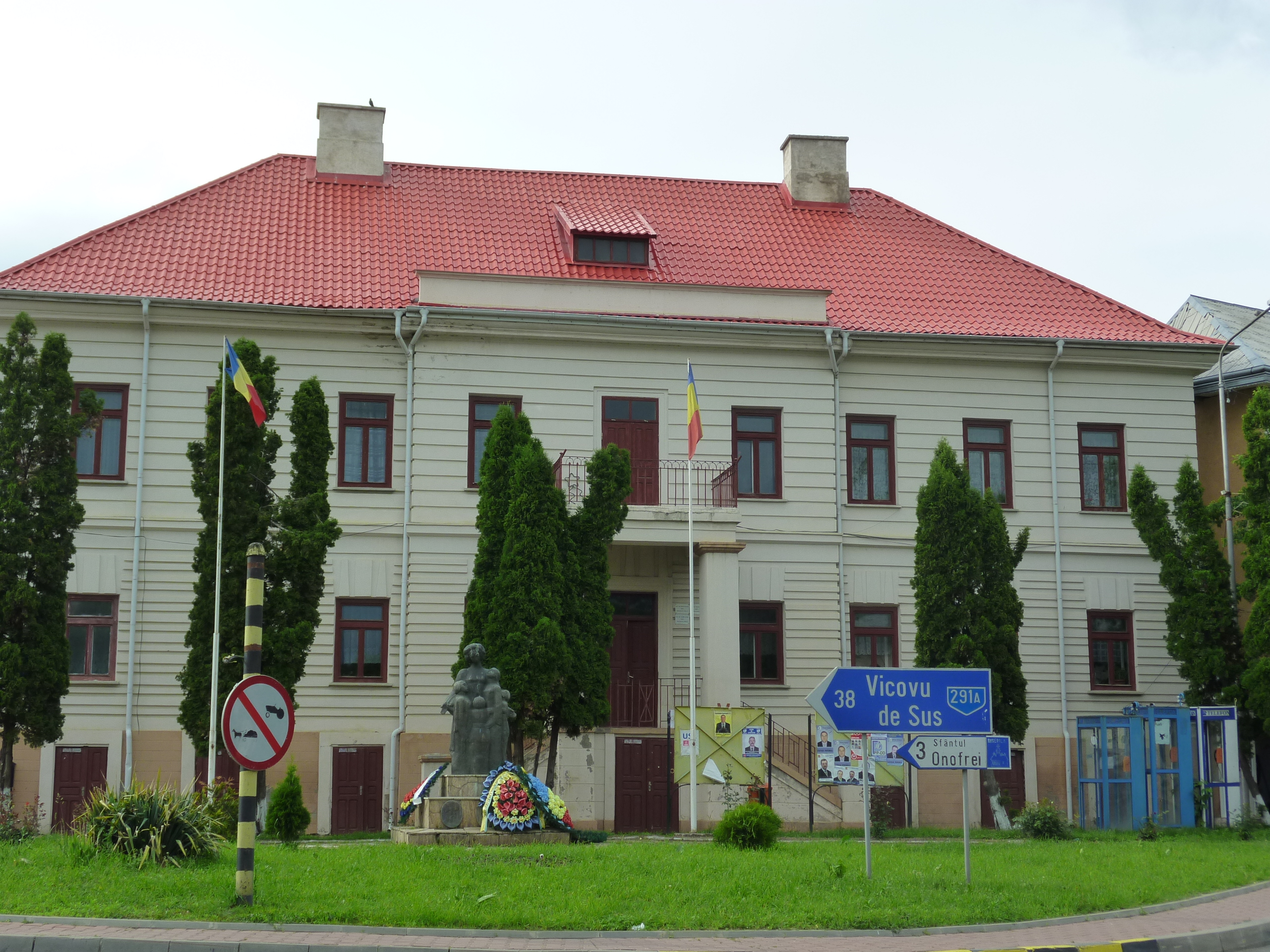
- Former Siret town hall

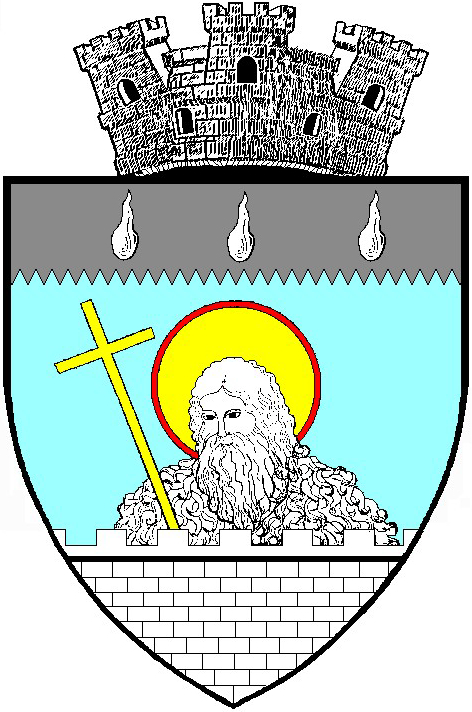
- Coat of arms

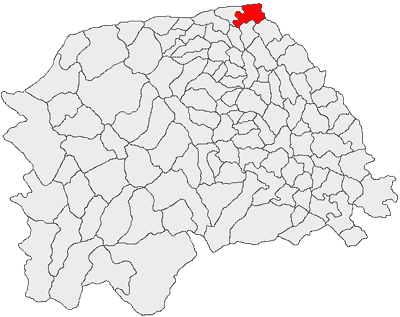
- Location in Suceava County

- Location in Romania
- Coordinates: 47°57′11″N 26°4′21″E
- Country: Romania
- County: Suceava

Government
  - Mayor (2024–2028): Adrian Popoiu (PNL)
- Area: 43.40 km^{2} (16.76 sq mi)
- Elevation: 324 m (1,063 ft)
- Population (2021-12-01): 6,708
  - Density: 154.6/km^{2} (400.3/sq mi)
- Time zone: UTC+02:00 (EET)
  - Summer (DST): UTC+03:00 (EEST)
- Postal code: 725500
- Area code: (+40) 02 30
- Vehicle reg.: SV
- Website: siretromania.ro

Siret (Romanian pronunciation: [siˈret]; German: Sereth; Hungarian: Szeretvásár; Ukrainian: Серет, romanized: Seret; Yiddish: סערעט, romanized: Seret) is a town, municipality and former Latin bishopric in Suceava County, northeastern Romania. It is situated in the historical regions of Bukovina and Moldavia. Siret is the 11th largest urban settlement in the county, with a population of 6,708 inhabitants, according to the 2021 census. It is one of the oldest towns in Romania and was the capital of the medieval Principality of Moldavia during the late 14th century. Furthermore, the town administers two villages: Mănăstioara (German: St. Onufry) and Pădureni.

== Administration and local politics ==
=== Town council ===
The town's former local council had the following political composition, according to the results of the 2020 local elections:

Party	Seats	Current Council
National Liberal Party (PNL)	10	
Social Democratic Party (PSD)	5	

The town's current local council has the following political composition, according to the results of the 2024 local elections:

Party	Seats	Current Council
National Liberal Party (PNL)	8	
Social Democratic Party (PSD)	4	
Alliance for the Union of Romanians (AUR)	2	
Union of the Ukrainians of Romania (UUR/SUR)	1	

== Geography ==
The town of Siret is located at the north-eastern limit of Suceava County, 2 kilometres (1 mile) from the border with Ukraine. It is one of the main border crossing points in the north of Romania, having both a road border post and a rail connection.

Vicșani railway station is west of Siret and functions as the border control point for rail crossings between Romania and the border transit station at Vadul-Siret railway station in Ukraine. The rail is on a standard gauge on the Romanian side and continues as a Russian-style broad gauge into Ukraine. Siret is one of the few places in Romania which provides a gauge change equipment, allowing transportation without transfer.

Siret is situated halfway between Chernivtsi and Suceava, on the right bank of the Siret River. The European route E85 crosses the city.

== History ==
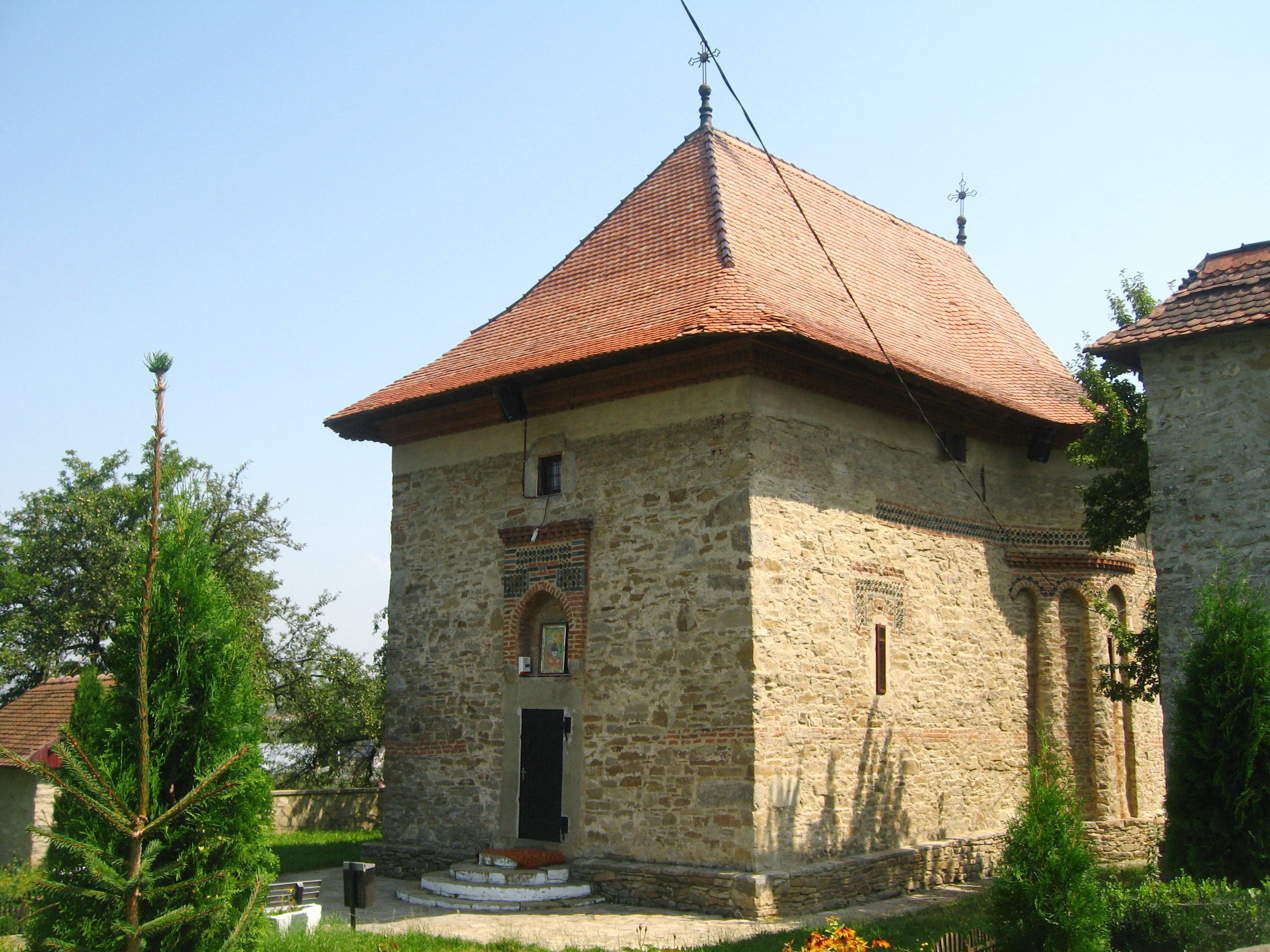
Holy Trinity Church (1352), one of the oldest in Romania

Between 1211 and 1225, on a hill near Siret, a fortress was built by the Teutonic Knights. The town and the Teutonic castle were destroyed by the Tatars in 1241. The first document of Siret dates back to 1339, according to some historical sources. Seret is mentioned as a Russian city in Wallachia in the List of Russian Cities, Far and Near (1370–1390). The town was the capital of the former principality of Moldavia, in the late 14th century.

The Imperial Russian Army occupied the town in 1770, and, as a consequence, an epidemic of cholera broke out. Together with the rest of Bukovina, Siret was under the imperial rule of the Habsburg monarchy (later Austria-Hungary) from 1775 to 1918.

Under the Austro-Hungarian Empire (1774–1918), Siret had a number of important Ukrainian institutions, including branches of the Ruska Besida in Bukovina, the Ukrainska Shkola society, and the Ukrainian bursa.

During World War II, Siret was captured on 3 April 1944 by Soviet troops of the 1st Ukrainian Front in the course of the Dnieper–Carpathian offensive.

== Religions ==
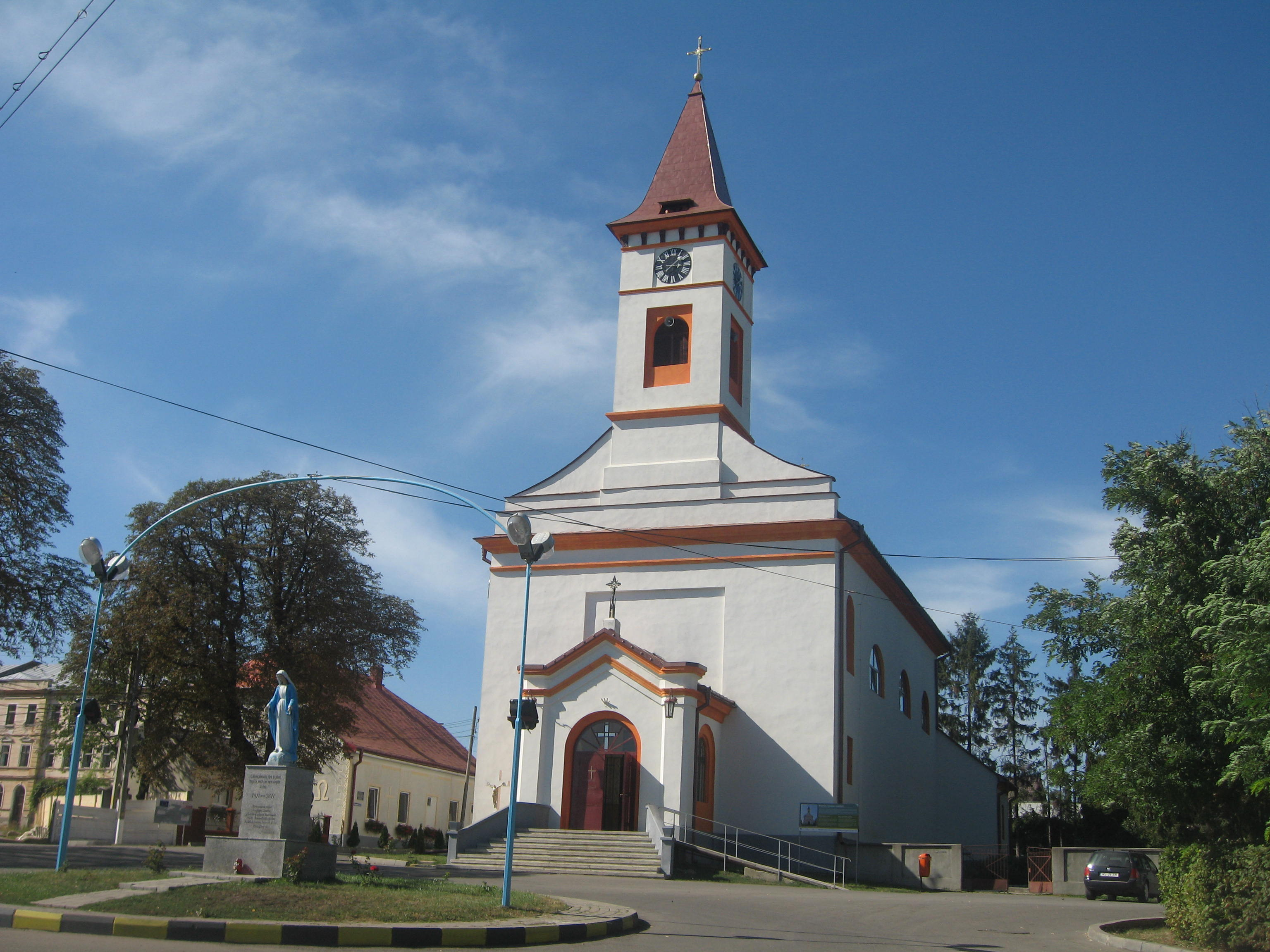
The Roman Catholic in downtown Siret, belonging to the bygone Bukovina German community of the town.

Given the 14th century decline of the Byzantine Empire as Orthodox regional superpower-ally and Latin mendicant orders missions since the 13th century, the prince Bogdan I of Moldavia obtained virtual independence in 1359 as founding voivode (autonomous prince), seeking aid and protection from Poland, welcomed Latin missionaries, Francescans (founding a monastery at Siret in 1340) and Dominicans. His son and indirect successor Lațcu of Moldavia (1365-1373) promised Rome his and the people's conversion to Catholicism and asked Pope Urban V to send missionaries and erect a Latin diocese in his principality's capital, Siret, which happened in 1371, initially directly subject to the Holy See until 1412 when it was made suffragan of the Archbishopric of Lviv (Lwów in Polish; now in Ukraine).

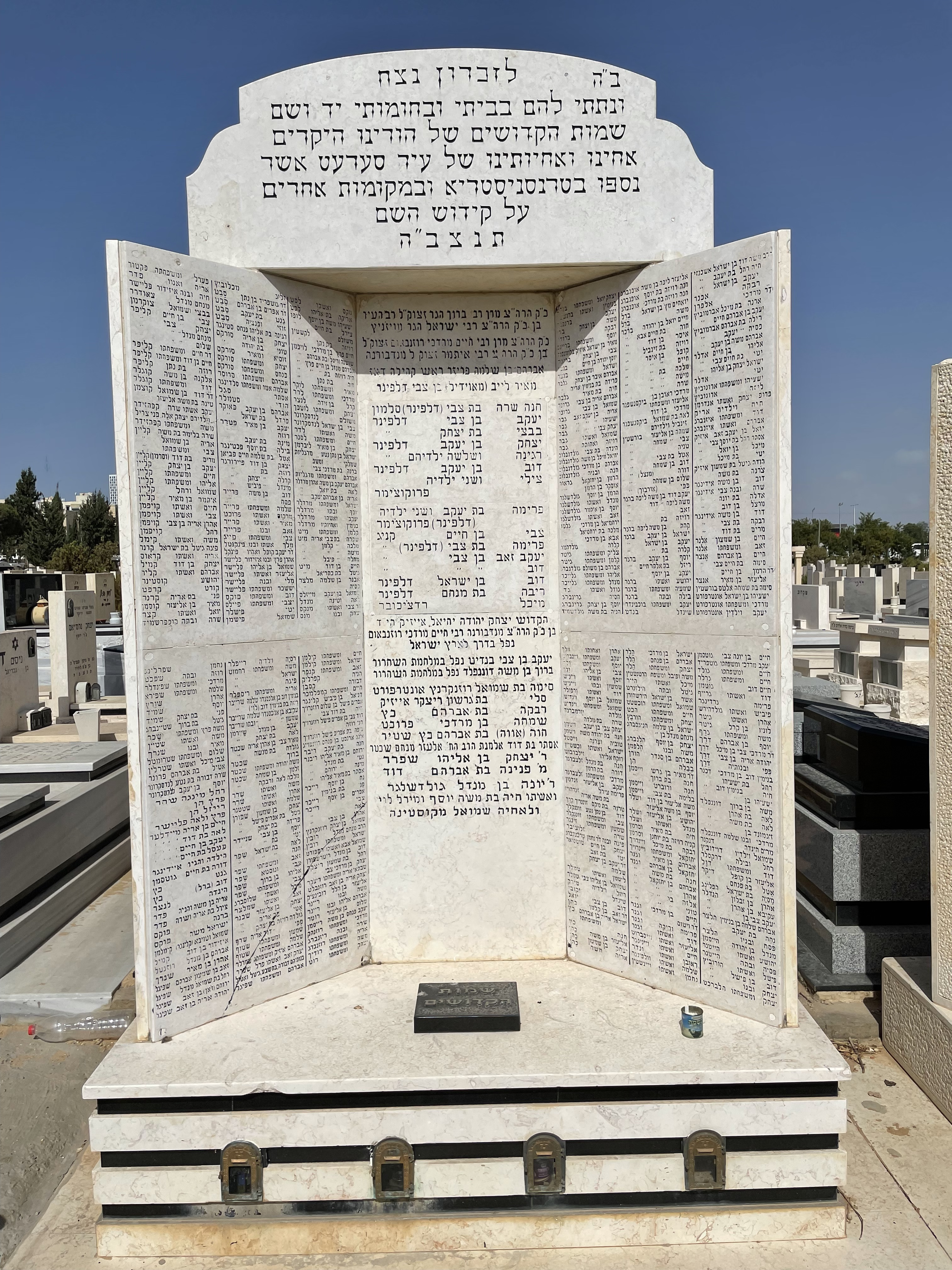
Siret Holocaust memorial, Holon cemetery, Israel

This Roman Catholic Diocese of Siret started to decline in 1388 when prince Petru of Moldavia transferred the Moldavian voivode's capital from Siret to Suceava, and was effectively suppressed, but from circa 1418, the Holy See erected another Moldavian bishopric, the Diocese of Baia, which inherited its territory (c. 1434).

There was a Jewish community by the mid-16th century. Zionist activity began at the turn of the 20th century, a time when most of the local Jews worked in commerce. From 1912 to 1918, the mayor was Jewish and the town council included Jews. During World War I, Jews fled in advance of the Imperial Russian Army, and found their property destroyed when they returned. After the union of Bukovina with Romania, the new authorities revoked licenses for Jewish members of the free professions and removed Jewish officials from their posts. In 1930, there were 2,121 Jews or 14% of the town's population. In 1936, Baruch Hager of the Vizhnitz dynasty was named rabbi and opened a yeshiva. During the interwar period, there was activity by Zionist youth movements. On 20 June 1941, just before Romania's entry into World War II, the authorities of the Ion Antonescu regime forced the Jews of Siret to march to Dornești before transporting them to Craiova and Calafat and finally Transnistria (see The Holocaust in Romania). Soviet troops liberated 460 Siret Jews there in 1944; 400 of them subsequently left for Palestine. Out of 1,614 Jews who lived in Siret in 1941, more than 700 died in Transnistria according to The YIVO Encyclopedia of Jews in Eastern Europe. The survival rate was lower than the 70% or more than 70% of the southern Bukovinian Jews who survived the deportations to Transnistria. On March 14, 1944, Romania's military dictator Ion Antonescu allowed the repatriation of all the Jews deported to Transnistria.

Today, most of the population is Romanian Orthodox, with Roman Catholic, Pentecostal, Greek-Catholic, and several Evangelical Christian minorities.

== Demographics ==
Historical population
Year	Pop.	±%
1910	7,948	—
1930	9,905	+24.6%
1948	8,058	−18.6%
1956	5,664	−29.7%
1966	8,018	+41.6%
1977	8,264	+3.1%
1992	10,071	+21.9%
2002	9,329	−7.4%
2011	7,721	−17.2%
2021	6,708	−13.1%
Source: Austrian and Romanian census data and/or official estimates

Siret reached its peak population in 1992, when more than 10,000 people were living within the town limits. In 2016, Siret had a population of c. 10,000 inhabitants.

At the 2021 census, the town had a population of 6,708. According to the 2011 census data, 7,721 inhabitants lived in Siret, a decrease from the figure recorded at the 2002 census, when the town had a population of 9,329 inhabitants. In 2011, of the total population, 95.85% were ethnic Romanians, 2.55% Ukrainians, 0.72% Poles, 0.42% Germans (Bukovina Germans), and 0.28% Russians (Lipovans). Siret is the eleventh most populated urban locality in Suceava County.

== Notable natives ==
- Yitzhak Artzi - Israeli politician
- Elisabeth Axmann - Romanian-German poet
- Mykhailo Mykhailyuk - Ukrainian poet
- Elisabeta Lipă - Romanian rower
- Ivan Pavlovich Maksimovich - Ukrainian Colonel of the UGA
- Antin Varivoda - Ukrainian Commander of the Legion of Ukrainian Sich Riflemen; Colonel of the Ukrainian Galician Army

== International relations ==
Siret is a member of the Douzelage, a unique town twinning association of 24 towns across the European Union. This active program began in 1991, and regular events, such as a produce market from each of the other countries and festivals. Discussions regarding membership are also in hand with three additional towns (Agros in Cyprus, Škofja Loka in Slovenia, and Tryavna in Bulgaria).

=== Twin towns – sister cities ===
Siret is twinned with:

- Altea, Spain - 1991
- Bad Kötzting, Germany - 1991
- Bellagio, Italy - 1991
- (Republic of Ireland) Bundoran, Ireland - 1991
- Granville, France - 1991
- Holstebro, Denmark - 1991
- Houffalize, Belgium - 1991
- Meerssen, Netherlands - 1991
- Niederanven, Luxembourg - 1991
- Preveza, Greece - 1991
- Sesimbra, Portugal - 1991
- Sherborne, United Kingdom - 1991
- Karkkila, Finland - 1997
- Oxelösund, Sweden - 1998
- Judenburg, Austria - 1999
- Chojna, Poland - 2004
- Kőszeg, Hungary - 2004
- Sigulda, Latvia - 2004
- Sušice, Czech Republic - 2004
- Türi, Estonia - 2004
- Zvolen, Slovakia - 2007
- Rokiškis, Lithuania - 2018
- Marsaskala, Malta - 2009
- Dębica, Poland

== Gallery ==
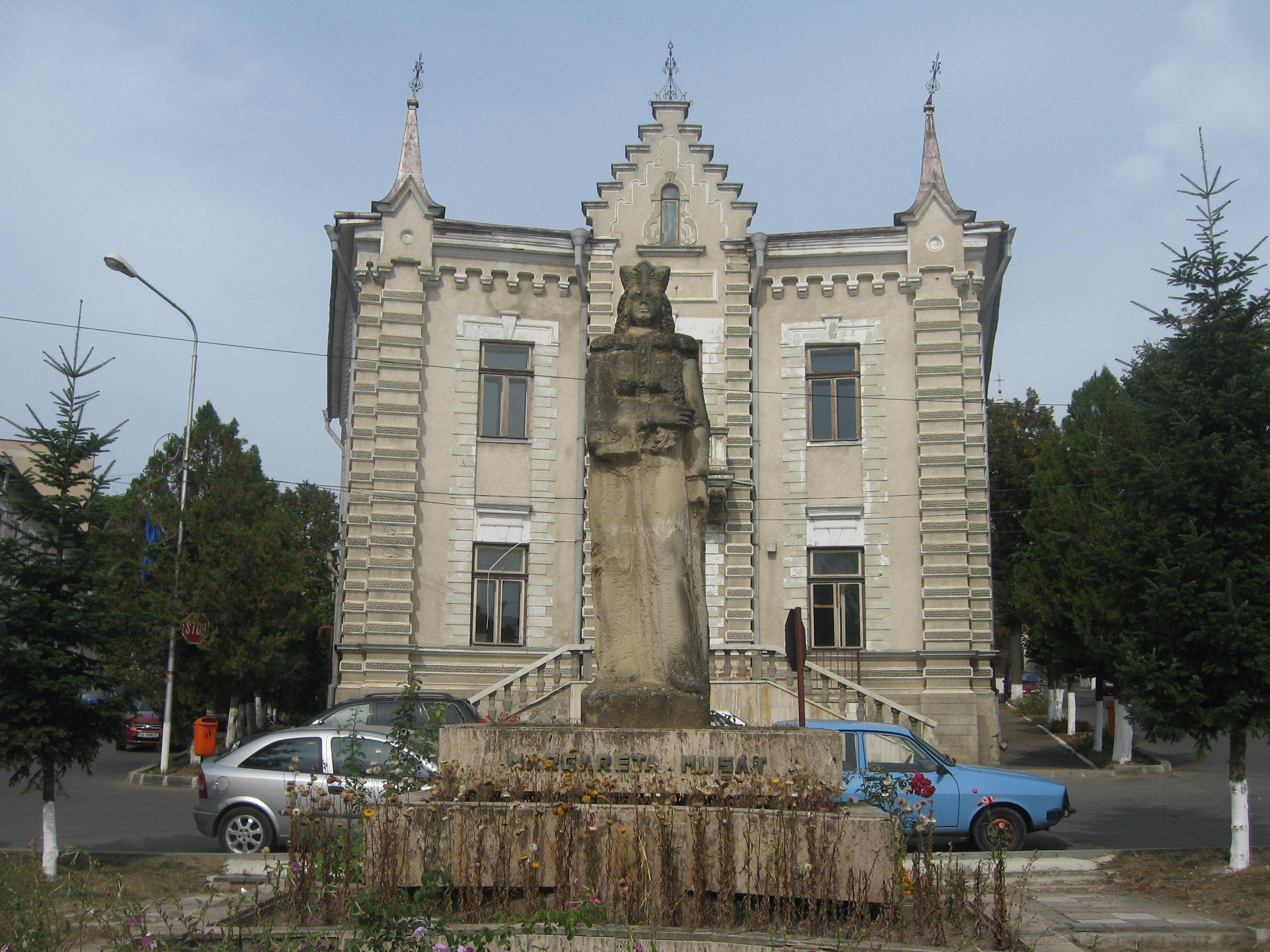
Statue of Margareta Mușat in downtown Siret

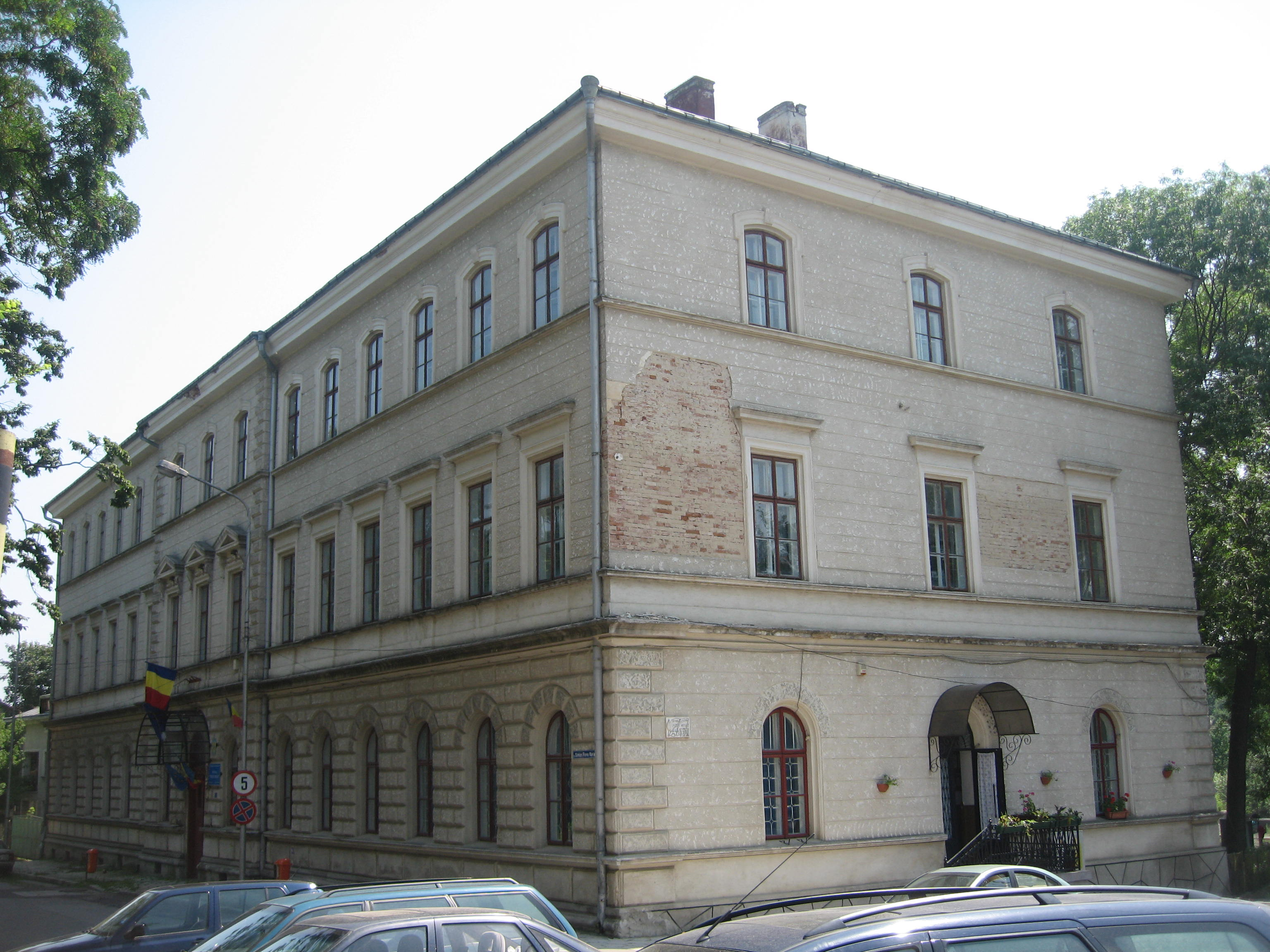
Petru Mușat High School

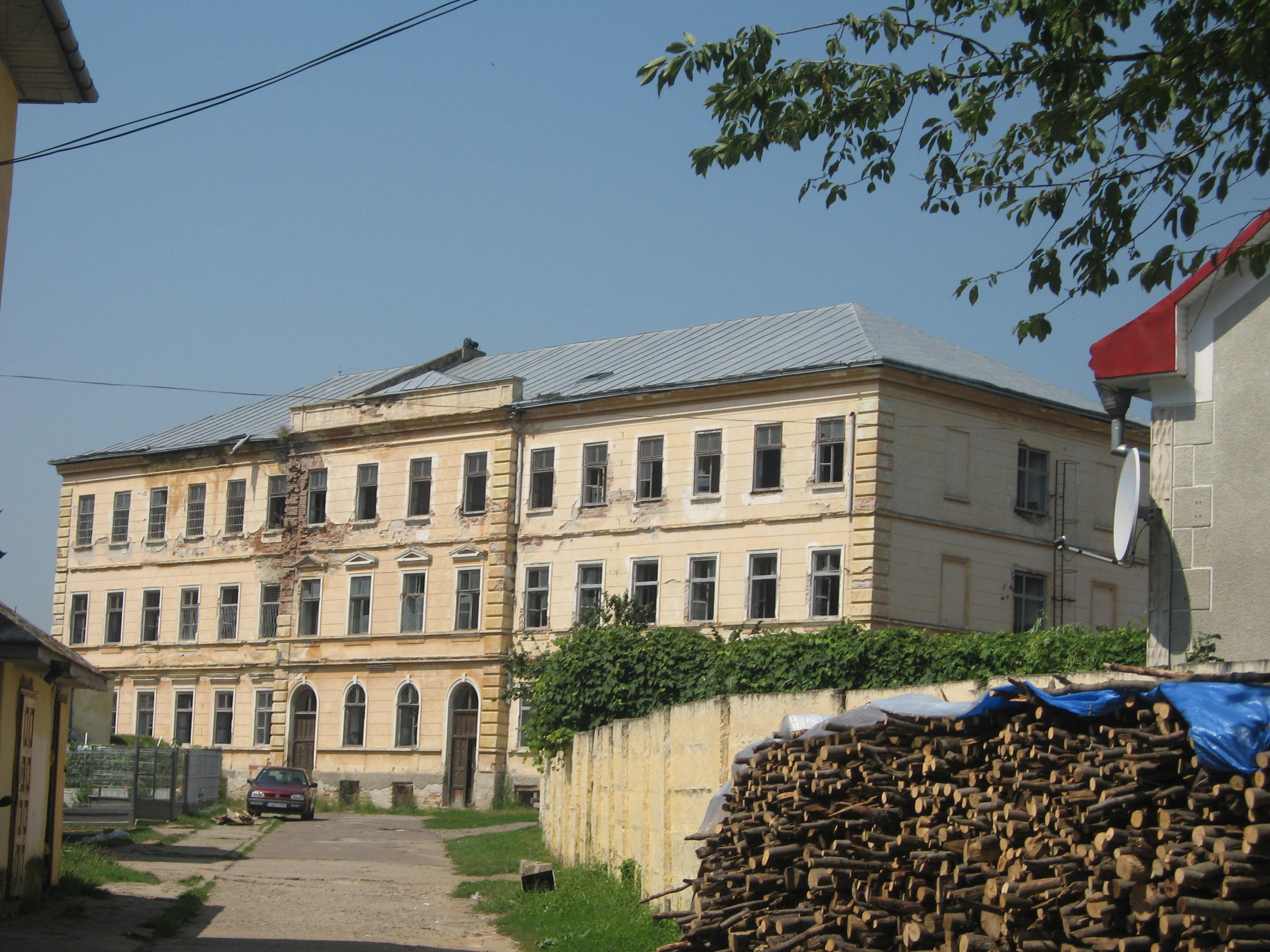
The Chronic Diseases Hospital

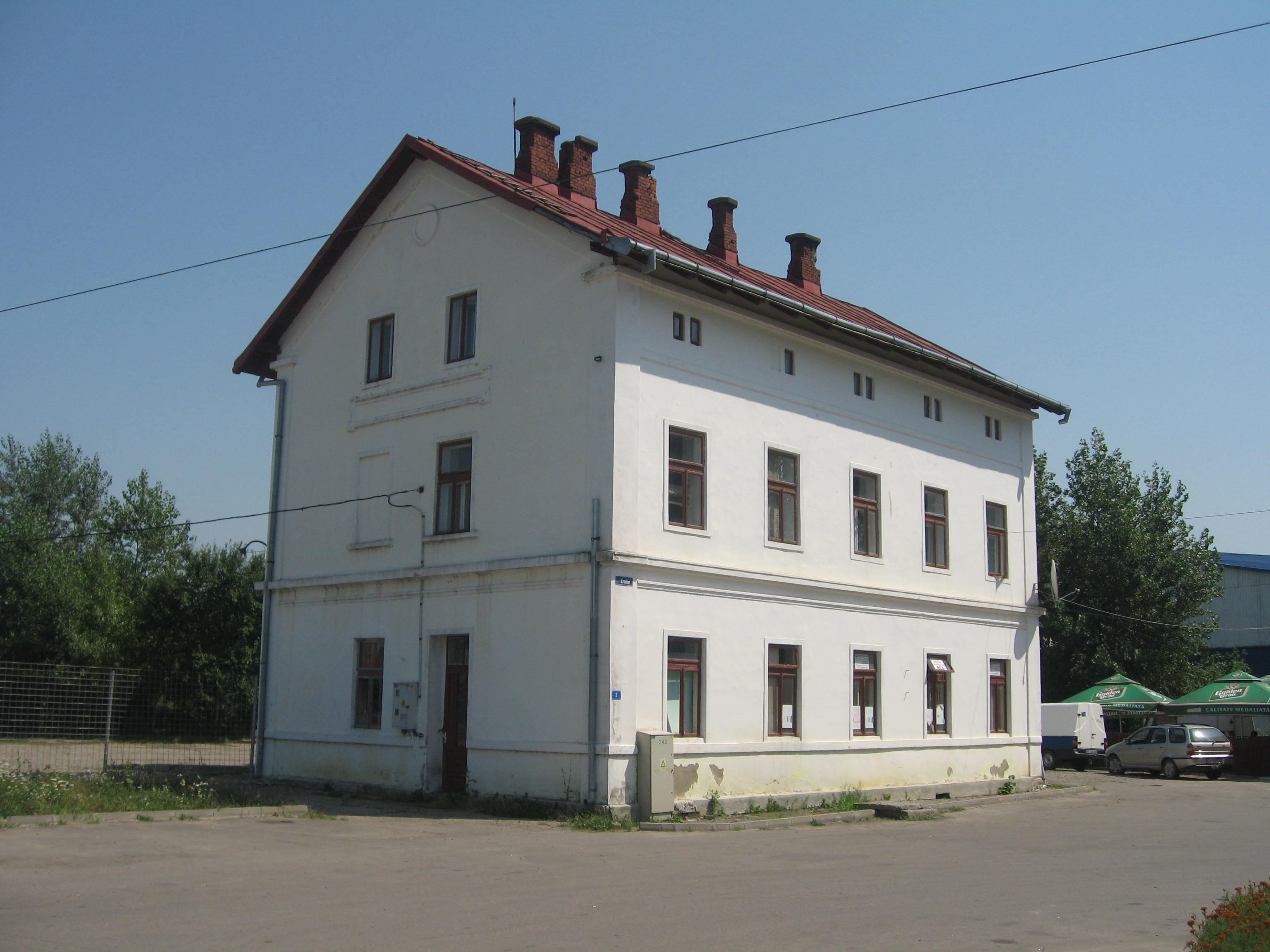
The Old Train Station

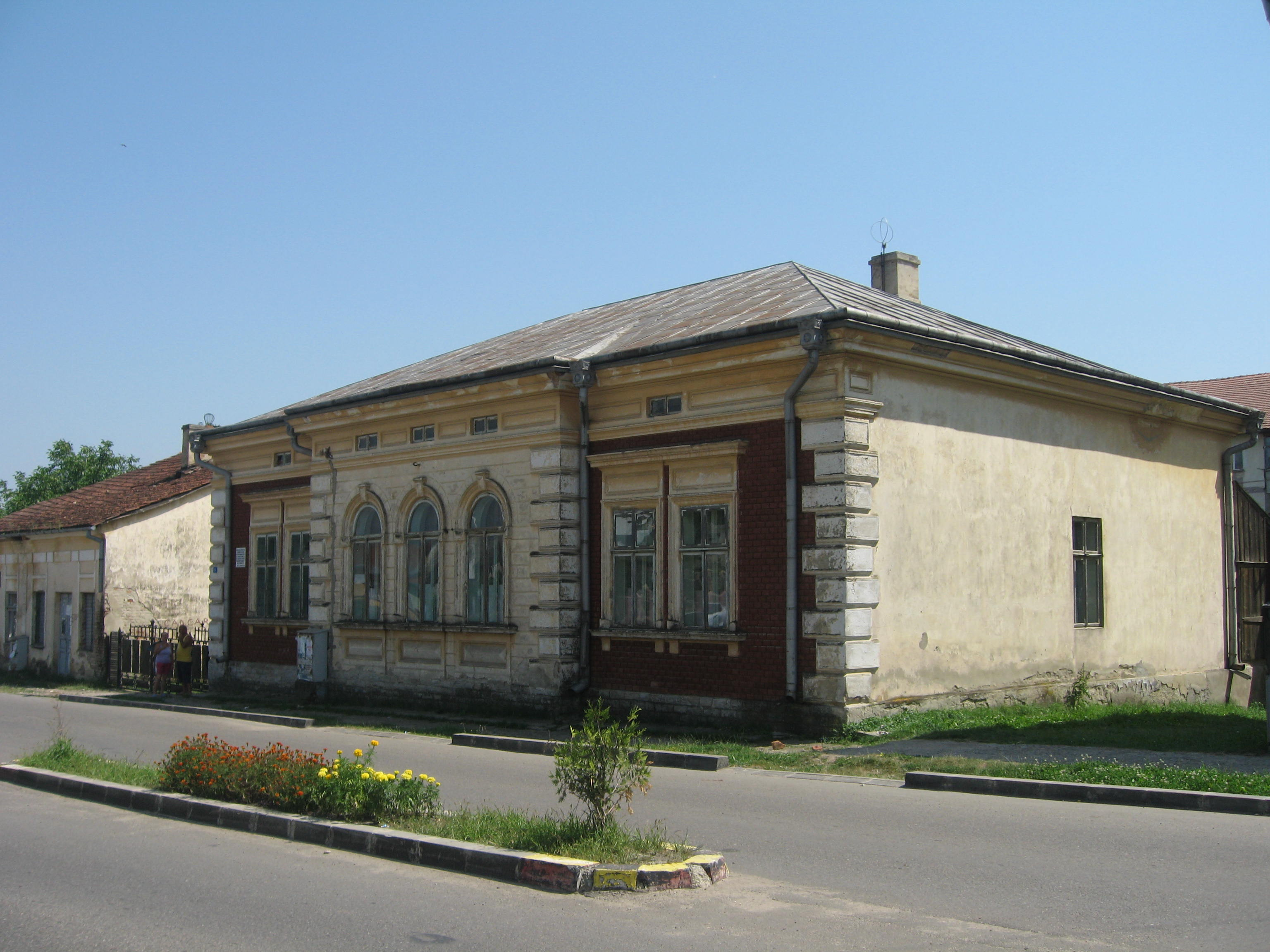
Iacob Zadik House

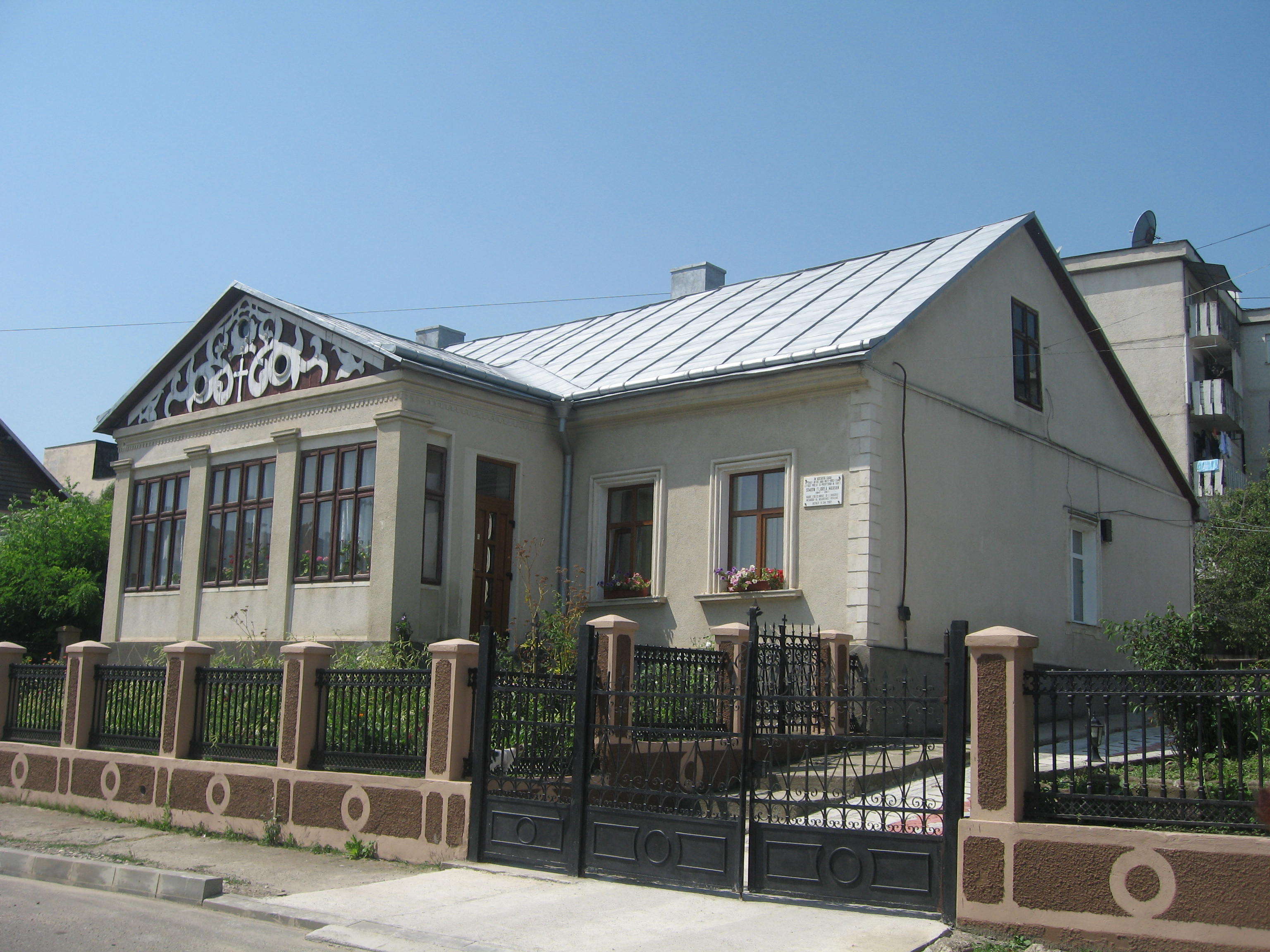
Simion Florea Marian House

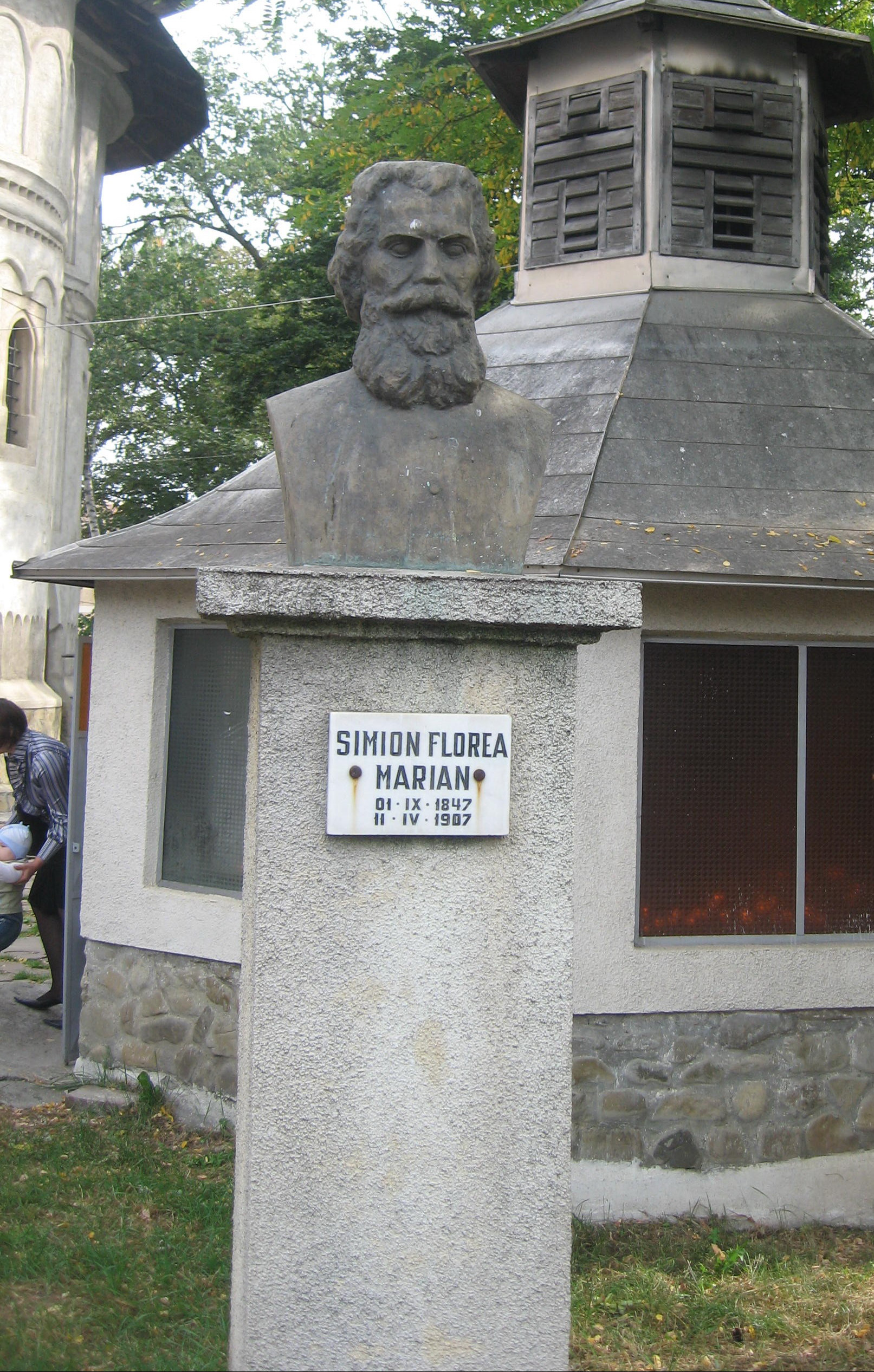
Simion Florea Marian Statue

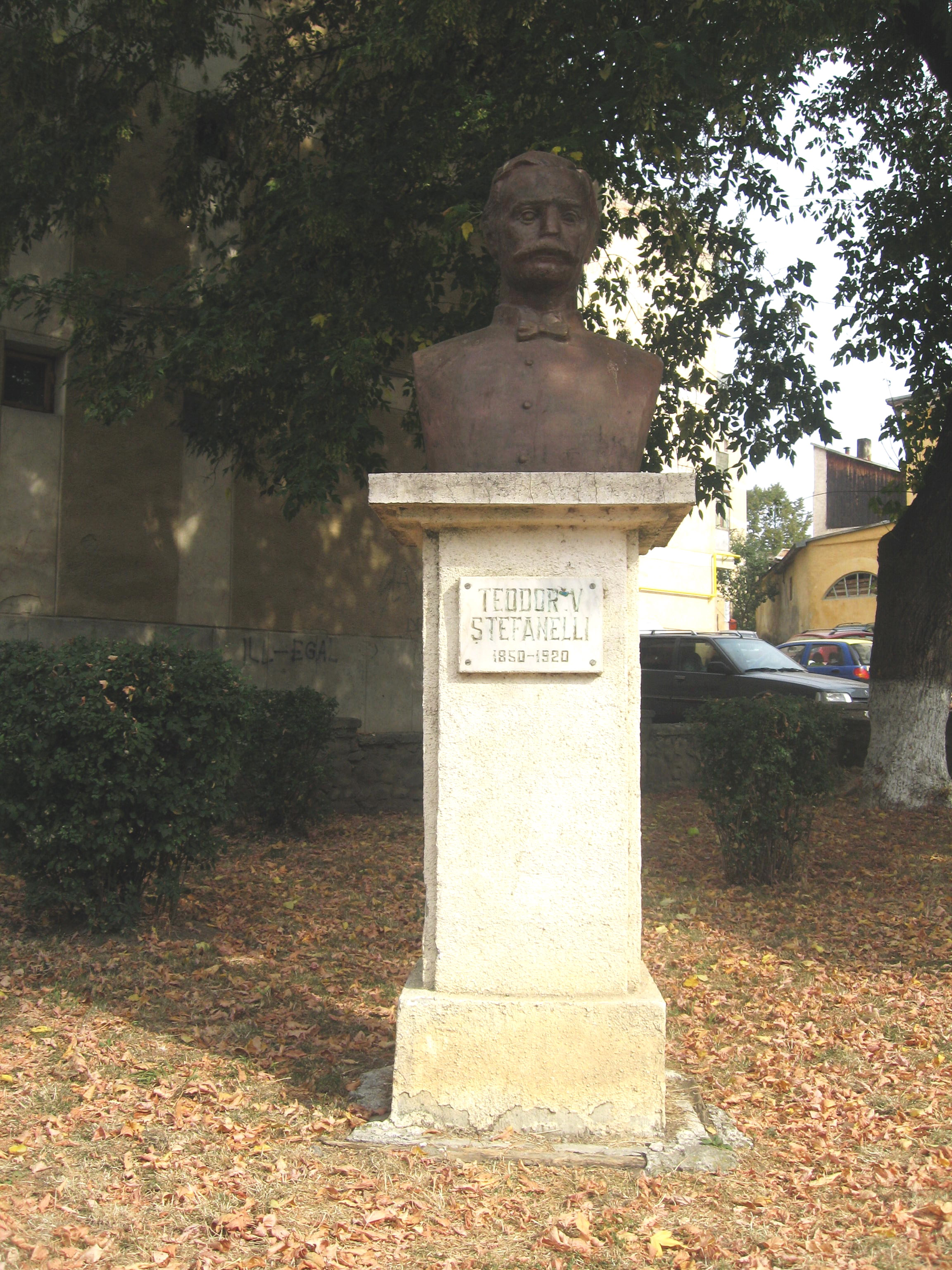
Teodor V. Ștefanelli Statue

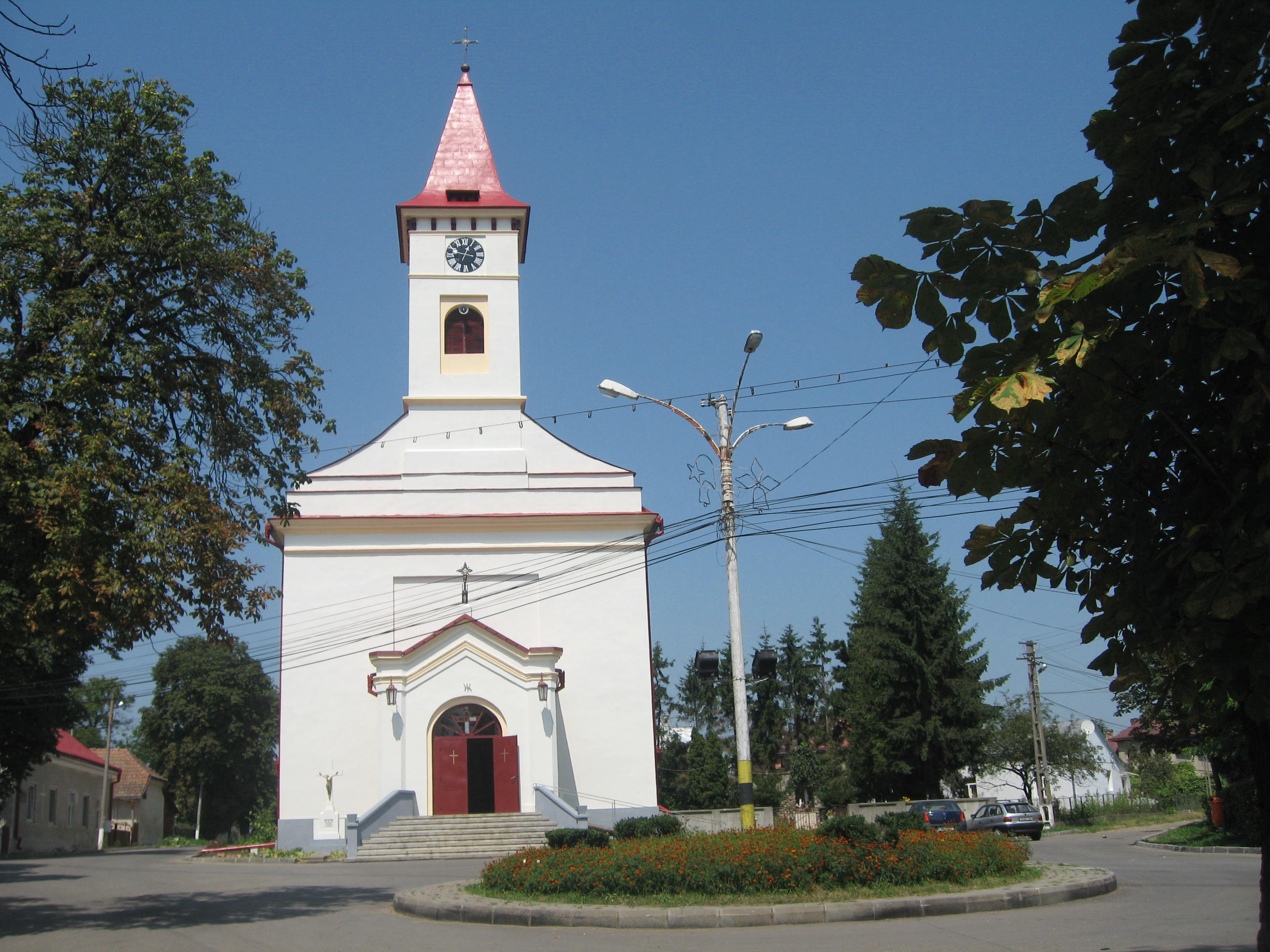
The Roman Catholic Church

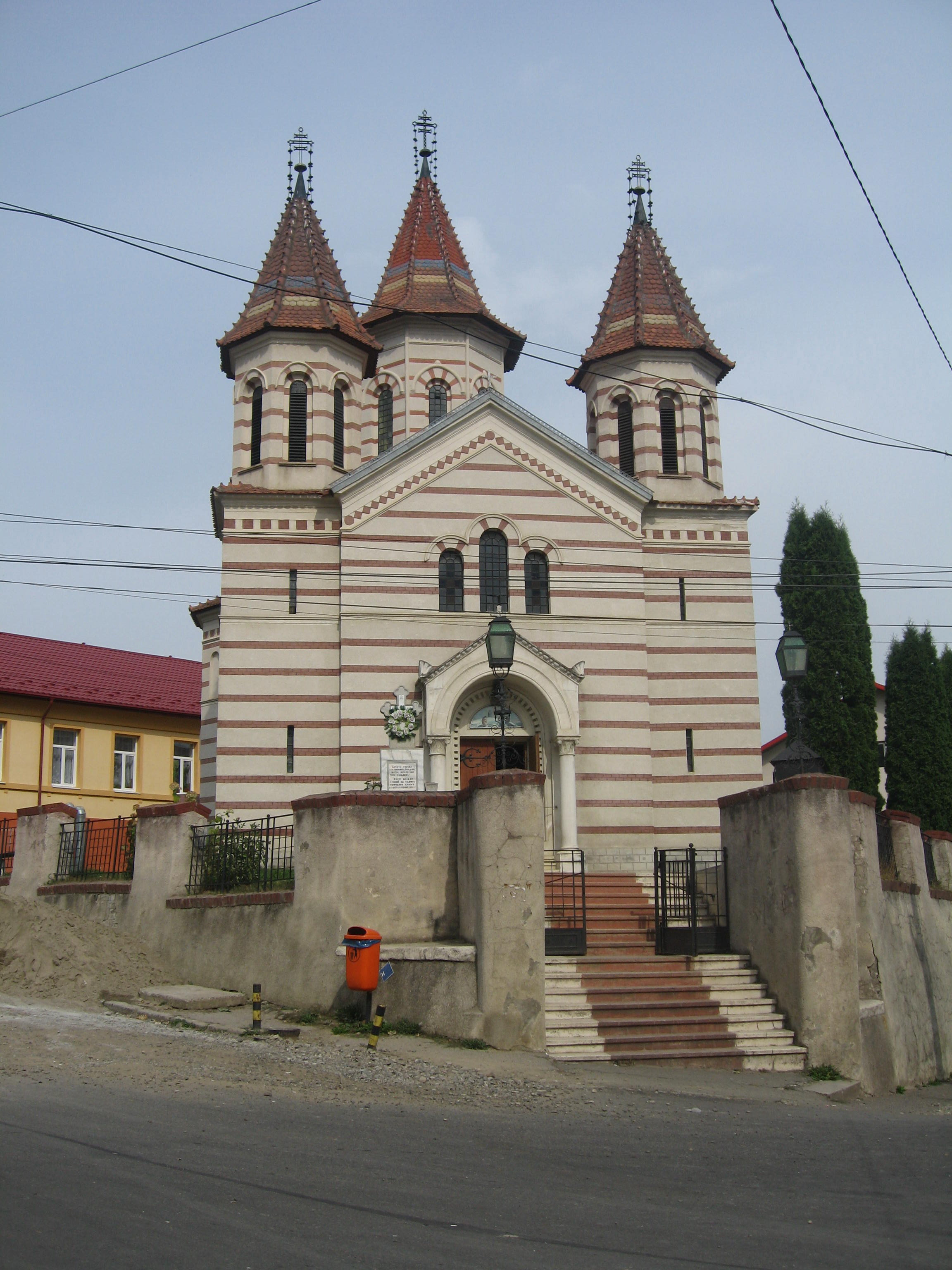
The Ukrainian Greek Catholic Church

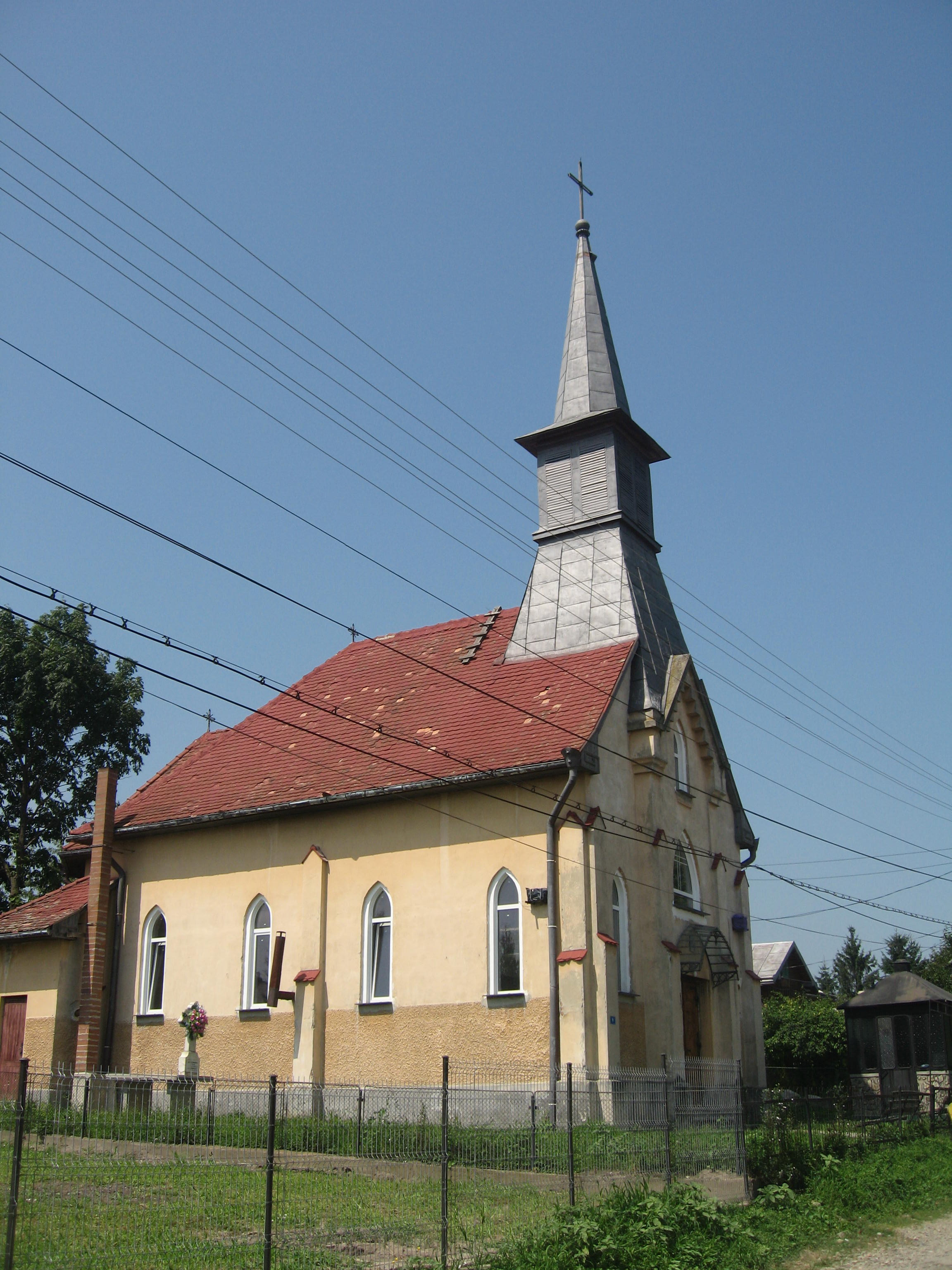
The Old Evangelical Church (now Orthodox)

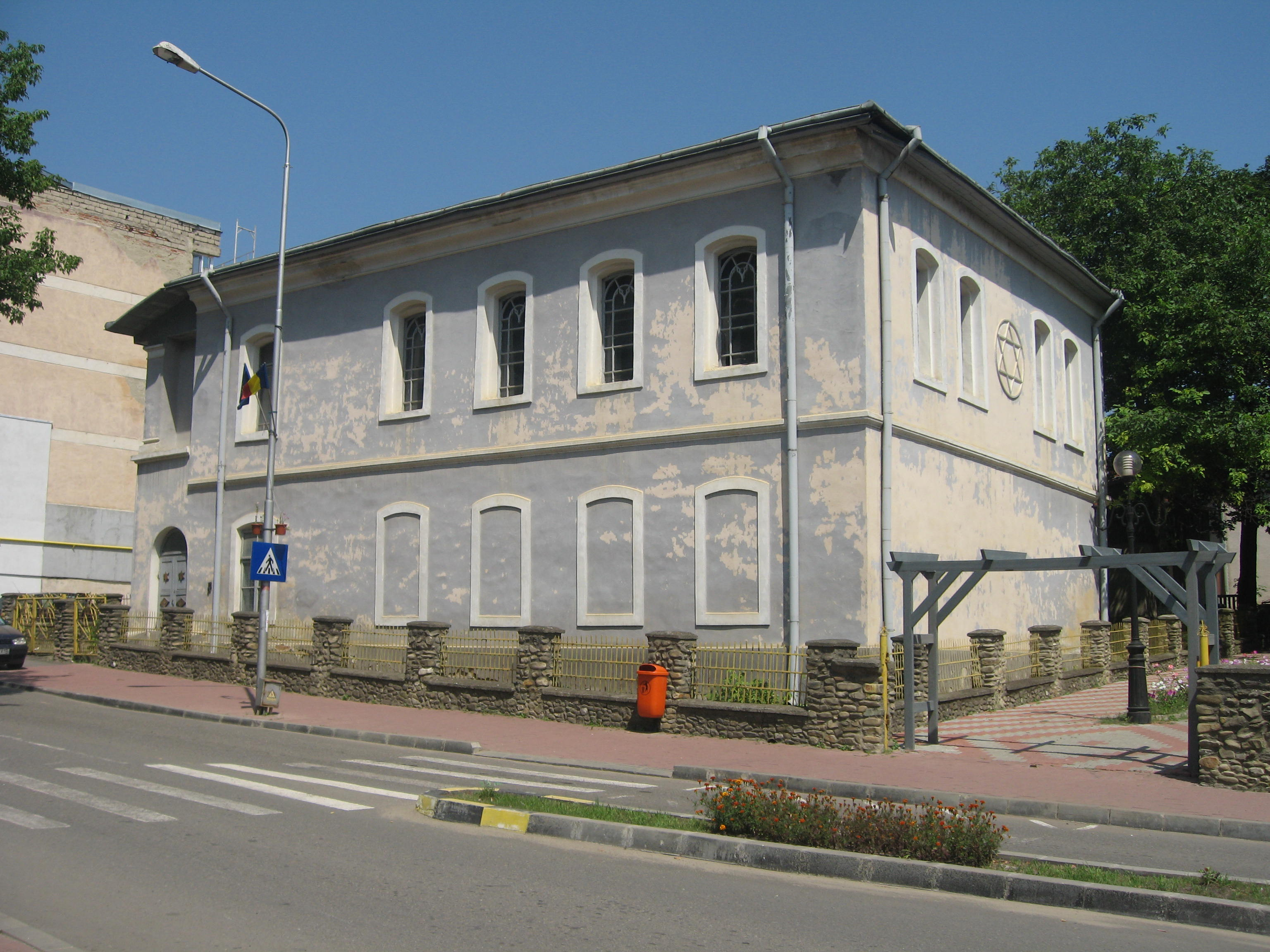
The Jewish Temple
