= Derevach =

Rural locality in Lviv Oblast, Ukraine

Derevach Деревач
- Location in Lviv Oblast Derevach (Ukraine)
- Coordinates: 49°40′2″N 24°0′10″E
- Country: Ukraine
- Oblast: Lviv Oblast
- Raion: Lviv Raion
- Hromada: Solonka rural hromada
- Time zone: UTC+2 (EET)
  - Summer (DST): UTC+3 (EEST)
- Postal code: 81164

Derevach (Ukrainian: Деревач) is a village in the Solonka rural hromada of the Lviv Raion of Lviv Oblast in Ukraine.

== History ==
A Kyivan Rus' fortified settlement dating back to the 11th–13th centuries was located near the modern village of Derevach.

The first written mention of the village was in 26 January 1561.

On 19 July 2020, as a result of the administrative-territorial reform and liquidation of the Pustomyty Raion, the village became part of the Lviv Raion.

== Religion ==
- Dobriany Monastery (near the village, destroyed)

== Bibliography ==
- "Derewacz (2)". Geographical Dictionary of the Kingdom of Poland (in Polish). 2. Warszawa: Kasa im. Józefa Mianowskiego. 1881. p. 6.
