= Mykhailo Mykhailyuk =

Romanian poet, novelist, and literary critic (born 1940)

- Born: 1 October 1940 (age 85); Siret, Romania
- Citizenship: Romanian
- Education: University of Bucharest
- Writing career
- Language: Ukrainian
- Genres: Poetry; novels; essays
- Notable awards: Olga Kobylyanska Literary and Artistic Prize (2015)

Mykhailo Ilkovych Mykhailyuk (Ukrainian: Миха́йло І́лькович Михайлю́к) (born 1 October 1940) is a Romanian poet, novelist, and literary critic of Ukrainian ethnicity.

== Biography ==
He was born on 1 October 1940 in the town of Siret, Romania. He graduated from the Faculty of Philology of the University of Bucharest (1964), worked in the newspaper "New Age", and was editor in chief of the Ukrainian newspaper "Our Voice" (since 1990). He was the editor-in-Chief of the Ukrainian Herald magazine of the Union of Ukrainians of Romania.

He is the author of poetry collections Інтермеццо (1971), Дума про батька (1990); collections of prose works Біле-пребіле поле (1974); novels Криниця під каменем, Синій смуток фіордів (1981), Міст без поруччя (1988); works for children Мурчик кіт упав з воріт (1975); essay on Ukrainian poetry in Romania Слово про слово (1983), and the collection of journalism 45 років з українським пером.

He edited the collection of literary and other artistic essays and reports Про землю і хліб (1972), wrote a number of prefaces to Romanian editions of works by Ivan Franko, Hryhorii Kvitka-Osnovianenko, Yuriy Fedkovych and articles on the works of Taras Shevchenko, Lesya Ukrainka, Vasyl Stefanyk, and Mykhailo Kotsiubynsky.

In 2002, Mihai Eminescu's collection "Poetry" was published by Elion Publishing House (Bucharest), in which the texts are presented in parallel - in Romanian and the Ukrainian translation by Mykhailyuk.

== Honours and awards ==
- Olga Kobylyanska Literary and Artistic Prize (2015)

== Literature ==
- Tkachuk S. A few words about "Word about word" by Mykhailo Mykhailyuk // Horizons. - Bucharest: Criterion, 1985. - P. 127–135.
- Ukrainian diaspora: literary figures, works, biobibliographic information / Order. VA Prosalova . - Donetsk: Eastern Publishing House, 2012. - 516 p.
- Mykhailyuk Mykhailo Ilkovych . Ukrainian literary encyclopedia . - T. 3. - K., 1995.

== Sources ==
- Stirbets, Khrystyna (14 August 2014). Artistic and literary evening in Bucharest . Template: Radio România Internaţional.
