= Vovkiv, Solonka rural hromada, Lviv Raion, Lviv Oblast =

Rural locality in Lviv Oblast, Ukraine

Vovkiv Вовків
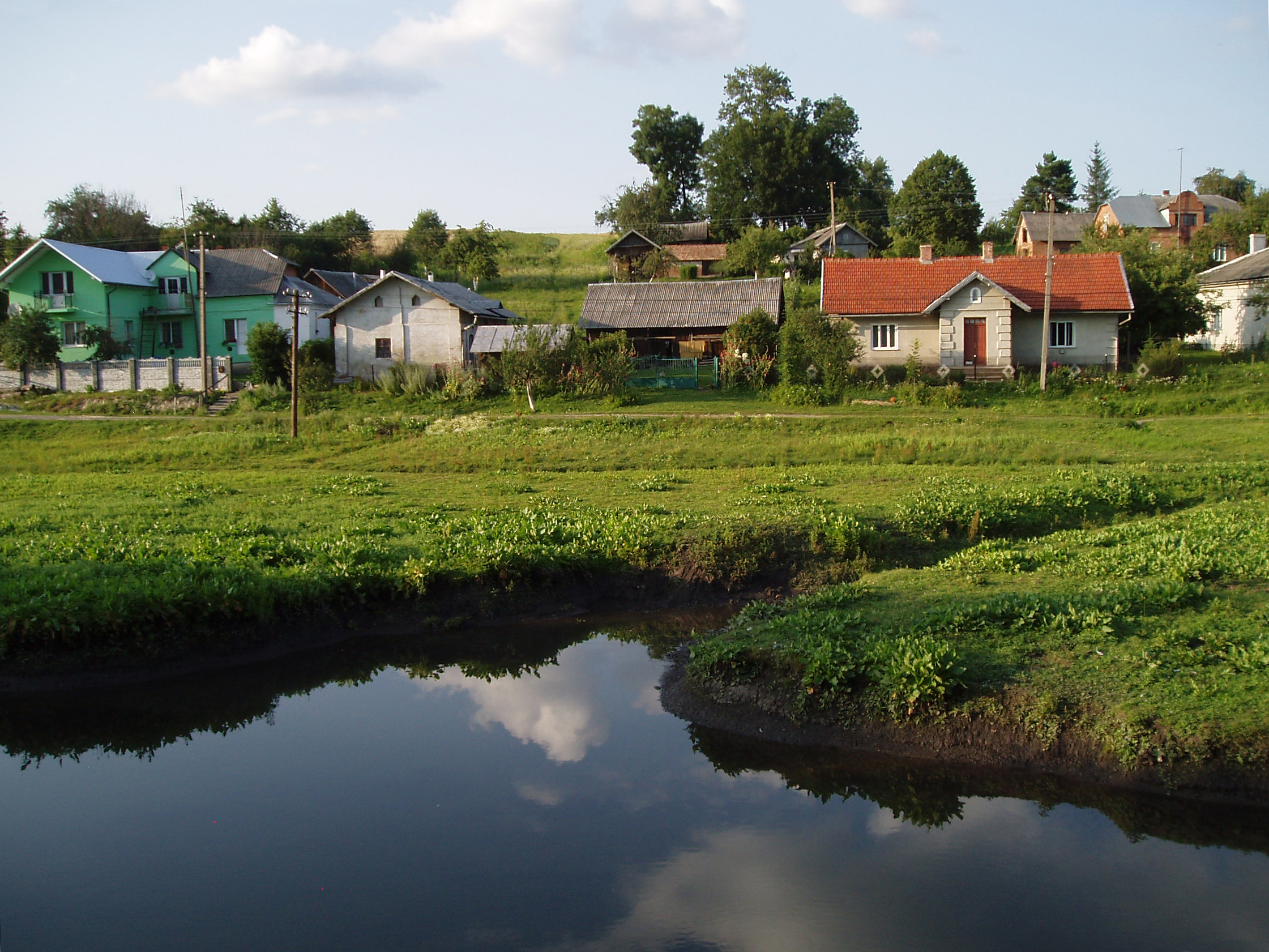

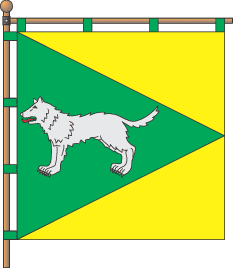
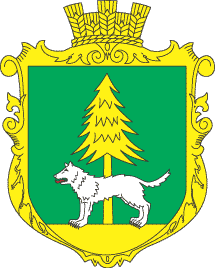
- Flag Coat of arms

- Location in Lviv Oblast Vovkiv (Ukraine)
- Coordinates: 49°42′46″N 24°4′25″E
- Country: Ukraine
- Oblast: Lviv Oblast
- Raion: Lviv Raion
- Hromada: Solonka rural hromada
- Time zone: UTC+2 (EET)
  - Summer (DST): UTC+3 (EEST)
- Postal code: 81139

Vovkiv (Ukrainian: Вовків) is a village in the Solonka rural hromada of the Lviv Raion of Lviv Oblast in Ukraine.

== History ==
The village is known from 1447.

After the liquidation of the Pustomyty Raion on 19 July 2020, the village became part of the Lviv Raion.

== Religion ==
- Church of the Presentation of Virgin Mary with a bell tower (1706, wooden, architectural monuments of local importance),
- Saint Mary Magdalene church (1929, designed by architect Bronisław Wiktor, RCC).

== Monuments ==
A monument to Kornylo Ustiyanovych erected on the territory of the Ustianovych Museum-Estate.

== Notable residents ==
- Kornylo Ustiyanovych (1839–1903), Ukrainian painter, writer and folklorist
- Ruslan Zabranskyi (born 1971), Ukrainian professional football

Ivan Franko visited the village; the Czech ethnographer František Řehoř lived there.

== Sources ==
- "Wołków (1)". Geographical Dictionary of the Kingdom of Poland (in Polish). 13. Warszawa: Kasa im. Józefa Mianowskiego. 1893. p. 871.
