= Solonka, Ukraine =

Village in Lviv Oblast, Ukraine

Solonka Солонка
- Village
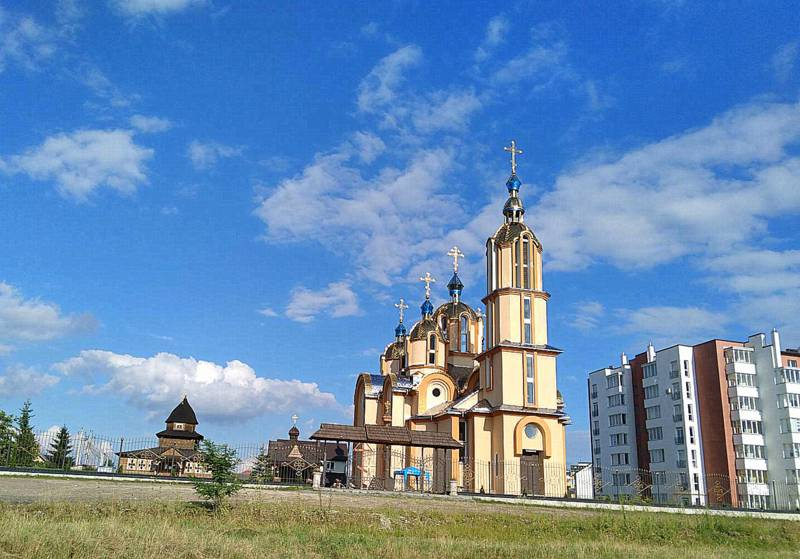
- The Church of the Nativity of the Blessed Virgin Mary in Solonka

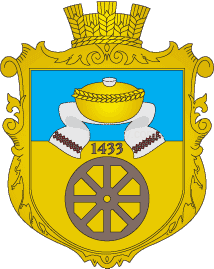
- Coat of arms

- Location of Solonka in Lviv Oblast Location of Solonka in Ukraine
- Coordinates: 49°44′24″N 24°01′48″E
- Country: Ukraine
- Oblast: Lviv Oblast
- Raion: Lviv Raion
- Hromada: Solonka rural hromada
- First mentioned: 15th century

Population
  - Total: 7,476

Solonka (Ukrainian: Солонка; Polish: Sołonka) is a village in Lviv Raion, Lviv Oblast, in western Ukraine. It is the capital of Solonka rural hromada, one of the hromadas of Ukraine. Its population is 7,476 (as of 2024).

== Overview ==
Solonka was first mentioned in the 15th century. There was an anti-serfdom uprising led by peasants in the village during the 16th century. Following the Soviet annexation of Eastern Galicia and Volhynia in 1939, a sovkhoz was established in the village under the name "Victory".

Solonka is home to multiple churches, belonging to both the Ukrainian Greek Catholic Church (such as the 2011 Church of the Holy Trinity) and the Orthodox Church of Ukraine (including the 1939 Church of the Nativity of the Holy Virgin Mary). One such Orthodox church in the village, the Church of the Transfiguration of the Lord, was consecrated by Metropolitan Epiphanius of Kyiv in 2022.

== Notable people ==
- Ihor Derkach, politician, head of Ukrainian Youth Association
- Yaroslav Kendzior, journalist, human rights activist, and politician.
- Stepan Kovalchuk, botanist.

== “Twin towns – sister cities” ==
Moldova, Bubuieci,

Germany, Paderborn,

Poland, Tomaszów Lubelski,

Slovakia, Michalovce,
