= Kornylo Ustiyanovych =

Ukrainian painter, writer, and folklorist (1839–1903)

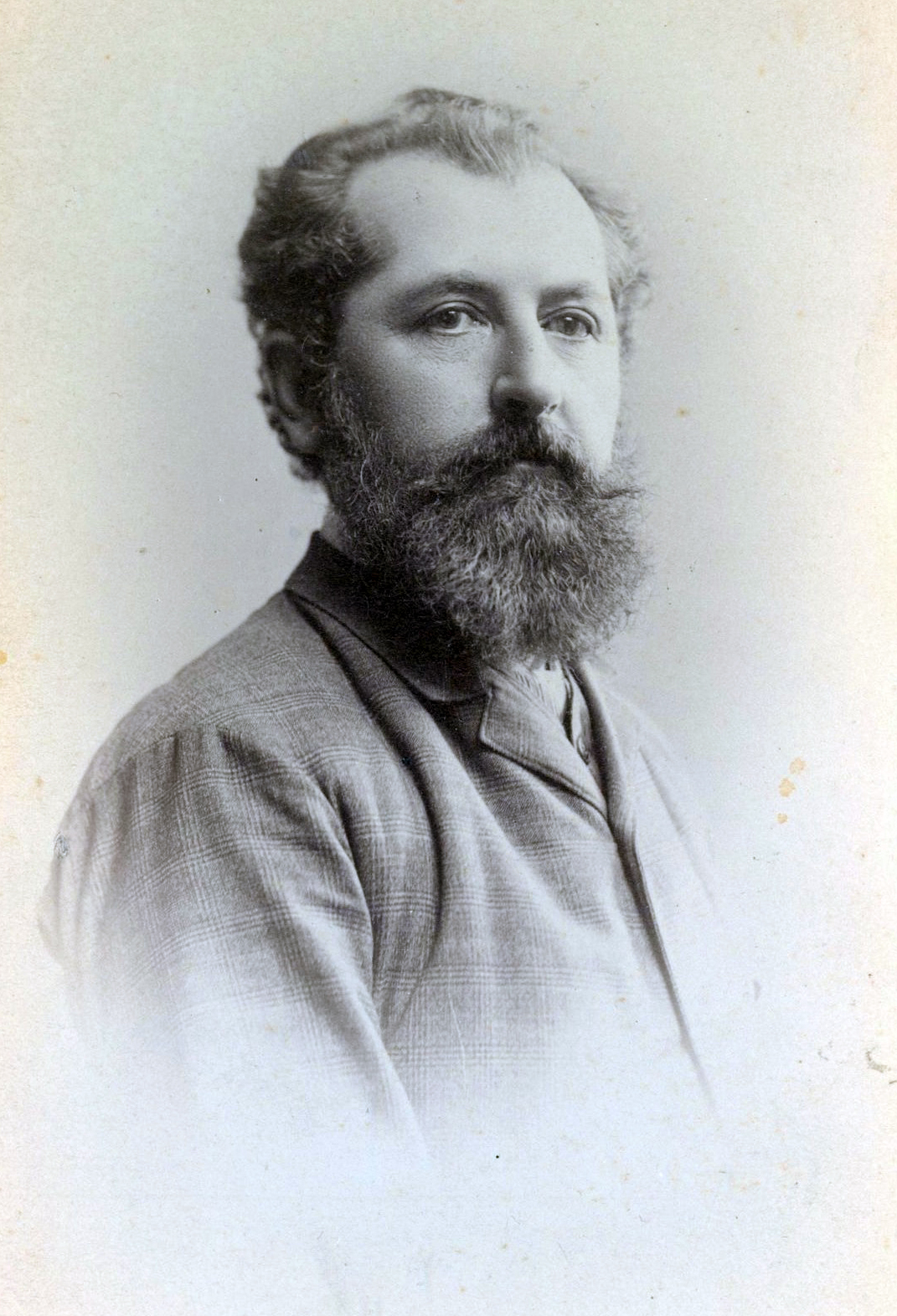
Kornylo Ustyianovych

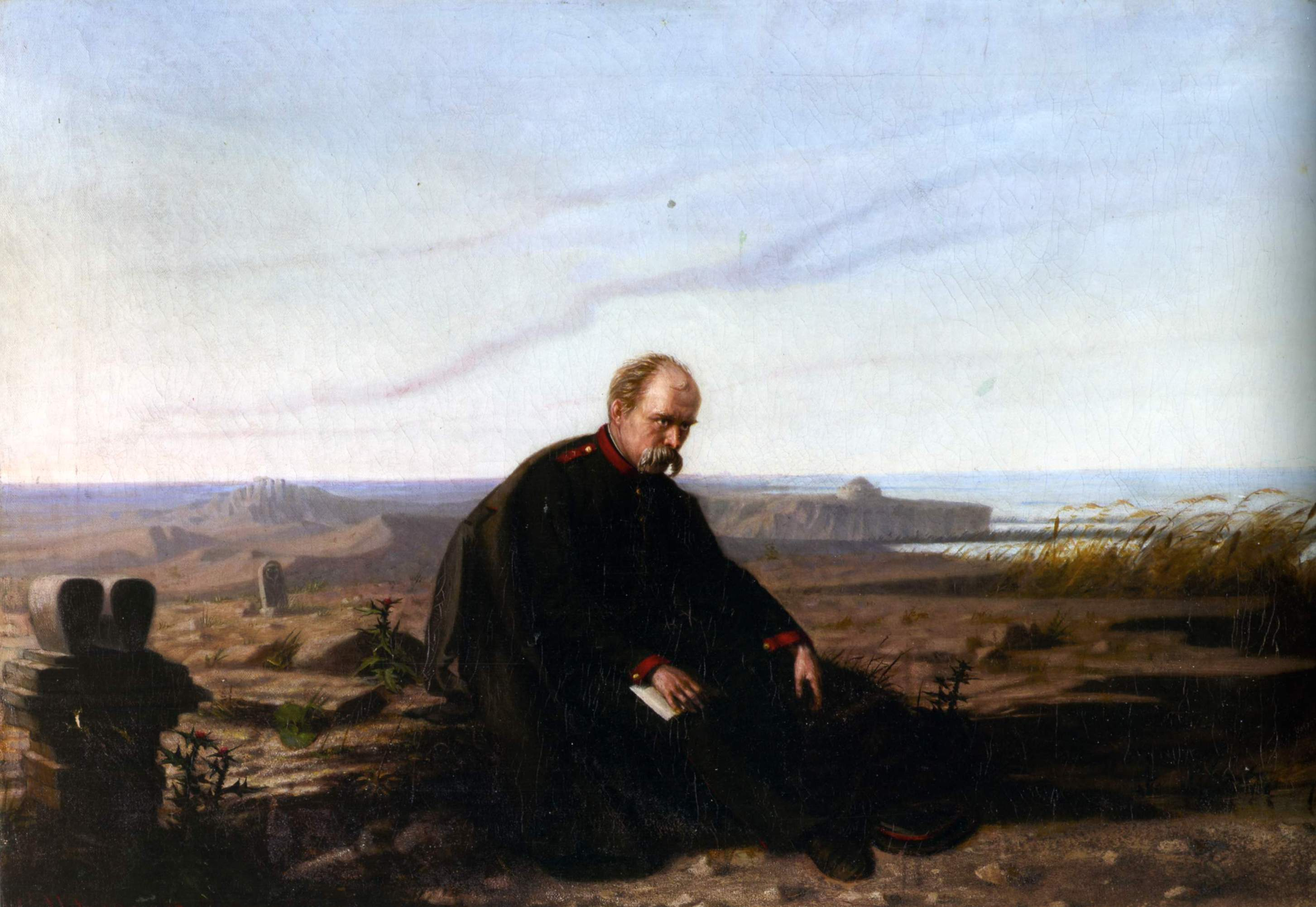
Taras Shevchenko in Exile

Kornylo Mykolaiovych Ustyianovych (Ukrainian: Корни́ло Микола́йович Устияно́вич; 22 September 1839, Vovkiv, Lviv Raion — 22 July 1903, Dovhe, Drohobych Raion) was a Ukrainian painter, writer and folklorist. His paintings are largely in the Academic style.

== Biography ==
His father Mykola, was a priest, poet and member of the Regional Diet. He began his education in Buchach, then completed it in Lviv. From 1858 to 1863, he attended the Academy of Fine Arts, Vienna, where he studied under the Polish painter, Artur Grottger. While there, he was influenced by the works of Józef Bohdan Zaleski and his political views were altered from Pan-Slavism to Ukrainian patriotism.

He published his first poems in 1861. He became one of the first members of Prosvita, a Ukrainian nationalist organization, in 1868. After 1872, he lived in Kyiv, where he began writing poems on folklore themes that were published in several journals devoted to the Ukrainian arts. He also wrote articles about the art of Galicia. From 1873 to 1874, he lived in what is now Chortkiv Raion, with the family of Volodyslav Fyodorovych, painting portraits and landscapes. His first icon was for a church in Kolomyia, which he worked on for two years. He was one of the first Ukrainian artists to portray Taras Shevchenko.

From 1882 to 1883, he edited and illustrated a satirical magazine called The Mirror. His political cartoons were praised by Ivan Franko. For a time, he worked as a scriptwriter and set designer for the Ukrainian Discourse Theatre. Over the course of his career, he created icons and murals for over fifty churches and painted approximately forty portraits.

He died in 1903, while painting an iconostasis in a small village, and was buried there.

A monument to him has been erected near his birthplace, with a sculpture by Yevhen Dzyndra. Most of his works were preserved at the Lviv National Art Gallery. In 1991, a branch of the museum devoted to his work was opened near the monument.
