= Antin Varivoda =

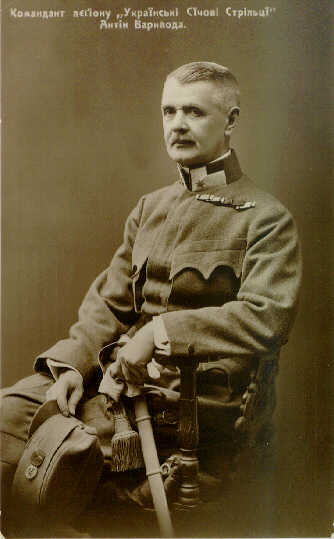
- Born: 10 January 1869; Siret, Austria-Hungary (now Romania)
- Died: 12 March 1936 (aged 67); Vienna, Austria-Hungary (now Austria)
- Military career
- Branch: USS; UGA
- Rank: Lieutenant Colonel; Colonel
- Commands: Ukrainian Sich Riflemen; Ukrainian Galician Army
- Conflicts: World War I; Polish - Ukrainian War

Antin Varivoda (Ukrainian: Анті́н Вариво́да, romanized: Antin Varyvoda) (10 January 1869 - 12 March 1936) was a Ukrainian Commander of the Legion of Ukrainian Sich Riflemen, and Colonel of the Ukrainian Galician Army.

== Biography ==
Varivoda was born in the city of Siret in Bukovina.

He graduated from the Austrian officers' school. From the beginning of the First World War he led a sotnia in the Austrian army.

From 16 March to 30 September 1916 in the rank of colonel (oberstleutnant) in the Austro-Hungarian army, the commandant of the Legion of Ukrainian Sich Riflemen.

During the Polish-Ukrainian War (1918-1919) he was Colonel in the Ukrainian Galician Army. Appointed a member of the liquidation commission, he dealt with the return of Ukrainian soldiers from Austria and Italy to their homeland. In 1920 he commanded a brigade of interned Ukrainian Galician Army soldiers in Liberec (Czechoslovakia) and Jablonne (Germany).

He lived in Vienna, where he died on 12 March 1936.
