= Solonka rural hromada =

Hromada in Lviv Oblast, Ukraine

Solonka rural hromada Солонківська сільська громада
- Hromada
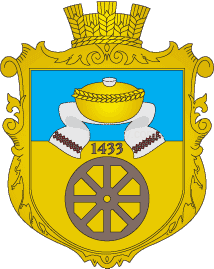
- Seal
- Interactive map of Solonka rural hromada
- Country: Ukraine
- Oblast: Lviv Oblast
- Raion: Lviv Raion
- Admin. center: Solonka

Area
  - Total: 1,861 km^{2} (719 sq mi)

Population
  - Total: 13,341
  - Density: 7.169/km^{2} (18.57/sq mi)
- CATOTTG code: UA46060410000052681
- Settlements: 21
- Villages: 21
- Website: solonkivska-gromada.gov.ua

Solonka rural hromada (Ukrainian: Солонківська сільська громада) is a hromada in Ukraine, in Lviv Raion of Lviv Oblast. The administrative center is the village of Solonka.

== Settlements ==
The hromada consists of 21 villages:

- Derevach
- Hrabnyk
- Khorosno
- Koviari
- Kuhaiv
- Lypnyky
- Malechkovychi
- Myliatychi
- Nahoriany
- Novosilka
- Pidsadky
- Pidtemne
- Porshna
- Rakovets
- Selysko
- Solonka
- Tovshchiv
- Vovkiv
- Zahiria
- Zhyrivka
- Zubra

== “International cooperation” ==
Moldova Bubuieci,

Germany, Paderborn,

Poland, Tomaszów Lubelski,

Slovakia, Michalovce,
