= Shupliak =

Shupliak (Ukrainian: Шупляк) is a gender-neutral Ukrainian surname. It may refer to

- Nina Shupliak (born 1939), Ukrainian master of folk painting
- Oleg Shupliak (born 1967), Ukrainian artist
- Vitalii Shupliak (born 1993), Ukrainian artist
