= Elena Moskaleva =

Russian painter

Elena Moskaleva (born 12 November 1957 in Krasnoarmeysk, Moscow Oblast) is a Russian visual artist specialising in optical illusions.

== Biography ==
Elena Moskaleva has studied art from early childhood: first in an art school in her hometown, and later in Moscow Academic College of Fine Art as a pupil of Matilda Bulgakova. After graduating in 1978 Elena began her work as a painter.

Elena is a member of the Moscow Artist Union from 1998 and International Federation of Artists (IFA) UNESCO.

She is a regular participant of major exhibitions in Moscow and her paintings were featured on exhibitions worldwide, most notably in Davos in the 1990.

== Work ==
Elena Moskaleva is one of the rare Russian artists working in the genre of optical illusion. Her paintings have been featured in a number of notable albums dedicated to optical illusions in fine art, along with such artists as Octavio Ocampo (Mexico), Michael Cheval (USA), Oleg Shuplyak (Ukraine) Rafal Olbinski (Poland), Liu Bolin (China), István Orosz (Hungary).

Most optical illusions are weaved into classical fine art genres such as landscapes. Critics have noted that these double images are well-hidden: "She loves producing lovely artworks that come in pastel colors. Let’s see if your eyes are sharp enough to spot the hidden portraits in this painting." The paintings are also cleverly detailed: "Elena is the kind of artist who can play well with details. This is definitely not just a simple landscape painting." Gabriel Todica notes that Elena Moskaleva draws inspiration from nature and constructs "a surreal, warm and idyllic imagery".

Elena Moskaleva's works are featured in several museums as well as in private collections of Brian Eno, Amjad Ali Khan, Eduard Sagalaev, Ted Hartley and Dina Merrill.

== Literature ==
- Exhibition "Country Native" Publisher: M .: "Soviet Artist", 1978. 208 pp.
- "Youth of the country". Exhibition of the Moscow Union of Artists. "Manezh", Moscow. 1982
- "Women-artists of Moscow: The Way in Art". Editor: M. Esmont. Publishing house: Moscow "Decorative art" 2005. ISBN 5-98179-022-9
- Kalinin Anatoly. "The Vision of Mystery." Mysterious paintings in the past and present. (Encyclopaedia of optical illusions) Moscow, "Kuchkovo Field", 2011
- "Optische Illusionen". Brad Honeycutt, Terry Stickels, Foreword by Scott Kim. Bassermann, Germany 2012. ISBN 3809430277
- "Infinitely unequal world." Moscow. “Science and Religion” Magazine No.3 2015. (The cover of the magazine, a gallery of paintings and an article about the artist).
- The Art of Deception: Illusions to Challenge the Eye and the Mind. by Brad Honeycutt Publisher: “Imagine” (USA) 2014. ISBN 1623540372.
- Koten kara saishinsaku made hyakukyuitten (Japanese) by Rei Kitagawa. Publisher: Osaka: Sogensha, 2015. ISBN 4422700960
- Gabriel Todica & Gina-Maria Todica, "Duoscopic vision painters". "Lidana" Publisher, (Romanian Edition), Suceava. Romania, 2015. ISBN 978-606-744-020-1
- Gabriel Todica & Gina-Maria Todica, "Duoscopic vision painters", English on-line edition (URL: http://en.calameo.com/read/001926384559dfb5a8b04) Romania, 2017. ISBN 978-973-0-24736-7
- Gabriel Todica & Gina-Maria Todica, "Duoscopic art. The universal interferences". By Gabriel Todica. Suceava. "Lidana" Publisher. Romania, 2017. ISBN 978-606-744-059-1
- The Art of Optical Illusions: Deceptions to Challenge the Eye and the Mind by Terry Stickels (Author), Brad Honeycutt (Author), Scott Kim (Foreword) Imagine Publisher USA ISBN 1623540933
