= Saint Nicholas Church, Nadrichne =

Church in Ternopil Oblast, Ukraine

Saint Nicholas Church
- Церква Святого Миколая
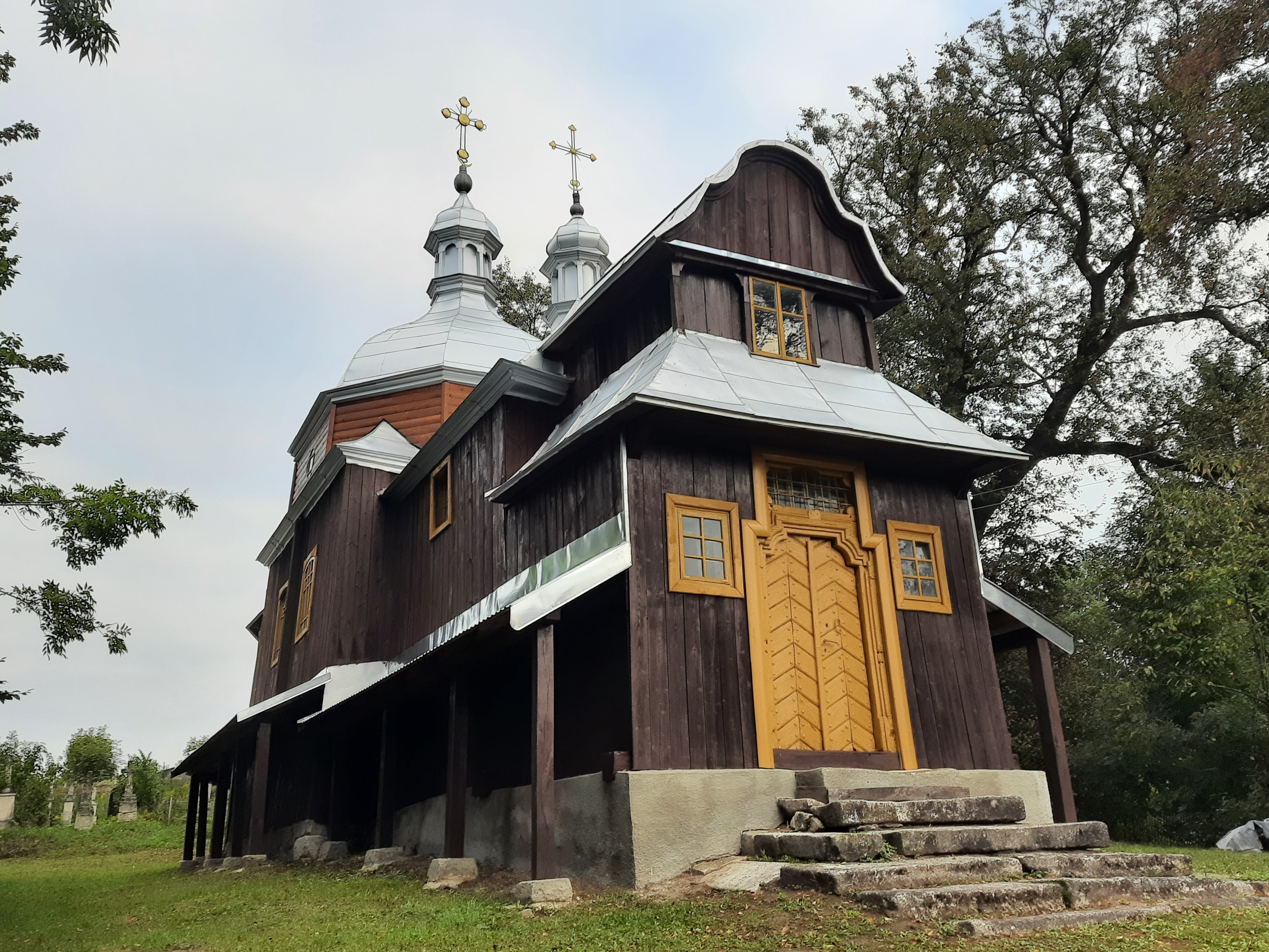

- Location within Ternopil Oblast

Religion
- Affiliation: Ukrainian Greek Catholic Church

Location
- Location: Nadrichne, Berezhany urban hromada, Ternopil Raion, Ternopil Oblast, Ukraine
- Coordinates: 49°32′16″N 24°57′18″E

Architecture
- Completed: 1771

Saint Nicholas Church (Ukrainian: Церква Святого Миколая) is a Greek Catholic parish wooden church (UGCC) in Nadrichne of the Berezhany urban hromada, Ternopil Raion, Ternopil Oblast.

== History ==
The wooden church was built in 1771. In the 18th century, the church, which was located on the territory of the Basilian monastery from Rohatyn, was moved to Nadrichne. During 1964–1989 the church was forcibly closed by the Soviet authorities.

To this day, the four-tiered iconostasis and the vicarious icon of the Transfiguration of the Christ have been preserved in the shrine. Restoration work was carried out in 2021–2023.

The parish belonged to the Berezhany ([1832–1906]) and Pomoriany ([1907–1944]) deaneries.

Number of parishioners: 1832 – 503, 1844 – 481, 1854 – 431, 1864 – 487, 1874 – 496, 1884 – 519, 1894 – 530, 1904 – 712, 1914 – 804, 1924 – 806, 1936 – 783.

== Priests ==
- Ivan Shpytko ([1832]–1855)
- Mykola Styslovskyi (1856–1857, administrator, 1857–1875)
- Omelian Viadytyn (1875–1877, administrator, 1877–1879+)
- Ilarii Shushkovskyi (1879–1880, administrator)
- Martyn Pakizh (1880–1883)
- Roman Kryzhanovskyi (1883–1884, administrator)
- Omelian Petrovych (1584–1886)
- Leontii Luzhnytskyi (1886–1901)
- Pavlo Dudyk (1901–1906)
- Mykola Myhlodovych (1906–1907, administrator)
- Omelian Havrysho (1907–1932+)
- Pavlo Shvydkyi (1932, assistant)
- Stefan Horodetskyi (1933–[1944])
