= Nina Shupliak =

Ukrainian master of folk painting (born 1939)

- Ніна Дмитрівна Шупляк
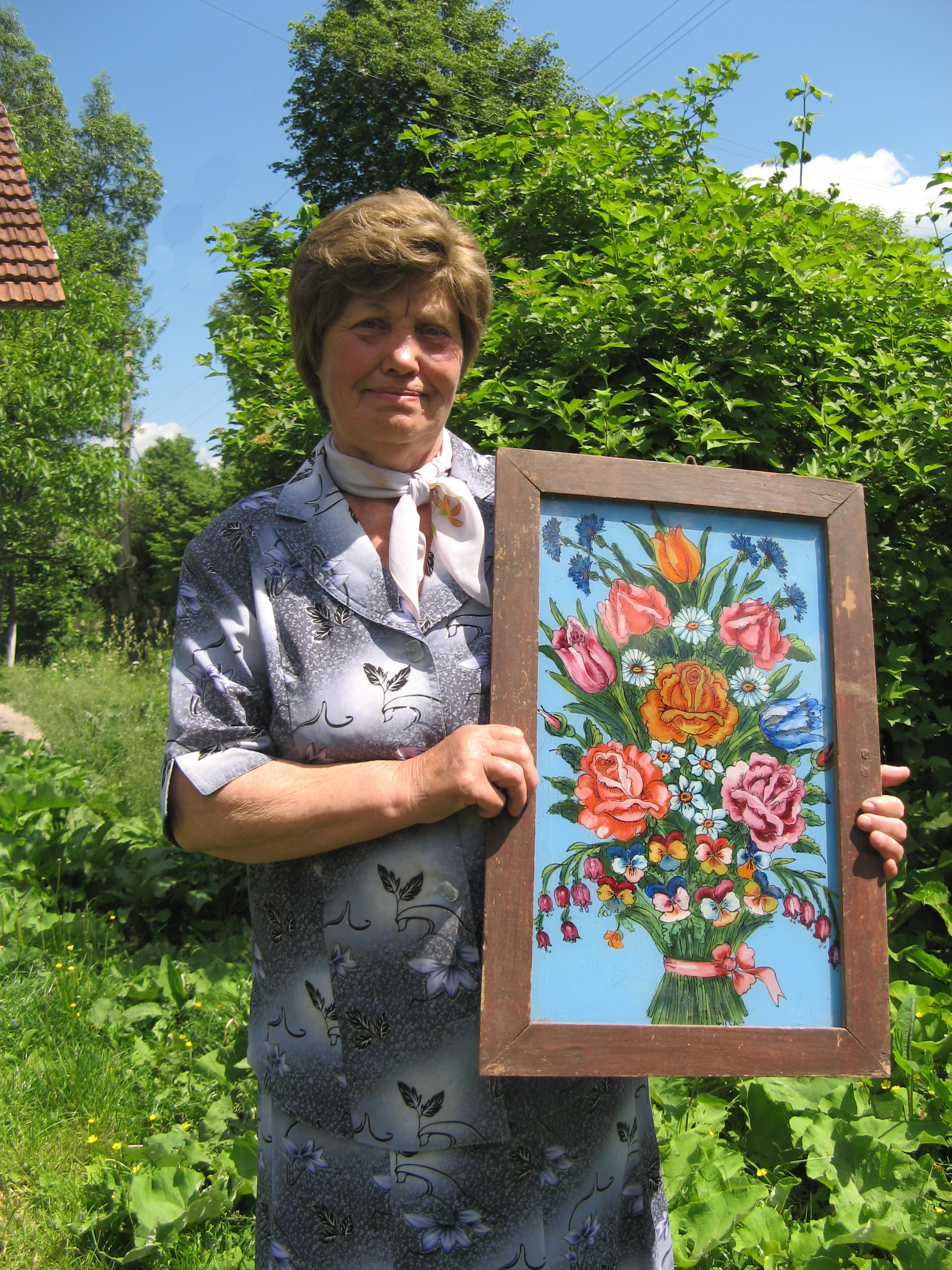
- Nina Shupliak with her painting on glass "Buket" (1960s) in the village of Bishche of Ternopil Raion
- Born: 4 January 1939 (age 87); Rakhny-Poliovi, Vinnytsia Oblast (now Ukraine)
- Education: Zalishchyky Agricultural Tekhnikum, Ternopil Pedagogical Institute
- Occupation: Master of folk painting

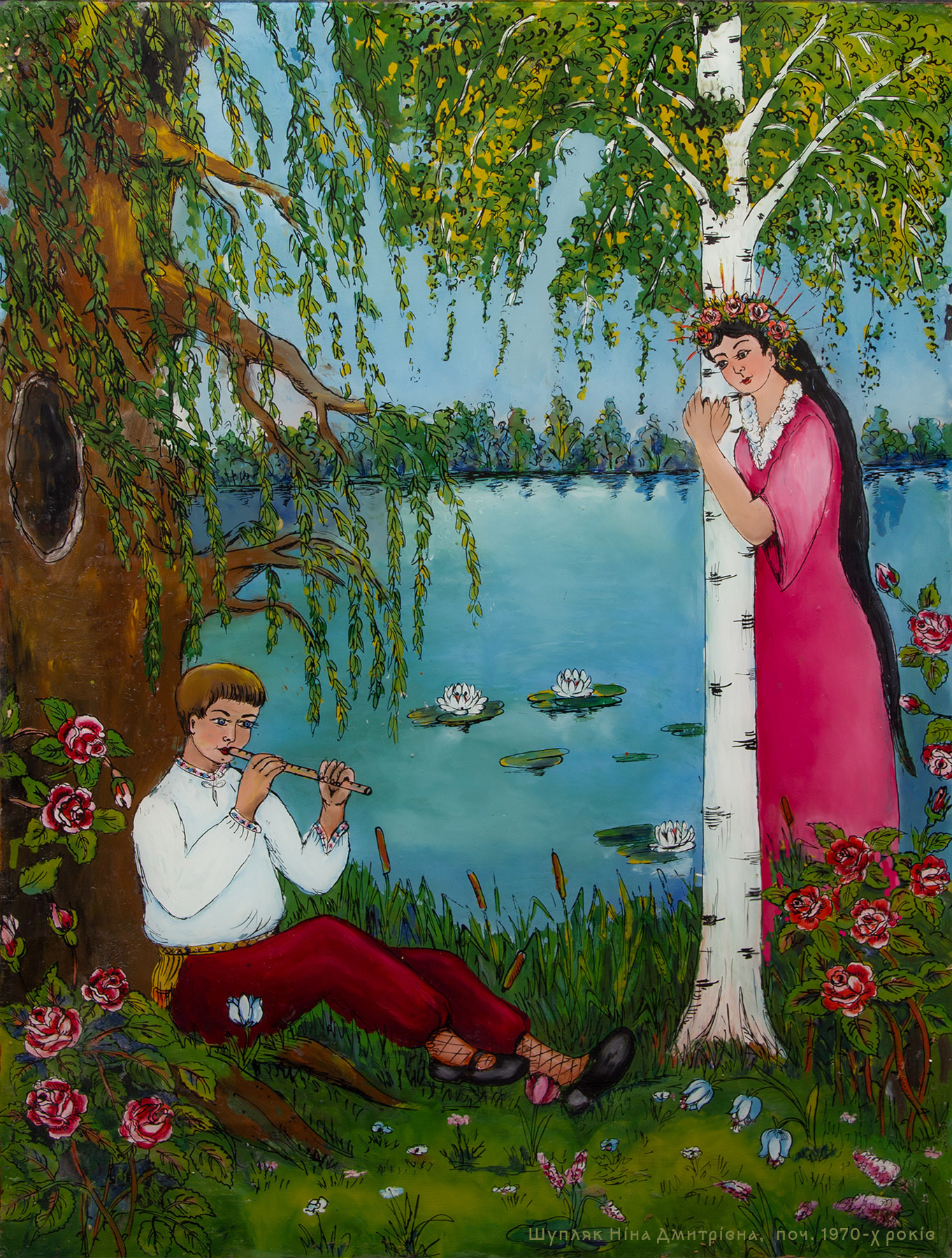
Painting by Nina Shupliak "Forest Song" (early 1970s).

Nina Shupliak (Ukrainian: Ніна Дмитрівна Шупляк; born 4 January 1939) is a Ukrainian master of folk painting. Mother of Oleg Shupliak and grandmother of Vitalii Shupliak.

== Biography ==
Nina Shupliak was born on 4 January 1939 in the village of Rakhny-Poliovi of Tyvriv Raion of Vinnytsia Oblast (now Tyvriv Hromada of Vinnytsia Raion of Vinnytsia oblast of Ukraine).

In 1959, she graduated from the Zalishchyky Agricultural Tekhnikum, and in 1978 from the Ternopil Pedagogical Institute. She lives in the village of Bishche (now Ternopil Raion), where she worked as an agronomist, a teacher of fine arts and biology, a head teacher and a principal of a local school.

== Creativity ==
At the age of 13–14, she started painting on glass. The artist mastered this technique on her own. During the 1960s and 1980s, her works were in almost every house in the villages of Bishche, Poruchyn, and Urman in the Ternopil Raion. Some of them remained in Vinnytsia Oblast.

He works in the style of naïve art (1950s–1970s) and author's folk painting (1980s–2020s). This can be traced in the subject matter of everyday life, portraits, still lifes, landscapes, icons and religious paintings. Her works are characterized by vibrant colors and a harmonious combination of numerous shades of pure, saturated hues.

Major works:

- "Divchata z vinochkamy", "Vedmedyky" (1959);
- "Divchyna z olenem" (early 1960s);
- "Buket", "Troiandy" (1961–1963);
- "Portret T. Shevchenka" (1960s, 1970s);
- "Lisova pisnia" (1970s);
- "Yikhav kozak na viinonku" (1970s),
- "Portret I. Franka", "Teche voda iz-za haiu...", "Sadok vyshnevyi kolo khaty...", "Kozak vidizhdzhaie, a divchyna plache..." (1970s-1980s);
- "Rizdvo Khrystove", "Sviata Rodyna" (2007–2008) and others.

In September 2017, the Berezhany Museum of Local Lore; opened an exhibition by Nina Shupliak entitled "Maliarstvo na skli".

In July 2026, four works by Nina Shupliak were featured in the exhibition "Nashi" at the Zenyk Art Gallery in Lviv. The exhibition brought together 207 works by 27 Ukrainian folk artists, including Maria Prymachenko, Paraska Plytka-Horytsvit, and Nikifor.

In August 2026, the Lviv Art Library hosted the opening of her solo exhibition, "U kvituchomu sadu".
