= Komarivka =

Komarivka (Ukrainian: Комарівка) may refer to several places in Ukraine:

== Cherkasy Oblast ==
- Komarivka, Korsun-Shevchenkivskyi Raion, village in Korsun-Shevchenkivskyi Raion
- Komarivka, Zolotonosha Raion, village in Zolotonosha Raion

== Chernihiv Oblast ==
- Komarivka, Nizhyn Raion, Chernihiv Oblast, village in Nizhyn Raion
- Komarivka, Pryluky Raion, Chernihiv Oblast, village in Pryluky Raion
- Komarivka, Koriukivka Raion, Chernihiv Oblast, village in Koriukivka Raion
- Komarivka, Chernihiv Raion, Chernihiv Oblast, village in Chernihiv Raion

== Crimea ==
- Komarivka, Crimea, village in Krasnohvardiiske Raion

== Kharkiv Oblast ==
- Komarivka, Izium Raion, village in Izium Raion
- Komarivka, Krasnokutsk Raion, village in Krasnokutsk Raion

== Khmelnytskyi Oblast ==
- Komarivka, Khmelnytskyi Oblast, village in Slavuta Raion

== Kyiv Oblast ==
- Komarivka, Kyiv Oblast, village in Makariv Raion

== Lviv Oblast ==
- Komarivka, Lviv Oblast, village in Brody Raion

== Odesa Oblast ==
- Komarivka, Liubashivka Raion, village in Liubashivka Raion
- Komarivka, Velyka Mykhailivka Raion, village in Velyka Mykhailivka Raion

== Poltava Oblast ==
- Komarivka, Poltava Oblast, village in Kobeliaky Raion

== Rivne Oblast ==
- Komarivka, Dubno Raion, village in Dubno Raion
- Komarivka, Kostopil Raion, village in Kostopil Raion

== Sumy Oblast ==
- Komarivka, Hlukhiv Raion, village in Hulukhiv Raion
- Komarivka, Okhtyrka Raion, village in Okhtyrka Raion

== Ternopil Oblast ==
- Komarivka, Berezhany Raion, village in Berezhany Raion
- Komarivka, Kremenets Raion, village in Kremenets Raion
- Komarivka, Monastyryska Raion, village in Monastyryska Raion

== Vinnytsia Oblast ==
- Komarivka, Vinnytsia Oblast, village in Teplyk Raion

== Zhytomyr Oblast ==
- Komarivka, Zhytomyr Oblast, village in Khoroshiv Raion

== See also ==
- Komarówka (disambiguation)
