= Posukhiv =

Rural locality in Ternopil Oblast, Ukraine

Posukhiv Посухів
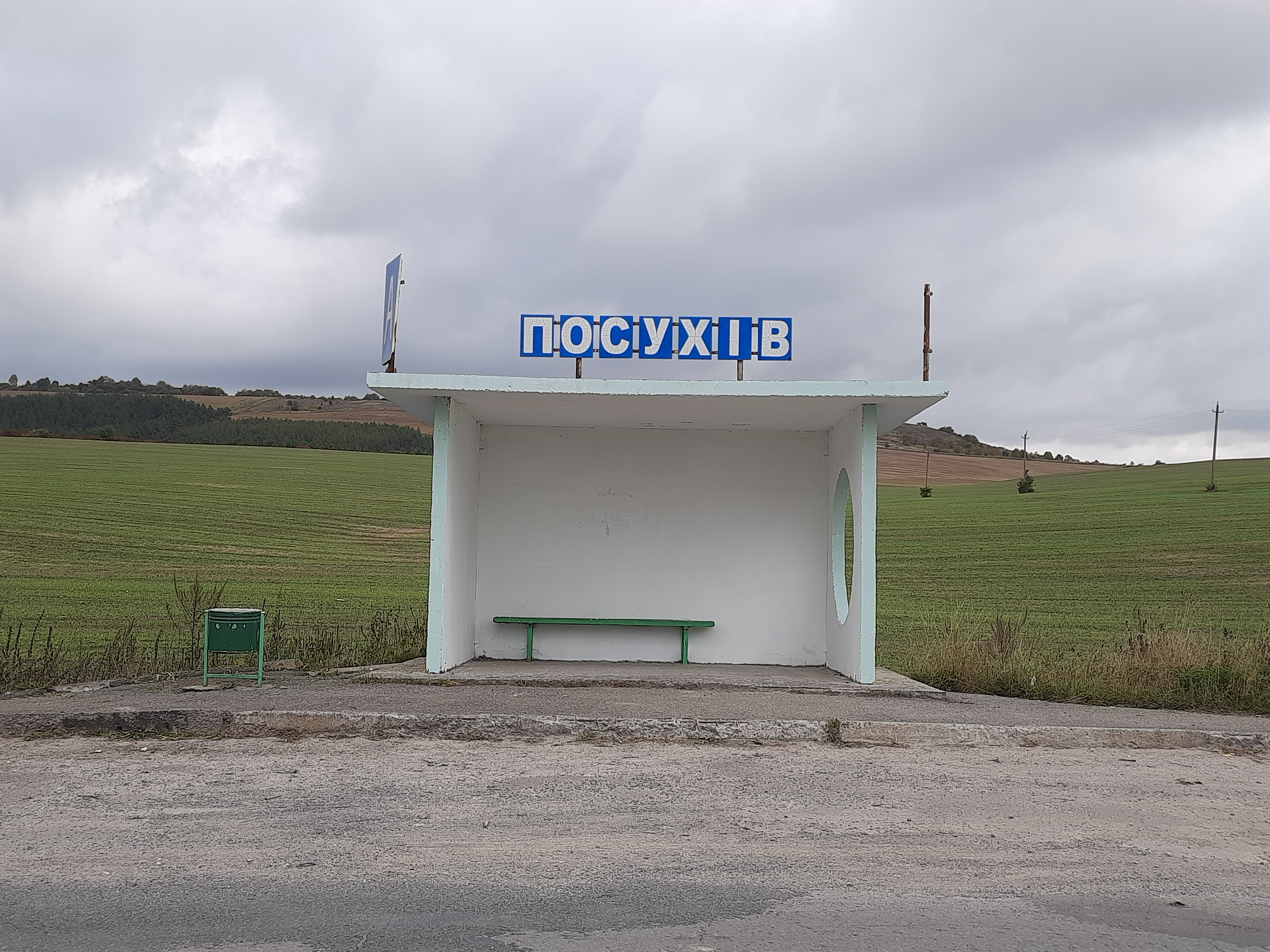
- Bus stop in Posukhiv

- Location in Ternopil Oblast
- Coordinates: 49°24′35″N 24°57′9″E
- Country: Ukraine
- Oblast: Ternopil Oblast
- Raion: Ternopil Raion
- Hromada: Berezhany urban hromada
- Time zone: UTC+2 (EET)
  - Summer (DST): UTC+3 (EEST)
- Postal code: 47546

Posukhiv (Ukrainian: Посухів) is a village in Berezhany urban hromada, Ternopil Raion, Ternopil Oblast, Ukraine.

== History ==
The first written mention of the village was in 1438.

After the liquidation of the Berezhany Raion on 19 July 2020, the village became part of the Ternopil Raion.

== Religion ==
- Two churches of St. Michael (1928, brick, OCU; 2010, brick, UGCC).

== Sources ==
- (in Ukrainian) Жак О., Кулик Л., Посухів // Ternopil Encyclopedic Dictionary: in 4 v. / editorial board: H. Yavorskyi and other, Ternopil: "Zbruch", 2008, V. 3: П—Я, S. 122-123. — ISBN 978-966-528-279-2.
- "Posuchów, wś, pow. brzeżański". Geographical Dictionary of the Kingdom of Poland (in Polish). 8. Warszawa: Kasa im. Józefa Mianowskiego. 1887. p. 852.
