= Yasne, Ternopil Oblast =

Rural locality in Ternopil Oblast, Ukraine

Yasne Ясне
- Location in Ternopil Oblast
- Coordinates: 49°28′40″N 25°4′28″E
- Country: Ukraine
- Oblast: Ternopil Oblast
- Raion: Ternopil Raion
- Hromada: Berezhany urban hromada
- Time zone: UTC+2 (EET)
  - Summer (DST): UTC+3 (EEST)
- Postal code: 47516

Yasne (Ukrainian: Ясне) is a village in Berezhany urban hromada, Ternopil Raion, Ternopil Oblast, Ukraine.

== History ==
The village was formed as a result of the unification of Haiok and Senkiv khutirs (1954).

After the liquidation of the Berezhany Raion on 19 July 2020, the village became part of the Ternopil Raion.

== Sources ==
- (in Ukrainian) Ковальков Ю., Ясне // Ternopil Encyclopedic Dictionary: in 4 v. / editorial board: H. Yavorskyi and other, Ternopil: "Zbruch", 2008, V. 3: П—Я, S. 695. — ISBN 978-966-528-279-2.
