= Komarówka =

Komarówka may refer to the following places in Poland:

- Komarówka, Lublin Voivodeship
- Komarówka, Pomeranian Voivodeship
- Komarówka Podlaska

== See also ==
- Komarivka
