= Zaluzhzhia, Berezhany urban hromada, Ternopil Raion, Ternopil Oblast =

Rural locality in Ternopil Oblast, Ukraine

Zaluzhzhia Залужжя
- Location in Ternopil Oblast
- Coordinates: 49°34′29″N 24°54′27″E
- Country: Ukraine
- Oblast: Ternopil Oblast
- Raion: Ternopil Raion
- Hromada: Berezhany urban hromada
- Time zone: UTC+2 (EET)
  - Summer (DST): UTC+3 (EEST)
- Postal code: 47512

Zaluzhzhia (Ukrainian: Залужжя) is a village in Berezhany urban hromada, Ternopil Raion, Ternopil Oblast, Ukraine.

== History ==
In the 13th century, the people who then settled behind the meadow formed Zaluzhzhia.

After the liquidation of the Berezhany Raion on 19 July 2020, the village became part of the Ternopil Raion.

== Religion ==
- Saints Peter and Paul church (2002).

== Sources ==
- (in Ukrainian) Лашта В., Шупляк Г., Залужжя // Ternopil Encyclopedic Dictionary: in 4 v. / editorial board: H. Yavorskyi and other, Ternopil: "Zbruch", 2004, V. 1: А—Й, S. 612—613. — ISBN 966-528-197-6.
