= Church of the Assumption, Bishche =

Ukrainian church in Bishche, Ukraine

Church of the Assumption
- Костел Внебовзяття Пресвятої Діви Марії
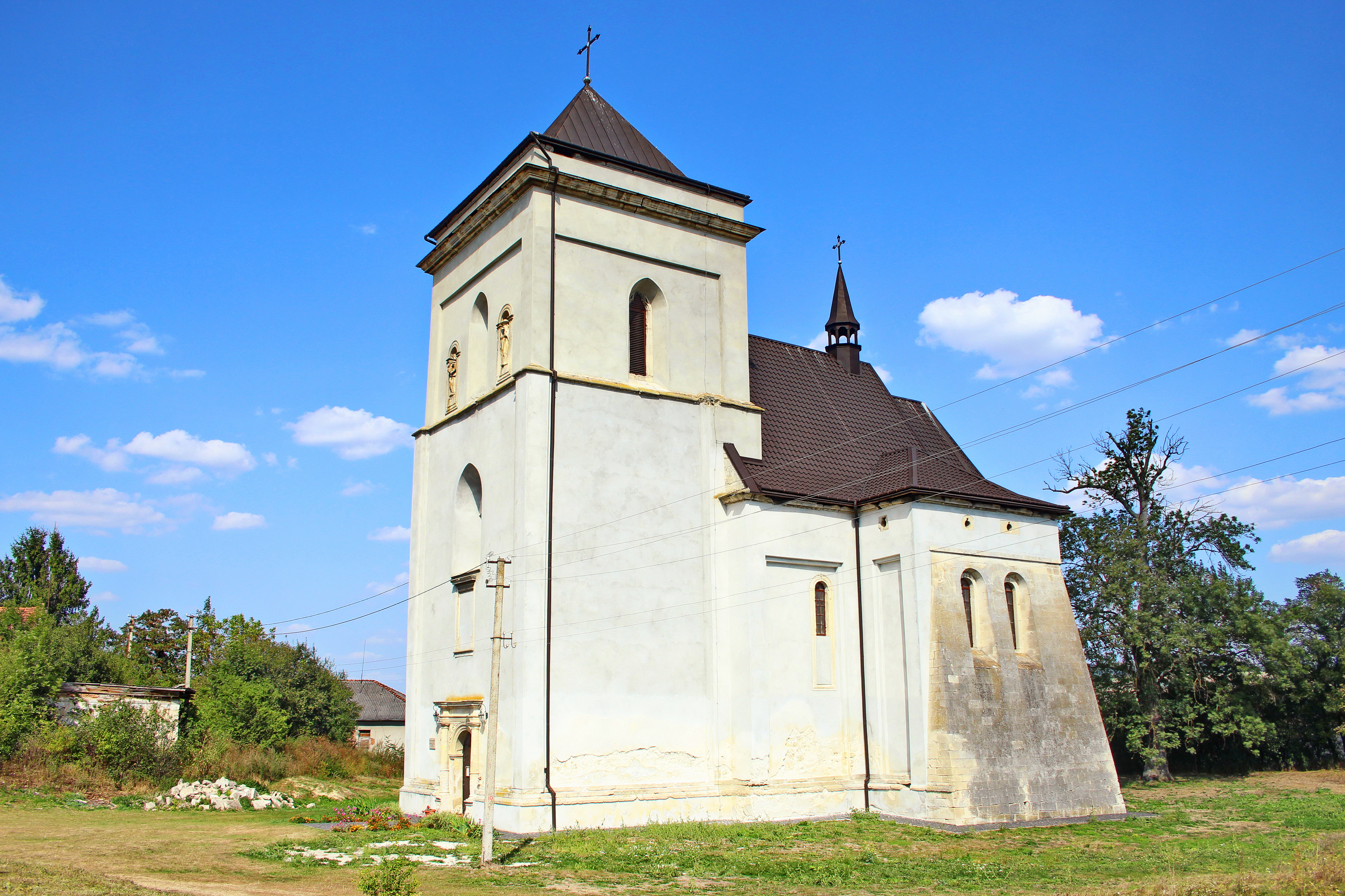
- The church in 2025

- Location within Ternopil Oblast

Religion
- Affiliation: Roman Catholic church

Location
- Location: Bishche
- Coordinates: 49.553383°N 24.897619°E

Architecture
- Completed: 1624–1638

Immovable Monument of National Significance of Ukraine
- Official name: Костел (мур.) (Church (stone))
- Type: Architecture
- Reference no.: 190037

Church of the Assumption (Ukrainian: Костел Внебовзяття Пресвятої Діви Марії) is a historic Roman Catholic church, architectural monument of national significance, a fortified parish church in the former town of Bishche (now a village in the Ternopil Raion of the Ternopil Oblast in Ukraine). In the past, the church housed the famous Icon of the Virgin Mary of Bishche.

== History ==
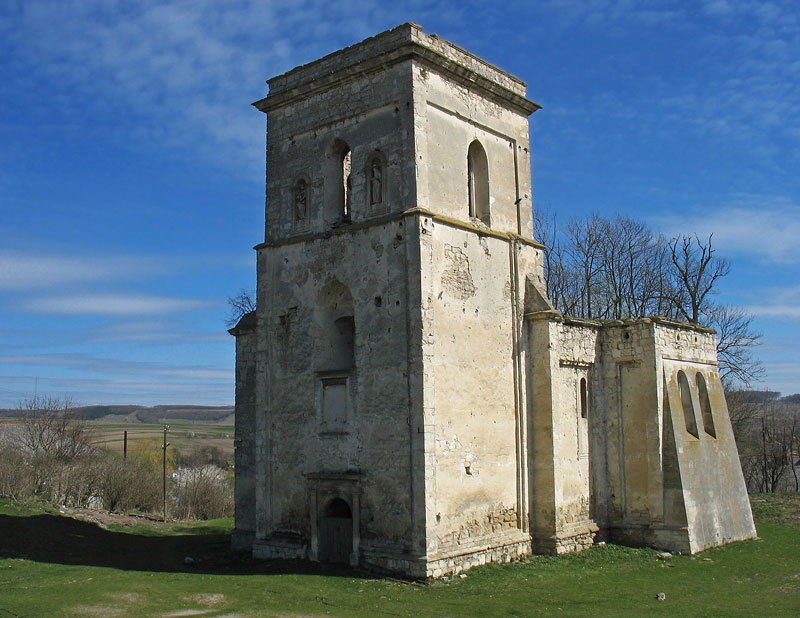
View before restoration

The construction of the church lasted from 1624 to 1638. During the Tatar invasion of 1674, the temple was captured and burned down by the invaders. The damaged church was rebuilt at the beginning of the 18th century, with the walls additionally reinforced with stone buttresses. During the renovation of the temple in the second half of the 19th century, the defensive walls and towers were demolished.

In 1944, the last local parish priest Filip Zając, was forced to leave the village. During World War II, the temple was significantly damaged. For some time, the church was used as a fertilizer warehouse, and then it stood empty, falling into ruin.

After the fall of Soviet rule, the church was cleaned up. In 2009, the parish priest of Church of Nativity of Virgin Mary in Berezhany, priest Andrii Reminets, undertook the renovation of the ruined temple. In June 2014, in order to stop the destruction of the church, the renovation of the roof began. On 26 July 2015, a copy of the miraculous Icon of the Virgin Mary from the main altar, saved in 1944 by German officer Georg Franc and located in Racławice Śląskie, was to arrive in Bishche.

On Sunday, 26 July 2015, at 4 p.m., Leon Malyi, auxiliary bishop of the Archdiocese of Lviv, together with priests and many people, consecrated copies of the images during Holy Mass.

The sculptural furnishings of the church were created by Jan Pfister.

Between 2014 and 2018, new plasterwork, woodwork, the main altar, sculptures, other furnishings, etc. were added outside the roof.

== Bibliography ==
- Józef Czernecki: Brzeżany: pamiątki i wspomnienia. Lwów, nakładem Towarzystwa nauczycieli szkół wyższych, 1905, s. 93–96.
- ks. Sebastjan Smigielski. Kościół i twierdza w Buszczu. [W:] Lwowianin, s. 59-61.
- Matka Boska Buszczecka. Historia przybycia do Racławic Śląskich obrazu Matki Boskiej Buszczeckiej, 6 s.
