= Andrii Nakonechnyi =

Ukrainian painter (1905–1983)

Mykhailo Moroz
- Михайло Ілліч Мороз
- Born: 31 May 1905; Urman, Austria-Hungary (now Ukraine)
- Died: 15 September 1983 (aged 78); Ternopil
- Occupation: Painter

Andrii Nakonechnyi (Ukrainian: Андрій Михайлович Наконечний; 31 May 1905 – 15 September 1983) was a Ukrainian painter.

In 1929–1933, he was a member of the Zarevo group, and in 1941–1944, he was a member of the Union of Ukrainian Fine Artists.

== Biography ==
Andrii Nakonechnyi was born on 31 May 1905 in Urman, Ternopil Oblast.

In 1926–1928 he served in the Polish Army. He worked on the creation of scenery for theatrical performances. In 1933, he graduated from the private schools of Professors Hoffmann and A. Terletskyi at the Kraków Academy of Arts.

In 1930–1931, under the guidance of Demian Horniatkevych, he participated in the painting of the Church of the Ascension in Nastasiv, Ternopil Raion.

In 1938–1939, Nakonechnyi was commissioned by Andrei Sheptytskyi to work on copies of the frescoes of the Chapel of the Holy Cross at Wawel Castle in Kraków.

In 1941, he returned to Lviv, where he was a deputy propaganda officer for the government of the Ukrainian State Government. On June 30, 1941, in the Lviv building of the Prosvita Society, during the proclamation of the Act of restoration of the Ukrainian state, he raised the national flag on the tower of the Kniazha Hora. In Yaroslav Stetsko's government, he worked on issues of culture and art, and developed samples of the Organization of Ukrainian Nationalists' military insignia. He escaped arrest by the Gestapo. In his native village, he worked in a quarry and forestry; later, in 1954, he became a painter for the Berezhany Road Service.

In 1958, he moved to Ternopil. It is known that in the 1960s Nakonechnyi painted skillfully. In 1973, Nakonechnyi was sparred. He was persecuted by the German and Soviet authorities.

He died on 15 September 1983 in Ternopil. He was buried in Berezhany.

== Creativity ==
In 1935, he began participating in exhibitions. After the artist's death, his works were presented individually at solo exhibitions in Ternopil (1991, 2005), Berezhany (1991, 1994) and Lviv (2000).

He worked in the fields of easel painting (portraits, landscapes) and monumental painting (icons, church paintings).

Among his main works:

- "Dereviana tserkva", "Tserkva u Vorokhti", "Rizdvo", "Kvitucha yablunia" (all from the 1930s.), "Avtoportret" (1931; 1943), series "Kraievydy s. Urman" (1936–1943), "Tserkva u Dubivtsiakh", "Yevanheliie" (both – 1939), "Druzhyna Yevheniia" (1942; 1944), "Voskresinnia" (1943), "Seret nyzhche stavu" (1961), "Z ridnoho Urmania", "Ternopil", "Kozak na mohyli", "Yevanheliie" (all — 1973–1983);
- icons — "Rizdvo Khrystove" (1938), "Khrystos", "Sv. Olha", "Madonna", "Khrest Isusa Khrysta", "Sv. Olha ta Volodymyr", "Bozha Maty — zastupnytsia Sobornoi Ukrainy" (all — 1939), "Sv. Mykolai" (1943), "Pokrova", "Bozha Maty" (both — 1944), "Voznesinnia", "Khreshchennia", "Blahovishchennia" (all — 1973–1983).
