= Baranivka, Ternopil Oblast =

Rural locality in Ternopil Oblast, Ukraine

Baranivka Баранівка
- Location within Ukraine
- Coordinates: 49.471°N 24.998°E
- Country: Ukraine
- Oblast: Ternopil Oblast
- Raion: Ternopil Raion

Population (2001 census)
  - Total: ▼216 (2,014)
- Time zone: UTC+2 (EET)
  - Summer (DST): UTC+3 (EEST)
- Postal code: 47516
- Area code: +380 3548

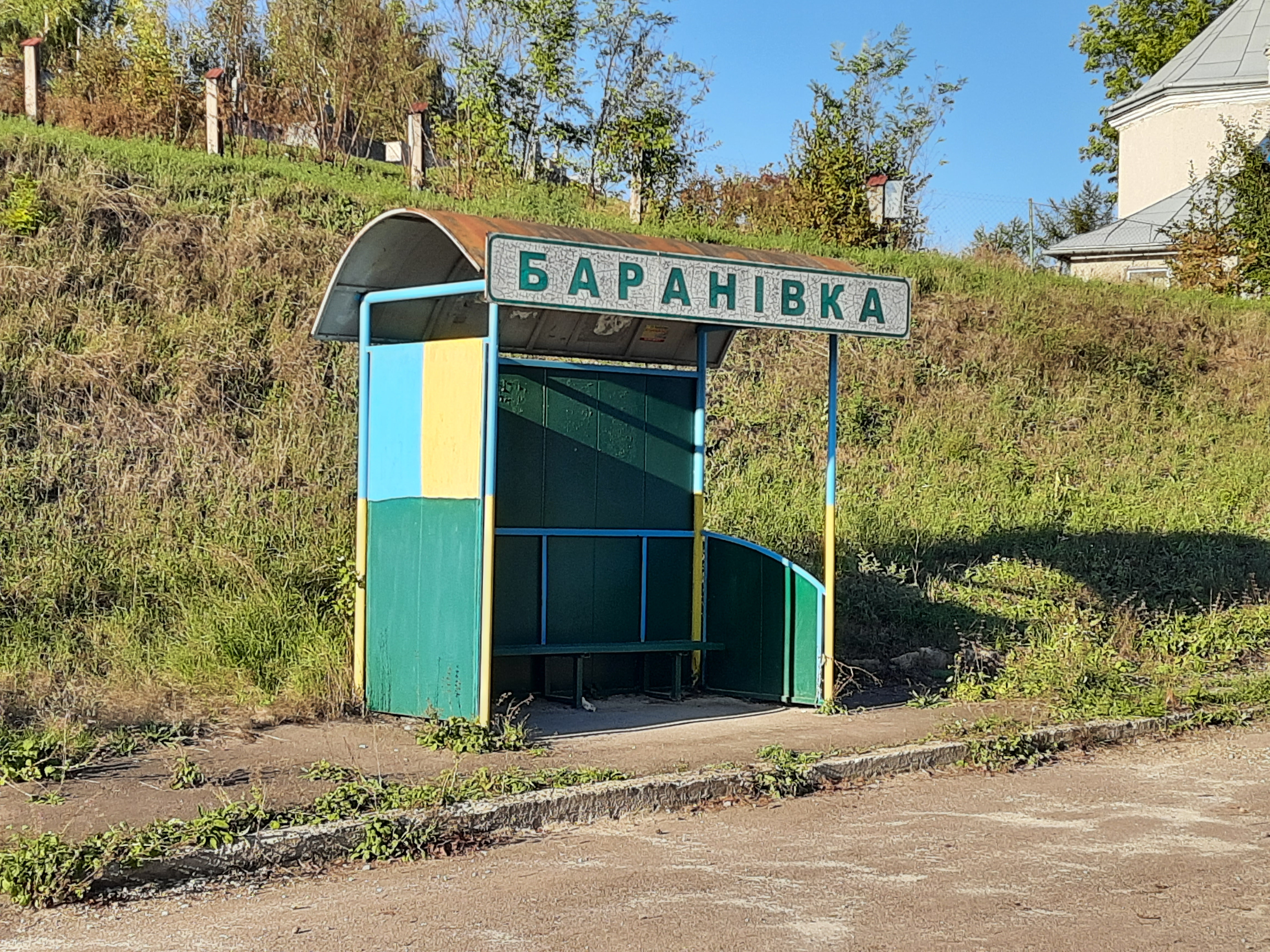
Baranivka village, Ternopil district, Ternopil region

Baranivka (Ukrainian: Баранівка) is a village in Ternopil Raion of Ternopil Oblast, Ukraine. It belongs to Berezhany urban hromada, one of the hromadas of Ukraine.

Until 18 July 2020, Baranivka belonged to Berezhany Raion. The raion was abolished in July 2020 as part of the administrative reform of Ukraine, which reduced the number of raions of Ternopil Oblast to three. The area of Berezhany Raion was merged into Ternopil Raion.

== Population ==
- Population in 2014: 216.
