= Rakhny-Polovi =

Rural locality in Vinnytsia Oblast, Ukraine

Rakhny-Polovi Рахни-Польові
- Village
- Location in Vinnytsia Oblast Rakhny-Polovi (Ukraine)
- Coordinates: 48°54′39″N 28°31′3″E
- Country: Ukraine
- Oblast: Vinnytsia Oblast
- Raion: Vinnytsia Raion
- Hromada: Tyvriv settlement hromada
- Time zone: UTC+2 (EET)
  - Summer (DST): UTC+3 (EEST)
- Postal code: 23352

Rakhny-Polovi (Ukrainian: Рахни-Польові) is a village in the Tyvriv settlement hromada of the Vinnytsia Raion of Vinnytsia Oblast in Ukraine.

== History ==
The first written mention of the village was in 1790.

On 19 July 2020, as a result of the administrative-territorial reform and liquidation of the Tyvriv Raion, the village became part of the Vinnytsia Raion.

== Notable residents ==
- Nina Shupliak (born 1939), Ukrainian master of folk painting
