= Krasnopushcha =

Rural locality in Ternopil Oblast, Ukraine

Krasnopushcha Краснопуща
- Location in Ternopil Oblast
- Coordinates: 49°36′22″N 24°56′26″E
- Country: Ukraine
- Oblast: Ternopil Oblast
- Raion: Ternopil Raion

Population (2001)
  - Total: 191
- Time zone: UTC+2 (EET)
  - Summer (DST): UTC+3 (EEST)
- Postal code: 47510
- Area code: +380 3548

Krasnopushcha (Ukrainian: Краснопуща) is a village in Ternopil Raion, Ternopil Oblast, Ukraine. It belongs to Berezhany urban hromada, one of the hromadas of Ukraine.

Until 18 July 2020, Krasnopushcha belonged to Berezhany Raion. The raion was abolished in July 2020 as part of the administrative reform of Ukraine, which reduced the number of raions of Ternopil Oblast to three. The area of Berezhany Raion was merged into Ternopil Raion.

== Population ==
- Population in 2001: 191 inhabitants with over 40 houses.

== Gallery ==
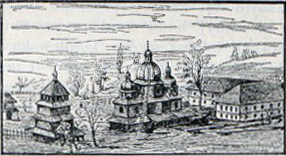
Basilian monastery in Krasnopushcha, ХІХ

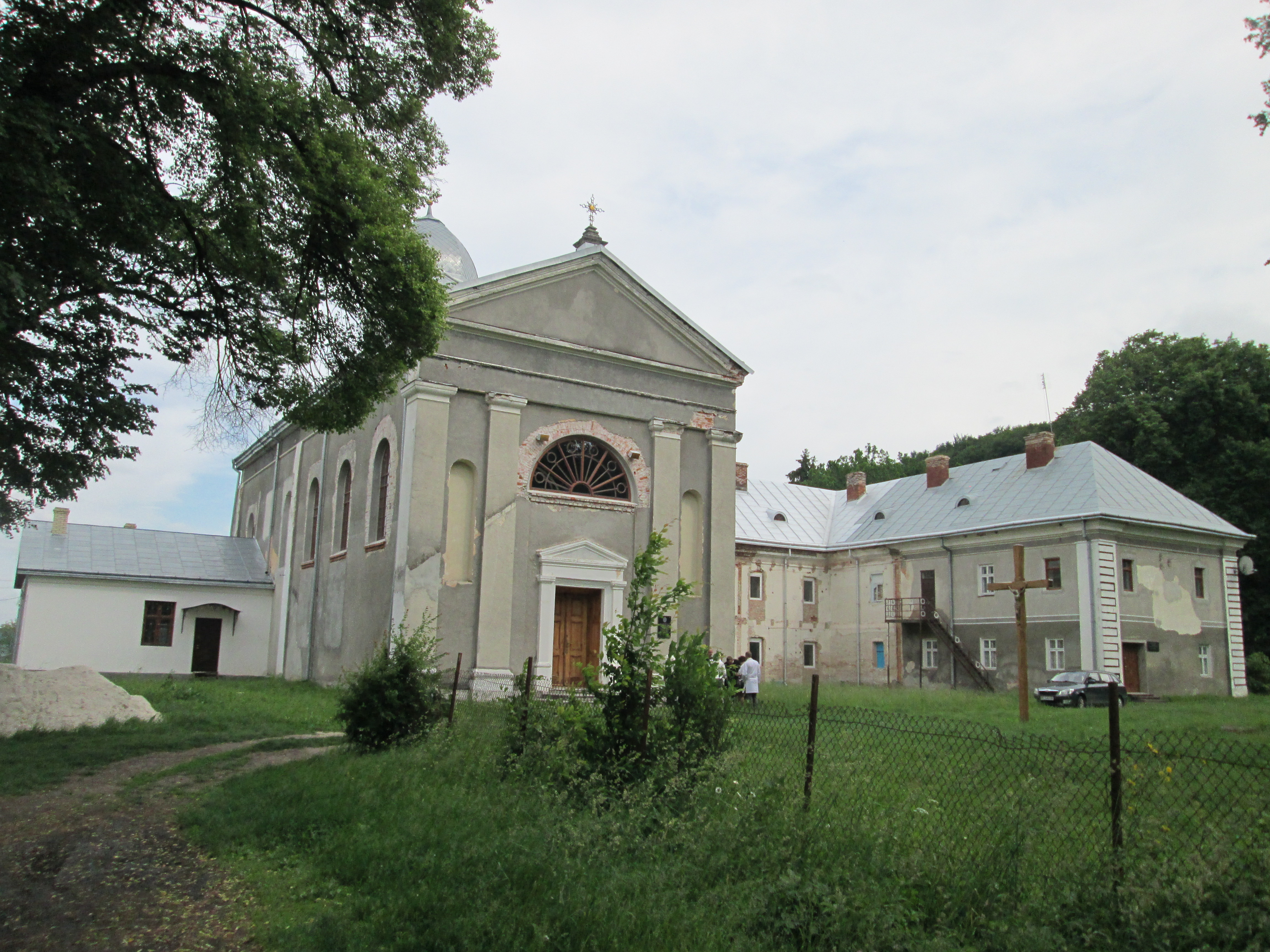
Basilian monastery, 2016

== Sources ==
- (in Ukrainian) М. Мищишин, Я. Павлів, С. Тиманський, Краснопуща // Ternopil Encyclopedic Dictionary: in 4 v. / editorial board: H. Yavorskyi and other, Ternopil: "Zbruch", 2005, V. 2: К—О, S. 219-220. — ISBN 966-528-199-2.
