= Pidlisne, Ternopil Raion, Ternopil Oblast =

Rural locality in Ternopil Oblast, Ukraine

Pidlisne Підлісне
- Location in Ternopil Oblast
- Coordinates: 49°31′14″N 24°55′25″E
- Country: Ukraine
- Oblast: Ternopil Oblast
- Raion: Ternopil Raion
- Hromada: Berezhany urban hromada
- Time zone: UTC+2 (EET)
  - Summer (DST): UTC+3 (EEST)
- Postal code: 47515

Pidlisne (Ukrainian: Підлісне) is a village in Berezhany urban hromada, Ternopil Raion, Ternopil Oblast, Ukraine.

== History ==
The first written mention of the village was in 1773.

After the liquidation of the Berezhany Raion on 19 July 2020, the village became part of the Ternopil Raion.

== Religion ==
- Two churches of the Nativity of the Blessed Virgin Mary (1999, OCU; 1932, UGCC).

== Sources ==
- (in Ukrainian) Бич В., Підлісне // Ternopil Encyclopedic Dictionary: in 4 v. / editorial board: H. Yavorskyi and other, Ternopil: "Zbruch", 2008, V. 3: П—Я, S. 83. — ISBN 978-966-528-279-2.
- (in Polish) "Szumlany (1)". Geographical Dictionary of the Kingdom of Poland (in Polish). 12. Warszawa: Kasa im. Józefa Mianowskiego. 1892. p. 74–75.
