= Nadrichne, Berezhany urban hromada, Ternopil Raion, Ternopil Oblast =

Nadrichne Надрічне
- Village
- Location within Ternopil Oblast
- Coordinates: 49°32′08″N 24°57′23″E
- Country: Ukraine
- Oblast: Ternopil Oblast
- District: Ternopil Raion
- Hromada: Berezhany urban hromada
- Established: 1420

Area
  - Total: 1.3 km^{2} (0.50 sq mi)
- Elevation: 282 m (925 ft)

Population (2022)
  - Total: ▼704
- Time zone: UTC+2 (EET)
  - Summer (DST): UTC+3 (EEST)
- Postal code: 48022
- Area code: +380 3548

Nadrichne (Ukrainian: Надрічне) is a village in Ternopil Raion of Ternopil Oblast. It belongs to Berezhany urban hromada, one of the hromadas of Ukraine.

Until 18 July 2020, Nadrichne belonged to Berezhany Raion. The raion was abolished in July 2020 as part of the administrative reform of Ukraine, which reduced the number of raions of Ternopil Oblast to three. The area of Berezhany Raion was merged into Ternopil Raion.

The village has the Saint Nicholas church (1771, wooden, transported from Rohatyn, now Ivano-Frankivsk Oblast) and the Church of the Holy Martyr Josaphat, opened in 2000.
