= Rai, Ternopil Oblast =

Rural locality in Ternopil Oblast, Ukraine

Rai Рай
- Location in Ternopil Oblast
- Coordinates: 49°25′50″N 24°54′34″E
- Country: Ukraine
- Oblast: Ternopil Oblast
- Raion: Ternopil Raion
- Hromada: Berezhany urban hromada
- Time zone: UTC+2 (EET)
  - Summer (DST): UTC+3 (EEST)
- Postal code: 47506

Rai (Ukrainian: Рай) is a village in Berezhany urban hromada, Ternopil Raion, Ternopil Oblast, Ukraine.

The village has a park and a palace.

== History ==
It has been known from 1540 as the hunting chambers of the nobleman A. Syniavskyi.

After the liquidation of the Berezhany Raion on 19 July 2020, the village became part of the Ternopil Raion.

== Religion ==
- Church of the Intercession (1878, brick, UGCC),
- Monastery of the Blessed Martyr Mykola Charnetskyi (UGCC).

== Sources ==
- (in Ukrainian) Хаварівський Б., Рай // Ternopil Encyclopedic Dictionary: in 4 v. / editorial board: H. Yavorskyi and other, Ternopil: "Zbruch", 2008, V. 3: П—Я, S. 167. — ISBN 978-966-528-279-2.
- "Raj". Geographical Dictionary of the Kingdom of Poland (in Polish). 9. Warszawa: Kasa im. Józefa Mianowskiego. 1888. p. 492.
