= Zhovnivka =

Rural locality in Ternopil Oblast, Ukraine

Zhovnivka Жовнівка
- Location in Ternopil Oblast
- Coordinates: 49°24′22″N 25°0′34″E
- Country: Ukraine
- Oblast: Ternopil Oblast
- Raion: Ternopil Raion
- Hromada: Berezhany urban hromada
- Time zone: UTC+2 (EET)
  - Summer (DST): UTC+3 (EEST)
- Postal code: 47524

Zhovnivka (Ukrainian: Жовнівка) is a village in Berezhany urban hromada, Ternopil Raion, Ternopil Oblast, Ukraine.

== History ==
The first written mention of the village was in 1453.

After the liquidation of the Berezhany Raion on 19 July 2020, the village became part of the Ternopil Raion.

== Religion ==
- Church of the Intercession (1992).

== Sources ==
- (in Ukrainian) Кулик Л., Лашта В., Жовнівка // Ternopil Encyclopedic Dictionary: in 4 v. / editorial board: H. Yavorskyi and other, Ternopil: "Zbruch", 2004, V. 1: А—Й, S. 579. — ISBN 966-528-197-6.
- "Żółnówka". Geographical Dictionary of the Kingdom of Poland (in Polish). 14. Warszawa: Kasa im. Józefa Mianowskiego. 1895. p. 824.
