= Krasnopushcha Monastery =

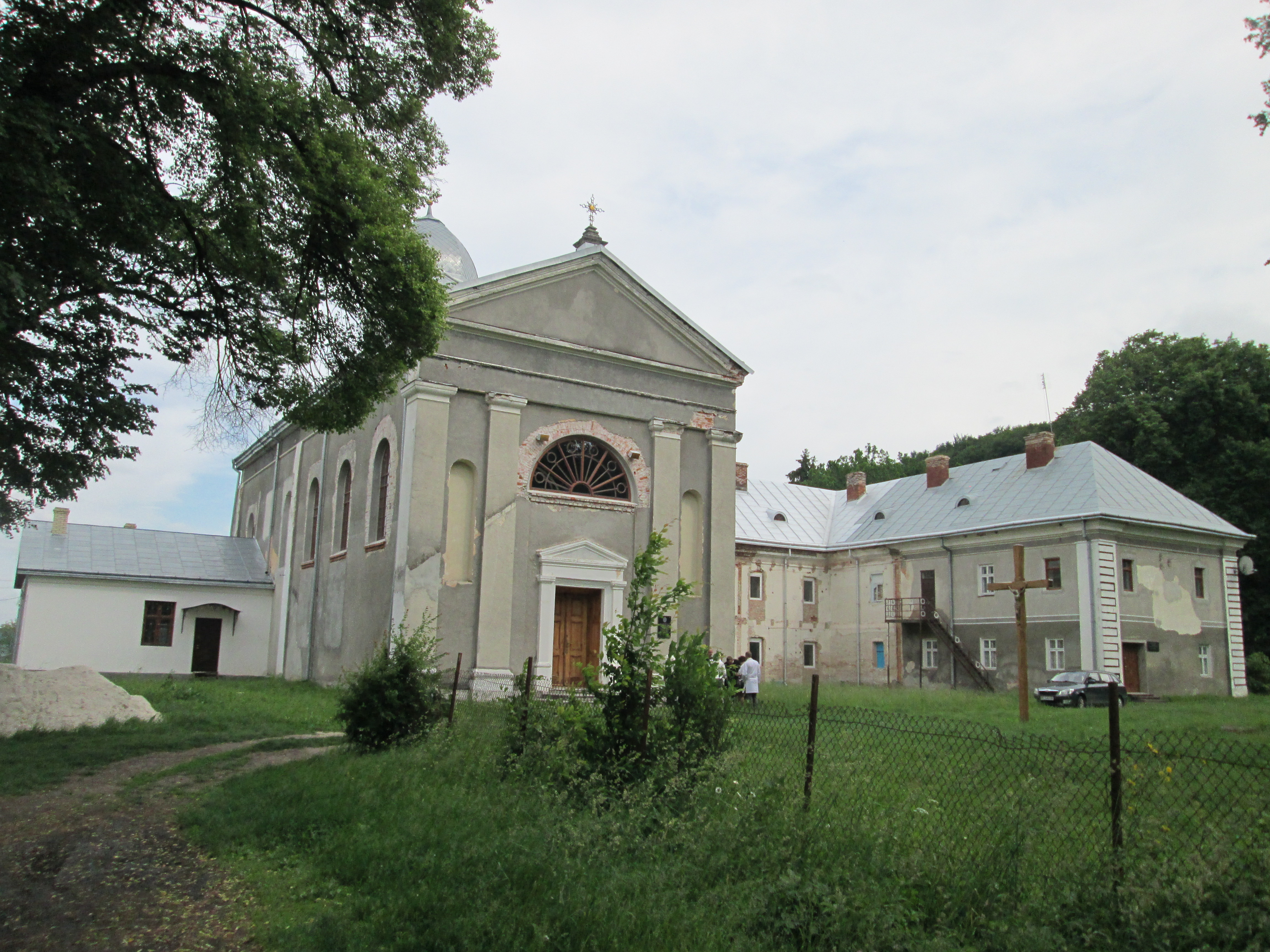
Krasnopushcha Monastery

Krasnopushcha Monastery of the Nativity of St. John the Baptist (Ukrainian: Краснопущанський монастир) of the Order of St. Basil the Great is an active religious, cultural, and educational center in Krasnopushcha, Ternopil Oblast.

== History ==
The monastery was founded in 1644 by monks Varlaam and Theodosius with the blessing of Bishop Atanasii Zhelyborskyi. The main founder was Crown Standard-Bearer (later King) John III Sobieski, who granted the monastery considerable estates.

Initially, the monastery had a wooden church, which was replaced in 1906 by a stone church dedicated to the Nativity of St. John the Baptist. The complex also included a two-story stone building, erected in 1786–1797. The temple housed a miraculous icon of the Blessed Virgin Mary, and in 1912, an iconostasis from the early 18th century was purchased for it.

The monastery played an educational and cultural role: it was home to the Prosvita cultural association, Ukrainian language classes for priests were held there, and its visitors included Ivan Franko (1894), Bohdan Lepky, and Andrii Chaikovskyi.

The monastery was liquidated by the Soviet authorities in 1946, and from 1979 its premises were occupied by a psychoneurological boarding school.

Today, the monastery is an active religious institution of the Ukrainian Greek Catholic Church (UGCC). Its revival began in 1990, when part of the premises were returned to the Basilians. Services in the restored church resumed in 1992 under the leadership of the current abbot, priest S. Romanik (UGCC).

== Hegumens ==
- H. Buinitskyi (1735–1750)
- Y. Skotynskyi (1786–1797)
- Anastasii Didytskyi (c. 1809–1811)
- Hlykerii Dubytskyi (1811–1813)
- Yeremiia Lomnytskyi (1900–1901)
- Pavlo Pushkarskyi (1926–1931)
- Pakhomii Borys (1931–1934)
- Yosyp Halabarda (1934–1937)
- Y. Manko
- S. Romanyk (from 2008)

Among the monks is Dydyk Sozont.
