= Bishche =

Rural locality in Ternopil Oblast, Ukraine

Bishche Біще
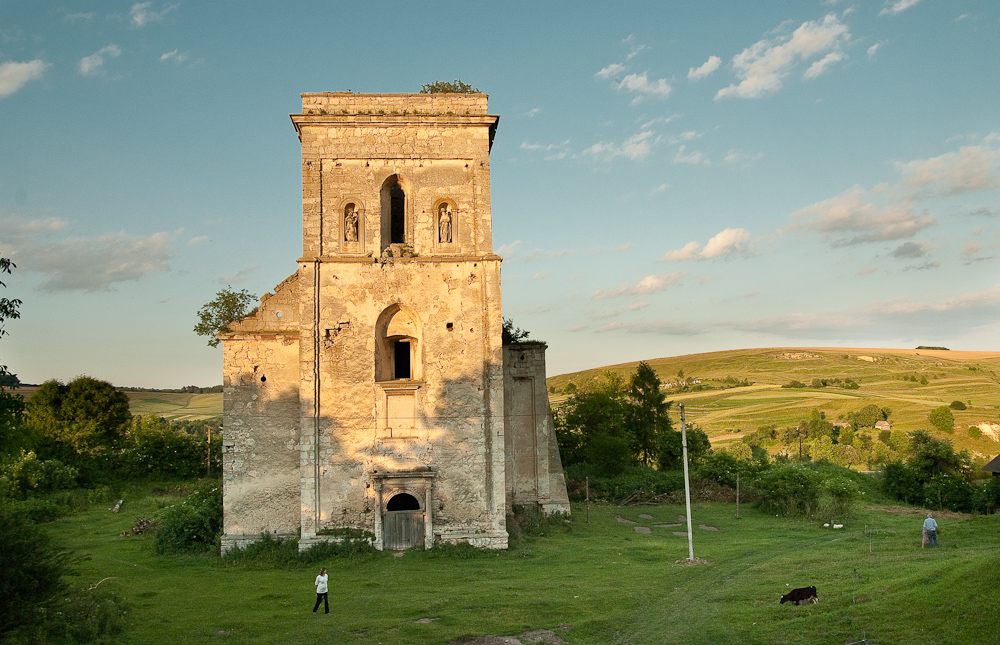
- Fortified Church of the Assumption in Bishche

- Location within Ukraine
- Coordinates: 49°33′01″N 24°54′19″E
- Country: Ukraine
- Oblast: Ternopil Oblast
- Raion: Ternopil Raion
- Time zone: UTC+2 (EET)
  - Summer (DST): UTC+3 (EEST)
- Postal code: 47512
- Area code: +380 3548

Bishche (Ukrainian: Біще, Polish: Buszcze) is a village in Ternopil Raion, Ternopil Oblast of western Ukraine. It belongs to Berezhany urban hromada, one of the hromadas of Ukraine. First historical records date Bishche as far as to 1339.

Until 18 July 2020, Bishche belonged to Berezhany Raion. The raion was abolished in July 2020 as part of the administrative reform of Ukraine, which reduced the number of raions of Ternopil Oblast to three. The area of Berezhany Raion was merged into Ternopil Raion.

== Population ==
- Population in 1900: 869 inhabitants (66 Jews).
- Population in 1939: 1059 inhabitants (40 Jews).
- Population in 2003: 556 inhabitants with over 161 houses.
- Population in 2014: 464.

== Religion ==
- Church of the Assumption (17th century)
- Saints Borys and Hlib church (1927, wooden, 1989 – restored; 1996, stone)

== Notable residents ==
- Nina Shupliak (born 1939), Ukrainian master of folk painting
- Oleh Shupliak (born 1967), Ukrainian artist
