= Poruchyn =

Rural locality in Ternopil Oblast, Ukraine

Poruchyn Поручин
- Location in Ternopil Oblast Poruchyn (Ukraine)
- Coordinates: 49°33′45″N 24°54′51″E
- Country: Ukraine
- Oblast: Ternopil Oblast
- Raion: Ternopil Raion
- Hromada: Berezhany urban hromada
- Time zone: UTC+2 (EET)
  - Summer (DST): UTC+3 (EEST)
- Postal code: 47545

Poruchyn (Ukrainian: Поручин) is a village in Berezhany urban hromada, Ternopil Raion, Ternopil Oblast, Ukraine.

== History ==
The first written mention of the village was in 1341.

After the liquidation of the Berezhany Raion on 19 July 2020, the village became part of the Ternopil Raion.

== Religion ==
- Saint Paraskeva church (1338, completed in wood and brick).

== Monuments ==
- Room-museum of the Lepkyi family.

== Sources ==
- (in Ukrainian) Гуцал П., Шупляк Г., Поручин // Ternopil Encyclopedic Dictionary: in 4 v. / editorial board: H. Yavorskyi and other, Ternopil: "Zbruch", 2008, V. 3: П—Я, S. 121. — ISBN 978-966-528-279-2.
