= Komarivka, Ternopil Raion, Ternopil Oblast =

Rural locality in Ternopil Oblast, Ukraine

Komarivka Комарівка
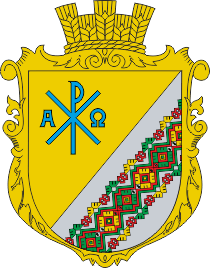
- Coat of arms

- Location in Ternopil Oblast
- Coordinates: 49°26′32″N 25°03′27″E
- Country: Ukraine
- Oblast: Ternopil Oblast
- Raion: Ternopil Raion

Area
  - Total: 350 km^{2} (140 sq mi)

Population (2001)
  - Total: 220
- Time zone: UTC+2 (EET)
  - Summer (DST): UTC+3 (EEST)
- Postal code: 47521
- Area code: +380 3548

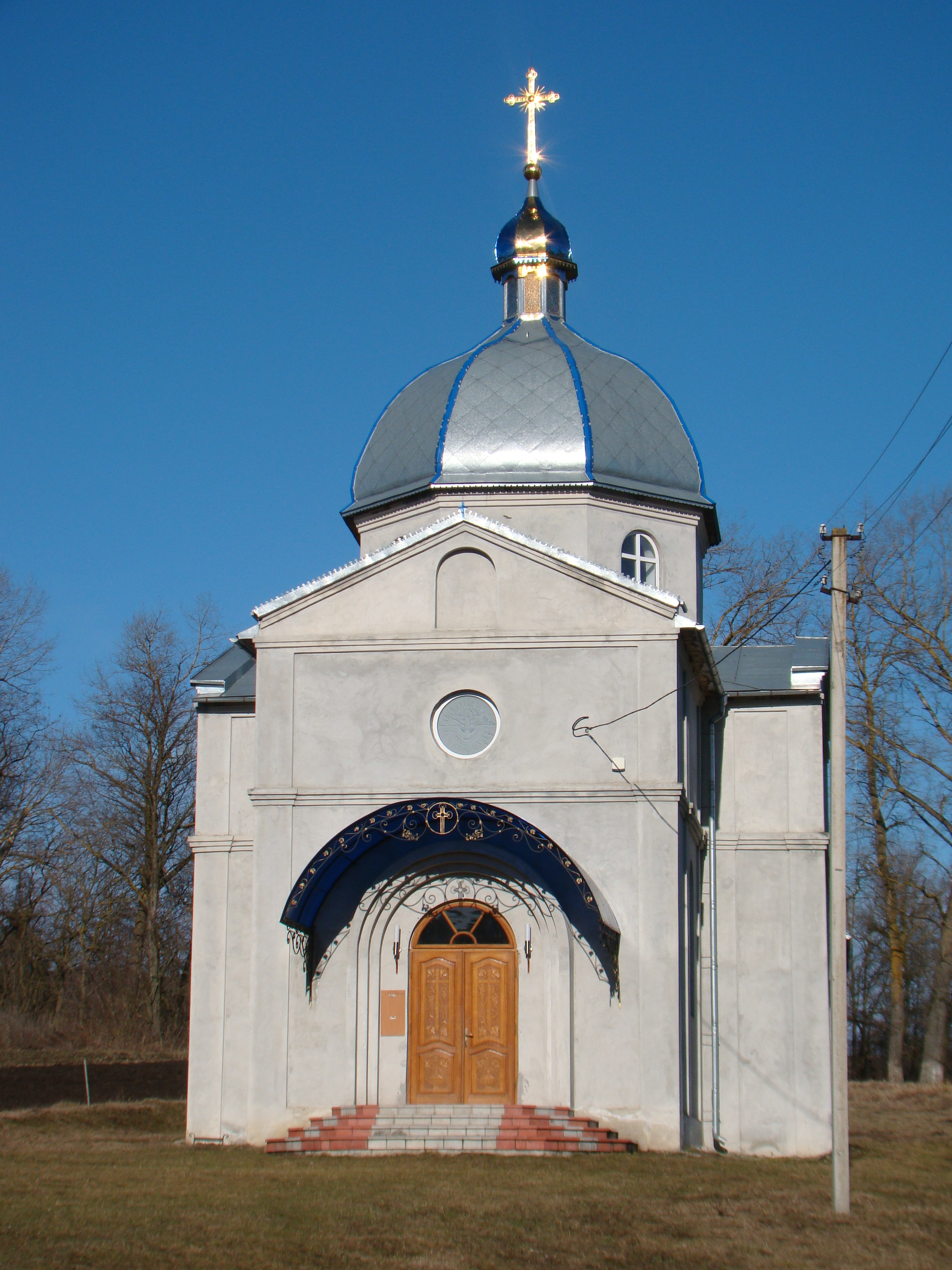
Churches in Komarivka

Komarivka (Ukrainian: Комарівка) is a village in Ternopil Raion of Ternopil Oblast, Ukraine. It belongs to Berezhany urban hromada, one of the hromadas of Ukraine.

Until 18 July 2020, Komarivka belonged to Berezhany Raion. The raion was abolished in July 2020 as part of the administrative reform of Ukraine, which reduced the number of raions of Ternopil Oblast to three. The area of Berezhany Raion was merged into Ternopil Raion.

== Population ==
- Population in 2001: 220 inhabitants with over 64 houses.

== Sources ==
- (in Ukrainian) В. Уніят, Комарівка // Ternopil Encyclopedic Dictionary: in 4 v. / editorial board: H. Yavorskyi and other, Ternopil: "Zbruch", 2005, V. 2: К—О, S. 150. — ISBN 966-528-199-2.
