= Urman, Ukraine =

Rural locality in Ternopil Oblast, Ukraine

Urman У́рмань
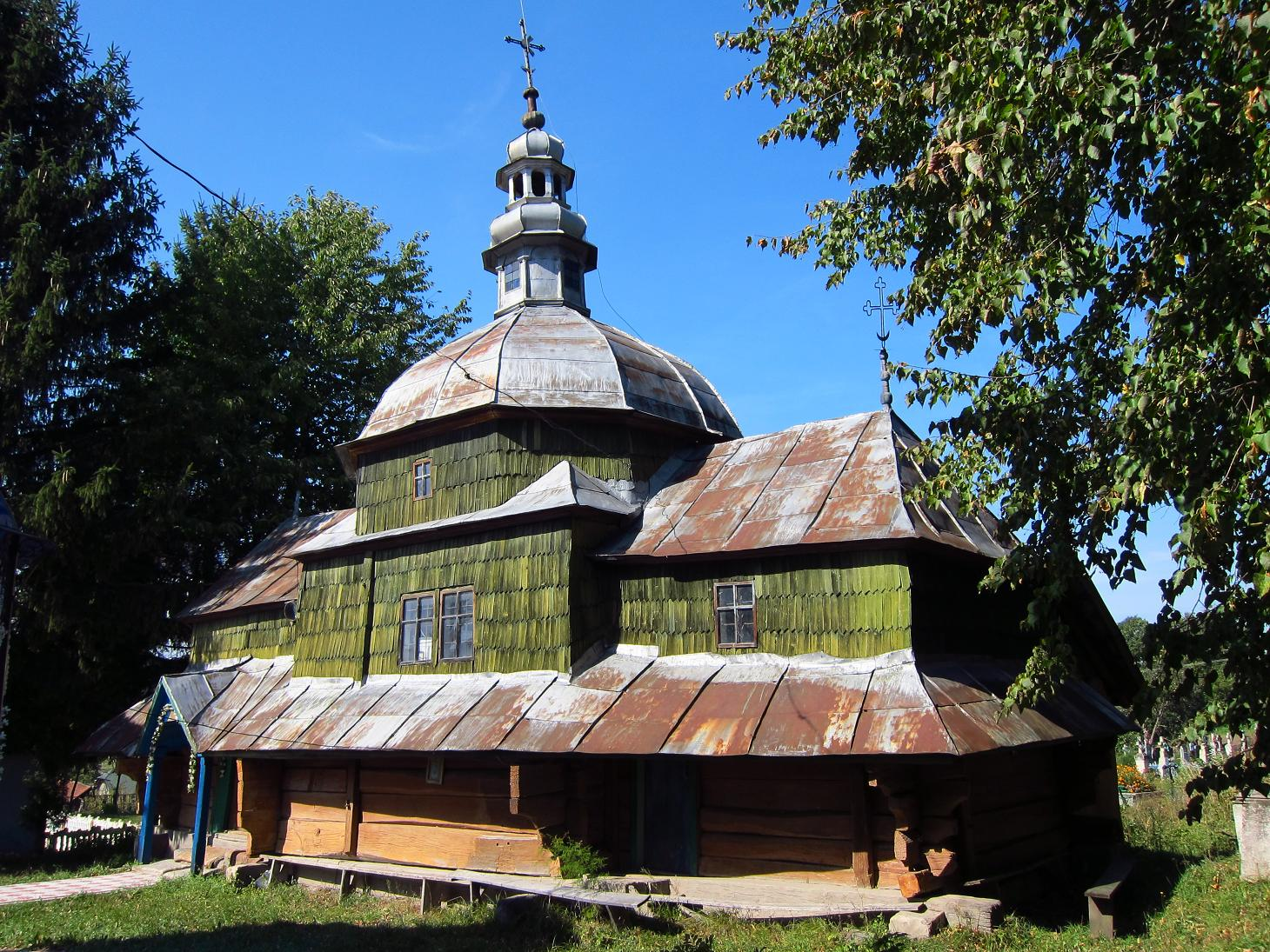
- Church of the Holy Apostles Peter and Paul, Urman

- Location within Ternopil Oblast Urman (Ukraine)
- Coordinates: 49°34′10″N 24°57′4″E
- Country: Ukraine
- Oblast: Ternopil Oblast
- Raion: Ternopil Raion

Area
  - Total: 0.685 km^{2} (0.264 sq mi)
- Elevation: 319 m (1,047 ft)

Population (2001)
  - Total: 691
  - Density: 1,010/km^{2} (2,610/sq mi)
- Postal code: 47510
- Area code: +380 3548

Urman (Ukrainian: У́рмань) is a village in Ternopil Raion, Ternopil Oblast, Ukraine. It is approximately 13 km north of Berezhany and 47 km west from the administrative center of the oblast, Ternopil. The population was 691 at the 2001 census.

It lies in the historic region of Halychyna (Eastern Galicia) and during 1772–1918 was part of Austrian empire, consequently of Poland in 1920-1939 and of Soviet Union in 1939-1991. Urman belongs to Berezhany urban hromada, one of the hromadas of Ukraine.

== Geography of Urman ==
The main part of Urman stretches along the river Zolochiv - Berezhany, with river Zolota Lypa nearby, which forms wide pond. We find two Urmans on geographical maps. One is Velykyy Urman (Great Urman - the main part of the village) and other one is Malyy Urman - minor village suburbs, which are situated along the field road, at 2 kilometers to the south from Velykyy Urman. This suburban part of Urman´ was also called "Na mlynakh" (at the mills), because there was a mill, beyond the pond.

"Urman" means "forest" in Tatar languages (Crimean Tatar and Kazan Tatar). "Urmane" is also old Ukrainian name for Norwegians (mediaeval Varangians / Vikings). One of these two versions might explain the origin of this village name, which is pronounced "oorman" in Ukrainian. It is famous and known first of all because of its nice lake, where many people like to go fishing. The village is situated in beautiful natural surroundings, next to the lake stretched along the valley road, being surrounded by forests. Hills covered with forests (pine, hornbeam, oaks, alder, beech grow here) around Urman are quite high and reach 400 meters. Urman is located on P116 road which connects Berezhany and Zolochiv via Pomoryany. Neighbouring villages are Plikhiv, Rozhadiv, Nadrichne, Zhukiv, Lapshyn (Lapszyn), Pidlisne, Hynovychi, Bishche, Poruchyn, Potoczany, Dryshchiv and Pomoryany.

== History ==
History of Urman is history of Ukraine´s Galician province in miniature. Urman is ancient settlement. Its beginnings reach remote past. We have a documentary mention preserved, that Urman existed already in 1448. Certainly the beginnings of Urman reach much earlier times.

Church in Urman was affiliated with the church in Dryshchiv (Dryszczow in Polish), which is situated at 3 km from Urman Velykyy. But parish priest lived in Urman. The local church in Urman itself is built of wood and is a remarkable piece of wooden architecture. It is consecrated after St Peter and Paul and dates from 1688, according to the inscription, curved out at the doors. It was moved to Urman from Ivano-Frankivsk region (24 pairs of oxen dragged it all the way from Rohatyn according to the legend in 1777).

Until 18 July 2020, Urman was a part of Berezhany Raion. The raion was abolished in July 2020 as part of the administrative reform of Ukraine, which reduced the number of raions of Ternopil Oblast to three. The area of Berezhany Raion was merged into Ternopil Raion.

== Population ==
In 1943, during German rule, it numbered 1900 persons. According to the 2001 Ukrainian census, currently the only official census of the population of independent Ukraine, Urman has 691 inhabitants. 99.8% of those surveyed indicated Ukrainian was their native language.

== Notable residents ==
- Andrii Nakonechnyi (1905–1983), Ukrainian painter.
- Yaroslav Hunka (born 1925), Ukrainian Canadian veteran of Galicia Division.

== Gallery ==
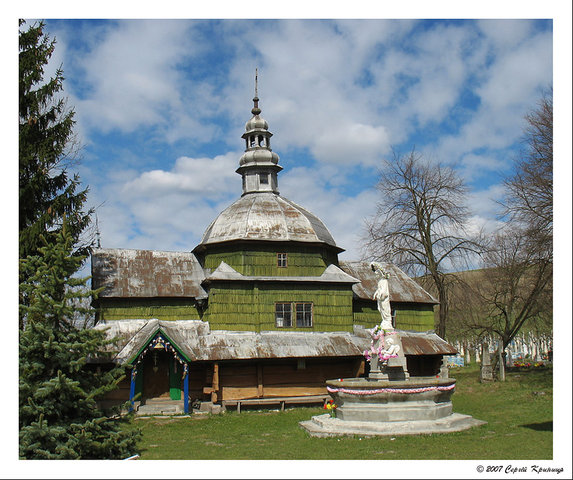

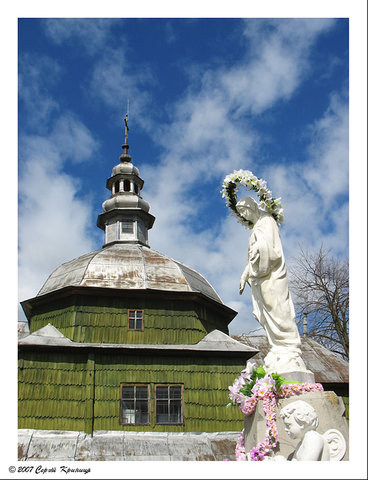

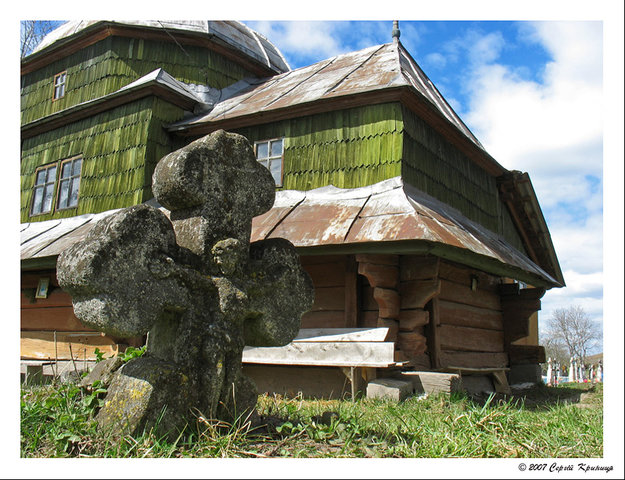

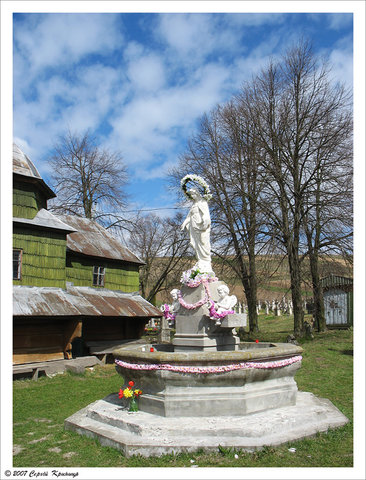

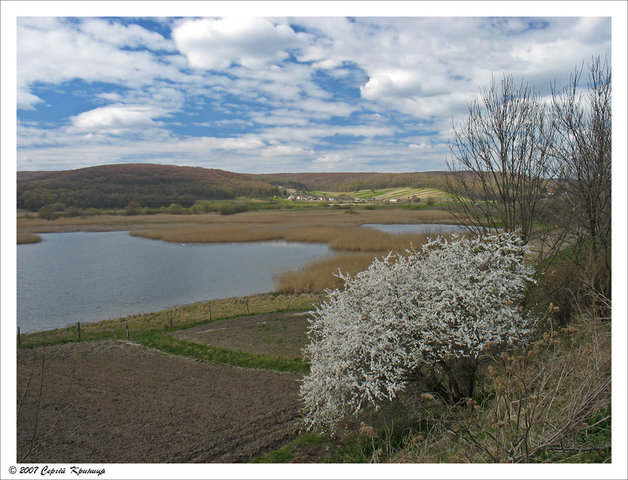

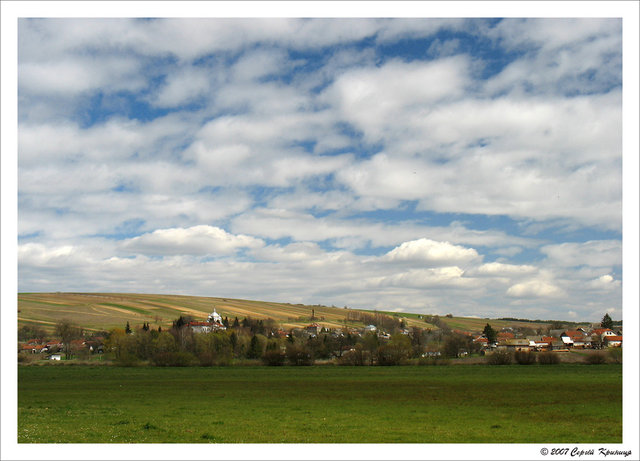

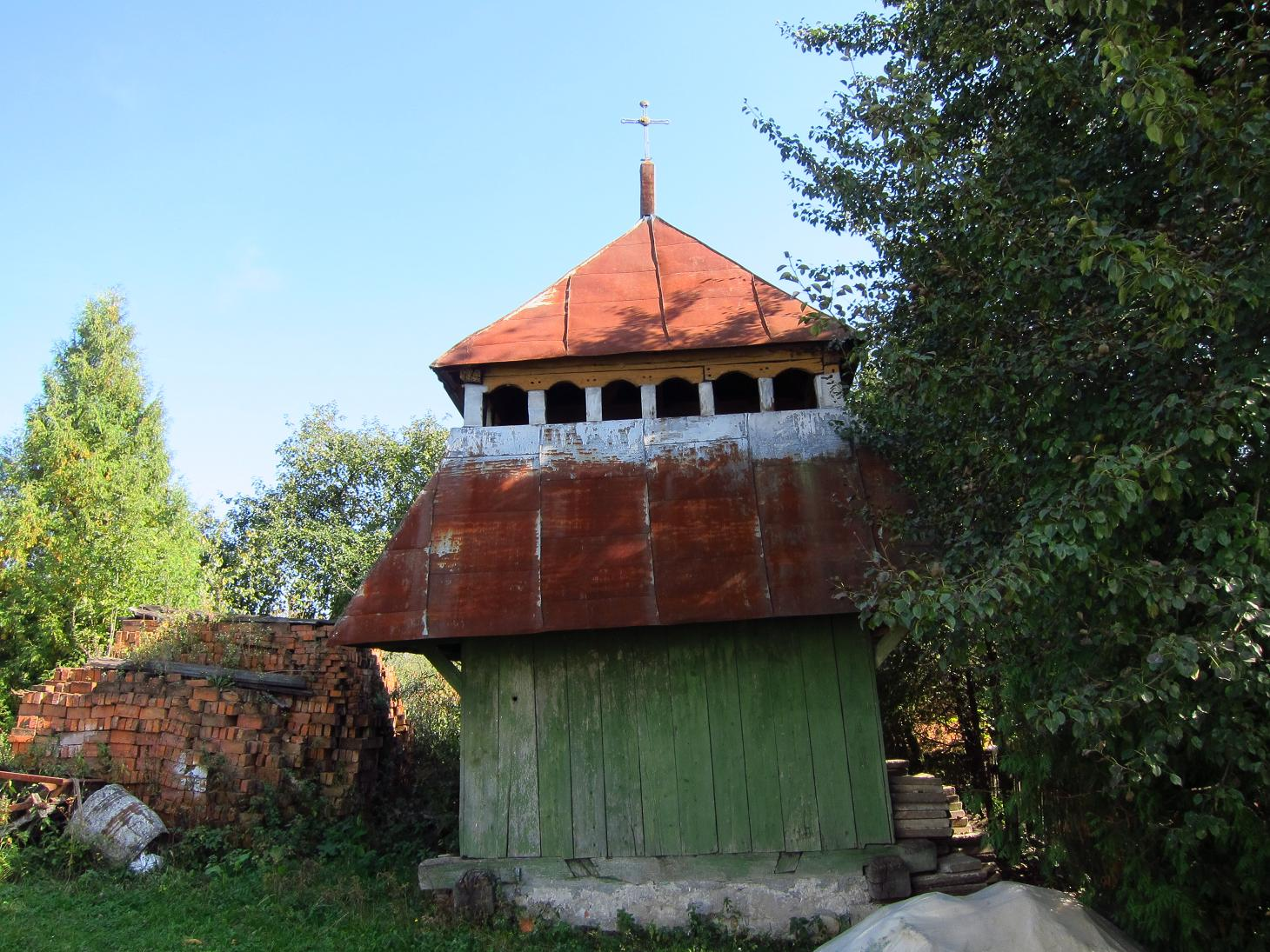

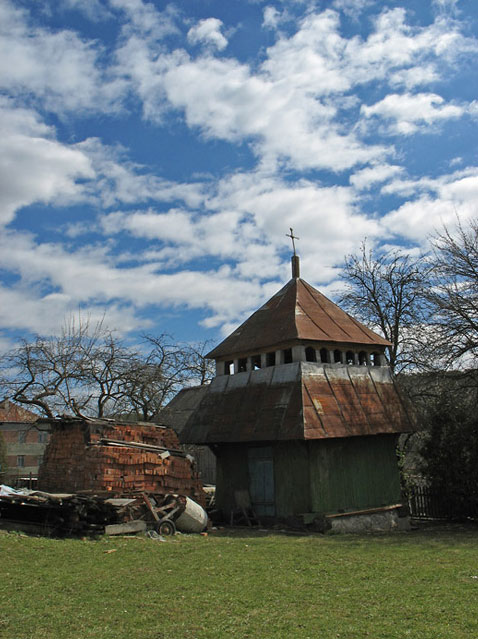
