= Vitalii Shupliak =

Ukrainian artist

- Віталій Олегович Шупляк
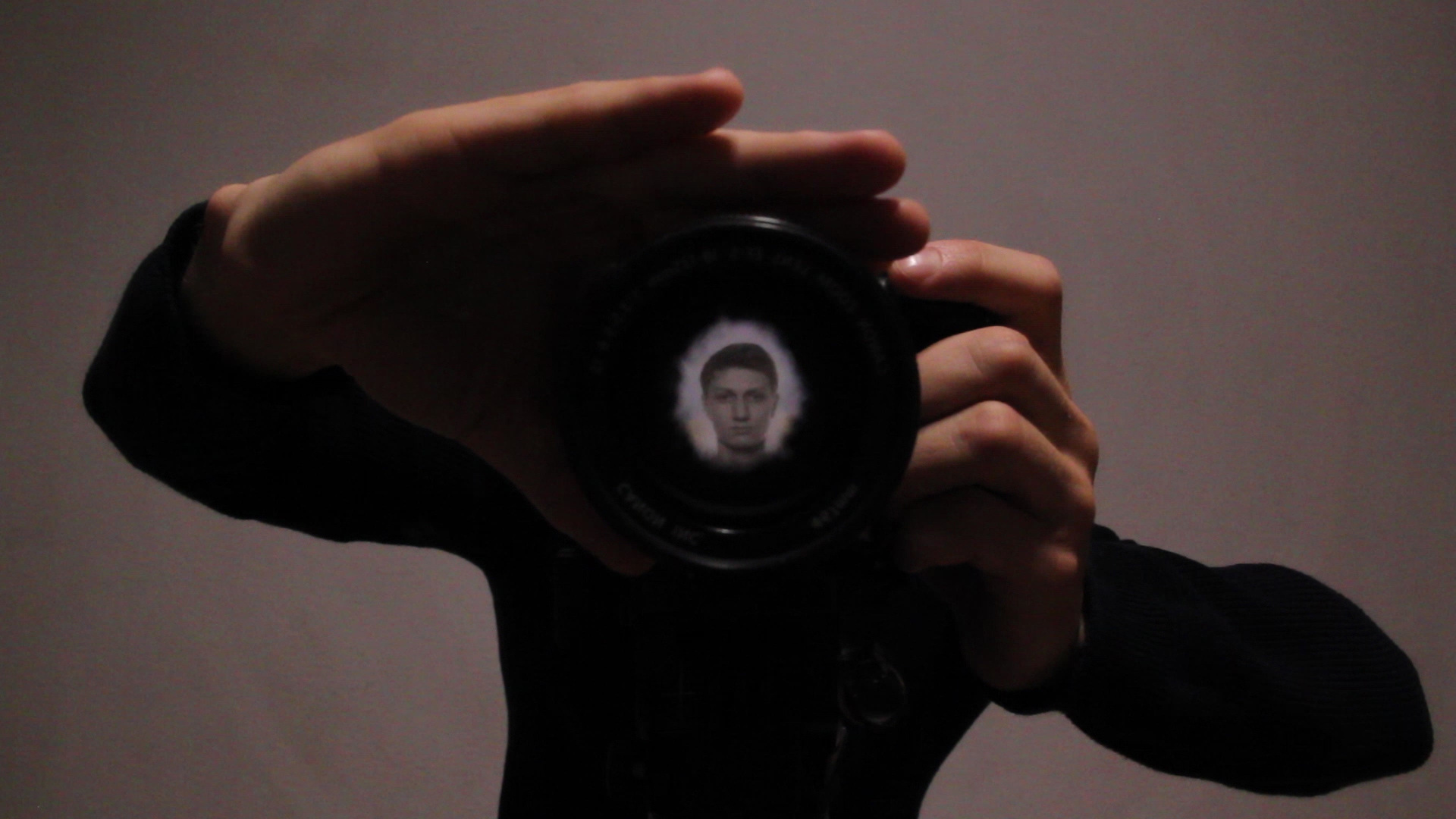
- Born: February 23, 1993 (age 32); Berezhany, Ukraine

Vitalii Shupliak (Ukrainian: Віталій Олегович Шупляк; born 23 February 1993 in Berezhany, Ukraine) is a Ukrainian artist who currently lives in Berlin. Son of Oleh Shupliak, grandson of Nina Shupliak.

== Biography ==
Education:

- 2010 — Berezhany State Art School,
- 2013 — Akademia Sztuk Pięknych w Gdańsku (Poland),
- 2014 — Lviv National Academy of Arts (Ukraine),
- 2018 — Magdalena Abakanowicz University of the Arts Poznan (Poland),
- 2019 — Braunschweig University of Art (Germany).

He was a participant in the Gaude Polonia scholarship program.

He mainly works with video, installation, and performance. Vitalii often focuses on the issues of identity, migration, broadly understood borders, and relations between reality and virtuality. In 2013-14 member of the group Carrousel, in 2014— 2017 Vitalii Shupliak initiated Pi Gallery and since 2019 develops Kruta Art Residency.

Shupliak is an author of 10 solo exhibitions and participant of several group exhibitions and festivals worldwide.

Selected solo exhibitions:

- 2019 — Wearing out trousers, IZONE, Kyiv, Ukraine
- 2019 — Message to heaven, Konsumverein, Braunschweig, Germany
- 2018 — ID, please Rodriguez Gallery, as part of the festival in Malta, Poznan, Poland
- 2018 — Rotational speed, einRaum, Braunschweig, Germany
- 2017 — Signals, Vozdvizhenka House of Arts, Kyiv, Ukraine
- 2017 — Skraj/ność, OKO/UCHO Gallery, Poznań, Poland
- 2014 — Practical Action, Detenpyla Gallery, Lviv, Ukraine

== Awards ==
- 2 Minutes shorts Award ex aequo at the 34th International Film Festival (Stuttgart, Germany)
- initial award 13 In out festival at the Lania Center for Contemporary Art (Gdańsk, Poland)
- main award of FilmFestSpezial in Kunstlerhaus (Hannover, Germany).

== Sources ==
- "Vitalii Shupliak". videomedeja.org.
- "Great Patriotic. Celina Kanunnikava, Hanna Shumska, Vitalii Shupliak, Endre Tót". galeriabwa.bydgoszcz.pl.
- "Vitalii SHUPLIAK". lvivartlab.com.
- "VITALII SHUPLIAK (UKRAINE/POLAND)". personal.kiblaportal.org.
- "Artist Vitalii Shupliak in residence at IZOLYATSIA". izolyatsia.org.
- "Vitalii Shupliak". website.kunstverein-tiergarten.de.
- "VITALII SHUPLIAK: "I VALUE EXPERIMENTATION, PLAYING WITH FORM, OBSERVING"". korydor.in.ua.
- "Vitalii Shupliak". studiesonsymbolicviolence.org.
- "Vitalii Shupliak". contexts.com.pl.
- "За екраном: тілесність, дійсність та диджиталізація Віталія Шупляка". www.prostranstvo.media.
- "Identical Identity. In Conversation with Agnieszka Grodzińska and Vitalii Shupliak". www.blokmagazine.com.
- ""Identical Identity" Agnieszki Grodzińskiej i Vitalia Shupliaka w Galerii Miasta Trzyńca". www.magazynszum.pl.
- "Dar do kolekcji: Vitalii Shupliak". www.torun.pl.
- "Vitalii Shupliak. Signals". www.32vozdvizhenka.com.
- "HIDING IN PLAIN SIGHT: STUDIES ON SYMBOLIC VIOLENCE". www.theaterhaus-berlin.com.
- "'Extraterritorial', Off-Site Group Project at Polish Minimarket, Reykjavik". www.tzvetnik.online.
- "Сакральний простір IX - виставковий проєкт". www.lnam.edu.ua.
- ""Як воно є…" – фестиваль ефемерного мистецтва в Соколовсько". www.naszwybir.pl.
- "Зрозумів тебе". www.artsvit.dp.ua.
- ""Мистецтво — це про пошук зв'язку": художник з Бережан отримав нагороду на кінофестивалі у Німеччині". www.te.20minut.ua.
- "Віітлій Шупляк". www.mitec.ua.
