= Berezhany urban hromada =

Hromada in Ternopil Oblast, Ukraine

Berezhany urban hromada Бережанська міська громада
- hromada
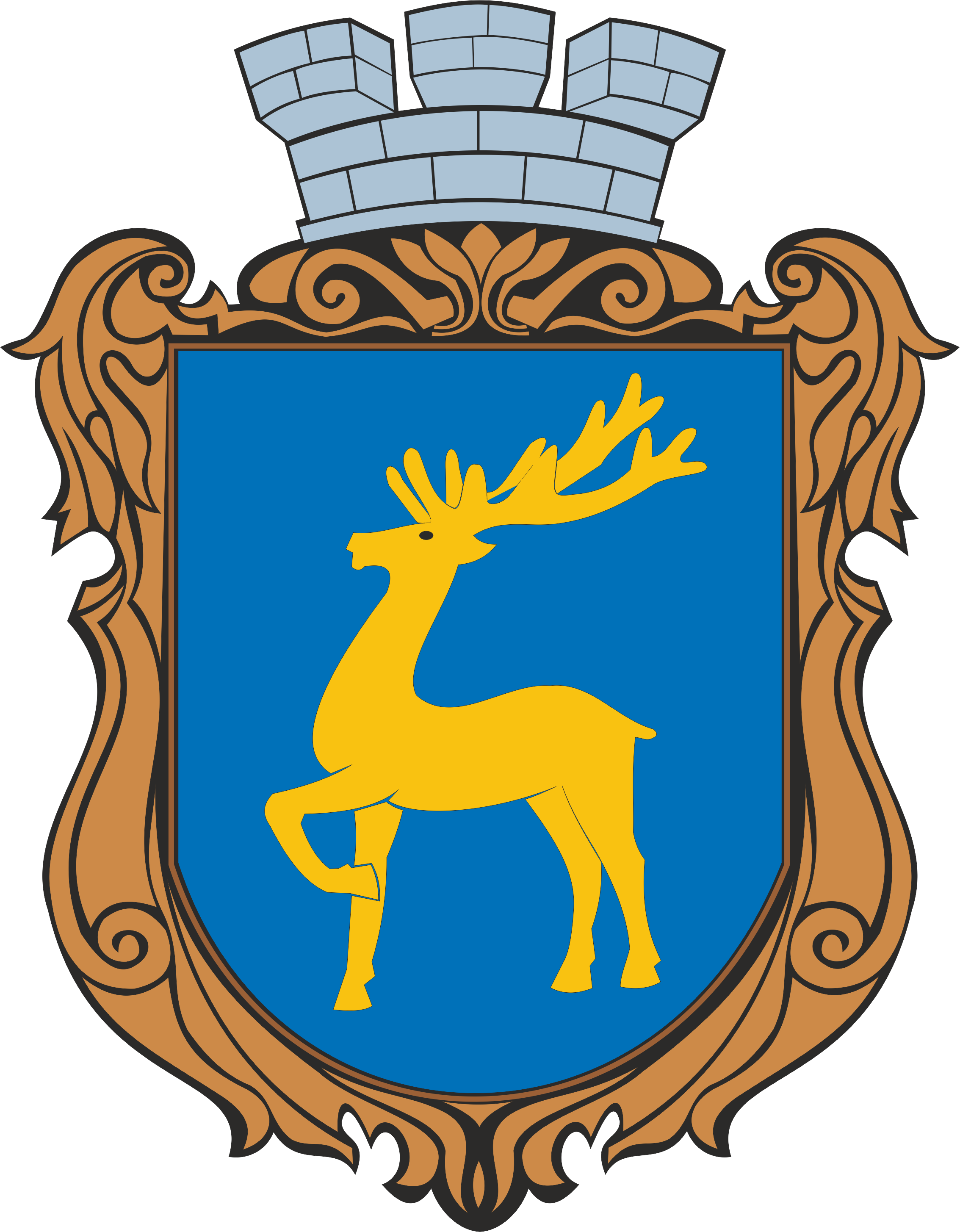
- Seal

- Location within Ternopil Oblast Location within Ukraine
- Coordinates: 49°26′45″N 24°56′10″E
- Country: Ukraine
- Oblast (province): Ternopil Oblast
- Raion (district): Ternopil Raion
- Administrative center: Berezhany

Government
  - Hromada head: Rostyslav Bortnyk

Population (2023)
  - Total: 26,259
- Villages: 20

Berezhany urban hromada (Ukrainian: Бережанська міська територіальна громада, romanized: Berezhanska miska terytorialna hromada) is a hromada of Ukraine, in Ternopil Raion of Ternopil Oblast. Its administrative center is Berezhany. It has a population of 26,259 (2022 estimate)

Until 18 July 2020, the hromada belonged to the city of oblast significance of Berezhany. As part of the administrative reform of Ukraine, which reduced the number of raions of Ternopil Oblast to three, the city was merged into Ternopil Raion.

== Settlements ==
In addition to the city of Berezhany, the hromada includes 20 villages:

- Baranivka
- Bishche
- Hynovychi
- Zhovnivka
- Zhukiv
- Zaluzhzhia
- Komarivka
- Krasnopushcha
- Kuropatnyky
- Lisnyky
- Nadrichne
- Pidlisne
- Plikhiv
- Poruchyn
- Posukhiv
- Potutory
- Rai
- Urman
- Shybalyn
- Yasne

== Head ==
- Rostyslav Bortnyk — the mayor of Berezhany, the head of the hromada
