= Oleg Shupliak =

Ukrainian artist

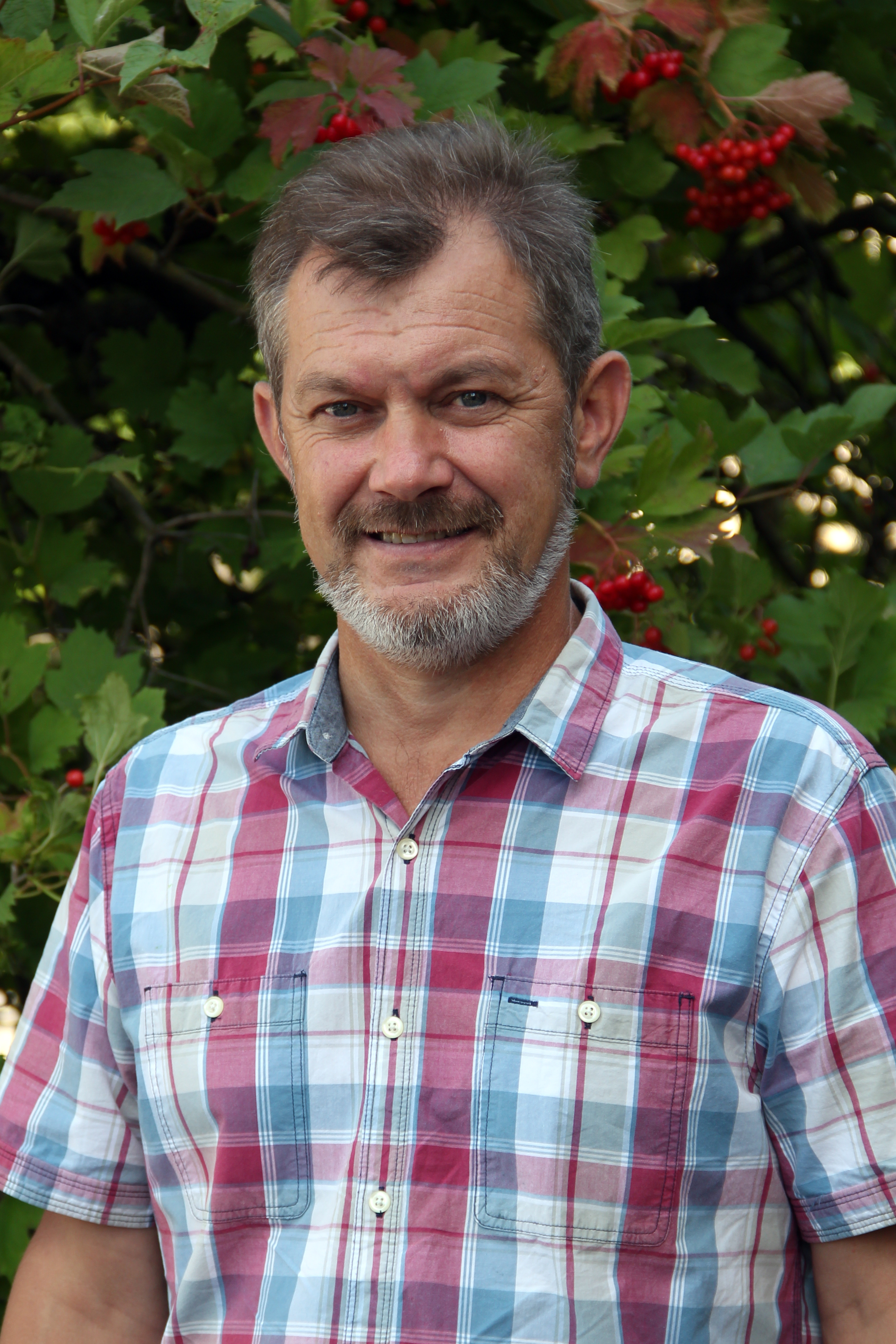
- Website: shupliak.art

Oleg Illich Shupliak (Ukrainian: Олег Ілліч Шупляк; born 23 September 1967 in Bishche, Ternopil Oblast, Ukrainian Soviet Socialist Republic) is a Ukrainian artist living in Berezhany. He is the son of Nina Shupliak, and the father of Vitalii Shupliak.

== Life and works ==
He creates artistic works in optical illusion, such as imaginative portrait heads named 'Hidden Images'. He uses painting, photography, graphics, illustration and animation. In 1991, he graduated the Architecture Department of the Lviv Polytechnic National University. Since 2000 he has been a member of the National Union of Artists of Ukraine. He is the creator of the official logo of the 200th anniversary of the birth of Taras Shevchenko.

== Main exhibitions ==
- 2020 - personal exhibition at the Centro Cultural Eduardo Úrculo (Madrid, Spain)
- 2019 - personal exhibition at the Embassy of Ukraine in France (Paris, France)
- 2019 - personal exhibition in the cultural and information center of Ukraine in France (Paris, France)
- 2019 - personal exhibition "Native Land" at the Diplomatic Academy of Ukraine (Kyiv)
- 2019 - personal exhibition at the US Embassy in Ukraine (Kyiv)
- 2018 - personal exhibition "IMAGINARIUM" at the Bangkok Art and Culture Center "BACC" (Bangkok, Thailand)
- 2018 - personal exhibition at the Casa Museu Medeiros e Almeida (Lisbon, Portugal)
- 2018 - personal exhibition at the Royal National Palace (Mafra, Portugal)
- 2017 - personal exhibition in Museu Pio XII (Braga, Portugal)
- 2017 - personal exhibition at the Centro Nacional de Cultura, Galeria Fernando Pessoa (Lisbon, Portugal)
- 2017 - personal exhibition at the Muzeum Ziemi Lubuskiej (Zielona Gora, Poland)
- 2017 - personal exhibition in the museum in Petrovaradin Fortress (Novi Sad, Serbia)
- 2017 - International Exhibition at Grisolart Galleries (Barcelona, Spain)
- 2017 - personal exhibition in the gallery Arteria BCN (Barcelona, Spain)
- 2016 - personal exhibition in the house of Culture (Rivne)
- 2016 - personal exhibition within the festival "Ukrainian Spring" (Poznan, Poland)
- 2015 - 2016 - a series of exhibitions within the project "Christmas Vernissage" (Budapest, Hungary / Udine, Italy / Barcelona, Spain)
- 2015 - personal exhibition "IMAGINARIUM" (Poznan, Poland)
- 2014 - personal exhibition "DVOVZORY" in the society "Znannia" of Ukraine (Kyiv)
- 2013 - personal exhibition "Metamorphoses" (Vejle, Denmark)
- 2013 - personal exhibition "Dyvosvit" in the National Architectural and Historical Reserve"Ancient Chernihiv" (Chernihiv)
- 2013 - personal exhibition "Metamorphoses", gallery "N-prospect" (St. Petersburg, Russia)
- 2012 - personal exhibition at the Taras Shevchenko National Museum, (Kyiv)
- 2001-2011 - participant in group exhibitions in Ukraine and abroad
- 1994 - personal exhibition (Berezhany)
- 1994 - personal exhibition (Nottingham, Derby, England)
- 1991 - a collective exhibition of Ukrainian artists in the Ukrainian House (New York, USA)
- 1991 - personal exhibition (Berezhany)

== Prizes and awards ==
- 1996 - Second Prize in the Regional exhibition of Sacred Art (Ternopil)
- 2013 - Gold medal and a diploma laureate "For excellence in creating a unique style of Art". International Foundation "Cultural Heritage" (St.Petersburg)
- 2013 - First Prize in the Ukrainian open competition for the best design of a logo to commemorate the 200th anniversary of the birth of Taras Shevchenko
- 2014 - a regional award named after Mykhailo Boichuk for a significant contribution to the development of fine arts
- 2016 - Distinction of the President of Ukraine - anniversary medal "25 years of independence of Ukraine"
- 2016 - Awarded the title - "Honorary Citizen of Berezhany"
- 2017 - Honored Artist of Ukraine since
- 2018 - All-Ukrainian award named after Lepky brothers
- 2021 - Designer of the 5 hryvnia coin "30th anniversary of Ukrainian independence"

== Works in collections ==
The works are in the collections of the Taras Shevchenko National Museum in Kyiv, the Ministry of Culture of Ukraine, the Ontario Scientific Center (Canada), the International Cultural Heritage Foundation (St. Petersburg), as well as in private collections in many countries.

== Bibliography ==
- Shupliak Oleh Illich / I. M. Duda // Encyclopedia of Modern Ukraine [Online] / Eds. : I. М. Dziuba, A. I. Zhukovsky, M. H. Zhelezniak [et al.]; National Academy of Sciences of Ukraine, Shevchenko Scientific Society. – Kyiv : The NASU institute of Encyclopedic Research, 2025.
