= Trostianets, Saranchuky rural hromada, Ternopil Raion, Ternopil Oblast =

Rural locality in Ternopil Oblast, Ukraine

Coordinates: 49°19′54″N 24°55′29″E

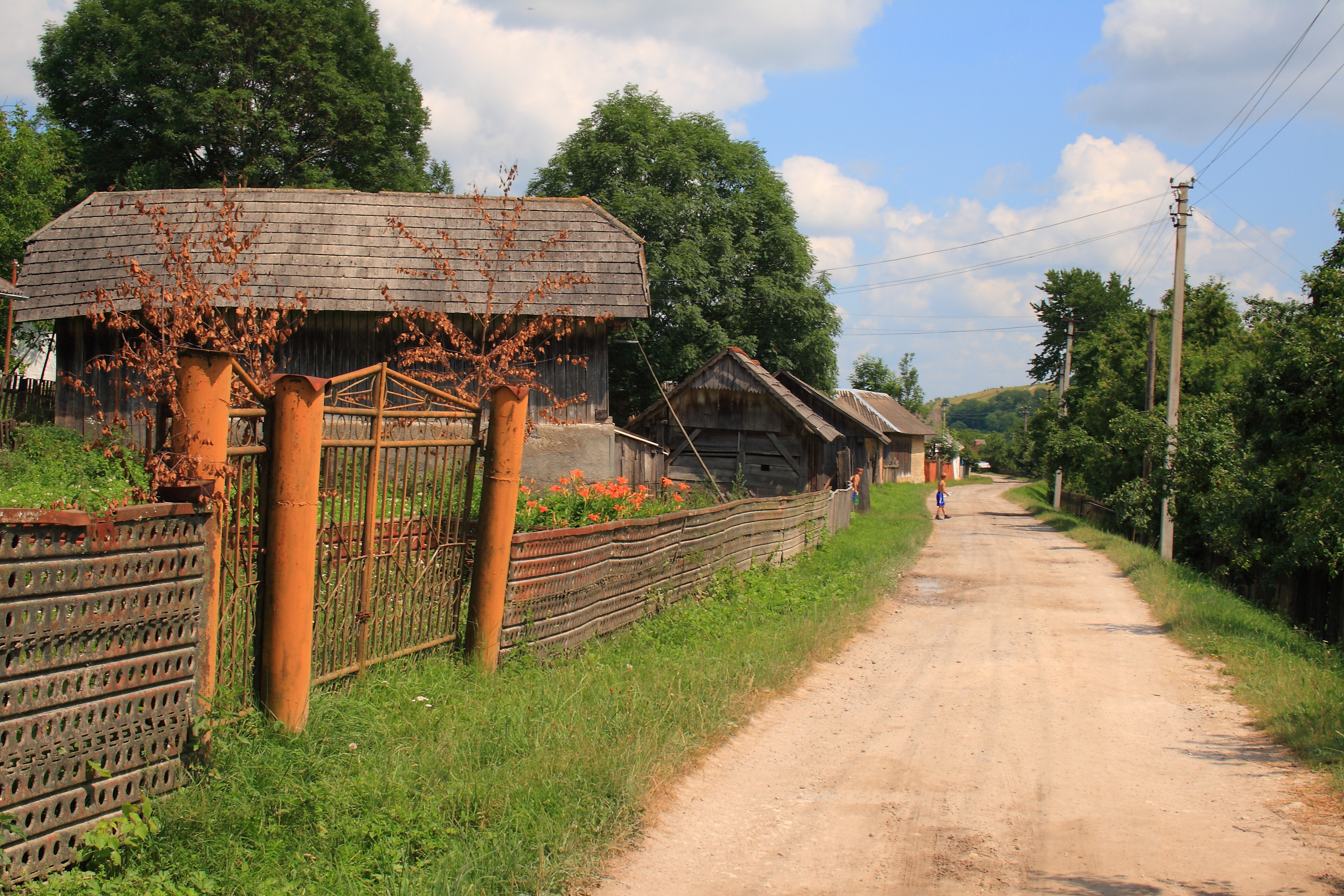
Street in Trostianets

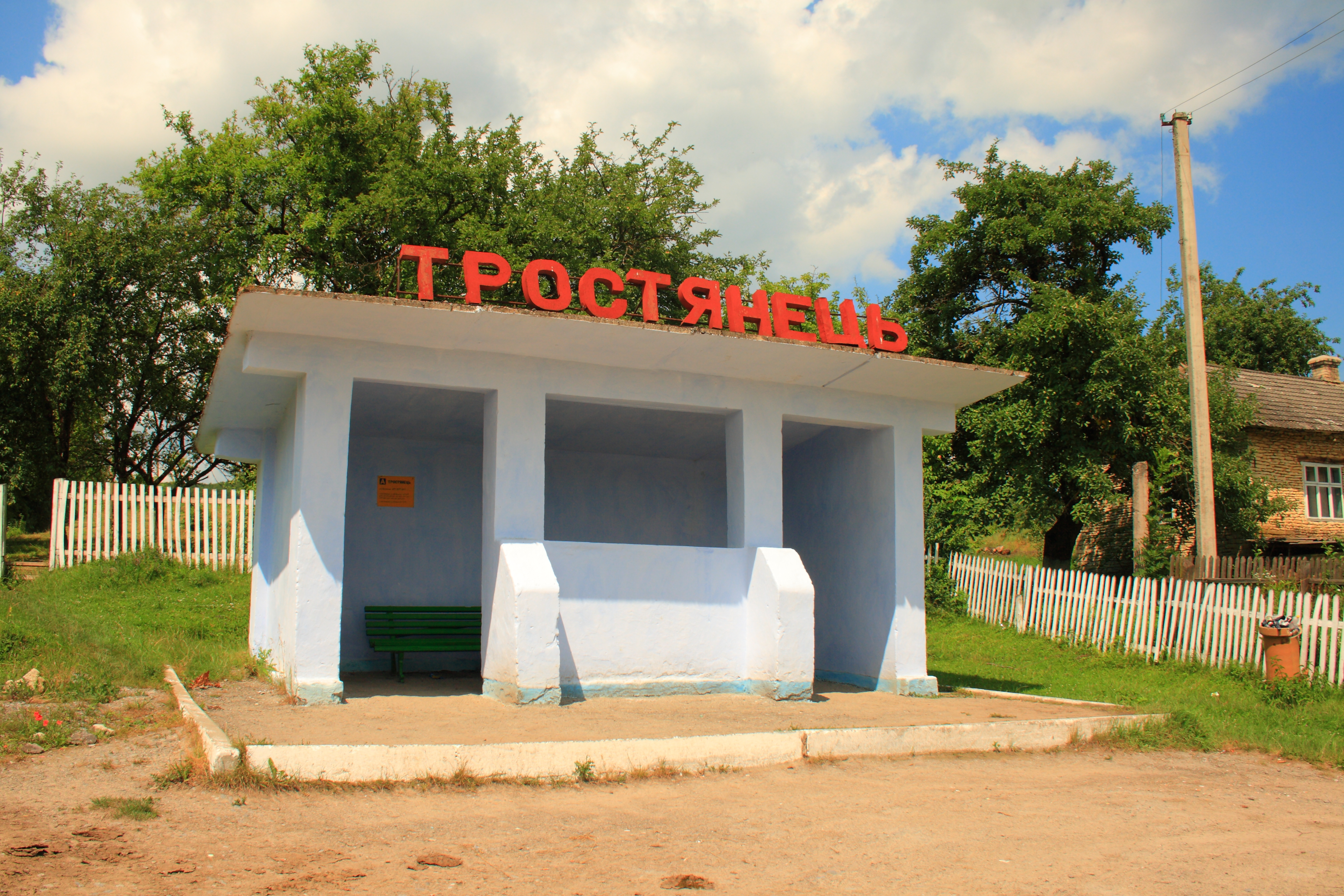
Bus stop at Trostianets. There are two daily bus connections to Berezhany city.

Trostianets (Ukrainian: Тростянець, romanized: Trostyanets, Russian: Тростянец, romanized: Trostyanets, Polish: Troscianiec, Troscaniec, Yiddish: טראָסטיניץ, romanized: Trostinits) is a village of 428 people in Ternopil Raion (county) of Ternopil Oblast of western Ukraine. It belongs to Saranchuky rural hromada, one of the hromadas of Ukraine. Trostianets lies in the very heart of the historic region of Halychyna (Eastern Galicia). The current population is decreasing as a result of the remoteness of the village, and many houses are left empty. The village is located in a very remote forest area about 20 km south-west of Berezhany, among thick and large forests which provided the name for the village - Trostyanets (from "Troshchi," thick woods). The landscape is very picturesque, with a little brook in the village valley, surrounded by pasture hills on both sides. One hill's name is "Sus' hill" from the Tartar word "sus," swine. There was a fire post on that mountain which gave signs when the Tartars came to invade. There is a lake at the southern end of the village. The closest villages are Siltse (locally referred to as Siulko) and Bozhykiv (formerly Kvitkove).

The village witnessed heavy front-line fighting during the First World War, and there is a desolate Russian military cemetery with Orthodox crosses deep in the forest, as well as numerous Austrian military cemeteries in the neighborhood. Two million troops were concentrated in the region in times of the First World War with casualties measured in many thousands.

Until 18 July 2020, Trostianets belonged to Berezhany Raion. The raion was abolished in July 2020 as part of the administrative reform of Ukraine, which reduced the number of raions in Ternopil Oblast to three. The area of Berezhany Raion was merged into Ternopil Raion.

The distance to the closest railway station in Potutory is 11 km.

== Population ==
- Population in 1900: 1179 inhabitants (19 Jews)
- Population in 1939: 1370 inhabitants (5 Jews)
- Population in 2007: 428 inhabitants, including 272 houses

== Nearby localities ==
- Saranchuky
- Berezhany
- Bozhykiv
- Shybalyn
- Kotiv
- Potutory
