= Dibrova =

Dibrova (Ukrainian: Діброва) may refer to the following places in Ukraine:

- Dibrova, Saranchuky rural hromada, Ternopil Raion, Ternopil Oblast
- Dibrova, Saranchuky Hromada, Ternopil Raion
- Dibrova, Zbarazh Hromada, Ternopil Raion
- Dibrova, Zhytomyr Oblast
- Dibrova, Sievierodonetsk Raion, Luhansk Oblast
- Dibrova, Vyshhorod Raion, Kyiv Oblast
- Dibrova, Bakhmut Raion
