= Dibrova, Ternopil Oblast =

Dibrova, Ternopil Oblast may refer to:

- Dibrova — Saranchuky Hromada; former Berezhany Raion
- Dibrova — Vyshnivets Hromada; former Zbarazh Raion, Kokhanivka Rural Council
- Dibrova — Zbarazh Hromada; former Zbarazh Raion, Shyly Rural Council
- Dibrova — Kremenets Hromada; former Kremenets Raion
- Dibrova — Koropets Hromada; former Monastyryska Raion
