= Chervone, Ternopil Oblast =

Rural locality in Ternopil Oblast, Ukraine

Chervone Червоне
- Location in Ternopil Oblast
- Coordinates: 49°22′51″N 24°53′22″E
- Country: Ukraine
- Oblast: Ternopil Oblast
- Raion: Ternopil Raion

Population (2021)
  - Total: ▼1 (2,021)
- Time zone: UTC+2 (EET)
  - Summer (DST): UTC+3 (EEST)
- Postal code: 47525
- Area code: +380 3548

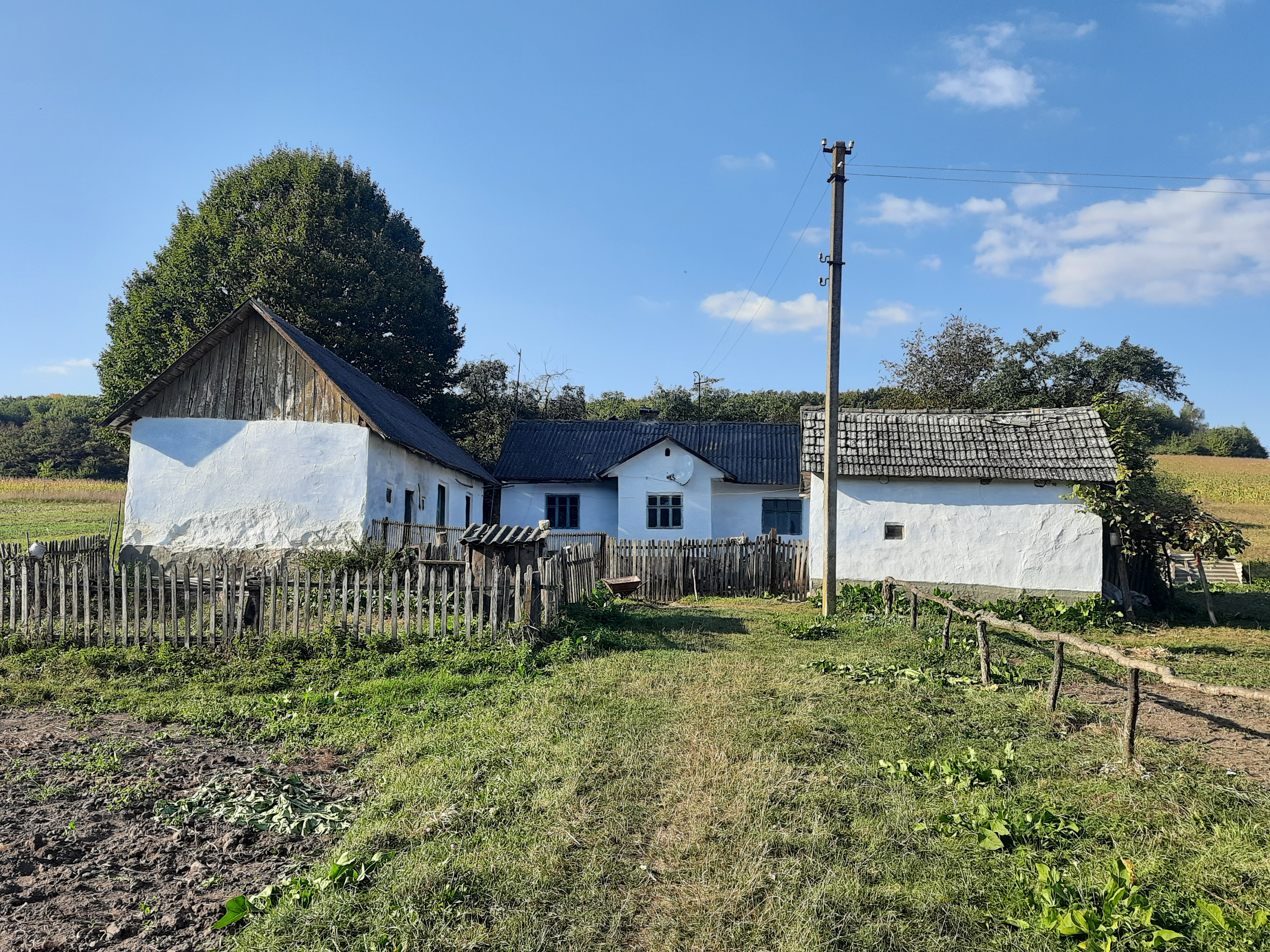
House in the village of Chervone Ternopil district, Ternopil region

Chervone (Ukrainian: Червоне) is a village in Ternopil Raion of Ternopil Oblast, Ukraine. It belongs to Saranchuky rural hromada, one of the hromadas of Ukraine.

Until 18 July 2020, Chervone belonged to Berezhany Raion. The raion was abolished in July 2020 as part of the administrative reform of Ukraine, which reduced the number of raions of Ternopil Oblast to three. The area of Berezhany Raion was merged into Ternopil Raion.

== Population ==
- Population in 2014: 27.
- Population in 2021: 1.
