= Walter Klymkiw =

Canadian chorus master of Ukrainian origin (1926–2000)

- Володимир Климків
- Born: Volodymyr Hryhorovych Klymkiv; 3 October 1926; Saranchuky, now Ternopil Oblast, Ukraine
- Died: 4 December 2000 (aged 74); Winnipeg, Canada
- Education: University of British Columbia, University of Manitoba
- Awards: Shevchenko medal

Walter Klymkiw (Ukrainian: Володимир Климків; born 3 October 1926, Saranchuky, now Ternopil Oblast, Ukraine – 4 December 2000, Winnipeg, Canada) was a Canadian chorus master, educator, and public figure of Ukrainian origin. Doctor of Theology. Member of the Ukrainian Free Academy of Sciences. Laureate of the Ukrainian Canadian Congress Shevchenko Medal (1992).

== Biography ==
Walter Klymkiw was born on 3 October 1926 in Saranchuky, now the Saranchuky Hromada, Ternopil Raion, Ternopil Oblast, Ukraine. In 1928, he emigrated to Canada with his parents.

He graduated from the University of British Columbia (1950, Bachelor of Arts in English Language and Literature and History) and the University of Manitoba (1958, Bachelor of Education, conducting and composition courses). After graduation, he studied conducting with Oleksandr and Tetiana Koshyts, Pavlo Matsenko, Robert Shaw, and Roger Wagner, and studied violon with M. Napadia.

=== Conducting activity ===
From 1951 to 1990, he conducted the Choir of Young Ukrainian Nationalists (later the Oleksandr Koshyts Choir), with which he toured many countries, including Argentina, Brazil, Belgium, Germany, France, and Ukraine (1978, 1982, 1990, 1993).

In 1988, together with the choir, he took part in a concert on the occasion of the 1000th anniversary of the Christianization of Rus'. Under his direction, the ensemble premiered several works: Palm Suite for tenor, choir and orchestra by Marian Kuzan; When the Fern Blossoms, a suite for choir and orchestra; Black Elegy, based on the words of P. Movchan, performed with the Winnipeg Symphony Orchestra (both with music by Yevhen Stankovych); and the oratorio Volodymyr of Kyiv by D. Shchur. Together with the ensemble, he became the first recipient of the Shevchenko Prize awarded outside Ukraine (1992).

He popularized the works of Ukrainian classical and contemporary composers; he had an active collaboration with the Winnipeg Symphony Orchestra, conductors Ruben Hurvych, Pierre Gambaud, Virko Baley and Bramwell Tovey.

=== Public activity ===
He worked as a teacher (from 1953), principal of the city schools "Hastings" (1961–1979), "Glenwood" (1979–1983). He was the head of the Provincial Executive of Young Ukrainian Nationalists and the Winnipeg Ukrainian Cultural and Educational Centre.

In the 1960s, he co-founded and was the impresario of the DK Attractions company, thanks to which Walter Klymkiw was able to invite many artistic groups and soloists from Ukraine to Canada for the first time in 1967 (among them the Veryovka Ukrainian Folk Choir, directed by Anatolii Avdiievskyi).

Founder of the Winnipeg Carols Festival; initiator and organizer of the Department of Church Music at the University of Manitoba. He recorded Ukrainian music, in particular the liturgical music of Mykola Leontovych (1998). He studied the archival materials of Oleksandr Koshyts.

== Legacy ==
In 1999, the Oleksandr Kosyts Choir established the Walter Klymkiw Charitable Foundation at the Faculty of Music of the University of Manitoba.

== Sources ==
- (in Ukrainian) Мельничук Б., Павлів, Я., Климків Володимир-Петро Григорович // Ternopil Encyclopedic Dictionary: in 4 v. / editorial board: H. Yavorskyi and other, Ternopil: "Zbruch", 2005, V. 2: К—О, S. 86–87. — ISBN 966-528-199-2.
- Климків Володимир-Петро Григорович (3.10.1926–бл. 16.12.2000) – диригент, педагог // Мистці Тернопільщини. Частина 1. Образотворче мистецтво: бібліографічний покажчик / департамент культури, релігій та національностей Тернопільської облдержадміністарації, Тернопільська обласна університецька наукова бібліотека; укладач Миськів В.; вступна стаття І. Дуда; керівник проєкту та науковий редактор Вітенко В.; редактор Жовтко Г., Тернопіль : Підручники і посібники, 2015, s. 238–240, ISBN 978-966-07-2936-0.
- Володимир Климків (1926–2000) — диригент, педагог, музично-громадський діяч // Бенч-Шокало, О. Український хоровий спів: Актуалізація звичаєвої традиції: Навч. посібник, К., 2002, s. 240–242.
- Пам'яті друга // Culture and Life, 16.12.2000.
- Костюк, Н. Пісня-спогад про митця: Пам'яті Володимира Климківа // Культура і життя, 23.06.2001.
