= Nova Hreblia, Ternopil Oblast =

Rural locality in Ternopil Oblast, Ukraine

Nova Hreblia Нова Гребля
- Location in Ternopil Oblast
- Coordinates: 49°23′11″N 24°58′0″E
- Country: Ukraine
- Oblast: Ternopil Oblast
- Raion: Ternopil Raion
- Hromada: Saranchuky rural hromada
- Time zone: UTC+2 (EET)
  - Summer (DST): UTC+3 (EEST)
- Postal code: 47531

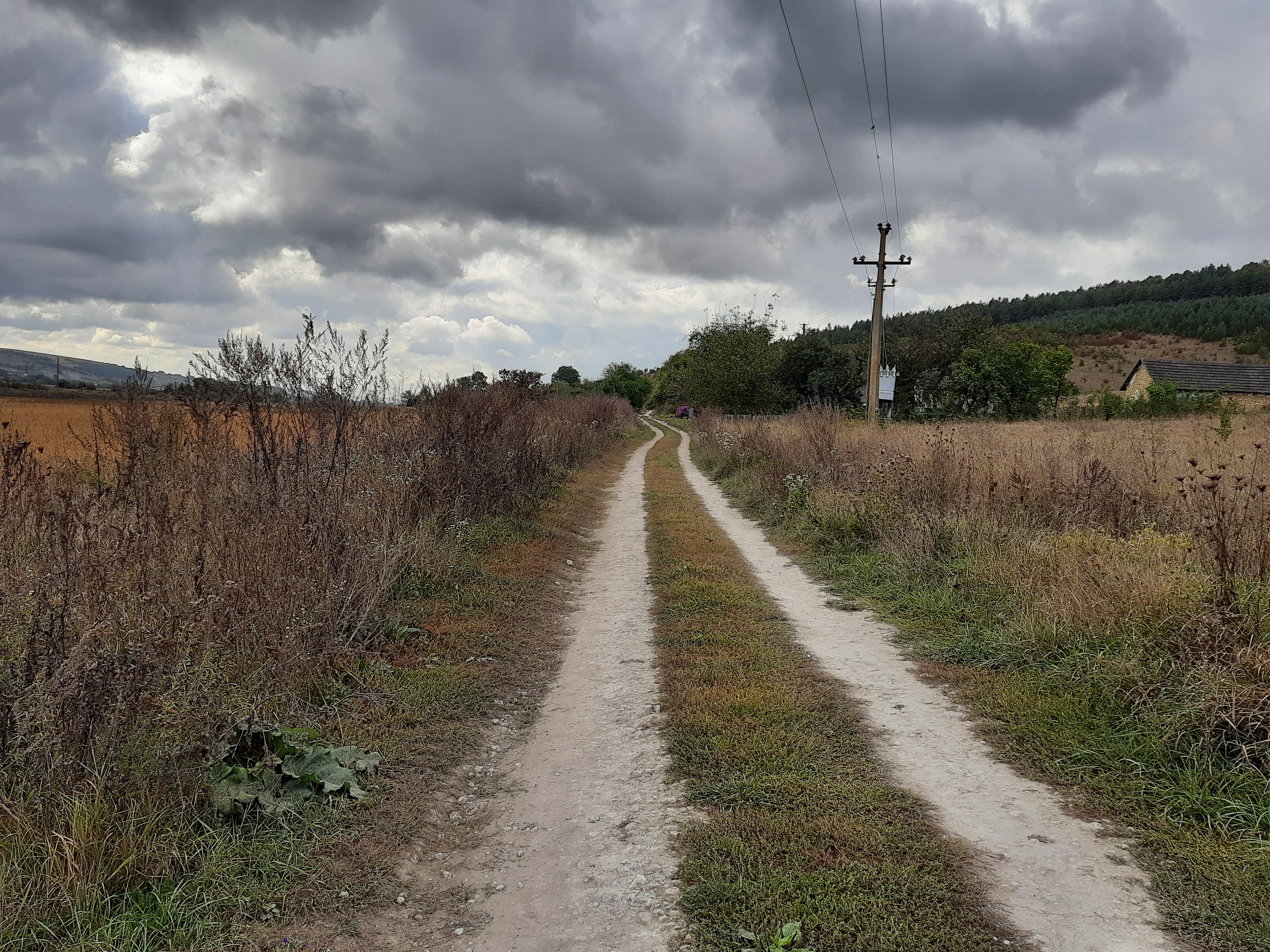
Road leading to Nova Hreblia.

Nova Hreblia (Ukrainian: Нова Гребля) is a village in Saranchuky rural hromada, Ternopil Raion, Ternopil Oblast, Ukraine.

== History ==
The village is known from 1807.

After the liquidation of the Berezhany Raion on 19 July 2020, the village became part of the Ternopil Raion.

== Religion ==
- St. Michael chapel (1993).

== Sources ==
- (in Ukrainian) Болюх Ю., Уніят Г., Нова Гребля // Ternopil Encyclopedic Dictionary: in 4 v. / editorial board: H. Yavorskyi and other, Ternopil: "Zbruch", 2005, V. 2: К—О, S. 636. — ISBN 966-528-199-2.
- "Nowa Grobla, pow. brzeżański". Geographical Dictionary of the Kingdom of Poland (in Polish). 7. Warszawa: Kasa im. Józefa Mianowskiego. 1886. p. 194.
