= Saranchuky =

Rural locality in Ternopil Oblast, Ukraine

Coordinates: 49°21′03″N 24°59′09″E

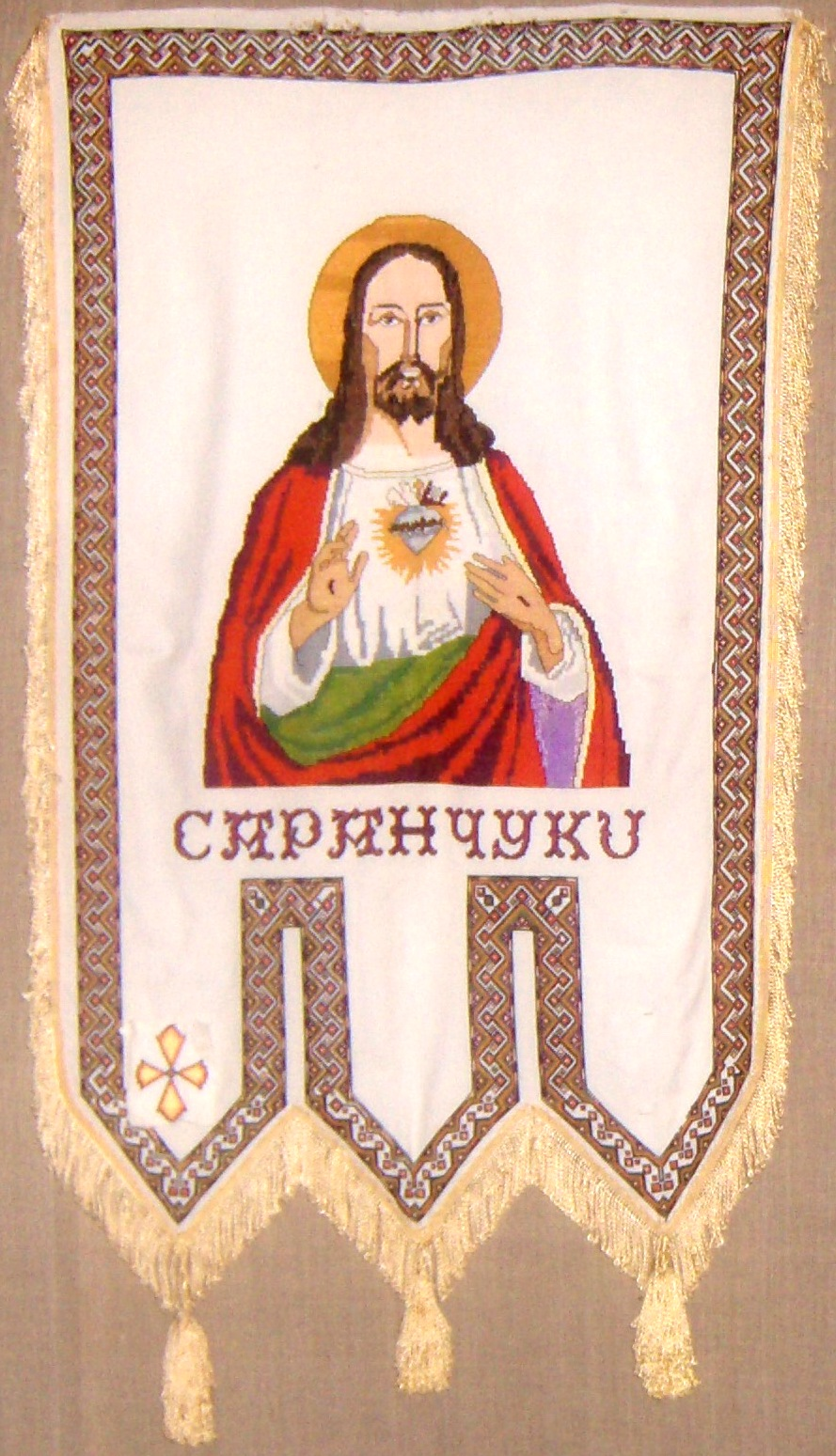
Church pennant of village Saranchuky, at museum in Berezhany

Saranchuky (Ukrainian: Саранчуки, Polish: Saranczuky, Saranczuki) is a village in Ternopil Raion of Ternopil Oblast in the western area of Ukraine, the historic region of Halychyna (Eastern Galicia). Saranchuky is located in a large, fertile valley plain of the Zolota Lypa River, about 15 km south of Berezhany. The name comes from the word "sarancha" (=Locust). Saranchuky hosts the administration of Saranchuky rural hromada, one of the hromadas of Ukraine.

Until 18 July 2020, Saranchuky belonged to Berezhany Raion. The raion was abolished in July 2020 as part of the administrative reform of Ukraine, which reduced the number of raions of Ternopil Oblast to three. The area of Berezhany Raion was merged into Ternopil Raion.

The Saranchuky area is very densely populated, and there are a few other villages virtually merged with it: Rybnyky, Potutory and Kotiv. The closest railroad station is in Potutory, and there is a small railway stop in Rybnyky. Many believe that Saranchuky used to be a Tatar settlement.

== Demographics ==
- Population in 1900: 2031 inhabitants (56 Jews)
- Population in 1939: 2970 (60 Jews)
- Present population: 1066 inhabitants (within Saranchuky village council) / 880 people in Saranchuky village proper (2007)

== Famous people ==
- Walter Klymkiw (1926–2000) was a Canadian chorus master, educator, and public figure of Ukrainian origin.
