= Sloviatyn =

Rural locality in Ternopil Oblast, Ukraine

Sloviatyn Слов'ятин
- Location in Ternopil Oblast
- Coordinates: 49°18′32″N 24°52′9″E
- Country: Ukraine
- Oblast: Ternopil Oblast
- Raion: Ternopil Raion
- Hromada: Saranchuky rural hromada
- Time zone: UTC+2 (EET)
  - Summer (DST): UTC+3 (EEST)
- Postal code: 47536

Sloviatyn (Ukrainian: Слов'ятин) is a village in Saranchuky rural hromada, Ternopil Raion, Ternopil Oblast, Ukraine.

== History ==
The first written mention of the village was in 1439.

After the liquidation of the Berezhany Raion on 19 July 2020, the village became part of the Ternopil Raion.

== Religion ==
- Saint Nicholas church with a bell tower (1714, wooden),
- Church of the Intercession (1997; architect Vasyl Zoryk).

== Sources ==
- (in Ukrainian) Коцій М., Мельничук Б., Слов'ятин // Ternopil Encyclopedic Dictionary: in 4 v. / editorial board: H. Yavorskyi and other, Ternopil: "Zbruch", 2008, V. 3: П—Я, S. 294. — ISBN 978-966-528-279-2.
- "Sławentyn". Geographical Dictionary of the Kingdom of Poland (in Polish). 10. Warszawa: Kasa im. Józefa Mianowskiego. 1889. p. 774.
