= Saints Borys and Hlib Church, Shumliany =

Church in Ternopil Oblast, Ukraine

Saints Borys and Hlib church
- Церква Святих Мучеників Бориса і Гліба
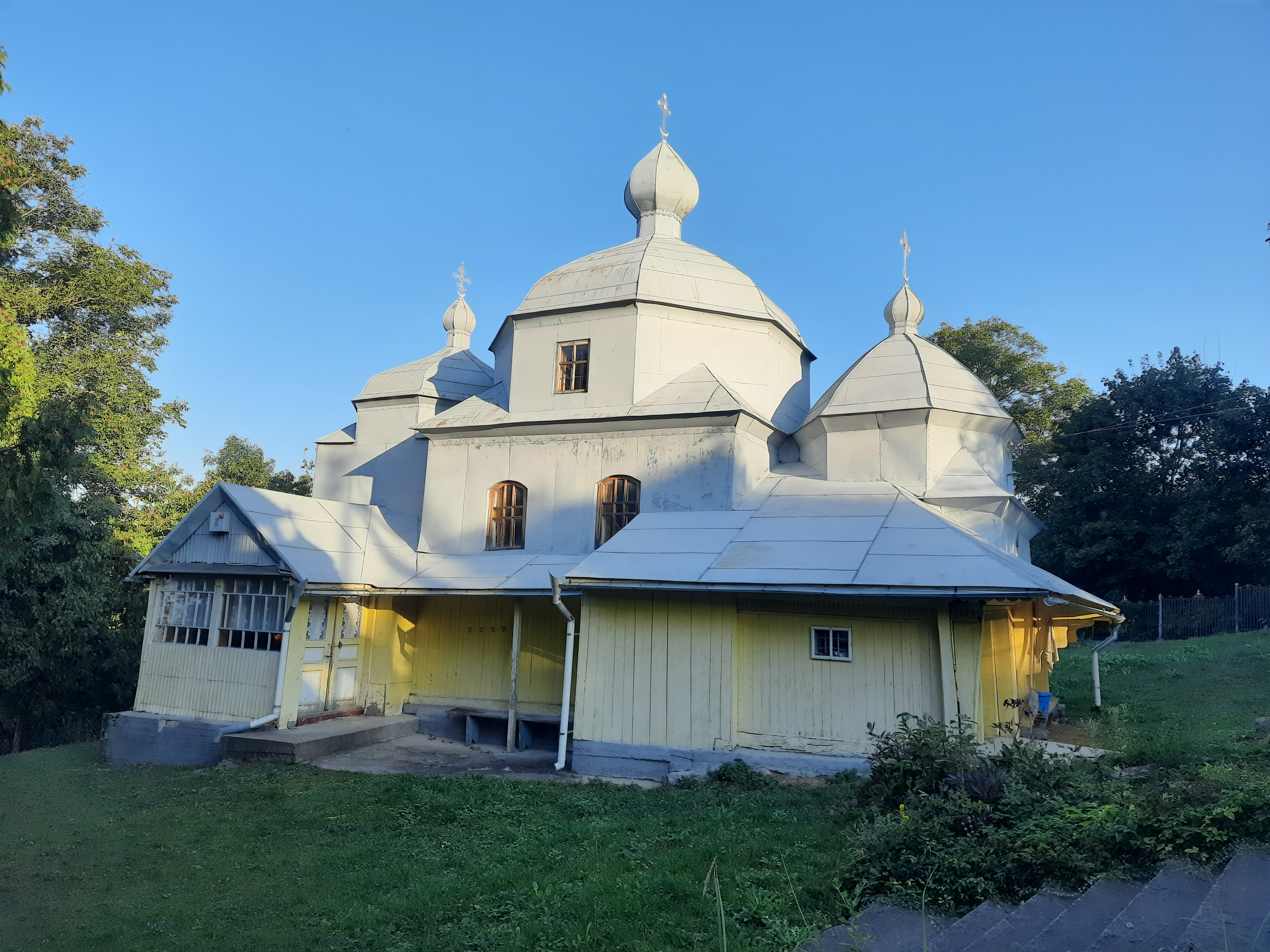
- Church of the OCU

Religion
- Affiliation: Orthodox Church of Ukraine

Location
- Location: Shumliany, Saranchuky rural hromada, Ternopil Raion, Ternopil Oblast, Ukraine
- Interactive map of Saints Borys and Hlib church
- Coordinates: 49°17′19″N 24°52′26″E

Architecture
- Completed: 1711

Immovable Monument of National Significance of Ukraine
- Official name: Церква та дзвінця (дер.) (Church and bell tower (wooden))
- Type: Architecture
- Reference no.: 190059

Saints Borys and Hlib Church (Ukrainian: Церква Святих Мучеників Бориса і Гліба) is a parish of the Ukrainian Orthodox Church in Shumliany, Saranchuky rural hromada, Ternopil Raion, Ternopil Oblast, Ukraine. It is an architectural monument of national significance.

== History ==
An ancient oak church stands on a picturesque hill in the village, built between 1696 and 1711, as evidenced by the numbers carved on a rafter. According to legends, there was once a male monastery near the village, and not far away, in the forest, there is a "Ksiondzova Krynytsia" (Priest's Well).

Next to the church stands a stone cross, which is the gravestone of Mrs. Shumlianska, the mother of the Lviv bishop Yosyf Shumlianskyi.

A sculpture of the Mother of God is located in the churchyard, erected in 1924.

Various church rituals are held here, such as the blessing of water, Easter baskets, and vegetables on Spas. Young people gather to dance in circles and sing traditional haivky songs.

An old custom exists in the village: on Good Friday night, fires are lit near the church.

== Priests ==
- Yoachhym
- Yanovych
- Hryhorii Levytskyi (1828–1855)
- Mykola Rybak (1856–1900)
- Lev Hrynevych (1901–1911)
- Petro Sterniuk (1911–1914)
- Yulian Dudkevych (1914–1924)
- Kornelii Kupetskyi (1924–1931)
- Mykola Starukh (1931–1940)
- Ivan Didukh (1940–1945)
- Petro Babuniak (1945–1947)
- Petro Seneta (1947–1949)
- Romylo Bohdanets (1949–1952)
- Ivan Voloshyn (1953–1966)
- Myron Martseliuk (1966–1969)
- Ivan Hura (1970–1971)
- Ivan Shevchuk (1972–1979)
- Ivan Yavorskyi (1979–1982)
- Vasyl Hanyshevskyi (1982–1984)
- Petro Fedav (1984–1985)
- Stepan Bilchuk (1985–1994)
- Yurii Terliuk (1994–1995)
- Petro Myskiv (November 1996–?)
- Volodymyr Punka (incumbent)

== Sources ==
- (in Ukrainian) С. Колодницький, У. Коропецька, Б. Мельничук, Шумляни // Ternopil Oblast. History of cities and villages: in 3 v. / Ternopil: "Terno-graph", 2014, V. 3: М—Ш, S. 202–204. — ISBN 978-966-457-246-7.
- "Шумляни". Дерев'яні церкви Західної України. Archived from the original on 2022-05-13.
