= Kuty, Ternopil Oblast =

Rural locality in Ukraine

Kuty Кути
- Location in Ternopil Oblast
- Coordinates: 49°22′55″N 24°52′05″E
- Country: Ukraine
- Oblast: Ternopil Oblast
- Raion: Ternopil Raion

Population (2003)
  - Total: 155
- Time zone: UTC+2 (EET)
  - Summer (DST): UTC+3 (EEST)
- Area code: +380 3548

Kuty (Ukrainian: Кути) is a village in Ternopil Raion of Ternopil Oblast, Ukraine. It belongs to Saranchuky rural hromada, one of the hromadas of Ukraine.

Until 18 July 2020, Kuty belonged to Berezhany Raion. The raion was abolished in July 2020 as part of the administrative reform of Ukraine, which reduced the number of raions of Ternopil Oblast to three. The area of Berezhany Raion was merged into Ternopil Raion.

== Population ==
- Population in 2003: 155 inhabitants with over 105 houses.
