= Molokhiv =

Rural locality in Ternopil Oblast, Ukraine

Molokhiv Молохів
- Location in Ternopil Oblast
- Coordinates: 49°21′15″N 24°53′30″E
- Country: Ukraine
- Oblast: Ternopil Oblast
- Raion: Ternopil Raion
- Hromada: Saranchuky rural hromada
- Time zone: UTC+2 (EET)
  - Summer (DST): UTC+3 (EEST)
- Postal code: 47531

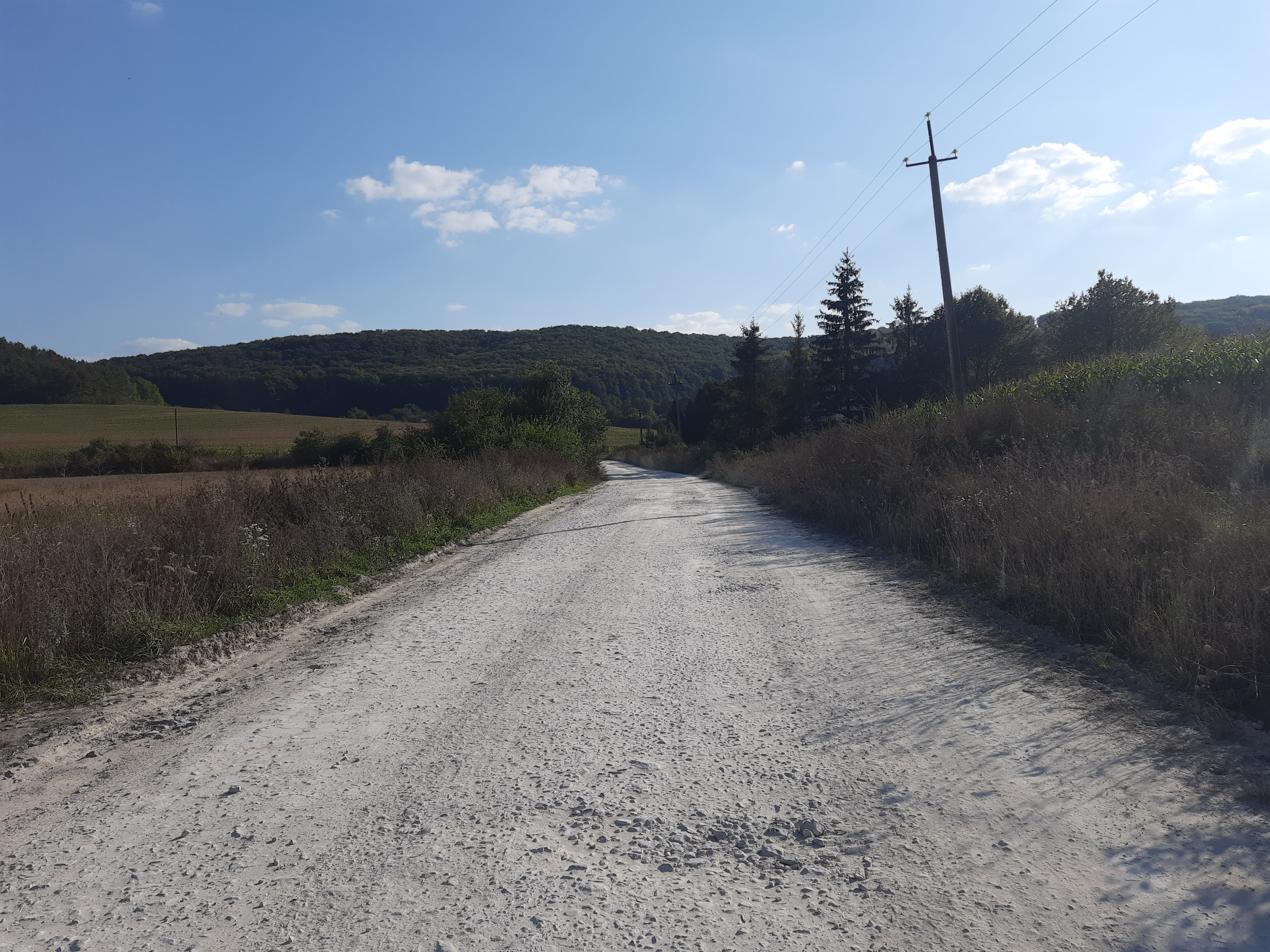

Molokhiv (Ukrainian: Молохів) is a village in Saranchuky rural hromada, Ternopil Raion, Ternopil Oblast, Ukraine.

== History ==
The village is known to have had a distillery in the 1880s.

After the liquidation of the Berezhany Raion on 19 July 2020, the village became part of the Ternopil Raion.

== Religion ==
- Church of the Assumption (1992, brick).

== Sources ==
- (in Ukrainian) Гнатишин В., Молохів // Ternopil Encyclopedic Dictionary: in 4 v. / editorial board: H. Yavorskyi and other, Ternopil: "Zbruch", 2005, V. 2: К—О, S. 552. — ISBN 966-528-199-2.
- "Mołochów". Geographical Dictionary of the Kingdom of Poland (in Polish). 6. Warszawa: Kasa im. Józefa Mianowskiego. 1885. p. 645.
