= Litiatyn =

Rural locality in Ternopil Oblast, Ukraine

Litiatyn Літятин
- Location in Ternopil Oblast
- Coordinates: 49°23′4″N 25°3′12″E
- Country: Ukraine
- Oblast: Ternopil Oblast
- Raion: Ternopil Raion
- Hromada: Saranchuky rural hromada
- Time zone: UTC+2 (EET)
  - Summer (DST): UTC+3 (EEST)
- Postal code: 47530

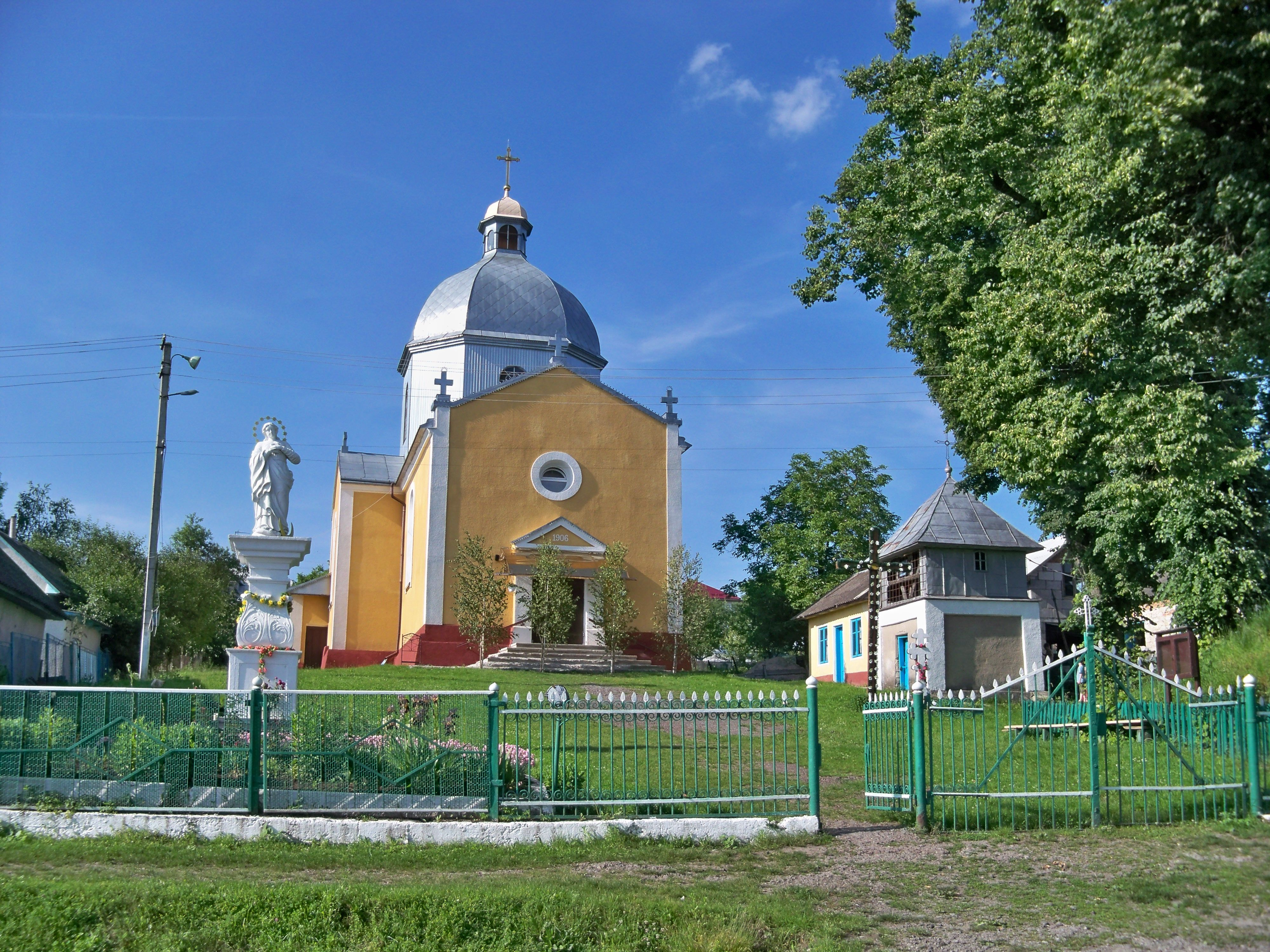
Church of St. Great Martyr Demetrius, village of Litiatyn

Litiatyn (Ukrainian: Літятин) is a village in Saranchuky rural hromada, Ternopil Raion, Ternopil Oblast, Ukraine.

== History ==
The first written mention of the village was in 1443.

After the liquidation of the Berezhany Raion on 19 July 2020, the village became part of the Ternopil Raion.

== Religion ==
- Saint Demetrius church (1906, built),
- Roman Catholic Church (1888, not functioning).

== Sources ==
- (in Ukrainian) Ковальков Ю., Туркевич О., Літятин // Ternopil Encyclopedic Dictionary: in 4 v. / editorial board: H. Yavorskyi and other, Ternopil: "Zbruch", 2005, V. 2: К—О, S. 381—382. — ISBN 966-528-199-2.
- "Litiatyn". Geographical Dictionary of the Kingdom of Poland (in Polish). 5. Warszawa: Kasa im. Józefa Mianowskiego. 1884. p. 328.
