= Voloshchyna, Ternopil Oblast =

Rural locality in Ternopil Oblast, Ukraine

Voloshchyna Волощина
- Location in Ternopil Oblast
- Coordinates: 49°18′40″N 25°0′35″E
- Country: Ukraine
- Oblast: Ternopil Oblast
- Raion: Ternopil Raion
- Hromada: Saranchuky rural hromada
- Time zone: UTC+2 (EET)
  - Summer (DST): UTC+3 (EEST)
- Postal code: 47535

Voloshchyna (Ukrainian: Волощина) is a village in Saranchuky rural hromada, Ternopil Raion, Ternopil Oblast, Ukraine.

== History ==
The first written mention of the village was in 1420.

After the liquidation of the Berezhany Raion on 19 July 2020, the village became part of the Ternopil Raion.

== Religion ==
Two churches: the Church of the Laying of the Robe of the Blessed Virgin Mary (1826, wooden) and St. Paraskevia (2005, brick).

== Sources ==
- (in Ukrainian) Дем'янова І., Волощина // Ternopil Encyclopedic Dictionary: in 4 v. / editorial board: H. Yavorskyi and other, Ternopil: "Zbruch", 2004, V. 1: А—Й, S. 302. — ISBN 966-528-197-6.
- "Wołoszczyzna (pow. podhajecki)". Geographical Dictionary of the Kingdom of Poland (in Polish). 13. Warszawa: Kasa im. Józefa Mianowskiego. 1893. p. 897.
