= Mechyshchiv =

Rural locality in Ternopil Oblast, Ukraine

Mechyshchiv Мечищів
- Location in Ternopil Oblast
- Coordinates: 49°22′13″N 24°52′29″E
- Country: Ukraine
- Oblast: Ternopil Oblast
- Raion: Ternopil Raion
- Hromada: Saranchuky rural hromada
- Time zone: UTC+2 (EET)
  - Summer (DST): UTC+3 (EEST)
- Postal code: 47535

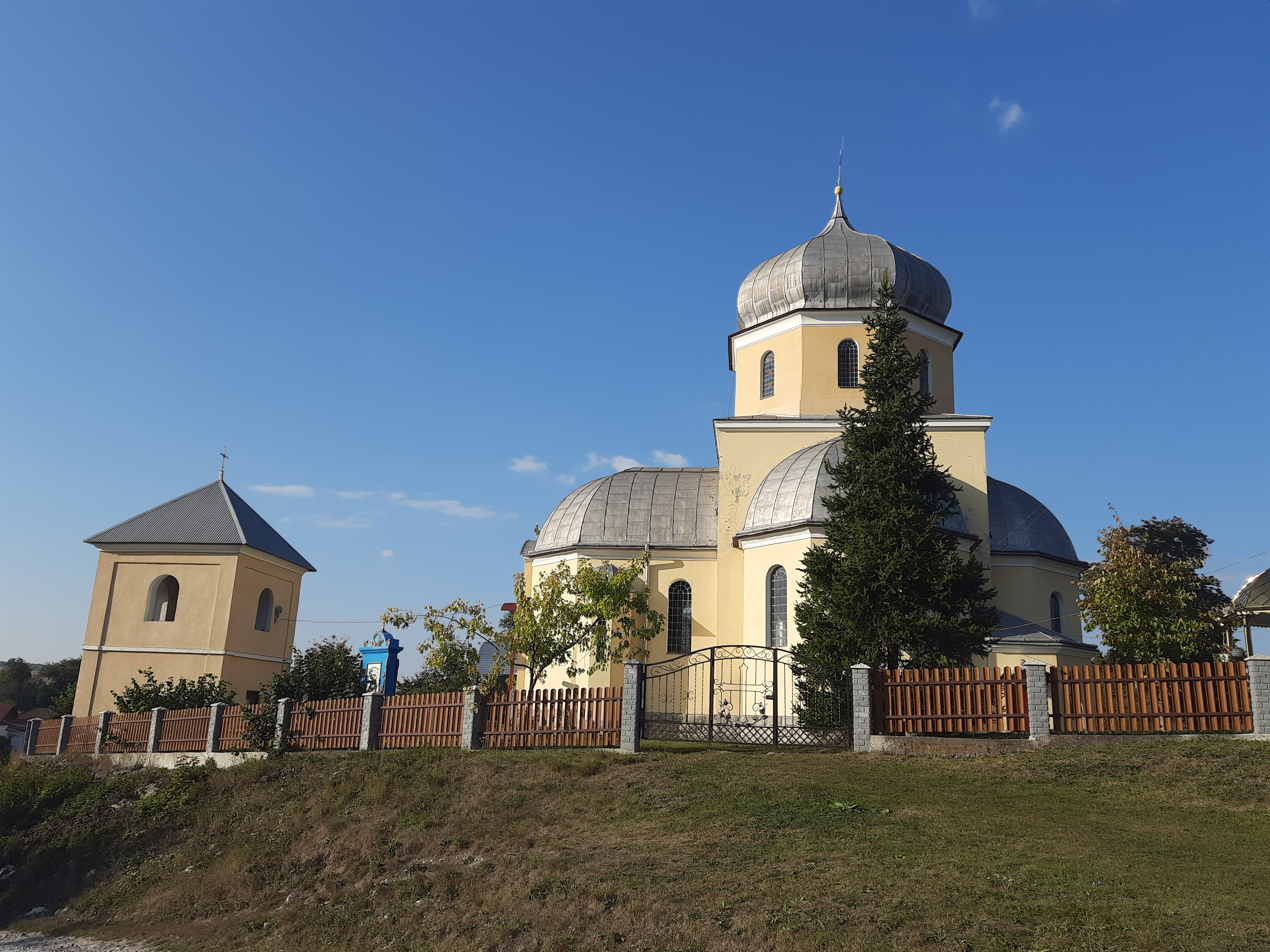

Mechyshchiv (Ukrainian: Мечищів) is a village in Saranchuky rural hromada, Ternopil Raion, Ternopil Oblast, Ukraine.

== History ==
The first written mention of the village was in 1438.

After the liquidation of the Berezhany Raion on 19 July 2020, the village became part of the Ternopil Raion.

== Religion ==
- St. Nicholas church (1928, brick).

== Sources ==
- (in Ukrainian) Климко Б., Ханас В., Мечищів // Ternopil Encyclopedic Dictionary: in 4 v. / editorial board: H. Yavorskyi and other, Ternopil: "Zbruch", 2005, V. 2: К—О, S. 506. — ISBN 966-528-199-2.
- "Mieczyszczów". Geographical Dictionary of the Kingdom of Poland (in Polish). 6. Warszawa: Kasa im. Józefa Mianowskiego. 1885. p. 328.
