= Baznykivka =

Rural locality in Ternopil Oblast, Ukraine

Baznykivka Базниківка
- Location within Ukraine
- Coordinates: 49°20′56″N 25°01′44″E
- Country: Ukraine
- Oblast: Ternopil Oblast
- Raion: Ternopil Raion

Area
  - Total: 3.83 km^{2} (1.48 sq mi)

Population (2014 census)
  - Total: 85
  - Density: 302.8/km^{2} (784/sq mi)
- Time zone: UTC+2 (EET)
  - Summer (DST): UTC+3 (EEST)
- Postal code: 47533
- Area code: +380 3548

Baznykivka (Ukrainian: Базниківка, Polish: Baźnikówka) is a village in Ternopil Raion of Ternopil Oblast, Ukraine. It belongs to Saranchuky rural hromada, one of the hromadas of Ukraine.

Until 18 July 2020, Baznykivka belonged to Berezhany Raion. The raion was abolished in July 2020 as part of the administrative reform of Ukraine, which reduced the number of raions of Ternopil Oblast to three. The area of Berezhany Raion was merged into Ternopil Raion.

== Etymology ==
The name Baznykivka originates from the local Ukrainian dialect word "базник" (Romanised:"baznyk"), which means "elder." It is believed that the name was given to the village due to the presence of a respected elder in the community who held a significant position of authority and influence.

Another version of the etymology of the name Baznykivka suggests that it was named after a fugitive from Moravia who was named Baznyk. This individual may have sought refuge in the village and become an influential figure in the community, leading to the naming of the village after him.

== History ==
According to a legend, the settlement was founded in the 10th-11th centuries and was destroyed by the Tatars in the 13th century. Burials from the times of Kyivan Rus (12th-13th centuries) have been discovered on the territory of Baznikovka.

The village was first mentioned in documents from 1731 and by the 1880s, Stanislav Pototsky was the owner of the farm. During the 20th century, many of the residents of Baznikivka were involved in the Ukrainian resistance movement, including the USS Legion, UGA, Halychyna division, and the Ukrainian Insurgent Army (UPA). Many soldiers of the Organization of Ukrainian Nationalists (OUN) and UPA died in the village.

In the 1930s, the OUN "troika" was created in the village with the help of teacher Olena Skaskiv. By the end of 1939, the local branch of the OUN included a large number of members, and the village was the center of the OUN field command. During the German occupation, several residents volunteered for the Halychyna division and fought bravely. After the Second World War, some of the soldiers were sent to Western Ukraine and died in battle with the Enkavedists.

In 1952, the village underwent an administrative reform, and the previously separate hamlets of Hirovytsia and Sokolytsia were annexed to the village. For 30 years, every summer, a training and recreation camp named "Lysonya" after I. Gavdydy was held near the Sokolytsia farm, attended by plastuns from all over Ukraine and members of various Christian organizations.

From 1939 to 2017, the village was part of the Saranchukiv Village Council. As a result, it became part of the newly established Saranchukiv village community.

After the Berezhan district was dissolved on July 19, 2020, the village was incorporated into the Ternopil district

== Population ==
Historical population
Year	Pop.	±%
1952	244	—
2001	116	−52.5%
2014	85	−26.7%

=== Languages ===
The dialect spoken locally belongs to the southwestern branch of the Transnistrian dialect of the Ukrainian language.
