= Shumliany =

Shumliany Шумляни
- Village
- Interactive map of Shumliany
- Coordinates: 49°16′55″N 24°52′44″E
- Country: Ukraine
- Oblast: Ternopil Oblast
- Raion: Ternopil Raion
- Established: 1400

Area
  - Total: 22,006 km^{2} (8,497 sq mi)

Population
  - Total: 1,196
  - Density: 5,435/km^{2} (14,080/sq mi)
- Time zone: UTC+2
  - Summer (DST): UTC+3

Shumliany (Ukrainian: Шумляни, Polish: Szumlany) is a village in Ternopil Raion of Ternopil Oblast in western Ukraine. It belongs to Pidhaitsi urban hromada, one of the hromadas of Ukraine. The village belonged to Berezhany Raion before 1990. The population is 1,196.

== History ==
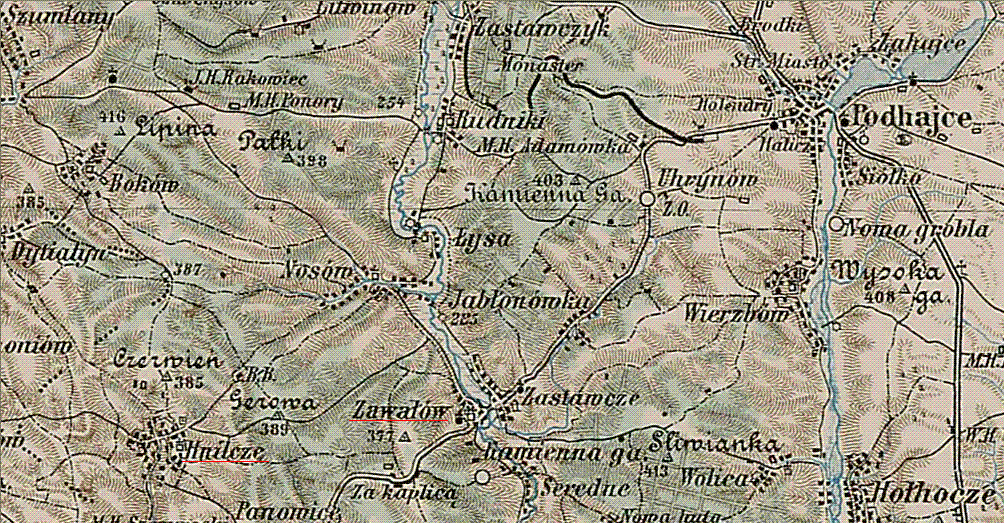
Shumliany on the map dated back to XVIII century

There was discovered archaeological sites from chalcolithic period.

The first written reference dates from 1467.

Until 18 July 2020, Shumliany belonged to Pidhaitsi Raion. The raion was abolished in July 2020 as part of the administrative reform of Ukraine, which reduced the number of raions of Ternopil Oblast to three. The area of Pidhaitsi Raion was merged into Ternopil Raion.

== Attractions ==
There are two churches in Shumliany: St. Borys and Hlib (1701) and St. Volodymyr (1993).

It was built memorial crosses dedicated in abolition of serfdom, fighters for the freedom of Ukraine (1990), in honor of the 1000th anniversary of Rus baptism and in honor of the 47th anniversary of the last battle of UPA against NKGB (2007).

== Notable people ==
- Munio Weinraub, Israeli architect
