= Vilkhovets, Ternopil Raion, Ternopil Oblast =

Rural locality in Ternopil Oblast, Ukraine

Vilkhovets Вільховець
- Location in Ternopil Oblast
- Coordinates: 49°24′25″N 24°55′33″E
- Country: Ukraine
- Oblast: Ternopil Oblast
- Raion: Ternopil Raion

Population (2003)
  - Total: 740 (2,003)
- Time zone: UTC+2 (EET)
  - Summer (DST): UTC+3 (EEST)
- Postal code: 47531
- Area code: +380 3548

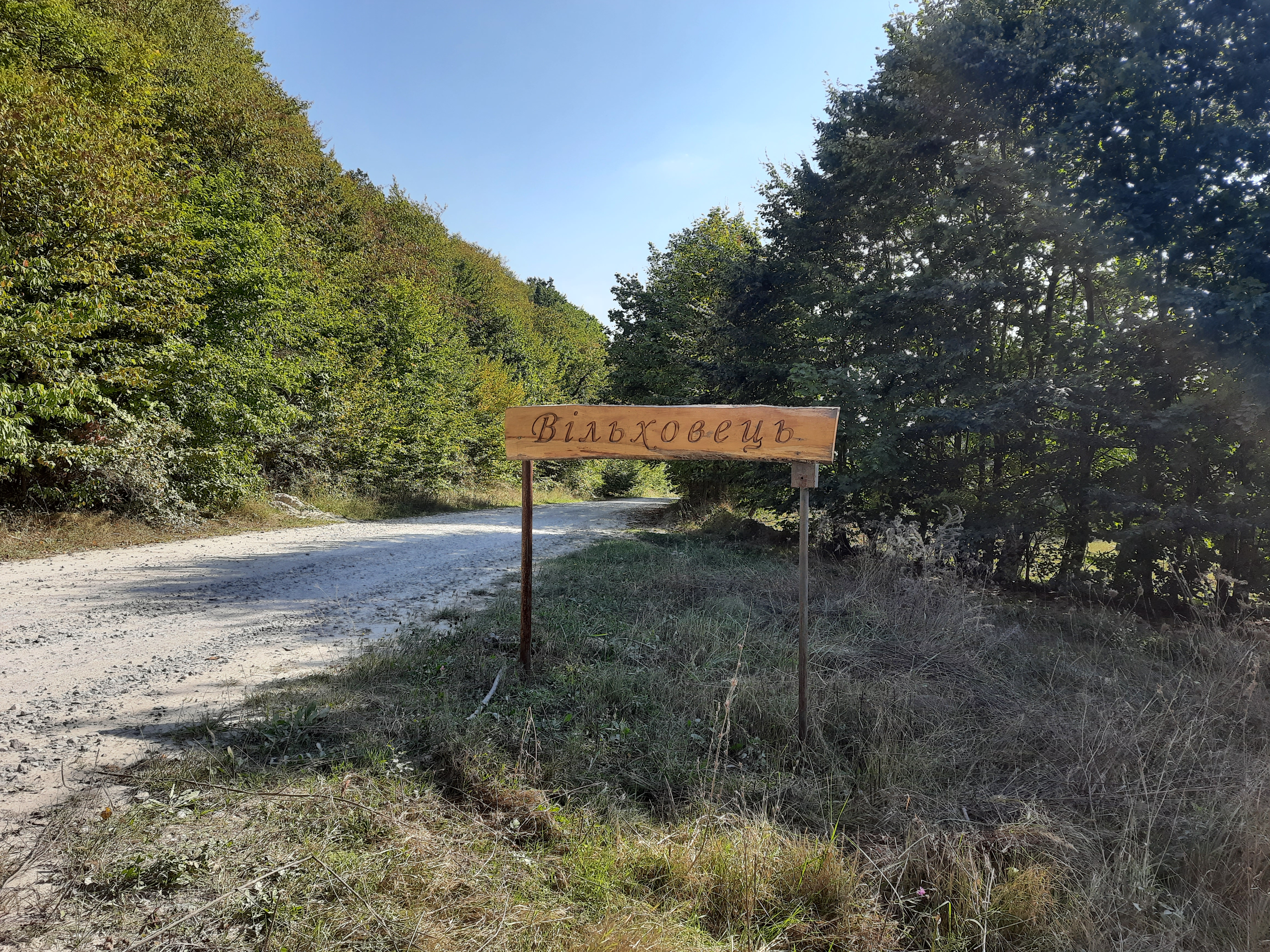
Sign at the entrance to the village of Vilkhovets.

Vilkhovets (Ukrainian: Вільховець) is a village in Ternopil Raion of Ternopil Oblast, Ukraine. It belongs to Saranchuky rural hromada, one of the hromadas of Ukraine.

Until 18 July 2020, Vilkhovets belonged to Berezhany Raion. The raion was abolished in July 2020 as part of the administrative reform of Ukraine, which reduced the number of raions of Ternopil Oblast to three. The area of Berezhany Raion was merged into Ternopil Raion.

== Population ==
- Population in 2003: 740 inhabitants with over 194 houses.

== Sources ==
- (in Ukrainian) В. Лашта, Г. Фанго, Вільховець // Ternopil Encyclopedic Dictionary: in 4 v. / editorial board: H. Yavorskyi and other, Ternopil: "Zbruch", 2004, V. 1: А—Й, S. 281. — ISBN 966-528-197-6.
