= Bozhykiv =

Rural locality in Ternopil Oblast, Ukraine

Bozhykiv Божиків
- Interactive map of Bozhykiv
- Coordinates: 49°19′00″N 24°59′20″E
- Country: Ukraine
- Oblast: Ternopil Oblast
- Raion: Ternopil Raion
- Time zone: UTC+2 (EET)
  - Summer (DST): UTC+3 (EEST)
- Postal code: 47535
- Area code: +380 3548

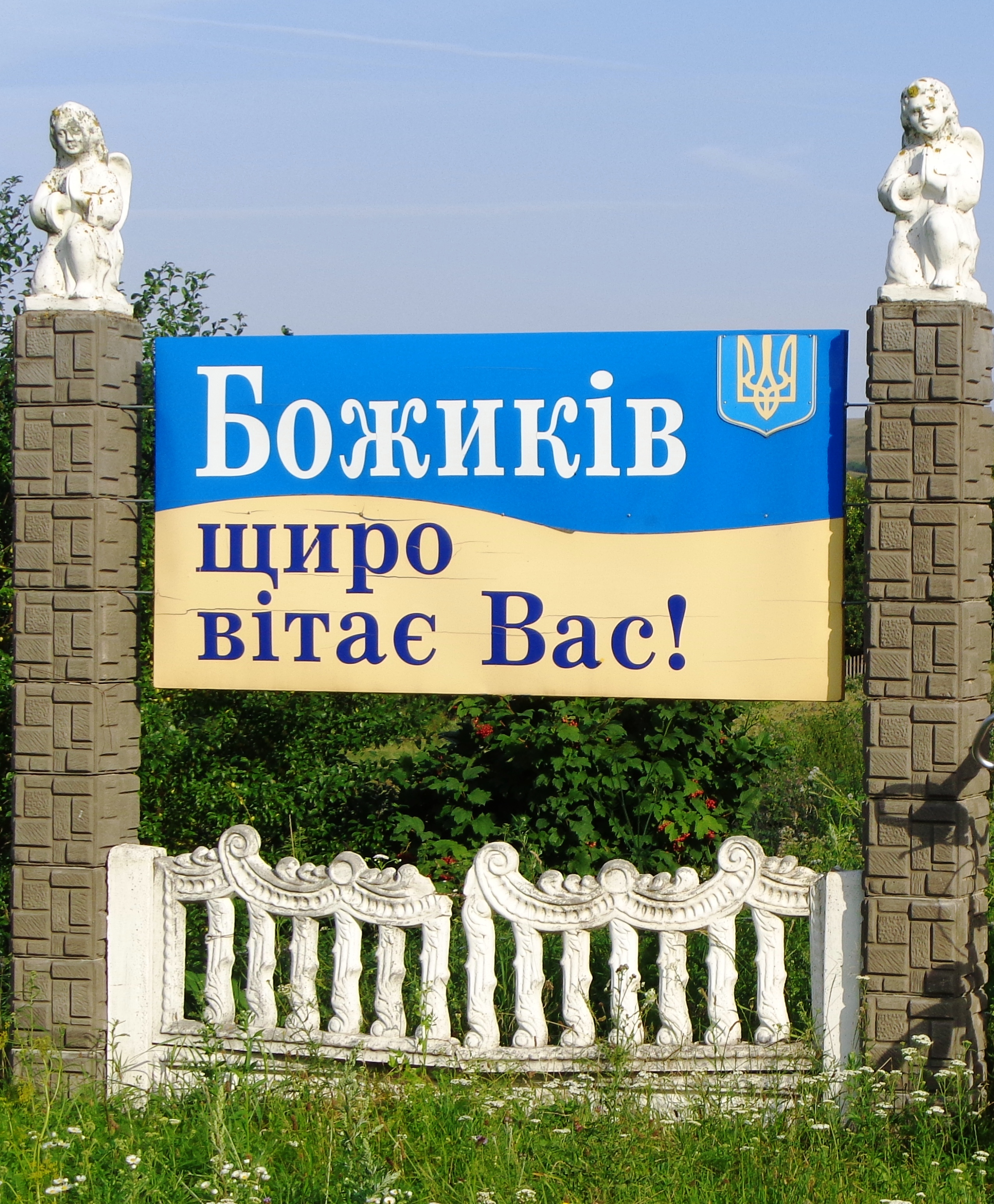
Welcome in Bozhykiv

Bozhykiv (Ukrainian: Божиків, Polish: Bożyków) is a village in Ternopil Raion of Ternopil Oblast of western Ukraine. It belongs to Saranchuky rural hromada, one of the hromadas of Ukraine.

Until 18 July 2020, Bozhykiv belonged to Berezhany Raion. The raion was abolished in July 2020 as part of the administrative reform of Ukraine, which reduced the number of raions of Ternopil Oblast to three. The area of Berezhany Raion was merged into Ternopil Raion.

== Population ==
- Population in 2001: 670 inhabitants with over 241 houses.
- Population in 2014: 528 inhabitants.
