= Rybnyky =

Rural locality in Ternopil Oblast, Ukraine

Rybnyky Рибники
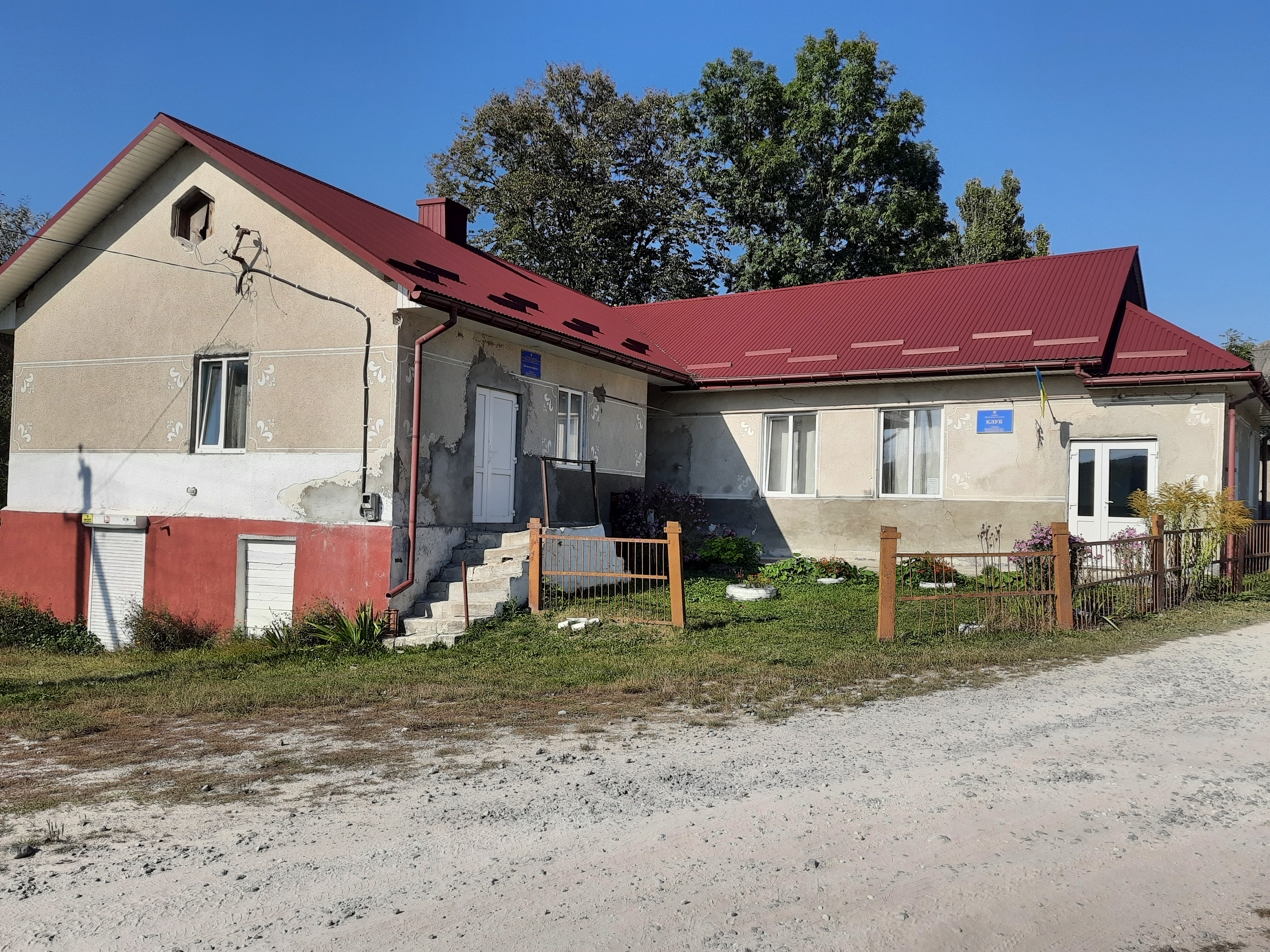
- Rybnyky

- Location in Ternopil Oblast
- Coordinates: 49°22′9″N 24°58′8″E
- Country: Ukraine
- Oblast: Ternopil Oblast
- Raion: Ternopil Raion
- Hromada: Saranchuky rural hromada
- Time zone: UTC+2 (EET)
  - Summer (DST): UTC+3 (EEST)
- Postal code: 47531

Rybnyky (Ukrainian: Рибники) is a village in Saranchuky rural hromada, Ternopil Raion, Ternopil Oblast, Ukraine.

== History ==
The first written mention of the village was in 1772.

After the liquidation of the Berezhany Raion on 19 July 2020, the village became part of the Ternopil Raion.

== Religion ==
- Two churches of the Nativity of the Blessed Virgin Mary (1881, OCU; 1997, UGCC).

== Sources ==
- (in Ukrainian) Бойко М., Рибники // Ternopil Encyclopedic Dictionary: in 4 v. / editorial board: H. Yavorskyi and other, Ternopil: "Zbruch", 2008, V. 3: П—Я, S. 178. — ISBN 978-966-528-279-2.
- "Rybniki (pow. brzeżański)". Geographical Dictionary of the Kingdom of Poland (in Polish). 10. Warszawa: Kasa im. Józefa Mianowskiego. 1889. p. 64.
