= Shybalyn =

Rural locality in Ternopil Oblast, Ukraine

Coordinates: 49°27′N 25°00′E

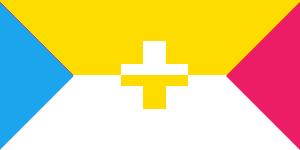
Flag of the village Shybalyn

Shybalyn (Ukrainian: Шибалин, English: Shybalyn, Polish: Szybalyn, Russian: Шыбалын) is a large village of 1359 people in Ternopil Raion of Ternopil Oblast, Ukraine. It belongs to Berezhany urban hromada, one of the hromadas of Ukraine. Shybalyn is a major village 10 km east of Berezhany on the Berezhany-Kozova-Ternopil highway.

Until 18 July 2020, Shybalyn belonged to Berezhany Raion and was the second largest village in the raion (behind Naraiv). The raion was abolished in July 2020 as part of the administrative reform of Ukraine, which reduced the number of raions of Ternopil Oblast to three. The area of Berezhany Raion was merged into Ternopil Raion.

It is one of the oldest villages in the area. The name comes from the Ukrainian/Polish word "shyba," window-glass. The first historic mention of the village dates to 1451. Shybalyn lays within the historic region of Halychyna, in the western part of Podillya Upland. Shybalyn is situated along the deep valley of river Tsenivka (tributary of Zolota Lypa) with high hills on both sides. There is a state botanical reserve nearby the village.

Highway Stryi - Kropyvnytckyi runs through the village. There are numerous bus routes that connect Rohatyn, Berezhany and Ternopil that stop in the village.

There are Ukrainian Greek-Catholic church of St. Yuri, The Orthodox Church of St. John the Divine and The old Polish Roman Catholic Church of Our Lady is in delipidated condition.

== Population ==
- Population in 1900: 1981 inhabitants
- Population in 1939: 2410 inhabitants
- Population in 1991: 1359 inhabitants
- Population in 2007: 1293 inhabitants with over 400 houses
