= Kotiv, Ternopil Oblast =

Rural locality in Ternopil Oblast, Ukraine

Kotiv Котів
- Location in Ternopil Oblast Kotiv (Ternopil Oblast)
- Coordinates: 49°21′12″N 24°58′22″E
- Country: Ukraine
- Oblast: Ternopil Oblast
- Raion: Ternopil Raion

Population (2001)
  - Total: 531
- Time zone: UTC+2 (EET)
  - Summer (DST): UTC+3 (EEST)
- Postal code: 47531
- Area code: +380 3548

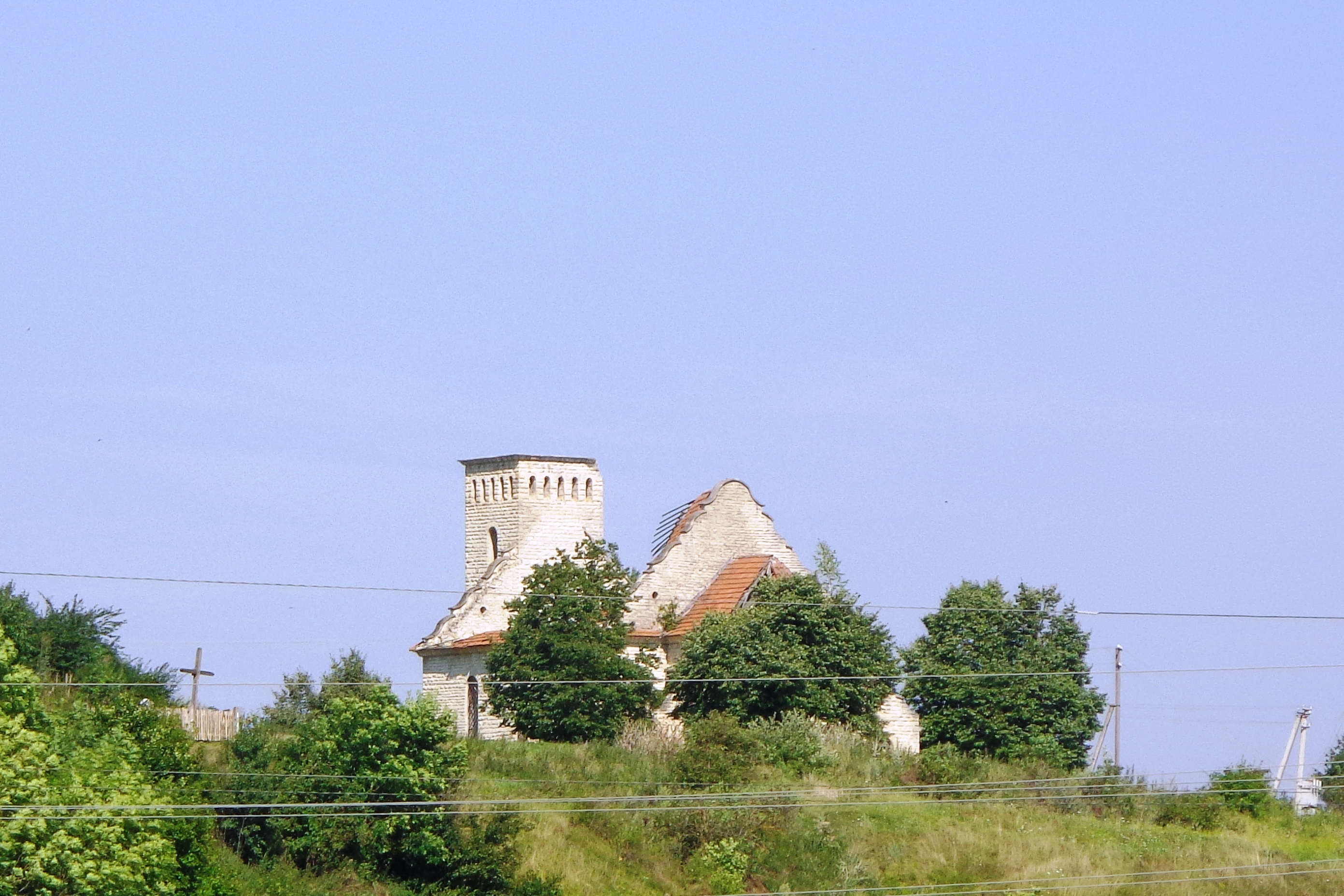
Church ruins in kotiv

Kotiv (Ukrainian: Котів) is a village in Ternopil Raion of Ternopil Oblast, Ukraine. It belongs to Saranchuky rural hromada, one of the hromadas of Ukraine.

Until 18 July 2020, Kotiv belonged to Berezhany Raion. The raion was abolished in July 2020 as part of the administrative reform of Ukraine, which reduced the number of raions of Ternopil Oblast to three. The area of Berezhany Raion was merged into Ternopil Raion.

== Population ==
- Population in 2001: 531 inhabitants.

== Sources ==
- (in Ukrainian) В. Уніят, Б. Хаварівський., Котів // Ternopil Encyclopedic Dictionary: in 4 v. / editorial board: H. Yavorskyi and other, Ternopil: "Zbruch", 2005, V. 2: К—О, S. 201. — ISBN 966-528-199-2.
