= Saranchuky rural hromada =

Rural hromada in Ternopil Oblast, Ukraine

Saranchuky rural hromada Саранчуківська сільська громада
- hromada
- Location within Ternopil Oblast Location within Ukraine
- Coordinates: 49°21′6″N 24°59′15″E
- Country: Ukraine
- Oblast: Ternopil Oblast
- Raion: Ternopil Raion
- Administrative center: Saranchuky

Government
  - Hromada head: Volodymyr Pertrovskyi

Area
  - Total: 223.0 km^{2} (86.1 sq mi)

Population (2022)
  - Total: 6,308
- Villages: 19
- Website: saranchukivska-gromada.gov.ua

Saranchuky rural territorial hromada (Ukrainian: Саранчуківська територіальна громада, romanized: Saranchukivska silska terytorialna hromada) is a hromada in Ukraine, in Ternopil Raion of Ternopil Oblast. The administrative center is the village of Saranchuky. Its population is 6,308 (2022 estimate) Established on 10 August 2017.

== Settlements ==
The hromada consists of 19 villages:

- Baznykivka
- Bozhykiv
- Vilkhovets
- Voloshchyna
- Dibrova
- Kvitkove
- Kotiv
- Kuty
- Litiatyn
- Mechyshchiv
- Molokhiv
- Nadorozhniv
- Nova Hreblia
- Rybnyky
- Saranchuky
- Sloviatyn
- Trostianets
- Chervone
- Shumliany
