= Dibrova, Zbarazh urban hromada, Ternopil Raion, Ternopil Oblast =

Rural locality in Ternopil Oblast, Ukraine

Dibrova Діброва
- Location in Ternopil Oblast
- Coordinates: 49°40′59″N 25°56′32″E
- Country: Ukraine
- Oblast: Ternopil Oblast
- Raion: Ternopil Raion
- Hromada: Zbarazh urban hromada
- Time zone: UTC+2 (EET)
  - Summer (DST): UTC+3 (EEST)
- Postal code: 47360
- Area code: +380 3550

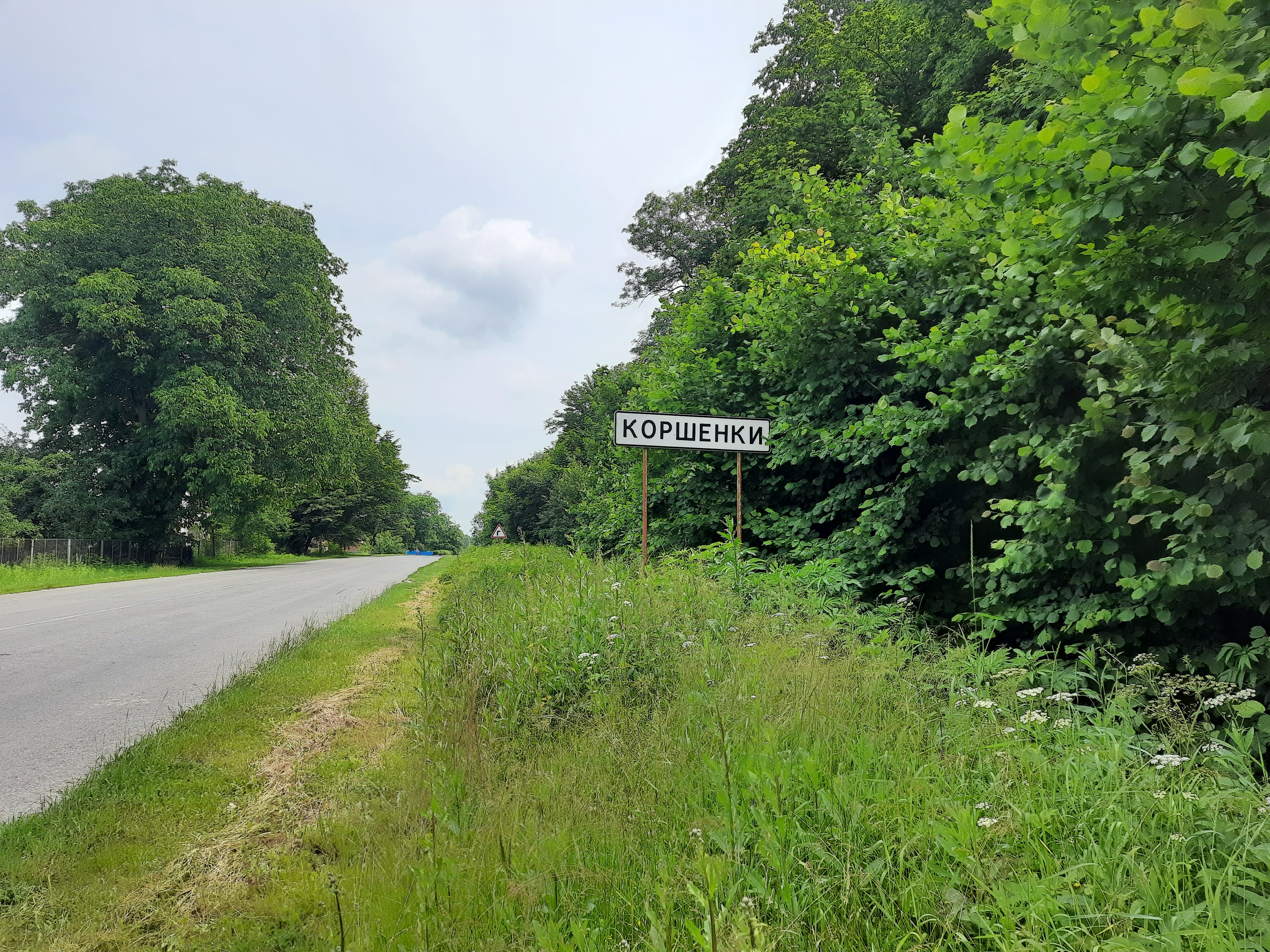
Entrance sign for Dibrova, Ternopil Oblast.

Dibrova (Ukrainian: Діброва) is a village in Ternopil Raion of Ternopil Oblast, Ukraine. It belongs to Zbarazh urban hromada, one of the hromadas of Ukraine.

Until 18 July 2020, Dibrova belonged to Zbarazh Raion. The raion was abolished in July 2020 as part of the administrative reform of Ukraine, which reduced the number of raions of Ternopil Oblast to three. The area of Zbarazh Raion was split between Kremenets and Ternopil Raions, with Dibrova being transferred to Ternopil Raion.
