= Berezhany Raion =

Former subdivision of Ternopil Oblast, Ukraine

Berezhany Raion Бережанський район
- Raion
- Flag Coat of arms

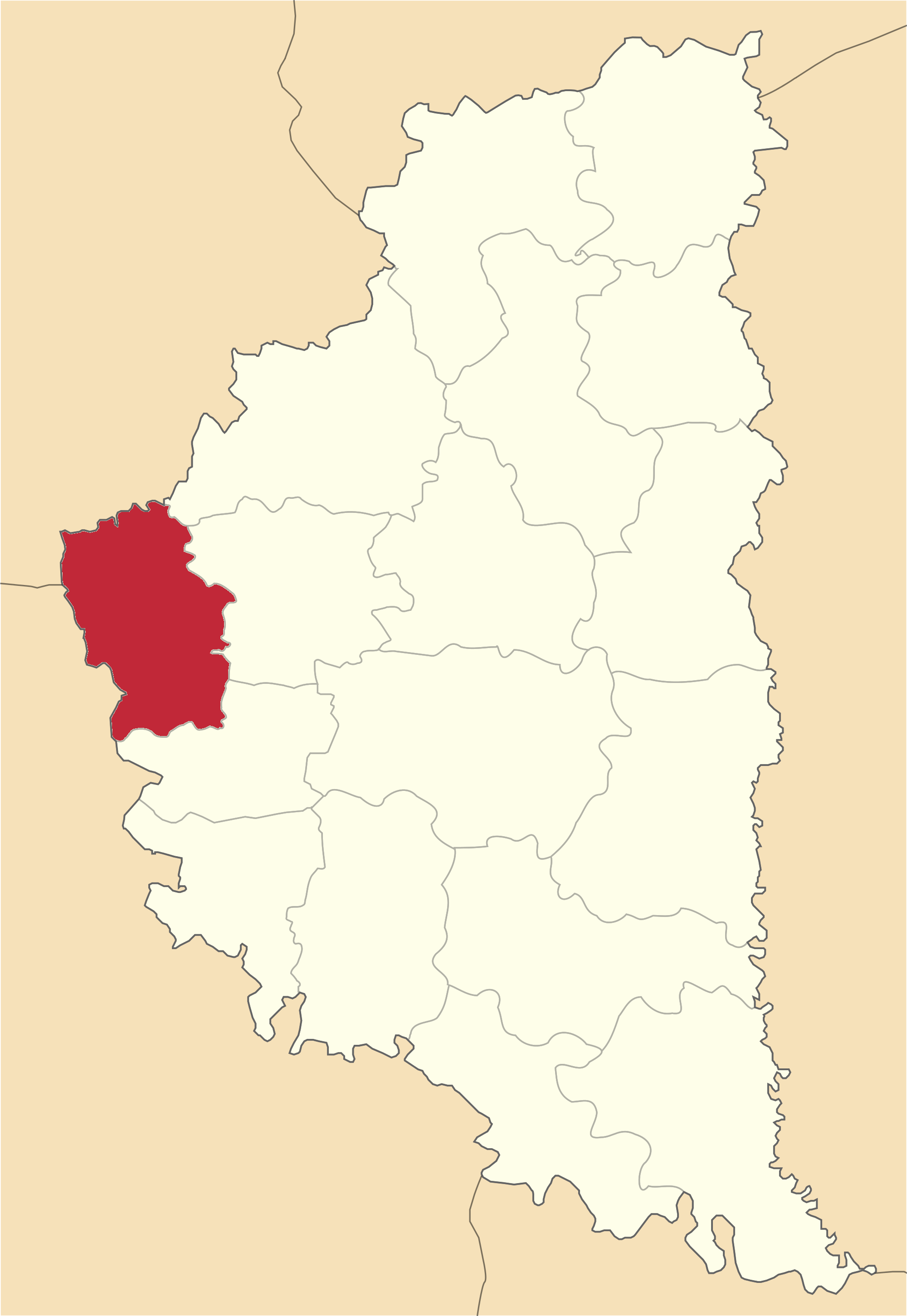
- Coordinates: 49°27′N 24°56′E
- Country: Ukraine
- Oblast: Ternopil Oblast
- Disestablished: 18 July 2020
- Admin. center: Berezhany
- Subdivisions: List: — city councils; — settlement councils; — rural councils; Number of localities: — cities; — urban-type settlements; 54 — villages; — rural settlements

Government
  - Governor: Roman Konstiantynovych Vysotskyi

Area
  - Total: 661 km^{2} (255 sq mi)

Population (2020)
  - Total: 20,453
  - Density: 30.9/km^{2} (80.1/sq mi)
- Time zone: UTC+02:00 (EET)
  - Summer (DST): UTC+03:00 (EEST)
- Area code: 380
- Website: Verkhovna Rada website

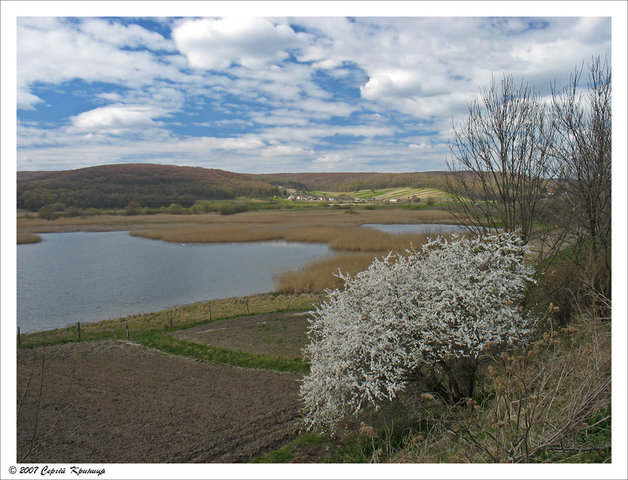
Village of Urman in Berezhany Raion, west Ukraine

Berezhany Raion (Ukrainian: Бережанський район) was a raion (district) in the westernmost corner of Ternopil Oblast (province) in western Ukraine, area traditionally known as Halychyna (Galicia). The administrative center was the city of Berezhany, some 50 kilometres (31 mi) away from Ternopil and 80 kilometres (50 mi) away from Lviv. Berezhany was separately incorporated as a city of oblast significance and did not belong to the raion. The Zolota Lypa river, a tributary of the Dniester tributary crossed the district from the north to the south. The river forms a large lake north of Berezhany. The raion was abolished on 18 July 2020 as part of the administrative reform of Ukraine, which reduced the number of raions of Ternopil Oblast to three. The area of Berezhany Raion was merged into Ternopil Raion. The last estimate of the raion population was 20,453 (2020 est.). The area of the raion was 661 cubic kilometres (159 cu mi). There were 54 villages and 1 town (Berezhany) in the raion.

At the time of disestablishment, the raion consisted of three hromadas:

- Berezhany urban hromada with the administration in Berezhany, also included Berezhany Municipality;
- Naraiv rural hromada with the administration in the selo of Naraiv;
- Saranchuky rural hromada with the administration in the selo of Saranchuky.

== Villages ==
There were the following villages in the raion (Ukrainian and Polish / Russian spellings are given):

Villages are ranked after size

- Naraiv (Нараїв / Narajów) - 1.799 inhabitants (river Narayivka flows through the village)
- Shybalyn (Шибалин / Szybalyn) - 1.359 inhabitants (first mention dates to 1451)
- Zhukiv (Жуків / Zuków) - 929 inhabitants
- Rohachyn (Рогачин / Rogachin) - 886 inhabitants
- Saranchuky (Саранчуки / Saranchuki) - 880 inhabitants
- Verbiv (Вербів / Werbów) - 865 inhabitants
- Kuryany (Куряни / Kuriany, Kurzany) - 831 inhabitants
- Vilkhovets (Вільховець / Olchowiec) - 765 inhabitants
- Bozhykiv (Божиків / Bozyków) - 670 inhabitants (village was known as Pryvitne in 1964–1991. First historical mention dates to 1443)
- Urman (Урмань) - 622 inhabitants
- Bishche (Біще / Biszcze) - 547 inhabitants (first historical mention dates to 1086)
- Poruchyn (Поручин / Poruczin) - 503 inhabitants
- Trostianets (Тростянець) - 428 inhabitants
- Rybnyky (Рибники / Rybniki) - 323 inhabitants
- Pidvysoke (Підвисоке / Podwysokie) - 317 inhabitants
- Baranivka (Баранівка / Baranówka) - 250 inhabitants
- Pavliv (Павлів / Pawlów) - 191 inhabitants (first mention dates to 1488)
- Baznykivka (Базниківка/Baznikówka) - 116 inhabitants (first historical mention dates to 1731)

== See also ==
- Subdivisions of Ukraine
