= Fortner Anderson =

American poet, performance artist

- Born: 1955 (age 70–71); Minneapolis, Minnesota, U.S.
- Occupations: Poet, performer
- Writing career
- Period: 2000s–present
- Notable works: Points of Departure, Annunciations, Solitary pleasures
- Website: www.fortneranderson.com

Fortner Anderson (born 1955) is an American-born poet, performance artist, and visual artist who has lived in Montreal, Quebec, since 1976. He is the author of several volumes of poetry and has published many audio recordings of his spoken word performances, and is known for innovative use of technology to present poetry readings.

== Early life ==
Anderson was born in Minneapolis, Minnesota.

== Career ==
In 1985, Anderson founded Dial-A-Poem Montreal, a free, 24-hour telephone hotline that users could call to hear a different poem each day, usually read by its author. About 150 poets contributed to the project, mostly from the Montreal area. On its first anniversary, the participants organized the “100 Poets" party, a gallery event which included eleven continuous hours of recorded audio and video poetry performance as well as live contributions from dozens of attending poets. Dial-A-Poem Montreal was inspired by a similar poetry hotline service operated by performance poet John Giorno in New York from 1968 to 1972, also called Dial-A-Poem.

In 1987, Anderson collaborated with writer Ian Ferrier and illustrator Phillip MacKenzie to publish The Heart of the Machine, an electronic interactive serial novel accessible through one of several information services that users would have to dial up from their computers.

In the 1990s Anderson and Ferrier began broadcasting recordings of poetry on the McGill University campus community radio station, CKUT-FM; the pair received a Standard Broadcasting Award for this innovation. Anderson continued to host a weekly radio program called "Dromotexte / Pirate Bloc Radio" on CKUT-FM, featuring spoken word and poetry recordings. He also served as the chair of CKUT's board of directors.

For a number of years Anderson worked as a business agent for the Directors Guild of Canada.

In 2007, he was awarded the La Voix Électrique / The Voice Electric prize for career achievement in poetry, an award presented in collaboration by two Montreal-based organizations, Les Filles électriques and Wired on Words.

In 2011, Anderson published a book of poetry, Solitary Pleasures, with designer Fabrizio Gilardino. Anderson's poem, mainly about activities and emotions in daily life, were rendered by Gilardino through creative typography followed by digital alteration. The book was accompanied by a CD of Anderson reading the poems. His 2012 release, Annunciations, a book with three audio CDs, was aired on campus and community radio.

Anderson's poetry has also been included in the anthologies Short Fuse: The Global Anthology of New Fusion Poetry and Poetry Nation: the North American anthology of fusion poetry, as well as in the literary periodical Estuaire.

In 2018 and 2019 he participates to the exhibition ‘Buveurs de quintessences’ curated by Caroline Andrieux that took place in Montreal at the Fonderie Darling and in Luxembourg City at the Casino Luxembourg.

== Works ==
- Sometimes I think, (1999, audio CD) with music by Alexandre Saint-Onge, Christopher Cauley, Alexander MacSween, and Sam Shalabi.
- Six Silk Purses (2005, audio CD)
- He sings (2006, audio CD)
- Solitary Pleasures (2011, poetry book + audio CD)
- Annunciations (2012, poetry book + 3 audio CD box set)
- Points of Departure (2017, poetry book)
