= Kelly Mark =

Canadian artist and sculptor

- Born: 1967; Welland, ON
- Died: February 21, 2025 (aged 57–58); Toronto, ON
- Known for: Conceptual Artist

Kelly Mark (1967 – 21 February 2025) was a Canadian conceptual artist and sculptor based in Toronto. Her work explored the mundane rituals of everyday life.

== Art practice ==
Mark was an artist who made conceptual artworks across a range of media. Formats included: sculptural installation, performance, video, photography, sound, neon, art multiples, mail art, wallpaper, Letraset and tattoos. A student of Gerald Ferguson at NSCAD, Mark's work has, as Robin Metcalfe notes, "an echo of Ferguson’s obsessive, process-oriented serial works of the early 1970s". Re-workings of conceptualist strategies, such as process and repetition, are a prominent feature of Mark's early art practice. In the Jar Series the artist fills mason jars with various white substances (White Jars, 1994), or black substances (Black Jars, 1996) and arranges them in a grid on the floor. Christina Ritchie, the curator of Mark's 1997 exhibition at the Art Gallery of Ontario writes, Mark's artworks often combine an emphasis on the formal characteristics of Minimalism with "personal, psychological expression." In the Until Drawings (1997), for instance, the artist makes a drawing "until the pencil runs out"; e.g., One Castell 9000 4B (1997) features deep gouges of thick graphite lines made in a repeating series covering the top half of a piece of paper. As Ritchie comments, in this aspect of her practice, Mark moves "into the realm of obsession and irresistible compulsion to order." An interest in "framing daily habits so they cross into the realm of art " is consistent throughout Mark's work. Object Carried for One Year (2003-2012) is a series of performances/sculptures consisting of an aluminum bar the artist carried in her pocket for an entire year. Mark's working class politics are evident in In and Out (1997-2032), a long term performance piece (ending when the artist dies or reaches retirement age 65) that requires the artist to punch an old-fashioned time clock. The piece has been owned by the Toronto art collector Dr. Paul Marks since 1999, "meaning that Mark, in effect, has a 'boss' who pays her on a yearly basis for the work". The artist's strategy of reframing the everyday is also evident in her use of TV as a sculptural material. Glow House (2005-2009) presents the temporary installation of 35-40 television sets turned to the same channel and distributed throughout a residential house. Animating the house with flickering light for those passing by in the night, Glow House was called "a true example of democratic public art " by Leslie Jen in Canadian Architect. Mark's video work, REM (2007), is compiled from more than 170 films and TV shows, to create a composite feature film that "meshes production and consumption into narrative hyper-time." REM is in the collection of the National Gallery of Canada.

=== I really should… ===
Mark's 48 minute sound work I really should…(2002) consists of the artist listing 1000 things she "really should do". A widely exhibited artwork, I really should… also is used as the vocals for "I Really" featuring Kelly Mark by the Dutch techno artist DJ Sandrien. The work is part of the permanent collection of the Morris and Helen Belkin Art Gallery and was exhibited in their 2018 exhibition Beginning with the Seventies: GLUT.

=== Letraset drawings ===
Since 2001, Mark had made drawings with Letraset, the dry transferable lettering format. Mark made her drawings by applying "countless dry transfer characters individually to matte board." Mark's abstract Letraset compositions "suggest an unseen source material such as aerial mapping, sewing patterns or convoluted text-based bar code". Mark's Letraset drawings have been used as source material for tattoos by a number of people. The Swedish funk/r&b band Dance Academy used one of Mark's Letraset drawings for the cover of their CD Boogietime.

== Publications ==
- "Still Life", Vancouver: Contemporary Art Gallery, 2010. ISBN 978-1-897302-42-2
- "Mediated", Riverside, CA: UCR: University of California at Riverside, 2009. ISBN 978-0-9823046-0-0
- "Liverpool AZ: Kelly Mark & Tenantspin", Liverpool: FACT, 2006. ISBN 1-84631-062-8 / ISBN 978-1-84631-062-1
- "Situation Comedy: Humor in Recent Art", NY: Independent Curators International (ICI), 2006. ISBN 0-916365-72-7
- "L'Envers des apparendes", Montreal: Mussee D'Art Contemporain, 2005. ISBN 2-551-22692-9
- "Canadian Heritage Collection: Primary Documents of 20th Century Canada", Rubicon, 2002. ISBN 0-921156-87-1
- "Kelly Mark", Hamilton Art Gallery/Hamilton Artists Inc/Contemporary Art Gallery, 2000. ISBN 0-919153-66-6
- "Everyday". Sydney: Biennale of Sydney, 1998. ISBN 0-7313-8924-7

== Exhibitions ==
- Morris and Helen Belkin Art Gallery, Vancouver, BC, "Beginning with the Seventies: GLUT", 2018
- MASS MoCA. North Adams, Massachusetts, "Oh Canada", 2012
- Fonderie Darling. Montreal, QC (Caroline Andrieux, Curator), "Public Disturbance", 2011
- DHC Art. Montreal, QC, "All in a Day's Work: 9 to 5", 2009
- Nuit Blanche, Toronto, Ontario (W. Baerwaldt, Curator), "Horroridor", 2008
- Justina M Barnicke Gallery, Hart House & Blackwood Gallery. Toronto, ON, "Stupid Heaven" (touring), 2007
- Liverpool Biennale (FACT), Liverpool, UK, "Liverpool Biennale", 2006
- Power Plant Contemporary Art Gallery. Toronto, ON, "Glow House #3", 2005
- Lisson Gallery. London, UK, "I Really Should" (S. Kalmar, Curator), 2005
- CAC de Basse-Normandie. St. Clair, FR, "18th Recontres Video Art Plastique", 2004
- IKON Gallery. Birmingham, UK, "Everything is Interesting", 2003

== Public collections ==
- Morris and Helen Belkin Art Gallery. Vancouver, BC
- Victoria & Albert Museum (Wallpaper Collection). London, UK
- The National Gallery of Canada. Ottawa, Ontario
- Art Gallery of Ontario. Toronto, Ontario
- Musee D'Art Contemporain. Montreal, Quebec
- Winnipeg Art Gallery. Winnipeg, Manitoba
- Art Gallery of Greater Victoria. British Columbia
- Agnes Etherington Art Gallery. Queens University, Kingston, Ontario
- Art Gallery of Nova Scotia. Halifax, Nova Scotia
- Mount Saint Vincent University Art Gallery. Halifax, Nova Scotia

A graduate of the Nova Scotia College of Art and Design (1994), Mark is represented by Olga Korper Gallery (Toronto).
