= Freie Berliner Kunstausstellung =

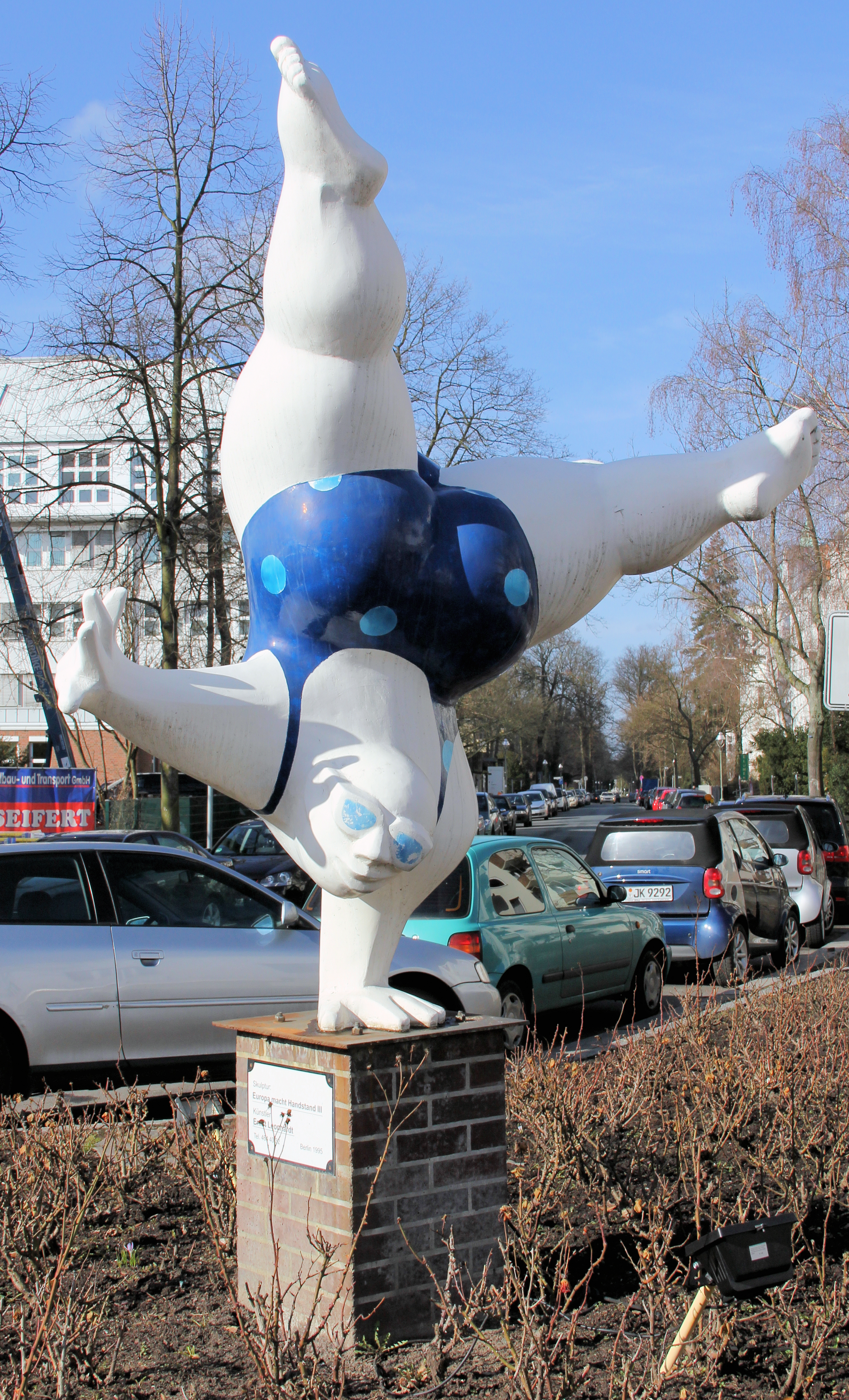
Sculpture of the long-time chairman of the FBK Ernst Leonhardt

The Freie Berliner Kunstausstellung (FBK), the “Free Berlin Art Exhibition” in Berlin (Germany), was “unique in its structure”. For 24 years, from 1971 to 1995, it was the only non-juried art exhibition of its size in Europe. It opened after the Große Berliner Kunstausstellung, the “Grand Berlin Art Exhibition”, a juried art exhibition, had closed its doors. Supported by the Senate of Berlin, an association, called the Freie Berliner Kunstausstellung was registered in 1970 with the goal to organize annual exhibitions. Hans-Joachim Zeidler became chairperson of this association for the first four years, followed by Ernst Leonhardt (Artist). During the association's last four years, Karin Rech took over the leadership.

== History ==
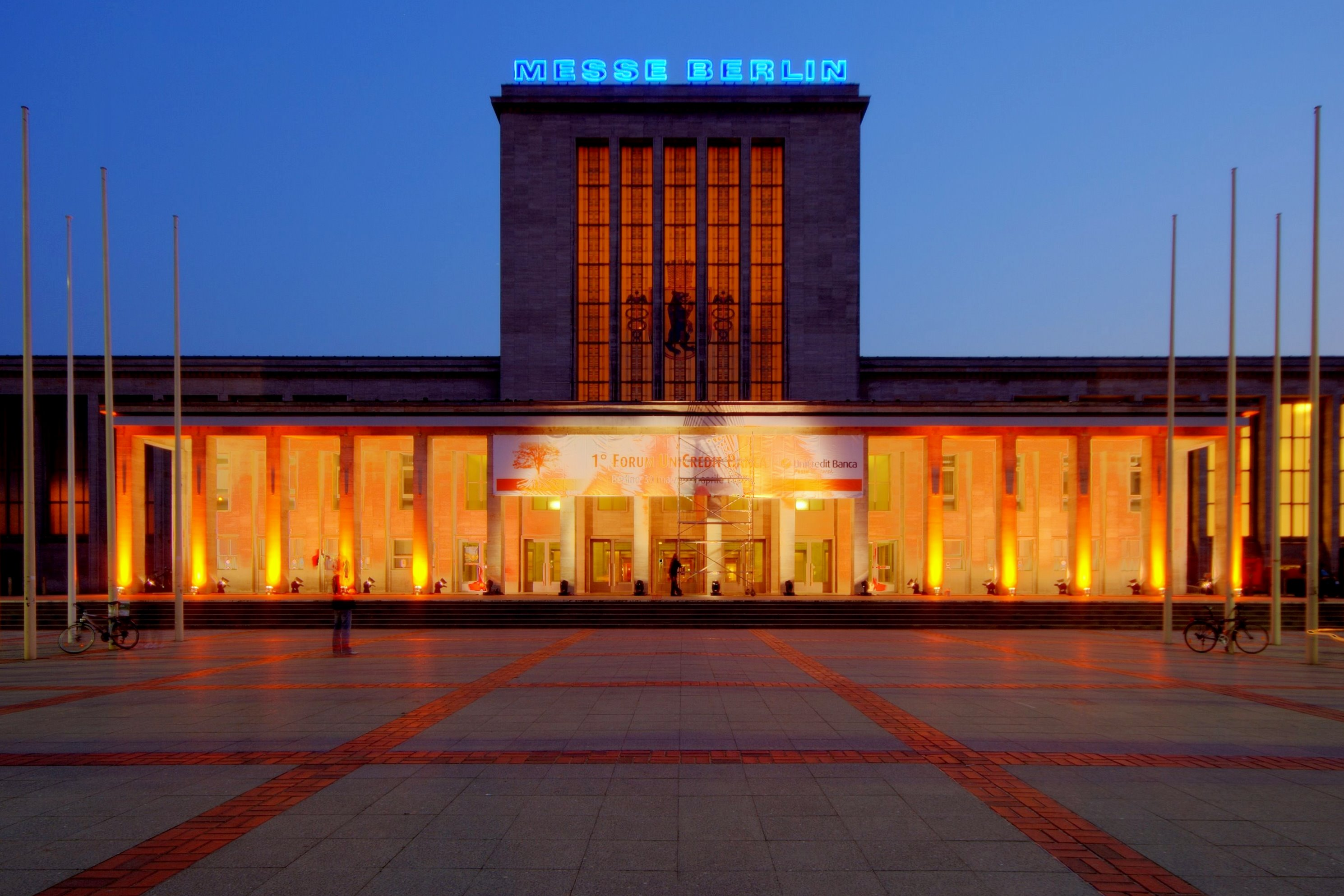
Exhibition halls at the Funkturm Berlin

The first FBK took place in the exhibition halls at the Funkturm Berlin in 1971. At that time, the so-called Counterculture of the 1960s movement was already in full swing. The unrest of this period had inspired many social groups, and artists as well were “woken up”, as Zeidler reported in his review in 1983. Already at its beginning, the FBK was able to “look back on a Berlin tradition that was dating back to the Weimar Republic.” However, early evidence of non-juried art exhibitions points to the 19th century. A poster collection at the Germanisches Nationalmuseum contains a poster by Ludwig von Hofmann. The draft of this poster – which he had originally designed in 1893 for the first Große Berliner Kunstausstellung – was rejected. The portrayal of a “sparsely clad young man was apparently seen as an offense and was removed by the Berlin police, according to contemporary reports.” As some artists had been rejected by the jury of the Große Berliner Kunstausstellung, a second exhibition, which had called itself FBK, was organized, running concurrently with the Große Berliner Kunstausstellung. Its location was close by, across the road at the Moltke Bridge. It accepted Ludwig von Hofmann's poster. Käthe Kollwitz, who was still an unknown artist at that time, exhibited in 1895 in the FBK which had always been seen as an alternative to the juried art exhibitions.

In addition to these early historical roots, the Non-Juried Art Exhibition featured a direct predecessor in 1965, as mentioned in the archives of the Association of Female Artists of Berlin. After the FBK had presented its first exhibition in 1971, it took 12 years for an acting mayor of Berlin to officially comment on the exhibition. Such comments had been anticipated for years. In 1983 Richard von Weizsäcker was the first mayor who was willing to write words of acknowledgement. Since then greetings from the acting mayor of Berlin became a tradition.

The Freie Berliner Kunstausstellung has established itself in the cultural life of Berlin and beyond. It has long embodied a piece of Zeitgeist, changeable, full of surprises, appreciated or criticized, always alive. The 13th Freie Berliner Kunstausstellung will also spark discussions, raise questions and leave them unanswered, letting what is transitory and what is permanent come into contact. Berlin can not and should not do without an exhibition of this kind. I hope that it will generate the same lively interest which a receptive audience full of dedication and contradiction also devoted to its predecessors.

— Richard von Weizsäcker 1983, Zeit Online

For the first time in 1990, after what was called Die Wende – after the fall of the Berlin Wall but before German reunification – Walter Momper, mayor of Berlin at that time, congratulated the FBK, hoping for “satisfied artists and many interested visitors from East and West”. In 1991 the time had come to announce: “The 21st FBK is finally a free exhibition for all artists of Berlin.”

From the very beginning, the “fiercely controversial but hotly loved” FBK faced criticism, sometimes there was even harsh rejection. The critics turned against the concept of a non-juried exhibition, as well as the inclusion of anyone who wanted to exhibit. This allowed “young, unknown, perhaps also ‘not so good’ artists, such as hobby artists, to participate.” Many rejected this concept. Leonhardt pointed out the “charm of the FBK” and stressed that for some it was “a spring-board to a great career”. For Nicole Bröhan, the “always controversial mixture of professional and amateur artists […] created its special appeal”. In 1994 she wrote in the Berliner Zeitung that she saw the FBK as “talent forging”. Despite all the positive reports, the FBK's continued existence was always at risk. “What a triumph! The FBK, which is dead at least once every year, will turn 25. Who would have thought?” With these words, Ernst Leonhardt, meanwhile honorary chairman of the association, began his review at the FBK's 25th anniversary. He could not know at that time that, due to the financial situation, it would be the last opening of the FBK. For that exhibition to take place at all, there was an “art auction during which 1,000 works donated by Berlin artists were auctioned off” – “in order to support the exhibition”.

== Organization ==
Free Berlin Art Exhibition
- Freie Berliner Kunstausstellung e. V.
- Abbreviation: FBK
- Formation: 1970
- Dissolved: 1995
- Type: NGO
- Location: Berlin
- Staff: Hans-Joachim Zeidler (1971–1974); Ernst Leonhardt (1981–1990); Karin Rech (1991–1995)

Unlike the usual concepts of exhibitions, the goal of the FBK was for the artists themselves, not professional gallery owners or curators, to take over management and organization of the exhibition, as well as the hanging of the art works. A jury did not exist. Organizer of the exhibitions was the registered association of the FBK. The management of the exhibitions was led by the respective chairperson of the association, while the organizational aspects were handled by a group of seven members. The preparation and execution of the exhibitions was coordinated by the "Colleagues of the Management". As a rule, the FBK took place in the second quarter of each year. Around Christmas the year before, registration forms were sent to the artists.

Two divisions were set up, a Free Division and a division for groups. The former consisted of professional artists only, the latter of non-professional artists who joined as groups. Among the many exhibiting artist groups were diverse artist associations, as well as students from the Berlin University of the Arts, which regularly exhibited as a large group of their own.

The usually not conflict-free process of hanging the art work was organized based on its own concept. A “Hanging Commission” was set up for the Free Division. It was the commission's responsibility to find a suitable place for about 1,200 works of art within three days. The groups were each assigned a location appropriate to their size in which they arranged the hanging themselves.

Two-thirds of the exhibitors were professional artists, one third ‘hobby artists’. At the 20th anniversary of the exhibition, the chairman expressed satisfaction that the Free Division and the groups were now “finally equal” in the allocation of space. Among the celebrities of the exhibitors were Louise Rösler, Walter Stöhrer, Fred Thieler and Jürgen Draeger. The latter presented on his website several cover pages of the catalogs. While for almost 20 years male artists were overrepresented, the gender distribution was balanced for the first time in 1990 – “without any quotation”, as Walter Momper acknowledged in his greeting. Other notable artists were Shahla Aghapour, Friedrich Ahlers-Hestermann, Rainer Fetting, Peter Robert Keil, Matthias Koeppel, Ingo Kühl, Salomé and Walter Stöhrer.

== Exhibition ==
For four weeks each year, between April and June, the FBK organizers opened the doors of the exhibition halls at the Funkturm Berlin and invited the public. “Drawings, pictures, spatial as well as sound and video installations, sculptures, collages, photography” were presented. In addition to depressive performances, there were also humorous inventions, such as a potency automat (1986) or an art licensing machine(1989). Over the years, not only the exhibition itself, but also the accompanying program developed. Prints and small sculptures were sold in a bazaar. On Saturdays there were guided tours. A traditional breakfast with jazz music and discussions enjoyed increasing popularity. A Kinderatelier (children's art room) was open daily where children, guided by artists, could paint. While the program changed at times, there were special readings by women, or “music played on historical instruments”. The exhibition management was also interested in the outer appearance of the exhibition halls. A proposal for a flag project was repeatedly turned down by the Senate. Eventually the artists financed the project at their own expense. In 1989 “the visitors of the 19th FBK were greeted at the entrance to the exhibition halls by 70 colourful flags [...], which had never been shown before”. In 1991, as in previous years, a “graphic competition for students of the Berlin University of the Arts” was organized. In 1992, the project began with picture panels, 30 large-format paintings on the outside of the exhibition halls, designed to “catch the eye”. For the first time in 1993, art discussions were held in which artists and visitors alike participated. They took place every day, with the aim to encourage “thinking with one's eyes”. A five-minute-long video, published on YouTube on October 5, 2010, highlights events of the 19th FBK. It provides an impression of the atmosphere typical of the exhibitions.

== Media ==
The media-echo was slow in coming. In 1983 – twelve years after the FBK's opening – Leonhardt still expressed hope “that the media would finally provide stronger support to this exhibition”. In 1990 he was able to report that “the acceptance we have recently received from the media was positive and seems to continue to be so.” The Berliner Morgenpost which had already devoted a full, richly illustrated page regarding the FBK, was also reporting regularly.

A forest of images rushes from Hall 20 at Hammarskjöldplatz to Hall 23, waiting for the visitors to explore it. […] Why should four halls deter Berliners […] trained by an exhibition like the Berlin International Green Week? And then there is also the matter of taste, which – as is well known – can't be disputed! Thus, Ernst Leonhardt likes to quote the words of the Secretary of State at the Kultursenator, Lutz von Pufendorf: If the FBK did not exist, it would have to be invented.

— Renate von Eicken, Berliner Morgenpost on April 27th, 1986

== Finances ==
Besides numerous sponsors and catalog advertisers, the FBK was financed by the Senate of Berlin. Over the course of about 20 years, from 1971 to 1993, its budget had grown steadily from 120,000 Deutsche Mark (DM) to over 760,000 DM. During that period, from 1981 to 1983, the budget of the FBK had been fixed and was slightly reduced in 1984. Well-known companies of the city helped fill the gaps. Senator Volker Hassemer secured the budget in 1985 which increased during the following eight years. The rent also increased considerably over the years and amounted to nearly 400,000 DM in 1995, leaving only 360,000 DM of the Senate's grants for the realization of the exhibition. This exhibition would not have been possible without donations from the artists. A year later the Senate stopped the grants entirely. That decision sealed the end of the FBK. During the jubilee exhibition in 1995 the organizers assumed that – while budget cuts had to be made – the FBK could still take place every second year, in a “2-year rhythm”, as the former cultural director Ulrich Roloff-Momin had stated. Nothing came out of it. There were appeals, some of them were drastic:

A city like Berlin, where famous artists are trained at renowned universities, such a city must also provide for their artists and provide them with a forum. Not only imported art is respectable and noteworthy. A city without free art is dead.

— Karin Rech, Katalog of the 24th FBK

== Figures ==
The figures presented here are incomplete. A first overview was published in the catalog of the 20th FBK relating to the years 1971 to 1989, and a second one in the catalog of the 24th FBK for the years 1991 to 1993. Thus, there is no information about 1990 and the last two years.

In the documented period – between 1983 and 1989 – the number of exhibitors increased from 750 to 2,400, with certain fluctuations. The number of groups involved rose from 25 to 82 and peaked with 91 groups in 1992. The number of visitors varied between 12,400 and 34,000 with a high in 1978. The grants made available by the Senate of Berlin for the organization and the set-up of the exhibition increased more or less continuously from 150,000 DM to more than 750,000 DM in 1993. In addition, there were not only sponsors, but also artists who sold their art to cover expenses of the exhibition. Nevertheless, money was always scarce, as Ernst Leonhardt's constantly admonishing words in the catalogs testify. The exhibition space had increased over the years to 9,000 square meters but the rent increased as well. It multiplied sixfold from the beginning to the last exhibition.

With the exception of the first two years, the number of art works that were sold increased consistently and grew steadily to a 6-figure sum, just under half a million in 1992. Yet, Leonhardt regrets: “Not more than about 5 % of the visual artists can support themselves through their work.” There were discussions about the often modest purchases of art works by the Senate of Berlin which were in the single-digit percentage range of the budget for art purchases.“Ridiculous, the disillusioned say, that of a 670,000 DM budget less than 5 % was purchased at the FBK, even though the Senator himself considers this exhibition to be the most important of the year in Berlin.”

Figures 1971–1980 (DM Deutsche Mark)
| FBK | Exhibitors | Groups | Visitors | Grant | Rent | Sales | Purchases by Senate | Purchases by State |
|---|---|---|---|---|---|---|---|---|
| 1971 | 739 | 25 | 12.400 | 150.000 DM | 65.000 DM | 52.500 DM | 18.000 DM | – |
| 1972 | 940 | 29 | 18.000 | 185.000 DM | 80.000 DM | 75.000 DM | 18.417 DM | – |
| 1973 | 1.164 | 32 | 23.000 | 202.000 DM | 90.000 DM | 120.000 DM | 22.069 DM | – |
| 1974 | 1.553 | 40 | 28.000 | 250.000 DM | 95.000 DM | 147.000 DM | 23.897 DM | – |
| 1975 | 1.564 | 54 | 29.500 | 270.000 DM | 55.000 DM | 130.000 DM | 25.856 DM | 25.000 DM |
| 1976 | 1.635 | 61 | 30.000 | 330.000 DM | 50.000 DM | 111.000 DM | 23.572 DM | – |
| 1977 | 1.673 | 65 | 34.000 | 345.000 DM | 50.000 DM | 153.000 DM | 23.500 DM | 16.500 DM |
| 1978 | 1.806 | 74 | 36.000 | 409.000 DM | 110.000 DM | 205.000 DM | 26.500 DM | 5.400 DM |
| 1979 | 1.832 | 76 | 32.000 | 450.000 DM | 120.000 DM | 282.000 DM | 25.000 DM | 135.000 DM |
| 1980 | 1.975 | 76 | 26.000 | 523.600 DM | 150.000 DM | 256.000 DM | 52.000 DM | 64.000 DM |

Figures 1981–1989
| FBK | Exhibitors | Groups | Visitors | Grant | Rent | Sales | Purchases by Senate | Purchases by State |
|---|---|---|---|---|---|---|---|---|
| 1981 | 1.962 | 69 | 27.000 | 560.000 DM | 150.000 DM | 261.000 DM | 26.000 DM | 63.000 DM |
| 1982 | 2.026 | 62 | 29.000 | 565.000 DM | 180.000 DM | 294.000 DM | 40.000 DM | 97.000 DM |
| 1983 | 2.300 | 68 | 29.000 | 565.000 DM | 195.000 DM | 331.800 DM | 37.000 DM | 77.250 DM |
| 1984 | 2.150 | 61 | 27.500 | 559.350 DM | 210.000 DM | 231.100 DM | 33.000 DM | 51.500 DM |
| 1985 | 2.100 | 70 | 27.500 | 595.000 DM | 225.000 DM | 191.100 DM | 33.000 DM | 51.500 DM |
| 1986 | 2.400 | 77 | 33.900 | 612.000 DM | 240.000 DM | 250.300 DM | 10.800 DM | 26.800 DM |
| 1987 | 2.250 | 77 | 29.000 | 630.000 DM | 260.000 DM | 305.200 DM | 59.560 DM | 18.800 DM |
| 1988 | 2.300 | 72 | 28.200 | 641.775 DM | 280.000 DM | 303.000 DM | 38.300 DM | 33.300 DM |
| 1989 | 2.100 | 78 | 31.800 | 648.740 DM | 300.400 DM | 377.000 DM | 39.300 DM | 16.000 DM |

Figures 1991–1993
| FBK | Exhibitors | Groups | Visitors | Grant | Rent | Sales | Purchases by Senate |
|---|---|---|---|---|---|---|---|
| 1991 | 2.300 | 84 | 29.000 | 727.085 DM | 335.500 DM | 430.767 DM | 16.000 DM |
| 1992 | 2.300 | 91 | 18.839 | 785.780 DM | 355.750 DM | 310.199 DM | 33.350 DM |
| 1993 | 2.400 | 82 | 21.500 | 761.000 DM | 376.000 DM | 324.614 DM | 4.500 DM |

== Managers and Organizers ==
Managers and Organizers 1971–1975
| FBK | 1971 | 1972 | 1973 | 1974 | 1975 |
|---|---|---|---|---|---|
| 1st Chairperson | Hans-Joachim Zeidler | Hans-Joachim Zeidler | Hans-Joachim Zeidler | Hans-Joachim Zeidler | Arwed D. Gorella |
| 2nd Chairperson | Dietmar Lemcke | Dietmar Lemcke | Dietmar Lemcke | Dietmar Lemcke | Dietmar Lemcke |
| Treasurer | | | | | |
| Secretary | Arwed D. Gorella | Arwed D. Gorella | Arwed D. Gorella | Arwed D. Gorella | Matthias Koeppel |
| General Manager | Otto Maßnick | Otto Maßnick | Otto Maßnick | Otto Maßnick | Otto Maßnick |
| Leadership | Friedrich Ahlers-Hestermann] Fritz Blau; Eugen Clermont; Bert Düerkop; Matthias Koeppel; Dietmar Lemcke; Hans-Joachim Zeidler | Friedrich Ahlers-Hestermann; Fritz Blau; Eugen Clermont; Bert Düerkop; Matthias Koeppel; Dietmar Lemcke; Hans-Joachim Zeidler | Manfred Beelke; Eugen Clermont; Bert Düerkop; H. Oskar Gonschorr; Matthias Koeppel; Günter Ohlwein; Dieter Ruckhaberle; Gert Vangermain | Manfred Beelke; Eugen Clermont; Bert Düerkop; H. Oskar Gonschorr; Günter Anlau; Dieter Ruckhaberle; Gert Vangermain | Manfred Beelke; Wolfgang Bier; Bert Düerkop; Ernst Leonhardt; Dieter Masuhr; Karlheinz Ziegler (Painter) |
| Technical Leader | | | | | Uwe Witt |

Managers and Organizers 1976–1980
| FBK | 1976 | 1977 | 1978 | 1979 | 1980 |
|---|---|---|---|---|---|
| 1st Chairperson | Arwed D. Gorella | Jürgen Waller | Jürgen Waller | Günter Anlauf | Günter Anlauf |
| 2nd Chairperson | Dietmar Lemcke | Matthias Koeppel | Matthias Koeppel | Ernst Leonhardt (Artist) | Ernst Leonhardt |
| Treasurer | | | | | |
| Secretary | Matthias Koeppel | Günter Anlauf | Günter Anlauf | Gisela Lehmann | Gisela Lehmann |
| General Manager | Otto Maßnick | Otto Maßnick | Otto Maßnick | Otto Maßnick | Otto Maßnick |
| Leadership | Günter Anlauf; Manfred Beelke; Wolfgang Bier; Bert Düerkop; Ernst Leonhardt; Dieter Masuhr; Karlheinz Ziegler (Painter) | Manfred Beelke; Gisela Lehmann; Ernst Leonhardt; Joachim Liestmann; Dieter Masuhr; Peter Müller; Karlheinz Ziegler | Manfred Beelke; Gisela Lehmann; Ernst Leonhardt; Joachim Liestmann; Dieter Masuhr; Peter Müller; Karlheinz Ziegler | Manfred Beelke; Martin Fricke; Joachim Liestmann; Dieter Masuhr; Peter Müller; Karin Rech; Karlheinz Ziegler | Manfred Beelke; Martin Fricke; Joachim Liestmann; Dieter Masuhr; Peter Müller; Karin Rech; Karlheinz Ziegler |
| Technical Leader | Uwe Witt | Uwe Witt | Uwe Witt | Uwe Witt | Uwe Witt |

Managers and Organizers 1981–1985
| FBK | 1981 | 1982 | 1983 | 1984 | 1985 |
|---|---|---|---|---|---|
| 1st Chairperson | Ernst Leonhardt (Artist) | Ernst Leonhardt | Ernst Leonhardt | Ernst Leonhardt | Ernst Leonhardt |
| 2nd Chairperson | Günter Anlauf | Günter Anlauf | Günter Anlauf | Günter Anlauf | Peter Müller |
| Treasurer | | | | Peter Müller | Günter Anlauf |
| Secretary | Karin Rech | Karin Rech | Karin Rech | Karin Rech | Dieter Ruckhaberle |
| General Manager | Otto Maßnick | Otto Maßnick | Otto Maßnick | | |
| Leadership | Manfred Beelke; Martin Fricke; H. Oskar Gonschorr; Rudolf Hübler; Joachim Liestmann; Peter Müller; Lo Zahn | Manfred Beelke; Martin Fricke; H. Oskar Gonschorr; Rudolf Hübler; Joachim Liestmann; Peter Müller; Lo Zahn | Manfred Beelke; H. Oskar Gonschorr; Rudolf Hübler; Joachim Liestmann; Peter Müller; Norbert Stratmann; Lo Zahn | Manfred Beelke; H. Oskar Gonschorr; Rudolf Hübler; Joachim Liestmann; Norbert Stratmann; Lo Zahn | Manfred Beelke; H. Oskar Gonschorr; Joachim Liestmann; Norbert Stratmann; Mara Hahlbrock; Ernst v. Hopffgarten; Dieter Tyspe |
| Technical Leader | Otto Maßnick; Dieter Zahn | Otto Maßnick; Dieter Zahn | Dieter Zahn | Dieter Zahn | Dieter Zahn |
| Acting Manager | | | | Ernst Leonhardt | Ernst Leonhardt |

Managers and Organizers 1986–1990
| FBK | 1986 | 1987 | 1988 | 1989 | 1990 |
|---|---|---|---|---|---|
| 1st Chairperson | Ernst Leonhardt (Artist) | Ernst Leonhardt | Ernst Leonhardt | Ernst Leonhardt | Ernst Leonhardt |
| 2nd Chairperson | Günter Anlauf | Günter Anlauf | Günter Anlauf | Peter Müller | Peter Müller |
| Treasurer | Peter Müller | Peter Müller | Peter Müller | Karin Rech | Karin Rech |
| Secretary | Dieter Ruckhaberle | Dieter Ruckhaberle | Dieter Ruckhaberle | Norbert Wirth | Norbert Wirth |
| General Manager | Bärbel Stegmess | Bärbel Stegmess | Bärbel Stegmess | Bärbel Stegmess | Bärbel Stegmess |
| Leadership | Manfred Beelke; H. Oskar Gonschorr; Joachim Liestmann; Norbert Stratmann; Mara Hahlbrock; Ernst v. Hopffgarten; Dieter Tyspe | Manfred Beelke; Gisela von Bruchhausen; H. Oskar Gonschorr; Joachim Liestmann; Norbert Stratmann; Ernst v. Hopffgarten; Dieter Tyspe | Bernd Beck; Gisela v. Bruchhausen; H. Oskar Gonschorr; Peter Kurz; Gisela Lehmann; Dieter Masuhr; Karin Rech | Bernd Beck; Gisela v. Bruchhausen; H. Oskar Gonschorr; Peter Kurz; Gisela Lehmann; Dieter Masuhr | Christian Buchloh; H. Oskar Gonschorr; Norbert Fritsch; Joachim Liestmann; Martin Noll; Oda Schöller; Jan-Michael Sobottka |
| Technical Leader | Werner Ahrens | Werner Ahrens | Werner Ahrens | Werner Ahrens | Werner Ahrens |

Managers and Organizers 1991–1994
| FBK | 1991 | 1992 | 1993 | 1994 |
|---|---|---|---|---|
| 1st Chairperson | Karin Rech | Karin Rech | Karin Rech | Karin Rech |
| 2nd Chairperson | Peter Müller | Peter Müller | Peter Müller | Peter Müller |
| Treasurer | Eleonore Fuchs | Eleonore Fuchs–Heidelberg | Eleonore Fuchs–Heidelberg | Eleonore Fuchs–Heidelberg |
| Secretarary | Norbert Wirth | Norbert Wirth | Norbert Fritsch | Norbert Fritsch |
| General Manager | Bärbel Stegmess | Bärbel Stegmess | Bärbel Stegmess | Bärbel Stegmess |
| Leadership | Christian Buchloh; Norbert Fritsch; H. Oskar Gonschorr; Joachim Liestmann; Martin Noll; Oda Schoeller; Jan-Michael Scobottka | Christian Buchloh; Norbert Fritsch; Manfred Fuchs; H. Oskar Gonschorr; Joachim Liestmann; Martin Noll; Oda Schoeller | Christian Buchloh; Manfred Fuchs; H. Oskar Gonschorr; Joachim Liestmann; Martin Noll; Carola Peitz; Oda Schoeller | Christian Buchloh; Manfred Fuchs; Joachim Liestmann; Martin Noll; Oda Schoeller; Oliver Scholten; Anna Werkmeister |
| Technical Leader | Werner Ahrens | Detlef Mallwitz | Detlef Mallwitz | Detlef Mallwitz |
| Honorary Chairperson | Ernst Leonhardt (Artist) | Ernst Leonhardt | Ernst Leonhardt | Ernst Leonhardt |
