= Furnishing of the antechamber of the private apartments of the Élysée Palace for President Georges Pompidou =

Furnishing of the antechamber of the private apartments of the Élysée Palace for President Georges Pompidou (fr: Aménagement de l'antichambre des appartements privés du Palais de l'Elysée pour le président Georges Pompidou) - In 1971 Georges Pompidou, the then President of France commissioned the Israeli sculptor Yaacov Agam (1928-2026) to create a whole room installation for his private apartments in the Elysee Palace, the French Presidential residence. The work took from 1972 to 1974 to complete In 1979 it was moved to the then new Centre Pompidou.

== Description ==
The work is an instillation incorporating the floor and ceiling of a rectangular room. It is 622 cm long by 548 cm wide (34 m2 on the floor) with 470 cm high ceilings. One side is outfitted with translucent and colored plexiglass sheets (red, orange, yellow, green, blue, and purple) serving as doors. The other three walls have large paintings composed of beveled vertical elements, painted with abstract motifs and whose appearance varies according to the angle of view.

The ceiling is equipped with painted aluminum profiles, in zigzag. On the floor, a huge woollen carpet covers almost the entire space, also with an abstract composition.

A kinetic sculpture in polished steel, "The Flying Triangle", completes the installation.

== History ==
From the 1950s onwards, Yaacov Agam produced paintings in which a succession of beveled elements, painted differently depending on the face, made it possible to exhibit abstract paintings whose content changed according to the angle of view. In 1970, the artist carried out the complete design of a hall in the cultural and social centre of Leverkusen in Germany. Georges Pompidou, President of the French Republic since 1969, commissioned Agam to furnish the antechamber of his private apartments at the Élysée Palace in 1971. Agam carried out this development between 1972 and 1974.

In April 1974, when Georges Pompidou died, the salon was not finished: Yaacov Agam completed it that year with the carpet (executed by the Gobelins factory) and the mobile sculpture. After the election of Valéry Giscard d'Estaing as president, the salon was dismantled.

The entire work was exhibited at the Musée National d'Art Moderne at the Centre Georges-Pompidou between 1979 and 1984, and then again from 2000 forward. It occupies the entire room 10 of the museum's contemporary collections: direct access to the recreation of the salon is not allowed, but the public perceives it directly through the translucent colored panels.
