= Leonard Dobbin =

Leonard Dobbin may refer to:

- Leonard Dobbin (politician) (1762–1844), Irish politician
- Leonard Dobbin (chemist) (1858–1952), chemist and author
- Len Dobbin (1935–2009), jazz radio broadcaster and critic
