= DJ Static (Canadian DJ) =

- Born: 1977 (age 48–49)

This is about the Canadian DJ. For other similarly named DJs, see DJ Static (disambiguation)

DJ Static (born Michael Lai in 1977) is a well-known Canadian DJ and radio personality.

He arrived in 1988 from Hong Kong settling first in Vancouver, British Columbia, Canada then in Montreal, Quebec. He credits hip hop music with helping him learn English and started DJing in 1994.

In 1996, in collaboration with fellow Canadian DJ Professor Groove, he launched the award-winning WeFunk weekly radio show on Montreal's CKUT 90.3, McGill University's radio station.

Since 1999, the show is also available online through WEFUNK Radio. Both DJs play a symbiotic mix of Funk, Soul, R&B and Rap, both old and new. The name of the radio show comes from the Parliament song "P. Funk (Wants To Get Funked Up)", in which WEFUNK is a fictional radio station broadcasting "directly from the Mothership, top of the Chocolate Milky Way, 500,000 kilowatts of P Funk-power." The Internet radio stream in 1999, becoming one of the oldest continuously operating radio streams on the Internet, as well as one of the longest-running online radio shows.

DJ Static became DJ for the Canadian multicultural multilingual hip-hop group Nomadic Massive. The members of the band come from Haiti, Algeria, Iraq, China, Argentina, Chile and France.

In addition to his radio work and work with Nomadic Massive, he has club residencies in Blizzarts and Boa in Montreal. At various times, he has DJed internationally including various American and Canadian venues, Cuba, Hong Kong and Zurich.
