= Chih-Chien Wang =

Canadian artist

Chih-Chien Wang (born 1970) is a Taiwanese-born Canadian photographer. Wang was born in Tainan, Taiwan; since 2002, he has lived in Montreal, Quebec. His work is represented by Pierre-François Ouellette art contemporain (PFOAC), a contemporary art gallery in Montreal, Quebec.

== Collections ==
Wang's work is included in the collections of the Montreal Museum of Fine Arts, the Musée national des beaux-arts du Québec, the Montreal Museum of Contemporary Art, the National Gallery of Canada, and the Canada Council Art Bank.

== Selected exhibitions ==
- As far as we were; as close as I can, Montreal Museum of Fine Arts, Montréal, curated by Diane Charbonneau, 2012
- The Act of Forgetting, Fonderie Darling, Montreal, curated by Caroline Andrieux, 2015
- Under Two Lights, Künstlerhaus Bethanien, Berlin, 2016
