= Ian Ferrier =

Canadian poet, musician, and choreographer (1954–2023)

- Born: 1954; Montreal, Quebec, Canada
- Died: 3 November 2023 (aged 68)
- Occupations: Poet; Musician

Ian Ferrier (1954 – 3 November 2023) was a Canadian poet, musician, and cultural arts organizer. As co-founder of the Wired on Words record label, longtime organizer of The Words and Music Show, author of four chapbooks, and member of the voice/music fusion collective Pharmakon MTL, he was a central figure in the Montreal music, poetry, and spoken word scene from the 1990s until his death in 2023.

== Biography ==
Ilay Ian Charles Ferrier was born in Montreal in 1954. He studied literature and creative writing at Concordia University, where as an undergraduate he co-founded the literary journal Los in 1975.

Montreal environments feature in his first book of poetry, From yr lover like an orchestra, published by Davinci press in 1974. David Lawson of The Gazette wrote, "most of his collection consists not of observable poems but of paragraphs, sometimes indented, and occasional spare lines, all of which add up to a frankly experimental effect." Louis Dudek, reviewing the book in Anthol, a Montreal literary magazine, acknowledged it as the work of a poet in a "preliminary" stage and called it "a documentary of chaos" whose "poetry ... is not aiming at a higher aesthetic but is drawn down to the messiness of the surrounding environment."

Ferrier was the author of an early interactive online novel, The Heart of the Machine, started in 1986 with Fortner Anderson and illustrator Philip Mackenzie. The novel was published serially on CompuServe, The WELL, and other early internet services, and the publishers invited readers to influence the story with their comments, suggestions, and character sketches.

In the mid-1990s, live poetry was gaining popularity in Montreal due to the rise of poetry slams in the United States, the increasing impact of rap and hip-hop, and the crossover of poetry to pop music. Lollapalooza's first visit to Montreal, in 1994, included a spoken word stage featuring local performers. Ferrier became an important figure in the scene. With Fortner Anderson, he co-founded the record label Wired on Words in 1993. The label recorded performances by Montreal spoken word artists for broadcast on CKUT-FM, the campus radio station of McGill University. Several poets made the top ten on the station's charts, and the program won a Standard Broadcasting Award. Ferrier used the award money to record Millennium Cabaret, a 1998 CD release featuring poetry by Anderson, Heather O'Neill, Todd Swift and others.

Ferrier grew interested in combining his poetry with music. In 2000, he released a book/CD titled Exploding Head Man on Planète Rebelle. The work features instrumentation from area musicians, and was a critical success. Ilana Kronick of The Gazette praised the "sonic power" of its "heady, impassioned, sometimes hallucinogenic" poetry and the "smart guitar, bass, percussion and tablas". Hal Niedzviecki reviewed the release for Broken Pencil and the National Post, writing that the "poems/songs merge into each other, become a musical score lament for an absent world" and calling it one of the year's best spoken word releases.

On Ralph Alfonso's Bongo Beat label, Ferrier released two more projects combining music and spoken word: 2007's What Is This Place? and 2010's To Call Out in the Night. On What Is This Place?, Ferrier began a collaboration with Pharmakon MTL, a "voice music improv project" with Kris Mah on guitar, Dave Stein on drums and Moe Clark and Valerie Curro Khayat on vocals. What Is This Place? was reviewed positively by UK Vibe. In Arc Poetry Magazine, Kai Cheng Thom gave To Call Out in the Night a mostly positive review, calling it "[j]azzy and sensuous... a landmark in the fledgling tradition that is Canadian spoken word", though noting that Ferrier could widen his range of intonation.

Ferrier continued to be an active organizer in the Montreal cultural arts scene throughout the 2000s. He helped launch the inaugural Festival Voix d'Amériques in February 2002, and organized The Words and Music Show, which presented live music, literature, and art at Casa del Popolo, a venue on Montreal's Saint Laurent Boulevard. The series was founded in the early 2000s and produced monthly shows until 2021; Ferrier's organizing included grant writing, artist invitations, and advertising. The show's performances were recorded, and eventually digitally archived as part of Concordia University's SpokenWeb project.

From 2002 to 2005 Ferrier was president of the Quebec Writers' Federation. In 2010, he became the editor of LitLive.ca – The Canadian Review of Literature in Performance, an online journal of literature performance, and started the Mile End Poets' Festival. In 2011, Ferrier won the Calgary International Spoken Word Festival's Sheri-D Wilson Golden Beret for his work in the spoken word community. In 2017, a translation of his poems was published by Éditions du Noroît under the title Quel est ce lieu. For his contributions to Montreal literary arts, he was awarded the 2022 Judy Mappin Community Award by the Quebec Writers' Federation.

Ian Ferrier died on 3 November 2023 of brain cancer. Following his death, the Quebec Writers' Federation renamed their prize for spoken word to the Ian Ferrier Spoken Word Prize in his honor.

== Works ==
=== Poetry ===
- From yr lover like an orchestra (1974)
- Exploding Head Man (2000)
- Coming & Going (2015)
- Bear Dreams (2016)

=== Youth ===
- A Child Sees Winter Coming and a Bear Dreams (2018)

=== CDs ===
- What Is This Place? (2007)
- To Call Out In The Night (2010)
