= Kinetics =

Kinetics (Ancient Greek: κίνησις, lit. 'kinesis', movement or to move) may refer to:

== Science and medicine ==
- Kinetics (physics), the study of motion and its causes
  - Rigid body kinetics, the study of the motion of rigid bodies
- Chemical kinetics, the study of chemical reaction rates
  - Enzyme kinetics, the study of biochemical reaction rates catalysed by an enzyme
    - Michaelis–Menten kinetics, the widely accepted general model of enzyme kinetics
    - Goldbeter–Koshland kinetics, describe a steady-state solution for a 2-state biological system
    - Langmuir–Hinshelwood kinetics
  - Receptor–ligand kinetics, a branch of chemical kinetics in which the kinetic species are defined by different non-covalent bindings and/or conformations of the molecules involved, which are denoted as receptor(s) and ligand(s)
    - Hill kinetics
- Pharmacokinetics, the study of the processes a substance undergoes in the animal body, particularly the rates at which it is absorbed, distributed, metabolised and excreted
  - One-compartment kinetics, for a chemical compound specifies that the uptake in the compartment is proportional to the concentration outside the compartment, and the elimination is proportional to the concentration inside the compartment
  - Flip-flop kinetics, the pharmacokinetics of sustained-release or extended-release drug formulations
  - Toxicokinetics, the branch of pharmacokinetics dealing with compounds that are toxic or can be administered in toxic doses
- Human kinetics or kinesiology, the study of human biomechanical movement
- C_{0}t analysis, also known as DNA recombination kinetics

== Companies ==
- Kinetics (company), a technology company
- KinetX, an aerospace engineering company
- ST Kinetics, a weaponry and specialty vehicle manufacturer
- Color Kinetics, a former lighting company, now part of the Philips group of companies

== Arts and entertainment ==
- Kinetics (rapper), rapper and songwriter from New York City

== Other uses ==
- Kinetics Internet Protocol (KIP), an AppleTalk network protocol
- NASCAR Kinetics, a semester-long experiential program offered to several American universities
- Kinetic sculpture race, human-powered art vehicle contest started in California
- Kinetic activity (military terminology)

== See also ==
- Dynamics (disambiguation)
- Kinetic (disambiguation)
- Kinematics, a branch of classical mechanics that describes the motion of particles (alternatively "points"), objects ("bodies"), and groups of objects ("systems of bodies") without considering the mass of each or the forces that caused the motion
- Analytical mechanics, a collection of closely related alternative formulations of classical mechanics
- Analytical dynamics, concerned about the relationship between motion of bodies and its causes, namely the forces acting on the bodies and the properties of the bodies (particularly mass and moment of inertia)
