= Dynamic resolution =

Dynamic resolution may refer to:

- An asymmetric biocatalysis product, in organic chemistry
- Dynamic audio range
  - Dynamic Resolution Adaptation, an audio encoding specification
- Dynamic resolution scaling, a real-time image scaling rendering technique

== See also ==
- Dynamics (disambiguation)
- Resolution (disambiguation)
