= Kinetic =

Kinetic (Ancient Greek: κίνησις “kinesis”, movement or to move) may refer to:

- Kinetic theory, describing a gas as particles in random motion
- Kinetic energy, the energy of an object that it possesses due to its motion

== Art and entertainment ==
- Kinetic art, a form of art involving mechanical and/or random movement, including optical illusions.
- Kinetic, the 13th episode of the first season of the TV series Smallville
- Kinetic (comics), a comic by Allan Heinberg and Kelley Pucklett
- "Kinetic" (song), a song by Radiohead

== Business ==
- Kinetic, a brand of Windstream Holdings
- Kinetic Engineering Limited, Indian automotive manufacturer
- Kinetic Group, Australian-based public transport company
  - Kinetic Cairns
  - Kinetic Gold Coast
  - Kinetic Melbourne
  - Kinetic Rockhampton
  - Kinetic Sunshine Coast
  - Kinetic Townsville

== Technology ==
- "Kinetic", Seiko's trademark for its automatic quartz technology
- The Kinetic camera system by Birt Acres (1854–1918), photographer and film pioneer
- Kinetic projectile

== Military terminology ==
- Kinetic military action

== See also ==
- Kinetics (disambiguation)
- Dynamics (disambiguation)
- Operation Kinetic (disambiguation)
- Qinetiq, an international defence technology company
- Kinetica, a 2001 futuristic racing video game for the PlayStation 2
