= Claude Montana =

French fashion designer (1947–2024)

- Born: Claude Montamat; 29 June 1947; Paris, France
- Died: 23 February 2024 (aged 76); Paris, France
- Education: Lycée Condorcet
- Known for: Fashion Design
- Style: Haute Couture; Punk Chic; Big Look; Retro-Science Fiction; Space Age Revival
- Spouse: Wallis Franken (1993-1996)
- Awards: Commandeur Ordre des Arts et des Lettres; Balenciaga Prize; Dés d'Or (Golden Thimble)

Claude Montana (29 June 1947 – 23 February 2024) was a French fashion designer. His company, The House of Montana, founded in 1979, went bankrupt in 1997. He was also nicknamed "King of the Shoulder Pad," designing aggressive silhouettes which came to define the ‘power-dressing’ era of the 1980s.

== Early life ==
Claude Montamat was born at Place du Palais-Royal in Paris on 29 June 1947, the youngest of three children of a German mother and a Catalan-Spanish father, a former army officer who owned a textile manufacturing company. Claude attended the prestigious Lycée Condorcet and completed his baccalauréat, but his refusal to choose a "respectable" career led to a falling-out with his highly bourgeois family. He briefly worked at the Paris Opera but, by age 20, he was living in poverty in London, where he began making papier-mâché Mexican-style jewelry covered with rhinestones; he was now using the name 'Montana'. The jewellery was discovered by British Vogue, which gave it a two-page spread. This led to retail opportunities but Montana's lack of a British work permit forced him to return to France.

== Career ==
Montana shared an apartment with his friend, designer Thierry Mugler and returned to work at the Paris Opera, where one of the costume designers encouraged him to start drawing. His sketches were discovered and, in 1972, he was hired as an assistant and cutter at the luxury leather goods house Mac Douglas; when his boss left the company, Montana was given responsibility for a third of its line. Simultaneously, he designed ready-to-wear leather collections for Idéal-Cuir and Complice, introducing his exceptional craftsmanship and innovative leather clothing. In the mid-70s, Montana designed knitwear for Ferrer y Sentis, contributing accomplished versions of the layered, oversized, natural-fiber garments of the Big Look; now, he had his own label, "Ferrer y Sentis pour Claude Montana".

Montana's first fashion show took place in April 1976, at Angelina Tea House in Paris. He attracted attention the following year for his 'Punk Chic' leather garments—coats, jackets, caps and trousers adorned with epaulets and silver chains, which some said looked Nazi-inspired. His futuristic creations, notable for razor-sharp tailoring and strong silhouettes, introduced a combination of sex, power and fetishism to fashion. His theatrical shows, with flashing lights, dark classical music and robotic models, became must-sees in Paris and New York, with people clamoring to get in.

In 1978, Montana led the 'shoulder pad movement', garnering international attention for presenting 6" shoulders and huge shelf-like sleeves. That was followed by what was called his "intergalactic" or "Mongolian-Martian" looks, which included glitter‐splashed dresses, big cape collars, short tight skirts, tightly belted waistlines, pointed shoulders and headdresses with feathers, gold cones and jewels.

In 1979, Montana founded The House of Montana, which was managed by his sister Jacqueline. He quickly became a darling of 1980s high fashion. He joined the Official Calendar of Paris Fashion Week Womenswear Fall-Winter 1981. His emphasis was on a new proportion, with the body streamlined at the bottom and wide at the top. He was an avid colorist and favored blue, red, metallic, and neutral tones, in cashmere, wool, leather and silk. He introduced tight stretch pants with stirrups, white cowboy boots, polo shirts, and car coats, and would continue to be associated with exaggerated shoulder pads through the 1980s. He introduced androgyny, and references to Hollywood of the 1940s and 1950s. While he provided comfortable clothing at varying price points, his edgy leathers were worn by celebrities and his shows continued to fascinate. Montana was a perfectionist who directed every detail of his shows and was known to spend as long as 45 minutes dressing one model. Models were given specific instructions as to walk speed and poses and, with the accompaniment of the music of Wagner, each show was a presentation of glamour, beauty and power.

In 1981, Montana designed his first menswear line, Montana Hommes, notable for fringed leather jackets, colorful broad-shouldered suits, metal studs and asymmetrical zippers. That year, he opened his first boutique in Paris; he opened another in 1986, by which time his clothes were available in high-end stores in other countries, such as Bloomingdales New York. Working with Marisa Modiano, a designer at the Italian company Genny which manufactured his clothes, he launched a more affordable line, Complice.

Parfums Montana was created in 1986, with fragrances created by a long line of master perfumers. The company was launched with Montana Parfum de Peau. That was followed by Montana Pour Femme (1986), Parfum d'Homme (1989), Parfum d'Elle (1990), Eau d'Or (1994), Suggestion Eau d'Argent (1994) and Just Me (1997). In 1996, in a deal with Montana licensee Parfac which included Azzaro Fragrances, Clarins acquired Parfums Montana for the equivalent of $154 million (US). There have been 39 perfumes and colognes released under the Montana name, with the last in 2024.

By 1988, Montana had softened his style. He had moved in most of his garments to a completely natural shoulder while still maintaining a commanding line, with stand-away waists, large collars and geometric trapeze shaping that extended to wide-hemmed pants, a silhouette he would focus on through the first half of 1989. At the end of the 80s, he returned to futuristic looks, joining a trend toward a 1960s Space Age revival, with sharply tailored suits featuring vivid colors, prominent zippers, stretch fabrics, and angular narrow shoulders.

In 1988, Montana was offered the position of artistic director for the House of Dior, an offer which he declined. In 1990, Montana was named artistic director of House of Lanvin and, through 1992, designed two women's collections, one cruisewear, two menswear, and two couture collections, which translated to seven shows in eleven months. In both years, he received the coveted Dés d'Or (Golden Thimble) Award and much critical acclaim. But his bold designs were financially disastrous for Lanvin, which lost an estimated $50 million, and Montana was replaced by Dominique Morlotti.

Montana changed manufacturers three times, leaving Genny for Gruppo GFT and, in 1996, switching to Groupe Mendes. Also in 1996, he launched a leather accessories division but, in 1997, he sought bankruptcy protection. In 1999, his company, and the rights to his name, were sold to an investment group led by the French businessman Jean-Jacques Layani. Under the deal, Montana was required to work for the new organization, Montana Trademarks, through 2008. In 1998, he launched a ready-to-wear line called Odyssée and, in 1999, Montana BLU, a sportswear and citywear line. Between financial turbulence, mismanagement and changes in fashion trends, these ventures also failed. When his contract was fulfilled, Montana retreated from the fashion world. He spent the next two years working on his autobiography and then briefly returned, designing several pieces for the 2013 collection of Éric Tibusch. For the rest of his life, he was a recluse. In 2014, the French government awarded him as Commandeur Ordre des Arts et des Lettres.

== Personal life and death ==
Montana was an art collector and owned homes in Paris and Capri. Through the 1980s and 1990s, he restored an 18th-century château near Chartres.

Montana was openly homosexual. From 1979 to 1993, he was in a relationship with makeup artist Bobby Butz, who stated that their relationship was abusive and marred by "rages". Montana was extremely shy and prone to being sullen; he also had a habit of disappearing for long periods of time without explanation. On 21 July 1993, Montana married the (female) American model Wallis Franken, a mutual friend of his and Butz. Franken and Montana had been friends for 18 years and she was his muse for many of his fashion innovations. They also shared an addiction to cocaine, which Montana used for most of his life. Throughout their relationship, Montana was known to be highly controlling, and to abuse Franken mentally, emotionally and physically, once beating her to the point where she was hospitalized. In June 1996, Wallis died after falling from the balcony of their third-floor Paris apartment. Police were aware of the history of abuse but the death was ruled a suicide, a verdict with which her family was satisfied.

Claude Montana died at Hôpital Bretonneau in Paris on 23 February 2024, of Alzheimer's disease, at the age of 76.

== Legacy ==
Upon his death, Fédération de la Haute Couture et de la Mode president Bruno Pavlovsky said: "The work of Claude Montana embodied exceptional craftsmanship. His daring creations influenced a whole generation of designers. His distinctive style, blending sophistication and modernity, remains firmly rooted in the imagination of contemporary fashion, testifying to his indelible impact on the industry and on generations to come."

== Awards ==
- Best Women's Collection, Summer 1985, Paris
- Best European Designer, Fall/Winter 1987/88, Munchener Modewoche (Munich Fashion Week)
- Balenciaga Prize for Best Designer, 1988
- Golden Thimble Award, 1990, 1991
- Commandeur Ordre des Arts et des Lettres, 2014

== Images ==
- Claude Montana: The King of 80s Power Dressing

== Sources ==
- Montana Website
- Claude Montana at infomat.com.
- Claude Montana at Fédération Française de la Couture.
