= Dynamix (disambiguation) =

Dynamix was an American video game developer from 1984 to 2001.

Dynamix may also refer to:

- Dynamix (band), an electronica and dance music duo
- Mark Dynamix, an Australian DJ
- Dynamix (video game), a 2014 Hong Kong music game developed by C4Cat

== See also ==
- Dynamics
