= Prize of the Böttcherstraße in Bremen =

German art award

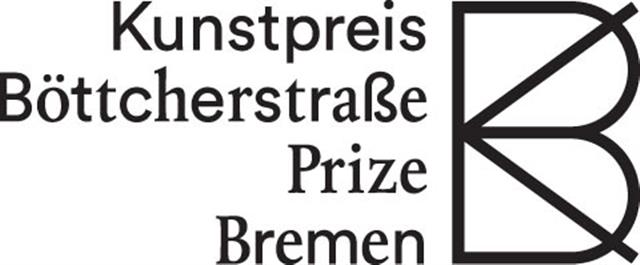
Logo of the Prize of the Böttcherstraße in Bremen

The “Prize of the Böttcherstraße in Bremen” (Kunstpreis der Böttcherstraße in Bremen) is a German award in the field of contemporary art that was first presented in 1954, making it one of the oldest awards of its kind. According to the Prize's rules, the award is “intended to honour visual artists living in the German speaking area who have not yet received a public distinction of a kind corresponding to the quality of their work”. From 1985 to 1991, the award was called "Bremer Kunstpreis".

== Background ==
Every two years, ten international curators each nominate an artist who is then invited to participate in an exhibition, hosted by the Kunsthalle Bremen. A catalogue accompanies the exhibition. During the course of the show, an international five-member jury selects the winner of the award.

The prize money of 30.000 Euro is provided by the Donors’ Circle (Stifterkreis für den Kunstpreis der Böttcherstraße in Bremen), an independent organization within the Bremen Art Association (Kunstverein in Bremen). The Prize of the Böttcherstraße in Bremen therefore ranks amongst the most highly endowed awards for contemporary art in Germany.

The Donors’ Circle also supports the acquisition of a work by the winner of the prize for the collection of the Kunsthalle Bremen. Works by awardees Martin Honert, Ólafur Elíasson, Wolfgang Tillmans, Tino Sehgal, Ulla von Brandenburg and Tea Jorjadze, among others, have thus entered the museum's collection.

== History and awardees ==
During the course of its existence, the Prize of the Böttcherstraße in Bremen changed its name twice. Originally founded as "Kunstpreis der Böttcherstraße", it was renamed "Bremer Kunstpreis" in 1985. Since 1993 the award is known as "Kunstpreis der Böttcherstraße in Bremen".

=== "Kunstpreis der Böttcherstraße in Bremen" (1993-present) ===
Award	Year	Duration of the exhibition	Nominees (Nominators)	Jury	Awardee
Kunstpreis der Böttcherstraße in Bremen	2020	August 29 – November 1	Bani Abidi, Berlin (Natasha Ginwala); Nevin Aladağ, Berlin (Johan Holten); Jesse Darling, Berlin/London (Dr. Andrea Schlieker); Toulu Hassani, Hanover (Stifterkreis des Kunstpreis der Böttcherstraße); Janine Jembere, Vienna (Dr. Yvette Mutumba); Anne Duk Hee Jordan, Berlin (Dr. Bonaventure Soh Bejeng Ndikung); Ulrike Müller, New York (Prof. Dr. Christoph Grunenberg); Henrike Naumann, Berlin (Severin Dünser); Raphaela Vogel, Berlin (Thomas D. Trummer); Stefan Vogel, Leipzig (Prof. Dr. Bettina Steinbrügge)	Yilmaz Dziewior, director of the Museum Ludwig, Cologne; Stephanie Rosenthal, director of the Gropius Bau, Berlin; Christoph Ruckhäberle, artist, Leipzig; Susanne Titz, director of the Museum Abteiberg, Mönchengladbach	Ulrike Müller

- 2018 Arne Schmitt
- 2016 Emeka Ogboh
- 2014 Nina Beier
- 2012 Daniel Knorr
- 2009 Tea Jorjadze
- 2007 Ulla von Brandenburg
- 2005 Clemens von Wedemeyer
- 2003 Tino Sehgal
- 2001 Heike Aumüller
- 1999 Olaf Nicolai
- 1997 Ólafur Elíasson
- 1995 Wolfgang Tillmans
- 1993 Martin Honert

=== "Bremer Kunstpreis" (1985-1991) ===
- 1991 Thomas Lehnerer
- 1989 Stephan Balkenhol
- 1987 Eberhard Boßlet
- 1985 Martin Disler

=== "Kunstpreis der Böttcherstraße" (1955-1983) ===
- 1983 Antonius Höckelmann, Cologne
- 1982 Mechthild Nemeczek, Cologne
- 1981 Alf Schuler, Cologne
- 1980 Martin Rosz, Berlin, Walter Stöhrer, Berlin
- 1979 Rebecca Horn, Hamburg
- 1978 Dorothee von Windheim, Hamburg
- 1977 Wolfgang Nestler, Aachen
- 1976 László Lakner, Berlin
- 1975 Jürgen Brodwolf, Vogelbach, Günther Knipp, Munich
- 1974 Ursula Sax, Berlin, Max Kaminski, Berlin
- 1973 Hermann Waldenburg, Berlin
- 1972 Klaus Fußmann, Berlin
- 1971 Uli Pohl, Bremen
- 1970 Hansjerg Maier-Aichen, Leinfelden
- 1969 Dieter Krieg, Baden-Baden, Michael Schoenholtz
- 1968 Hans Baschang, Karlsruhe
- 1967 Gerlinde Beck, Großglattbach, Helga Föhl, Wiesbaden
- 1966 Jens Lausen, Hamburg
- 1965 Karl Goris, Hamburg
- 1964 Ekkehard Thieme, Flensburg
- 1963 Sigrid Kopfermann, Düsseldorf
- 1962 Ruth Robbel, Berlin
- 1961 Günter Ferdinand Ris, Oberpleis/Siebengebirge
- 1960 Erhart Mitzlaff, Fischerhude
- 1959 Rudolf Kügler, Berlin
- 1958 Horst Skodlerrak, Lübeck
- 1957 Fritz Koenig, Ganslberg/Landshut
- 1956 Ernst Weiers, Bernried/Starnberg
- 1955 Hans Meyboden, Freiburg im Breisgau
