= Walter Stöhrer =

German painter

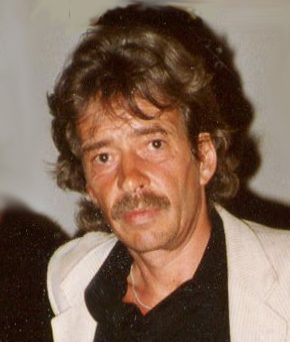
- Stöhrer in 1978
- Born: 15 January 1937; Stuttgart
- Died: 10 April 2000 (aged 63); Scholderup, Schleswig-Holstein, Germany
- Education: Academy of Fine Arts, Karlsruhe
- Occupations: Painter; Academic teacher
- Organization: Berlin University of the Arts
- Awards: Berliner Kunstpreis; Villa Romana Prize

Walter Stöhrer (1937–2000) was a German painter, graphic artist and academic teacher at the Berlin University of the Arts from 1986 until his death.

== Life and career ==
Born in Stuttgart on 15 January 1937, Stöhrer grew up in several places in the Black Forest, due to World War II, until the family settled in Karlsruhe. He was determined to become a painter early but was too young for formal studies. He was an apprentice in commercial graphical art from 1952 to 1954. In 1956 he began to study at the Academy of Fine Arts, Karlsruhe, first graphic art with Hans Gaenssken, and then painting in the class of HAP Grieshaber from 1957.

In 1959 Stöhrer left for Berlin where he lived and worked as a freelance artist. He became a member of the Deutscher Künstlerbund, participating at its annual exhibitions in 1964 in Berlin and in 1971 in Stuttgart. Stöhrer became a member of the Academy of Arts, Berlin in 1984. Between 1981 and 1982 he was visiting professor at the Hochschule der Künste in Berlin (now the Berlin University of the Arts) where he became professor in 1986.

Stöhrer created abstract art, often inspired by literature such as works by André Breton and Rolf Dieter Brinkmann. When he moved to Berlin he first focused on etching, providing the elements of lines and gesture. He developed a combination of writing, drawing and painting. His works were exhibited in Europe and New York City.

Stöhrer died in Scholderup on 10 April 2000, at the age of 63.

== Awards ==
Stöhrer received awards including:

- 1962 German Youth Art Prize of Stuttgart
- 1964 Deutscher Kritikerpreis, Berlin
- 1971 Will-Grohmann-Preis, Berlin
- 1976 Berliner Kunstpreis
- 1977 Villa Romana Prize
- 1980 Prize of the Böttcherstraße in Bremen
- 1982 Kunstpreis der Stadt Nordhorn
- 1995 Hans Molfenter Prize, Stuttgart
- 1999 Jerg Ratgeb Prize of the HAP Grieshaber Foundation
- 2000 Kunstpreis der Schleswig-Holsteinischen Wirtschaft

The Walter Stöhrer-Stiftung (Walter Stöhrer-Foundation) is (as of 2003) working on an edition of his collected writings on art. It awards a prize in his name for graphic art students of the Berlin University of the Arts and the State Academy of Fine Arts Stuttgart, alternating annually between the institutions. One of his paintings belongs to the Bundestag parliament.
