= Éric Tibusch =

French fashion designer

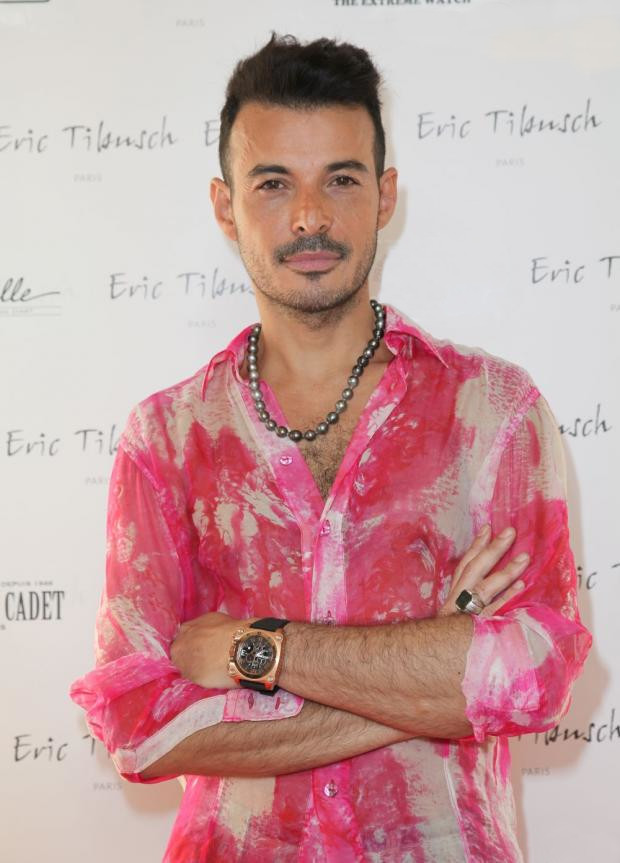
- Born: January 6, 1972; France
- Occupation: Fashion designer

Éric Tibusch (born 6 January 1972) is a French fashion designer. He founded his own couture house in 2006 and has presented collections internationally. During his career he has developed projects in Europe, North Africa and Asia. In 2026, he was appointed creative director of the historic couture house Maggy Rouff as part of its revival.

== Early life ==
Éric Tibusch was born in 1972 in France and grew up between Corsica and Tahiti before moving to Paris, where he trained in fashion. Early in his career he worked with Jean-Paul Gaultier.

== Career ==
In 2005, Tibusch joined a fashion development program linked to Kopenhagen Fur.

In 2006 he launched his own couture label and was appointed artistic director of the fashion house Jacques Fath.

Since the mid-2000s he has presented collections within and alongside the official Haute couture and Ready-to-wear calendars. His work has been described as combining experimentation with materials, futuristic influences and references to craftsmanship.

During the late 2000s and early 2010s he developed projects in fashion, jewellery and stage costumes while continuing to present collections during Paris Fashion Week periods.

== International activity ==
Tibusch has participated in fashion events in several countries and has developed projects combining French design with international production.

From 2014 he developed part of his activity in China, working with industrial partners while continuing his couture work in Europe.

In 2018 he stated that he continued consulting work in Asia while developing his own label.

== Fashion shows ==
Tibusch has presented collections regularly since 2006, often through independent shows during Haute couture and fashion week periods.

In July 2013, designer Claude Montana collaborated on Tibusch's autumn-winter couture collection, contributing several looks to the show.

== Collaborations ==
During his career, Tibusch has collaborated with brands and artists in jewellery, beauty, cinema and television.

He designed costumes inspired by the film Avatar for the international DVD and Blu-ray release of the film.

In 2014 he designed outfits for the finalists of the Miss France 2015 competition.

== Recent developments ==
In 2026, Tibusch was appointed creative director of the historic French couture house Maggy Rouff as part of a project to relaunch the brand and reintroduce it on the contemporary fashion scene.
