= Static =

Static may refer to:

== Places ==
- Static Nunatak, in Antarctica
- Static, Kentucky and Tennessee, U.S.
- Static Peak, a mountain in Wyoming, U.S.
  - Static Peak Divide, a mountain pass near the peak

== Science and technology ==
=== Physics ===
- Static electricity, a net charge of an object
  - Triboelectric effect, due to frictional contact between different materials
- Static spacetime, a spacetime having a global, non-vanishing, timelike Killing vector field which is irrotational
- Statics, a branch of physics concerned with physical systems in equilibrium
  - Hydrostatics, the branch of fluid mechanics that studies fluids at rest

=== Engineering ===
- Static pressure, in aircraft instrumentation and fluid dynamics
  - Static port, a proprietary sensor used on aircraft to measure static pressure
- White noise or static noise, a random signal with a flat power spectral density
  - Radio noise, in radio reception
  - Noise (video), the random black-and-white image produced by televisions attempting to display a weak or incoherent signal

=== Computing ===
- Static build, a compiled version of a program which has been statically linked against libraries
- Static logic, digital logic which does not use a clock signal; See Dynamic logic
  - Static core, a CPU entirely implemented in static logic
- Static library, or statically-linked library, a set of routines, external functions and variables which are resolved in a caller at compile-time
- Static method, a method of a class that does not need an explicit object reference
- Static IP, an IP address
- Static route, a network route specified by local configuration, rather than being automatically determined by protocols that automatically assign routes
- Static random-access memory, a type of semiconductor memory which retains its contents as long as power is applied
- Static type checking, where type checking is applied at compile-time, not run-time
- Static variable, a variable whose lifetime is the entire run of the program
  - Static (keyword)
- Static web page
- Static web design, a web design which offers a layout that cannot adapt to viewer needs

== Arts and entertainment ==
=== Music ===
==== Artists ====
- Static Major (1974–2008), an American R&B singer and songwriter, originally known as Static
- Static-X, an American industrial metal band
  - Wayne Static (1965–2014), frontman, vocalist and guitarist of Static-X
- Static, one half of the American music duo Collide
- Static (born 1990), one half of the Israeli music duo Static & Ben El Tavori
- DJ Static (disambiguation), the name of various DJs

==== Albums ====
- Static (Bleach album), 1998, and the title song
- Static (Cults album), 2013
- Static (Huntress album), 2015, and the title song
- Static (Planet Funk album), 2006, and the title song
- Static, a 2017 album by Dave Kerzner
- Static, a 1999 live album by Mr. Big
- Statik (album), an album by Actress

==== Songs ====
- "Static", by Godspeed You! Black Emperor from Lift Your Skinny Fists like Antennas to Heaven, 2000
- "Static" (James Brown song), 1988
- "Static", by Livin Out Loud from the album What About Us, 2006
- "Static", by Planet P Project from the album Planet P Project, 1983
- "Static", by Sahara Hotnights on What If Leaving Is a Loving Thing, 2007
- "Static" (Sleep Theory song), 2025
- "Static" (Steve Lacy song), 2022
- "Static Mix, Pt. 1" and "Static Mix, Pt. 2", by Tupac Shakur, from Beginnings: The Lost Tapes 1988–1991

=== Fictional characters ===
- Static character, a character who does not undergo significant change during the course of a story
- Static (DC Comics), a Milestone and DC Comics superhero
- Static (Eclipse Comics), a superhero created by writer-artist Steve Ditko

=== Film and television ===
- Static (1985 film), an American comedy-drama film
- Static (2012 film), an American horror film
- "Static" (The Twilight Zone), a 1961 episode of The Twilight Zone

=== Radio ===
- A program on Australian community radio station 2SER

== See also ==
- Static program analysis, a set of methods for analyzing code without running it
