= NASCAR Kinetics =

NASCAR outreach program

NASCAR Kinetics: Marketing in Motion was established in 2009 with the mission of connecting college students nationwide to NASCAR. The program gave participants insight on possible career paths, and was meant to help develop their ability to collaborate with other students. Weekly assignments and projects were based on real-world challenges and opportunities facing NASCAR and its sponsors.

The winner of the fall 2011 semester of NASCAR Kinetics: Marketing in Motion was the University of Central Florida.

NASCAR Kinetics: Marketing in Motion mentored its last round on college students in 2013. During its four-year history, many graduates of the program earned sports, sports marketing and business internships and full-time jobs, some with NASCAR itself.

== 2012 spring semester participating universities ==
- Belmont Abbey College
- Centenary College
- Central Michigan University
- Coastal Carolina University
- East Tennessee State University
- High Point University
- Indiana State University
- Ohio State University
- Ohio University
- Oklahoma State University
- Southern New Hampshire University
- Troy University
- University of Central Florida
- University of Florida
- University of Miami
- University of Oregon
- Virginia State University
