= Len Dobbin =

Leonard Montgomery Ross Dobbin (February 23, 1935 – July 9, 2009) was a jazz radio broadcaster and critic. A native of Montreal, Quebec, Canada, Dobbin was involved with many Montreal jazz music events for decades and was active in the jazz community as a broadcaster, radio producer, reviewer and photographer. Dobbin's jazz photographs had four showings in the years prior to his death, and can be found in many magazines and album covers. Dobbin also wrote liner notes for jazz releases.

Dobbin's radio career began in 1962. During the 1970s, Dobbin's Sunday evening radio show "Jazz 96" introduced many Canadian jazz artists to the public. Subsequently, he hosted a show called "Dobbin's Den", which aired on McGill University campus radio station CKUT-FM on Sundays from 11a.m.-1p.m.

Dobbin also wrote about and reviewed jazz music for the Montreal Mirror, the Montreal Gazette and CODA.

Dobbin developed relationships with major jazz artists, including baritone saxophonist Pepper Adams, who composed a tune titled "Dobbin" in his honor, and the vocalist Sheila Jordan who, upon hearing of his death, was quoted as saying that he was "like a younger brother to me.... I will dedicate "The Crossing" at every performance I do to (Dobbin)...."

An almost lifelong battle with alcoholism ended in the mid 1990s when Dobbin achieved what was to become permanent sobriety with the help of Alcoholics Anonymous.

Dobbin suffered a stroke in July 2009 while sitting in a jazz club in Montreal. He was taken by ambulance to hospital where he died that night.

Among his awards was a nomination in 2009 for "Broadcaster of the Year" at the Canadian National Jazz Awards.
