= Starckdeutsch =

Artistic dialect of German by poet Matthias Koeppel

Starckdeutsch (literally, strong German, albeit with ck for k, as dictated by the conventions of the variant) is an imagined language created by Matthias Koeppel (1937–2026), a German painter and poet and self-proclaimed Sprachkünstler (artist of language). It exaggerates stereotypical (mostly phonetic and orthographic) traits of older stages of German and some modern (especially Upper German) dialects in an impressionistic way, rather than in a rigorously systematic fashion.

Matthias Koeppel started to write humorous poems in "Starckdeutsch" in 1972. A collection of them was published as Starckdeutsch. Sämtliche Gedichte in 1981.
