= DJ Static =

DJ Static is the name used by a number of DJs around the world:

- DJ Static (Canadian DJ) (born 1977), Canadian DJ and radio personality
- DJ Static (Danish DJ), Danish DJ, producer and event organizer
- Static Revenger, American DJ and producer
- Statik Selektah (born 1982), American record producer and DJ
