= WEFUNK Radio =

Radio show at McGill University, Montreal

WEFUNK is a weekly radio show on Montreal's campus/community radio station CKUT 90.3 FM, on air since 1996 and online since 1999. The name of the radio show comes from the Parliament song "P. Funk (Wants to Get Funked Up)", in which WEFUNK is a fictional radio station broadcasting "directly from the Mothership, top of the Chocolate Milky Way, 500,000 kilowatts of P Funk-power."

WEFUNK expanded to include its own internet radio stream in 1999, becoming one of the oldest continuously operating radio streams on the Internet, as well as one of the longest-running online radio shows. Since 2001, Apple has featured WEFUNK in its iTunes radio directory, introducing the show to a large worldwide audience.

== Website ==
WEFUNK first began offering the show online via co-host Professor Groove's Funk website "The Groove Juicer" in 1999. The WEFUNK Radio website (wefunkradio.com) was launched in 2000 and is home to WEFUNK's radio stream, new episodes, and a comprehensive archive of episodes spanning back to 2001.

=== Show Archives ===
Since 1999, episodes of WEFUNK are recorded, cataloged and made available for online streaming. Each published show includes a playlist listing the songs that were played, including interviews and live freestyling sessions.

Prior to 2002, the shows hosts were not always diligent with the note-keeping process. This led to a good number of shows in the archive for which either a limited playlist or no playlist was available. Johnathan James started the WEFUNK Playlist Project, which sifted through the shows to identify many of songs featured. Due in part to this collaborative effort, all shows are now complete with a playlist, with just a handful of songs still unidentified.

== Audience ==
By 2007, WEFUNK’s shows reached an estimated audience of at least ten thousand regular listeners. The program has maintained an ad-free, community-oriented approach, supported in part by contributions from longtime listeners.

== Involvement in early Internet radio ==
Streaming audio of WEFUNK episodes was first available in February 1999 with the launch of CKUT's radio stream, and expanded later that year with WEFUNK's independently operated radio stream dedicated to their own shows. Some credit the Australian program The Vinyl Lounge as the longest running internet radio show); they launched on NetFM.net in November 1998, about three months earlier than WEFUNK.

Prior to the popularity of podcasting, WEFUNK provided mp3 downloads of its shows beginning in 1999—first via FTP, then HTTP downloads. Podcasts were offered from 2004-2006. The extent of WEFUNK's catalog, combined with easy access to download episodes to digital audio players, led to attention in the press as podcasting gained popularity.

== Recognition and critical response ==
WEFUNK was awarded "College Radio Show of the Year" in 2007 at the Stylus DJ Awards, a Canadian nationwide urban music awards event. WEFUNK was voted into the Montreal Mirror's top 10 "Best Local Radio Show" lists in their annual "Best of Montreal" reader's poll in 2009, 2008, 2006, 2005, and 2004. Esquire magazine noted WEFUNK for "grooves so gloriously nasty, they make James Brown look like Pat Boone". The New Haven Advocate wrote, "If you're looking for 'brash funk hypeness, hip-hop deep in the pocket,' screw the mainstream. This is it." Fortune Magazine wrote, "WeFunkRadio.com is just totally beautiful!" Wired magazine wrote that WEFUNK "keeps us going strong".
