= Operation Kinetic =

Operation Kinetic may refer to

- A Royal Navy operation during the Battle of Audierne Bay, on the French Atlantic coast in 1944
- Operation Kinetic (1999), a Canadian Army action in the Kosovo conflict in 1999
