= CKUT-FM =

Campus radio station of McGill University in Montreal, Canada

- Montreal, Quebec; Canada
- Broadcast area: Greater Montreal area
- Frequency: 90.3 MHz
- Branding: 90.3 FM CKUT Montreal

Programming
- Format: Campus and community
- Affiliations: Pacifica Radio Network

Ownership
- Owner: Radio CKUT (non-profit organisation)

History
- First air date: 1985 as CFRM (Radio McGill); November 16, 1987 as CKUT-FM

Technical information
- Class: B
- ERP: 5,003 watts horizontal polarization only
- HAAT: 242.5 meters (796 ft)
- Transmitter coordinates: 45°30′20.16″N 73°35′30.12″W

Links
- Website: http://www.ckut.ca

CKUT-FM is a non-profit, member-owned and -operated campus and community radio station that broadcasts from McGill University in Montreal, Quebec, Canada. It can be heard at 90.3 FM in Montreal and online at its website, 24 hours a day, 365 days a year.

CKUT's FM signal, broadcast from a tower on the top of Mount Royal, reaches as far as the Eastern Townships and upstate New York.

CKUT-FM has its roots in McGill University's radio club, founded in 1921, and then in the closed-circuit station CFRM on the campus of McGill University. It started broadcasting on FM on November 16, 1987.

Its mandate is to be a "mic for the mic-less" – to provide an essential service to those in the Montreal community whose needs are not met by mainstream commercial radio. The station is financially supported by donations and a McGill student fee levy.

== History ==
CKUT began as CFRM-Radio McGill, a closed-circuit cable station operating out of the Shatner Building on McGill's downtown campus in Montreal, Quebec, starting in 1985.

In 1986, CFRM was among several Montreal radio stations that applied for an available FM frequency, supported by McGill Law professor Dr. F.H. Buckley. The station was able to demonstrate local support through letter-writing and door-knocking campaigns, and on March 19, 1987, McGill undergraduate and station volunteer Martha-Marie Kleinhans, representing a company to be incorporated, received a licence to operate an English-language institutional FM station at McGill University, operating on the 90.3 MHz frequency with an effective radiated power of 5,700 watts.

== Programs ==
=== Shows Currently On The Air ===
Among CKUT's many programs are:

- Bluegrass Ramblings, established by Ross Harvey in 1988; formerly hosted by Adam Schwarzenberg; currently hosted by Dara Weiss
- Country Classics Hour, established by Ross Harvey in 1991; currently hosted by Little Andy, Katie Moore, and Julia Kater
- Dromotexte, hosted by Fortner Anderson
- Dykes on Mykes, established in 1987
- The Free Kick Radio Show, hosted by Clara-Swan Kennedy
- Folk Directions, hosted by Gerry Goodfriend
- Grey Matters, hosted by Fortner Anderson
- Jazz Amuck hosted by john b since 1986
- International Radio Report, established in 1987, currently hosted by Sheldon Harvey & Gilles Letourneau
- Latin Time - Tiempo Latino, hosted by Sergio Martinez
- Macondo & el Club de los Feos, hosted by Juan-Carlos Quintana, DJ Irwin Franco, and Diego Puente "El Farandulero"
- Masters at Work, established in 1992 by Mike Mission and DJ Stone
- New Shit, a collective program hosted by the CKUT Music Department
- Off The Hook, hosted by DJ Buddablaze, Revolution and Flow
- Positive Vibes, hosted by Johnny Black, Roger Moore and Nadine, airing since 1986
- Prison Radio, an abolitionist program made in direct collaboration with people who are currently incarcerated, airing since 2010
- Queercorps, established in 1991 by Puelo Dier
- Radio is Dead, an improvisational volunteer-run program showcasing experimental radio production
- Roots, Rock and Reggae, hosted by Fluxy, Singing P, and Mr. Boom, airing since 1996
- Samedi Midi, hosted by Raymond Laurent
- The Weekend Groove, created by RonniLov hosted by Mikey Don, Everton Green
- Tranzister Radio, co-founded by Morgan Sea and airing since 2012
- Under the Olive Tree, Canada’s first radio show dedicated solely to Palestine, established in 2006
- Underground Sounds, hosted by Nick Schofield
- Voice of Korea
- WEFUNK, hosted by Professor Groove and DJ Static
- West Indian Rhythms, Montréal’s first and longest-running Caribbean culture radio program, established in 1982, hosted by Howard "Stretch" Carr & Faithlyn Sankar
- William Shatner's Whiskey Tears, hosted by the enigmatic and mysterious "Gary", along with a collective of McGill students and alumni

==== Dykes on Mykes ====
Dykes on Mykes was founded in 1987 by Robyn Badger, Minty Fownes and Voula K to produce media that would both represent the diversity of the lesbian community, and would provide the opportunity for these communities to critically examine pertinent political and cultural issues, and was intended to alternate with the Homoshow to represent gay men. The show took place bi-weekly in English. In 2004, they turned the mics over to a new team which included Dayna McLeod, Mel Hogan and Marie Claire MacPhee. CKUT maintains a substantial archive of Dykes on Mykes. As of January 27, 2025, it has returned to the CKUT airwaves, now hosted by Becca Love.

==== International Radio Report ====
On the air since Thursday, November 19, 1987, the 30-minute show featuring news and information on all aspects of radio, radio broadcasting, and communications, locally, nationally and internationally, and is one of only a few shows to have been on CKUT continually since it obtained its FM license. The show was created by Sheldon Harvey, who continues to co-host and co-produce to this day, with current co-host Gilles Letourneau. The crew on the show has changed from time to time over the years, including Bill Westenhaver, Richard Casavant, Janice Laws, Steve Karlock, and David Asselin. International Radio Report originally aired on Thursday afternoons at 2:30, but after several years moved to the Sunday morning, 10:30 am time slot. The show has a Facebook Group "International Radio Report" with over 950 members, and a YouTube channel "International Radio Report", now with over 900 subscribers, that allows everyone the opportunity to tune in and listen to editions of the program on their own time schedule.

==== Macondo & el Club de los Feos ====
Macondo & el Club de los Feos "Macondo & El Club de los Feos" is a two-hour show in English, French and Spanish that plays Latin music, Salsa, merengue Bachata and Ballads. The show is divided in 4 segments: El set de Salsa Clásica pal que sabe y el que no que aprenda / El Haha Mix, Las novedades / La Pausa Cuchi Cuchi / Aqui mando yo (we play what you want).

==== Positive Vibes ====
One of the longest-running shows on CKUT, originated by Janice Dayle “J.D”, in 1986 (pre-FM licence) and arguably, opening the door to other Caribbean, Afro-centric programmes. It has had various other hosts over the years including Sistah P (Pat Dillon, currently host of Bhum Bhum Time) Prym Tyme, and Majesty. The current hosts are Johnny Black, Roger Moore and Nadine. Montreal’s reggae matrix, they play all forms of reggae, roots, rub a dub, ska, dancehall, vintage, rarities and keep reggae lovers informed of all the events happening in Montreal.

==== Underground Sounds ====
Underground Sounds broadcasts Montreal music on CKUT Mondays 8-10pm, and has been airing since 1987. Host Nick Schofield features new music from emerging artists, focusing on upcoming concerts and album releases through interviews, live performances and playlists. In 2014, Cult Montreal readers voted Schofield #1 Radio Host and Underground Sounds #1 Radio Show in Montreal.

==== Voice of Korea ====
Voice of Korea (not to be confused with the North Korean shortwave radio service of same name) is an hour-long program broadcast every Tuesday at 2PM. Entirely created by volunteers composed of 1st and 2nd-generation Koreans as well as other Asians, Voice of Korea features content for both the local Korean community and local residents through its bilingual (English and Korean) programming. Each show contains International News, Local Korean Community News, Weekly Event Calendar, Korean Movie Preview, Korean Culture Feature Story, Language Exchange for learning Korean and French and Top 5 Korean movies and songs for the week.

=== Past Shows No Longer On The Air ===
- AACK!!, hosted by Lorrie Edmonds (on air 1988-2013)
- Amandla, a weekly African current affairs program founded in 1987 in response to racist and misleading mainstream media coverage of South Africa (on air until 2024)
- Caravan, hosted by Samaa Elibyari
- Dobbin's Den, hosted by Len Dobbin
- Eugene Weems Presents, hosted by Eugene Edgar Weems (CFRM era)
- LegalEase, hosted by a collective of McGill law students
- Movement Museum, hosted by Chris 'Zeke' Hand, Finn Upham and Jon Crellin.
- No I'm Iron Man, hosted by Dan Maxham and Matthew Maxham
- Native Solidarity News, hosted by the Native Solidarity News Collective
- Roots Rock Rebel, hosted by Aaron Lakoff
- Shtetl on the Shortwave, established in 2007 and hosted by Tamara Kramer
- Sigaw ng Bayan MTL, hosted by the Sigaw ng Bayan Radio Collective
- Spitfiyah! Women of Colour Radio
- The Friday Morning After, hosted by Craig Sauve, Josh Hind, Ken McMurray and Amie Watson
- The Tuesday Morning After, hosted by Scott Erik, Elena Razlogova & Oz Cohen
- Where's the Beat?, hosted by Eliot Handelman with Andie Sigler, and Aj
- Your Radio is Broken, hosted by Dj Melon and Rhys Taylor

==== Roots Rock Rebel ====
Roots Rock Rebel was a weekly music program hosted by Aaron Lakoff, which featured ska, reggae, soul, and punk music. The show began in an overnight time-slot in 2003 under the name "Rude Rude Radio", and moved into its time slot in January 2006 under the name "Roots Rock Rebel". Some of the legendary ska and reggae artists who have been interviewed on Roots Rock Rebel include Lynn Taitt of The Skatalites, Pauline Black of The Selecter, and Hopeton Lewis, who is often credited as the originator of the rocksteady genre. The program aired Wednesday nights from 10pm-12am between 2006 and 2015, at which point it became The Rebel Beat, also hosted by Lakoff.

=== Special Programming ===
- The Homelessness Marathon, an annual live national radio broadcast about homelessness, housing issues and poverty, founded in 2002.
- Gay Day, a day of broadcasting dedicated to showcasing queer voices in protest of the homophobic murder of Montreal queer activist Joe Rose, founded on May 13, 1989.
- Black Talk, a Black History Month takeover made in collaboration with McGill’s Black Student Network since 1990.
