= Ulla von Brandenburg =

German artist

Ulla von Brandenburg (born 1974 in Karlsruhe) is a German artist. She lives and works in Paris.

She shows her work internationally and is one of the four finalists nominated for the Marcel Duchamp Prize in 2016.

== Background ==
Ulla von Brandenburg was trained in Germany at Karlsruhe University of Arts and Design in scenography. She also studied visual arts at the University of Fine Arts of Hamburg. She benefited from an artist residency at Cité internationale des arts in Paris, in 2007, 2008, et 2009.

== Artistic approach ==
Ulla von Brandenburg's work is inspired by literature, theatre and psychoanalysis. She is interested in the iconography of the XIX Century, in the history of technology and in the industrial revolution.

She uses a wide variety of media and techniques, including video, performance, theater, mural painting, drawing and fabric layouts. Ulla von Brandenburg declares that "I get the idea for a work at the same time as the appropriate format for that work".

If she favours black and white for her videos, it is in colour that her visual works are expressed. An architectural colour for her curtains, installations of fabrics, pictures of ribbons with shimmering fabrics or even coloured paper cut. A faded colour for her watercolors of ghostly characters.

Ulla von Brandenburg's works raise the matter of representation and it is through the style and language of theater and scenography that she builds many of her projects. The scenic elements, the curtains of the Commedia dell'arte, the costumes of Harlequin, and so on, are all references that allow her works to go from reality to fiction or illusion.

Her installations unfold like decorations that are often perceived by inverting the setting and in which one enter through curtains. The curtain is a fundamental motif in her work, which she describes as follows: "As the mirror has two sides, the one that reflects us and the one that is hidden behind, the curtain has two sides too. At the circus you can fold it up in a very small size and unfold it to bring a marquee out of it. I like to camouflage or change the space with poor or very simple means to create an elsewhere. Fabric is the ideal medium, inexpensive, easy to transport, modular. It’s a nomadic material."

The other recurring motif of her work is the forest, that can be found in her videos (such as Chorspiel) and her works in cut wallpaper. As with the curtain, this motif does not refer to a particular subject, but it refers "as much to Wagner and to Germany as to Tarkovski and to a common culture. Everywhere it corresponds to a universe, to tales, to the unconscious... ".

Her performances, in public or video, reveal the different facets of Ulla von Brandenburg's work: she writes the texts and the songs, she designs sets and costumes, chooses and directs the actors.

In February 2019, an exhibition at the Musée régional d'Art contemporain Occitanie, in Sérignan (Hérault), she presents her portraits of committed, learned and militant women.

== Personal exhibitions ==
- 2005 :
  - Künstlerstätte Schloss Bleckede, Germany
  - Der Brief, installation in public space, Berlin
  - I am making a crazy quilt and I want your face for the center, Pavilion Project, Montreal
  - Fuenf sind’s doch schon im ersten Spiel, Trottoir, Hamburg
- 2006 :
  - Cinq milliards d’années, Module 1, Palais de Tokyo, Paris
  - Kunsthalle, Zürich, Switzerland
- 2007 :
  - Karo Sieben, Galerie Art: Concept, Paris
  - Brief Oder Neuigkeiten, Produzentengalerie, Hamburg
- 2008 :
  - Whose beginning is not, nor end cannot be, Dublin
  - Project Space PS1, New York
  - Art Unlimited, Art 39 Basel
  - Passengers: 1.8: Ulla Von Brandenburg, CCA Wattis Institute for Contemporary Arts, San Francisco
  - Ulla von Brandenburg ? Wo über dem Grün ein rotes Netz liegt, Düsseldorf
  - La Maison, Docking Station project Space au Stedelijk Museum, Amsterdam
- 2009
  - Name or Number, Plateau - Frac Île-de-France, Paris
  - Wagon Wheel, Pilar Corrias Gallery, London
  - Chisenhale Gallery, London
- 2010 :
  - Neue Alte Welt, Galerie Art: Concept, Paris
  - Chorspiel, Lilith Performance Studio, Malmö, Sweden
  - K21 Kunstsammlung Nordrhein-Westfalen, Düsseldorf
  - Galerie Saint-Séverin, Paris
- 2011 :
  - Das Versteck des W.L, Produzentengalerie, Hamburg
  - Vitrine de l’Antenne, Frac Île-de-France, Paris
  - Neue Alte Welt, The Common Guild, Glasgow
- 2012 :
  - Mirrorsong, Pilar Corrias Gallery, London
  - Le Chevalier inexistant, Rosascape, Paris
- 2013 :
  - Death of a King au Palais de Tokyo, Paris
  - Die Straße, Galerie Art: Concept, Paris
  - Innen ist nicht Aussen, Secession, Vienne
  - Kunstpreis Finkenwerder, Kunsthaus, Hamburg
  - Prospectif Cinéma, Centre Pompidou, Paris
  - Das Wertesck des W.L, Kunsthalle, Hamburger
  - Gleich, Gleich, Gleich, Kiosk, Gent, Belgium
  - Eigenschatten - Ombra Propria, Monitor, Rome
  - Following the Signs, Herzliya Museum, Herzliya, Israel
- 2014 :
  - 24 Filme, kein Schnitt, MAMCO, Genève, Genève
  - Inside is not outside, Kunstverein Hanover
- 2015 :
  - Zuvor wie Vorher, Produzentengalerie, Hamburg
  - Baisse-toi montagne, Lève-toi vallon au Kaaitheater, Bruxelles
  - Gestern ist auch morgen und heute ist wie hier, Kunstverein Kassel
  - Kalns, grimsti ! Ieleja celies ! (Baisse-toi montagne, Lève-toi vallon), kim? Contemporary Art Centre, Riga, Latvia
  - Ulla von Brandenburg : Objects Without Shadow, Pilar Corrias Gallery, London
  - Sink down mountain, Rise up valley, Performa, New York
- 2016 :
  - Orange meets blue, Kasia Michalski Gallery, Varsovie, Pologne
  - It Has a Golden Orange Sun and an Elderly Blue Moon, Darling Foundry, Canada
  - Sink down mountain, Rise up valley, The Common Guild, Glasgow, United Kingdom
  - Manchmal Ja, manchmal Nein, Haus Konstruktiv, Zürich, Switzerland
- 2018 :
  - Ulla von Brandenburg: Sweet Feast, Whitechapel Gallery, United Kingdom
- 2020 :
  - Das Was Ist, Palais de Tokyo, Paris

== Awards ==
- Begabtenstipendium der Dietzte-Stiftung, 2003
- Reisestipendium, Verein für Neue Kunst in Hamburg Stipendium Künstlerstätte Schloss Bleckede, 2005
- Juergen-Ponto-Stipendium, 2006
- Kunstpreis der Böttcherstraße in Bremen, 2007
- Finkenwerder Art Prize, 2013
- In 2016, she is one of the four finalists nominated for Marcel Duchamp Prize
- Kubus. Sparda-Kunstpreis, 2022
