= Hôpital Bretonneau =

- Assistance publique - Hôpitaux de Paris
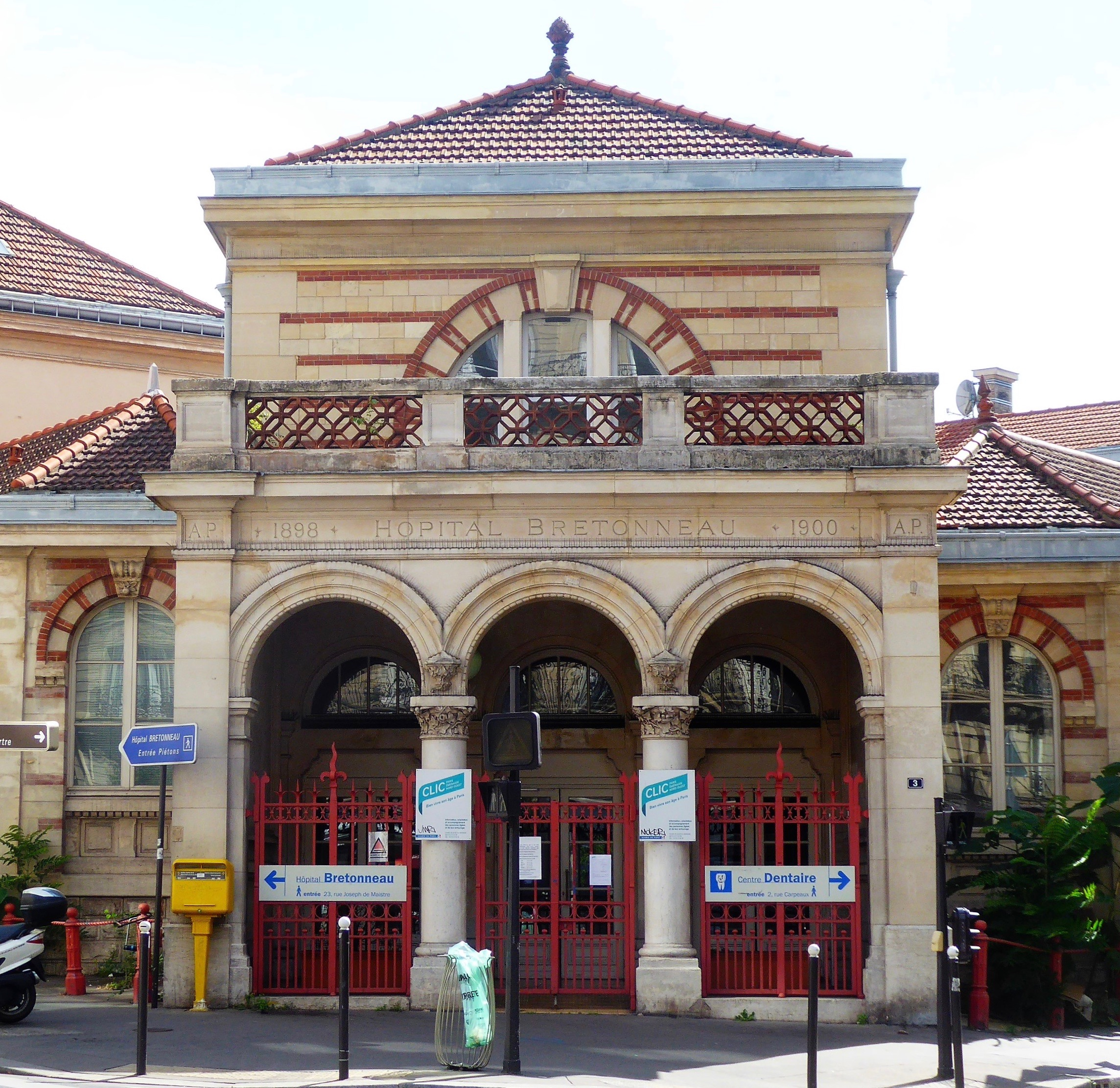
- Entrance of Hôpital Bretonneau

Geography
- Location: 18th arrondissement, Paris, France
- Coordinates: 48°53′24″N 2°19′49″E

Organisation
- Affiliated university: Université Paris Cité

History
- Opened: 1901

Links
- Website: hopital-bretonneau.aphp.fr
- Lists: Hospitals in France

The Hôpital Bretonneau is a hospital of the Assistance Publique–Hôpitaux de Paris (AP-HP) located in the 18th arrondissement of Paris.

It was designed by the architect Paul Héneux.

This hospital bears the name of Pierre Bretonneau, a French doctor from the beginning of the 19th century, offered pediatric care.
