= Fonderie Darling =

- Fonderie Darling
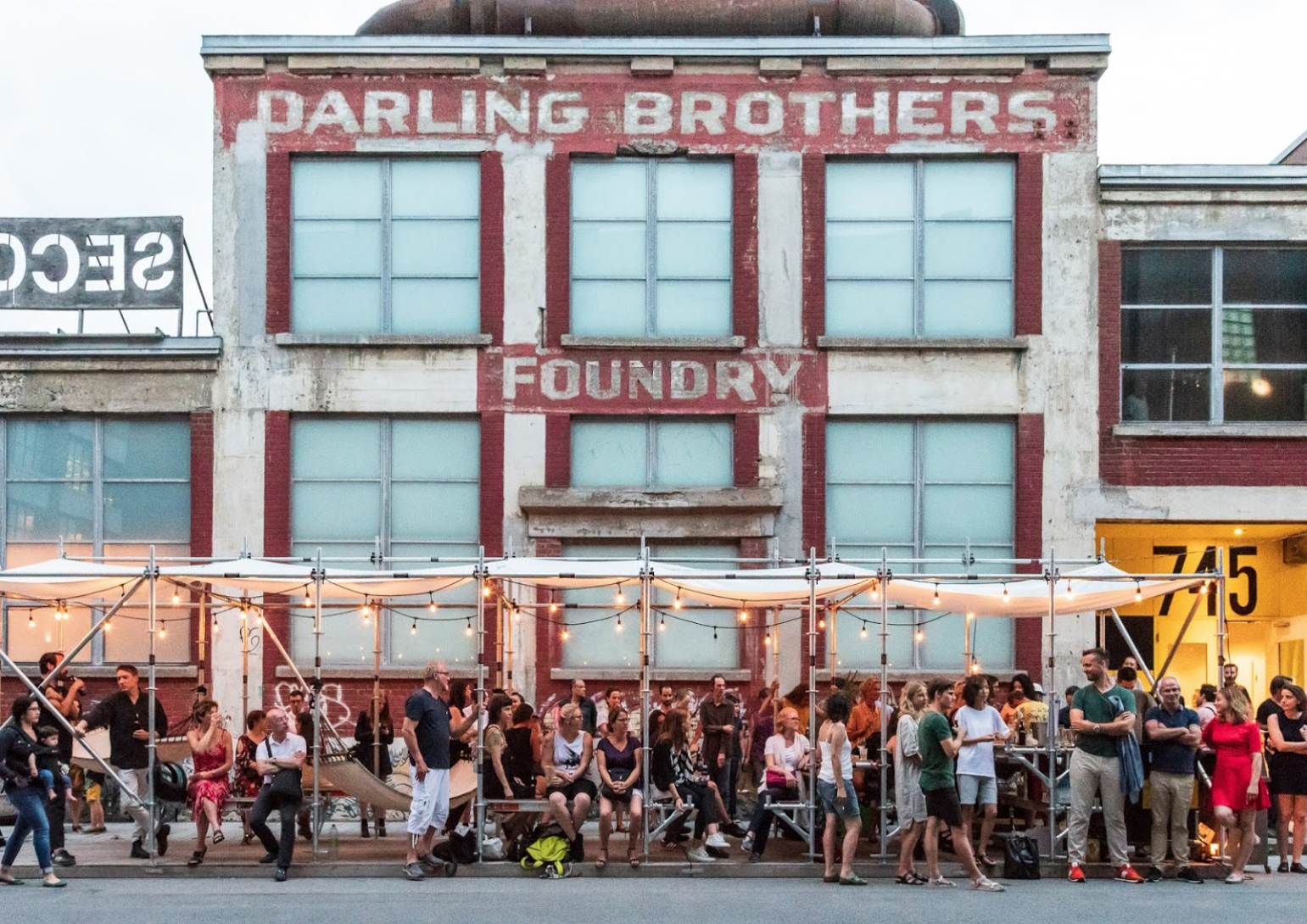

- Location of the Fonderie Darling in Montreal
- Established: 2002
- Location: 745, rue Ottawa; Montreal, Quebec, Canada
- Coordinates: 45°29′51.78″N 73°33′24.29″W
- Type: Visual Art Center
- Director: Caroline Andrieux
- Website: www.fonderiedarling.org

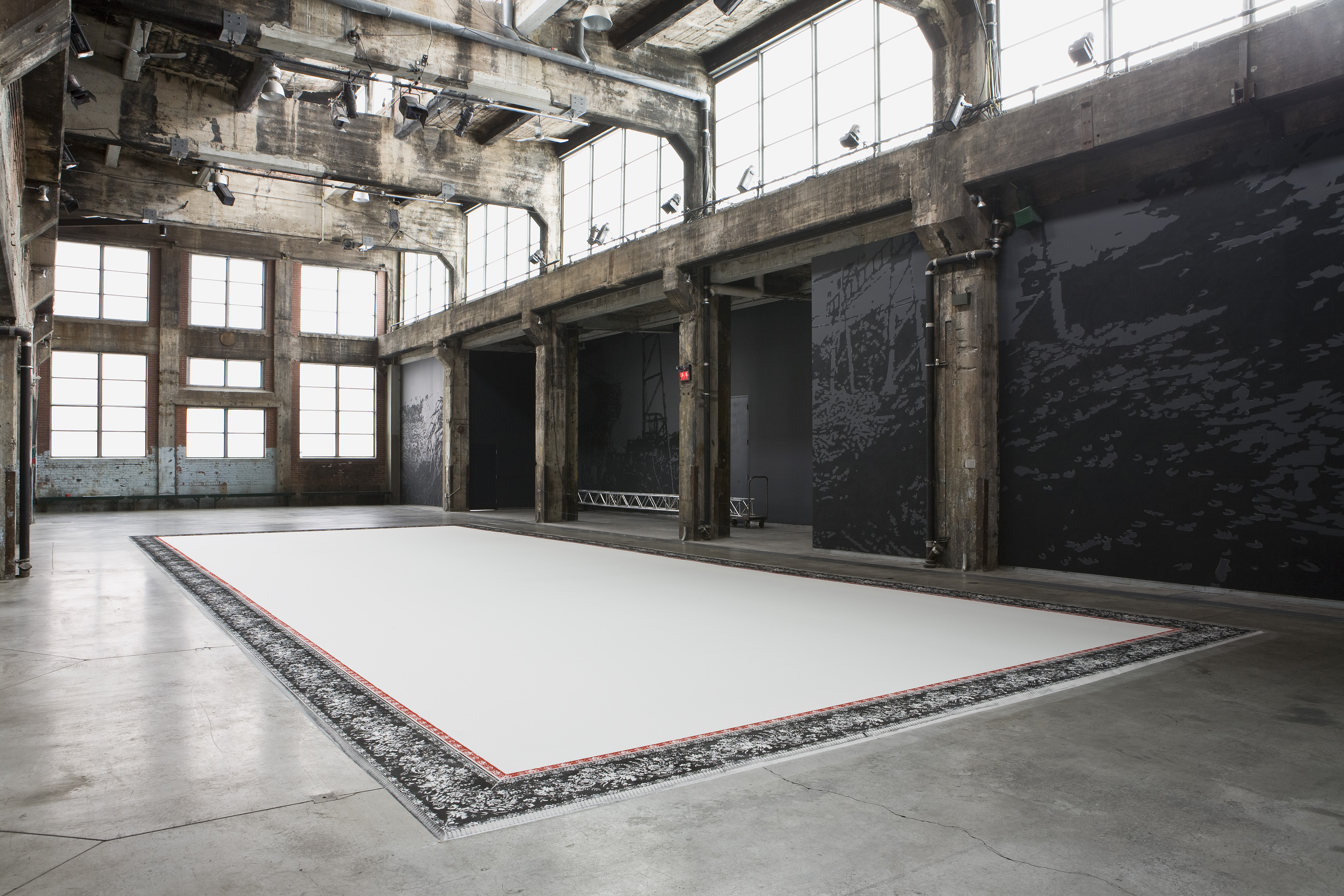
Inside Fonderie Darling, with "Tapis de Sucre 3" from Aude Moreau

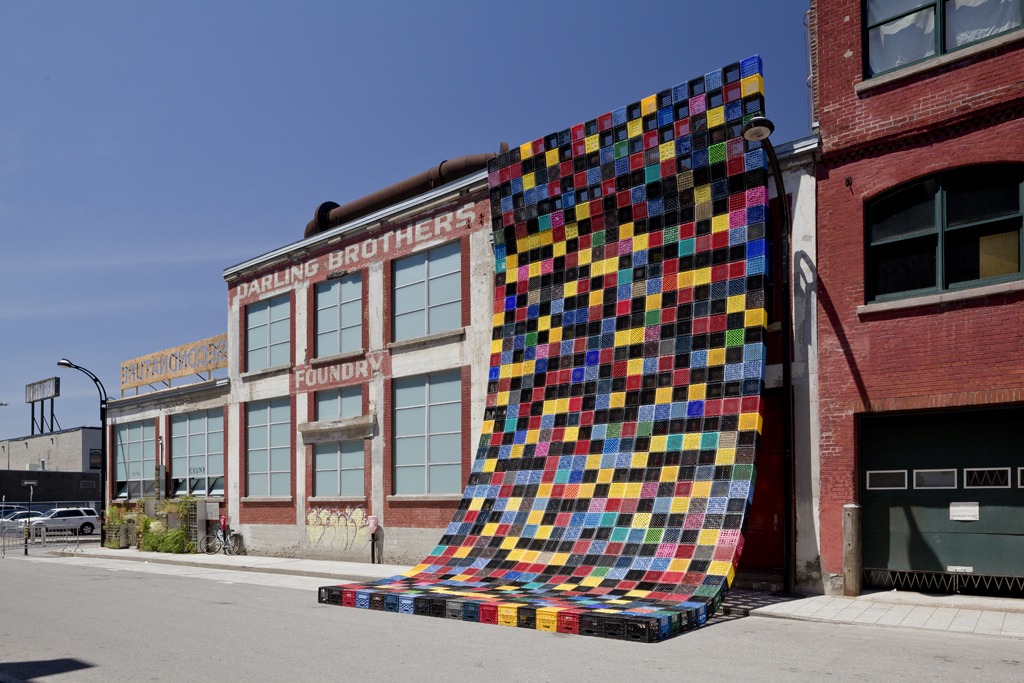
View from corner Ottawa and Queen, with Courte-Pointe from Philippe Allard and Justin Duchesneau

Fonderie Darling is a contemporary art complex located in the Cité du Multimédia district of Montreal, Quebec, Canada. Located in a former foundry, the complex consists of an art gallery and artists studios.

Its mission is to support the creation, production, and dissemination of visual art; it seeks at once to question the role of art and artists in the heart of the city, and to promote that role.

== Description ==
Fonderie Darling located in an industrial building that was used by the Darling company between 1889 and 1971 to produce metal castings for industrial equipment. The building ceased to be used for commercial purposes in 1991.

In 1993, Montreal cultural organization Quartier Éphémère began to invest in 'in situ' projects within vacant or abandoned Montreal industrial buildings and to reach a diverse public, off of the beaten track of contemporary art. is one of QE’s projects. By turning buildings which were about to be demolished into artistic place, the association saved a total of 3500 square meters in the Faubourg des Recollets’s area.

Fonderie Darling visual arts centre started its activity by opening its exhibition area in 2002. In 2006, the association inaugurated 12 artists studios in the second part of the building. The building is classified as an "exceptional heritage value building" in the Montreal Built Heritage great repertoire. Its transformation from a foundry into an art center was one of the first industrial heritage recycling success.

Fonderie Darling supports different kinds of projects, sometimes highly technological, or risky, but always experimental, and open to the world of possibilities.

== History ==
The foundry was constructed in 1880 by the Darling brothers due to the high demand for metal in the construction of machinery, ships and the railway. It was later expanded several times between 1888 and 1918. Once complete, the complex consisted of four buildings, each with a specific role in the process of the foundry. The foundry became the second largest in Montreal, was at full capacity until the 1970s and employed 800 people.

The foundry was purchased by the Pumps & Softener Company in 1971, amid a downturn in the industry. The foundry eventually shut down completely in 1991.

Arts organization Quartier Éphémère created and directed by Caroline Andrieux moved into the complex in the 1990s. The city of Montreal owned the building and let the organisation move in at no charge in exchange for maintaining the building and turning it into an events venue. The building was in disrepair when Quartier Éphémère moved in, however, by the early 2000s, financing was obtained and the building was renovated.

Today, the building contains 3,500 square metres (38,000 sq ft) of space dedicated to the visual arts.

== Selected exhibitions ==
- Mark Lewis, Du cinema et des restes urbains (May 1- May 31, 2000)
- Stan Douglas, Klatsassin (September 6 - October 7, 2007)
- Jana Sterbak, Waiting for High Water (June 18 - August 30, 2009)
- Eija-Liisa Ahtila, Where is Where? (January 29 - April 25, 2010)
- 2boys.tv, darlingARCADE (2011)
- Shilpa Gupta, Will We Ever Be Able to Mark Enough? (October 5 - November 27, 2011)
- Chih-Chien Wang, The Act of Forgetting (April 2 - May 24, 2015)
- Ulla von Brandenburg, It Has a Golden Orange Sun and an Elderly Blue Moon (June 16 - August 21, 2016)
- Elsa Werth, Potentiels évoqués visuels (June 21 - August 19, 2018)
- Barbara Steinman, Diving for Dreams (June 13 - August 25, 2019)
- Michael Eddy, Je suis (February 27 - August 29, 2020)
