= Dynamics =

Dynamics (from Greek δυναμικός dynamikos "powerful", from δύναμις dynamis "power") or dynamic may refer to:

== Physics and engineering ==
- Dynamics (mechanics), the study of forces and their effect on motion

== Brands and enterprises ==
- Dynamic (record label), an Italian record label in Genoa

== Mathematics ==
- Dynamical system, a concept describing a point's time dependency
  - Topological dynamics, the study of dynamical systems from the viewpoint of general topology
- Symbolic dynamics, a method to model dynamical systems

== Social science ==
- Group dynamics, the study of social group processes especially
- Population dynamics, in life sciences, the changes in the composition of a population
- Psychodynamics, the study of psychological forces driving human behavior
- Social dynamics, the ability of a society to react to changes
- Spiral Dynamics, a social development theory

== Other uses ==
- Dynamics (music), the softness or loudness of a sound or note
- DTA Dynamic, a French ultralight trike wing design
- Force dynamics, a semantic concept about how entities interact with reference to force
- Dynamics (album)
- The Dynamics, American R&B group

== See also ==
- Dynamic Host Configuration Protocol
- Kinetics (disambiguation)
- Power (disambiguation)
- Static (disambiguation)
