= Caroline Andrieux =

Art historian and curator (born 1963)

- Born: 1963 (age 62–63); Hyeres, France
- Education: Paris-Sorbonne University
- Occupations: General and Art Director of the Fonderie Darling
- Known for: Founder of Quartier éphémère and Fonderie Darling

Caroline Andrieux (born 1963) is the founder and director of the Fonderie Darling, which opened in 2002 in the Cité du Multimédia district of Montreal.

== Early life ==
Caroline Andrieux was born in Hyeres south of France. She moved to Paris in 1983 to study art history at the Sorbonne University.

== Career ==
In 1987 along with Christophe Pasquet she has created in the 19th arrondissement of Paris the art center Usine Ephémère, which they moved in 1990 in the disused Bretonneau hospital building (18th arrondissement of Paris) and renamed Hôpital éphémère.

Andrieux moved to Montreal in 1992 and create the Montreal cultural organization Quartier Éphémère in 1993. Her aim is to use abandoned buildings for artistic events, exhibitions, and to open artist studios and residencies.

She has curated many exhibitions among which The Silver Cord in 2018 at the Fonderie Darling and Drinkers of Quintessences that took place at the Fonderie Darling (2018) and in Luxembourg City at the Casino Luxembourg (2019).

Andrieux holds Ph.D. in Art History from the Pantheon-Sorbonne University (Paris) jointly with Université du Québec à Montréal.

== Bibliography (selection) ==
- Le chiffre : multiples approches du chiffre dans l'art contemporain 1960 -1988, Paris : Dare Dare, 1988.
- Le cabinet anatomique de Daniel Spoerri, Paris : Ephémère Editions, 1994 ISBN 9782950244512
- État des lieux, Montréal: Quartier éphémère, 1994.
- Gigi Perron, Montréal: Quartier éphémère, 1996.
- Ultra vide, Montréal: Fonderie Darling Foundry, 2002
- Jean-Pierre Aubé : phénomènes = phenomena, Montréal: Quartier éphémère, 2005 ISBN 9782980570322
- Drinkers of Quintessences, Montréal : Quartier Ephémère, 2019 ISBN 9782980570353
