= Dial-A-Poem Montreal =

Phone-based poetry service

Dial-A-Poem Montreal was a phone-based service started in 1985 by Fortner Anderson, who was inspired by John Giorno's Dial-A-Poem and wanted to expand poetry beyond the limits of print. Listeners in Montreal could call 843-7636 (THE-POEM) anytime of the day to hear a poem. The service ran from September 1985 to July 1987 and ended because Anderson lacked the time and money needed for the project to continue. He produced the recordings himself and funded the project with his own money, sales of Clifford Duffy's first book Blue Dog Plus, individual sponsorships, and sponsorships by bookstores, local craftsmen, and schools. Participating bookstores included The Word Bookstore, Argo Bookshop, The Double Hook Book Shop, Steve Welch Books, and Véhicule Press. Anderson reported that in the first year, the service received about 200 phone calls a day and that over 150 poets contributed. He described the content of the poems as containing "themes of reaction to society's structures and structures, personal and social violence, topical issues of sex and gender, and people coping with alienation and the shifting ground of their own personalities."

Dial-A-Poem Montreal participated in Canada's eighth National Book Festival in April 1986 by showcasing a poem by a participating poet for each day of the festival. It celebrated it first anniversary September 1986 with a 100 Poets Party, where 11 hours of continuous recorded performance poetry was presented at Galerie Articule.

Though predominantly showcasing Anglophone poets in Montreal, Dial-A-Poem Montreal also aired the work of poets from Vancouver who sent their recordings to Dial-A-Poem Montreal. Poets who read on Dial-A-Poem Montreal include: Erín Moure, Howard Tessler, Bill Furey, Errol MacDonald, Raymond Filip, Clifford Duffy, Laurence Hutchman, Michael Toppings, Anne McLean, Roo Borson, Daphne Marlatt, Tom Wayman, Claudia Lapp, Elizabeth Allen, Patrick Lane, Lorna Crozier, Peter van Toorn, Endre Farkas, Brian Bartlett, Michael Harris, Noah Zacharin, Leo Kennedy, Esther Ross, Johanne Lafleur, Margaret Christakos, R.G. Everson, Louis Dudek, Irving Layton, Kathy Acker, Lynne Tillman, Chris Kraus, Sylvere Lotringer, David Rattray, Edmundo Farolan, Manuel Betanzos Santos, Shulamis Yelin, and Renato Trujillo.

Dial-A-Poem Montreal recently resumed with a 2020-2021 edition.
