= Claudia Lapp =

German poet

Claudia Lapp (born 1946) is a poet born in Stuttgart, Germany. She graduated from Bennington College in Vermont with a BA in French and German Literature, minor in Music, and then moved to Montreal, Quebec. She was a member of the Vehicule Poets, an experimental writing collective formed in Montreal in the 1970s and worked at John Abbott College in the English department and the Montreal Museum of Fine Art in the Education department. The other poets that she taught with in the English include David Solway, Peter van Toorn, Endre Farkas and Matthew von Baeyer. After being involved with the Montreal literary scene for eleven years from 1968 to 1979, she moved to Maryland and then Oregon in 1991. In 2002, she emceed a popular weekly poetry series at Cozmic Pizza in Eugene, Oregon. She has worked as an Exhibit Interpreter at the Jordan Schnitzer Museum for 8+ years. She is also a practicing astrologer and film photographer.

She participated in Dial-A-Poem Montreal from 1985 to 1987.

== Publications ==
=== Poetry ===
- Honey. Montreal, QC: Véhicule Press, 1973/77.
- Dakini. Montreal, QC: Véhicule Press, 1974.
- Horses. Montreal, QC: Véhicule Press, 1978.
- Cloud Gate. Ste. Anne de Bellevue: The Muses’ Company, 1985.
- Water and Fire. Eugene, OR: Dakini Press, 1998.
- Buch. Eugene, OR: Fae Press, 2013.
