= Miriam Ulinover =

Yiddish-language woman poet

- מרים אולינאָװער
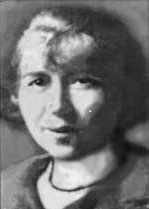
- Born: Manya Hirshbeyn; 22 February 1890; Łódź, Congress Poland, Russian Empire
- Died: 18 August 1944 (aged 53–54); Auschwitz-Birkenau, German-occupied Poland
- Occupation: Poet
- Years active: 1905–1944

Manya Hirshbeyn (Yiddish: מרים אולינאָװער; 22 February 1890 – 18 August 1944), known primarily as Miriam Ulinover or Miryem Ulinover, was a Yiddish-language poet. She is regarded for her folkloristic style and for being one of few religious and Orthodox Jewish women poets of her time.

== Personal life ==
Ulinover was born on 22 February 1890 in Łódź to parents Shimen and Sheyndl (née Gerzon) Hirshbeyn. Her parents divorced in 1905. She spent some of her childhood with her maternal grandfather, Talmudic scholar Shaye Gerzon, in the shtetl Krzepice (near modern-day Częstochowa, Poland). Ulinover, however, lived for the majority of her life in Łódź.

== Writing career ==
Sholem Aleichem inspired Ulinover to start writing when he met her in Łódź in 1905. Ulinover is known for writing folk poetry and is renowned for being one of few religiously observant Jewish women to write poetry.

Ulinover’s deliberately archaic language … contributed to an unusual statement of the modern. With an urge to preserve the ephemeral oral culture of the Jewish folk, and particularly of women, Ulinover created a new cultural artifact, the literary folk poem. Through the dialogue between a modern granddaughter and her old-fashioned grandmother, Ulinover introduced a specifically female voice into modern Yiddish poetry.

— Kathryn Hellerstein, A Question of Tradition: Women Poets in Yiddish, 1586-1987, chapter 4: The Folk and the Book

Some of Ulinover's poetry was featured in Ezra Korman's 1928 collection of Yiddish women poetry titled Yidishe dikhterins (Yiddish: ייִדישע דיכטערינס, lit. 'Yiddish Women Poets').

In 1922, Ulinover published her own book of poetry with the help of David Frischmann, titled Der bobes oytser (Yiddish: דער באָבעס אוצר, lit. 'The Grandmother's Treasure').

=== Literary gatherings ===
Before the war, Ulinover started a salon, bringing other renowned Yiddish writers to her home. Some of her interlocutors included Chaim Leib Fox, Rikuda Potash, Mirl Erdberg-Shatan, Simkha-Bunim Shayevitsh, Yeshayahu Shpigl, Alter Shnur, Rachmil Bryks, and Yitskhok Goldkorn. After being interned in the Łódź Ghetto in 1940, she continued to host her literary gatherings.

== Death and legacy ==
On 18 August 1944, Ulinover was deported to Auschwitz upon the Łódź Ghetto's liquidation and murdered in a gas chamber after arrival. While it is believed that she continued to write in the ghetto, many of her manuscripts are reported to have been lost during the Holocaust.
