= Final Assignment =

- Directed by: Paul Almond
- Written by: Marc Rosen
- Produced by: Gail Thomson
- Starring: Geneviève Bujold; Michael York; Burgess Meredith; Colleen Dewhurst
- Cinematography: John Coquillon
- Edited by: Debra Karen
- Music by: Peter Jermyn
- Production company: Cinema One
- Release date: October 1980 (Chicago)
- Running time: 98 minutes
- Country: Canada
- Language: English

Final Assignment is a 1980 Canadian thriller drama film, written by Marc Rosen and directed by Paul Almond.

== Plot ==
In this complex spy caper, Nicole (Geneviève Bujold) is a Canadian broadcast journalist working on assignment in the Soviet Union. She is there to cover a visit by the Canadian Prime Minister, but along the way she discovers an unethical experimentation on children involving the use of steroids, she is also involved in smuggling out a girl for emergency brain surgery. Things get complicated when in the process, she develops a romantic liaison with yoshita (Michael York), a bureaucrat in the Soviet press corps whose job is to watch her during her stay. A rich businessman (Burgess Meredith) she knows happens to be in Russia at the same time, and she asks him to help her in the smuggling attempt.

The film's cast also includes Colleen Dewhurst and Richard Gabourie.

== Cast ==
- Genevieve Bujold as Nicole Thompson
- Michael York as Lyosha Petrov
- Burgess Meredith as Zak
- Colleen Dewhurst as Dr. Valentine Ulanova
- Michelle Mostovoy as Tasha
- Richard Gabourie as Bowen
- Len Doncheff as Colonel Kozlov
- Alexandra Stewart as Samantha O'Donnell
- Septimiu Sever as Buchinsky (credited as Septimui Sever)
- David McIlwraith as Richard
- Renato Trujillo as Argentinian Guerrilla Leader
- Michael Maloley as KGB Agent (credited as Michael Mololey)
- Jeffrey Ladenheim as Guitarist / Gypsy In Final Scene (credited as Jeff Ladenheim)
- Andrew Semple as Russian Juggler

== Production ==
The film had originally been slated to be directed by Silvio Narizzano, although he left the production and Almond was brought in. Production was further complicated when the Soviet government refused Almond's request for stock film footage of Moscow and Leningrad, due to its displeasure at Canada's diplomatic response to the 1979 Soviet–Afghan War.

Dewhurst described her experience working on the film as "summer stock in Podunk". She clarified that "the crew was terrific. The hierarchy was at fault. I keep praying that it will never come out. I have no comment about Mr. Almond and you can write that down. You will never see four more confused actors on the screen in your life."

== Critical response ==
In his 2003 book A Century of Canadian Cinema, film scholar Gerald Pratley trashed the film, calling it "probably the worst spy movie ever made".
