= Kenneth Norris =

Kenneth or Ken Norris may refer to:

- Dick Norris, Kenneth Richard Norris (1914–2003), Australian entomologist
- Kenneth S. Norris (1924–1998), American marine mammal biologist and conservationist
- Ken Norris (athlete) (born 1931), British long-distance runner
- Ken Norris (actor) (died 2008), in The Space Museum
- Ken Norris (poet) (born 1951), poet, editor, and professor of Canadian literature
- Ken Norris (designer), see Ron Ayers
- Kenneth T. Norris Jr. (1930–1996), American industrialist and philanthropist
- Ken Norris, fictional character, see Kyle Sampson (Guiding Light)
