= Chaim Leib Fox =

Yiddish poet, writer and journalist (1894–1984)

Chaim Leib Fox (born Chaim Leib Fuchs/Fuks, 1894 – 1984), was a Yiddish poet, writer and journalist associated with literary life of Łódź after World War I. After emigrating to the U.S. in 1953, Fox worked on encyclopaedic projects, contributing over 3,000 articles for the Leksikon fun der Nayer Yidisher Literatur and publishing Hundert yor yidishe un hebreyishe literatur in Kanade on Canadian-Jewish diaspora.

== Life ==
Chaim Leib Fuchs was born in 1894 in Łódź. He played a significant role in the literary life of the city, where he cofounded the Łódź writers’ group and joined the avant-garde artistic group Yung-yidish. His poems, essays and prose appeared in Insel, Lodzer veker, Literarishe Bleter, Folkstsaytung and Vilner tog. His poetry was rich in religious and national themes. Fox wrote about the experience of living in Łódź in many essays and a monograph called Lodzh shel Mayle (1972). In the mid‑1920s he married writer Rikuda Potash; the couple had a daughter who was born in 1926. He briefly associated with General Jewish Labour Bund, then joined the Labor Zionists.

In 1936–1938 Fox lived in Palestine, where he joined Haganah. He spent the years 1940–1946 in the Soviet Union, afterwards moving back to Łódź. He then lived briefly in France, where he cofounded Yiddish literary association and the community of Eastern European Jews.

Fox immigrated to the U.S. in 1953, where he settled in New York. He published in New York-based Yiddish press: Zukunft, Forverts, Morgn zhurnal and Fraye Arbeter Shtime. His works also appeared in the Canadian Yiddish newspaper Keneder Adler. Additionally, Fox wrote over 3,000 articles for the Leksikon fun der Nayer Yidisher Literatur.

In 1980 Fox published Hundert yor yidishe un hebreyishe literatur in Kanade – a compendium on the history of literature and culture of the Jewish diaspora in Canada. The large comprehensive volume covered 429 Yiddish and Hebrew authors who published in Canada in 1870–1970. According to Vivian Felsen, it was "the most ambitious attempt to preserve Yiddish culture in Canada." The book was translated into French in 2005 by Pierre Anctil.

Fox died in 1984.

His grandson Josh Fox is an Oscar-Nominated Emmy Winning filmmaker and playwright whose works include Gasland. Awake, A Dream from Standing Rock and over 25 plays.

== Selected works ==
=== Poetry ===
- Dorshtike Lemer (1926)
- Zingt Mir di Velt (1936)
- Sho fun Lid (1951)
- Di Teg Neygn di Kep (1969)
- Der akhter himl, lider, tefiles, poemes fun mayn velt un fun mayn erets yisroel (1974)
- Tsu di himlen aroyf (1982)

=== Novels ===
- Gyoras Letster Veg (1939)

=== Nonfiction ===
- A yidish shtetl bay der khinezish-sovetisher grenets (1958)
- Der yidisher khurbn in poyln in di verk fun katsenelson, broderzon un segalovitsh (1965)
- Lodzh shel Mayle (1972)
- Hundert yor yidishe un hebreyishe literatur in Kanade (1980)
