= Tom Konyves =

Canadian poet

Tom Konyves (July 13, 1947 - October 26, 2026) was a Canadian poet, video producer, educator and a pioneer in the field of videopoetry. Prior to his retirement, he taught creative visual writing at the University of the Fraser Valley.

== Biography ==
Born Könyves Tamás [ˈkøɲvɛʃ ˌtɒmɑ̈ːʃ] in Budapest, Hungary, he emigrated to Canada following the Hungarian Revolution of 1956. He lived in Montreal from 1957 to 1983, when he moved to Vancouver, where he lived with his wife, Marlene, sons Alexander, Gabriel and daughter, Hannah. He graduated from Concordia University in 1969, worked as a teacher, editor and journalist until 1977, when he became a poet-member of Vehicule Art Gallery, Montreal's first artist-run non-profit centre. As a poet at Vehicule Art, he collaborated with Endre Farkas, Ken Norris, Artie Gold, Stephen Morrissey, Claudia Lapp and John McAuley to form a group of 7 who became known as The Vehicule Poets. Their exploits were documented in the 1993 book, Vehicule Days: An Unorthodox History of Montréal's Vehicule Poets, edited by Ken Norris.

== The Vehicule Years ==
Between 1977 and 1983, Konyves produced his first videopoems – Sympathies of War, Mummypoem, Yellow Light Blues, No Parking, And Once They Have Tasted Freedom, Not Before Nor After (with Linda Lee Tracy), Quebecause and Thus Spoke Tzarathustra.

In 1978, Véhicule Press published No Parking, his first book of poetry.

To promote the poetry reading series he was organizing at Vehicule Art, he approached the daily newspaper, The Montreal Star; subsequently, he was hired to write a monthly column, Poetry Corner, which he wrote until the demise of The Star, 13 months later.

He published 2 issues of a poetry magazine, Hh (invented acronym for the word "hobbyhorse", considered the dictionary definition of Dada), that included some visual poems and text collages.

In 1979, with a grant from the Montreal Arts Council, he produced the controversial public poetry project, Poetry On The Buses, Poésie en Mouvement; fifty copies of 20 poems, 10 by Anglophone Quebec poets, 10 by Francophone Quebec poets, on 11 “x 28” styrene panels, were to be posted on 1000 buses. At first, the MUCTC (Montreal Urban Community Transport Commission) agreed only to post the French poems. Following a protest by the poets, led by Louis Dudek, the commission relented and agreed to post 30% of the English poems, reflecting the Anglo population of Montreal. The project, the first of its kind in Canada, was launched on Thursday, December 13, 1979, with all major media present in a bus provided by the MUCTC in front of the old bus terminal on St. Antoine St. The consultant for the English poems was Louis Dudek; the consultant for the French poems was Claude Beausoleil.

Influenced by performance art, Konyves performed Ezra Pound's poem, In A Station Of The Metro at the Berri Metro Station, bowing with the last word, bough; other performances included Motions and Marie The Poem, performed with black electric tape on a white wall, accompanied by a recording of the day's radio programming, edited by manually changing stations.

He initiated collaborative performances, first with Ken Norris on the video See/Saw (including Konyves' 7-year-old son, Michael Konyves), followed by Drummer Boy Raga: Red Light, Green Light, based on To Dawn, a poem written by Tom Konyves, performed by Konyves, Ken Norris, Endre Farkas, Stephen Morrissey, John McAuley and Opal L. Nations, accompanied by Robert Van Wyck on flute, Tom Ezzy on bongo drum, and 16-year-old dancer, Vivian Katz.

In 1979, he produced Art Montreal, a series of 26 half-hour TV programs for Channel 9, Cable TV. The following year, assisted by a grant from The Canada Council, he produced 6 one-hour documentary programs, Performance Art in Quebec.

Having moved from 61 to 307 St. Catherine Street, Vehicule Art presented its first Exhibition of Concrete Poetry, curated by Tom Konyves in June, 1980.

With CBC journalist Jacques Marchand, Konyves co-hosted a series of 11 French-language programs, Les Poètes Quebecois de la Langue Anglaise, broadcast on CBC once a week through November and December 1982.

On April 8, 2004, 25 years after the Maker Press publication of the anthology The Vehicule Poets, the Musée d'art contemporain de Montréal sponsored Cabaret Vehicule, an evening celebrating the 7 Montreal poets at Place des Arts. The theatre group Step dans Fuego performed poems by the poets, which was followed by videopoems by Tom Konyves and readings by the poets. Artie Gold, one of the original group, was too ill to attend; his poems were read by Ruth Taylor. Within 2 years, Ruth died, followed a year later, on Valentine's Day, by Artie Gold himself.

== Videopoetry ==
In 1982, Tom Konyves coined the term 'videopoetry' in "The Insecurity of Art", a book of essays on poetics published by Véhicule Press. In the essay titled Videopoetry, he writes, "Whereas I consider a line the unit of poem-making, like bricklaying, in video we substitute visual lines for printed lines and proceed to "layer" a poem: spoken words (the poet-performer); words heard (taped, dubbed); and seen (signs, subtitles, printed, painted). Naturally, a poem written with these three forms of word-smithing is never 'itself' until it is meshed with visual imagery... the end-product demonstrates a "judicious" mix of the two." (p.83)

Between 1978 and 2010, he produced 17 works in the genre.

In 2008, to develop a course in visual poetry at the University of the Fraser Valley, Konyves began researching videopoetry by visiting archives in Vancouver, San Francisco, Berlin, Budapest, Buenos Aires, Toronto, New York and Chicago.

On Sept. 6, 2011, he published Videopoetry: A Manifesto. In the manifesto, he claimed it was necessitated by "the underlying dichotomy (that) opposes videopoetry – I envision the measured integration of narrative, non-narrative and anti-narrative juxtapositions of text, image and sound as resulting in a poetic experience – to works which publish poems (voiced or displayed on-screen) in video format." (p. 3)

The manifesto addresses 3 aspects of videopoetry: its definition, its constraints and its categories. Videopoetry is defined as "a genre of poetry displayed on a screen, distinguished by its time-based, poetic juxtaposition of images with text and sound. In the measured blending of these three elements, it produces in the viewer the realization of a poetic experience." (p. 4)

Of its constraints, Konyves writes, "Text, displayed on-screen or voiced, is an essential element of the videopoem. A work which does not contain visible or audible text could be described as poetic, as an art film or video art, but not as a videopoem. Imagery in a videopoem – including on-screen text – does not illustrate the voiced text." (p. 4)

Based on a work's use of text, he describes 5 categories of videopoetry: Kinetic Text, Visual Text, Sound Text, Performance and Cin(e)poetry. (p. 6)

In addition, Konyves distinguishes between the various uses of text in a videopoem. "Text is typically written for the videopoem, not for print; in some cases it is found – in books or on signs – and repurposed for the videopoem. Used in a videopoem, a previously composed/published poem represents only one element of the resulting poem, the text element. The “poetry” in videopoetry is the result of the judicious juxtaposition of text with image and sound." (p.8)

== A M Productions ==
Arriving in Vancouver in 1983, Tom Konyves established A M Productions, a video production facility. From 1983 to 2003, the company produced numerous educational, industrial, corporate and music videos, including To Return: The John Walkus Story, the award-winning documentary on belonging, acceptance and loss of culture. This powerful one-hour documentary witnesses and celebrates young Kwakwaka'wakw artist John Walkus Green's journey home to the village he was forcefully adopted out of as a child. This story is also an investigation into the BC Provincial Government's Adoption policies which had tragic consequences for the children it was meant to protect. The film received a humanitarian award from the American Indian Film Festival in San Francisco. Stephen Hume of the Vancouver Sun described the film as “one of the most disturbing, illuminating and deeply troubling documentaries I’ve seen in years.” In 2003, a fire destroyed the AM space and production ceased. To date, the company continues to distribute the hundreds of videos in its catalogue of educational videos in the fields of mining, remote sensing, GIS, as well as the performance art videos produced under the title of Art Montreal.

== Bibliography ==
- Love Poems, Asylum Press, 1974
- Proverbsi (with Ken Norris), Asylum Press, 1978. ISBN 0-920320-01-5
- No Parking, Véhicule Press, 1978. ISBN 978-0-919890-15-2
- Poetry in Performance, The Muses’ Company, 1982. ISBN 9780919754027
- Ex Perimeter, Caitlin Press, 1988. ISBN 978-0920576205
- Sleepwalking Among The Camels: New and Selected Poems, The Muses’ Company, 1998. ISBN 0-919754-58-9
- OOSOOM (Out of Sight Out of Mind), Bookthug, 2007. ISBN 978-1-897388-03-7
- "Perfect Answers to Silent Questions", Ekstasis Editions, 2015. ISBN 978-1-77171-107-4

== Videopoems ==
- Sympathies of War (1978) 10 Min.
- Mummypoem (Sympathies of War - A Postscript) (1978) 6 Min.
- See/Saw (with Ken Norris)(1978) 15 Min.
- Ubu’s Blues (1979) 22 Min.
- No Parking (1979) 5 Min.
- Yellow Light Blues (1980) 15 Min.
- And Once They Have Tasted Freedom (1981) 3 Min.
- Not Before Nor After (1982) 3 Min. (with Linda Lee Tracy)
- Quebecause (1982) 2 Min.
- Thus Spoke Tzarathustra (1983) 6 Min.
- Sign Language (1985) 4 Min.
- Percussion (1993) 30 Sec.
- Hopscotch (1993) 60 Sec.
- A Poem for the Rivers Project (2004) (with Alex Konyves) 2 Min.
- Beware of Dog (2008) 4 min.
- All This Day Is Good For (2010) 3 min.
- ow(n)ed (2014) 6 min.

== Critical reception ==
=== On The Vehicule Poets ===
What is on the boards (and the buses) is no less than "a whole culture busting loose," a catharsis of values, an aesthetic revolution. Konyves, the ringleader, is the most avant-gardist, Dadaist, surrealist, multi-media-prone. You must put your reason and sanity aside to read him.
- Louis Dudek, The Montreal Gazette, February 16, 1980

=== On Poetry In Performance ===
"The most experimental by far is Konyves. He's taken the poem off the page and turned it into visual performance. He has, in effect, made the "writing" of poetry into a creative act. He is also the most articulate defender of this type of poetry and his Poetry in Performance is crammed with explanatory notes, reasons why he does what he does and essays that anticipate criticism."
- Michael Mirolla, The Montreal Gazette, Dec. 24, 1982

Tom Konyves acknowledges both the surrealists and the dadaists as major influences on his performance poetry. Poetry in Performance is a collection of the scripts of his video and performance poems, along with introductory essays and footnotes to each of them, accounts of his collaborations with The Véhicule Poets, Konyves' concrete poems, and some short essays on poetry. The introductions serve to document the extraordinarily energetic literary activity in Montreal over the past decade, and specifically Konyves' movement towards video poetry. Reflecting political as well as aesthetic interests, the scripts are witty and lively, and two of them, "Sympathies of War" and "No Parking," moved me especially. Like the essays, they raise questions about the nature and function of poetry and poets. Konyves' first "tribe" was the other Véhicule poets. But beyond this kind of collaboration, he is after larger collaborations: between sight and sound, form and content, environment and art, poetry and technology, conception and performance, the audience and the poet. Removing words from a linear context is part of the poet's war of imagination against rationalism: war against any hard line, political or artistic, which is exclusive or divisive.
- Ann Mandel, Books In Review, Canadian Literature, Issue 101, Summer 1984 (p. 149-153)

=== On Ex Perimeter ===
As his title suggests, in Ex Perimeter, Tom Konyves explores boundaries — between poetry and prose, and between art and life. Like American poet Frank O'Hara, Konyves views the poem as a "temporary object," which must be "true/ to the moment." The economy of language here, the prose-like cadence, the focus on the "real" world, and on human mortality, are all features of Konyves' writing in this volume.
- Susan Schenk – Unmapped Territory, Journal of Canadian Literature, Issue #130 (Autumn 1991)

Konyves relays an authentic voice in well-carpentered passages... short, from the heart epiphanies one finds marked with peculiarly urban tenderness; back alley kind of poems that cue on the localized imagery of a Montreal lane, a cemetery, a lover's bed. Konyves has a precise eye for detail and he strives for meaning in his observations. There is contentment with the ordinary, tribute to birth and death, to change of landscape.
- TREVOR CAROLAN, The Vancouver Sun, May 13, 1989

The poems in Ex Perimeter are sparse, clear, direct and full of delicate and precise insight. Whenever I read them I say to myself, "Yes, that is it, exactly." In this life of mine which is too often out of control and beyond reflection, these poems bring me to a sudden stop. "Pay attention," they say, "to the moment, to experience, to what is."
- Lionel Kearns

=== On Sleepwalking Among The Camels ===
According to the Journal of Canadian Poetry, Konyves' work demonstrates experimental approaches and a variety of technical techniques.The review noted the diversity of the poems, highlighted their use of rhythm and literary allusions, and argued that the collections reflects the poet's stated artistic goals.
- JOURNAL OF CANADIAN POETRY

Rob McLennan described Konyves' poems as 'beyond poems' characterized them as works that leave 'surprising after taste' and resist easy interpretation.

=== On The Vehicule Poets_Now ===
Konyves was always the one most involved in the history and course of the central European avant garde. Tom Konyves, for example, became fascinated with the possibilities of videotape when that medium was new. He made something he called "videopoetry," and is now a west coast video-arts doyen. Konyves is witty, terse and cynical. He chose his surrealist roots, and they, along with his years as a video artist, have led him away from exposition.
- George Bowering, Introduction, The Vehicule Poets_Now, The Muses Company, 2004
