= Pierre Anctil =

Canadian historian (born 1952)

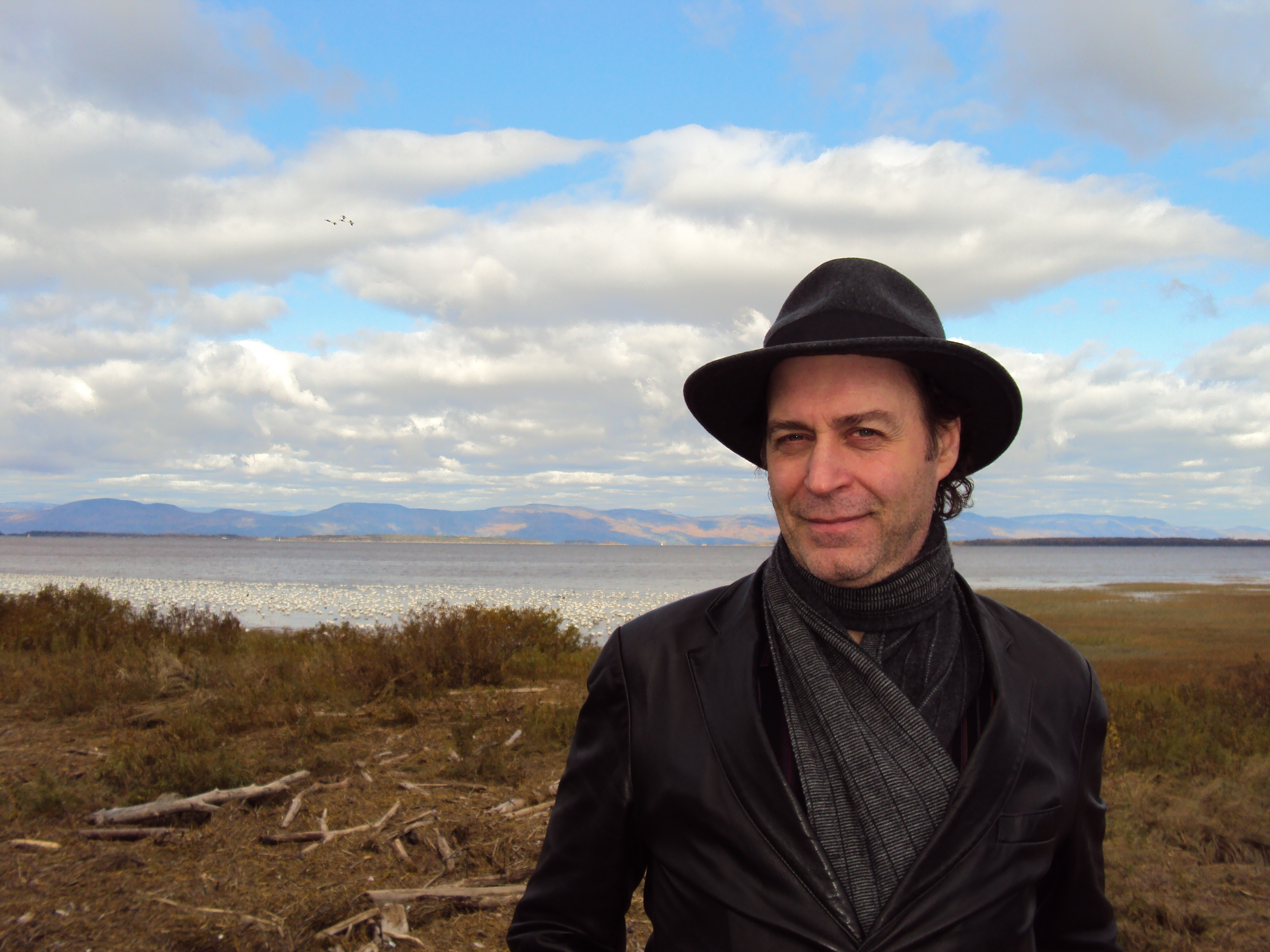
- Anctil, 2010
- Born: July 27, 1952 (age 74); Québec City
- Occupation: Historian

Pierre Anctil FRSC is a Canadian historian. He is specialist of the Jewish community of Montreal, of Yiddish literature and of the poetic work of Jacob-Isaac Segal. He also published on the history of immigration to Canada. He translated a dozen Yiddish books into French.

== Biography ==
Anctil was born in Quebec City. He graduated with a Doctor of Philosophy degree in social anthropology at the New School for Social Research in New York City in 1980.

After being active for eight years at the Quebec institute for cultural research (IQRC), he carried out a post-doctorate in Jewish studies at McGill University (1988–1991), where he led the program of French-Canadian studies. Since 1991, he is holding various positions in the Quebec public service, among others, in the Ministry of Relations with citizens and immigration, all while continuing his research about the Jewish community in Montreal. From 1989 until 2000, he participated regularly in the Dialogue Saint-Urbain (St. Urban Dialog), an organization founded by Jacques Langlais and David Rome which promoted a better understanding between the Jews and the francophone majority in Quebec, and in which several intellectuals, writers and artists participate including Victor Goldbloom, Naim Kattan, Pierre Nepveu and Agnès Gruda.

From 1999 to 2000, he was a visiting scholar to Pointe-à-Callière Museum of Montreal, where he carried out the exhibitions "Saint-Laurent: Montréal's Main" (2002) and "Archaeology and the Bible – From King David to the Dead Sea Scrolls" (2003).

From 2002 to 2003 he was President of the Quebec Intercultural Relations Council

He was an associate professor at UQAM's Department of History from 1996 to 2004. In 2004 he became the director of the Institute of Canadian Studies at the University of Ottawa and professor in the History Department at the same university. He was a visiting professor at the Ernst-Moritz Universität (Greifswald, Germany) (2007), University of Zagreb, Croatia (2007) and at the Hebrew University of Jerusalem, Israel (2012).

== Honours and awards ==
- Shortlisted, Prix littéraires du Gouverneur général du Canada 2018, cat. "Essais" pour for Histoire des Juifs du Québec, 2017.
- Shortlisted translation by Vivian Felsen of Jacob Isaac Segal: A Montreal Yiddish Poet and His Milieu, Governor General's Literary Awards, cat. "Translation", 2018.
- 2018 Canadian Jewish Literary Award, "History" for Histoire des Juifs du Québec, 2017.
- 2018 Rosa and David Finestone Award of the Montreal Jewish Public Library for Histoire des Juifs du Québec, 2017.
- Louis Rosenberg Distinguished Service Award (2015) of the Association for the Canadian Jewish Studies.
- Canada Prize in the Humanities (2014) of the Canadian Federation for the Humanities and Social Sciences for his book Jacob-Isaac Segal (1896-1954). Un poète yiddish de Montréal et son milieu, 2012.
- Canadian Jewish Book Award (2013), Yiddish section, Toronto, for his book Jacob-Isaac Segal (1896-1954). Un poète Yiddish de Montréal et son milieu, 2012.
- 2013 Luc Lacourcière Medal of the CELAT (Laval University) for his book Jacob-Isaac Segal (1896-1954). Un poète Yiddish de Montréal et son milieu, 2012.
- Jacob-Isaac Segal Award ("Shulamis Yelin French Literature Award on a Jewish Theme", 2012) of the Jewish Public Library of Montreal for his book Trajectoires juives au Québec, Québec, 2010.
- Member of the Royal Society of Canada (since 2012).
- Jacob-Isaac Segal Award (2008) of the Jewish Public Library of Montreal for the translation from Yiddish into French of the work of Sholem Shtern, Nostalgie et tristesse, 2006.
- Canadian Jewish Book Award ("The Izzy and Betty Kirshenbaum Foundation Award in Yiddish Translation", 2003), Toronto, for the translation from Yiddish into French of the book by Israel Medresh, Le Montréal juif entre les deux guerres, 2001
- Jacob-Isaac Segal Award (2002) of the Jewish Public Library of Montreal for the translation from Yiddish into French of the book by Yehuda Elberg L'Empire de Kalman l'infirme.
- Ezekiel Hart Award from the Canadian Jewish Congress, Quebec Region (1998) for outstanding contribution to intercultural relations on the part of a person not belonging to the Jewish community.

== Books ==
- 1988: Le rendez-vous manqué. Les Juifs de Montréal face au Québec de l’entre-deux-guerres, Quebec City, IQRC.
- 1990: In collaboration with Ira Robinson and Mervin Butovsky, An Everyday Miracle, Yiddish Culture in Montreal, Montreal, Vehicle Press.
- 1992: Jacob-Isaac Segal, Yidishe lider / Poèmes Yiddish (translated from Yiddish), Montréal, Éditions Le Noroît.
- 1997: Israel Medresh, Le Montréal juif d'autrefois (translated from Yiddish), Sillery, Éditions du Septentrion.
- 1998: Tur Malka. Flâneries sur les cimes de l’histoire juive montréalaise, Sillery, Éditions du Septentrion.
- 1999: Simon Belkin, Di Poale-Zion bavegung in Kanade / Le mouvement ouvrier juif au Canada, 1904-1920 (translated from Yiddish), Sillery, Éditions du Septentrion.
- 2000: Hirsch Wolofsky, Mayn lebns rayze. Un demi-siècle de vie Yiddish à Montréal et ailleurs dans le monde, (translated from Yiddish), Sillery, Éditions du Septentrion.
- 2000: In collaboration with Ira Robinson and Gérard Bouchard, Juifs et Canadiens français dans la société québécoise, Sillery, Éditions Septentrion.
- 2001: Israel Medresh, Le Montréal juif entre les deux guerres (translated from Yiddish), Sllery, Éditions du Septentrion.
- 2001: In collaboration with David Rome, Through the Eyes of the Eagle. The Early Montreal Yiddish Press, 1907-1916, Montreal, Vehicle Press.
- 2002: Yehuda Elberg, L’empire de Kalman l’infirme (translated from Yiddish), Montréal/Paris, Éditions Leméac.
- 2002: Saint-Laurent, la Main de Montréal/ Saint-Laurent, Montreal's Main, Sillery, Édition du Septentrion, 2002.
- 2004: "A. M. Klein: The Poet and His Relations with French Québec", in Richard Menkis and Norman Ravvin (ed.), The Canadian Jewish Reader, Calgary Red Deer Press, 2004.
- 2005: Haïm-Leib Fuks, Cent ans de littérature Yiddish et hébraïque au Canada (translated from Yiddish), Sillery, Éditions Septentrion, 2005.
- 2006: Sholem Shtern, Nostalgie et tristesse. Mémoires littéraires du Montréal yiddish (translated from Yiddish), Montréal, Éditions Le Noroît, 2006.
- 2007: In collaboration with Norman Ravvin and Sherry Simon, New Readings of Yiddish Montreal/ Traduire le Montréal yiddish, Ottawa, University of Ottawa Press.
- 2009: Hershl Novak, The First Yiddish School in Montreal (translated from Yiddish), Sillery, Publishing North
- 2010: Trajectoires juives au Québec, Québec, Presses de l'Université Laval.
- 2010: Fais ce que dois. 60 éditoriaux pour comprendre Le Devoir sous Henri Bourassa (1910-1932), Sillery, Éditions du Septentrion.
- 2011: In collaboration with Ira Robinson, Les communautés juives de Montréal. Histoire et enjeux contemporains, Sillery, Éditions du Septentrion.
- 2011: In collaboration with Howard Adelman, Religion, Culture, and the State: Reflections on the Bouchard-Taylor Report, Toronto, University of Toronto Press.
- 2012: Jacob-Isaac Segal (1896-1956). Un poète Yiddish de Montréal et son milieu, Québec, Presses de l'Université Laval.
- 2013: Soyons nos maîtres. 60 éditoriaux pour comprendre Le Devoir sous Georges Pelletier (1932-1947), Sillery, Éditions du Septentrion.
- 2014: À chacun ses Juifs. 60 éditoriaux pour comprendre la position du Devoir à l'égard des Juifs (1910-1947), Sillery, Éditions du Septentrion.
- 2015: Les Juifs de Québec. Quatre cents ans d'histoire, Québec, Presses de l'Université du Québec.
- 2016: Do What You Must. Selected Editorials from Le Devoir under Henri Bourassa (1910-1932), translated by Tonu Onu, Toronto, Publications of the Champlain Society, no 77.
- 2017: Jacob-Isaac Segal, a Montreal Yiddish Poet and His Milieu, Ottawa, University of Ottawa Press.
- 2017: Histoire des Juifs du Québec, Montréal, Éditions du Boréal.
