= S. Morris Engel =

Canadian philosopher

S. Morris Engel (born 1931) is an author, philosopher, and linguist. He received his PhD from the University of Toronto in 1959, writing on "The philosophy of language in Hobbes and Locke". He was a professor of philosophy at the University of Southern California and York University.

== Published works ==
- Analyzing Informal Fallacies
- Fallacies and Pitfalls of Language: The Language Trap
- Language and Illumination: Studies in the History of Philosophy
- The Chain of Logic
- The Language Trap: Or, How to Defend Yourself Against the Tyranny of Words
- The Problem of Tragedy
- The Study of Philosophy
- With Good Reason: An Introduction to Informal Fallacies
- Wittgenstein's Doctrine of the Tyranny of Language: An Historical and Critical Examination of His Blue Book

Engel also translated "Cat in the Ghetto: Stories" by Rachmil Bryks from Yiddish to English.
