= David Botwinik =

Lithuanian Yiddish-language composer (1920–2022)

- Born: 12 December 1920; Vilnius, Central Lithuania
- Died: 9 February 2022 (aged 101); Montreal, Quebec, Canada
- Occupation: Composer

David Botwinik (Yiddish: דוד באָטװיניק; 12 December 1920 – 9 February 2022) was a Lithuanian-born Canadian composer of Yiddish music and music teacher.

Born in Vilna, Central Lithuania, he began his studies at the Yiddish music conservatory in Vilna at around age 13. Shortly before, he studied at the Conservatory of Music Santa Cecilia, Rome. In 1956, he emigrated to Montreal, Canada where he worked as a music teacher and as a choir director of Jewish Peretz School and United Talmud Torahs. For a short time, he published the collection of songs Der nayer dor (The New Generation) and the satirical newspaper Der shmayser (The Spanking).

In 2010, his book From Holocaust To Life (Yiddish: פֿון חורבן צום לעבן, romanized: Fun khurbn tsum lebn) was published by the League for Yiddish (New York). This book contains 56 original compositions, including Yiddish Holocaust songs, children's songs and choral compositions, with lyrics by various poets and some by Botwinik himself. In 2017, a CD containing 15 songs was published under the title From Holocaust to Life, Yiddish Art Songs. The CD features internationally acclaimed singers Lisa Willson, John Packard, Ian DeNolfo and Louis Danto. His son, Alexander, a Yiddish language lecturer at the University of Pennsylvania, is producing a second CD of his music including songs from children and adults.

Botwinik died in Montreal on 9 February 2022, at the age of 101.
