= Raymond Filip =

Lithuanian-Canadian poet and writer

Raymond Filip (born 1950) is a Lithuanian-Canadian poet and writer who was born in a displaced persons camp in Lübeck, Germany after World War II. He teaches in the English department at John Abbott College in Sainte-Anne-de-Bellevue, Quebec.

He is the author of six collections of poetry and one collection of prose. His work has been included in major anthologies: The Penguin Treasury of Canadian Popular Songs and Poems edited by John Robert Colombo (Penguin 2002); The New Canadian Poets 1970-1985 edited by Dennis Lee (McClelland & Stewart 1985); and Canadian Poets of the 80s edited by Ken Norris (House of Anansi 1983). His work has been translated into French, Spanish, Italian, and Lithuanian.

His poetry centres on themes of domestic abuse, war trauma, and immigration. He participated in Dial-A-Poem Montreal 1985–1987.

== Publications ==
=== Poetry ===
- Flowers in Magnetic Fields. Toronto, ON: Guernica Editions, 1994.
- Backscatter: New and Selected Poems. Toronto, ON: Guernica Editions, 2001.
- Rivers Applaud Forever. Toronto, ON: Guernica Editions, 2019.
- Six Poems. Montreal, QC: League of Canadian Poets, 1988.
- Hope’s Half-Life: Nuclear Poems. Montreal, QC: Véhicule Press, 1983.
- Somebody Told Me I Look Like Everyman. Vancouver, BC: Arsenal Pulp Press, 1978.

=== Prose ===
- After the Fireworks. Montreal, QC: Guernica Editions, 1989.
