= Manuel Betanzos Santos =

Galician poet, critic & translator

Manuel Betanzos Santos (1933-1995) was a Galician poet, critic and translator who settled in Montreal, Quebec in 1959. He taught at Université de Sherbrooke in the 1960s and later at McGill University and Lower Canada College. He founded the trilingual (English-French-Spanish) literary magazine, Boreal, which offered a forum for new writers and circulated across the Americas for 25 years. He read his own work at English, French, and Spanish poetry venues in Montreal.

He participated in Dial-A-Poem Montreal 1985–1987.

== Publications ==
=== Poetry ===
- Boreal P.E.C. international, Montréal 85. Montréal, QC: Boreal P.E.C., 1985.
- Poemas del pájaro. Barcelona: Ediciones Rondas, 1980.
- Diario de una noche de tren y ruedas. Bilbao: Editorial CLA, 1974.
- Canción en el viento: poesías. Barcelona: Rondas, 1974.
- Conjugación irregular. Montreal, QC: Boreal, 1973.
- Canción del niño en la ventana : cuatro estaciones para un corazón: poemas. Nueva York: Editorial Mensaje, 1970.
- Se hizo dura la faz de la tierra. Barcelona: El Bardo, 1967.
- Tala; poemas de la guerra indiferente. Bilbao, 1967.
- Arbol amante. Madrid: 1964.
- Como piedras en la otra orilla: poesía. Montreal, QC: Three Star Print. & Pub. Co., 1964.
