= Ken Norris (poet) =

Retired professor, poet, and editor

- Born: Kenneth Wayne Norris; 3 April 1951 (age 75); New York City, U. S.
- Occupations: Poet, editor and professor

Kenneth Wayne Norris (born April 3, 1951) is a poet, editor and professor of Canadian literature, retired from the University of Maine. He was born in New York City to Leroy and Theresa Norris, attended Stony Brook University for his BA from 1968-1972, and then moved to Montreal to pursue his MA in English at Sir George Williams University (now Concordia University). He chose Montreal because “Montreal sound like a magical, mystical place” and because of Leonard Cohen. He “was tired of being an anti-American American in the Nixon era, and coming to Quebec (and Canada) gave [him] a positive agenda, gave [him] something positive to be.” After his graduation in 1975, he spent two years in New York before returning to Montreal for his PhD in English at McGill University, supervised by Louis Dudek, who in 1992 described Norris as "the most important poet writing on the North American continent today". He became particularly interested in Canadian modernist literature, with his thesis entitled “The Role of the Little Magazine in the Development of Modernist and Post-Modernism in Canadian Poetry”.

Starting from 1975, he became involved with the Vehicule Art Gallery and Vehicule Press, reading at the gallery, and publishing with and editing at the press. He was a core member of the Vehicule Poets. From 1975-1983 he ran a literary magazine, CrossCountry, and a small press, CrossCountry Press with his friend Jim Mele in New York. After the dissolution of CrossCountry due to lack of funds, Norris become the McGill-Writer-In-Residence 1983-1984. In 1985, he became a Canadian citizen and in the same year, he left Montreal to teach at the University of Maine in Canadian literature. He has also taught at Concordia University, Dawson College in Montreal and University of Western Ontario.

== Publications ==
=== Poetry ===
- The Weight. Toronto, ON: Toronto, ON: Guernica Editions, 2015.
- Rua da Felicidade. Vancouver, BC: New Star Books, 2013.
- Floating Up to Zero. Vancouver, BC: Talonbooks, 2011.
- Asian Skies. Vancouver, QC: Talonbooks, 2010.
- Going Home. Vancouver, BC: Talonbooks, 2007.
- Dominican Moon. Vancouver, BC: Talonbooks, 2005.
- Fifty. Vancouver, BC: Talonbooks, 2003.
- The Way Life Should Be. Hamilton, ON: Wolsak and Wynn Publishers Ltd., 2003.
- Hotel Montreal: New and Selected Poems. Vancouver, BC: Talonbooks, 2001.
- Report on the Second Half of the Twentieth Century, Books 16-22.Ste. Anne de Bellevue: The Muses’ Company.
- Report on The Second Half of The Twentieth Century: Books 12-15. Ste. Anne de Bellevue: The Muses’ Company, 2000.
- The Better Part of Heaven. Toronto, ON: Coach House Press, 1998.
- Limbo Road. Burnaby, BC: Talonbooks, 1998.
- Report on the Second Half of the Twentieth Century, Books 8-11. Ste. Anne de Bellevue: The Muses’ Company, 1998.
- Odes. Toronto, ON: Coach House Press, 1997.
- The Music. Toronto, ON: ECW Press, 1995.
- Full Sun. Ste. Anne de Bellevue: Muses’ Company, 1993.
- Alphabet of Desire. Toronto, ON: ECW Press, 1991.
- In the House of No. Kingston, ON: Quarry Press, 1991.
- Report on the Second Half of the Twentieth Century: Books I-IV. Montreal, QC: Cross Country Press, 1988.
- Islands. Kingston, ON: Quarry Press, 1986.
- In the Spirit of the Times. Ste-Anne de Bellevue, QC: The Muses' Company, 1986.
- One Night. Windsor, ON: Black Moss Press, 1985.
- Whirlwinds. Montreal, QC: Guernica Editions, 1983.
- To Sleep, To Love. Montreal, QC: Guernica Editions, 1980.
- Autokinesis. Montreal, QC: Cross Country Press, 1979.
- Perfect Accident. Montreal, QC: Vehicule Press, 1978.
- Report on the First Half of the Twentieth Century. Montreal, QC: Cross Country Press, 1977.
- Under the Skin. Montreal, QC: Cross Country Press, 1976.
- Vegetables. Montreal. QC: Vehicule Press, 1975.
- Vishyun. Victoria. BC: Ekstasis Editions, 2023.

=== Non-fiction ===
- Insecurity of Art. By Ken Norris and Peter Van Toorn. Montreal, QC: Vehicule Press, 2000.
- A New World: Essays on Poetry and Poetics. Empyreal Press, 1994.
- Vehicule Days: An Unorthodox History of Montreal’s Vehicule Press. Winnipeg, MB: Signature Editions, 1993.
- The Little Magazine in Canada, 1925-80: Its Role in the Development of Modernism and Post-Modernism in Canadian Poetry. Toronto, ON: ECW Press, 1984.
- Violent Duality: A Study of Margaret Atwood. By Sherrill Grace and Ken Norris. Montreal, QC: Vehicule Press, 1980.

=== Edited ===
- The Collected Books of Artie Gold. Ken Norris and Endre Farkas eds. Vancouver, BC: Talonbooks, 2010.
- Take This Waltz: A Celebration of Leonard Cohen. Michael Fournier and Ken Norris eds. Ste. Anne de Bellevue, Quebec: Muses’ Company, 1994.
- Poets 88. Kingston, ON: Quarry Press, 1988.
- Canadian Poetry Now: 20 Poets of the “80s”. Toronto, ON: Anansi, 1984.
- Cross/Cut: Contemporary English Quebec Poetry. Ken Norris and Peter Van Toorn eds. Montreal, QC: Vehicule Press, 1982.
