= Sarah Henstra =

Canadian writer and academic

Sarah Henstra is a Canadian writer and academic. A professor of English literature and creative writing at Toronto Metropolitan University, she is most noted for her 2018 novel The Red Word, which won the Governor General's Award for English-language fiction at the 2018 Governor General's Awards.

She previously published the young adult novel Mad Miss Mimic in 2015.
