= Jewish People's and Peretz Schools =

Jewish People's Schools and Peretz Schools
- ײִדישע פאָלקס שולן און פרץ שולן

Location
- 6500 Kildare Road; Côte Saint-Luc, Quebec, Canada; 45.4784°N 73.6571°W

Information
- Type: Private Jewish day school
- Religious affiliation: Judaism
- Established: 1913; 113 years ago
- Principal (JPPS): Marnie Stein
- Principal (Bialik): Avi Satov
- Vice Principal (JPPS): Renana Chemtov
- Vice Principal (Bialik): Sari Olishansky
- Grades: K–11
- Language: English, French, Yiddish, Hebrew
- Team name: JPPS Pugs, Bialik Bulldogs
- Affiliation: CAIS, QAIS, AJDS
- Website: jppsbialik.ca

The Jewish People's Schools and Peretz Schools (Yiddish: ײִדישע פאָלקס שולן און פרץ שולן, French: Les Écoles juives populaires et les Écoles Peretz), along with its secondary school Bialik High School (Yiddish: ביאַליק מיטלשול, French: École secondaire Bialik), is a private co-educational Jewish day school system. It is located in Côte Saint-Luc, an on-island suburb of Montreal, Quebec.

Established by members of the Labour Zionist Poale Zion movement in 1913, the school soon divided into two institutions, the Peretz Schools and the Jewish People's Schools. The two reunited in 1971, and Bialik High School was founded shortly thereafter. The JPPS–Bialik school system currently offers both English and French sections, as well as the International Baccalaureate Primary Years and Middle Years Programmes.

== History ==
=== The Peretz Schools ===
On 20 October 1910, the Fifth Poale Zion Convention held in Montreal passed Chaim Zhitlowsky's resolution for the establishment of a secular Yiddish-based school system across North America to transmit the movement's core Zionist and socialist ideals. A supplementary school called the National Radical School was established in 1913 in Montreal's Jewish immigrant quarter of the Mile End, meant as a secular alternative to the traditional synagogue schools of the 1870–1910s and the Talmud Torah system. The school expanded to over two hundred students by 1914. The school was not officially tied to the Poale Zion party, and by 1914 the party had lost control of the school to the Jewish Labour Bundist genosen.

In 1918, the National Radical School was renamed the Jewish Peretz Schools (Yiddish: ײִדישע פרץ שולן, Yiddishe Peretz Shuln) after writer I. L. Peretz, and purchased its first building on Cadieux Street near Prince Arthur Street. The secular Jewish curriculum was centred on the Yiddish language and literature, as well as on Jewish history and folklore. Principals and teachers invited international Yiddish figures into the classroom; guests of the Peretz Schools during the 1920s and 1930s included Aaron Glants-Leyeles, Sholem Asch, Peretz Hirschbein, David Pinski, Shmuel Niger, and Chaim Zhitlowsky. By the mid-twenties, both Hebrew and the study of Jewish tradition were introduced into the Peretz Schools' curriculum.

Moving to a renovated factory on Duluth Street, the school added a kindergarten in 1941, and established a full-day school in 1942. The school remained on Duluth until 1960 when it moved to Wavell Road in Côte Saint-Luc following the westward migration of the Jewish community.

=== The Jewish People's Schools ===
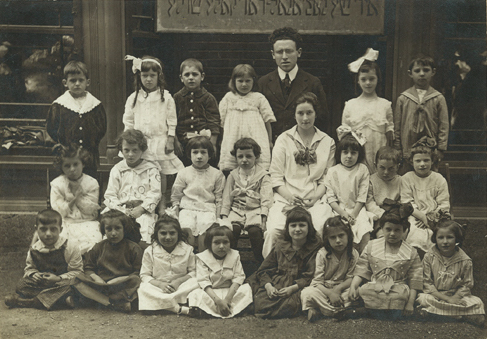
J. I. Segal with afternoon school class of Jewish People's School, c. 1918.

The emphasis on Yiddish over Hebrew at the National Radical School was hotly debated, and a group of dissident activists emerged. In 1914, a group of educators led by Dr. Yehuda Kaufman, Moshe Dickstein and Abraham Parnass, broke away from the National Radical School to establish the independent Jewish People's Schools (Yiddish: ײִדישע פאָלקס שולן, Yidishe Folks Shuln; Hebrew: בתי ספר עממיים יהודיים). Classes initially took place in a house, with volunteers as teachers. The new school emphasized the equal importance of Hebrew and Yiddish in Jewish life, and placed greater emphasis on Jewish tradition than did the National Radical School. The school would eventually settle on St. Urbain Street near St. Cuthbert Street in 1920, staying there until 1952. A second building (designed by architect Maxwell M. Kalman) opened in 1926 on the corner of Waverly and Fairmount, remaining there until 1963.

In 1927, the Jewish People's Schools established itself as an all-day Jewish school, the first in Montreal since the synagogue schools of the 1880s–1900s. The school taught public school curricula along with Jewish education, history, and literature, Hebrew and Yiddish, and the ideology of the Labour Zionist movement, at the cost of ten cents per week. As the Jewish community migrated westward, a new branch was built at Van Horne Avenue and Westbury Avenue in 1956. While the Jewish People's Schools moved in the direction of Outremont's middle-class element, the Peretz Schools continued to serve more of the working class elements of the Jewish community.

=== Modern history ===
Except for the Peretz Schools' continued stress of Yiddish over Hebrew, by the 1920s the overall philosophy, educational objectives and pedagogical approaches of the Peretz and Jewish People's Schools were essentially the same. Still, despite the efforts that were made to reunite the schools beginning in the 1920s, ideological differences prevented the Peretz and Jewish People's Schools from merging for half a century. In 1971, financial necessity (as well as the retirement of their two long-term principals) led to the merger of the Jewish People's School and the Peretz Schools. The unified educational system created Bialik High School a year later, offering a comprehensive curriculum of both secular and Jewish education for secondary students.

In 2003, the elementary school's Wavell and Van Horne branches were consolidated and the Wavell location sold. A merger of JPPS–Bialik schools with UTT–Herzliah was announced in February 2011, but was soon rejected. In 2016, JPPS–Bialik announced the sale of its elementary school building on Van Horne Avenue to the Donald Berman Yaldei Developmental Center. The decision was made in response to declining enrollment, prompting the relocation of elementary students to the Bialik High School campus in Côte Saint-Luc. Before the winter break of that year, students packed the contents of their desks into boxes. Upon returning in the new year, they unpacked their belongings at their new campus.

=== COVID-19 measures ===
On March 13, 2020, in response to the COVID-19 pandemic, the Government of Quebec ordered all schools in the province, including JPPS–Bialik, to close for 14 days as a precautionary measure. The school administration closely monitored the public health situation in coordination with Federation CJA, MEES, and other Jewish day schools. As per the province's directive, all in-person classes and scheduled programs at JPPS–Bialik were suspended effective immediately. The initial closure was set until March 27, 2020, but was later extended. To mitigate disruptions to learning, Bialik High School students transitioned to online classes beginning March 17, 2020.

In August 2020, JPPS–Bialik introduced a hybrid learning model, combining in-person and online instruction. The school also implemented class bubbles, limiting interactions between student groups to reduce potential COVID-19 transmission. By August 2021, JPPS–Bialik had returned to full-time in-person learning and discontinued the use of class bubbles, aligning with updated provincial public health guidelines.

== Notable people ==
- David Botwinik (1920–2022), composer
- Jamie Elman (1976– ), actor
- Mitch Garber (1964– ), business executive
- Gilah Yelin Hirsch (1944– ), artist
- Kelly Kruger (1982– ), actress
- Alison Levine (1990– ), boccia player
- Jonathan Mann (1960– ), journalist
- Sarah Mlynowski (1977– ), author
- J. I. Segal (1896–1954), Yiddish poet and journalist
- Yechiel Shainblum, painter and sculptor
- Shulamis Yelin (1913–2002), writer and educator
