= R.G. Everson =

Canadian poet (1903–1992)

Ronald Gilmour Everson (November 18, 1903 – February 16, 1992) was a Canadian poet born in Oshawa ON. He studied at University of Toronto (B.A. 1927) and Upper Canada Law School (LL.B. 1930). In university, he was an editor of the literary publication Acta Victoriana. After graduating university, he married Lorna Jean Austin on April 15, 1931, and then lived in a cabin near Huntsville, Ontario for five years. He worked at a public relations firm, called Johnston, Everson & Charlesworth Ltd., in Montreal from 1936-1969. In 1957, he published his first book of poetry, Three Dozen Poems. He was a founding member of the publishing company Delta Books in Montreal, and the poet support organization The League of Canadian Poets. After spending most of his life in Montreal, he moved to Burlington, ON, Canada, where he died February 16, 1992.

He participated in Dial-A-Poem Montreal 1985-1987.

== Publications ==
=== Poetry ===
- Three Dozen Poems. Montreal, QC: Cambridge Press, 1957.
- A Lattice for Momos. Contact Press, 1958.
- Blind Man's Holiday. Toronto, ON: Ryerson Press, 1963.
- Four Poems. Norwich, VT: American Letters Press, 1963.
- Wrestle with an Angel. Montreal, QC: Delta Canada, 1965.
- Incident on Cote des Neiges, and other poems. Amherst, MA: Green Knight Press, 1966.
- Raby Head, and other poems. Amherst, MA: Green Knight Press, 1967.
- The Dark is Not So Dark. Montreal, QC: Delta Canada, 1969.
- Elinor's Mouth-hole. Santa Barbara, CA: Unicorn Press, 1969.
- Selected Poems, 1920-1970. Montreal, QC: Delta Canada, 1970.
- Indian Summer. Ottawa, ON: Oberon, 1976.
- Carnival. Ottawa, ON: Oberon, 1978.
- Everson at Eighty. Ottawa, ON: Oberon, 1983.
- Poems About Me. Ottawa, ON: Oberon, 1990.
