= Joshua Mensch =

Canadian poet

Joshua Mensch is a Canadian poet. He is most noted for his 2018 poetry collection Because: A Lyric Memoir, which was shortlisted for the Governor General's Award for English-language poetry at the 2018 Governor General's Awards.

Originally from Nova Scotia, he was educated at the University of Tennessee at Chattanooga and the University of Maryland, College Park, and currently lives and works in Prague, Czech Republic.
