= 2018 Governor General's Awards =

Canadian literary award

The shortlisted nominees for the 2018 Governor General's Awards for Literary Merit were announced on October 3, 2018, and the winners were announced on October 30.

== English ==
Category	Winner	Nominated
Fiction	Sarah Henstra, The Red Word	Paige Cooper, Zolitude; Rawi Hage, Beirut Hellfire Society; Miriam Toews, Women Talking; Joshua Whitehead, Jonny Appleseed
Non-fiction	Darrel J. McLeod, Mamaskatch: A Cree Coming of Age	Carys Cragg, Dead Reckoning: How I Came To Meet the Man Who Murdered My Father; Aida Edemariam, The Wife’s Tale: A Personal History; Terese Marie Mailhot, Heart Berries; Abu Bakr Al-Rabeeah and Winnie Yeung, Homes: A Refugee Story
Poetry	Cecily Nicholson, Wayside Sang	Billy-Ray Belcourt, This Wound Is a World; Dionne Brand, The Blue Clerk; Joshua Mensch, Because: A Lyric Memoir; Jason Stefanik, Night Became Years
Drama	Jordan Tannahill, Botticelli in the Fire & Sunday in Sodom	Keith Barker, This Is How We Got Here; Anna Chatterton, Evalyn Parry and Karin Randoja, Gertrude and Alice; Anosh Irani, The Men in White; Erin Shields, Paradise Lost
Children's literature	Jonathan Auxier, Sweep: The Story of a Girl and Her Monster	Christopher Paul Curtis, The Journey of Little Charlie; Janice Lynn Mather, Learning to Breathe; Lindsay Mattick and Josh Greenhut, Winnie's Great War; Heather Smith, Ebb & Flow
Children's illustration	Jillian Tamaki, They Say Blue	The Fan Brothers, Ocean Meets Sky; Shauntay Grant and Eva Campbell, Africville; Wab Kinew and Joe Morse, Go Show the World: A Celebration of Indigenous Heroes; Werner Zimmermann, At the Pond
French to English translation	Phyllis Aronoff and Howard Scott, Descent Into Night (Edem Awumey, Explication de la nuit)	Vivian Felsen, Jacob Isaac Segal: A Montreal Yiddish Poet and His Milieu (Pierre Anctil, Jacob-Isaac Segal (1896-1954) : un poète yiddish de Montréal et son milieu); Aleshia Jensen, Explosions: Michael Bay and the Pyrotechnics of the Imagination (Mathieu Poulin, Des explosions); Peter McCambridge, Songs for the Cold of Heart (Éric Dupont, La fiancée américaine); Rhonda Mullins, Little Beast (Julie Demers, Barbe)

== French ==
Category	Winner	Nominated
Fiction	Karoline Georges, De synthèse	Christophe Bernard, La bête creuse; Maxime Raymond Bock, Les noyades secondaires; Naomi Fontaine, Manikanetish; Olivier Sylvestre, Noms fictifs
Non-fiction	Frédérick Lavoie, Avant l’après : voyages à Cuba avec George Orwell	Pierre Anctil, Histoire des juifs du Québec; Denys Delâge and Jean-Philippe Warren, Le piège de la liberté : les peuples autochtones dans l’engrenage des régimes coloniaux; Gabrielle Giasson-Dulude, Les chants du mime : en compagnie d’Étienne Decroux; Anne-Marie Saint-Cerny, Mégantic
Poetry	Michaël Trahan, La raison des fleurs	Daria Colonna, Ne faites pas honte à votre siècle; Roxane Desjardins, Le revers; Catherine Lalonde, La dévoration des fées; France Théoret, Cruauté du jeu
Drama	Anne-Marie Olivier, Venir au monde	Christine Beaulieu, J'aime Hydro; Steve Gagnon, La montagne blanche; Guillaume Lapierre-Desnoyers, Invisibles; Michel Tremblay, Enfant insignifiant!
Children's literature	Mario Brassard, Ferdinand F., 81 ans, chenille	Jonathan Bécotte, Maman veut partir; Jocelyn Boisvert, Un dernier songe avant le grand sommeil; Camille Bouchard, 13000 ans et des poussières; Brigitte Vaillancourt, Les marées
Children's illustration	Marianne Dubuc, Le chemin de la montagne	Marianne Ferrer and India Desjardins, Une histoire de cancer qui finit bien; Gabriella Gendreau and Nahid Kazemi, Les mots d'Eunice; Jacques Goldstyn, Jules et Jim : frères d’armes; Nicole Testa and Annie Boulanger, Lili Macaroni : je suis comme je suis!
English to French translation	Lori Saint-Martin and Paul Gagné, Le monde selon Barney (Mordecai Richler, Barney's Version)	Éric Fontaine, Sweetland (Michael Crummey, Sweetland); Daniel Grenier and William S. Messier, De l’utilité de l’ennui : textes de balle (Andrew Forbes, The Utility of Boredom: Baseball Essays); Laurence Gough, Naissances (Kate Cayley, How You Were Born); Catherine Leroux, Le saint patron des merveilles (Mark Frutkin, Fabrizio's Return)
