= Jason Stefanik =

Canadian poet

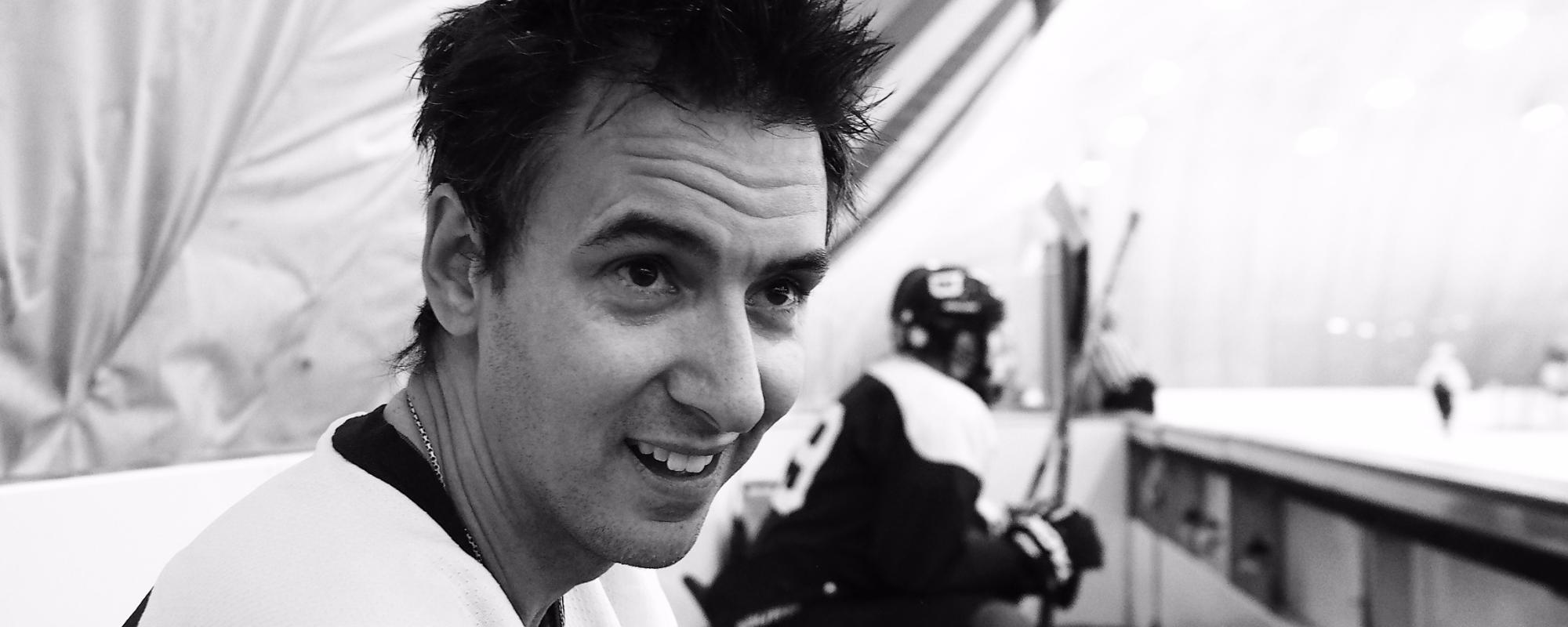
Jason Stefanik, circa 2018, via Poetry in Voice

Jason Stefanik is a Canadian poet. He is most noted for his 2018 poetry collection Night Became Years, which was shortlisted for the Governor General's Award for English-language poetry at the 2018 Governor General's Awards.

Raised in the Interlake region of Manitoba, Stefanik is based in Winnipeg. He was a founding member of the city's neither/neither arts collective, and has taught creative writing workshops for inmates at the Stony Mountain Institution.
