= Carys Cragg =

Canadian social worker and writer

- Occupations: Social worker, writer
- Employer: Douglas College
- Notable work: Dead Reckoning: How I Came To Meet the Man Who Murdered My Father
- Awards: Finalist, Governor General's Awards for English-language non-fiction (2018)

Carys Cragg is a Canadian social worker and writer. She is most noted for her book Dead Reckoning: How I Came To Meet the Man Who Murdered My Father, which was a shortlisted finalist for the Governor General's Award for English-language non-fiction at the 2018 Governor General's Awards.

Cragg, now a youth outreach worker in Vancouver, British Columbia and an instructor at Douglas College, grew up in Calgary, Alberta as the daughter of Geoffrey Cragg, a doctor who was killed in 1992 by an armed robber who had broken into their home. As an adult, she undertook a restorative justice project of corresponding with and eventually meeting the killer, which she documented in the book.
