= The Red Word =

Novel by Sarah Henstra

- First edition
- Author: Sarah Henstra
- Language: English
- Publisher: ECW Press
- Publication date: 2018
- Publication place: Canada
- Media type: Print (hardcover, paperback)
- Preceded by: Mad Miss Mimic

The Red Word is a novel by Canadian writer Sarah Henstra, published in 2018 by ECW Press.

An exploration of contemporary gender politics and rape culture, the novel centres on Karen Huls, a sophomore at university who moves in with a group of feminist activist roommates while simultaneously getting romantically involved with a member of "Gang Bang Central", a campus fraternity being targeted by her roommates due to its toxic and sexist culture.

The novel won the Governor General's Award for English-language fiction at the 2018 Governor General's Awards.
