= Maxime Raymond Bock =

Canadian writer (born 1981)

- Born: 1981 (age 44–45); Montreal, Quebec, Canada
- Occupation: Writer
- Writing career
- Period: 2011–present
- Notable work: Les noyades secondaires

Maxime Raymond Bock (born 1981) is a Canadian writer from Quebec. He is most noted for his 2017 short story collection Les noyades secondaires, which was a shortlisted finalist for the Governor General's Award for French-language fiction at the 2018 Governor General's Awards.

His debut short story collection Atavismes was published in 2011, and won the Prix Adrienne-Choquette in 2012. He followed up with the novellas Rosemont de profil in 2013 and Des lames de pierre in 2015. Both Atavismes and Des lames de pierre have been published in English translation, as Atavisms (2015) and Baloney (2016).

A graduate of the Université du Québec à Montréal, he is currently a doctoral student at the Université de Montréal.
