= Vivian Felsen =

Canadian translator and visual artist

- Education: University of Toronto
- Occupations: translator, artist
- Awards: Canadian Jewish Book Award, J. I. Segal Award

Vivian Felsen is a Canadian translator from French and Yiddish into English, and a visual artist of Jewish origin. She is the recipient of the Canadian Jewish Book Award (2001) and J. I. Segal Award (2004, 2018) for her translations dealing with Canadian Jewish history and Holocaust memoirs.

== Early life and education ==
Vivian Felsen comes from Toronto, her grandfather was the Jewish journalist Israel Medres. She holds a B.A. and M.A. from the University of Toronto, where she studied French and Russian language and literature, and a law degree from York University.

== Career ==
=== Translation ===
Felsen works as a translator from French and Yiddish into English. She began her career with translations of two books by Israel Medres, for which she received a Canadian Jewish Book Award (2001) and a J. I. Segal Award (2004). She has since translated books on Canadian Jewish history, Holocaust memoirs as well as short stories written by Jewish women writers. The stories were published, among others, in The Exile Book of Yiddish Women Writers, an anthology edited by Frieda Johles Forman, which was awarded with a Canadian Jewish Book Award (2014). Felsen's translation of Rabbi Pinchas Hirschprung's Holocaust memoir titled The Veil of Tears was awarded a gold medal in the autobiography/memoir category of Independent Publisher Book Awards as well as a J. I. Segal Award (both 2018). She was also nominated for the Governor General's Award for her rendition from French of the book J. I. Segal: a Montreal Yiddish Poet and His Milieu (2018). Her translations of poems by J. I. Segal later appeared in the journal Canadian Jewish Studies.

Apart from translating, Felsen has also authored texts on Yiddish culture and literature. She has contributed to New Readings of Yiddish Montreal — Traduire le Montréal yiddish edited by Pierre Anctil, Norman Ravvin and Sherry Simon (2007), written an essay on Canadian Yiddish literature for Kanade, di Goldene Medine?: Perspectives on Canadian-Jewish Literature and Culture / Perspectives sur la littérature et la culture juives canadiennes (2018), articles on Dora Shulner and Lili Berger for the Jewish Women's Archive website and on Israel Medres for the second edition of Encyclopaedia Judaica.

=== Visual arts ===
Felsen works as a visual artist, with a career spanning several decades. She taught drawing and painting at the Max the Mutt College of Animation, Art & Design, as well as through the Toronto Board of Education. Felsen's works have been exhibited, among others, at Palacio das Artes in Belo Horizonte, Brazil, and at the Gallery Arcturus. She has also been among the jurors for the Toronto Outdoor Art Exhibition, the Ontario Society of Artists, and the Society of Canadian Artists.

== Private life ==
One of her sons studied at Mir Yeshiva in Jerusalem and is now an Orthodox rabbi.

== Book translations ==
=== From Yiddish ===
- Israel Medres: Montreal of yesterday: Jewish life in Montreal, 1900-1920 (Montreal fun nekhtn), 2000
- Israel Medres: Between the wars: Canadian Jews in Transition (Tsvishn tsvey velt milkhomes), 2003
- Yankl Nirenberg: Memoirs of the Lodz Ghetto, 2003
- Michael Kutz: If, by Miracle, 2013
- Bronia and Joseph Beker: Joy Runs Deeper, 2014
- Pinchas Hirschprung: The Veil of Tears (Fun natsishen yomertol), 2016

=== From French ===
- Paul Schaffer: The Veiled Sun: From Auschwitz to New Beginning (Le Soleil voilé, Auschwitz 1942–1945), with original introduction by Simone Veil, 2015
- Pierre Anctil: J. I. Segal (1896–1954): A Montreal Yiddish Poet and His Milieu, 2017
