= Shulamis Yelin =

Canadian Jewish writer and educator

Shulamis Yelin (April 12, 1913 – June 24, 2002) was a Canadian Jewish writer and educator.

Born in Montreal, Quebec to parents who had emigrated from Chernobyl, Yelin was an alumna of Macdonald College, from which she graduated in 1932; she then studied at Columbia Union Teachers College before completing an MA at the University of Montreal in 1961. At varying times during her career she taught students at every level, from early childhood to university. In 1941 she established the first day school kindergarten at the J. Peretz School, and from 1953 until 1954 she was assistant principal of the Young Israel Day School. During the 1960s she taught English at the Hebrew University in Jerusalem. She was among the founders of the Reconstructionist synagogue in Montreal. As a writer Yelin won a number of awards for her work, which reflected her experiences growing up in Montreal's Jewish community and the yiddishkeit by which she had been surrounded from childhood. Her poetry collection Seeded in Sinai was published in 1975; other works include Shulamis: Stories from a Montreal Childhood (1983) and Au soleil de ma nuit (1985). She also developed a syllabus, The Jew in Canada: 1760 - 1960, for use in Canadian schools, and she was a frequent guest on Canadian radio and television programs. She suffered for much of her career from mental illness, a condition documented in the book Demonic to Divine: The Double Life of Shulamis Yelin, which was published in 2014.

She participated in Dial-A-Poem Montreal from 1985 to 1987.

== Works ==
- Seeded in Sinai. New York: Reconstructionist Press. 1975.
- Shulamis : stories from a montreal childhood. Montreal: Véhicule Press. 1983. ISBN 978-0-919890-52-7.
- Many mirrors many faces. London, Ontario: South Western Ontario Poetry. 1986.
- Where all her wars are marked. Outremont, Quebec: Over the Moon. 2002.
