= Israel Medres =

Canadian Journalist

- Born: 1894; Lekhovich, Minsk Governorate, Russian Empire
- Died: 6 August 1964 (aged 69–70); Montreal, Quebec, Canada
- Resting place: Baron de Hirsch Cemetery, Montreal
- Relatives: Vivian Felsen (granddaughter)
- Writing career
- Pen name: Ben Mordecai
- Language: Yiddish

Israel Jonah Medres (Yiddish: ישראל יונה מדרש; 1894 – August 6, 1964) was a Canadian Yiddish journalist and writer.

== Biography ==
Israel Medres was born in Lekhovich, Russian Empire, in 1894. He studied for three years at the yeshiva of Lida. At the age of 16 he immigrated to Canada, where he joined the staff of the Keneder Adler in 1922.

== Publications ==
- Montreal fun nekhtn [Montreal of Yesterday] (in Yiddish). 1947.
- Tsvishn tsvey velt milkhomes [Between Two World Wars] (in Yiddish). 1964.
