= Rikuda Potash =

Rikuda Potash (Hebrew: רִיקוּדָה פּוֹטַש; Yiddish: רקודה פּאָטאַש; 1906 – 15 May 1965) was a Polish-born Israeli Yiddish language poet and short story writer. Sholem Asch called her "the Poetess of Jerusalem".

== Biography ==
Potash was born in Ojców. Her father Yekutiel Potash was a correspondent for the Yiddish newspaper Unzer Lebn. Her brother Mordekhai Narkiss (1898–1957) later became director of the Bezalel Museum.

Potash's early work was written and published in Polish, but following the Lwów pogrom of 1918 she turned to Yiddish. Beginning in 1922 she published a variety of works in Yiddish, including nature poetry, short stories, children's stories, and translations of Polish works. In 1924, she moved to Łódź, which at the time had the Poland's second-largest population of Jews and was a center of modernist experimentation. She married poet Khayim-Leyb Fuks and they had a daughter, Avivit, in 1926. She first came to widespread attention after the inclusion of four of her poems in Ezra Korman's Yidishe dikhterins: antologye ("Yiddish Women Poets: Anthology", 1928). Her first collection of poetry, Vint oyf klavishn ("Wind on Keys"), was published in Łódź in 1934. The title refers to the lyre of King David, which, according to Berakhot, hung over his bed and played by itself when the wind blew across it.

In 1934, she divorced Fuks and emigrated with Avivit to Jerusalem, where she worked as librarian for the Bezalel Art School and Museum for the rest of her life. She published two more volumes of poetry, Fun Kidron Tol (1952) and Moled iber Timma (1959). Two more books were published posthumously, Lider ("Poems", 1967) and Geslekh fun Yerusholayim ("In the Alleys of Jerusalem", 1968), the latter her only collection of prose, stories about Mizrahi immigrants to Israel and their children.
