= Rachmil Bryks =

Yiddish author and poet (1912-1974)

- Born: Rachmil Leib Bryks; 18 April 1912; Skarżysko-Kamienna, Skarżysko County, Świętokrzyskie Voivodeship, Poland
- Died: October 2, 1974 (aged 62); New York City, U.S.
- Occupation: Writer, Poet
- Language: Yiddish
- Genre: Novels, Novellas, short stories, poems

Rachmil Leib Bryks (April 18, 1912 - October 2, 1974) (Yiddish and Hebrew: ירחמיאל בריקס) was a Yiddish author and poet known for his writings based on his own experiences as a young Jewish man under the Nazis during World War II. He wrote five books about the Holocaust period, in Sweden and in the United States after his liberation from the Łódź Ghetto and the Nazi camps, including Auschwitz.

Throughout his four years in the Łódź Ghetto (May 1940 – August 1944), he had sat in the evenings after a hard day's work and had written by hand many pages of poetry and prose, describing the hunger, pain, and anguish that the Jewish people were enduring. He was a member of an underground group of Yiddish Writers which met at Miriam Ulinover's home in the Lodz Ghetto, each reading to her his poetry and awaiting her comments. Realizing their historic importance, Bryks had buried his papers underground within the ghetto borders before he was deported to Auschwitz on August 24, 1944.

Bryks's best known works include A Cat in the Ghetto (Yiddish: אַ קאַץ אין געטאָ; Hebrew: חתול בגטו) which was translated to English and Hebrew, and Ghetto Factory 76 (Chemical waste conversion) (Yiddish: געטאָ־פֿאַבריק 76 (״כעמישע אָפּפֿאַל־פֿערװערטונג״)) which was dramatized as Resort 76 by Shimon Wincelberg.

== Biography ==
Rachmil Bryks (Yiddish and Hebrew: ירחמיאל בריקס) was born in 1912 in a small east european shtetl Skarżysko-Kamienna, Poland which lies between Radom and Kielc in Poland. He was the third of a family of four brothers and four sisters and was raised in an Orthodox Jewish home. Although his father Tuvya was a Hassid and a devout scholar, Bryks was sent not only to a Cheder but also received a secular education.

At the age of 14, his family left Skarzysko for Łódź, where Bryks helped support his family, working as a hat maker and a housepainter in the large industrial city. His artistic talents began to flourish here. He studied drama and performed in the Yiddish Theater of Lodz. In 1937 Bryks's first work "Shderot" was printed in a Yiddish newsletter. In 1939, his book of lyric poems "Yung Grin Mai" (English: "Young Green May"; Yiddish: יונג גרין מאי) was published in Lodz to great critical acclaim.

In May 1940, Bryks found himself fenced inside the infamous Łódź Ghetto. In spite of indescribable conditions, he began here to set forth his literary work and was a member of the literary circle which met regularly in the home of the poetess Miriam Ulinover.

In August 1944, the Lodz Ghetto was liquidated by the Germans, and Bryks was sent out of the ghetto in the last transport to the death camp, Auschwitz. His camp number was 50763.

As he was a healthy young man, he was sent to Germany to do forced labor in a chemical waste utilization plant in Vechelde, Germany.

He was transferred to the Wattestadt-Wedtlenstedt camp, then Ravensbruck, and finally to the Wöbbelin concentration camp where the American Army liberated him on May 2, 1945. He was brought to the Bergen-Belsen hospital; sick, weak and half-dead. The Red Cross brought him to Sweden for treatment. He had to undergo an operation where two-thirds of his stomach was removed. In spite of his suffering, while in the hospitals and sanitoria, he continued his literary work, and recited his poems before the groups of Jewish refugees arriving in Stockholm in order to encourage them.

At one such gathering, he met a young Transylvanian woman, Hinda Irene Wolf, an Auschwitz and a Bergen-Belsen survivor. They married in the Great Synagogue on September 15, 1946. Their two daughters Myriam Serla and Bella Svea were both born in Stockholm, Sweden.

From Stockholm, Bryks carried on an extensive correspondence with Professor Max Weinreich of the YIVO – (Yiddish Research Institute) in New York, providing the prestigious institution with important documents of the Lodz Ghetto including requisition of the Sonnabend Archive and of Scandinavian Jewry. In March 1949, with YIVO sponsorship and the aid of HIAS (the Hebrew Immigrant Aid Society), the family immigrated to the United States on the SS Stockholm on March 15, 1949.

Bryks spent the last 29 years of his life writing about the Holocaust until his untimely death in New York City from a stroke in October 1974 at the age of 62. His casket was flown to Israel for burial on the Mt. of Olives in Jerusalem.
