= Artie Gold =

Artie Gold (15 January 1947 – 14 February 2007) was a Montreal-based Canadian poet who rose to prominence in the 1970s as a member of the circle of Montreal-based writers known as The Vehicule Poets. Characterized as one of the wildest and most daring of the Vehicule poets, Gold was influenced by the work of Jack Spicer and Frank O'Hara, his cats (to whom he was allergic) and his myriad eclectic autodidact interests. Though plagued by illness throughout his life, he worked prolifically and was always less interested in fame or academic placement than he was in creating poetry "at the front of the arts". In a tribute to Gold, the Montreal Gazette considered him "one of Canada's finest poets".

== Bibliography ==
- cityflowers, Delta Press, Montreal, 1974
- Even Yr Photograph Looks Afraid of Me, Talon Books, Vancouver, 1975
- Mixed Doubles, with Geoff Young, The Figures, Berkeley, 1975
- 5 Jockey Poems, The Word Book Store, Montreal, 1977
- Some of the Cat Poems, CrossCountry Press, Montreal, 1978
- before Romantic Words, Vehicule Press, Montreal, 1979
- The Beautiful Chemical Waltz, Selected Poems, The Muses' Company, Montreal, 1992
- Hotel Victoria, Above Ground Press, Ottawa, 2003
- The Collected Books of Artie Gold, Talon Books, Vancouver, 2010
