= Peter van Toorn =

Canadian poet (1944–2021)

Peter van Toorn (1944 – October 6, 2021) was a Canadian poet. His 1984 collection Mountain Tea was shortlisted for the Governor General's Award for English-language poetry.

Van Toorn, born in the Netherlands, immigrated to Canada with his family during childhood. He attended McGill University, and taught for almost 30 years at John Abbott College. He published the collections Leeway Grass (1970) and In Guildenstern County (1973) and edited the anthologies Cross/cut: Contemporary English Quebec Poetry (1982) and The Insecurity of Art: Essays on Poetics (1982), prior to the publication of Mountain Tea. Though Van Toorn published no new work after Mountain Tea, Véhicule Press reissued this collection in 2003.

== Works ==
- Leeway Grass. Montreal: Delta Canada, 1970.
- Love Song. New York: Doctor Generosity Press, 1970.
- Four Montreal Poets (by Peter Van Toorn, Marc Plourde, Arty Gold, & Richard Sommer; edited by David Solway). Fredericton, NB: Fiddlehead Poetry Books, 1973.
- In Guilderstern County. Lasalle, QC: Delta Canada, 1973.
- Mountain Stick. Montreal: Versus, 1976.
- Mountain Tea, and other poems. Toronto: McClelland and Stewart, 1984. ISBN 0-7710-8714-4
  - Mountain Tea. Montreal: Véhicule Press, 2003.
