= Renato Trujillo =

Chilean-Canadian poet and writer

Renato Trujillo (Unknown date, 1942 - October 28, 2000) was a Chilean-Canadian poet and writer. He was proficient in many languages. He was fluent in French, English and Spanish, and knowledgeable of Portuguese and Italian. He moved to Quebec in the late 1960s and wrote exclusively in English. His poems were of confessional nature, touching on subjects relating to love, abandonment, solitude, ageing, and transcendence.

His work has been included in the anthology Making a Difference: Canadian Multicultural Literature (Toronto: Oxford UP, 1996).

== Publications ==
=== Poetry ===
- Rooms: Milongas for Prince Arthur Street. Fredericton, NB: Goose Lane Editions, 1989.
- Poems and Anti-Poems. Fredericton, NB: Goose Lane Editions, 1987.
