= The Vehicule Poets =

Poet collective in Montreal

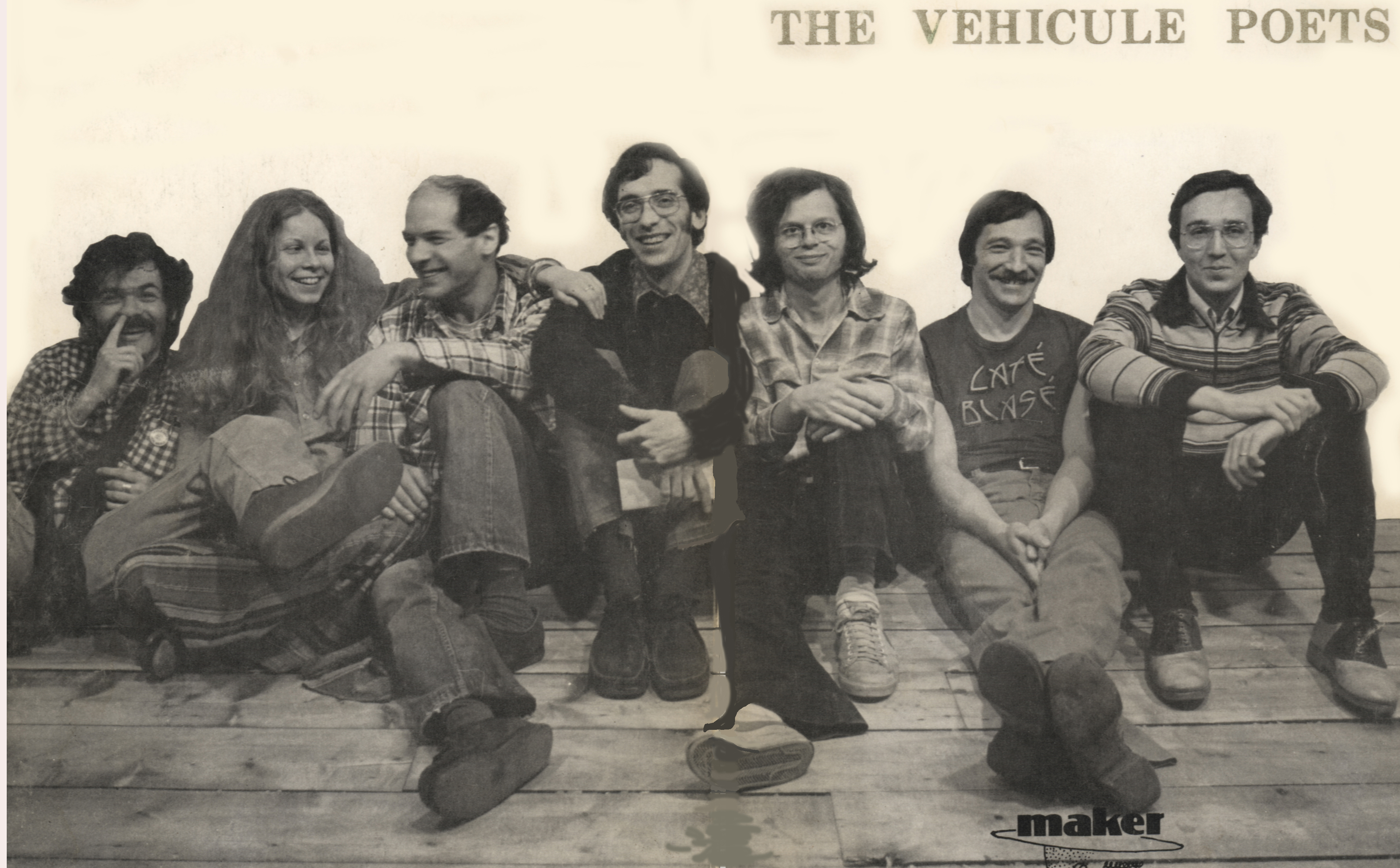
- Left to right: Endre Farkas, Claudia Lapp, Artie Gold, John McAuley, Ken Norris, Tom Konyves, Stephen Morrissey
- Writing career
- Language: English
- Genre: Poetry

The Vehicule Poets was a collective formed in Montreal in the 1970s by poets Endre Farkas, Artie Gold, Tom Konyves, Claudia Lapp, John McAuley, Stephen Morrissey and Ken Norris, who shared an interest in experimental American poetry and European avant-garde literature and art. While they were each distinct in their own writing, and published books as individuals, they were collectively involved in organizing readings, art events, and in controlling their own means of literary production through the development of a variety of periodicals and collective publishing ventures. In 1979, John McAuley’s Maker Press published a collective anthology, The Vehicule Poets. Six of the original Vehicule poets are still active as poets, artists and teachers. Artie Gold died on Valentine's Day, 2007.

"The Vehicule Poets bonded together long enough to form one of the most cohesive poetry movements in Canada since the early 1960s… The group was a beehive of activity, collaborating to produce some of Montreal's most original multimedia performances, collage texts, videopoems, literary magazines and books." (The Montreal Gazette, April 3, 2004)

“This group of poets who gathered in the mid-70s around the alternative gallery Vehicule Art Inc. and the printing operation Vehicule Press was initially interested in gaining access to the means of production. But a funny thing happened on the way to print. The various poets coalesced into a group, feeding off each other's experiences and innovations. Inspired by the experimental environment of the gallery, the Vehicule Poets worked at the cutting edge of mixed media, poetry and video art. They took poetry out of the closet and put it on the buses, in the parks, on the dance floor and in the subway. The Vehicule Poets were an irreverent, adventurous lot, provoking both praise and vitriol from the public and the critics.” (Introduction to Vehicule Days: An Unorthodox History of Montreal's Vehicule Poets by Ken Norris)

“That this collection of essential people (then) is a set or subset that would seem to exhaust with the seven is probably a claim that I should confess, like the title, is a trifle more convenient than true...nevertheless, in these seven writers and their works, a world begins to emerge that might merit a separate look. Not as one, then, do we present ourselves, but AT ONCE.” (Introduction to The Vehicule Poets, Artie Gold)

“All seven poets seem intent on proving the truth of Louis Dudek’s observation that ‘it is the destiny of Montreal to show the country from time to time what poetry is.’” (John Robert Columbo, Globe and Mail)

“In the history of recent English-language poetry in Montreal, the Vehicule group, Ken Norris, Stephen Morrissey, Tom Konyves, Claudia Lapp, Artie Gold, John McAuley and Endre Farkas, provided a very welcome radical chapter." (Introduction to The Vehicule Poets_Now, George Bowering)

== Publications ==
The Vehicule Poets, Maker Press (1979)
Vehicule Days: An Unorthodox History of Montreal’s Vehicule Poets, Nuage Editions (1993)
The Vehicule Poets_Now, The Muses Company (2004)
