= Alexander Bercovitch =

Canadian artist (1891-1951)

- Born: March 15, 1891; Kherson, Ukraine
- Died: January 7, 1951 (aged 59); Montreal
- Burial place: Baron de Hirsch Cemetery, Montreal
- Education: Jerusalem's Art School of Bezalel, the Munich Academy of Fine Arts, and briefly at the Bakst-Dobujiinsky school and Stiglitz Academy, both in St. Petersburg
- Known for: painter, set designer and teacher
- Spouse(s): Bryna Avrutick (m. 1915); Baila V’Dovitz

Alexander Bercovitch (March 15, 1891 – January 07, 1951) was a painter, set designer and teacher, known for his lively picturing and Expressionist intensity of colour. He was an important part of the art scene in Montreal in the 1930s and 1940s, as well as a founding member of the Eastern Group of Painters in 1938 and the Contemporary Arts Society in 1939.

== Career ==
Bercovitch was born in Kherson, Ukraine. As a boy of nine, he watched the painting of icons at the local monastery and it fascinated him. The monks gave him basic painting lessons and by age 15, he was designing sets and costumes for Kherson's Yiddish language theatre groups. In 1907, He went to Jerusalem to study at the Bezalel School of Arts and Crafts, then returned to Kerson in 1910 and that year moved to St Petersburg to attend the Bakst-Dobujinsky school. In 1911 Bercovitch won a Dr. Nathan Strauss Scholarship to study in Munich at the Munich Academy of Fine Arts. His principal instructor there was Franz von Stuck but he was most influenced by Lovis Corinth with whom he studied briefly.

The First World War interrupted his studies. He was conscripted, deserted and went into hiding for 3 years. In 1915, he married Russian revolutionary Bryna Avrutick. In 1917, he worked as a set designer for the Odessa Opera House. He also met and married Baila V’Dovitz and fathered a son. In the fall of 1920 Bercovitch left his wife and son and went to Moscow. He worked an assistant to Ignaty Nivinsky, the set designer for the Habima, a Jewish theatre associated with the Moscow Art Theatre.

In 1922, Bercovitch went to the capital of Turkestan, Ashkabad, to teach art in a position offered him by Wassily Kandinsky — then Soviet Commissar for Art and Theatre - but in 1926, Bercovitch and his family emigrated to Canada, settling in Montreal. There he became part of a circle of painters which included Louis Muhlstock, Sam Borenstein, Harry Mayerovitch and Regina Seiden, among others.

In 1927, he began to exhibit at the Art Association of Montreal and exhibited there in 1928, 1929, 1932, and 1933 and at the Independent Art Association in 1932. In 1933, Sidney Carter gave Bercovitch a solo exhibition at his Drummond Street gallery. Bercovitch's second solo exhibition, held in 1934 at Eaton's Fine Art Galleries, was reviewed favorably by the critics.

He taught art at The Women's Hebrew Association (YWHA) in Montreal from 1934 to 1946, and had as his students Moe Reinblatt (who became his "student-in-charge"), Rita Briansky, Ghitta Caiserman, Esther Wertheimer and others.

In 1935, Bercovitch held a third solo exhibition, again at Eaton's Galleries. In 1936, he participated in six group exhibitions and in 1938 joined John Lyman and others in founding the Eastern Group of Painters, which was followed in 1939 by the Contemporary Arts Society.

Between 1934 and 1946, Bercovitch painted in the Gaspé Peninsula, sometimes with Allan Harrison and sometimes with Marc-Aurèle Fortin. In 1942, he was included in a four person show at the Art Gallery of Toronto. He had a solo exhibition of his work held at the seminary at Joliette in 1945.

In 1951, largely through the efforts of Moe Reinblatt, he was offered a solo show at the new YM/YWHA building in Montreal. The inaugural speaker was to be Dr. Max Stern, one of the leaders among Canadian art dealers, and the exhibition was to open at 7 p.m. on Sunday, January 7. Bercovitch suffered a massive heart before the ceremony and died. He is buried in Baron de Hirsch Cemetery, Montreal

The Jewish Public Library Archives has the fonds for the Robert Adams Collection which includes transcripts of interviews with Bercovitch.

== Selected public collections ==
- Musée national des beaux-arts du Québec
- National Gallery of Canada

== Legacy ==
In 2009 the Musée national des beaux-arts du Québec mounted a touring exhibition Jewish Painters of Montreal: a Witness to their time 1930-1948 which renewed interest in the group in Montreal, It was presented in Montreal by the McCord Museum.
