= Jewish Painters of Montreal =

Jewish Painters of Montreal refers to a group of artists who depicted the social realism of Montreal during the 1930s and 40s. First used by the media to describe participants of the annual YMHA-YWHA art exhibition, the term was popularized in the 1980s as the artists were exhibited collectively in public galleries across Canada. In 2009 the Musée national des beaux-arts du Québec organized a touring exhibition, Jewish Painters of Montreal: A Witness to Their Time, 1930–1948, which renewed interest in the group in Montreal, Toronto, and Vancouver.

This collective included multiple generations of painters: established artists Jack Beder (1910–1987), Alexander Bercovitch (1891–1951), Eric Goldberg (1890–1959), Louis Muhlstock (1904–2001); mid-career artists Sam Borenstein (1908–1969), Herman Heimlich (1904–1986), Harry Mayerovitch (1910–2004), Bernard Mayman (1885–1966), Ernst Neumann (1907–1956), Fanny Wiselberg (1906–1986); and then-emerging artists Sylvia Ary (1923–2011), Rita Briansky (1925–2025), Ghitta Caiserman-Roth (1923–2005), Alfred Pinsky (1921–19|fr99), and Moe Reinblatt (1917–1979). As a group during the 1930s and 40s, they were united in their choice of subjects — the human figure, Montreal and its people, and the War. As individual artists, their style varied from socialist realism to stylized expressionism.

== History ==
These artists were either new arrivals from Eastern Europe or children of immigrants from that region. All were trained artists with a deep appreciation of impressionism and post-impressionism. Most lived east of Mount Royal in Montreal's Jewish neighbourhood where, by 1926, Bercovitch, Mulstock and Reinblatt met informally at Bernard Mayman’s sign store on St Lawrence Boulevard. Following the opening of the new YMHA (Young Men's Hebrew Association) on Mount Royal Avenue in 1929, the group became associated with its annual art exhibition. As the Depression of the 1930s deepened, many of these artists found themselves in reduced circumstances. Louis Mulstock used discarded sugar sacks as canvas, while in 1936 Bercovitch took a teaching position at the YWHA (Young Women's Hebrew Association). There he instructed a new generation of artists including daughter Sylvia Ary, Ghitta Caisserman and Rita Briansky, all of whom included in the annual YMHA-YWHA art exhibition. Although there were discussions on creating a formal organization of Jewish Artists, as Bercovitch, Goldberg, Muhlstock, Mayervitch and Reinblatt were members of the 1938 Eastern Group of Painters and/or the 1939 Contemporary Arts Society, they were prohibited from other affiliations.

Many of these artists had socialistic leanings which was reflected in their art. Bercovitch had married Russian revolutionary Bryna Avrutick in 1915 and was hired to teach art in Turkestan by Wassily Kandinsky, then the Soviet Commisaire for Art and Theatre, in 1922. Muhlstock identified with the working class and referred to his imagery as "proletarian art", He later described his choice of subject matter as "something I had known and experienced and seen, and so it was the thing I wanted to express". Harry Mayerovitch wrote on social issues such as Montreal housing in the leftist Canadian Forum (Toronto): "Nothing has been done to alleviate the overcrowding of low wage earners; nothing to render slum property a less profitable investment; nothing to provide new housing for that shockingly large proportion of our population which lives in sub-standard dwellings ...". Of the younger generation, Caiserman (after 1964 Caiserman-Roth) was the daughter of Hananiah Meir Caiserman, a union organizer and Po’alei Zion (Labor Zionism) activist while Alfred Pinsky was the son of an American communist leader. In the late 30s and early 40s, Caisserman, Pinsky and Briansky attended the Art Students League of New York where they studied under muralist Harry Sternberg of the Federal Art Project. In New York they were exposed to the work of Mexican artists Diego Rivera and José Clemente Orozco and the social purpose of art was debated in both America and Canada. In 1941, Reinblatt viewed Orozco's 1932 mural in New York on his honeymoon while in 1948 both Caiserman and Pinsky, then married, traveled to Mexico to study mural art.

These artists also responded to the degradation of human rights in Nazi-Germany and Quebec's restrictive 1937 Padlock Law against socialist and communists. During the 30s, Muhlstock who was a member of the Canadian League Against War and Fascism later commented: "Perhaps if the war wasn’t on I might not have gone in that direction, you see." As Canada's military commitment deepened, World War 2 became a topic for paintings, cartoons and political posters. Mayerovitch, appointed art director for the National Film Board of Canada in 1940, produced many soviet-style posters, while Reinblatt enlisted in the Royal Canadian Air Force in 1942 and was an official Canadian War Artist by 1944. In 1945 Pinsky as union representative with the Royal Canadian Navy also choose war as a subject matter, but like Mulstock and Reinblatt depicted the workers behind the war effort rather than combat. Muhlstock's Female Worker, Rear View (1943), of a female worker dressed in coveralls depicted the gender equality of workers during the war years.

During the 30s and 40s, these artists exhibited in prominent venues of the day. All, with the exception of Sylvia Ary, exhibited at the Art Association of Montreal (now the Montreal Museum of Fine Arts annual exhibitions. In the mid 30s Mulstock exhibited with the Canadian Group of Painters in Toronto and along with Beder, Bercovitch, Borenstein, Goldberg, Mayman, and Wiselberg with the Contemporary Arts Society of Montreal. By 1948 the more senior artists of the group: Beder, Bercovitch, Borenstein, Heimlich, Mayervitch, Muhlstock, Neumann, and Reinblatt had all exhibited with the Royal Canadian Academy of Arts. Members of this group were also represented in the 40s by Montreal gallerist Rose Millman first at Dominion Gallery and after 1948 at West End Gallery. After the YM-YWHA moved from the downtown core in 1950, the West End Gallery increasingly served as a meeting place.

== Recognition ==
=== 1930–1949 ===
In the early 1930s Bercovitch, Muhlstock and Borenstein were recognized artists. In 1933 Bercovitch held his first solo exhibition at Sydney Carter Gallery which was reviewed favourably by Henri Girard. Mulhstock, considered one of the finest draughtsmen in the country. was singled out for his sensitive depictions of individuals by Montreal art critic Robert Ayre of The Gazette. By the mid-30s 1935 they were reviewed collectively in the Canadian Forum (Toronto): "The subject matter of [Louis Muhlstock, Alexander Bercovitch, and Sam Borenstein] is similar: they paint the Montreal ghetto, tramp steamers in the harbour, street scenes, typical workers and members of the lumpen proletariat.... Muhlstock and Borenstein link their preoccupations closely with political awareness, though neither has as yet participated in the revolutionary movement." By this time, many were mentioned in the reviews of the Art Society of Montreal, while the Annual YM-YWHA art exhibition drew favorable reviews in the English press. Respected as innovators in subject matter or form, by 1948 artists Beder, Bercovitch, Borenstein, Heimlich, Mayervitch, Muhlstock, Neumann, and Reinblatt had all exhibited at the Royal Canadian Academy of Art exhibitions.

=== 1950–1999 ===
In 1959 these artists were featured at the Montreal Museum of Fine Art's exhibition Works by Canadian Jewish Artists. Interest in the art of the 30s and 40s was renewed in the mid-70s with the publication of Barry Lord's Canadian Art: Towards a People's History and with the National Gallery of Canada's traveling exhibition Canadian Painting in the Thirties. While both featured work by Bercovitch, Muhlstock and Goldberg, only Lord included the younger Jewish Painters of Montreal. However, in 1987 Montreal art historian and curator Esther Trépanier organized an exhibition of their collective work at the Saidye Bronfman Centre (Montreal) which toured Quebec, Ontario, Saskatchewan and Alberta and published Jewish Artists and Modernity. This renewed attention led to the acquisition of over 150 of their works by public institutions including the National Gallery of Canada, The Canadian War Museum, Library and Archives Canada and the Musée national des beaux-arts du Québec.

=== 2000–present ===
In 2009, Esther Trépanier, as executive director of the Musée national des beaux-arts du Québec organized the touring exhibition Jewish Painters of Montreal. Witnesses of Their Time 1930-1948. When exhibited in Montreal in 2010 at the McCord Museum of Canadian History and the Leonard and Bina Ellen Gallery, Concordia University, the exhibition drew favorable reviews. They are also exhibited frequently at West End Gallery. As individual artists Briansky exhibited in the United Nations and at the National Gallery of Canada, Caiserman (after 1964 Caiserman-Roth), an elected member of the RCA was a recipient of the Governor General's Award for the visual arts in 2004. A solo exhibition of Caiserman's work was held at the Ottawa Art Gallery in 2008, while a solo retrospective of Borenstein's work was exhibited at the Montreal Museum of Fine Arts and the University of Toronto in 2005 and at Yeshiva University in New York City in 2011.

== Contribution ==
As social realists, the Jewish Painters of Montreal combined streetscapes and figurative art with leftist ideals of social justice and worker solidarity. In 1936 Toronto critic Graham McInnis of Saturday Night wrote: "Mr. Muhlstock... is one of the leaders of that small group of Montreal painters who have found that it is possible to paint one's immediate environment – to see forms and relationships from one's back window – and at the same time to paint well, and in a manner as fine and as native in this country as the most gnarled and twisted pine of the most jagged rock in the North Country." For art historian Esther Trépanier, these artists of the 30s and 40s "unequivocally produced works that, both in their formal exploration and in their more contemporary, urban subjects, contributed towards the definition of the particular form of modernity that emerged between the major nationalist movements and abstraction" of Les Automatistes painters Paul-Émile Borduas and Jean-Paul Riopelle. For her, these Jewish artists offered a decidedly more 'international' way of looking at the Canadian scene'." which, unlike their American and Mexican contemporaries, they adopted to distance themselves from the perceived nationalism of the Group of Seven. In terms of contribution, Trépanier has concluded that:

"The artists of the Jewish community not only helped to define cultural modernity in Quebec and the rest of Canada during the interwar period, but have continued to enrich and enhance the originality of its development ever since."

Many were also respected educators. Berkovitch is considered "the father of modern Jewish painting in Montreal", and his assistant, Reinblatt, continued to teach throughout his career. Pinsky established the fine art department at Sir George Williams (now Concordia) University where both he and Caisserman taught. Briansky taught the Visual Art Centre and the Saidye Bronfman School of Fine Art in Montreal.

== Selected works in public collections ==
=== Political art ===
- Alexandre Bercovitch, Petroushka (c. 1948)
- Harry Mayerovitch, Nurse writing a letter for a soldier in a hospital bed (c. 1940), The Balkan Powder Keg (1944), Coal Face, Canada (1943), War Birds (1943)
- Louis Muhlstock, Paranka (1932), William O'Brien Unemployed (c. 1935), Open Door of Third House, Grubert Lane, Montreal (c. 1939), Welder (1943)
- Ernst Neumann, The Beggar (1931), Unemployed No. 1 (1931), Sawdust cart (1944)
- Moses Reinblatt,Weighing down the tail, New Brunswick (1945)

=== Montreal portraits and scenes ===
- Jack Beder, Painting Autumn Light, Redpath Avenue (1939), Boats at Harbour, Montreal (1933)
- Sam Borenstein, Vitré Street (1936)], Saint Dominique Street, Montreal (1942)
- Ernst Neumann, Afternoon in the park (1947)
- Louis Muhlstock, Three Heads (c. 1939), Winter Landscape (1942)
- Ernst Neumann, The Strong Man (1931) [A. Dandurand, Champ. Weight Lifter of Canada], Portrait of Harry Shane (1939), Two men sitting on a bench
- Moses Reinblatt, Portrait of Alexander Bercovitch (1951), Woman & Skeins (1940–50), St. Joseph Blvd., Montreal (1941), St. Michael's Church, Montreal (1945)
