= Dora Wasserman =

Actress, playwright, theater director

- Born: Dora Goldfarb; June 30, 1919; Chernihiv, Ukraine
- Died: December 15, 2003 (aged 84); Montreal, Quebec, Canada
- Burial place: Baron de Hirsch Cemetery, Montreal
- Occupations: Actress, playwright, theater director
- Known for: Dora Wasserman Yiddish Theatre

Dora Wasserman CM (née Goldfarb; June 30, 1919 – December 15, 2003) was a Jewish-Canadian actress, playwright and theater director.

== Early life ==
Wasserman was born in Chernihiv, Ukraine in 1919, two years after the Russian Revolution. There she learned about and performed in live-performance theatres. She was the child of a modest Jewish family. Her father was a locksmith. After studies at the School of singing Rimsky-Korsakov of Moscow, she entered to the Jewish Theater of Moscow (the GOSET), which she graduated in 1939, after 4 years of formation with great masters, including Solomon Mikhoels.

With her diploma, Dora Wasserman left Moscow for Kiev, Ukraine, but World War II forced her to move to Kazakhstan. She made theater tours in Uzbekistan and in Tajikistan. Here she met Sam Wasserman, a Polish refugee, whom she married on March 8, 1943. Ella, their first daughter, was born in Jambul on January 19, 1944. They survived the war, but Wasserman heard nothing from her family for decades.

Sam and Dora Wasserman joined the stream of refugees moving from one transit camp to another, finally arriving in Vienna. At the Rothschild Hospital, Dora Wasserman began to perform for the refugees, creating programs and entertaining in various displaced persons camps. In 1947 their second daughter, Bryna, was born in Vienna.

== Arrival to Canada ==
The Wassermans arrived in Montreal in Canada on January 21, 1950. Intent on finding work, she began to seek a place for herself, approaching Yiddish cultural and community organizations. Her activities were many and varied from recitations in schools, singing for organizations and performing at festivals and conventions. While her connection with visiting and local writers was sustained in weekly literary evenings, she also began to hold children's theater workshops at the Jewish Public Library of Montreal. Wasserman taught Yiddish's lessons and introduced young Montreal Jews to the Yiddish Theater. The group of gifted youngsters whom she gathered around her eventually grew into the backbone of her adult company, to which she attracted performers to form the Yiddish Drama Group in 1956. She was recorded by folklorist Ruth Rubin.

== Montreal Yiddish Theatre ==
In 1958, she founded of what is today called Montreal's Dora Wasserman Yiddish Theatre. With the support of the comedian Gratien Gélinas, she succeeded in producing Yiddish shows with amateur adults and children. Between 1958 and 1963, Wasserman mounted many productions, including Hanna Szenes by Aharon Megged, The Lottery by Sholem Aleichem and Sholem Asch's Kiddush Hashem and Uncle Moses. By 1964, when Yiddish theater, both amateur and professional, was disappearing the world over, Wasserman determined that her group needed to grow not only in scope of repertoire but in the establishment of a permanent venue. In 1967 the newly opened Saidye Bronfman Centre for the Arts became a permanent home for the Yiddish Theater. In 1968 a collaboration began between Wasserman and the composer Eli Rubinstein which made possible the dynamic, large-scale musical comedies that challenged her group and elicited enthusiastic response from audiences and critics alike. In 1969, she was awarded the J. I. Segal Prize "for her outstanding contribution to the Jewish cultural life of Montreal."

Between 1974 and 1988 Wasserman worked with Isaac Bashevis Singer, adapting six of his works for her company, among them In My Father's Court (1974), Yentl (1979), Gimpel The Fool (1982) and The Ball (based on The Gentleman from Frampol) (1988). In 1992 the Yiddish version of Les Belles Soeurs by Michel Tremblay, received a dynamic staging, furthering ties with Montreal's French people.

In 1992 Dora Wasserman was awarded the highest honor bestowed on civilians by the Canadian government: The Order of Canada. She made many Yiddish classics and translated authors contemporary as Michel Tremblay. In 1996, after a stroke, she officially handed direction of the Montreal Yiddish Theater to her daughter Bryna.

Dora Wasserman died on December 15, 2003, in Montreal, aged 84.

Although Wasserman did not live to see it, her daughters Ella (who lives in Israel) and Bryna (who lives in Montreal) helped celebrate the 50th anniversary of their mother's eponymous accomplishment.

== Book ==
- (in French) Jean-Marc Larrue. "Le théâtre yiddish à Montréal" Éditions Jeu, 1996.
