= Ghitta Caiserman-Roth =

Canadian painter and printmaker

- Born: March 2, 1923; Montreal, Quebec, Canada
- Died: November 25, 2005 (aged 82)
- Known for: Painting, Printmaking
- Spouses: Alfred Pinsky (m. 1945, divorced) Max Roth (m. 1962)
- Children: Kathe Pinsky (age 18 changed to Roth)

Ghitta Caiserman-Roth (March 2, 1923 – November 25, 2005) was a Canadian painter and printmaker. She was a founder of the Montreal Artist School and her work is in the National Gallery of Canada. Caiserman-Roth was also an associate member of the Royal Canadian Academy and the first painter to receive the Governor General's Award for Visual Media and Art.

== Early life and education ==
Ghitta Caiserman-Roth was born in Montreal, Quebec in 1923 to a Romanian-Jewish family. Her parents were Sarah Wittal, the founder of a children's wear company called Goosey Gander, and Hananiah Meir Caiserman, a civic leader in the Montreal Jewish community and a union organizer and activist. Both parents were heavily involved in socialist causes which had a significant impact on Ghitta's art.

Caiserman-Roth attended the High School of Montreal, the École des beaux-arts de Montréal, and finally from 1940 to 1943 the Parsons School of Design in New York City. During that time in New York, she also studied at the American Artists School, at the Art Students League, and with realist painter Moses Soyer. She studied with Albert Dumouchel in graphics under a Canada Council Senior Fellowship at the École des Beaux-Arts in Montreal in 1961 to 1962. She had a special fondness for Dumouchel and praised his welcoming demeanor and his acknowledgment of individual expression.

== Career ==
Caiserman-Roth returned to Montreal in 1947 and opened the Montreal Artists School with her first husband, Alfred Pinsky. They opened the school with artists Barbara Eckhart and Harold Goodwin. Many of the students were war veterans and Caiserman-Roth served as the principal. However, the school only ran until 1952 and was then sold. During a 1948 trip to Mexico, she encountered the socialist mural movement, after which she started to incorporate mural forms along with socialist themes into her work. Caiserman-Roth studied political murals as they explored Mexico bringing fresh ideas back to the McGill Ghetto where they lived until 1956.

Caiserman-Roth recalls that her first major sale was to A.Y. Jackson; her first major public gallery sale was of her painting entitled Backyard, which she sold to the Vancouver Art Gallery in 1949. She continued successfully as a practicing artist, receiving numerous awards and memberships, and having her work featured in solo and group exhibitions. She has been represented in over 100 collections, both public and private.

Although the Montreal Artists School was closed, Caiserman-Roth remained devoted to education. She held teaching and lecturing positions at Sir George Williams College and Concordia University, as it was called later. She also taught at the Saidye Bronfman Centre, Queen's University and Mount Allison University, the Nova Scotia College of Art, Mount St. Vincent University, Arts Sutton, the Ontario College of Art, Vermont Studio, John Abbott College, Ottawa School of Art, and others. She also served as a critic for the Canadian Broadcasting Corporation, offered critiques to individual artists and education groups, and gave numerous lectures in Canada and the United States. She has been recognized as a significant mentor for artists in Quebec and across Canada.

== Influences ==
Caiserman-Roth’s father, Hananiah, ran a salon out of their family home in Montreal and this was where her earliest influences began. Artists and writers would gather there to discuss social and political change. Her father reviewed art exhibitions and exposed her to many Montreal artist and writers. One of the most memorable to Caiserman-Roth was "Yud-Yud" Segal who introduced her to Marcel Proust and Romain Rolland. Not only was she heavily influenced by literature but by the painter Louis Muhlstock after his return from artistic study in France. They would take many walks together and she learned the difference between "seeing" and merely "looking at". Muhlstock was incredibly sensitive to his environment and this had a large influence on Caiserman. Later on she attributed her free-range imagination and varying degrees of abstraction to Muhlstock.

Her early childhood experiences play heavily into the relationships depicted in her paintings, especially between mother and child. Her mother, Sarah Caiserman, expressed her love of art by designing clothing for her children. Caiserman-Roth recalls sitting in piles of her mother's fabric enchanted by the colours, textures and patterns. This experience was heavily drawn upon when she painted First Steps (1956), depicting her own daughter.

Her first formal influence was her art teacher, Alexander Bercovitch, who taught her through private lessons at her family home in Montreal in 1932. While painting under his tutelage, at the age of eleven, Caiserman-Roth received an Honourable Mention at the Art Association of Montreal Spring Exhibition. Bercovitch was the epitome of bohemian and she recalls his "bulging blue eyes" with fondness. He heavily inspired her work with pastels and she was deeply moved by his dedication to the craft. Bercovitch also had an incredibly fondness for New York City, where Caiserman-Roth aspired to move.

While studying at the Art Students League in New York, Caiserman-Roth started learning printmaking from Harry Sternberg. Sternberg aimed to communicating social messages through art, specifically through printmaking. According to Caiserman-Roth, he showed his students the works of Goya, Daumier, Posada, and the revolution-focused works of Rivera, Siqueiros, and Orozco as exemplars. Caiserman-Roth described her exposure to their socialist art as "eye-opening" given her middle-class background.

She also learned about technique, both conventional and unconventional, from working with Jennifer Dickson at Montreal's Saidye Bronfman Centre from the late 1960s to 1970s. From Dickson, she gained an understanding of the unique medium of etching. Caiserman-Roth stated that the year and a half in Dickson's class was "exciting and developmental."

She was also influenced by her experiences working in war factories in Montreal and Halifax. By young adulthood much of her art was influenced by her experiences working in war factories in Montréal and Halifax, her work embraced the working class life and explored socialist themes.

== Sources of inspiration ==
Based on her education and influences, Caiserman-Roth established herself as a figurative artist concerned with the human condition and worked through various media: painting, lithography (printmaking), etching, and drawing. She highly valued symbolism and the combination of conventional materials and techniques with unconventional ones.

In the early 2000s, she expressed concern for the domination of monetized private studios and their potential corruption of conventional methods of printing, especially with the introduction of photography into printmaking. Ultimately, she upheld printmaking as a combination of form and content and acknowledges that new techniques are necessary:

"We look for a fusion of how it is done with what it says. The tradition of printmaking going back to Rembrandt and remembering Hayter is a rich brew of past and present. However, rules are made to be broken, because this is how we push the frontiers out further ... through deeper self knokwledge and the occasional breakthrough into new forms and ways of doing things."

Caiserman-Roth has given various artist's statements to attribute her artistic inspiration from a multitude of broad and personal sources: her perceptions, visual observations, memories, dreams, imagination, and her experimental impulse; politics, psychoanalysis, and family; her techniques, reading, music, and most consistently, nature. She transforms the starting material through synthesis, symbolism, and a fusion of form and theme. She notably said,

"My art comes from the 'vocabulary of art.' My personal motto is: 'With shape and a line and some colour I can go far.' I love to play with vocabulary and meaning."

== Movement ==
Ghitta Caiserman-Roth was part of the Jewish Painters of Montreal. The group was an artist collective that depicted expressionistic images of social realism during the 1930s and 1940s. Modern Canadian painting was defined by this generation that drew its inspiration from rise of socialism, the great depression and the effects of war. The painters were heavily influenced by the social effects of fascism and the struggle of the working class. The style was later referred to as Social Realism; a term popularized in the 1980s by art historian Esther Trepanier.

Caiserman-Roth was part of the Young Women's Hebrew Association (YWHA), along with other female artists Rita Briansky and Sylvia Ary and it was from the annual art exhibition of the YWHA and Young Men's Hebrew Association that the Jewish Painters of Montreal group was born.

== Solo exhibitions ==
- Gallery Linda Verge, Quebec City, Quebec (2001)
- Retrospective, Ottawa, Ontario (2001)
- Maison Louis H. Lafontaine, Montreal, Quebec (2001)
- Linda Lando Gallery, Vancouver, British Columbia (2000)
- Maison des Arts de Laval, Laval, Quebec (2000)
- Gallery Eclectica, Kingston, Ontario (1998)
- Galerie Jean-Claude Bergeron, Montreal, Quebec, (2000, 1997)
- Herzl Family Practice Centre (1994)
- Galerie quartier des arts, Pointe Claire, Québec (1993–1992)
- Galerie 007, Bochum, Germany (1992–1991)
- Ottawa School of Art, Ottawa, Ontario (1990)
- Altinian Laing, Montréal, Québec (1989)
- L'Art français, Montréal, Québec; École des hautes études commerciales, Université de Montréal, Montréal, Québec (1988)
- Restaurant Al Caretta, Montréal, Québec (1983)
- Dresden Galleries, Halifax, Nova Scotia (1982)
- Ghitta Caiserman-Roth: A Retrospective, 1947–1980. Concordia University Gallery, Montréal, Québec (1981–1982)

== Collections ==
Caiserman-Roth's work has been featured in over 100 private and public collections, including the following:

- Air Canada
- Alcan Aluminum Ltd.
- The Art Bank, Ottawa
- Bank Leumi, Israel, Montreal
- Canada Council for the Arts
- Confederation Centre Art Gallery, Charlottetown
- Department of External Affairs, Ottawa
- O.J. Firestone Collection, Ontario Heritage Foundation
- Jewish Public Library (Montreal)
- Lethbridge Community College, Alberta
- Montreal Museum of Fine Arts
- Musée national des beaux-arts du Québec
- National Gallery of Canada
- Ontario Department of Education
- Ottawa City Hall
- Pratt & Whitney, Montreal
- Rare Book Department, McGill University
- University of British Columbia
- University of Western Ontario, London, Ontario

== Awards and memberships ==
Caiserman-Roth won numerous awards:

- Canada Council Senior Fellowship (1961)
- Several Hadassah Art Auction Awards
- The Canadian Centennial Medal (1967)
- Canada Council Purchase Awards
- Purchase Prize and Best Graphic Image Award at the Ontario Society of Artists (1975)
- Ninth Annual Award for the Arts, I.J. Segal Fund
- Living Nature 86 Prize
- Canada Council Explorations Grant (1987)
- The Governor General's Award (2000)

In addition to her many awards, Caiserman-Roth was also a member of several institutions and councils:

- Associate, Royal Canadian Academy of Arts
- Conseil des artistes peintres du Québec
- Conseil Québecois de l'estampe
- Atelier Circulaire
- Conseil d'Administration des Amis du Musée d'art contemporain de Montréal

== Personal life ==
Caiserman married painter Alfred Pinsky in 1945. The couple had one daughter, Kathe, in 1954 and divorced in 1959. Caiserman re-married Max Roth, a well-known Montreal-based architect, in 1962. Kathe legally changed her surname to Roth at the age of 18.

== Bibliography ==
See artist's bibliography by Artexte : http://e-artexte.ca/view/artists/Caiserman-Roth,_Ghitta.html
