= Jewish Public Library =

Jewish Public Library may refer to:

- Jewish Public Library (Montreal)
- Jewish Public Library (Toronto)
