= Moe Reinblatt =

Canadian artist (1917–1979)

- Born: Moses Reinblatt; June 20, 1917; Montreal, Quebec
- Died: August 24, 1979 (aged 62); Montreal, Quebec
- Resting place: Mount Royal Cemetery
- Spouse: Lilian Rabinovitch (m. 1943)
- Awards: Canadian Centennial Medal; C. W. Jefferys Award

Moses Reinblatt (June 20, 1917 – August 24, 1979) was a Canadian painter, printmaker, sculptor, and art teacher. He was associated with the Jewish Painters of Montreal.

== Biography ==
Moe Reinblatt was born in Montreal to Jewish parents Manya (née Dipperstein, d. 1925) and Joseph Reinblatt. His grandfather, Baruch, was an immigrant from Russian Bessarabia. Reinblatt studied art with Anne Savage at Baron Byng High School from 1932 to 1935, and under painter Alexander Bercovitch at the Montreal YM-YWHA from 1935 to 1942, working meanwhile at his father's embroidery business.

He enlisted in the Royal Canadian Air Force in April 1942. He was posted to RCAF Station Mont-Joli as an airframe mechanic, eventually rising to the rank of leading aircraftman. In August 1944 he was appointed an official war artist, and was sent to document the Canadian war effort in England.

After the War, Reinblatt studied at Art Association of Montreal's School of Fine Arts and Design with Goodridge Roberts, Gordon Webber, Jacques de Tonnancour, and Eldon Grier. After two years of study, he began teaching drawing and printmaking at the School alongside Arthur Lismer, a position he held for over twenty years. He also organized art classes at the YM-YWHA between 1946 and 1957, and taught at the Saidye Bronfman Centre for the Arts from 1967. Among his many students were Bluma Appel, Paterson Ewen, Luba Genush, Estelle Hecht, and Eudice Garmaise.

He died of cancer in Montreal on August 24, 1979.

== Work ==
Besides figurative and still life works, Reinblatt painted landscapes.

A retrospective of Reinblatt's work was exhibited at the Université du Québec à Montréal Gallery in 1990. His paintings are represented in numerous museums across Canada, including the National Gallery of Canada, the Canadian War Museum, the Musée national des beaux-arts du Québec, the Montreal Museum of Fine Arts, the McCord Museum, and the New Brunswick Museum, as well as the Bezalel Museum in Israel.

== Awards and legacy ==
Reinblatt won the Rolph-Clarke-Stone Award for the most distinguished print in the 1947 Canadian Society of Graphic Art Annual Exhibition, for his drypoint The Drinker. He won the Adrian Seguin Memorial Award for his work Girl's Head with Bow in 1958, and the C. W. Jefferys Award for his work Acrobats in 1962. He received the Canadian Centennial Medal in 1968.
