= Sylvia Lefkovitz =

Canadian artist (1924–1987)

- Lefkovitz in 1962
- Born: August 29, 1924; Montreal, Quebec, Canada
- Died: April 21, 1987 (aged 62); Montreal, Quebec, Canada
- Resting place: Baron de Hirsch Cemetery
- Known for: Painter and sculptor

Sylvia Lefkovitz (August 29, 1924 – April 21, 1987) was a Canadian artist known for her murals, oils, drawings, lithos and sculptures rendered in bronze, silver, marble, and Canadian wood. Her work has been exhibited all over the world and was profiled in the National Film Board of Canada's 1966 documentary In Search of Medea: The Art of Sylvia Lefkovitz.

Among her major pieces are the five-figure bronze Chorus, commissioned for the Mies van der Rohe complex in Montreal's Westmount Square; her Fathers of Confederation, commemorating the 1967 Canadian Centennial; her eighty-figure Divine Comedy, purchased by the Canadian government and exhibited in the Dante Room of the Royal Palace in Milan on the occasion of Dante's 700th birthday; and her eight bronze biblical panels in bas-relief, inspired by Ghiberti's Bronze Doors on the Florence Baptistery.

== Biography ==
Sylvia Lefkovitz was born in Montreal, Quebec, to immigrant parents of Russian and Hungarian Jewish descent. Lefkovitz first displayed a talent for drawing in elementary school, and by the seventh grade was already sketching portraits. She went on to attend Baron Byng High School where art teacher Anne Savage encouraged her to pursue her artistic ambitions. Supported by her working-class parents, she embarked on a lifetime of study by taking classes at the École des beaux-arts de Montréal.

After graduating high school, Lefkovitz began art studies at Columbia University in New York in 1941. She returned to Montreal a year later, working nights during the Second World War at Fairchild Aircraft while her days were spent studying at the Montreal Museum of Fine Arts School. On scholarship at the school for drawing, she studied under Eldon Grier until 1946, when she returned to Columbia University for two more years. While studying there under Oronzio Maldarelli and Henry Meloy, she supported herself by again working nights as a keypunch operator for the Blue Cross.

After a brief return to Montreal, Lefkovitz decided to continue her studies at the Louvre and Académie Julian in Paris. A year later, she moved on to Spain and Italy for a time before returning to Montreal, where she took a bookkeeping day job, taught art in the evenings, and "painted like mad." She began experimenting in the ancient art form of encaustic painting, and in 1953, several of these works were exhibited in Montreal.

Lefkovitz spent four months in Mexico in 1954, studying Orozco's mural techniques and observing the creation of major historical murals in the Pyroxylin medium (a lacquer technique). The Mexican muralists' depiction of oppressed peoples and social injustice inspired her to apply their techniques to the interpretation of these issues in her own country. Upon her return to Montreal, she received a commission from the Redpath Museum to create a series of murals depicting the life and career of Louis Riel. The work won Lefkovitz her first major professional recognition. The Riel mural was exhibited as part of the formal opening of the park on St. Helen's Island in Montreal by invitation of the Municipal Government. The panels were later purchased by the Department of Northern Affairs and National Resources and are on display in the National Historic Park in North Battleford, Saskatchewan. The following year, a second series of historical panels depicting the expulsion of the Acadians was exhibited in Gallery XII in the Montreal Museum of Fine Arts. Those five panels, which run 60 feet in length and are six feet high, are now housed at the Université Sainte-Anne.

In 1958, Lefkovitz was awarded an Arts Teachers Fellowship by the Canada Council to return to Mexico for a year, allowing her to devote all her time and attention to art for the first time. In Mexico City, she experimented with different lacquers under Professor José L. Gutiérrez at the Instituto Politécnico Nacional, and further mastered her mural technique. She also encountered the renowned painter David Alfaro Siqueiros, and they made plans to collaborate on a mural (it is unclear as to whether this work ever materialized).

In 1959, Lefkovitz returned to her bookkeeping job in Montreal, painting in whatever spare time she had. By 1960, she had saved enough money to travel again, and headed to Italy; it was there that her focus shifted to sculpture. In the marble studios of Florence, she took an apprenticeship in carving, and in the city's ceramic factories, she learned the art of terra cotta. Working in the foundries, she rapidly mastered the technique of lost-wax casting. In 1962, she was awarded the Porcellino Award as the best resident foreign artist. She returned home later that year, fluent in Italian and accompanied by nine crates of her painting and sculpture. The Waddington Galleries in Montreal mounted a solo exhibit of her artwork. She used this homecoming to begin sculpting with Canadian wood. She travelled again in 1963, in Greece and Rome, finally settling in Milan, where she had her first major Italian solo exhibit at the Galleria Montenapoleone. The show won critical acclaim, and she was lauded for her interpretation of the Italian Renaissance tradition in both her painting and sculpture.

Lefkovitz remained in Milan for the better part of seventeen years, living and working on a student visa. The almost two-decade period was one of significant professional success, with a string of exhibitions, retrospectives, and awards. She also won major public and private commissions in both Europe and Canada, including The Chorus, Fathers of Confederation and the Divine Comedy. She returned to Montreal in 1981, where she worked and taught from both her Montreal studio (Studio 3) and at the Saidye Bronfman Centre School of Fine Arts until her death in 1987 at the age of 62.

== Selected exhibitions ==
- 2018 – The Hand and the Fire: The Life and Work of Sylvia Lefkovitz, Gallery Gevik, Toronto, Canada
- 2011 – Sylvia Lefkovitz: A Retrospective, Gallery Gevik, Toronto, Canada
- 2006 – Between Montreal, Mexico & Milan: Sculptures and paintings by Sylvia Lefkovitz, Valentin Gallery, Montreal, Canada
- 1975 – Retrospective, Fiat Company, Cultural Centre, Turin, Italy
- 1971 – The National Gallery of Canada, Ottawa, Canada
- 1969 – Sculpture, Canada House, London, England
- 1967 – Sculpture, Confederation Train and Caravans, Canada
- 1965 – Paintings, Palazzo Venezia, Rome, Italy
- 1962 – Paintings and sculpture, Palagio di Parte Guelfa, Florence, Italy
- 1957 – Paintings and murals, Montreal Museum of Fine Arts, Canada

== Selected collections ==
- Montreal Museum of Fine Arts, QC
- Musée Louis-Hémon de Péribonka, QC
- New Brunswick Museum, Saint John, NB
- Redpath Museum, McGill University, QC
- Batoche Historical Museum, SK
- Université Sainte-Anne, Pointe-de-l'Église, NS
- Musée d'art de Joliette, QC

== Major awards ==
- Premio Nazionale Grafica San Michele d'Oro, Italy, 1973
- Premio Nazionale di pittura figurative, Italy, 1973
- Premio Nazionale Grafica San Michele d'Oro, Italy, 1972
- Presented with the City of Genoa Shield for high artistic merit, Italy, 1972
- Premio Nazionale di pittura – Il Morazzone, Italy, 1971
- Porcellino award for the best resident foreign artist, Italy, 1962
