= Herman Heimlich =

Hungarian-born Canadian painter (1904–1986)

- Born: June 18, 1904; Kingdom of Hungary
- Died: November 6, 1986 (aged 82); Montreal, Quebec, Canada
- Resting place: Baron de Hirsch Cemetery
- Education: Royal Academy of Fine Arts, Budapest
- Spouse: Mary Steinberg (m. 1937)

Herman Heimlich (June 18, 1904 – November 6, 1986) was a Hungarian-born Canadian painter. He was associated with the Jewish Painters of Montreal.

== Biography ==
Herman Heimlich was born in 1904 in Hungary. His father, a rabbi, emigrated to New York in 1915. Heimlich travelled extensively after studying at the Royal Academy of Fine Arts in Budapest, and spent a year with his father in the United States in the 1920s, during which time he painted a series of murals at the Cotton Club.

Heimlich settled permanently in Montreal around 1930, and set up his first studio above the Jewish Public Library. That same year, he participated in his first Canadian exhibition, winning first prize. He continued to participate in exhibitions throughout the 1930s and 1940s, most notably those organized in 1937 and 1938 by the Art Association of Montreal, the forerunner of the Montreal Museum of Fine Arts.

While Heimlich drew and painted landscapes and still lifes, he favoured portraiture. He also created murals for public and private buildings in Canada and the United States, and produced illustrations for children's books.

He taught at various institutions in Montreal, including the Fine Arts Department of the Saidye Bronfman Centre. Among his students were Esther Wertheimer, Peter Whalley, Brodie Shearer, Sarah Valerie Gersovitz, and Viateur Lapierre.

== Work ==
Heimlich's artwork is represented in a number of Canadian museum collections, including the Musée national des beaux-arts du Québec, Museum London, the Dalhousie Art Gallery, and the Art Gallery of Ontario.
