= Hyman's Book and Art Shoppe =

Book store in Toronto, Canada

Coordinates: 43.65617°N 79.39963°W

Hyman's Book and Art Shoppe, 1926–1971, was widely known in the Jewish community as Hyman's Bookstore. It was an important part of the early history of Spadina Avenue in Toronto, as well as the early Jewish community of Toronto. The store was founded in 1926 by Ben Zion Hyman and his wife Fannie (also known as Faygle). For most of its 45-year history, Hyman's Bookstore was located at 412 Spadina Avenue in Toronto, Ontario, Canada.

The book store specialized in Jewish books of both secular and religious interest in English, Yiddish and Hebrew. Hyman's Bookstore carried a complete line of Jewish ritual objects such as talleisim, tfillin, kiddush cups, menorahs, shabbath candlesticks, kippot and jewelry (e.g., mezuzahs and magen davids). It was also the main supplier of all the Jewish schools in Toronto. In 1941, Hyman used books from the store to found the Toronto Jewish Public Library.

Hyman's Bookstore started a book registry in the late 1940s, so that there would be no duplication in Bar Mitvah gifts. Another one of Hyman's specialties was office supplies. In addition, the business was renowned for its Jewish greeting cards sold during major Jewish holidays. Many Jewish landsmanshaften [organizations of people from the same European area] depended on Hyman's service for mimeographing multiple copies of local community society newsletters and minutes.

The store gained its fame as a meeting place of Jewish political ideas and viewpoints. It was often referred to as the "Jewish Parliament." Many heated conversations took place in the store, over bottles of Coca-Cola. They discussed viewpoints such as Labour Zionism, Mizrachi, Revisionism, and so on.

All points of view were welcomed except for Communism. Many people came to the bookstore to have letters written in Fanny Hyman's handwriting (in English, Polish or Yiddish) to be sent home to their families in eastern Europe.

"Hyman's Book and Art Shoppe" was the name of the store from 1926 to 1953. "Hyman and Son" was the name of the store from 1953 to its closing in 1971.

A northern branch was opened at 1032 Eglinton Avenue West (near Bathurst Street). It was owned and managed by Ruth Warner and Gurion Hyman from 1953 to 1962.
