= Rita Briansky =

Canadian painter (1925–2025)

- Born: 25 July 1925; Grajewo, Poland
- Died: 24 April 2025 (aged 99); Montreal, Quebec, Canada
- Resting place: Baron de Hirsch Cemetery, Montreal
- Known for: Painter, teacher
- Spouse: Joseph Prezament

Rita Briansky (25 July 1925 – 24 April 2025) was a Polish-born Canadian painter and printmaker. Briansky was associated with the Jewish Painters of Montreal.

== Early life ==
Briansky was born in Grajewo, Poland on 25 July 1925. She emigrated to Ontario, Canada with her mother and two sisters in 1929. The year they arrived, the family moved to Ansonville in northern Ontario, then Val d'Or, Quebec in 1939, and then to Montreal in 1941. She studied with Alexander Bercovitch at the Y.W.H.A. (1941–1942); the Montreal Museum of Fine Arts with Jacques de Tonnancour (1942–1944); the Montreal School of Fine Arts with M. Carpentier (1944–1946); and the Art Students League, New York with Jan Carbino, Louis Bosa, H. Sternberg and Vaclav Vytlacil (1946–1948) in New York City.

== Career ==
Briansky had a wide range of work: paintings, drawings, watercolours, pastels and prints. She held solo shows at the Montreal Museum of Fine Arts (1957, 1962); and the Glenhyrst Arts Council, Brantford, Ontario (1965) (now the Glenhyrst Art Gallery of Brant) as well as many commercial galleries. Her group shows have included the Second International Biennial Exhibition of Prints, Tokyo and Osaka, Japan (1960–1961) and the United Nations, N.Y. (1965). In 1995, following travels in Poland to her birthplace and memorial sites, Briansky created the Kaddish Series, reflecting on the tragedy of the Holocaust. This series (the Jewish Prayer for the Dead) is on permanent display at the Jewish General Hospital in Montreal.

Her work is included in the collections of the National Gallery of Canada, the Musée national des beaux-arts du Québec, the Art Gallery of Hamilton, the Burnaby Art Gallery the Cape Breton University Art Gallery, the Winnipeg Art Gallery, the Vancouver Art Gallery, and many others. She also illustrated an anthology of children's short stories for the Gage Publishing Company called Rubaboo 4.

Briansky was a member of the Canadian Painter-Etchers and Engravers Society, and the Canadian Society of Graphic Art. A full-length feature film The Wonder and Amazement - Rita Briansky on Her Life in Art was made by Janet Best and Dov Okouneff on her life and art in 2018.

For more than 45 years, she worked as a teacher, both of art history and studio art.

== Personal life and death ==
Briansky was married to fellow artist Joseph Prezament. Briansky died on 24 April 2025, at the age of 99.
