= "Honorary Protestants" =

2015 book by David Fraser

Honorary Protestants": The Jewish School Question in Montreal, 1867-1997
- Author: David Fraser
- Language: English
- Publication date: 2015

"Honorary Protestants": The Jewish School Question in Montreal, 1867-1997 is a 2015 non-fiction book by David Fraser, published by University of Toronto Press. It is about the ways Jewish residents of Montreal negotiated the K-12 educational environment in the city; in the time period scope of the book, public schools were either Catholic or Protestant and divided into school districts along those lines instead of along linguistic lines.

The title originates from a statement in A Meeting of the People: School Boards and Protestant Communities in Quebec, 1801-1998 about how Jewish K-12 students typically attended Protestant schools by custom.

== Background ==
David Fraser works for the University of Nottingham as a professor, with his field being law and social theory.

== Content ==
The book has fourteen chapters:

1. Introduction: Constituting Law, Constituting Justice in the Jewish School Question
2. Invoking Equality, Invoking Legality: Jews Constituting Their Canadian Identity
3. Schools, Taxes, Jews, Catholics (and Protestants): The Origins of the Jewish School Question
4. Jews and Roman Catholics, School Taxes and Protestants: The First Jewish School Question
5. Taxes, the Rabbi, and the Schoolboy: Section 93 and the Pinsler Case
6. Promises, Promises: “Honorary Protestants” in Protestant Schools
7. Jews, Protestants, and Taxes (Again): The Jewish School Question in the 1920s
8. Jews, Protestants, Roman Catholics, and the Law: The Jewish School Question Goes to Court
9. Jews, Protestants, and Roman Catholics: Two Crises and the Jewish School Question, 1928–1931
10. The Protestant Jews of Ste Sophie and La Macaza: Constituting School and Community in Rural Quebec
11. Outremont and Beyond: The Jewish School Question Moves West
12. Hampstead and Beyond: From the Ghetto to Citizenship and Equality under Law’s Shadow
13. TMR, St Laurent, Côte Saint-Luc: Democracy, Law, and the End of the Jewish School Question
14. Constituting Canada and the Jewish School Question in Montreal, fin

The book has information on Jewish Canadians trying to get rights to for education and representation on boards of trustees of school districts.

== Reception ==
Jory Binder, a Juris Doctor candidate of Osgoode Hall Law School, wrote that the "contextual stance on the rule of law" is the primary "contribution" of the work, and that the historical developments are "skilfully" explained.

Anthony Di Masco of Bishop's University described the book as "a valuable new contribution to" its field.

David S. Koffman of York University wrote that of what the book covers, the "scholarship is meticulous and unassailable"; Koffman stated that he wished that the book covered some other related aspects.

Roderick MacLeod, who co-wrote A Meeting of the People, argued that "Honorary Protestants" has "the lack of a sense of human agency" - that is, not showing how individuals felt/acted, as its "real shortcoming", and MacLeod also criticized "errors and confusing passages". MacLeod did not like how he perceived the use of the title "Honorary Protestants" as being "sarcastically" done.

== See also ==
- History of the Jews in Montreal
