= Baron Byng High School =

Location
- 4251 St. Urbain Street; Montreal, Quebec, Canada H2W 1V6; 45.517403°N 73.583744°W

Information
- Type: Public school
- Motto: Latin: Constants et fidelis
- Established: 1921
- Closed: 22 June 1980 (46 years ago)
- School board: Protestant School Board of Montreal
- Language: English
- Colours: Orange, black and blue
- Song: Echoes of Byng
- Yearbook: Echo
- Website: baronbynghighschool.ca

Baron Byng High School was an English-language public high school on Saint Urbain Street in Montreal, Quebec, opened by Governor General of Canada Julian Byng, 1st Viscount Byng of Vimy in 1921. The school was attended largely by working-class Jewish Montrealers from its establishment until the 1960s. Baron Byng High School's alumni include many accomplished academics, artists, businesspeople and politicians.

Baron Byng has been immortalized in many books, including in Mordecai Richler's The Apprenticeship of Duddy Kravitz, St. Urbain's Horseman, and Joshua Then and Now as Fletcher's Field High School.

== History ==
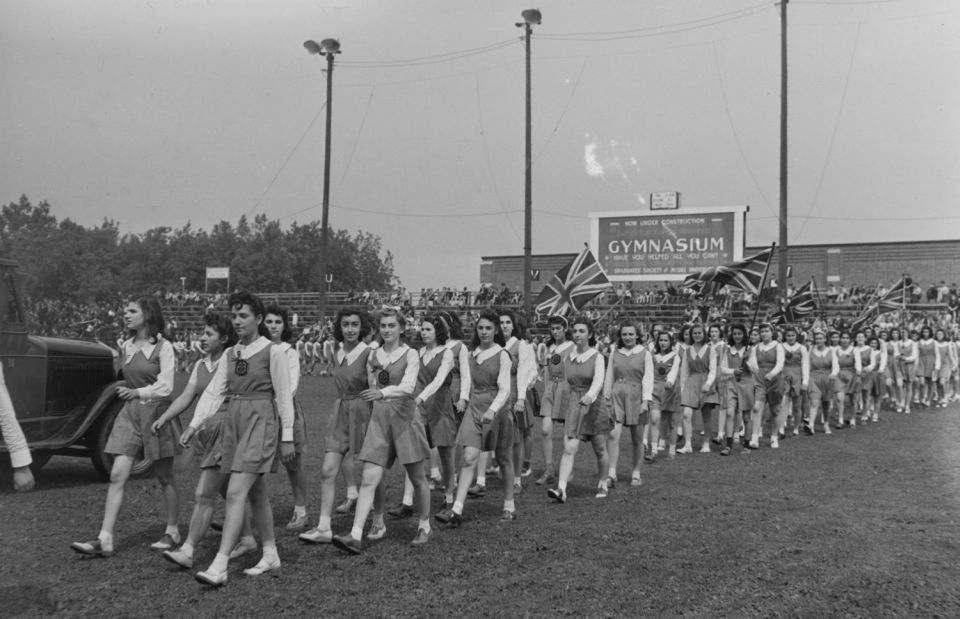
Baron Byng students take part in a victory parade in 1941.

At the beginning of the 20th century, Quebec's confessional school system prohibited Jews from attending French-language Catholic schools, relegating them to Protestant schools. By 1916, Jews made up 44% of the total enrolment in Montreal's English-language Protestant schools. Jewish participation, however, was forbidden on school committees and at the Protestant School Board, and Jewish teachers were discriminated against in terms of employment opportunities. Throughout the period of mass Jewish migration to Montreal, the Board enforced a policy of segregation in its schools.

Built by the Protestant School Board in 1921, Baron Byng High School was named in honour of Julian Byng, Governor General of Canada from 1921 to 1926 and a distinguished World War I soldier. The school was designed by Montreal architect John Smith Archibald. The population of Baron Byng was consciously constructed to be Jewish by the Board, which sought to segregate Jews to avoid the dilution of English-Canadian culture and Protestant religious instruction taught in their public schools. From the 1920s through to the mid-1960s, the student population was largely Jewish, reaching 99 per cent by 1938, though the faculty and staff were resolutely English-Canadian.

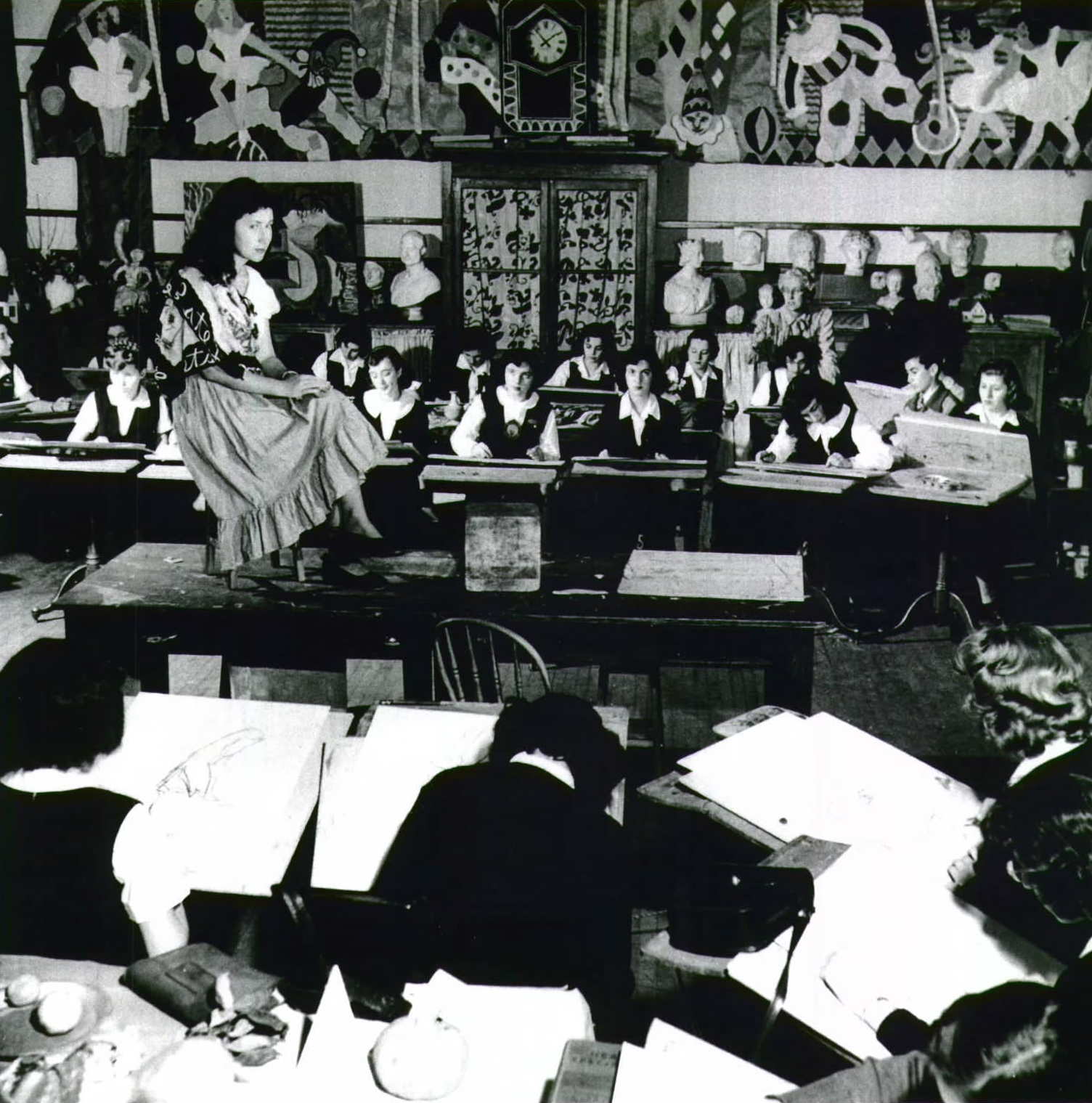
One of Anne Savage's art classes at Baron Byng in 1948.

Baron Byng's students went on strike in 1934 to protest the School Board's increase of school fees and reduction in teachers' salaries. In April 1945, Baron Byng held a commemorative service for the second anniversary of the Warsaw Ghetto Uprising, sponsored by the Canadian Jewish Congress; speakers included Baruch Zuckerman and Michael Garber.

In the 1960s, there was an influx of Moroccan Jewish students and a French section was created. By the 1970s, there were a significant number of students of Greek and other origins.

Eventually, Quebec education laws prohibited the immigrant population from attending English schools. For lack of sufficient enrolment in the school's territory and rising costs, the Protestant School Board was forced to close the school in June 1980, with Mount Royal High School designated as the official recipient school for existing BBHS students.

After the school's closure, the Baron Byng building became home of the non-profit community organization Sun Youth. However, in 2017 the Commission scolaire de Montréal, the building's owner, voted to reclaim the property for educational purposes. Sun Youth has since operated from temporary locations while seeking a permanent home. In 2025, after the Government of Quebec cancelled a planned renovation project for the F.A.C.E. School, it was announced that F.A.C.E.'s secondary students will relocate to the former Baron Byng building. The move is projected for 2032.

An online museum dedicated to Baron Byng's history was created in 2016.

== Notable people ==
=== Alumni ===
- Len Birman (1932–2023), actor
- Harry Blank (1925– ), Liberal MNA
- Myer Bloom FRSC (1928–2016), physicist
- Michael Fainstat (1923–2010), politician
- Morris Fish CC (1938– ), Supreme Court Justice
- Samuel Gesser CM (1930–2008), entertainment entrepreneur
- Alan Gold OC (1917–2005), Chief Justice of Quebec
- Phil Gold CC FRSC (1936– ), physician
- Yoine Goldstein (1934–2020), senator
- Benjamin Greenberg (1933–2019), Quebec Superior Court Justice
- Henry Gordon (1919–2009), journalist and magician
- Harold Greenberg OC (1930–1996), film producer
- Harry Gulkin (1927–2018), film and theatre producer
- Goldie Hershon (1942–2020), President of Canadian Jewish Congress
- Mel Hoppenheim (1937–2022), entrepreneur
- Maxwell Kalman (1906–2009), architect
- A. M. Klein (1909–1972), poet
- Michael Laucke (1947– ), concert guitarist
- Irving Layton OC (1912–2006), poet
- Sylvia Lefkovitz (1924–1987), painter and sculptor
- David Lewis OC (1909–1981), Rhodes Scholar (1932), Leader of the New Democratic Party (1971–75)
- Marilyn Lightstone (1940– ), actress
- Frederick Lowy OC (1933– ), medical educator and President of Concordia University
- Rudolph Marcus (1923– ), chemist; Nobel Prize in Chemistry (1992)
- Herbert Marx (1932–2020), Quebec Minister of Justice and Superior Court Justice
- Alan Mills (1912–1977), folk singer
- Dorothy Morton (1924–2008), pianist and professor of music
- Louis Nirenberg (1925–2020), mathematician; Abel Prize (2015)
- Alfred Pinsky (1921–1999), artist and art educator
- Jack Rabinovitch OC (1930–2017), founder of the Giller Prize
- Simon Reisman OC (1919–2008), Deputy Finance Minister
- Mordecai Richler CC (1931–2001), author
- Fred Rose (1907–1983), Communist MP
- Philip Seeman OC FRSC (1934–2021), schizophrenia researcher
- Reuben Ship (1917–1975), playwright and screenwriter
- Sydney Shulemson DFC (1915–2007), World War II soldier
- Tobie Steinhouse (1925– ), painter and printmaker
- Lionel Tiger (1937– ), anthropologist
- Lorne Trottier OC (1945– ), businessman
- Gerry Weiner (1933– ), Minister of Immigration
- Eli Yablonovitch (1946– ), physicist

=== Faculty ===
- Anne Savage (1896–1971), painter and art teacher
