= Heimlich (disambiguation) =

Heimlich usually refers to the Heimlich maneuver, a first aid procedure used to treat upper airway obstructions.

It may also refer to:

- Heimlich and Co., or Top Secret Spies, a spy-themed German-style board game
- 10637 Heimlich, main-belt asteroid
- Heimlich, a Bavarian caterpillar in the 1998 Pixar animated film A Bug's Life
- Chef Heimlich McMuseli, a goat chef in the animated TV series Camp Lazlo

== People with the surname ==
- Henry Heimlich (1920–2016), American surgeon and namesake for the eponymous maneuver
- Herman Heimlich (1904–1986), Hungarian-Canadian painter
- Luke Heimlich (born 1996), American baseball pitcher
- William F. Heimlich (1911–1996), American intelligence officer and head of Radio in the American Sector in Berlin from 1948–1949
- Wolfgang Heimlich (born 1917, date of death unknown), German swimmer
