= Estelle Hecht =

Jewish canadian artist and gallerist

Estelle Hecht (died in 1971) was a Jewish Canadian engraver, painter and gallerist from Montreal, Quebec. She ran the print gallery Gallery 1640 which she founded in 1961. She studied at the École des beaux-arts de Montréal and was trained by drawing professors Jacques de Tonnancour, Arthur Lismer, and Moses "Moe" Reinblatt in engraving. She died in the fire that destroyed her art gallery in 1971.
