= The Colours of My Father: A Portrait of Sam Borenstein =

1992 film

- Directed by: Joyce Borenstein
- Written by: Joyce Borenstein
- Produced by: Sally Bochner; Richard Elson
- Cinematography: David De Volpi; Pierre Landry
- Edited by: Rita Roy
- Distributed by: National Film Board of Canada
- Release date: 1992
- Running time: 29 minutes
- Country: Canada
- Language: English

The Colours of My Father: A Portrait of Sam Borenstein is a 1992 Canadian short animated documentary film directed by Joyce Borenstein.

== Summary ==
The film explores her father, the Canadian painter Sam Borenstein, using various animation techniques alongside integrating archival material, filmed sequences and the paintings themselves to reminisce friends and family and bringing his artwork to life.

== Accolades ==
It was nominated for an Academy Award for Best Documentary Short. In Canada, it was named best short documentary at the 12th Genie Awards.

== See also ==
- Ryan - 2004 Oscar-winning animated documentary short similar in content
