= History of the Jews in Montreal =

Jews in Montreal
יהודים במונטריאול
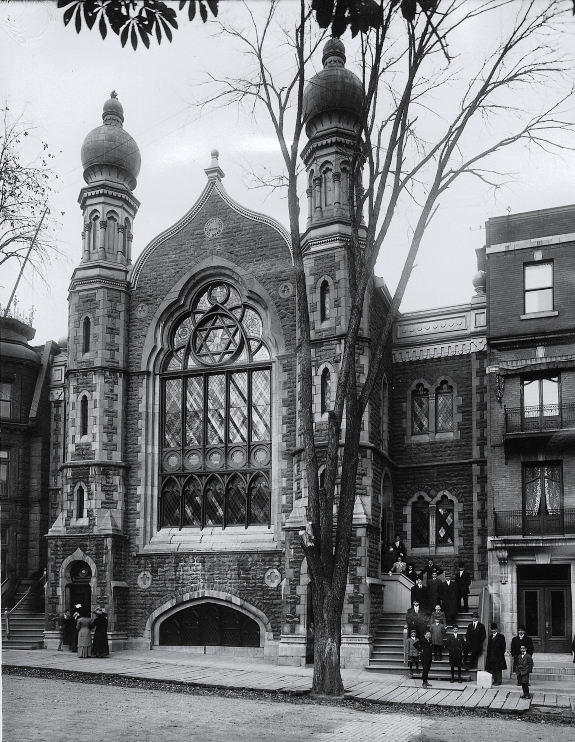
- Congregation Shaar Hashomayim, earlier synagogue building built in 1866 c. 1910-11

Total population
- 90,250 (2021)

Languages
- Canadian English, Quebec French, Hebrew, Yiddish, Modern Standard Arabic, Russian

Religion
- Orthodox Judaism, Conservative Judaism, Reform Judaism, irreligious

Related ethnic groups
- History of the Jews in Toronto • History of the Jews in Vancouver

Montreal's Jewish community is one of the oldest and most populous in Canada, formerly first but now second to Toronto and numbering more than 90,000 in Greater Montreal according to the 2021 census undertaken by Federation CJA. The community is quite diverse and is composed of many different Jewish ethnic divisions that arrived in Canada at different periods of time and under differing circumstances.

Montreal's first Jews were Sepharadi and Ashkenazi Jews who had previously settled in Britain and from there moved to Canada as far back as the 18th century. Predominant in number and cultural influence throughout much of the 20th century were the Ashkenazi Jews who arrived from Eastern Europe mostly prior to and following World War II; they settled largely along the Main and in the Mile End, a life vividly chronicled by such writers as Mordecai Richler. There is also a substantial number of French-speaking Mizrahi and Sephardi Jews, originating from former French colonies in the Middle East and North Africa. More recent arrivals include significant numbers of Russian Jews, Argentinian Jews, and French Jews as well as some Indian Jews, Ethiopian Jews and others. 22% of Montreal's Jewish population have French as their mother tongue.Yiddish is still a living part of the Montreal language mix, particularly in the substantial Hasidic community.

Demographically smaller as a result of the exodus that came with the instability provoked by the Quebec sovereignty movement, Montreal's Jewish community has nevertheless been a leading contributor to the city's cultural landscape and is renowned for its level of charitable giving and its plethora of social service community institutions. Among these are the world-renowned Jewish Public Library of Montreal, Segal Centre for Performing Arts, Dora Wasserman Yiddish Theatre, Montreal Holocaust Memorial Centre and the Museum of Jewish Montreal.

Jewish culinary contributions have also been a source of pride for Montrealers; two contributions are its smoked meat sandwiches and its distinctive style of bagels. There are many private Jewish schools in Montreal, receiving partial funding of the secular courses in their curriculum from the Quebec government (like most denominational schools in Quebec). Approximately 7,000 children attend Jewish day schools, over 50% of the total Jewish school age population, an extremely high percentage for North American cities.

The Jewish left and secular Jewish culture have flourished in Montreal, producing notable artists and public figures such as Charles Krauthammer, Mort Zuckerman, Naomi Klein, Leonard Cohen, Irving Layton and Gerald Cohen.

== History ==
Shearith Israel, a Spanish-Portuguese congregation, opened in 1768; it was the first Jewish congregation in Montreal. The grave of Lazarus David was the oldest Jewish grave in Montreal; it was dated to 1776.

There were about 6,000 Russian Jews in Montreal in 1900. Jews made up 6-7% of Montreal's population between 1911 and 1931.

In 1921, Greater Montreal had 45,802 Jews, with 93.7% of them being in the City of Montreal. In 1931, about 80% of the 60,087 Quebecers of Jewish origin lived in Montreal. In 1931, 84% of Greater Montreal's Jews lived in Montreal. Between 1921 and 1931 many Jews moved to Outremont and Westmount from Laurier and St. Louis in Montreal.

Montreal has the second largest Jewish community in Canada, and about a quarter (23.2%) of the country's Jewish population.

== Demographics and language ==
In the 19th century, most Jews from Montreal were of British Sephardic origins, and Montreal did not have a German-Jewish elite that other communities had.

Bernard Spolsky, author of The Languages of the Jews: A Sociolinguistic History, stated that "Yiddish was the dominant language of the Jewish community of Montreal". In 1931, 99.6% of Montreal Jews stated that Yiddish was their mother language. In the 1930s there was a Yiddish language education system and a Yiddish newspaper in Montreal. In 1938, most Jewish households in Montreal primarily used English and often used French and Yiddish. 9% of the Jewish households only used French and 6% only used Yiddish. From 1907 to 1977 the Keneder Adler (Odler, The Canadian Eagle), a Yiddish newspaper, was published in Montreal. The percentage of Yiddish speakers have decreased to 30.2% of the Jewish population by 1961.

In the 20th century, children in Montreal Jewish households mostly read English publications while parents read publications in French and Yiddish. In 2006, Montreal had more Yiddish speakers than Toronto.

In 1971 the Jewish community in Greater Montreal numbered 109,480. Political and economic uncertainties about potential Quebec independence led many to leave Montreal and the province of Quebec for Toronto.

The 2021 census commissioned by Federation CJA showed a Jewish population of 90,250 in the Greater Montreal area, comprising 2.1 per cent of the total population. This represented a 0.6% increase on the 2011 study, and the first increase in fifty years.

== Geography ==
In 1931, Laurier, St. Louis and St. Michel had the highest concentration of Jews living within the limits of the city of Montreal, with St. Louis having 54.8% of its population being Jewish, Laurier having 50.9% of its population being Jewish and St. Michel having 38.5% of its population being Jewish. During that year, 23.7% of the population of Outremont was Jewish and 7.3% of the population of Westmount was Jewish.

Today, the Jewish community is primarily concentrated in Côte St. Luc, Hampstead, Snowdon, and the West Island. Other major Jewish communities exist in Outremont, Park Extension, and Chomedey.

== Politics ==
In the early 20th century, Jewish representatives of the Montreal City Council, the Quebec legislature, and the Canadian parliament originated from Jewish neighbourhoods in Montreal. Jewish politicians were often elected federally in the ridings of Cartier, which exclusively elected Jewish MPs for its entire history from 1925 until it was abolished in 1966, and Mount Royal. The riding of Outremont also has a significant Jewish population. Provincially, the ridings of Montréal–Saint-Louis (later Saint-Louis) and D'Arcy-McGee often elected Jewish candidates.

== Relations with non-Jews ==
Charles Dellheim, the author of "Is It Good for the Jews? The Apprenticeship of Duddy Kravitz," wrote that Jews often faced conflict from both the Francophone and Anglophone sectors of Montreal.

== Education ==
The Montreal government granted Jews the right to choose whether to pay taxes to Protestant schools or Catholic schools, and therefore the right for their children to attend either school system, in 1870. In 1894 the Montreal Protestant School Board agreed to begin funding the Baron de Hirsch School for Jewish Immigrants in exchange for being the school board of choice for Montreal's Jews. Enrollment increased due to subsequent eastern European Jewish immigration.

In 1962, a majority of Jewish students attended Protestant schools, accounting for 25.1 percent of elementary school enrolments and 34.5 percent high school enrolments.

As of 2026, Montreal has seven non-Haredi elementary Jewish Day Schools and four Jewish high schools. These include:

- École Maïmonide, a French-language elementary and high school, with campuses in Côte Saint-Luc and Saint-Laurent.
- Jewish People's and Peretz Schools and Bialik High School in Côte Saint-Luc
- Solomon Schechter Academy, a preschool and elementary school affiliated with Conservative Judaism.
- United Talmud Torahs of Montreal and Herzliah High School, an elementary and high school in Côte-des-Neiges–Notre-Dame-de-Grâce.
- Hebrew Academy, a Modern Orthodox elementary and high school in Côte Saint-Luc.
- Hebrew Foundation School, an elementary school in Dollard-Des Ormeaux
- Akiva School, an elementary school housed within Congregation Shaar Hashomayim, in Westmount

== Notable residents ==
- Adam Gopnik
- A. M. Klein
- Ben Weider
- Bronfman family
- Charles Krauthammer
- David Lewis
- David Usher
- Dov Charney
- Efrim Menuck
- Fred Rose
- Gerald Cohen
- Henry Morgentaler
- Herbert Marx
- Hershey Friedman
- Irving Layton
- Irwin Cotler
- Jewish Painters of Montreal
- Léa Roback
- Leonard Cohen
- Mordecai Richler
- Morris Fish
- Moshe Safdie
- Naomi Klein
- Nikki Yanofsky
- Phyllis Lambert
- Régine Robin
- Reuben Schwartz
- Saul Bellow
- Steven Pinker
- William Shatner

== See also ==
- History of the Jews in Canada
- "Honorary Protestants"
