= Ben Zion Hyman =

Canadian bookseller

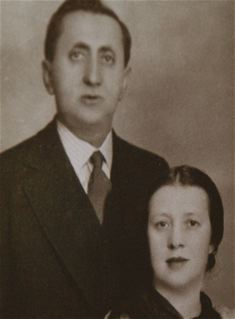
- Ben Zion and Fannie Hyman, circa 1932
- Born: October 22, 1891; Mazyr, Belarus
- Died: July 17, 1984 (aged 92); Toronto, Ontario, Canada
- Education: Odessa Polytechnical Institute, University of Toronto
- Occupations: Engineer, teacher, bookseller
- Spouse: Fannie (nee Konstantynowski)
- Children: Gurion Hyman (1925)
- Parent(s): Rev. Mendel and Bella Hyman

Ben Zion Hyman (October 22, 1891 – July 17, 1984) was a Canadian Jewish bookseller. Originally from Mazyr in what is now Belarus, Hyman graduated from the Odessa Polytechnical Institute. After coming to Canada (settling first in Guelph, Ontario), he graduated in electrical engineering from the University of Toronto. Hyman and his wife, Fannie (née Konstantynowski), (in Polish, Fela; in Yiddish, Faigel), opened Jewish Toronto's most prominent book store, Hyman's Book and Art Shoppe (later known as Hyman's Booksellers, and still later known as Hyman & Son) at 412 Spadina Avenue in 1926. In 1953, his son Gurion Hyman opened a branch at 1032 Eglinton Avenue West in the Cedarvale/Forest Hill area of Toronto. Hyman closed the store in the early 1970s after the death of his wife.

During his life, Hyman was active as a member, founder and/or president of a number of organizations. These included: Hadassah, JIAS, Toronto Zionist Council, Toronto JNF, Keren Hatarbut, Poale Zion, and Farband. Hyman was an elected delegate to the first Canadian Jewish Congress in 1919. He also founded the Toronto Jewish Public Library in 1941.
