= Enid Legros-Wise =

Canadian artist (born 1943)

- Born: 1943; Gaspé, Quebec
- Known for: ceramic artist

Enid Legros-Wise RCA (born 1943) is a Canadian ceramic artist working mainly in porcelain.

== Early life ==
She was born in 1943 in Gaspé, Quebec. She studied at the École des beaux-arts de Montréal, from 1961 to 1964 and then at the Institut des Arts-Appliqués, also at Montréal, from 1964 to 1966. When she finished her studies in Montreal she went to live and study in Paris. From 1966 to 1969 she studied in the studio of Francine DelPierre.

== Work ==
The artist worked in fine porcelain beginning in the 1970s. Her recent work includes a large installation entitled "Veritas" which consists of one thousand porcelain cups representing the collective search for truth. This work uses a simple everyday object to engage the public in the artistic process. Enid Legros-Wise lives and works in her native Gaspé Peninsula in Quebec. Her works cover a wide spectrum of ceramics, although her main interest is in fine porcelain Her work has gained her international recognition for the scope and quality of her porcelain creations.

== Exhibitions ==
2007 ″Seduced by Clay″, Lambton Art Gallery

== Awards ==
Enid Legros-Wise has earned a number of awards and honours including

- The Croix de Chevalier in France (two distinctions),
- The Sarajevo Prize awarded at the First World Triennial of Small Ceramics, Yugoslavia 1984
- Gaspesian Cultural Merit Award, Gaspé, Quebec, 1996
- Royal Canadian Academy of Arts, Induction 2007

== Publications ==
=== By the Artist ===
- The Creative Process by Enid LeGros-Wise, 1st edition, 1997

=== About the Artist ===
- Gaspésie des artistes By Line Goyette, Christian Lamontagne Les Editions Fides, 2006, 123 pages, Legros-Wise at pages 105–109.
- "Working with Clay, 2nd Ed.," Susan Peterson, 2002.
- "Containment: The Space Within." Canadian Clay and Glass Gallery, Waterloo, Ontario, 1994.
- "Gaspésie, Visages et Paysages," Jules Bélanger, 1984.
- "Ceramic Spectrum," Robin Hopper, 1984.
- "The Craftsman's Way," Hart Massey and John Flanders, 1981.
