= Hannaniah Meir Caiserman =

- Born: March 19, 1884; Romania
- Died: December 24, 1950 (aged 66); Outremont, Quebec
- Spouse: Sarah Wittal
- Children: Ghitta Caiserman-Roth
- Writing career
- Pen name: H. M. Caiserman-Wittal; Moykil

Hannaniah Meir Caiserman (Yiddish: חנניה מאיר קייזערמאן; March 19, 1884 – December 24, 1950) was a Canadian Jewish leader, labour activist, and Yiddishist. He served as general-secretary of the Canadian Jewish Congress from its founding in 1919 until his death.

== Biography ==
Hannaniah Meir Caiserman was born in 1884 in Piatra Neamț, Romania. He received a traditional religious Jewish education, but later abandoned his religious observance after moving to Bucharest. He began publishing literary work in 1906, contributing to journals such as Vocea Dreptatei, Mevasseret Zion, and România Muncitoare.

Caiserman immigrated to Canada in 1910, settling in Montreal. He was involved in founding the Canadian Jewish Congress in 1919, serving as its general-secretary from 1934 until his death, apart from its period of dormancy in the 1920s and early 1930s.

He also contributed to the establishment of the Jewish Immigrant Aid Society of Canada in 1920, the Canadian Zionist Organization in 1925–1926, the Jewish Public Library, and various Jewish educational initiatives.

Alongside his organizational work, Caiserman was active as a writer, editor, and art critic. In 1934 he edited the anthology Jewish Poets in Canada.
