= Dora Wasserman Yiddish Theatre =

Theater group

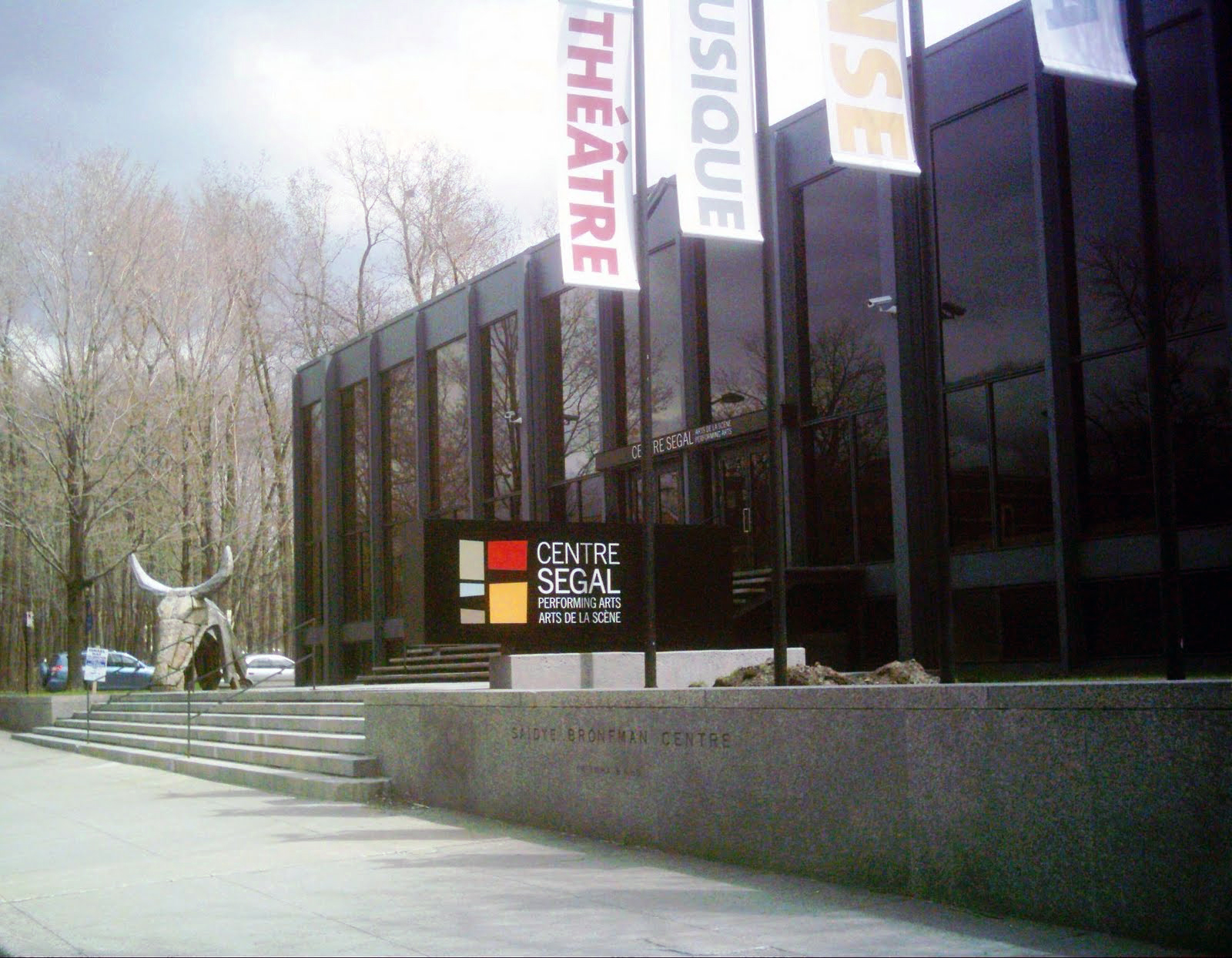

The Dora Wasserman Yiddish Theatre, a branch of the Segal Centre for Performing Arts, was founded in Montreal in 1958 by Dora Wasserman (1919–2003), a Soviet-Ukrainian-Jewish-Canadian actress, playwright, and theatre director.

The first play was The Innkeeper. Wasserman directed over 70 plays over four decades. One review said that "the most successful of these was A Bintel Brief, based on immigrants' letters to the advice column of the Jewish Daily Forward", referring to a Yiddish newspaper.

The Dora Wasserman is one of the few remaining Yiddish theaters in the world.

== See also ==
- Federation CJA
- Jews in Montreal
