= Joyce Borenstein =

Canadian director and animator

- Born: Montreal, Quebec, Canada
- Education: B.A., M.F.A.
- Alma mater: McGill University; California Institute of the Arts
- Occupations: Animator; director; writer

Joyce Borenstein is a Canadian film director and animator. Borenstein worked in the independent animation field in the 1970s before joining the National Film Board of Canada in the 1980s, culminating in the short animated documentary The Colours of My Father: A Portrait of Sam Borenstein (1992) about her father, painter Sam Borenstein, which was nominated for an Academy Award for Best Short Documentary at the 65th Academy Awards.

== Early life and education ==
Joyce Borenstein was born in Montreal, Quebec. She is the daughter of Sam and Judith Borenstein. She received a Bachelor of Arts in piano performance at McGill University in 1971, and later received a Masters in Film Animation at the California Institute of the Arts in 1974.

== Career ==
Borenstein's career began with her debut Tricycle in 1970. She began free-lancing at the National Film Board of Canada in 1976 when she created Traveller's Palm, a visualization of the poem by P.K. Page, done in bas-relief clay animation. In 1980, Borenstein became a member of the publication board of the International Animated Film Association (ASIFA) in Canada, a newsletter focusing mainly on the activity of Canadian members of the association. Borenstein's work has been showcased by Quickdraw Animation Studios and at the Genie Awards, the Columbus International Film & Video Festival, and the Festival of Films on Art in Lausanne, Switzerland. She is the company officer of Illumination Animation Inc., an animation company based in Montreal and active since 1994 that has produced several of her films including Mother's Colours (2011), One Divided by Two: Kids and Divorce (1997) and Lida Moser Photographer (2018). From 1984 to 2008, Borenstein was a part-time professor in film animation at Concordia University.

Borenstein's best known work is the biographical documentary The Colours of My Father: A Portrait of Sam Borenstein, released in 1992. Produced by the National Film Board and Imageries Inc., the film details the life and career of her father Sam Borenstein. It includes interviews with her mother, Judith; archival material; and a combination of Borenstein's original animation, reproductions of her father's work, and time-lapse sequences taking place in Montreal and the Laurentian Mountains.

== Filmography ==
- 1970 Tricylcle
- 1972 Opus 1
- 1974 Revisited
- 1976 Traveller's Palm
- 1977 Onions and Garlic
- 1981 Five Billion Years
- 1983 La Plante
- 1987 The Man Who Stole Dreams
- 1992 The Colours of My Father: A Portrait of Sam Borenstein
- 1997 One Divided by Two: Kids and Divorce
- 2011 Mother's Colours
- 2018 Lida Moser Photographer
