= Tobie Steinhouse =

Canadian painter and printmaker (born 1925)

- Born: Tobie Thelma Davis; April 1, 1925 (age 101); Montreal, Quebec
- Known for: painter and printmaker
- Spouse: Herbert Steinhouse (m. 1947)

Tobie Steinhouse RCA (born April 1, 1925) is a Canadian painter and printmaker.

== Early life ==
She was born in Montreal, Quebec to Jewish Romanian-born parents. Growing up in the Mile-End district of Montréal, Tobie attended Baron-Byng High School, where she studied with Anne Savage– a critically acclaimed Canadian painter and founding member of the Canadian Group of Painters.

== Education ==
Tobie Steinhouse earned a diploma from Sir George-Williams University in Montréal (now Concordia University) in Engineering Drawing. After graduation, she was hired as a draughtswoman, designing Anson warplanes from 1944 to 1945. During this time, she also worked for the Royal Canadian Air Force illustrating manuals. At the end of the war, Steinhouse attended the renowned Art Students League of New York with a scholarship to study art. After she graduated, Tobie went to Paris, France to study art further at the École des Beaux-Arts de Paris.

== Artistic career ==
After graduating from École des Beaux-Arts de Paris, various reputable French art galleries began to feature work. These include the Salon de l’Art Libre, the Salon d’Automne, and the Salon de la Jeune Peinture. Tobie's first solo exhibition occurred in 1957 at Galerie Lara Vincy. Shortly after this exhibition, she worked in the studio of abstract painter Arpad Szenes. In 1961, Steinhouse began working at Atelier 17 with Stanley William Hayter, known now as one of the most significant printmakers of the 20th century. After her time in Paris, Steinhouse returned to Montréal with her husband. She became a founding member of L’atelier Libre de Recherches Graphiques and La Guilde Graphique. Additionally, Steinhouse became the president of the Canadian Group of Painters in 1967, and was elected to the Royal Canadian Academy of Arts in 1972. Later in her career, Tobie taught printmaking at McGill University, and studied Japanese calligraphy under Hiroko Okata. To Steinhouse, calligraphy creates a serene space where artists can investigate the relationship between looking and doing. She received awards for her calligraphy at the International Exhibition of Japanese Calligraphy competition, held at the Tokyo Metropolitan Art Museum.

== Major influences ==
=== Anne Savage ===
Tobie Steinhouse was tremendously influenced by Anne Savage's modern view on art and the art world; she was especially inspired by Anne's progressive pursuits concerning female independence and repute in the male-dominated art sphere. For example, Savage was involved in the Beaver Hall Group– an all-women art collective striving for a "new kind of art," which Steinhouse recalls as demonstrating Savage's inspiring "modern way of looking" that informed her own work. Additionally, Savage was involved in Les Fammeuses – an all-women charity art show under the aegis of Savage in 1999. This show was originally conceived to showcase established female artists, but also to provide a platform for up-and-coming female artists to present their work, in order to raise money and support women and children who have been victims of domestic violence. It started in 1986 as a small event hosting 300 visitors, but since then has become a highly reputable show raising tens of thousands of dollars, attracting thousands of people to significantly support both female artists and females in the community who are in need. Steinhouse looks back at her participation in this show with appreciation and fondness. Anne Savage later became a cherished friend of Tobie's, becoming the godmother to her son.

=== Stanley William Hayter ===
While working at Atelier 17 (Hayter's studio), Steinhouse was exposed to many artists, including Pablo Picasso and Joan Miró, and other artists from Japan, South America, Germany, and Italy. This cultural diversity as well as Hayter's emphasis on experimentation and quick-pace work made this period one of immense artistic development for Steinhouse. It was at Atelier 17 where Steinhouse was first introduced to the intaglio colour process of engraving, which is a strenuous technique developed by Hayter himself that allows for several colours to be applied to the metal plate at the same time. Steinhouse found the process of intaglio printmaking physically challenging, but was extremely passionate about the medium, dedicating months of practicing lifting the plates, handling the press, and accurately working with the chemicals. Despite her being well versed in oil painting and watercolor at the time, intaglio printmaking became Steinhouse's preferred medium, and was used to create some of the works for which she is best known.

== Style ==
As a result of not being able to lift some of the heavier rollers often used in printmaking, Steinhouse uses the smaller 20-pound rollers, using each one separately; this results in a vertical line running down the middle of her work which has become her trademark. Her work usually uses a warm colour palette, and has been described as muted, layered, abstract, and highly textural, with a softness found in French Impressionist paintings. Common motifs found in her work are landscapes, houses, and domestic objects, evoking the memory and ephemera of every-day life; often, she uses images taken from her immediate surroundings such as her window at home. Additionally, she is heavily inspired by natural light – sensitive to its variations depending on time of day and place, as well as poetry. For example, Steinhouse has used Miriam Waddington’s Into My Green World as inspiration for some of her pieces, which focusses on the beauty of nature as an antidote to the ugliness of modern urban life.

== Awards and honors ==
Tobie Steinhouse has earned many awards and honors. These include: the Jessie Dow Prize for Painting in 1967, the Sterling Trust Award of the Society of Canadian Painters, Etchers, and Engravers, the Canadian Centennial Medal in 1967, and the Purchase Award from the Thomas Moore Institute in 1999.

== Exhibitions ==
Tobie’s art is recognized world-wide. She has been included in preeminent international printmaking Biennials in Chile, England, Scotland, Venezuela, Italy, Switzerland, and the United States. Additionally, her work is represented in the Confederation Centre Art Gallery, The External Affairs Ministry of Canada, The Winnipeg Art Gallery, The Canadian Embassy in Moscow, The McMicheal Canadian Art Collection, The Montreal Museum of Fine Arts, The Montreal Contemporary Art Museum (Musée d’art contemporain de Montréal), and The National Gallery of Canada. Recently, a major retrospective of Tobie was held at Stewart Hall in Pointe-Claire in 2012, and Galerie Jean-Claude Bergeron had an exhibition of her work in 2015.

== Personal life ==
Steinhouse married CBC producer and author Herbert Steinhouse in 1947. They met while she was studying at the Art Students’ League in New York. At the time, Herbert was volunteering for the United Nations Relief and Rehabilitation Administration and was doing his master's degree at the New School for Social Research. While they were in Paris, Herbert was on a Canada Council grant to write a book. Together, they have two sons. Tobie now lives in Westmount in Montréal, Quebec. While she was working at McGill University teaching printmaking, one of her students accidentally poured acid directly onto a plate without diluting it, causing damage to her throat; a lifetime of using strong acids in the etching process exacerbated this damage. Consequently, Steinhouse speaks softly.

== Artist statement ==
"Giving life to a simple sheet of metal; accepting the challenge to confer to it a certain meaning and an individual atmosphere through the colour, the form and the content - this is fascinating for me. I love etching. The process fascinates me. Of course, I also do watercolour, drawing and oil painting but again and again I return to etching. Poetry is a vital source of inspiration for me, a way of communicating inner visions and feelings. It creates a world of serenity, leaving my reveries free to roam while safeguarding my thoughts. Transient fashions and tendencies of the moment are fleeting. For the artist there is only one truth: to be honest with ourselves. It is a philosophy that comes with many years of practicing the "métier," with maturity, with the experiences of life itself, with a personalized sensitivity permitting the expression of one's own unique vision."
