= Alfred Pinsky =

Canadian painter

Alfred Pinsky (March 31, 1921 - November 21, 1999) was a Canadian artist and art educator. He was described as part of the informal Jewish Painters of Montreal group.

== Professional history ==
Pinsky's artistic education began at Baron Byng High School, where he was a student of, and later assistant to, Anne Savage.

During the Second World War, Pinsky served in the Royal Canadian Air Force, and subsequently moved to Nova Scotia; he later returned to Montreal, where he co-founded the Montreal Art School.

In 1960, when Sir George Williams University established its Department of Fine Arts, Pinsky served as its first chairman, in 1974, Sir George Williams University merged with Loyola College to become Concordia University, and in 1975, Pinsky became Concordia's first Dean of Fine Arts.

His students included Mary Pratt and Joan Rankin.

== Personal life ==
In 1945, Pinsky married fellow artist Ghitta Caiserman; they had one daughter, Kathe, but divorced in 1959. He subsequently married fellow artist Claire Hogenkamp.

== Honors ==
Every year, Concordia University awards the Alfred Pinsky Medal to the highest-ranking student graduating with a Bachelor of Fine Arts.
