= Esther Wertheimer =

Canadian sculptor (1926-2016)

- Born: Estera Sheps; 1926; Łódź, Poland
- Died: August 18, 2016 (aged 89–90); Montreal, Quebec, Canada
- Spouse: William Wertheimer
- Elected: Director and Founding Member, Saint Laurent Art Association/Society, Ville St-Laurent, Quebec (1960–1965); Sculptors Society of Canada (1985)

Esther Wertheimer (née Estera Sheps) (1926 – August 18, 2016) was a Canadian sculptor and educator. She is known for her semi-abstract figurative bronze sculptures and portrait busts in terra cotta. During the 1970s, 1980s, and 1990s, Wertheimer lived semi-annually at the artist's colony and sculpture foundry in Pietrasanta, Italy.

== Career ==
She was born in Łódź, Poland, and emigrated with her parents to Canada as a baby. She grew up in Montreal, and studied dance at age eight and later, ballet. She also began to paint as a child and in her youth took art lessons from Alexander Bercovitch (1940–1950), and also with Herman Heimlich and Fritz Brandtner. During the Depression she worked to help support her family, while young. Later, encouraged by her former high school art teacher, Anne Savage, she studied art at the School of the Montreal Museum of Fine Arts (1958–1963), and in 1960, became the founding member and director of the Saint Laurent Art Society in Ville Saint-Laurent (a Montreal municipality), where she taught from her studio, at the YMCA, and organized annual spring exhibitions at Saint Laurent City Hall with local artists. In 1964, she continued her studies at the John Byers School of Sculpture in Montreal.

In 1967, Wertheimer left Montreal and moved to Europe, supported by a Canada Council travel grant and a Borsa di Studio from the Italian government. In 1966, she attended a summer program at the International Academy of Fine Arts in Salzburg, Austria. From 1967 to 1968, she specialized in sculptural studies at the Florence Academy of Fine Arts (Accademia di Belle Arti di Firenze). Her time in Italy was a turning point in her career. She ceased painting and from then on devoted herself to sculpture, perfecting a bonded bronze medium. She returned to Montreal in 1969, and in 1970 was hired by Loyola College, in Montreal as a professor and coordinator, remaining till 1974. In 1973, she earned her BA at Loyola, graduating in 1973, and attended Goddard College, Vermont, graduating with her MA in 1975. In 1976, Wertheimer executed a series of sculptures depicting sports figures for the 1976 Olympic Games in Montreal, one of which was purchased by the Government of Canada's Department of Sports and Recreation for the Sports and Art Collection. In 1977, Wertheimer was included in Marbres et bronzes, an exhibition organized by the Centre culturel canadien in Paris presenting six Canadian sculptors working at the artist colony at Pietrasanta, Italy.

In 1980, Wertheimer began to exhibit her polished bronze figural sculptures in cities in Florida, USA. She traveled to Japan in 1989, seeking exhibitions and commissions, and by 1997 had won nine public sculpture competitions there. During the mid-1980s through to the 1990s, Wertheimer completed numerous public art commissions in Canada, USA and China. In 1991, Wallack Gallery, Ottawa, held a retrospective of her work. In 1992, Wertheimer's Primavera (Democracy), a four-metre bronze sculpture, was commissioned for Fukuoka City Hall Plaza, in Fukuoka, Japan. She was Director and Founding Member of the Saint Laurent Art Association/Society, Ville St-Laurent, Quebec (1960–1965) and the Sculptors Society of Canada (1985).

She died in Montreal on August 18, 2016.

== Selected works ==
- Primavera (Democracy) (in front of Fukuoka Town Hall Plaza) (1992)
- Caftan (at Hakone forest of sculpture), Hakone Open-Air Museum, Hakone, Japan
- Seven Dancers Okaloosa-Walton Community College, Niceville, Florida, USA
- Airborn Civic Center Library, Livermore, California, USA
- Children at Play with Hoops

== Selected awards ==
- Canada Council Travel Grant (1967)
- Borsa di Studio from the Italian Government (1967–1968)
- Elizabeth T. Greenshields Memorial Grant (1969)
- Gold Medal, INT Tourismo, Rome, Italy (1977)
- EUR Europa Primio, Rome, Italy (1977)
- 3rd Prize (for Caftan), Rodin Third National Sculpture Competition, Hakone, Open-Air Museum, Hakone, Japan (1989)
- International Arts Award, B'nai B'rith Foundation, Washington, DC, USA (1997)
