= Joan Rankin =

Canadian artist (1927–2014)

Joan Rankin (September 19, 1927 – March 4, 2014) was a Canadian abstract artist.

Rankin was born Joan Melvin Dowswell in Calgary, Alberta, but moved with her family a year later to Regina, Saskatchewan. During her childhood she took a drawing class at Regina College and was a member of her high school camera club; in her grade twelve year she took a course with Augustus Kenderdine. He was one of her instructors at the University of Saskatchewan, from which she received a bachelor's degree in 1950; another instructor was Nikloa Bjelajac. She continued her studies with Kenneth Lochhead, and in 1954 was hired as the Saskatchewan Golden Jubilee graphic artist. In the same year Vision magazine hired her as its art director; she remained in the position for ten years. Beginning in 1960, after the death of her husband, she served as Supervisor of Art for the public school system of Moose Jaw, leaving the position in 1982 to become art instructor at A.E. Peacock Collegiate in the same town. She retired from this position in 1987. Rankin continued her artistic development during her career by attending the artists' workshops at Emma Lake in the 1950s, taking classes with Clement Greenberg, Jules Olitski, Lawrence Alloway, and Frank Stella. With Yves Gaucher and Alfred Pinsky she took lessons at Concordia University, which awarded her a master's degree in art education in 1969.

Rankin began her career as a painter, but later began to experiment with other media, including photography, clay, fiber, stained glass, and papermaking; the last two she studied at the Pilchuk International Glass School and the Emily Carr University of Art and Design. Her work has been exhibited widely in Canada, both in solo and in group shows, and is held in numerous private and public collections. Her daughter is the glass artist Susan Rankin.
