= Lisa Rubin =

Canadian theatre director (born 1977)

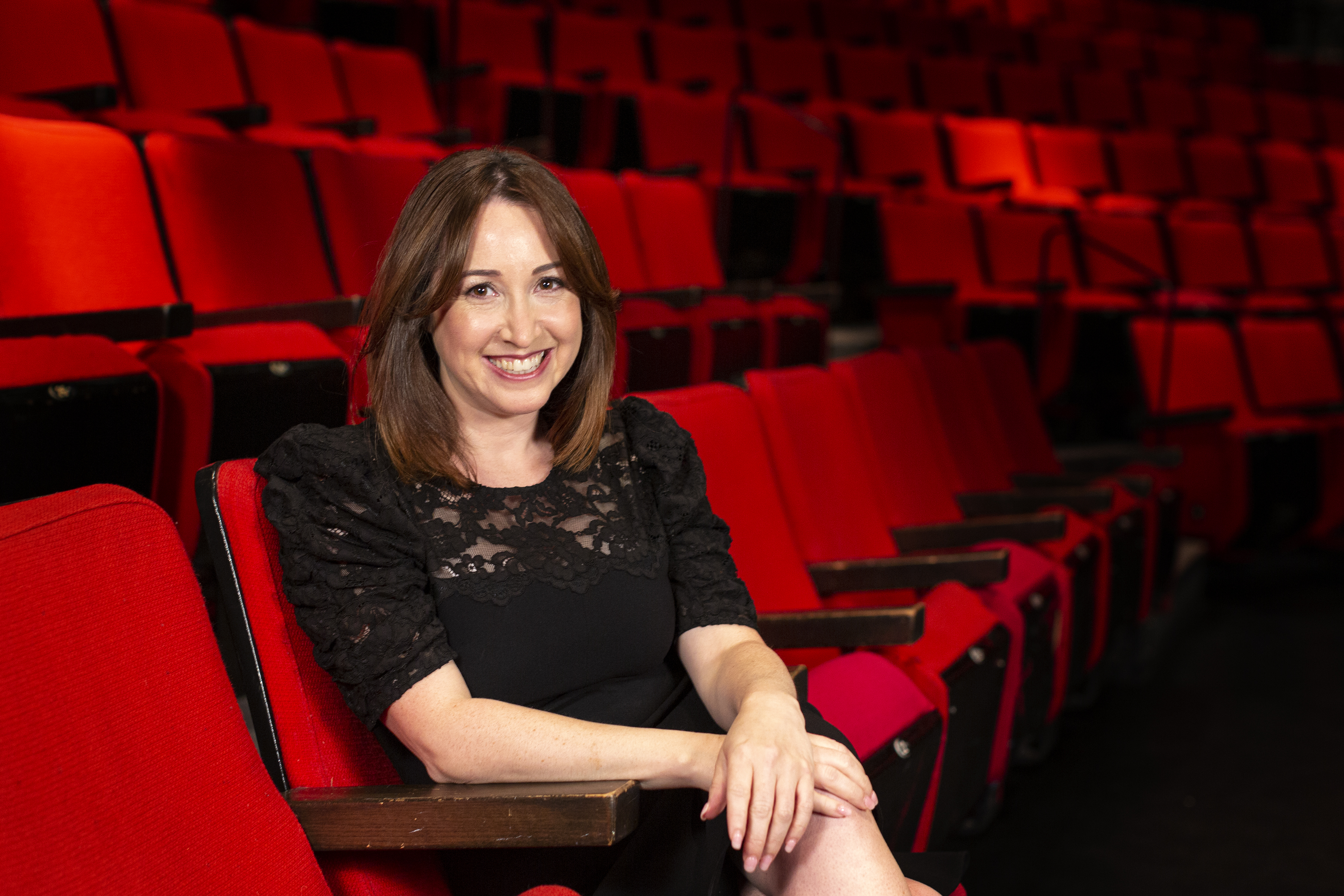
Lisa Rubin at the Segal Centre (photo by Leslie Schachter)

Lisa Rubin (born 12 November 1977) is a Canadian theatre director. She lives in Montreal, Canada and since 2014 she is the Artistic and executive director of Segal Centre for Performing Arts.

== Biography ==
Rubin made her professional directorial debut with the production Bad Jews, during the Segal's 2015–16 season which went to tour to Toronto in 2018.

At the Segal Centre for Performing Arts, Rubin has played a role in the development of new Canadian musicals such as The Apprenticeship of Duddy Kravitz (2014), the English version of Belles Soeurs: The Musical (2017), Prom Queen (2016), The Hockey Sweater, a Musical (2017) and The Angel and the Sparrow (2018).

== Works directed ==
- Bad Jews (2016 and 2017)
- Million Dollar Quartet (2017)
- Marjorie Prime (2018)
- Indecent (2019)
- Prayer for the French Republic (2022)
