= Gurion Hyman =

Gurion Joseph Hyman
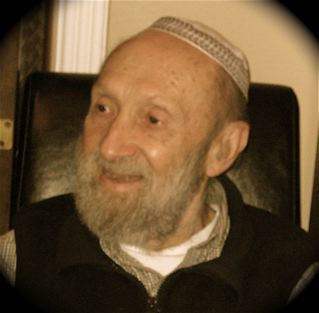
- Gurion Joseph Hyman, circa 2008
- Born: January 9, 1925; Toronto, Ontario, Canada
- Died: December 2, 2017 (aged 92); Toronto, Ontario, Canada
- Education: University of Toronto
- Occupations: Anthropologist, Linguist, Pharmacist, Composer, Artist, Translator
- Spouse: Ruth Alice (Warner) Hyman
- Children: Shayne (1954), Belarie (1956), Avi (1963)
- Parent(s): Ben Zion Hyman; Fannie Konstantynowski

Gurion Joseph Hyman (January 9, 1925 – December 2, 2017) was a Canadian anthropologist, linguist, pharmacist, composer, artist, and translator. Primary contributions have been (a) liturgical compositions for the Passover Haggadah and Sabbath prayer service, (b) translations into English as well as the setting to music of several internationally acclaimed Yiddish poets, (c) an (ongoing) project to write an etymological dictionary of Yiddish, and (d) proprietor of the second branch of Hyman's Book and Art Shoppe.

== Early life ==
Gurion Joseph Hyman was born in Toronto, Ontario, Canada, and lived above his parents’ bookstore on Spadina Avenue, Hyman's Book and Art Shoppe, until marrying Ruth Alice Warner in 1952. The son of prominent Jewish community activists, Ben Zion Hyman and Fannie Konstantynowski (a descendant of Rabbi Shabbatai ha-Kohen), Gurion Hyman graduated from the Pharmacy program at the University of Toronto in 1946. During his early years, Gurion Hyman was exposed to multiple languages and developed fluency or significant proficiency in English, Yiddish, Hebrew, Russian, and Polish. At the same time, he received formal piano training.

== Death ==
Gurion Hyman died of old age on December 2, 2017, in Toronto, Ontario, at home, surrounded by members of his family. He had been married for more than 65 years and left 3 children and 10 grandchildren.

== Career highlights ==
After graduating in Pharmacy, Hyman worked for a time as a dispensing pharmacist, most notably at Halpren Drugs on Spadina Avenue in Toronto. In 1952, Hyman, along with his wife, Ruth, opened a branch of the family bookstore business on Eglinton Avenue in the Cedarvale/Forest Hill area of Toronto.

In 1962, the couple sold the bookstore and Hyman returned to the University of Toronto to pursue a career in Linguistic Anthropology. His primary area of scholarship was the reconstruction of Proto-Semitic, with particular emphasis on demonstrating the relationship between Hebrew and Aramaic using Noam Chomsky's deep structures theory.

In 1973, Hyman resumed his career as a dispensing pharmacist, working until 1990 at The Sheppard Pharmacy (owner: Sidney Brown). Sheppard Pharmacy was located at Bathurst Street and Sheppard Avenue in Toronto's North York borough, and through most of the 1980s had the largest volume of senior citizen prescriptions in Canada. Hyman's role was to facilitate communication with the large and linguistically diverse client base of this pharmacy.

During this entire period, Hyman pursued an avocation as a composer, primarily of liturgical music, and by 1975 had completed his major work, a complete musical score for the Haggadah of Pesach (Passover), which was eventually published in 1999. A second major liturgical work based on the Sabbath prayer service is due for publication in 2009.

In the 1990s, Hyman began working on compositions (and in some cases translations) of the poetry of Yiddish and Hebrew writers. Prominent among those have been Peretz Miransky, Simche Simchovitch, Avraham Sutskever, and Natan Alterman. Two collections have been published to date (see below), and the music has been featured in a number of venues, primarily performed by the Toronto-based Klezmer/Yiddish band De Shpeelers. More recently, Hyman has begun working with Spanish poetry and translating Yiddish poetry to Spanish. He has also completed several translations of Sherlock Holmes into Yiddish.

== Etymological Dictionary of Yiddish ==
An ongoing project is to produce an Etymological Dictionary of the Yiddish Language using multiple resources to 'best estimate' the origin of words (Germanic, Semitic, Slavic, other). An intensive study of the 'word' in the original language is made. After compiling 'all' information available, the material is separated into three sections (a) Dictionary Entry with evolutionary path (b) Cross-referenced to Dictionary of Indo-European Roots and cognates, where applicable (in planning is a similar section for Proto-Semitic roots) (c) A definitional section of Yiddish-English correspondence.

Presently completed are words starting with 'aleph-bais', also preliminary work on words starting with 'aleph-yod', as well as some with 'shin-aleph'.

== Works ==
- Songs of Joy and Consolation. Toronto: 1988. Music and translation are based on the poetry of Simcha Simchovitch.
- Fruit from a Songtree. Toronto: 1990. Music based on the poems of Peretz Miransky (selected from the collections "Shures Shire" and "Nit Derzogt".)
- Sing them to Your Children: New Melodies for the Passover Haggadah and related texts. Toronto: 1999.
- Memorial to Peretz Miransky. Mendele: August, 1993.
- Semantics of O'GUL & HOIL. Mendele: August, 1993.
