= Samuel Gesser =

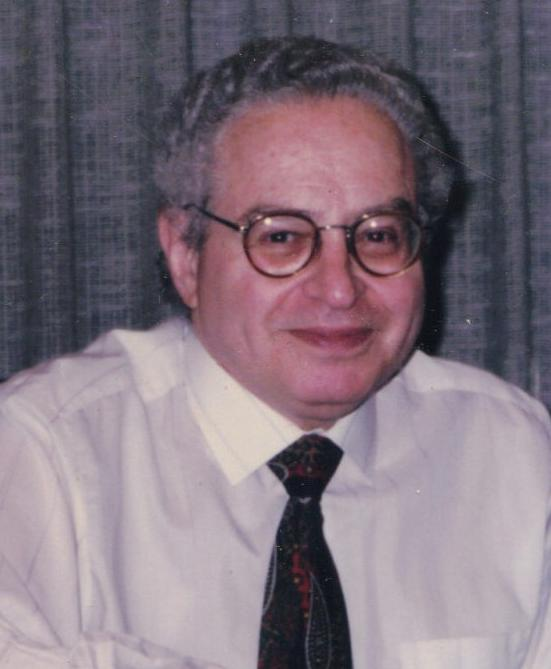
Sam Gesser

Samuel (Sam) Gesser, CM (7 January 1930 – 1 April 2008) was a Canadian impresario, record producer and writer.

== Early life ==
Born the son of Polish immigrants, he grew up in the Plateau-Mont-Royal district of Montreal, where he attended Baron Byng High School. One night, he got caught in his regular habit of sneaking into a local cinema, and correctly predicted to the manager that "One day I'll be presenting shows here, so you better let me in." Gesser negotiated being allowed to remain if he helped to clean up after the shows, and reported having learnt much about all aspects of the entertainment business as a result.

== Working life ==
Between 1949 and 1959 Gesser worked as a commercial artist, while writing hundreds of scripts for CBC radio and TV. During the late 1940s and early 1950s Gesser also travelled throughout Quebec making recordings of French Canadian fiddle tunes and folk songs, which he released on the Allied Records record label. In addition, he presented programs about folk music on CFCF and on the CBC.

While browsing in a Chicago record store in 1948, he bought a disc by blues guitarist and singer Lead Belly released by Folkways Records, an American label not distributed in Canada. Gesser travelled to New York and after an unscheduled meeting with Folkways founder Moses Asch, became the Canadian representative for the label. Noticing that the Folkways catalog contained little Canadian folk music, Asch approved Gesser making recordings to fill the gap, provided he purchased a hundred copies of each. Inspired by ethnomusicologists Marius Barbeau, and Carmen Roy, and less concerned by sales than by a desire to preserve the music, Gesser went on to record and produce about 100 discs. Among the artists and folklorists he worked with were Hélène Baillargeon, Edith Fowke, Helen Creighton, Hyman Bress, Jean Carignan, Jacques Labrecque, Monique Leyrac, Alan Mills, Leonard Cohen and Irving Layton.

Recognizing that concerts would help sell records, in 1953 Gesser brought folk singer Pete Seeger to Montreal, beginning a lifelong friendship. After months of work, Gesser made $200 on this first venture into concert promotion. He went on to be described as the "best impresario in the world" by singer Harry Belafonte, one of many artists whose concerts he produced in Montreal and elsewhere during a more than fifty-year career. Other acts included Nana Mouskouri, Joan Baez, Danny Kaye, Glenn Gould, Liberace, Janis Joplin, Maureen Forrester, Isaac Stern, The Band, Gordon Lightfoot, the Peking Opera, Monty Python's Flying Circus, the New York Philharmonic orchestra as well as Broadway musicals. Gesser also co-founded Les Feux Follets, a French-Canadian folk dance company in 1955. Gesser headed the entertainment for the Canadian pavilion at Montreal's Expo 67 world fair in 1967, presenting more than 400 shows. He repeated his role at the Osaka World Fair in Osaka, introducing many unknown Canadian artists to an international audience.

In 1984 he produced and financed a musical adaptation of fellow Montrealer Mordecai Richler's The Apprenticeship of Duddy Kravitz. The musical began a Canadian tour in Edmonton, but closed early in Ottawa, never transferring to Broadway as had been originally planned. Gesser wrote and produced the 2000 play "Fineman's Dictionary", a comedy starring Fyvush Finkel. A further play "Dancing to Beethoven" produced in 2003 featured a cast of blind actors. Weeks before his death from cancer, he was still working on screenplays that had been optioned for production, and was also writing a third play, "Seeing the Islands".

== Honours ==
Gesser received the Order of Canada in 1993 for "contributing to Canada's cultural fabric." He was also honoured by the Smithsonian Institution, the Canadian Songwriters Hall of Fame, the Canadian Folk Walk of Fame and was the first recipient of the Resonance Award established by the Canadian Museum of Civilization to honour outstanding lifetime contributions to Canada's musical heritage.

Gesser was described as "a quiet and gentle man", and "a gentleman in every sense of the word". He married twice, and had three children from his first marriage, one of whom predeceased him.
