= Sydney S. Shulemson =

Canadian fighter pilot (1915–2007)

Sydney Simon Shulemson DFC (October 22, 1915 – January 25, 2007) was a Canadian fighter pilot, and Canada's highest decorated Jewish soldier, during World War II.

His paternal grandparents came from a town called Bacău in southern Romania and arrived in Montreal in the late nineteenth century when Shulemson was seven years old.

Growing up in Montreal, Shulemson attended McGill University. He enlisted in the Royal Canadian Air Force on September 10, 1939, and graduated from flight school in 1942. He joined RCAF 404 Squadron in Wick in Scotland, flying a Bristol Beaufighter. Shulemson downed a German flying boat on his first sortie. He pioneered techniques for rocket attacks on Axis ships in the North Atlantic.

After the war, Shulemson located aircraft and recruited pilots for Israel's growing Israeli Air Force.

Shulemson married in 1989. He died in Florida in 2007.

== Awards ==
- Distinguished Flying Cross
