= A Meeting of the People =

2004 book by Mary A. Poutanen and Roderick MacLeod

A Meeting of the People: School Boards and Protestant Communities in Quebec, 1801-1998 is a non-fiction book by Mary A. Poutanen and Roderick MacLeod. It was published by McGill-Queen's University Press in 2004. It chronicles the history of the education of Protestant Christians in Quebec. Additionally, it covers English medium schooling in the province.

== Background ==
Prior to 1998, public schools in Quebec were divided among religious lines, with Catholics having their school districts and Protestants having their own. J. Donald Wilson of the University of British Columbia wrote that in the 1800s, "religion was more important than the language of instruction in public education." Wilson added that this Protestant school system shifted into becoming "an inclusive, mainly English-language institution that increasingly resembled public schooling across North America." In 1998 the schools were reorganized into language-based systems.

== Content ==
A portion of the book discusses the education of Jewish students, who generally attended Protestant schools. Other portions discuss the education of aboriginal Canadians in the province.

== Reception ==
Wilson wrote that "This book is an important contribution to" its subject area, and that the book "is remarkably error-free".
