= Sam Borenstein =

Canadian artist (1908-1969)

- Born: 15 January 1908; Kalvarija, Lithuania
- Died: 15 December 1969 (aged 61); Montreal, PQ
- Spouse: Judith Aron (m. 1938)

Sam Borenstein (15 January 1908 – 15 December 1969) was a Canadian painter. During his forty-year career he painted numerous scenes of Montreal and Laurentian villages and Quebec landscapes. Borenstein was best known for his expressionistic cityscapes and rural scenes, but also painted numerous portraits and still lifes.

== Career ==
Red Violin circa 1948

Born in Kalvarija, Lithuania, Russian Empire in 1908, Borenstein immigrated to Canada in 1921, and moved to Montreal with his father and one of his sisters. He spent two years in Ottawa, then returned to Montreal, where he worked in the garment industry. Although he had little formal training, Borenstein took evening art classes, studying sculpture with Elzéar Soucy and drawing with Adam Sheriff Scott and John Young Johnstone, and associating with local artists Alexandre Bercovitch, Fritz Brandtner, Herman Heimlich, and Louis Muhlstock.

Boy & Sunflowers circa 1956

His first solo exhibition took place in 1934 at the Coffee House café in Montreal. In 1938, in Montreal, he saw the work of Chaïm Soutine at W. Scott & Sons. During a six-month painting trip to Brittany in 1939, Borenstein saw the work of painters such as Vincent van Gogh. Within months of his return to Canada, he had a show at the Sidney Carter Art Gallery in Montreal and was invited to join the Contemporary Arts Society. He painted in the Laurentians from the 1940s.

St-Rose in Autumn 1956

In 1966, three years before he died, Borenstein was the subject of a retrospective exhibit at the new Art Gallery of Sir George Williams University (now Concordia University). In 1992, Joyce Borenstein, the artist's daughter, a film animator and artist, produced an animated film entitled The Colours of My Father: A Portrait of Sam Borenstein, which was nominated for an Academy Award. This film also won nine international film festival awards including a Genie for Best Short Documentary.

Laurentian Summer , 1958

In 2005, there was a Borenstein retrospective titled Sam Borenstein: The Colours of Montreal curated by Jacques Des Rochers and Loren Lerner for the Montreal Museum of Fine Arts, which toured across Canada and was accompanied by a catalogue titled Sam Borenstein, written by Lerner and Des Rochers and published in 2005 by the Montreal Museum of Fine Arts in both English and French. His paintings also were included in the Jewish Painters of Montreal exhibition at the McCord Museum/The Musée national des beaux-arts du Québec in 2008. In 2011, an abridged version of the Montreal retrospective in 2005 opened at the Yeshiva University Museum in New York. It was the first solo show devoted to Borenstein outside of Canada.
