= Esther Trépanier =

Quebec art historian, curator, educator, museum director (1951–2024)

- Born: 25 September 1951; Quebec
- Died: 4 March 2024 (aged 72–73); Montreal (Quebec)
- Education: B.sp. Philosophy, 1973; MA Art Studies, from UQAM and in philosophy from the University of Paris VIII (1984), as well as doctoral studies in sociology at the University of Paris VIII; Ph.D. in art history from the University of Paris I
- Known for: Quebec art historian, curator, educator, and museum director
- Partner: Jacques Tremblay
- Awards: Knight of the National Order of Quebec (2012); Raymond Klibansky Prize from the Canadian Federation of Humanities and Social Sciences (1999-2000); JI Segal Prize (2010); Marcel-Couture Prize from the Salon du Livre de Montréal (2011)

Esther Trépanier CQ, FRSC (September 25, 1951 – March 04, 2024) was one of the foremost Quebec art historians, especially regarding artists in Quebec of the first half of the 20th century. She was also a prominent curator, educator and museum director.

== Career ==
Trépanier was born in Quebec. She received her B.sp. Philosophy (1973); her M.A. in Art Studies, from the Université du Québec à Montréal (UQAM) and in philosophy from the University of Paris VIII (1984), as well as doing doctoral studies in sociology at the University of Paris VIII. She received her Ph.D. in art history at the University of Paris 1 (Sorbonne) (1991).

Her doctoral thesis in Paris was published as "Peinture et modernité au Québec 1919-1939", by Nota Bene in 1998 and favorably reviewed as an offering on a difficult subject. It won the research prize from the Canadian Museum Association in 1988 because it offered a "Better understanding of who contributed significantly to modernity in this country". In it, Trépanier wrote about numerous Quebec painters in the first half of the 20th century but widened the field to include many worthy but lesser known figures. She illuminated the forgotten and little-known corners of Quebec art history which led to her research during the following decades, said Le Devoir later.

She taught in the Department of Art History at UQAM from 1981 to 2020 with breaks to direct museums. In 1988, she organized the first retrospective dedicated to Jewish artists who worked in Montreal between 1930 and 1945 at the Centre Saidye Bronfman; the exhibition was reissued and circulated by the Musée national des beaux-arts du Québec (MNBAQ) and presented at the McCord Museum, followed by a publication "Jewish painters of Montreal: Witnesses of their time, 1930-1948" (Éditions de l'Homme, 2008). She also organized for the MNBAQ a retrospective of Marian Dale Scott, Marian Dale Scott: Pioneer of Modern Art, which traveled to seven Canadian cities between 2000 and 2003.

From 2000 to 2007, Trépanier directed the ESG UQAM School of Fashion and from 2008 to 2011, she served as Director General of the MNBAQ (2008–2011). For MNBAQ, she contributed to The nude in Canadian modern art, 1920-1950 (2009), organized by the MNBAQ and co-authored the catalogue, and offered an exhibition program devoted to the arts of Quebec from the contact period in the 17th century to the present day. She organized and circulated two exhibitions devoted to women artists of Quebec in the 20th Century drawn from the museum's collections. With Véronique Borboën, a professor at UQAM, she co-curated the exhibition Fashion and Appearances in Quebec Art, 1880-1945 which drew the attention of the Canadian Broadcasting Company and of The Globe and Mail in Toronto. The show was accompanied by a book co-authored with Borboën, "Fashion and Appearance in Quebec Art, 1880-1945" (PUQ, 2012). It also inspired Trépanier to write an essay later on fashion in three 20th-century Quebec novels, "Will Fashion Save Cinderella?" (PUM, 2023).

In 2022–2023, her exhibition Forgotten! Scott, Brandtner. Eveleigh, Webber: Revisiting Montreal Abstraction of the 1940s, was shown at the Musée d'art de Joliette, and then travelled in Quebec. The publication, published in French and English versions won the 2023 prize for best exhibition catalogue from the Canadian University Art Association (CUAA) and was favorably reviewed as an exhibition and book which "effectively and rightly underscores the formal innovations and contributions to Quebec art history offered outside the often mentioned francophone artists the public has come to know and love".

Besides her exhibitions and the conferences she organized or co-organized, she authored many book chapters in journals as well as articles, and wrote or co-authored exhibition catalogues. She also lectured widely. At the Montreal Museum of Fine Arts, where she had trained the guides, she developed the educational programs and from 2014 on, a lecture series. She also lectured at the Bibliothèque et Archives nationales du Québec (BAnQ). She helped found the Équipe de recherche en histoire de l'art au Québec (2013) and the Laboratoire numérique des études en histoire de l'art du Québec (2014), both closely linked to the UQAM Department of Art History and CRILCQ, the place of literary and cultural research in Quebec.

In 2024, she died of cancer.

== Writing ==
Trépanier's gift as a writer was the ability to suggest the qualities that contributed to the modernity of Quebec's artists in the first half of the 20th century. In Morrice: the A.K. Prakash collection in Trust to the Nation (2017), for instance, in her chapter James Wilson Morrice's Quebec landscapes: outside regionism and national art, she wrote about the qualities that characterize the modernity of Morrice. Elsewhere, she discussed the strategies of modernity used by Quebec artists such as Marian Dale Scott and Marc-Aurèle Fortin and many others. Her goal as an art historian in Quebec was to re-balance an existing narrative based on a few male artists such as Borduas.

Her narrative included many women artists For instance, In the book "1920s modernism in Montreal: the Beaver Hall Group" (2015) edited by Jacques Des Rochers and Brian Foss, her chapter was titled "'As well as men': the gendering of Beaver Hall".

== Awards ==
- Raymond Klibansky Prize from the Canadian Federation of Humanities and Social Sciences (1999–2000);
- JI Segal Prize (2010);
- Marcel-Couture Prize from the Salon du Livre de Montréal (2011)
- Knight of the National Order of Quebec (2012);
