= Harry Mayerovitch =

Canadian artist (1910–2004)

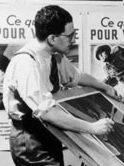
- A portrait of Harry Mayerovitch
- Born: April 16, 1910; Montreal, Quebec, Canada
- Died: April 16, 2004 (aged 94); Montreal, Quebec
- Education: School of Architecture at McGill University
- Occupation: Architect

Harry Mayerovitch RCA (April 16, 1910 – April 16, 2004), was a Canadian architect, artist, illustrator, author and cartoonist.

Mayerovitch was born in Montreal on April 16, 1910, to Romanian-Jewish parents from the region of Bessarabia. After completing a Bachelor of Arts at McGill University, he earned his degree in architecture in 1933.

Architecture projects were put on hold when Canada entered World War II, so Mayerovitch turned his attention to painting, with one painting, a war-themed work entitled Home Front, exhibited at the Montreal Museum of Fine Arts. This work garnered praise from Ottawa Journal critic Robert Ayer, which in turn caught the attention of National Film Board of Canada (NFB) founder John Grierson, who appointed Mayerovitch artistic director of the NFB's Wartime Information Board's Graphic Arts Division—even though Mayerovitch had never designed posters before. From 1942 to 1944, Mayerovitch produced World War II propaganda posters, using the artist's signature "Mayo."

Following the war, Mayerovitch resumed work as an architect and became active in urban planning.

Beginning in 1965, he taught at McGill's School of Architecture, and remained on faculty until his death. His published works include the book, How Architecture Speaks. In 2000, his 90th birthday was marked with the planting of a magnolia tree in the school of architecture's Centennial Garden. He was a member of the Order of Architects of Quebec, the Corporation of Urbanists of Quebec, the Canadian Institute of Planners, the Royal Canadian Academy of Arts, the Canadian Society of Graphic Arts, and was a Fellow of the Royal Architectural Institute of Canada.

His final published work before his death on his 94th birthday in 2004 was Way to Go, a collection of wordless cartoons published that same year by Drawn & Quarterly Press.
