= Albert and Temmy Latner Jewish Public Library =

Public library in Toronto, Ontario, Canada

Coordinates: 43°45′45″N 79°26′30″W

Albert and Temmy Latner Jewish Public Library (Toronto)
- Location: 4600 Bathurst Street; Toronto, Ontario, Canada
- Type: Jewish public library
- Established: 1941
- Dissolved: 2008

Collection
- Items collected: Books, e-books, music, cds, periodicals, maps, genealogical archives, business directories, local history

The Albert and Temmy Latner Jewish Public Library in Toronto, Ontario, Canada was founded in 1941 as the Jewish Public Library by bookseller Ben Zion Hyman. The library began as a small independent collection located at Hyman's storefront on Spadina Avenue in the late 1930s until 1941 when the public library was formally established and moved to a set of rooms in the College Street and Spadina Avenue area. It later moved to the intersection of Markham Street and Harbord Street and then Glen Park and Glenmount Avenues. In 1983, it settled in its final location in the Lipa Green Building at 4600 Bathurst Street.

The library became part of the Latner Centre of Jewish Knowledge and Heritage in 2005. However, the centre disbanded in 2008 and the library closed at that time "due to a lack of resources and a decline in circulation of books being taken out." The former library's books and resources were kept in a storage facility until 2016, when the library's collection was acquired by Mizrahi Bookstore, of Brooklyn, New York.

== See also ==
- Jewish Public Library (Montreal)
- Jewish Virtual Library
- Library Of Agudas Chassidei Chabad
