= École des beaux-arts de Montréal =

School of Fine Arts in Montreal, Canada

Coordinates: 45.5109°N 73.5706°W

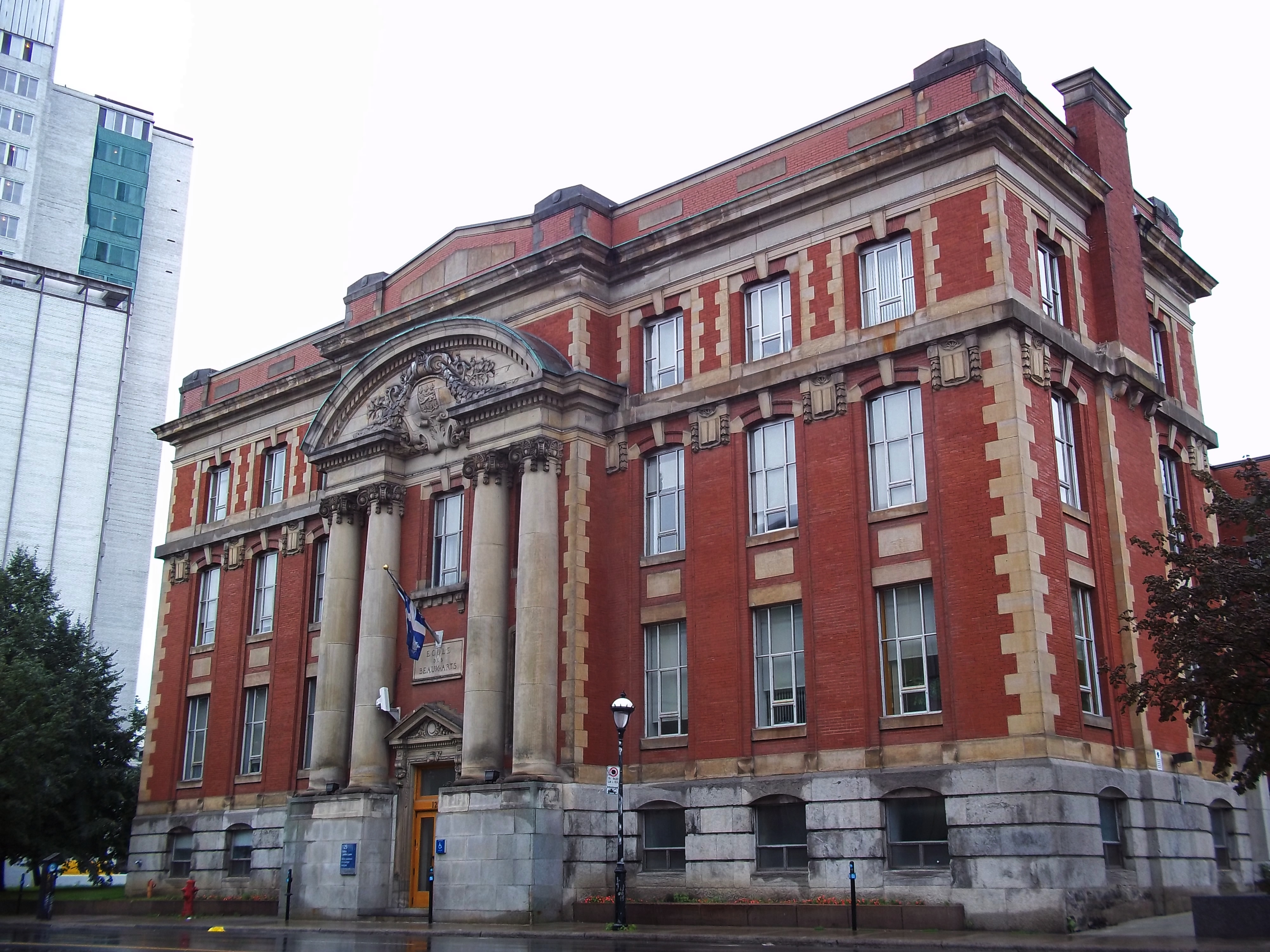
- École des beaux-arts de Montréal building in 2011
- Montreal, Quebec; Canada

Information
- Established: 1922
- Closed: 1969

École des beaux-arts de Montréal (French pronunciation: [ekɔl de boz‿aʁ də mɔ̃ʁeal]; The School of Fine Arts in Montreal; EBAM) was an educational institution founded in Quebec in 1922. The Saint-Jean-Baptiste Society was instrumental in its creation. Its former Sherbrooke Street building now houses the Office québécois de la langue française.

Faculty of the school include Edwin Holgate as well as Academy Award-winning animator and painter Frédéric Back, who taught there briefly prior to joining Radio-Canada.

The building was completed in 1922 as the Commercial & Technical High School, designed by Montreal architect Jean-Omer Marchand, and is located at 3450 Saint Urbain Street (at Sherbrooke Street) in Montreal.

In 1969, the school was incorporated into the Faculty of the Arts of the Université du Québec à Montréal.

== Notable alumni ==
- Jean L Auger
- Micheline Beauchemin
- Paul-Émile Borduas
- Ghitta Caiserman-Roth
- John Alton Collins
- Jacques Drouin
- Pierre Granche
- Sylvia Lefkovitz
- Enid Legros-Wise
- Jean Paul Lemieux
- Anna McGarrigle (1964–1968)
- Anne Isabelle McQuire (1921–2006)
- Guido Molinari
- Terry Mosher "Aislin"
- Claude Roussel
- Armand Vaillancourt
