= Jewish Public Library (Montreal) =

Jewish library in Montreal, Canada

- ייִדישע פֿאָלקס ביבליאָטעק
- 45.48906°N 73.6365°W
- Location: 5151, chemin de la Côte-Sainte-Catherine; Montreal, Quebec; H3W 1M6
- Type: Public library
- Established: 1914; 112 years ago

Collection
- Items collected: Books, e-books, music, CDs, periodicals, maps, genealogical archives, business directories, local history
- Size: 150,000 items
- Criteria for collection: Judaica, general interest, or popular fiction

Other information
- Website: jewishpubliclibrary.org

The Jewish Public Library or JPL (French: Bibliothèque publique juive, Yiddish: ייִדישע פֿאָלקס ביבליאָטעק) is a public library in Montreal, Quebec, Canada, founded in 1914. The library contains the largest circulating collection of Judaica in North America. As of 2019, the JPL had about 5,200 members. A constituent agency of Federation CJA, the Jewish Public Library is independent of the Montreal Public Libraries Network and instead receives its funding from the city's Jewish community, membership fees, donations and endowments.

== History ==
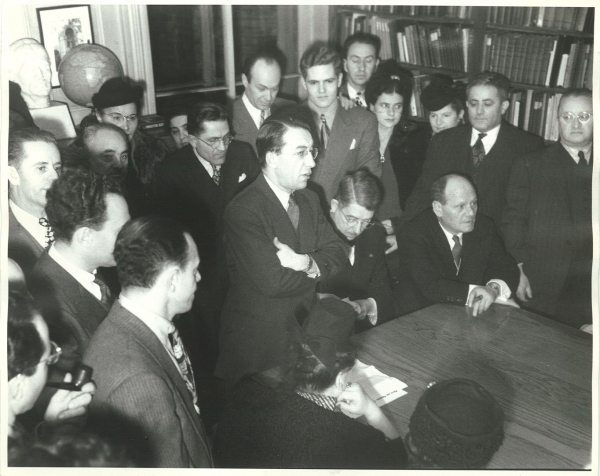
A. M. Klein (centre) at the Jewish Public Library in 1945.

Founded in 1914, the library's early history is grounded in the Yiddish-speaking immigrants who fled Europe at the turn of the 20th century. The early homes of the JPL were in rented cold water flats on St. Urbain Street and, for 20 years, on the corner of Esplanade Avenue and Mount-Royal. In the early 1970s, the patterns of Jewish migration within the city had made it apparent that the library should move again, to be nearer to other Jewish agencies and organizations. The Segal Centre for Performing Arts, YM-YWHA Jewish community centre, Montreal Holocaust Memorial Centre, and all Federation CJA offices are now within a campus on the corner of Cote Ste. Catherine Road and Westbury Avenue in Montreal's Côte-des-Neiges sector.

== Collection ==
The Jewish Public Library's collection of over 150,000 items is accessible online, including specialist collections in five languages. The Children's Library offers programs and activities with more than 30,000 items for children up to 14 years of age. The JPL is a full service lending and research library. 75% of the collection is Judaica, 25% general interest and popular fiction.

The collection itself is oriented towards both academic and popular readerships, the Judaica collection being akin to most university libraries' Judaic collections. Members of Montreal's Orthodox Jewish community also use the library for religious works. The general collection attempts a diversity of popular and literary fiction, as well as an AV collection of first-run films on VHS and DVD, and audiobooks in Yiddish. The Yiddish Book Center has digitized many of these tapes and made them available on compact disc and free online in a joint project. The JPL's collections are primarily in English, French, Hebrew, Yiddish and Russian, with other languages comprising works in its special non-circulating collections. Special collections include:

- Rare books: Ranges from incunabula to early Hebrew grammar books, liturgical works, kabbalistic treatises, Talmuds, historical tracts, and travelogues. The earliest work in collection is a copy of Josephus' Tractatus Judaice (1481).
- Jewish Canadiana: A vertical file collection of clippings, pamphlets, chapbooks, unpublished manuscripts and other ephemera about all aspects of Jewish art, culture and intellectual activity in Canada by and about Jews. It includes unpublished collections of Montreal Jewish authors, scholars, journalists, labour organizers, musicians, such as those of Rochl Korn, Lea Roback, Sam Gesser, Reuven Brainin, and many of the city's early Jewish benevolent organizations.
- Irving Layton collection: The personal library of the late Irving Layton, which includes annotated and signed copies of poetic works, philosophy, psychology, classics, literature, and an eclectic collection of non-fiction.
- German Judaica collection: In 1999, a large donation of German Judaica was presented to the Library. The scope of this collection ranges from philosophy to theology, psychology, political science, and literature.
- Ephemeral collection: A historical clippings file of Jewish life in the diaspora and Israel in Yiddish, Hebrew, Russian and other languages.
- Closed stacks: This collection comprises fragile, controversial, and older Judaica material (19th century) in many languages, and parallels the library's general collection in scope and content.
- Yizkor books: The library holds one of the largest collections of Yiddish and Hebrew Yizkor books in the world. These are the recorded histories of pre-Holocaust life in the eastern European shtetls, complete with photographs, lists of names, memoirs and the chronicled activities of the local Jewish communal organizations of each town.
- Photographs, sheet music, and multimedia archive.
- Periodicals: The Library holds collections of journals in English, French, Hebrew, and Yiddish. It includes one of the largest collection of Yiddish journals (print and microform) from Europe and Canada.

== Activities ==
The Library has an active program of cultural events and educational workshops throughout the year. During Jewish Book Month, Andrei Codrescu, Cynthia Ozick, and Salman Rushdie have all spoken at the library. It also stages dramatic readings in Hebrew, Yiddish musical evenings and Russian concerts and walking tours of Jewish Montreal are given throughout the year. First Fruits is an annual literary anthology of student writing from local high school students, and it awards the J. I. Segal Prizes bi-annually to published writers of Jewish content in various languages. Many programs represent collaborations with other organizations such as the Montreal Holocaust Museum, the Montreal Jewish Museum, and Bloomsday Montreal. The Archives offers exhibitions, tours, workshops and offers much of its content digitally.

== See also ==
- Jews in Montreal
- Albert and Temmy Latner Jewish Public Library
- Jewish Virtual Library
- Library of Agudas Chassidei Chabad
