= Baron de Hirsch Cemetery, Montreal =

Jewish cemetery in Montreal, Quebec, Canada

Baron de Hirsch Cemetery
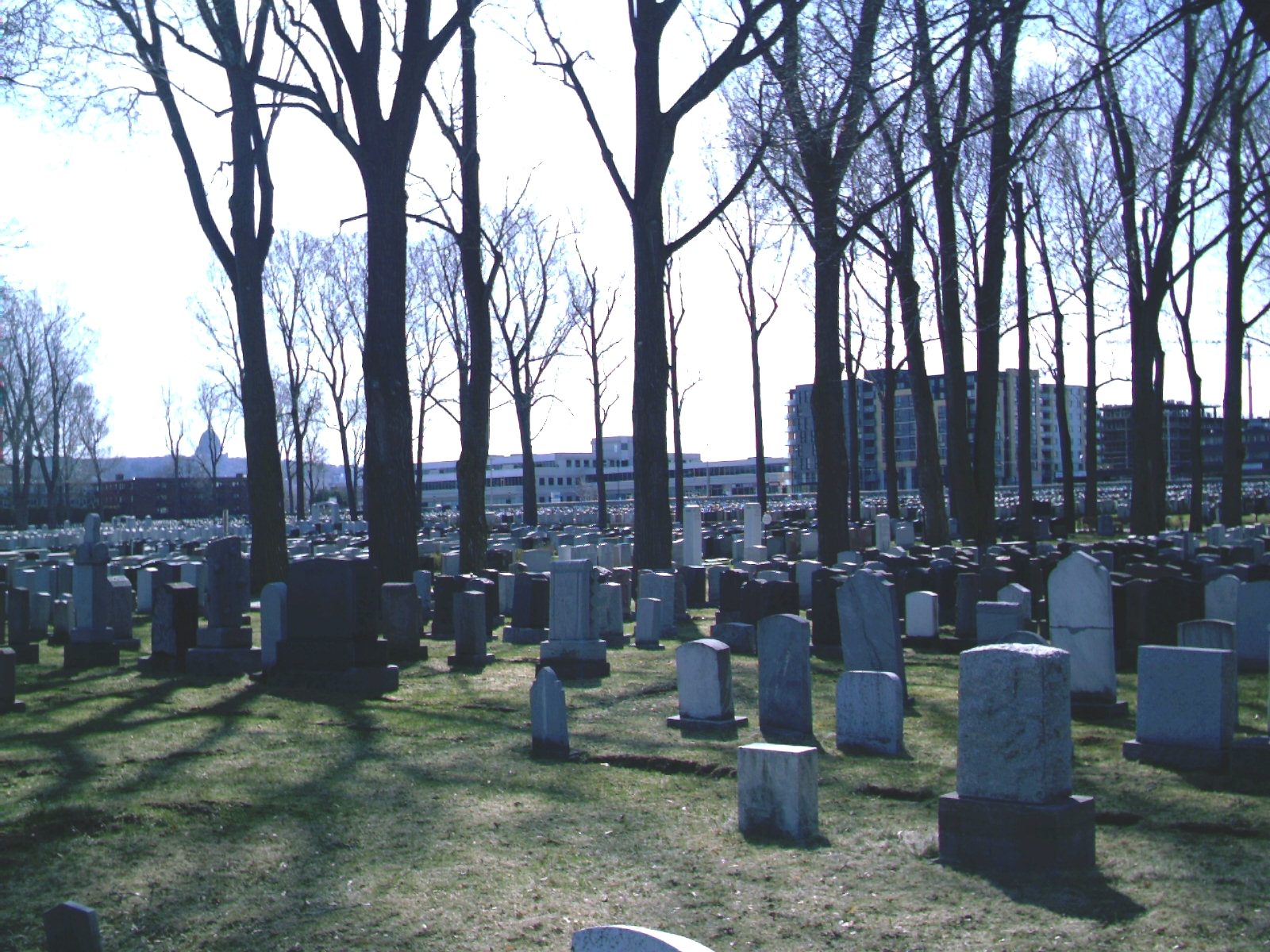
- View of the Baron de Hirsch Cemetery, towards Mount Royal.
- Interactive map of Baron de Hirsch Cemetery

Details
- Established: July 1905; 121 years ago
- Location: 5015 de la Savane; Montreal, Quebec
- Country: Canada
- Coordinates: 45.5019°N 73.6547°W
- No. of graves: >55,000
- Website: barondehirsch.com
- Find a Grave: Baron de Hirsch Cemetery

The Baron de Hirsch Cemetery (Note: Also known as the Baron de Hirsch United Cemeteries, Baron de Hirsch Affiliated Cemeteries, Baron de Hirsch Memorial Park, and de la Savane Cemetery.) is a Jewish cemetery located on the north side of de la Savane Street, between Mountain Sights and Kindersley Avenues in the Côte-des-Neiges neighbourhood of Montreal, Quebec, Canada. The cemetery is managed by the Baron de Hirsch - Back River Cemetery Inc. which also manages the Back River Memorial Garden and Agudath Achim Cemetery in Sherbrooke Quebec,

The cemetery was opened in July 1905 with funds from philanthropist Maurice, Baron de Hirsch. Since its establishment, an estimated 55,000 people have been interred in its grounds. It is divided into sections affiliated with various landsmanshaften and synagogues.

The foremen are the 3rd and forth generation of the Lahaie family, who have a section dedicated to them.

1. "History". Baron de Hirsch–Back River Cemeteries.
2. Kucharsky, Danny; Cowles, D. R. (2007). Sacred Ground on de la Savane: Montreal's Baron de Hirsch Cemetery. Véhicule Press. ISBN 978-1-55065-196-6.
3. "Baron de Hirsch – de la Savane Cemetery". Jewish Genealogical Society of Montreal.

== Notable graves and monuments ==
Notable inhabitants of the cemetery include literary figures J. I. Segal, Rachel Korn, and A. M. Klein; politician Fred Rose; and hockey player Larry Zeidel.

The cemetery contains sixteen war graves of Commonwealth service personnel: two from World War I and fourteen from World War II. It also contains 17 memorials to victims of the Holocaust.
