= Segal Centre for Performing Arts =

Theatre in Montreal, Quebec, Canada

- Centre Segal des arts de la scène
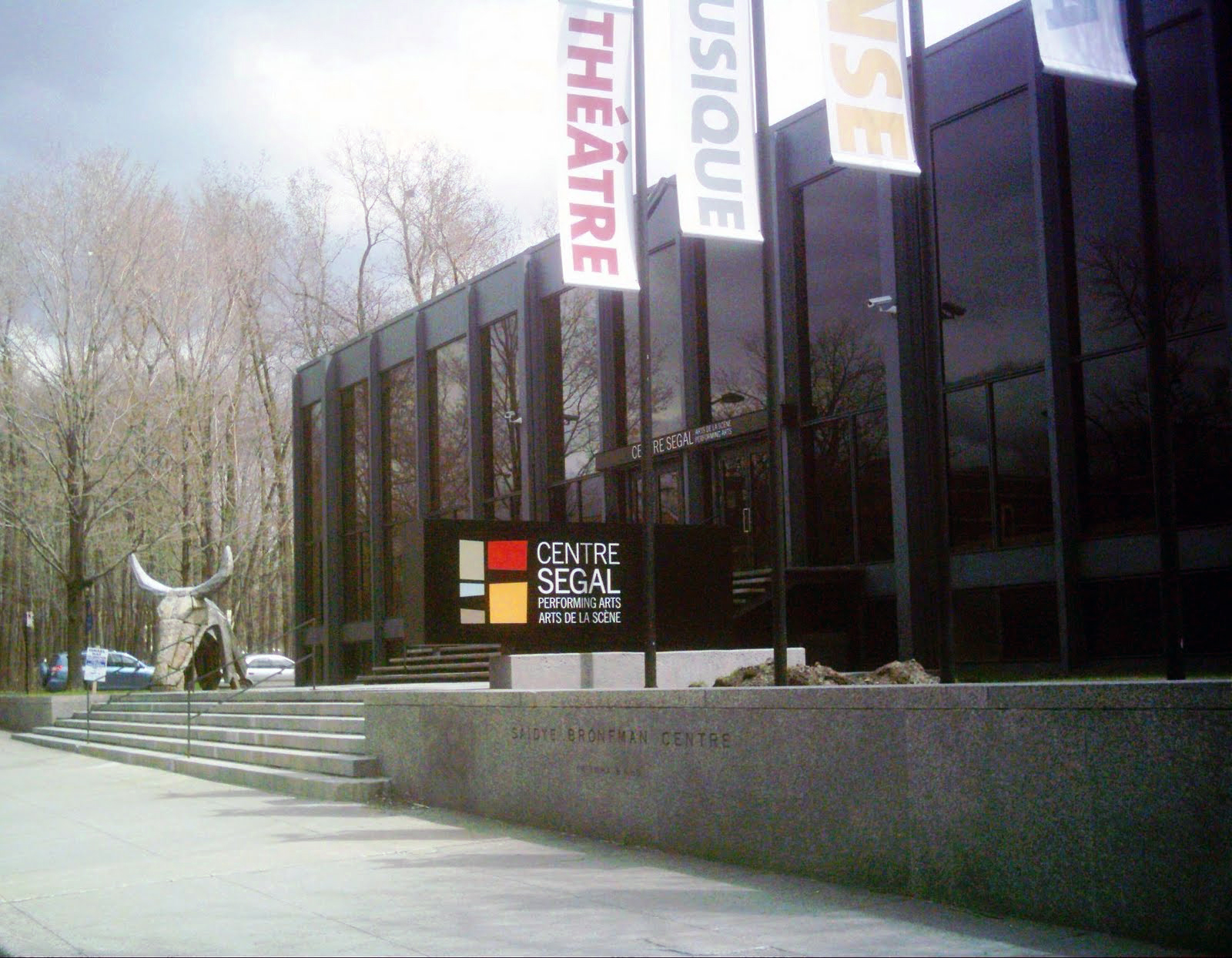
- Segal Centre for Performing Arts
- Interactive map of Segal Centre for Performing Arts
- Location: 5170, chemin de la Côte-Sainte-Catherine; Montreal, Quebec, Canada; H3W 1M7
- Coordinates: 45.488729°N 73.635674°W
- Capacity: Theatre -306; Studio - 186; CinemaSpace - 77
- Public transit: at Côte-Sainte-Catherine station

Construction
- Opened: 1967
- Architect: Phyllis Lambert

Tenant
- Dora Wasserman Yiddish Theatre

The Segal Centre for Performing Arts, formerly the Saidye Bronfman Centre for the Arts, is a theatre in Montreal, Quebec, Canada. It is located at 5170 chemin de la Côte-Sainte-Catherine, in the borough of Côte-des-Neiges–Notre-Dame-de-Grâce.

The building houses the Segal Theatre, the Academy of Performing Arts, CinemaSpace, Studio, and the Dora Wasserman Yiddish Theatre.

== History ==
=== The Saidye Bronfman Centre ===
In 1967, the children of Saidye Bronfman gave the theatre to the local community in recognition of their mother's long association with and patronage of the arts. The building that houses the theatre was designed in 1967 by Montreal architect Phyllis Lambert, a daughter of Saidye Bronfman.

=== The Segal Centre for Performing Arts ===
Following the winding-down of the Samuel and Saidye Bronfman Foundation, in 2007 the Saidye Bronfman Centre was renamed the Segal Centre for Performing Arts in acknowledgement of the financial support of Leanor and Alvin Segal in partnership with the Bronfman family. Uniting theatre, music, dance, cinema and arts education under one roof, its mission is to promote the creation, production and presentation of professional artistic work, support emerging artists and foster intercultural understanding through the arts.

The Segal Theatre is now an English-language theatre. It has expanded to become a nationally recognized venue for the performing arts with a focus on creation, innovation, diversity, and cross-cultural collaborations. Driven by a belief in the power of the arts to strengthen and connect communities, the Segal's programming emphasizes original interpretations of popular classics and contemporary works, new Canadian musicals, and engaging productions with universal appeal.

In 2008, the Segal Theatre co-produced the original musical Houdini with the Montreal Highlights Festival (dir. Bryna Wasserman). It was remounted later that year by the Montreal International Jazz Festival, the first play ever to be featured at the Festival. It was wildly successful with both French and English audiences as well as critics.

Other highlights include Sam Shepard’s Buried Child (2009) which was co-produced with theNational Arts Centre (NAC) and directed by Peter Hinton-Davis, Artistic Director of English Theatre at the NAC. Old Wicked Songs (2010, dir. Bryna Wasserman) by Jon Marans was co-produced with Théâtre du Rideau Vert and played in French as Une musique inquiétante before the original cast and crew moved to the Segal to perform the production in English.

The Segal Centre has become a major player in the development and production of new Canadian musicals. In June 2015, the Centre premiered Belles Soeurs: The Musical based on the play by Michel Tremblay with book and lyrics by René Richard Cyr, music by Daniel Bélanger, English adaptation of book and lyrics by Neil Bartram and Brian Hill, and directed by René Richard Cyr. A co-production with Copa de Oro, Belles Soeurs went on a national tour and won the Capital Critics Circle Award for Best Production after its stop at the National Arts Centre in Ottawa.

In June, 2015, the Segal Centre launched a world premiere of a musical adaptation of Mordecai Richler's novel, The Apprenticeship of Duddy Kravitz, starring Alberta-born Kenneth James Stewart as the infamous Duddy, who follows his grandfather's advice to own some land, regardless of the personal consequences.

In October 2016, the Segal Centre premiered Prom Queen: The Musical based on the true story of Marc Hall, the Ontario teenager who took his Catholic School Board to court when it refused to let him attend prom with his boyfriend. Produced by Marcia Kash with book by Kent Staines, lyrics by Akiva Romer-Segal, music by Colleen Dauncey, musical direction by Mark Camilleri, choreography by Sean Cheesman, Prom Queen: The Musical won the Playwrights Guild of Canada’s Stage West Pechet Family Musical Award at the Tom Hendry Awards in 2016.

Its second stage, The Studio, has been a venue for SideMart Theatrical Grocery; the Power Jazz series; and the Segal’s Broadway Café events, as well as guest programming.

In addition, the Segal Centre for Performing Arts houses the Dora Wasserman Yiddish Theatre, celebrating almost sixty years of dramatizing the Jewish experience.

The current Artistic Director is Lisa Rubin, who took up the position in 2014.

== Mandate ==
The Segal Centre for Performing Arts is a not-for-profit theatre company producing English-language theatre, and showcasing professional artists from Montreal and around the world.

Founded in 1967, the Segal Centre has expanded to become a venue for the performing arts, a training ground for emerging artists and a venue for jazz concerts, dance, cinema and Jewish arts and culture.

== See also ==
- Jews in Montreal
