= Simone Mary Bouchard =

Canadian painter and textile artist

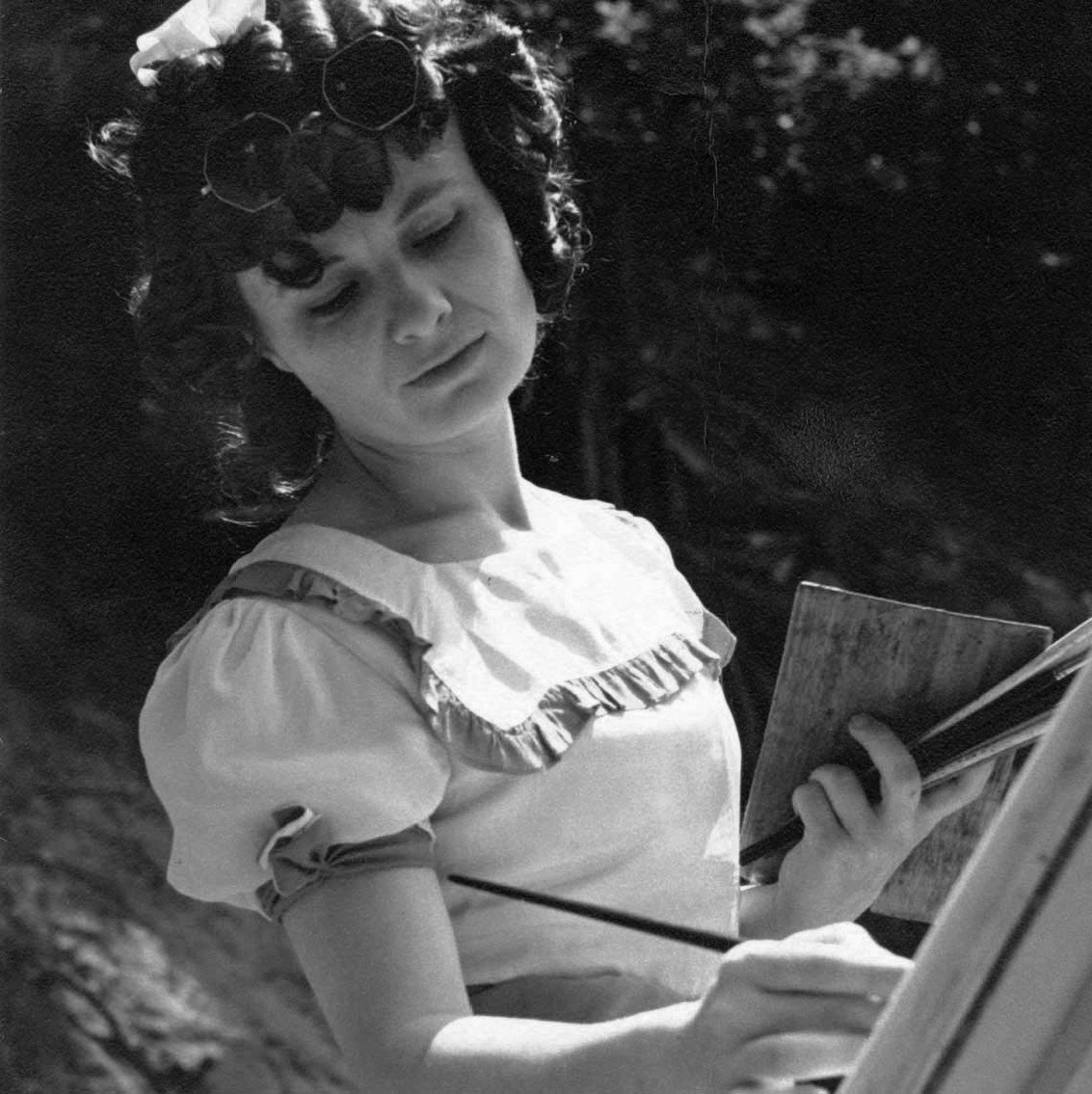
- Born: 1912; Baie-Saint-Paul, Quebec, Canada
- Died: 1945 (aged 32–33)
- Known for: Painter

Simone Mary Bouchard (1912–1945) was a Canadian painter and textile artist. She was known for her 'popular' or outsider style of painting.

== Early life ==
Simone Mary Bouchard was born in 1912 in Baie-Saint-Paul, Quebec. She began her career creating hooked rugs for the tourist trade. She became acquainted with the anthropologist Marius Barbeau, and his assistant, the ethnologist/painter Jean Palardy. Subsequently, Bouchard repaired textiles for Barbeau and produced rugs for Palardy.

== Art career ==
In 1937, her work was included in and exhibition of North American outsider artists.

Barbeau and Palardy became aware of Bouchard's paintings, which were naive genre scenes. The men brought her work to the attention of other artists and collectors.

In 1941, Bouchard was included in the Première exposition des Indépendants exhibition at Palais Montcalm in Quebec City. This exhibition was organized by Marie-Alain Couturier and included eleven members of the Contemporary Arts Society; Bouchard, Paul-Émile Borduas, Stanley Cosgrove, Louise Landry Gadbois, Eric Goldberg, John Goodwin Lyman, Louis Muhlstock, Alfred Pellan, Goodridge Roberts, Jori Smith, and Philip Surrey. The exhibition traveled to Montreal.

The Dominion Art Gallery in Montreal held retrospectives of her work in 1947 and 1952.

Her work is included in the collections of the National Gallery of Canada and the Musée national des beaux-arts du Québec.

Bouchard died in 1945 of a lung ailment.

In 2015, her work was included in The Artist Herself: Self-Portraits by Canadian Historical Artists, an exhibition co-curated by Alicia Boutilier and Tobi Bruce who also co-edited the book/catalogue.
