= Philip Surrey =

Canadian painter (1910–1990)

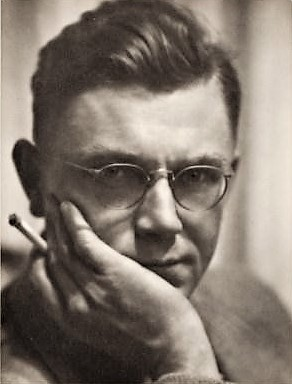
- Born: October 10, 1910; Calgary, Alberta, Canada
- Died: April 24, 1990 (aged 79); Montreal, Quebec, Canada
- Known for: Figurative Art
- Movement: Eastern Group of Painters, Contemporary Arts Society
- Spouse: Margaret Day (m. 1939)
- Awards: Order of Canada (1982), Honorary Doctorate (1981), Centennial Medal (1967)
- Elected: Royal Canadian Academy of Arts

Philip Surrey CM RCA LL. D. (October 10, 1910 – April 24, 1990) was a Canadian artist known for his figurative scenes of Montreal. A founding member of the Contemporary Arts Society, and Montreal Men's Press Club (now Montreal Press Club), Surrey was part of Montreal's cultural elite during the late 1930s and 1940s. In recognition of his artistic accomplishment he was elected to the Royal Canadian Academy of Arts, awarded a Canadian Centennial Medal in 1967 and was appointed to the Order of Canada in 1982.

A figurative expressionist, Surrey was concerned with composition and design. Painting scenes of city life, his early work featured solitary figures on street corners and in cafes or taverns during the Great Depression. His work in the 1940s and 1950s is characterized by "their sombre colours, their mysterious shadows, their eeriness, and the loneliness and secrecy of their subjects." From the 1960s on, his work became more stylized and luminous with young women or gregarious urban dwellers as subjects. Throughout his career, Surrey worked in watercolours, oils, ink, charcoal as well as lithography, and his oeuvre also includes Canadian landscapes.

== Early life and education ==
Philip Henry Howard Surrey was born on October 8, 1910, in Calgary, Alberta, the son of adventurer Harry Philip Surrey and Kate de Guerin, a relative of portraitist Richard Crosse, who taught him to read, write and sketch. As a young child, Surrey lived at Raffles Hotel in Singapore and the Grand Hotel in Calcutta, and attended St Paul's School in Darjeeling. In 1919 he was sent to a preparatory school in England where, according to biographer T.F. Rigelhof, "he was known as the Surrey boy, the stranger, the outsider and lonely without friends his age, but exotic – he had ridden camels and elephants, walked about with a pet orangutang, and conversed with snake-charmers." Following his father's request for a divorce, in 1921 his mother fled with Surrey to Manitoba, Canada, where she found work as a teacher north of Winnipeg. Surrey attended school there until age 14 when he moved to Winnipeg to complete his studies at Kelvin High School.

At age 16 he was hired as an apprentice at the commercial art firm Brigdens Limited, where, on his free time, he went on sketch outings with co-workers and discovered the work of Robert Henri and the Ashcan School. At this time, he also attended evening classes given by Lionel LeMoine FitzGerald and George Overton at the Winnipeg School of Art. In May 1927, Surrey began to paint urban scenes in earnest, completing 300 mixed-media sketches within a year. He also continued to work at Brigdens, illustrating women's wear for the 1928 and 1929 Eaton's Western Catalogue until the autumn of 1929, when he moved to Vancouver to work as a commercial artist at Cleland-Kent Engraving. In the evening he studied with Frederick Varley and Jock Macdonald at the Vancouver School of Decorative and Applied Arts (now Emily Carr University of Art and Design). During 1932 and 1933 Surrey's work was exhibited in the Canadian Show held at the National Gallery of Canada in Ottawa. In 1936, inspired by the work of John Sloan and the Socialist Party of America, Surrey left Vancouver for Greenwich Village. He attended the Art Students League of New York where he studied for three months under Alexander Abels and Frank DuMond. In March 1937 Surrey moved to Montreal and, in June, was joined by Varley, by then a close friend.

== Career ==
In Montreal Surrey freelanced as a commercial artist and re-established his friendship with Brigden co-worker Fritz Brandtner. He soon established relationships with John Goodwin Lyman, Stanley Cosgrove, Goodridge Roberts, Jean Paul Lemieux, Jean Palardy, Jori Smith, and Jeanne Rhéaume, and became a member of the Eastern Group of Painters. In March 1939 he was hired to assist art director Hazen Sise of the Montreal Standard newspaper and was appointed photo editor shortly thereafter when Sise left to join Dr. Norman Bethune in Spain.

In June Surrey married Bethune's former mistress Margaret Day and exhibited at the New York World's Fair and at the Art Gallery of Toronto (now Art Gallery of Ontario), with André Biéler, Henri Masson and Louis Muhlstock. Later that year, Surrey was a founding member of and frequent exhibitor at the Contemporary Arts Society with Lyman, Brandtner, Roberts, Muhlstock, Paul-Émile Borduas, Prudence Heward, and Marian Dale Scott. In 1941, Surrey was present at the Première exposition des Indépendants with Alfred Pellan, Paul-Émile Borduas, Jori Smith and Goodridge Roberts. His work was also included in the international exhibitions Contemporary Painting in Canada at the Addison Gallery of American Art (Andover MA) in 1942, and Canadian Art 1760 - 1943 at the Yale University Art Gallery in 1944. Turned down as a war artist due to the importance of his work at the Montreal Standard, in 1944 Surrey and reporter Mavis Gallant selected and captioned some of the first Holocaust photographs published in North America.

In 1945 Surrey's first solo exhibition was held at L'Art Français (now Valentin Gallery) in Montreal. He also exhibited at the Montreal Museum of Fine Arts with John Lyman, Eric Goldberg and Goodridge Roberts in 1949, with Louise Landry Gadbois in 1949, and with York Wilson in 1955. A solo exhibition of his work was held at the Musée national des beaux-arts du Québec in 1960. Surrey continued as a photo and features editor at the Montreal Standard and then its successor Weekend magazine until June 23, 1964, when publisher John Wilson McConnell appointed him associate editor so that he could paint full-time. In 1965 and 1967, Surrey's solo shows at Galerie Martin sold out and, by 1970, he was represented by Galerie Gilles Corbeil.

Solo exhibitions of his work were also held at the Musée d'art contemporain de Montréal in 1971 and at the Canadian Cultural Centre in Paris in 1972. His work was included in the group exhibitions Canadian Painting of the Thirties at the Art Gallery of Ontario in 1967, Panorama of Painting in Quebec: 1940 - 1955 in 1967, The Arts of Quebec in 1974 at the Musée d'art contemporain de Montréal, as well as Canadian Painting in the Thirties at the National Gallery of Canada in 1975. From 1965 to 1975 Surrey also taught drawing at Concordia University (Montreal QC). After his retirement from Weekend in 1975, he continued to paint full-time and exhibited in the important group shows Three Generations of Quebec Painting at the Musée d'art contemporain de Montréal in 1976, Major Movements in Twentieth Century Canadian Art at the Edmonton Art Gallery (now Art Gallery of Alberta in 1978, The Contemporary Arts Society: 1939 - 1948 at the Musée d'art contemporain de Montréal in 1981, Modern Art in Quebec 1916 - 1946 at the National Gallery of Canada in 1982, as well as Vancouver Art and Artists: 1931 - 1983 at the Vancouver Art Gallery in 1983.

In 1989 Surrey's vision declined and he stopped painting. He died in Montreal on April 24, 1990. After his death, his work continued to be exhibited in such group shows as the 2001 Brigdens of Winnipeg at the Winnipeg Art Gallery, the 2001 Defining the Portrait and the 2008 This is Montreal! exhibitions at the Leonard & Bina Ellen Art Gallery (Concordia University) in Montreal. In 2004 the Philip Surrey Retrospective Exhibition was held at Galerie Walter Klinkhoff in Montreal. In 2015, biographer T.F. Rigelhof initiated the online newsletter The Artist in the City Project and the Philip Surrey website.

== Recognition and contribution ==
Recognized as a "leading exponent of urban landscape painting in Canada", Surrey's Order of Canada citation read: "His Montreal street scenes convey an emotive vision of the modern city, with its anonymous crowds and individual solitudes. His expressive style and a poetic humanitarianism constitute a unique contribution to Canadian art." In his anthology of Canadian painters from 1930 to 1970, Paul Duval wrote: "No other Canadian artist has painted life in the city with such constancy and authority... with candidness and a highly original outlook." Surrey's early work is compared to Frederick Varley or to Edward Hopper although was described as "rarely as bleak and never as nostalgic nor as repressed". Biographer T.F. Rigelhof also noted the performance aspect in his work and "a mysterious forcefulness that releases the dancers and their viewers into belonging to something greater than our individuated selves." Reviewer Guy Viau compared Surrey to a theatre director: "He studies their goings and comings... as they pass and meet. But not with a judging eye. An eye that feels at one with them. A fraternal eye." Vie des Arts reviewer Giles Daigneault wrote, that for Surrey, "painting exists to console" viewers "through difficult periods of life". Surrey himself wrote: "The only effective outlet for all deeper feelings and thoughts is art."

== Honours ==
Surrey received the Centennial Medal in 1967, an honorary degree from Concordia University in 1981, and was made a member of the Order of Canada in 1982.

== Collections ==
Surrey's work has been collected by the National Gallery of Canada (Ottawa ON), Musée national des beaux-arts du Québec, Ottawa Art Gallery (Firestone Art Collection), and Leonard & Bina Ellen Art Gallery (Concordia University, Montreal). His work is also found in the collections of the Art Gallery of Alberta (Edmonton AB), Art Gallery of Ontario (Toronto ON), Art Gallery of Nova Scotia (Halifax NS), Beaverbrook Art Gallery (Fredericton NB), Musée d'art contemporain de Montréal, Montreal Museum of Fine Arts, Art Gallery of Hamilton, Museum London (London ON), Winnipeg Art Gallery (Manitoba), Art Gallery of Greater Victoria, Vancouver Art Gallery, Musée d'art de Joliette, Sherbrooke Museum of Fine Arts, Owens Art Gallery (Mount Allison University, Sackville NB), and at the Agnes Etherington Art Centre (Queen's University, Kingston ON). Many of his papers are stored at Library and Archives Canada (Ottawa ON).

=== Works at National Gallery of Canada ===
- Going to Work, 1935
- The Red Portrait, 1939
- Plaza Café, c. 1955
- The Young Ladies of the Village (after Courbet), 1966
- Every Canadian Must Fight, c. 1939–1945

== Memberships ==
Surrey was a member of the C.S.G.A., the Eastern Group, and the Contemporary Arts Society. He was also a member of the Royal Canadian Academy of Arts.
