= Louise Landry Gadbois =

Canadian painter (1896–1985)

- Born: 27 November 1896; Montreal, Quebec, Canada
- Died: 10 August 1985 (aged 88); Montreal, Quebec, Canada
- Education: Art Association of Montreal
- Known for: Painting
- Spouse: Émilien Gadbois
- Children: André Gadbois, Hélène Gadbois, Denyse Gadbois, Pierre Gadbois, Philippe Gadbois, Jean Gadbois
- Awards: Macpherson Prize for drawing, Art Association, Montreal, 1935

Louise Landry Gadbois (27 November 1896 – 10 August 1985) was a Canadian painter associated with the Contemporary Arts Society in Montreal. She is known for her portraiture.

== Biography ==
Marie Marguerite Louise Gadbois was born on 27 November 1896 in Montreal, Quebec. She studied painting with Edwin Holgate from 1932 to 1934. Additionally she attended the Art Association of Montreal, studying with John Goodwin Lyman.

In 1941, Gadbois was included in the Première exposition des Indépendants exhibition at Palais Montcalm in Quebec City. This exhibition was organized by Marie-Alain Couturier and included eleven members of the Contemporary Arts Society; Gadbois, Paul-Émile Borduas, Simone Mary Bouchard, Stanley Cosgrove, Eric Goldberg, John Goodwin Lyman, Louis Muhlstock, Alfred Pellan, Goodridge Roberts, Jori Smith, and Philip Surrey. The exhibition traveled to Montreal.

In 1944, Gadbois was in two exhibitions: a joint exhibition with Philip Surrey, and a joint exhibition with her daughter Denyse Gadbois.

Gadbois's portrait of Thérèse Frémont is in the National Gallery of Canada and her portrait The Refugee is in the Musée du Québec.

Gadbois died on 10 August 1985, in Montreal. She was the daughter of Joseph Philippe Landry and the wife of Émilien Gadbois; she had six children.
