= Pegi Nicol MacLeod =

Canadian painter (1904–1949)

- Pegi Nicol MacLeod, 1936
- Born: Margaret Kathleen Nichol; January 17, 1904; Listowel, Ontario
- Died: February 12, 1949 (aged 45); New York, New York
- Known for: Painter
- Spouse: Norman MacLeod (m. 1936)

Pegi Nicol MacLeod (17 January 1904 – 12 February 1949) was a Canadian painter whose modernist self-portraits, figure studies, paintings of children, still lifes and landscapes are characterized by a fluidity of form and vibrant colour. Born Margaret Kathleen Nichol, she was a teacher, war artist and arts activist. In 1936 she became a member of the Canadian Society of Painters in Water Colour and one year later she joined the Canadian Group of Painters.

== Biography ==
She was born in Listowel, Ontario, to William Wallace Nichol and Myrtle Ivy Riggs. Pegi was their only child. The family moved to Ottawa in 1908 when Pegi was four where her father became principal of the Ottawa Technical School. The family lived on Frank Street and Pegi attended elementary at Cartier Street School. In 1914, when war broke out, the family moved to Toronto and Pegi attended Harbord Collegiate Institute. The Nichols returned to Ottawa after the war where Pegi finished her early education at the Ottawa Collegiate Institute.

== Art education ==
In 1921, MacLeod enrolled at the newly re-established Art Association of Ottawa school. She studied art under Franklin Brownell from 1922 to 1923. In 1923, she moved to Montreal to study at the École des Beaux-Arts de Montréal with Edwin Holgate. There was an emphasis on figure study and life drawing at the school. The art critic Donald Buchanan attributed her and many of her classmates' interest in the figure and portraiture to their training at the École. She was at the École des Beaux-Arts de Montréal with Paul-Émile Borduas, Lillian Freiman, Goodridge Roberts, Anne Savage, and Marian Scott, who would all go on to become established artists in their own right. In 1932, she won the Willingdon Arts Competition prize for painting.

== Personal life ==
By 1925, at the age of 21, MacLeod began a five-year relationship with Richard Finnie.

She lived in Toronto from 1934 to 1937 and became good friends with Eric Brown, the first director of the National Gallery of Canada. Through Brown and his wife, Maud, MacLeod developed friendships with artists in Ottawa, Toronto, and Montreal, as well as leading figures of the Canadian cultural and social establishment, including Vincent Massey and his wife, Alice Massey.

She married Norman MacLeod on December 10, 1936, and moved to New York City soon afterward. Although based in New York, she returned annually to Fredericton, New Brunswick. In 1940, she and Lucy Jarvis opened the Observatory Art Centre for aspiring artists at the University of New Brunswick.

== Artistic career ==
A painter of people and landscapes, her artworks tend to reveal a sombre though joyful, reflective and humanitarian insight. In 1927 and 1928, encouraged by ethnographer Marius Barbeau, MacLeod travelled to the west and northwest of Canada. Thanks to Barbeau and to the Canadian Pacific Railway, MacLeod received free transportation on her summer trip. She painted at Morley Station in the foothills of the Rockies and among the Stoney First Nations. During her time in British Columbia MacLeod met artist Emily Carr, whose work exerted an influence on her own. Pegi stayed in Calgary with the F.G. Garbutt family, who were strong supporters of the arts. The Garbutts and MacLeod stayed friends for life. While there, Pegi painted a portrait of Alice Garbutt that demonstrates her increasing use of strong contour lines. MacLeod exhibited two of her portrait studies of the Stoney First Nations in the major exhibition, West Coast Art – Native and Modern organized by the National Gallery of Canada in December 1927. This exhibition was, and has been, much written about and marks the first real effort to include the cultural production of Northwest Coast First Nations within the institutionalization of Canadian art history.

During her travels in 1927, MacLeod is said to have created notebooks and drawings according to her friends. However, nothing is extant to confirm this. The artist also began a draft of a book on her experiences on the west coast. It is possible that MacLeod's mother may have destroyed her book draft since Marian Dale Scott has stated that the artist's mother destroyed much of her early work. MacLeod travelled west again in 1928 to paint in the Upper Skeena River area. She wrote about her travels for the Canadian National Railway Company's magazine and the article marks her first important foray into art writing.

The solo exhibition Portraits, Landscapes and Studies by Pegi Nicol was held in Montreal at the Leonardo Society from February 4–11, 1928, and in the same year she was invited to show with the Group of Seven in Toronto. In the late 1920s, MacLeod moved from Ottawa to Montreal, and then to Toronto, where she worked on window displays for the T. Eaton Company. This position had a strong influence on her art, as demonstrated by her painting A Descent of Lilies (1935). MacLeod was art editor of The Canadian Forum from 1935 to 1936 and helped to establish the Picture Loan Society.

MacLeod was opposed to World War II, though in 1944 she accepted a commission by the National Gallery of Canada to paint many scenes depicting the Women's Division of the Armed Forces as means of showcasing the war from a female perspective.

MacLeod was a person "whose passion, enthusiasm, and activism touched those around her ... it is that quality of engagement that marks her work - immediate, vital pictures, crammed with activity...."

=== Manhattan Cycle ===
Following the Second World War she returned to depicting the scenes of New York City and in 1947 exhibited her oil and water colour paintings in Toronto, Ottawa, and Fredericton under the title "Manhattan Cycle." The Manhattan Cycle, which she called alternatively "Canadian Painter in New York" or "Black Life from a Fifth Floor Window", focused on the people and scenes around MacLeod's apartment on East 88th Street in New York. She wrote to her friend and fellow artist, Marian Scott in 1946 that she had been involved with 88th street for six years and still found it fascinating. The Manhattan Cycle consisted of 110 artworks by 1947 and was the first time MacLeod exhibited a series of works in Canada focused entirely on her time in New York. The Cycle also toured to the Winnipeg School of Art at the request of Joe Plaskett and then on to Saskatoon, Calgary, Edmonton, Victoria, and Vancouver in 1948.

== Selected exhibitions ==
A major retrospective of her work was held at Galerie Walter Klinkhoff in 1982 and a circulating retrospective exhibition was done by the Robert McLaughlin Gallery in Oshawa in 1984, along with a book of her letters and an introduction by Joan Murray. Pegi Nicol MacLeod's work also was included in The Artist Herself: Self-Portraits by Canadian Historical Artists, an exhibition co-curated by Alicia Boutilier and Tobi Bruce who also co-edited the book/catalogue.

== Death ==
MacLeod died of cancer in New York City in 1949, leaving a legacy of more than a thousand works of art that include many paintings and other art forms including designs for hooked rugs. Today MacLeod is a well-regarded artist whose wartime work, which includes more than one hundred oil paintings, sets her apart from many of her contemporaries.

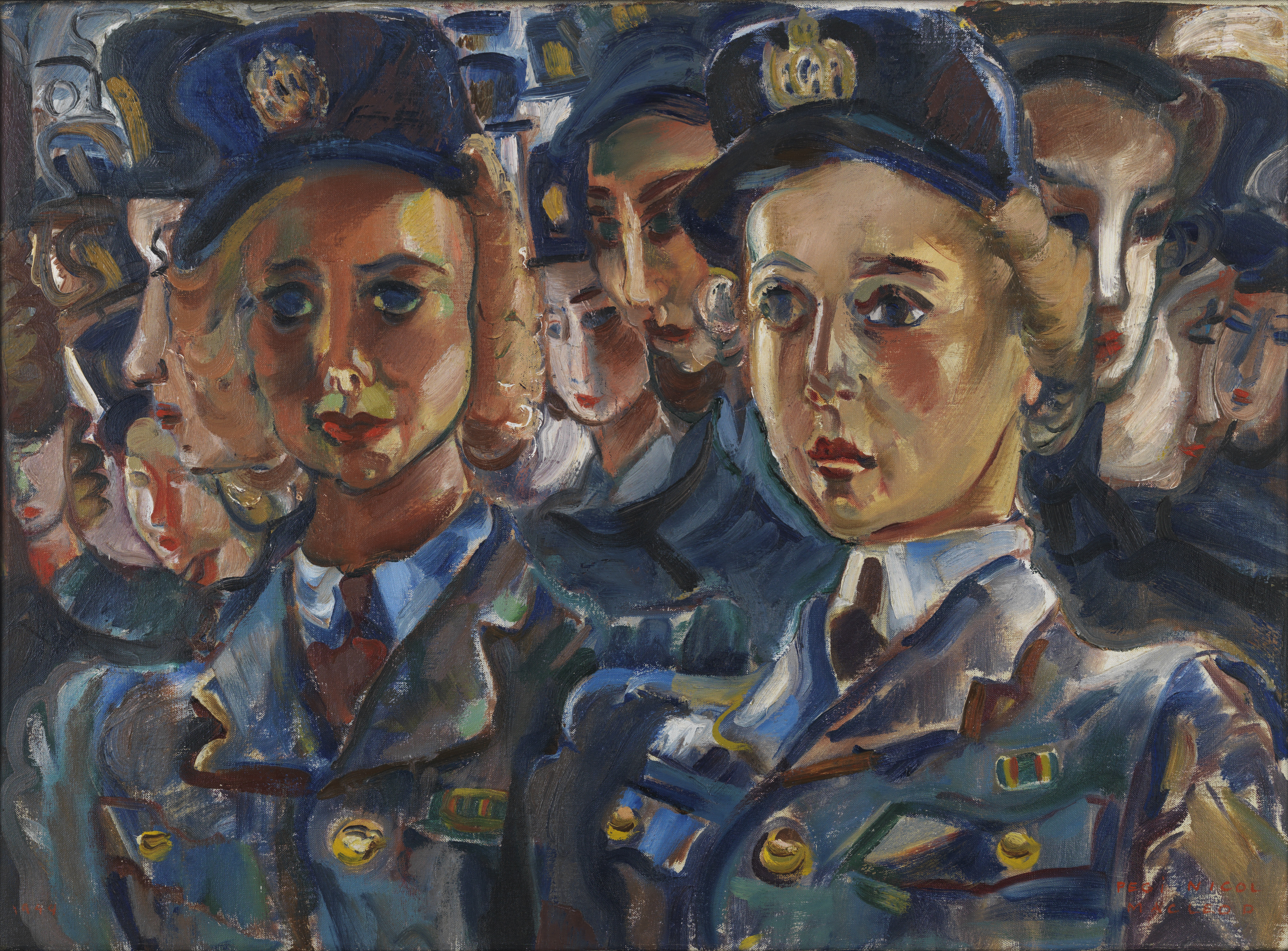
Untitled by Pegi Nicol MacLeod

== See also ==
- Canadian artist
- Woman artists
- Canadian official war artists
- War artist
- War art
