= Eastern Group of Painters =

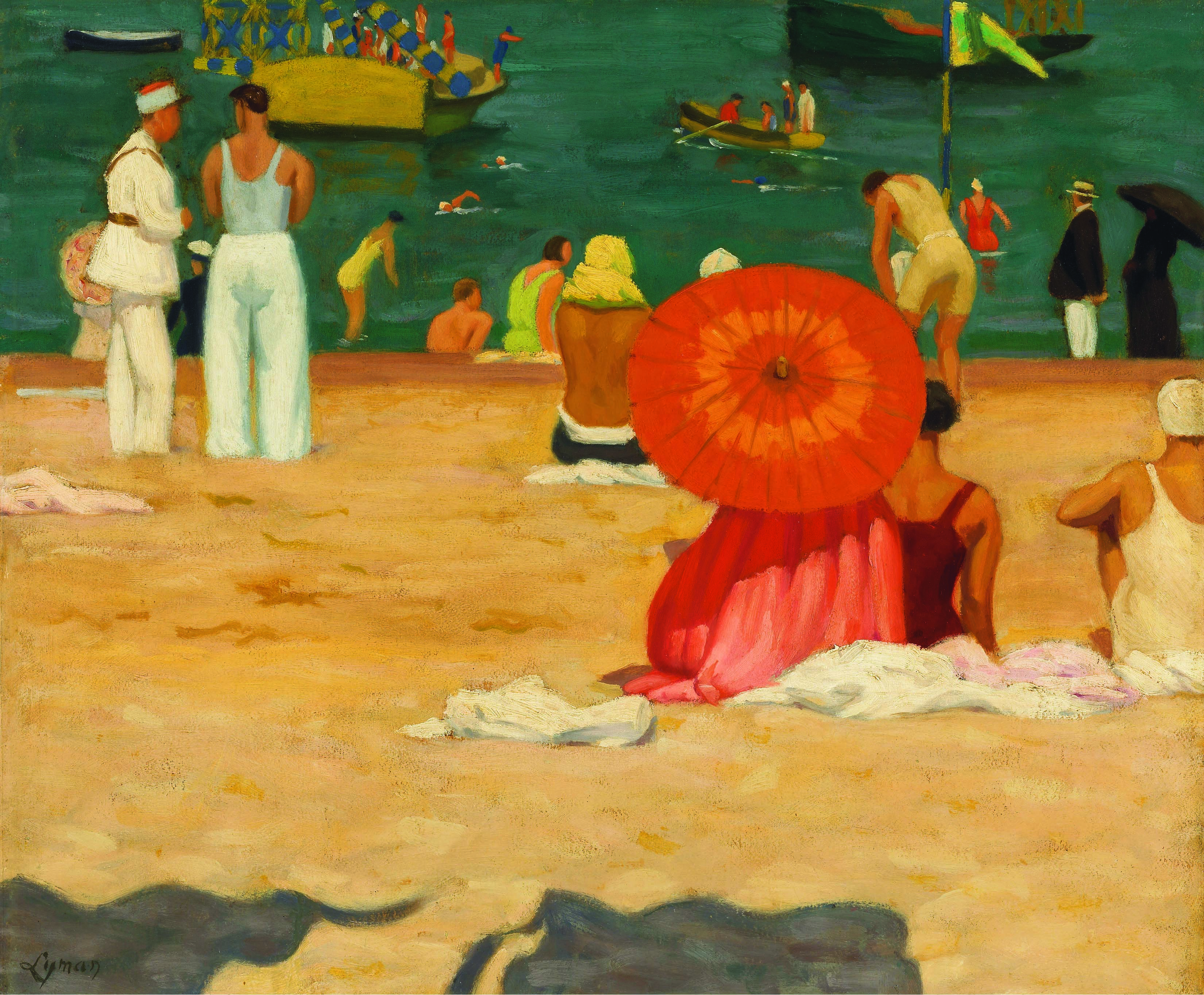
- John Lyman (1886-1967), À la plage (Saint-Jean-de-Luz), Oil on paper, 45.6 x 55.5 x 2.4 cm, National Gallery of Canada, Ottawa
- Formation: 1938
- Type: Artists' collective
- Purpose: Exhibition of modern art
- Location: Montreal, Quebec, Canada
- Region served: Canada
- Members: 6
- Key people: Alexander Bercovitch; Goodridge Roberts; Eric Goldberg; Jack Weldon Humphrey; John Goodwin Lyman; Jori Smith
- Parent organization: Contemporary Arts Society

The Eastern Group of Painters was a group of Canadian artists formed in 1938 in Montreal, Quebec for exhibition purposes and showing together as a group till 1950. It included Montreal artists whose common interest was painting and an art for art's sake aesthetic, not the espousal of a nationalist theory as was the case with the Group of Seven or the Canadian Group of Painters. The group's members included Alexander Bercovitch, Goodridge Roberts, Eric Goldberg, Jack Weldon Humphrey, John Goodwin Lyman, and Jori Smith. In 1939, Jack Humphrey was replaced by Philip Surrey and Bercovitch resigned in 1942.

The group showed their work first with W. Scott and Sons (1938), then at the Art Association of Montreal (1940), the Dominion Gallery (which represented Goldberg and Lyman) (1945), and the Montreal Museum of Fine Arts (1950).

By the late 1930s, many Canadian artists began to resent the hegemony of Group of Seven. The Eastern Group of Painters was formed, as member John Lyman wrote, "to restore the "feel" of life, the savour of things" to Canadian art. What concerned them was being simply painters, said the critic Robert Ayre. who spoke elsewhere of their honesty of purpose. The group had a serious concern with the art of painting and took pleasure in familiar life as a jumping-off place, wrote the same critic. It was an informal fellowship but the members had similarities of views on fundamentals such as an openness to European art. But by 1950 in a show at the Montreal Museum of Fine Arts, the group, now considered a school, was seen to be "conservative with regard for tradition". It showed little that was new, said the Montreal Herald.

John Lyman's Contemporary Arts Society (1939–48) (in French, Société d'art contemporain) evolved from the Eastern Group of Painters.
