= Sandra Paikowsky =

Canadian art historian (born 1945)

- Born: Sandra Roslyn Paikowsky; 29 December 1945; Saint John, New Brunswick
- Education: B.A. Sir George Williams University (now Concordia University), Montreal (1967); M.A. University of Toronto (1969)
- Known for: educator, curator, writer
- Spouse: John Fox (m. 1982)
- Awards: Order of Canada (2015)

Sandra Paikowsky CM (born 29 December 1945) is a Canadian art historian, academic, curator, and writer with a career spanning five decades. In 2015, she received the Order of Canada for her contributions to the development of Canadian art history as a discipline.

== Early years ==
Paikowsky was born in Saint John, New Brunswick. She received her B.A. from Sir George Williams University (now Concordia University), Montreal (1967), and her M.A. from University of Toronto (1969). She lives in Montreal.

== Career ==
Paikowsky began her career in 1969 teaching art history at Concordia University in Montreal. As professor teaching art history there for over 40 years, she helped found the country's first Canadian art history program. In 1981, she also became the Director/Curator at the Concordia Art Gallery (now the Leonard & Bina Ellen Art Gallery), responsible for organizing many exhibitions in a broad range of Canadian art, encompassing modern or contemporary artists, often in mid-career or featuring their Montreal years, and societies and critics in Montreal. She was the co-founder and then the Editor and Publisher of the only peer review devoted to the history and theory of the visual arts in Canada - the "Journal of Canadian Art History"/Annales d’histoire de l'art canadien - for over 35 years (1974 on) with scholarly and informative articles about Canadian art, architecture and the decorative arts. She also was co-editor of the McGill-Queen's University Press/Beaverbrook Canadian Foundation Studies in Art History series.

She taught undergraduate and graduate courses on different aspects of Canadian art. She retired in 2012 as professor emeritus.

She has lectured widely on 20th century Canadian art, both nationally and internationally, and organized conferences on Canadian art, such as "Untold Histories", on art in the Maritime Provinces which was held at the Art Gallery of Nova Scotia as well as creating the first history of the Maritime Art Association with a helpful website. In addition to teaching, she has supervised M.A. and Ph.D. theses in the area of Canadian art history.

== Selected exhibitions ==
Paikowsky organized, co-organized, or contributed essays to exhibitions on the art of Joyce Wieland (1985), Betty Goodwin (1986), Medrie MacPhee (1986), Rita Letendre (1989), and Irene Whittome (1990), and many others as well as on subjects such Quebec abstract painting in such catalogues as Achieving the modern: Canadian abstract painting and design in the 1950s for the Winnipeg Art Gallery in 1993. In 1994, she curated and wrote the catalogue for Nova Scotian Pictures: Painting in Nova Scotia 1940-1966 at the Dalhousie Art Gallery, Halifax. She has curated exhibitions on a broad range of subjects from the L'Association des artistes non figuratifs de Montréal = The Non-Figurative Artists' Association of Montréal (1983) to an exhibition on Robert Ayre: Le critique face à la collection = Robert Ayre: The Critic and the Collection (1992).

In 2010 she curated the exhibition John Fox: Refiguration in Montreal at the McClure Gallery, Visual Arts Centre, Montreal and in 2011 John Fox: Opera su carta in Venice, Italy.

== Writing ==
She has had a long involvement with the "Journal of Canadian Art History". She was its co-founder and then the Editor and Publisher for over 35 years (1974 on). She was the co-editor of the survey book The Visual Arts in Canada: The Twentieth Century (Oxford University Press, 2010), said to succeed as a "useful historiographic case study" and wrote a chapter on modernist representational painting. She is the author of several books on Canadian art and praised for her writing such as the book/catalogue Goodridge Roberts: 1904-1974 (McMichael Canadian Art Collection, 1998) which accompanied the travelling exhibition and James Wilson Morrice: Paintings and Drawings of Venice (2023), the first complete survey of the artist's images of Venice, Italy.

She has written numerous articles on Canadian art for books and journals. Among them are "Constructing an Identity. The 1952 XXVI Biennale di Venezia and The Projection of Canada Abroad", in The Journal of Canadian Art History/Annales d'histoire de l’art canadien, vol.20, 1999; "'From Away' The Carnegie Corporation, Walter Abell and American Strategies for Art in the Maritimes from the 1920s to the 1940s", Journal of Canadian Art History/Annales d’histoire de l’art canadien, vol. 27, 2006; and "The Girls and the Grid: Montreal Women Abstract Painters in the 1950s and Early 60s" in Rethinking Professionalism, Women and Art in Canada 1850-1970 (McGill-Queens University Press, 2012). Recent articles include a Foreword for an exhibition and catalogue of Peter Krausz: photographies = photographs: 1969-2015 (2015).

She has written often on James Wilson Morrice. In 2005 and 2012, she wrote lengthy articles on Morrice and Venice in the Journal of Canadian Art History/Annales d’histoire de l'art canadien, the first titled "James Wilson Morrice. The Campiello delle Ancore" (vol. 26), the second, "James Wilson Morrice at the Rialto Market, Venice" (vol. 33). In 2009, she wrote "James Wilson Morrice's Return from School: A Modernist Image of Quebec Children", in the book Depicting Canada’s Children (Sir Wilfred Laurier University Press, 2009). In 2017, she wrote the chapter on "James Wilson Morrice in Venice. Stones and Water" in Morrice: the A.K. Prakash Collection in trust to the nation by Katerina Atanassova et al. These chapters were called "wonderfully readable essays" in Goodreads.

In 2019, she wrote the chapter on "Canadian artists at the water's edge" in Canada and Impressionism: New Horizons, 1880-1930, the catalogue/book edited by Rosemary Shipton for the National Gallery of Canada exhibition. Her contribution was described as "superbly written".

== Awards and honours ==
- First Distinguished Fellow of the Gail and Stephen Jarislowsky Institute for Studies in Canadian Art at Concordia University, Montreal (1998)
- Order of Canada (2015)
