= John Fox (artist) =

Canadian artist (1927–2008)

- Born: John Richard Fox; July 26, 1927; Montreal, PQ
- Died: June 16, 2008 (aged 80); Venice, Italy
- Education: McGill University (1945-1946), Montreal; MMFA School with Goodridge Roberts (1946-1949), also Montreal; Slade School (1952-1953), London, England
- Known for: painter, sculptor, collagist, watercolourist and draftsman, educator
- Spouse(s): Louise Cass (m. 1951-1975); Sandra Paikowsky (m. 1982)
- Awards: British Council scholarship to study at the Slade School of Fine Art, University of London (1952-1953); Greenshields Memorial Foundation Grant to study abroad (1955-1957)

John Richard Fox (July 26, 1927 – June 16, 2008) was a painter, sculptor, collagist, watercolourist and draftsman, as well as an educator who lived in Montreal most of his life. His work beginning in the late 1950s moved easily from representation to abstraction in 1972 and in 1986, back again to representation. He regarded the two different aspects to his work as having the same concerns. He was often praised as a colorist and for his rich surfaces and subtlety of effects, even in his abstract work. As has been recognized increasingly since the 1990s, Fox’s paintings and particularly his abstractions are a valuable part of Canadian modernism.

== Career ==
Fox was born in Montreal and educated at McGill University in Montreal (1945-1946), then, having decided to be an artist, he attended the School of Art and Design at the Montreal Museum of Fine Arts (MMFA), studying with Goodridge Roberts among others (1946-1949). From Roberts, he learned about colour and how it could be used to structure a painting. It was a lesson which remained with him lifelong.

After working as a teaching assistant to John Lyman at the school, he won a British Council Scholarship to study at the Slade School of Fine Arts (1952-1953), in London. In 1952 he had his first solo show at the MMFA, which was favorably reviewed. While abroad, he travelled widely, making his first trip to Venice, which left him amazed at the beauty of the city. He was awarded The Elizabeth Greenshields Foundation Grant in 1955, the first given and in the same year, the National Gallery of Canada bought his work. He went abroad again and returned to Montreal in 1956. In 1957 he had a solo exhibition at Watson Galleries, in 1959 another with Laing Galleries and then in 1959 Continental Galleries in Montreal became his regular dealer, giving him several solo exhibitions.

He had a second show at the MMFA (1963) and in 1964 he received a major mural commission. In Toronto, he exhibited with Roberts Gallery (1965-1968). In the later 1960s, he began to make bronze sculpture but he had become dissatisfied with representation and from 1972 to 1986 turned to a form of Lyrical abstraction in large canvases. His paintings and collages were influenced by International and American abstract art. They developed and changed over time from abstract impressionism to abstraction with a collage element.

Beginning in 1965, Fox taught at the Saidye Bronfman Centre for the Arts. In 1970, he began to teach at Concordia University where he was made an Associate Professor in the Painting and Drawing Department in 1975 and in 1980 Department Chair. He served as Head until he retired in 1998. During this period, he showed his work with Galerie Marlborough-Godard, Montreal (1973) and Mira Godard Gallery in Toronto (1986). From 1987 until he died in 2008, he turned again to representational painting, reconfigured by his years as an abstract artist. In the 1990s and 2000s, he had many solo exhibitions in Montreal, Toronto, Calgary and Vancouver.

== Work ==
Unlike the Group of Seven whose favorite subject was landscape, Fox was inspired by Modern life and particularly its quieter aspects. It was an insight that pervaded his lifelong definition of art, whether representational or abstract and makes his work important in the map of Canadian modernism.

From the late 1950s to 1972 he preferred to paint interiors, nudes and landscapes, such as he found in artists like Degas and Pierre Bonnard. As an abstract artist, from 1972 to 1986, he modeled his work, though distantly, on artists such as Mark Rothko and Richard Diebenkorn, orchestrating colour to create Lyrical abstractions which have a characteristically rich, distinctive effect. In his large format canvases he used various devices with which to paint such as the spray gun or sponges, cardboard and knives to lay the paint and masking tape and collage. The texture of his paint became thicker with time. At first, his paintings had a kind of almost monochromatic palette, then they became effects of shifting shapes to which he added marks which seem spontaneous, then used collage. In 1983, he began his works using undefined marks in charcoal and proceeded to add oil paint, mapping an allusive landscape or the body. From 1987 until 2008, he returned to representational painting, reinvigorated or as one curator put it "refigured".

Venice meant much to his work in all its aspects, especially its light. Fox went two times in the 1950s (1953 and 1955), once in 1963 and then every year from 1977 on. He was married to Sandra Paikowsky in Venice in 1982 and he died there and his ashes put in the main cemetery. A show of his Venetian work titled John Fox. A Painter in Venice was held at the Beaverbrook Art Gallery in Fredericton in 2025. Venetian frescoes, artists and light inspired Fox in developing his large abstract paintings and Venetian scenes appear in many of his representational paintings, watercolours and drawings.

== Selected exhibitions ==
Fox's solo shows include: MMFA (1952, 1963); Laing Gallery, Tor. (1958); Continental Galleries, Mtl. (1959) (1962) (1963); Galerie Agnès Lefort, Mtl. (1965) (1967); Roberts Gallery, Tor. (1965-1968); Galerie Marlborough-Godard, Mtl. (1973); Sir George Williams Art Galleries, Concordia University, Montreal (Ten New Paintings, 1980-1981, Traveling exhibition to Art Gallery of Windsor; Robert McLaughlin Gallery, Oshawa; Confederation Centre of the Arts, Charlottetown; Gallery Stratford; Beaverbrook Art Gallery, Fredericton; Owens Art Gallery, Sackville, N.B.; Art Gallery, Memorial University, St. Johns, Nfld); Mira Godard Gallery, Tor. (1986); and in the 1990s solo exhibitions in Montreal (Waddington & Gorce, 1991); (Sandra Goldie Gallery, 2007), Toronto, (Mira Godard Gallery, 1990, 1993), Calgary (Paul Kuhn Gallery, 1998, 1999) and Vancouver (Heffel Gallery, Van. (2-artist with Jean McEwen), 1990).

== Selected public collections ==
- National Gallery of Canada, Ottawa;
- Agnes Etherington Art Centre, Queen's University, Kingston ON;
- Art Gallery of Alberta, Edmonton, AB;
- Art Gallery of Greater Victoria;
- Art Gallery of Hamilton, Hamilton ON;
- Art Gallery of Nova Scotia, Halifax, NS;
- Beaverbrook Art Gallery, Fredericton;
- Canada Council Art Bank;
- Confederation Centre Art Gallery & Museum, Charlottetown, PEI;
- Ellen Gallery, Concordia University, Montreal;
- Mackenzie Art Gallery, Regina;
- Montreal Museum of Fine Arts;
- Musée d'art contemporain de Montréal;
- Musée d' art de Joliette, Joliette, QC;
- Musée d'art de Sherbrooke, Sherbrooke QC;
- Musée national des beaux-arts du Québec;
- Museum London, London, Ontario;
- Robert McLaughlin Gallery, Oshawa;
- The Rooms, St. John's, NFLD;
- Vancouver Art Gallery, Vancouver BC;

== Commissions ==
- The Quebec Conference, mural, 1964, Confederation Centre of the Arts, Charlottetown.

== Memberships ==
- Canadian Group of Painters;
- Associate Royal Canadian Academy of Arts;

== Legacy ==
In 2010, the McClure Gallery, Visual Arts Centre in Montreal held an exhibition curated by Sandra Paikowsky of John Fox's paintings titled John Fox: Reconfiguration concerning the artist's return to representation in the mid-1980s after fifteen years of painting abstractions. In the same year, Alan Klinkhoff Gallery in Montreal held a retrospective. Exhibitions followed in 2011 at Winchester Galleries, Victoria, B.C., and the Françoise Calcagno Art Studio in Venice, Italy in a show of Fox's works on paper titled John Fox: Opera su carta. In 2012, a show of Fox's abstract work was held at Battat Contemporary, Montreal with a major catalogue. In 2013, a shows of Fox's work was exhibited at Oeno Gallery, Bloomfield, ON. In 2014, an exhibition was held at Dawson College, Montreal. In 2015, the exhibition at Oeno Gallery had a major catalogue titled John Fox: Abstractions. In 2018, Oeno Gallery in Ontario had an exhibition titled John Fox - A Modernist in Venice. Fox's work wa also shown in John Fox, Works on Paper, Centre d'art E.K.Voland, 2018; John Fox at Produit Rien, May 2022; and included in "The studio as creation, Stories of artists' studios in Quebec" which was guest curated by Laurier Lacroix at the Musée d'art de Joliette in 2023. In 2025, John Fox: A Painter in Venice, curated by John Leroux and Sandra Paikowsky, was exhibited at the Beaverbrook Art Gallery in Fredericton.
