= Eric Goldberg =

Eric Goldberg may refer to:

- Eric Goldberg (artist) (1890–1969), Canadian painter
- Eric Goldberg (animator) (born 1955), American animator and film director
- Eric Goldberg (game designer) (born 1959), American designer of board, role-playing, and computer games
