= Lucy Jarvis =

Lucy Jarvis may refer to:

- Lucy Jarvis (artist) (1896–1985), Canadian artist and educator
- Lucy Jarvis (producer) (1917–2020), American television producer
