= Regina Seiden =

Jewish-Canadian painter

Regina Seiden Goldberg
- Portrait of Regina Seiden, 1928, by Eric Goldberg
- Born: Regina Seiden; 4 July 1897; Rigaud, Quebec
- Died: 11 January 1991 (aged 93); Montreal, Quebec
- Education: Art Association of Montreal, Académie Julian
- Known for: Painter
- Spouse: Eric Goldberg (1928–1969)

Regina Seiden (4 July 1897- 11 January 1991), also known as Regina Seiden Goldberg, was a Jewish Canadian painter who was an early member of the Beaver Hall Group. She was primarily interested in painting figurative work and portraits.

== Biography ==
Seiden was born on 4 July 1897 in Rigaud, Quebec. she moved with her family to Montreal in 1905. Between 1905 and 1912, Seiden attended the French Catholic school Académie Marie-Rose, located in the Plateau neighbourhood of Montreal, where she was encouraged to explore her talents as a painter. Between 1913 and 1918, Seiden attended the Art Association of Montreal where she studied with William Brymner, Edmond Dyonnet and Maurice Cullen. Along with other former students of William Brymner, Seiden joined the Beaver Hall Group and took part in their first exhibit in 1921.

In 1921, Seiden moved to Paris where she studied for a year at the Académie Julian. In 1926, Seiden returned to Paris where she met her husband, fellow artist Eric Goldberg. They got married in 1928 at which point she stopped painting until after his death in 1969. Seiden lived in Montreal and taught art at the couple’s Westmount synagogue for 20 years. She died in 1991.

Her work is included in the collections of the Musée national des beaux-arts du Québec, the National Gallery of Canada and the Robert McLaughlin Gallery, Oshawa.
