= Jeanne Rhéaume =

Canadian artist (1915–2000)

- Born: April 15, 1915; Montreal, Quebec, Canada
- Died: August 12, 2000 (aged 85)
- Known for: Canadian visual artist

Jeanne Leblanc Rhéaume (April 15, 1915 – August 12, 2000) was a Canadian artist.

She was born in Montreal, Quebec, and studied at the École des beaux-arts de Montréal. She went on to study with Lilias Torrance Newton, Harold Beament and Goodridge Roberts at the Art Association of Montreal. She exhibited at various galleries in Montreal. Rhéaume was a signatory to the Prisme d'yeux manifesto. In 1952, she settled in Florence but continued to send canvases to shows in Canada. After studying weaving in Europe, she began showing tapestries as well as paintings in 1972. She received a number of awards and study grants for both painting and weaving over her career. Her work was shown in exhibitions in Canada and abroad.

She died in Montreal at the age of 85.

Her work is included in the collections of the Vancouver Art Gallery, the Art Gallery of Hamilton, the National Gallery of Canada, the Canada Council Art Bank, Global Affairs Canada in Ottawa, the Montreal Museum of Fine Arts, the Musée national des beaux-arts du Québec and the Maison du Québec in Paris.
