= David Milne (artist) =

Canadian painter, printmaker, and writer

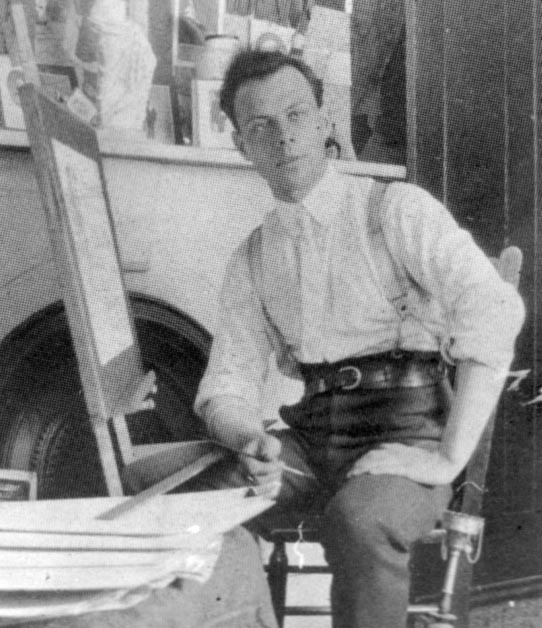
- Milne in his New York City studio, 1909
- Born: David Brown Milne; January 8, 1882; Burgoyne, Ontario, Canada
- Died: December 26, 1953 (aged 71); Bancroft, Ontario, Canada
- Education: Art Students League of New York
- Known for: Painter
- Partner(s): Frances May (Patsy) (m. 1912); Kathleen Pavey

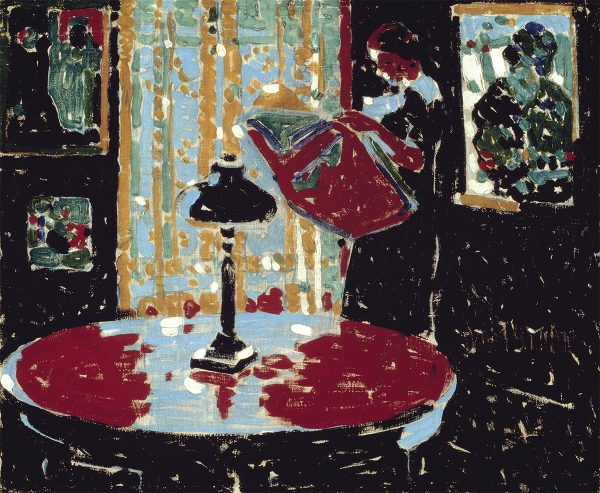
Black, 1914

David Milne (January 8, 1882 – December 26, 1953) was a Canadian painter, printmaker, and writer. He is sometimes referred to as the Master of Absence and known for his ability to reduce a painting to its bare essentials.

== Biography ==
David Milne was born near Paisley in 1882. He was the last of 10 children born to Scottish immigrant parents. His early education was in Paisley, followed by high school in Walkerton; he performed well in school and soon after graduation began teaching in a country school near Paisley. During 1902 and 1903, he studied art through correspondence, eventually deciding to move to New York City in 1903 at the age of 21.

In New York, he spent two years (and a third year of night school) studying at the Art Students League. He came to know both American and European Impressionism, Post Impressionism, and Fauvism, modern approaches that helped shape his own style. A significant measure of this early success was his participation in two of North America's most important exhibitions of art of the early 20th century: the famous Armory Show in 1913 (seen in New York, Boston, and Chicago) where he had five paintings exhibited and the Panama-Pacific International Exposition held in San Francisco in 1915. He was represented by the N. E. Montross Gallery (the same gallery showed 'The Eight' or Ashcan School artists).

In 1912, he married Frances May (known as Patsy) and later they moved to Boston Corners, a small hamlet where Milne painted with oils and watercolours. Milne left Boston Corners in 1917 for basic training in Toronto for World War I. He was stationed in Quebec and then quarantined in England for a month, during which time World War I ended. Because of his background as an artist, he was asked to complete paintings and drawings as a war artist. Milne produced artworks of battlefields in France and Belgium as well as of soldiers in Kinmel Park Camp in England.

Between the years of 1919 and 1929, Milne lived in Boston Corners and the surrounding areas, focusing his artistic work on the landscape. He spent the winter of 1923–1924 in Ottawa in hopes of finding government patronage and a position. During his six months in the city, Milne produced several paintings and watercolours. Six of his works were purchased by the National Gallery of Canada. However, Milne was unable to secure a job in the federal government and returned to Upper New York State. In 1929, Milne returned to Canada to paint in Temagami, Weston and Palgrave. He separated from his wife in 1933, moved to Port Severn, Ontario, and sold many of his paintings to prominent art patrons Vincent Massey and Alice Massey. In the late 1930s, Milne settled down in Uxbridge, Ontario, with Kathleen Pavey, a nurse, and the two had a son (also David) in 1941. During the later years of his life, Milne worked again in watercolours, and changed his subject matter to more whimsical, fantasy and childlike inspirations. He continued to travel to Algonquin Park and Baptiste Lake to paint the Canadian landscape.

On November 14, 1952, Milne had a stroke. Over the next year he continued to suffer from small strokes and died in the hospital in Bancroft, Ontario, on December 26, 1953.

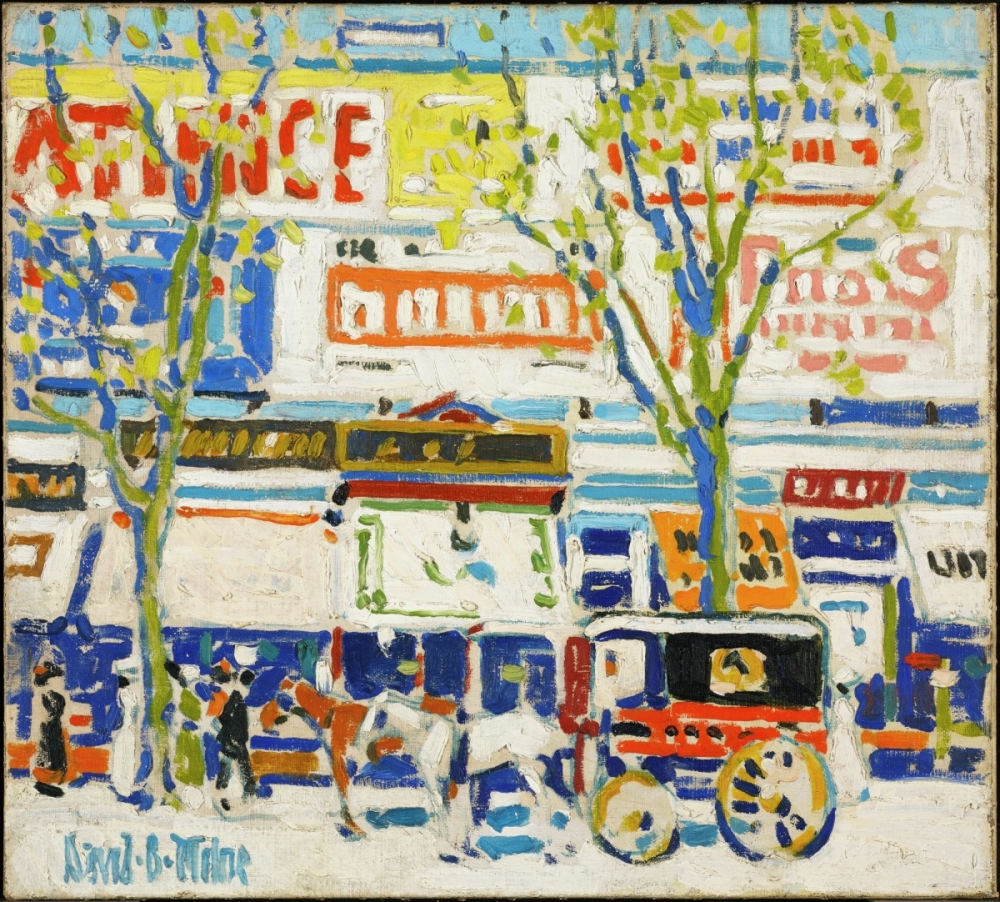
Billboards, c. 1912

== Art and technique ==
David Milne worked predominantly in oil paint, watercolour and drypoint printmaking. Like the Group of Seven, Milne primarily chose landscape as his subject matter; however, his approach to this subject was considerably less "impressionistic" than the Group's and had a more "modernist" feel. Milne was influenced in part by the European and American modernists exhibited through Alfred Stieglitz's gallery, 291. He also pushed himself to develop his own particular style that was stark yet beautiful and very expressively realized.

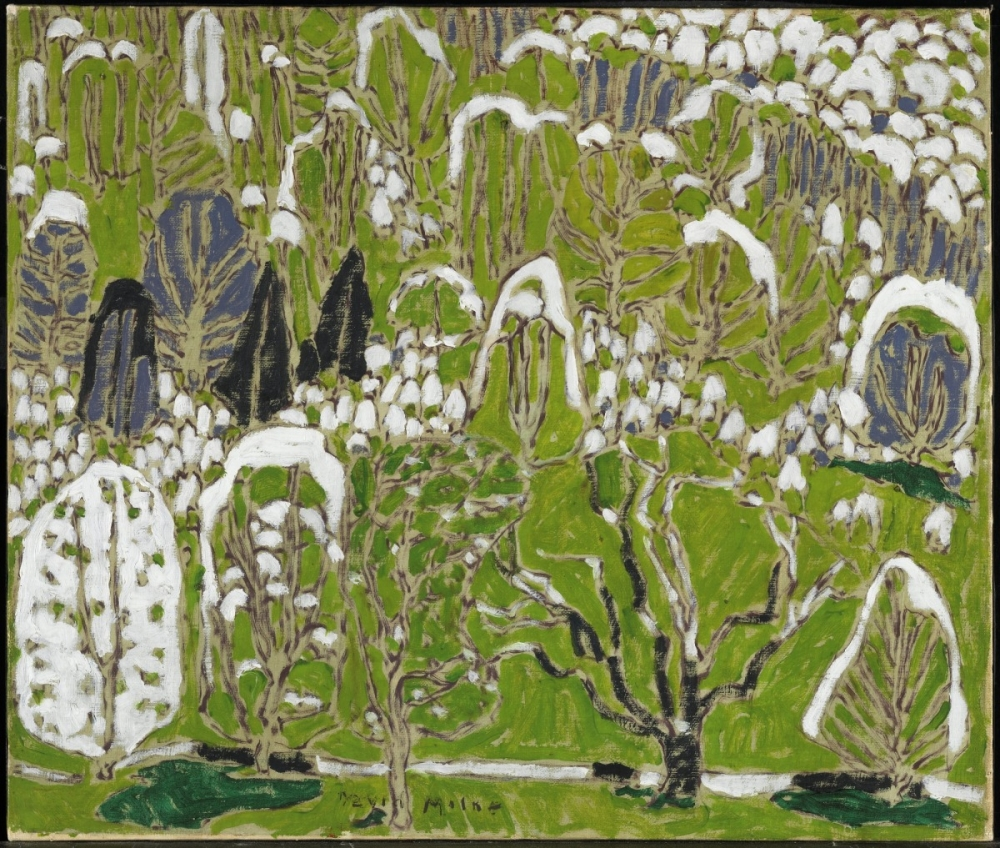
Trees in Spring, c. 1917

Milne chose simple, ordinary subjects which he imbued with dignity and significance. His landscapes and still lifes reveal a decorative sense and fluidity of touch. His frequent use of black in his paintings is a characteristic trait. Often one type of object, trees for example, would be depicted in black in one part of the image and white in another creating an intriguing internal tension in the work. For Milne, white was an extension of the palette – a way to express the stillness of the landscape he was viewing. In both his watercolour and oil painting techniques, Milne was experimental in his approach. He paid careful attention to composition but also to the qualities of line, colour and texture that were revealed in his work.

James Clark, a friend, supporter and patron of Milne's, sent him an etching press while he was at Boston Corners in 1926, and Milne was able to experiment with printmaking in new and unusual ways. He developed a method of making colour drypoints, printing one colour over another with different plates for each. Milne had first tried etching and drypoint while he was a student at the Art Students’ League and his idea of colour drypoint was unprecedented, as the tradition was to only use black and the white of the paper. He had thought of creating colour drypoints years before, but lacked the equipment to carry through his experiments, as the printmaking technique requires metal plates which are scratched or etched into, then inked, wiped and finally run through a printing press. It took many months for Milne to achieve the sparsely layered look that he envisioned with his prints, but the results were very compelling.

In his later years Milne began to experiment with content far removed from the simple, albeit highly original, landscapes that make up the better part of his oeuvre. Although he had espoused a pure aestheticism in his younger years (insisting that a painting's content was merely secondary) he went on to produce a number of works that invite an allegorical interpretation. The canvas left on his easel at the time of his death showed a group of angels childishly amusing themselves with cosmetics purchased from a wandering salesman.

== Recognition and legacy ==
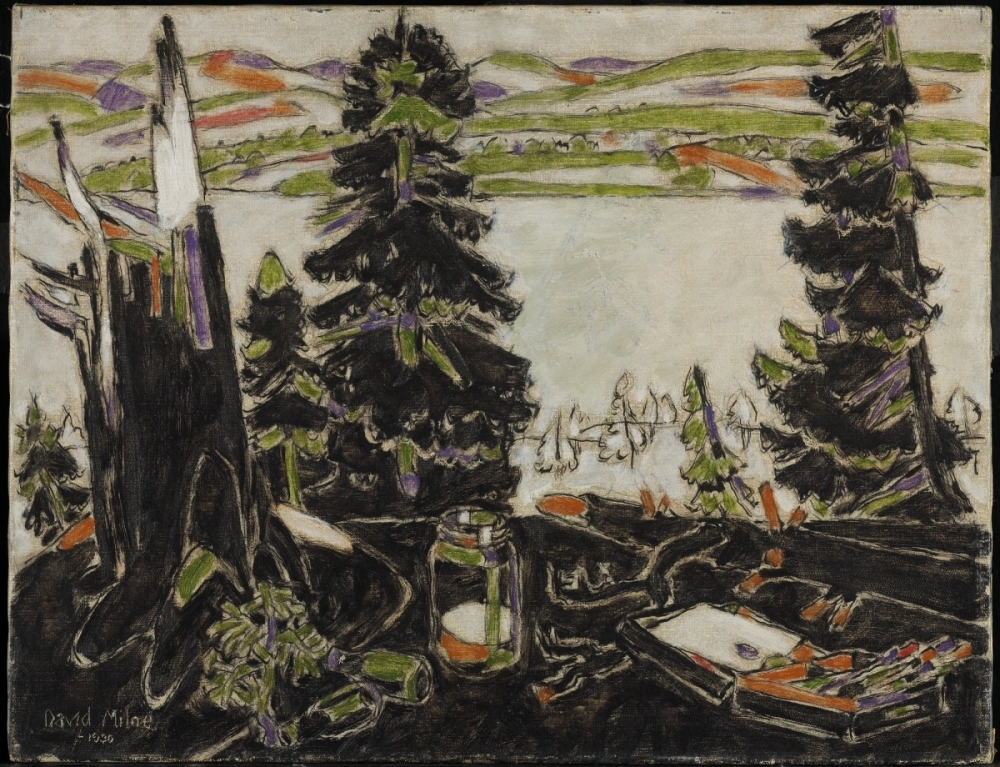
Painting Place III, 1930

Milne began to achieve real success after Toronto-based Douglas Duncan became his dealer in 1938. The American art critic Clement Greenberg described Milne as one of the three greatest North American artists of his generation. Although he was overshadowed by the Group of Seven during his early career, Milne is now recognized as one of Canada's foremost artists. After his death, the National Gallery of Canada organized a retrospective exhibition of his work (1955–1956), and then another retrospective was shown in Toronto at Hart House in 1962. In 2005, an exhibit of Milne's watercolours, David Milne Watercolors: "Painting Toward the Light", traveled from the British Museum to the Metropolitan Museum of Art in New York and then to the Art Gallery of Ontario.

In 1952, works by Milne along with those of Emily Carr, Goodridge Roberts and Alfred Pellan represented Canada at the Venice Biennale.

In June 1992, Canada Post issued 'Red Nasturtiums, David B. Milne, 1937' in the Masterpieces of Canadian art series. The stamp was designed by Pierre-Yves Pelletier based on a painting in the National Gallery of Canada, Ottawa, Ontario.

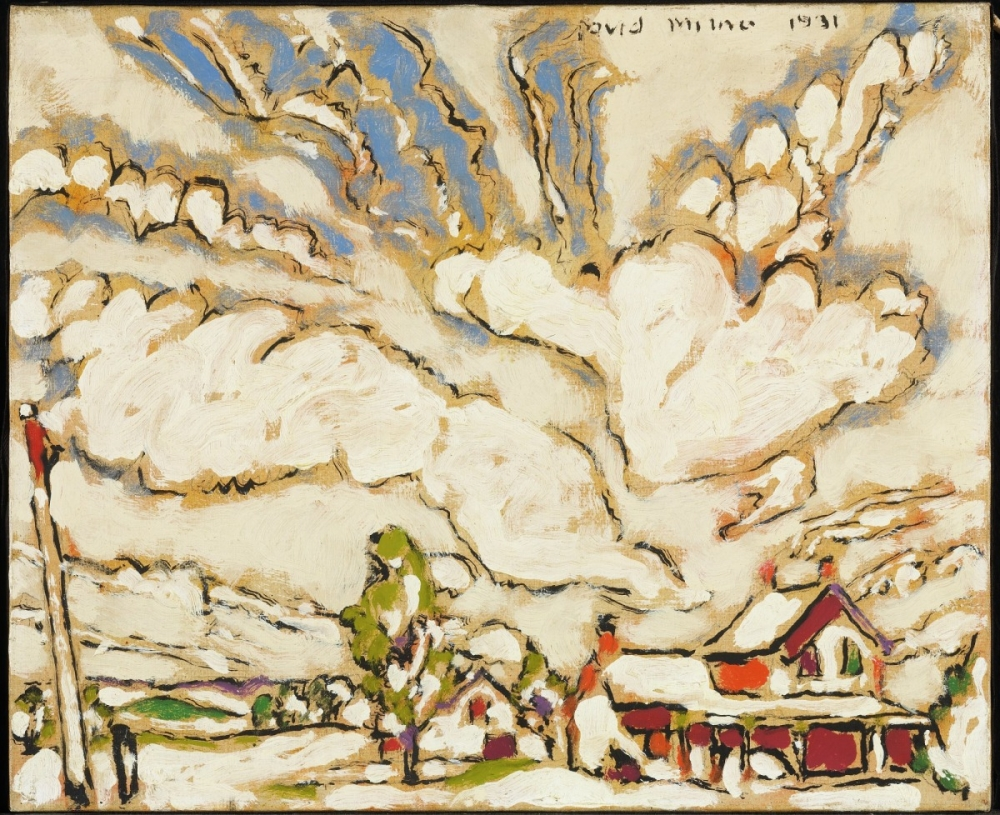
Ollie Matson's House Is Just a Square Red Cloud, 1931

In a 2018 exhibition of his work at London's Dulwich Picture Gallery, the critic Jonathan Jones rated it one star out of five, "very little sign of development ... embarrassingly repetitive." Art critic Mark Hudson gave it 4 stars out of 5 and wrote, "I’d rather have minor art like this, that takes you somewhere you’ve never been and from an intensely personal perspective, than much of the repetitive, conventionally "challenging" work served up as major by larger galleries." Florence Hallett writing in The Economist said, "The strikingly original Canadian used paint sparingly but to dramatic effect."

== Quotations ==
"...the usual way is to brush in the picture broadly, in masses, coming to your more detailed line last....[My} method is the opposite. All line is put in detail first...".

== Record sale prices ==
At the Cowley Abbott Auction of An Important Private Collection of Canadian Art – Part III, December 6, 2023, Lot #119 Milne's Outlet of the Pond, Late Afternoon, 1926, oil on canvas, 18.25 x 22 ins ( 46.4 x 55.9 cms ), Auction Estimate: $70,000.00 - $90,000.00, realized a price of $528,000.00.

== See also ==
- Canadian official war artists
- War artist
- War art
