= Donald W. Buchanan =

Canadian art historian (1908-1966)

- Born: April 9, 1908; Lethbridge, Alberta, Canada
- Died: February 28, 1966 (aged 57); Ottawa, Canada
- Known for: art historian, arts administrator, and author

Donald William Buchanan (1908–1966) was a Canadian art historian, arts administrator, and author.

== Career ==
Donald Buchanan was born in 1908 in Lethbridge, Alberta, to Senator William Ashbury Buchanan and Alma Maud Buchanan (née Freeman). He studied modern history at the University of Toronto and later attended the University of Oxford. In 1934, he received a fellowship from the Carnegie Corporation to train in museum administration and to complete a biography on the Canadian artist James Wilson Morrice (1865–1924). The following year, Buchanan founded the National Film Society of Canada, and in 1937 he joined the Canadian Radio Commission. In 1940, Buchanan moved on to the National Film Board, where he established the Stills Photography Division.

During the 1940s and 1950s, Buchanan also acted as co-editor of the Canadian Art journal and as director of the Association of Canadian Industrial Designers. In 1945, he advocated for a greater design quality in Canada after criticizing the mediocrity of its furniture design. He encouraged Canadian craftsmen and manufacturers to ditch tradition and to develop an aesthetic more akin to that of Scandinavia, instead.

In 1947, he joined the National Gallery of Canada, where he served as director of the Industrial Design Division which had just been established. From 1955 to 1960, he served as the Gallery's Associate Director.

In 1958, Buchanan developed an interest in photography and took a six-month leave of absence, travelling to France, Italy, Greece, Turkey, and Jordan in order to pursue his artistic practice. From 1960 to 1963, he would go on to exhibit his photographic work at the Here and Now Gallery (Toronto), La Galleria George Lester (Rome), and The Blue Barn Gallery (Ottawa). In December 1963, he was appointed director of the International Fine Arts Exhibition Man and His World at Expo '67.

Buchanan died in Ottawa in 1966 after being struck by a van.

== Selected publications ==
- James Wilson Morrice: A Biography (1936)
- Canadian Painting from Paul Kane to the Group of Seven (1945)
- Design for Use (1947)
- The Growth of Canadian Painting (1950)
- Alfred Pellan (1962)
- A Nostalgic View of Canada (1962)
- Sausages and Roses (1963)
