= Fritz Brandtner =

Canadian painter

- Born: Friedrich Wilhelm Brandtner; 28 July 1896; Danzig, Prussia
- Died: 7 November 1969 (aged 73)
- Education: largely self-taught and in Danzig with Franz August Pfuhie at the University of Danzig
- Movement: German Expressionism, modernism
- Spouse: Mieze Preuss (m. 1929)
- Awards: Jessie Dow Award (1946); Canada Council Visual Arts Award (1968)
- Elected: C.S.P.W.C.; C.G.P.; C.S.G.A.; F.C.A.

Friedrich Wilhelm Brandtner (28 July 1896 – 7 November 1969), known during his life as Fritz Brandtner, was a German-born Canadian artist and art instructor. During his career he worked variously as painter, printmaker, graphic artist, illustrator, muralist, and set designer.

== Biography ==
Brandtner was born in Danzig and educated as a student with F. A. Pfuhle at the University of Danzig. He became his assistant, then emigrated to Canada from Germany in 1928. Following a short stay in Winnipeg he settled in Montreal in 1934. He was a member of the Contemporary Arts Society in Montreal, serving as its first secretary. He was also a passionate art-educator, teaching classes with Canadian painter Marian Dale Scott. Brandtner introduced notions of the German Expressionists to Canada, especially the works of Bauhaus. Later, he introduced abstraction into his practice.

In 1936, together with Norman Bethune, George Holt, Elizabeth Frost, André Charles Biéler and Hazen Sise, he founded the Children's Art Centre in Montreal. The centre offered free art classes to local children. In 1937, Charles Goldhamer took Brandtner and painter Caven Atkins to paint in the hills north of Baie St. Paul, an early introduction for Brandtner to the north shore of the St. Lawrence. His work was also part of the painting event in the art competition at the 1948 Summer Olympics.

Brandtner died in Montreal on 7 November 1969. A close friend of Brandtner, Montreal art dealer Paul Kastel, of the Kastel Gallery, was named executor of Brandtner's estate. Kastel continued to promote Brandtner's work over the following four decades. In 2011, Galerie Valentin in Montreal held a retrospective exhibition of Brandtner's works. The Fritz Brandtner library and art collection is part of the Library and Archives of the National Gallery of Canada.
