= Denyse Gadbois =

Canadian artist (1921–2013)

- Born: 1921; Montreal
- Died: 2013 (aged 91–92); Pointe Claire, Quebec
- Known for: Painter, muralist and sculptor

Denyse Gadbois (1921 – 2013) was a Canadian artist and professor who worked in painting, mural art and sculpture.

== Career ==
Gadbois was born in Montreal and studied at the Montreal Museum of Fine Arts (1944) with Goodridge Roberts and then in Paris at the Académie Julian. She returned to Canada and in 1945 won a prize for figure painting at the Quebec Provincial Competition. In 1947, she exhibited Girl in Blue at the Riverside Museum, New York in a show entitled "Exhibition of Canadian Women Painters".

Besides painting, she created a series of large murals for the Dominion Textile Company. Her work is included in the collections of the Musée national des beaux-arts du Québec and the Art Gallery of Greater Victoria
