= Stanley Cosgrove =

Canadian artist (1911-2002)

- Born: Stanley Morel Cosgrove; 23 December 1911; Montreal, Quebec
- Died: 28 May 2002 (aged 90); Montreal, Quebec
- Education: École des Beaux-Arts, Montreal (1929-1935), studying with Henri Charpentier, Joseph Saint-Charles, Charles Maillard; Art Association of Montreal with Edwin Holgate (1936-1938); Academia de San Carlos, Mexico City (1940)
- Awards: Government fellowship to study in France
- Elected: Full member, Royal Canadian Academy of Arts (1967)

Stanley Cosgrove RCA (23 December 1911 – 28 April 2002) was a Canadian painter, draughtsperson and muralist. His landscapes are praised for their serenity.

== Career ==
Stanley Morel Cosgrove was born in Montreal, Quebec. He studied at the École des beaux-arts in Montreal (1928–1935), and attended the Art Association of Montreal studying with Edwin Holgate (1936). In around 1937, he painted in the Gaspé and Charlevoix regions of Quebec along with Jean Paul Lemieux, Jean Palardy and Jori Smith. In 1938, he assisted Holgate in painting a mural for the Canadian pavilion at the New York World's Fair in 1939.

In 1939, Cosgrove had his first solo show at the École des beaux-arts de Québec, and also exhibited with the Contemporary Arts Society and the Musée du Québec. He received a scholarship from the Province of Quebec in the earlier part of the year and meant to study in France for four years but the outbreak of the Second World War made him choose New York. At the end of 1939, Cosgrove arrived in New York with his wife but after two months, went to Mexico, where he studied at the Academia de San Carlos, Mexico City (1940) and served as an apprentice to José Clemente Orozco (1940–1944), who had just begun a fresco for the Hospital Jesus de Nazareno in Mexico City. From him, Cosgrove learned fresco techniques, among them the use of thin, dry layers of paint.

Orozco himself had learned fresco painting from Italian encyclopedias and advised Cosgrove to go to the Italians for further knowledge of his medium. Cosgrove stayed with Orozco until the completion of the fresco. It was from working with Orozco that Cosgrove felt a new confidence in his work. During his four years in Mexico, he also did still lifes, landscapes, street and market scenes. Upon his return to Canada in 1943, he worked part-time teaching at the École des beaux-arts in Montreal, and in the following years participated in numerous exhibitions. He was exclusively represented by Dominion Gallery, Montreal; joined the Canadian Group of Painters; and in 1951 was elected to full membership in the Royal Canadian Academy of Arts. In 1952, he taught at Queen’s University at Kingston, Ontario.

He received a Canadian Government scholarship in 1953 to study in France (1953–1954) and traveled to France and Spain with Goodridge Roberts who was also on a government fellowship to study and paint. He was active about 1953 in the field of textile designing, working with a group of artists which included Robert Lapalme, Paul-Émile Borduas, Maurice Raymond and F.C.A. Sullivan. He had developed the interest in modern fresco painting in Canada, particularly in churches, and he conducted classes in this medium at the École des Beaux Arts. He completed a fresco for the entrance of the philosophy and science wing of the College de Saint Laurent near Montreal. In 1962, he moved to La Tuque in north-central Quebec for five years, followed by Coaticook for three years, before returning to Montreal in 1970.

In 1985, he retired from teaching to devote his full attention to painting. His works centered on the human figure, still life and landscape, and he is particularly known for his paintings of trees, which the artist stated he regarded as so many elements of composition. He held solo shows at the Continental and Laing Galleries. Cosgrove is represented in the collections of the National Gallery of Canada, the Art Gallery of Ontario, the Art Gallery of Greater Victoria, the Ottawa Art Gallery, the Art Museum at the University of Toronto - Justina M. Barnicke Gallery, the Musée national des beaux-arts du Québec, the Vancouver Art Gallery, and the Museum of Modern Art, New York, among others. He died in 2002 in Montreal.

There is a 1953 interview with Cosgrove in Queens University Archives. An exhibition of his work was held in the Exhibition Center in Baie-Saint-Paul in 1995.
