= Robert Ayre =

Canadian art critic, author (1900-1980)

- Born: Robert Hugh Ayre; 3 April 1900; Napinka, Manitoba
- Died: 23 December 1980 (aged 80); Montreal, Quebec
- Known for: art critic, editor, journalist, author
- Spouse: Thelma Ayre
- Awards: LL. D.

Robert Hugh Ayre LL. D. (April 3, 1900 – December 23, 1980) was a pioneering art critic for the Montreal Star who wrote about Canadian art for 20 years (1950–1970) and an author of juvenile fiction inspired by legends of the First Nations.

== Career ==
Ayre was born in Napinka in rural Manitoba and grew up there. In 1920, he got a job as a cub-reporter for the Winnipeg Telegram. In 1924, he moved to a job at the Winnipeg Free Press. In 1927, he got a job in the Publicity Department of the Canadian National Railway (CNR) in Winnipeg and from then on was assured of financial stability.

He began to write free-lance for the Canadian Forum magazine from 1928 on. He also wrote articles for the Queen's Quarterly. From 1932 to 1934, he became editor of the CNR Magazine and met Lawren Harris and through him, other members of the Group of Seven. He moved to Montreal in 1934 and while working for the CNR, began writing for the Montreal Gazette.

In Ayre's capacity as a journalist, he attended the Kingston Conference in 1941, and helped found the Federation of Canadian Artists, and having moved back to Winnipeg in 1942, working for the CNR's Trans-Canada Air Lines, became Chairman for the Federation, Manitoba Region from 1942 to 1943. In 1944, he moved back to Montreal and besides his regular job at the CNR, lectured on radio and at McGill University's Extension department on Canadian art.

He became the editor of Canadian Art in 1944 and until 1959, served in that capacity, co-editing with Donald W. Buchanan, the editor-in-chief. From 1950 to 1970, he was the art editor of the Montreal Star, retiring in 1970, having published almost 2,000 articles on Canadian art. He was a founding member of the Canadian chapter of the International Art Critics Association (AICA Canada), established in 1955. J. Russell Harper said of him in 1976:

I suspect that he has seen more Canadian paintings than any other single individual. In looking, and in writing about what he sees, he has demonstrated enlightenment in the finest humanitarian tradition.

Ayre also wrote a number of short stories and is the author of Sketco the Raven (1961), based on West Coast First Nation legends. His fonds is at Queens University, Kingston, Ontario.

== Awards and honours ==
- Canada Drama Award (1942);
- Concordia University, Montreal, Honorary Doctorate (LL. D.);
