= Jack Humphrey =

Canadian painter

Jack Weldon Humphrey
- Born: January 12, 1901; Saint John, New Brunswick
- Died: 23 March 1967 (aged 66); Saint John, New Brunswick
- Known for: Painter
- Spouse: Jean Elizabeth Fowler (m. 1942)

Jack Weldon Humphrey (12 January 1901 – 23 March 1967) was a Canadian landscape and figure painter, mainly in watercolour. Art historian J. Russell Harper called him the "most significant eastern Canadian painter of his generation".

== Biography ==
Humphrey was born in Saint John, New Brunswick. He studied at the school of the Boston Museum of Fine Arts, with Philip Hale and with Charles Webster Hawthorne at the National Academy of Design (1924-1929) and the Art Students League, New York, as well as at Charles Hawthorne's Cape Cod School of Art. He was a Tiffany Foundation student at Oyster Bay, Long Island, 1927. He travelled to Europe from 1929 to 1930, studying in Paris with André Lhote and at the Académie de la Grande Chaumière, and in Munich at the Hans Hofmann school. He also travelled in Italy, Holland, Belgium, and England. He visited Vancouver in 1933 and Mexico in 1938.

Humphrey was a founding member of the Canadian Group of Painters (C.G.P.) in 1933, the Eastern Group (1938) which evolved into the Contemporary Arts Society, the Canadian Society of Painters in Water Colour (Director, 1944; Vice-President, 1945); and the Canadian Society of Graphic Art (Regional Representative, 1946; Eastern Vice-President, 1951; Regional Representative, 1956, 1959). In 1951, he taught at Queen's University in Kingston, Ontario. That year, he received a Doctor of Laws from the University of New Brunswick. From 1952 to 1954, he painted in Paris on a Canadian Government-Royal Society Overseas Fellowship. Returning from France in 1954, he experimented with painted more abstractly in his gouache and oil landscapes, while his watercolours focused on the intimate details of nature. He received a Canada Council Senior Arts Fellowship in 1960. In 1966-1967, a retrospective exhibition of his work was organized by Stuart A. Smith for the Beaverbrook Art Gallery, Fredericton, N.B. that toured through Canada, circulated by the National Gallery of Canada.

Humphrey's paintings of the harbour, streets and workers of Saint John in Canada established his reputation as an artist and his work extended to numerous portraits of friends and the city's children. Humphrey's approach made him a respected member of Montreal's Contemporary Arts Society and the Canadian Group of Painters.

He died of a heart attack on 23 March 1967 in hospital at Saint John, New Brunswick. He had been recovering from a recent surgery. His papers are in the National Gallery of Canada Library and Archives Jack Humphrey fonds.
