= Palardy =

Palardy is a surname. Notable people with the surname include:

- Jean Palardy (1905–1991), French-Canadian painter, art historian, ethnologist, and filmmaker
- Justin Palardy (born 1988), Canadian football player
- Michael Palardy (born 1992), American football player
