= Lucy Jarvis (artist) =

Canadian painter and educator

- Born: Lucy Mary Hope Jarvis; July 27, 1896; Toronto, Ontario
- Died: May 24, 1985 (aged 88); Yarmouth, Nova Scotia
- Education: Havergal Ladies College, Canada; Boston Museum of Fine Arts, USA
- Known for: painter, educator
- Partner: Helen Weld

Lucy Mary Hope Jarvis (July 27, 1896 – May 24, 1985) was a Canadian painter, educator, and modernist. She acted as a catalyst to the arts in New Brunswick.

== Life and career ==
The daughter of Edward William Jarvis and Kate Agnes Harris, she was born in Toronto and grew up in Yarmouth, Pembroke Shore (Nova Scotia), Fredericton and southwestern Ontario. Jarvis studied art at Havergal Ladies College and at the art school of the Boston Museum of Fine Arts, where she became committed to social realism.

She taught at Kings Hall in Compton, Quebec and at the Provincial Normal School in Fredericton. From 1935 to 1936, she worked as a cataloguer and draftsman for the Royal Ontario Museum. While in Fredericton in 1940, Jarvis, along with Pegi Nicol MacLeod and Margaret MacKenzie, wife of University of New Brunswick president Norman MacKenzie, worked to establish an art centre in the university's long-unused William Brydone Jack Observatory. Today, it is still in existence as the UNB Art Centre.

In 1941, Jarvis and MacLeod publicized the Centre, describing their work teaching there, Jarvis for the first issue of Maritime Art magazine, MacLeod in a letter to Harry McCurry, the director of the National Gallery of Canada. MacLeod ran the summer school at the Observatory Art Centre for eight years (1941-1948), but Jarvis ran the UNB Art Centre for 20 years, as full-time director from 1946, retiring in 1960. Her vision and efforts shaped the character of the Centre.

From 1942 to 1944, Jarvis also showed films in rural New Brunswick for the National Film Board War Information Service. From 1946 to 1960, she was director of the art department at the University of New Brunswick. She left the Art Centre in June 1960. The same year she received funding from the Canada Council which allowed her to travel and study in Europe. She studied with André Lhote in Paris and in 1961 attended Oskar Kokoschka's International School of Seeing in Salzburg before returning to Canada. Her studies in France turned her into a modernist.

In 1961, she established a studio at Pembroke Dyke. Jarvis died there at the age of 88.

Her work is included in the collections of the University of New Brunswick, the Beaverbrook Art Gallery, the New Brunswick Museum, the University of Toronto and the National Gallery of Canada. Jarvis worked in pastels, watercolours and oil.

== Legacy ==
The Beaverbrook Art Gallery included Jarvis in a show of Canadian Women Modernists in 2024.

== Personal life ==
Jarvis met Helen Weld in 1925 at the Boston Museum School. They were together much of the rest of their lives.
