= Contemporary Arts Society =

The Contemporary Arts Society was founded by John Lyman in 1939 to promote modern art in Montreal, at a time when Canada was dominated by academic art. Lyman was the Society's first president. The additional officers were vice-president Paul-Émile Borduas, secretary Fritz Brandtner, and treasurer Philip Surrey. The Society lasted until 1948.

== Early membership ==
Early members included Alexander Bercovitch, Paul-Émile Borduas, Simone Mary Bouchard, Stanley Cosgrove, Louise Landry Gadbois, Eric Goldberg, Jack Humphrey, John Goodwin Lyman, Louis Muhlstock, Alfred Pellan Goodridge Roberts, Jori Smith, and Philip Surrey. Moe Reinblatt was included later. The Society had up to 62 members: artists, but also collectors and art professionals, such as historian and critic Maurice Gagnon.
