= Katerina Atanassova =

Canadian curator

- Born: 1965 (age 60–61); Sofia, Bulgaria
- Known for: curator, art historian and museum administrator specializing in historical and contemporary Canadian art

Katerina Atanassova (born 1965) has been the Senior Curator of Canadian Art at the National Gallery of Canada since 2014. She is an art historian and museum administrator of diverse interests, from medieval to contemporary Canadian art. At the National Gallery of Canada, she is responsible for developing the national collections of Canadian painting, sculpture, prints and drawings, and decorative arts, dating up to 1980, and she has re-installed the permanent collection of Canadian art as well as curating exhibitions.

== Career ==
Atanossova was born in Sofia, Bulgaria and received her B.A. in History and Art from the University of Sofia. She came to Canada in 1990. She holds an M.A. in Medieval Studies from the University of Toronto (1994). She was a Ph.D. candidate and adjunct instructor at York University, Department of Visual Arts and Culture, when she was hired by the Frederick Horsman Varley Art Gallery of Markham in Unionville in 1999 as the education/program co-ordinator and as Collection curator. Her exhibitions for the Varley Art Gallery included William Berczy - man of enlightenment (2004); Towards the Spiritual in Canadian Art (2005) and F.H. Varley: Portraits into the Light (2007).

In 2009, she was hired at the McMichael Canadian Art Collection in Kleinburg, Ontario as director of exhibitions and chief curator. She re-installed the permanent collection and also co-curated the exhibition Painting Canada: Tom Thomson and the Group of Seven (2011), organized by London's Dulwich Picture Gallery and the National Gallery of Canada. Her shows at the McMichael included You Are Here: Kim Dorland and the Return to Painting (2013) and Eyes on Quebec: treasures from the Andrée Rhéaume Fitzhenry & Robert Fitzhenry Collection (2014).

She was hired by the National Gallery of Canada in 2014. For the National Gallery, she organized Morrice: the A.K. Prakash collection in trust to the nation (2017) and Canada and Impressionism: New Horizons: 1880-1930 (2019) which travelled to the Kunsthalle München, Munich, Germany; the Fondation de l'Hermitage, Lausanne, Switzerland; and the Musée Fabre, Montpellier, France before arriving in Ottawa in the National Gallery of Canada in 2022, where it received acclaim from television channels such as Ottawa – CTV News as "a beautiful chance to escape to beauty". In 2021, she co-curated Magnetic North: Imagining Canada in Painting 1910-1940 (2021), co-organized by the Schirn Kunsthalle Frankfurt, the Art Gallery of Ontario, and the National Gallery of Canada.

== Writing ==
Atanassova wrote William Berczy - man of enlightenment (2004) and F.H. Varley: Portraits into the Light (2007) for the Varley Art Gallery in Markham as well as co-authoring The sacred image of the icon: a world of belief (2008). At the National Gallery of Canada, she authored the major in-depth book, Morrice: the A.K. Prakash collection in Trust to the Nation (2017); and Canada and Impressionism: New Horizons (2020) praised as "not just a coffee table book but also a major contribution to the history of World Impressionism" by the Canadian Art Review RACAR.
