= Lillian Freiman (artist) =

Canadian painter

- Born: June 21, 1908; Guelph, Ontario
- Died: September 6, 1986 (aged 78); New York City

Lillian Freiman (June 21, 1908 - September 6, 1986) was a Canadian painter who studied in Montreal and France before settling in New York City. Influenced by Edgar Degas and Toulouse-Lautrec, she was known for her subtle interpretations of every day people.

== Biography ==
Frieman was born on June 21, 1908, in Guelph, Ontario. After her family moved to Montreal, she attended the Art Association of Montreal and the École des beaux-arts de Montréal where she studied with Edmond Dyonnet, Emmanuel Fougerat and Robert Mahias.

After attending the Art Students League of New York, Freiman moved to France. There she lived in Paris and Brittany, often using the faces of Bretons as the focus of her work. In 1938 Freiman returned to Canada due to the impending outbreak of World War II. She briefly lived in Toronto before moving to New York City in 1939, where her work often featured orchestras and musicians. Freiman was influenced by French painters Degas and Toulouse-Lautrec. She predominantly worked in oils and pastels and her work, which often focused on people, was known for its personal and sensitive interpretations. At the time of her death Charles Hill, Curator of Canadian art at the National Gallery of Canada, noted of her work: "There was a reticent and lyrical quality to it and an economy of line, but she avoided making a strong statement."

Freiman died on September 6, 1986, at the age of 78, in New York. Her works are held in collections including the Art Gallery of Ontario, the Agnes Etherington Art Centre, the McMaster Museum of Art and the Robert McLaughlin Gallery, Oshawa.
