= James Wilson Morrice =

Canadian artist (1865–1924)

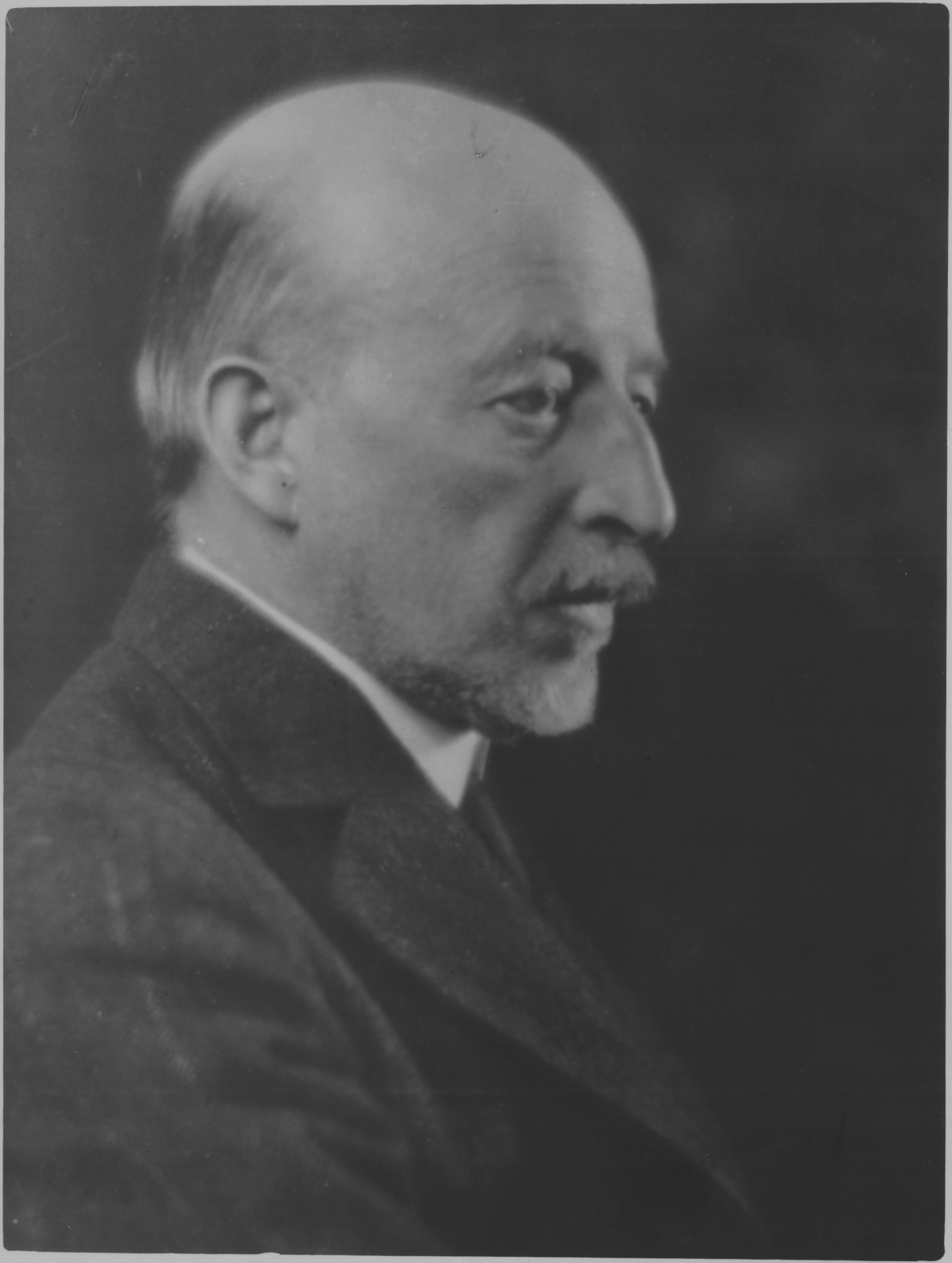
- Born: August 10, 1865; Montreal, Canada East
- Died: January 23, 1924 (aged 58); Tunis, Tunisia
- Education: Académie Julian
- Known for: Painter
- Notable work: Prow of a Gondola, Venice
- Movement: Post-Impressionism

James Wilson Morrice RCA (August 10, 1865 – January 23, 1924) is considered Canada's foremost modernist artist. He was the first Canadian painter to be known internationally. In 1891, he moved to Paris, France, where he lived for most of his career with journeys to many different places such as, in France, Brittany, and Normandy, and elsewhere, Venice, North Africa, and the Caribbean, besides Quebec on his trips home. W. Somerset Maugham knew him and had one of his characters say,

...when you've seen his sketches...you can never see Paris in the same way again.

Clarence Gagnon, another admirer, said that the "suddenness of vision" in his paintings made them look as if "they flew out of a box of butterflies".

In Canada, James Morrice Street in New Bordeaux, Ahuntsic-Cartierville, Montreal is named in his memory.

== Biography ==
Morrice was born in Montreal, Canada East, the son of a merchant, and studied law in Toronto from 1882 to 1889. In 1890 he left to study painting in England. The next year he arrived in Paris, where he studied at the Académie Julian from 1892 to 1897. At the Académie Julian, he befriended Charles Conder and Maurice Prendergast, and also met Robert Henri. Also in 1896, he began to paint his small sketches on wooden panels, called "pochades". He then took lessons at the atelier of Henri Harpignies, who encouraged his students to paint en plein air.

Morrice continued to live in Paris until the First World War, although he spent most of his winters in Canada and travelled widely abroad. He was influenced by the art work he saw in Paris such as the Fauves at the 1905 Salon d'Automne (which he participated in) along with the several other Parisian art societies with which he exhibited regularly, while also remaining in touch with the Canadian art world. He joined the Canadian Art Club in Toronto (1907).

During this period he was also in contact with the literary milieu, with English expatriate intellectuals living in Paris, such as W. Somerset Maugham, Arnold Bennett, and Clive Bell. In 1911, he wrote Edmund Morris that there was excitement in London over the Post-Impressionism exhibition. As he wrote,

Everybody laughed and jeered but with a few exceptions it consisted of good things - art that will last.

In the winters of 1912 and 1912–1913, he stayed in Tangiers. His second trip coincided with a trip by Matisse whom he met and with whom he exchanged ideas about art. He was elected an honorary non-resident member of the Royal Canadian Academy in 1913.

With the advent of World War I, Morrice went to Montreal, and then to Cuba. There he began to succumb to alcoholism. The output of his last period is uneven and infrequent. In the summer of 1922 he travelled to Algiers, where he painted with Albert Marquet. This would be the last time that he painted, as his health began to rapidly deteriorate. He died, aged 58, in Tunis.

== Gallery ==
Morrice's paintings before the turn of the century are thinly painted and inspired by Whistler, both in sentiment and in treatment of colour. Just prior to World War I he began to paint, in a thicker style, winter Canadian scenes influenced by the Impressionists and particularly by Maurice Cullen, whom he met in 1897. In 1905, he would have seen Fauvist paintings in the Salon d'Automne and been influenced by their pure, bright hues. Some of his works during his Caribbean period are considered his best and are painted in a loose style influenced by Post-Impressionism and suggest artists such as Matisse.

He is noted for his sense of observation and ability to distill the essence of what he saw in his work, often in "pochades", little sketches. Morrice's images of café culture, or other public gatherings, including seasonal "fêtes," regatta or circus scenes, remain unique in Canadian art", as one curator writes. "The artist with the delicate eye", Matisse called him in 1925.

- Prow of a Gondola, Venice, 1897 National Gallery of Canada
- Return from School, 1901
- Quai des Grands-Augustins, 1903. The National Gallery of Canada
- The Ferry, Quebec, 1906. NGC
- Blanche Baume, 1912. NGC
- House in Santiago, 1915 Tate Gallery
- Village Street, West Indies, 1919. Montreal Museum of Fine Arts
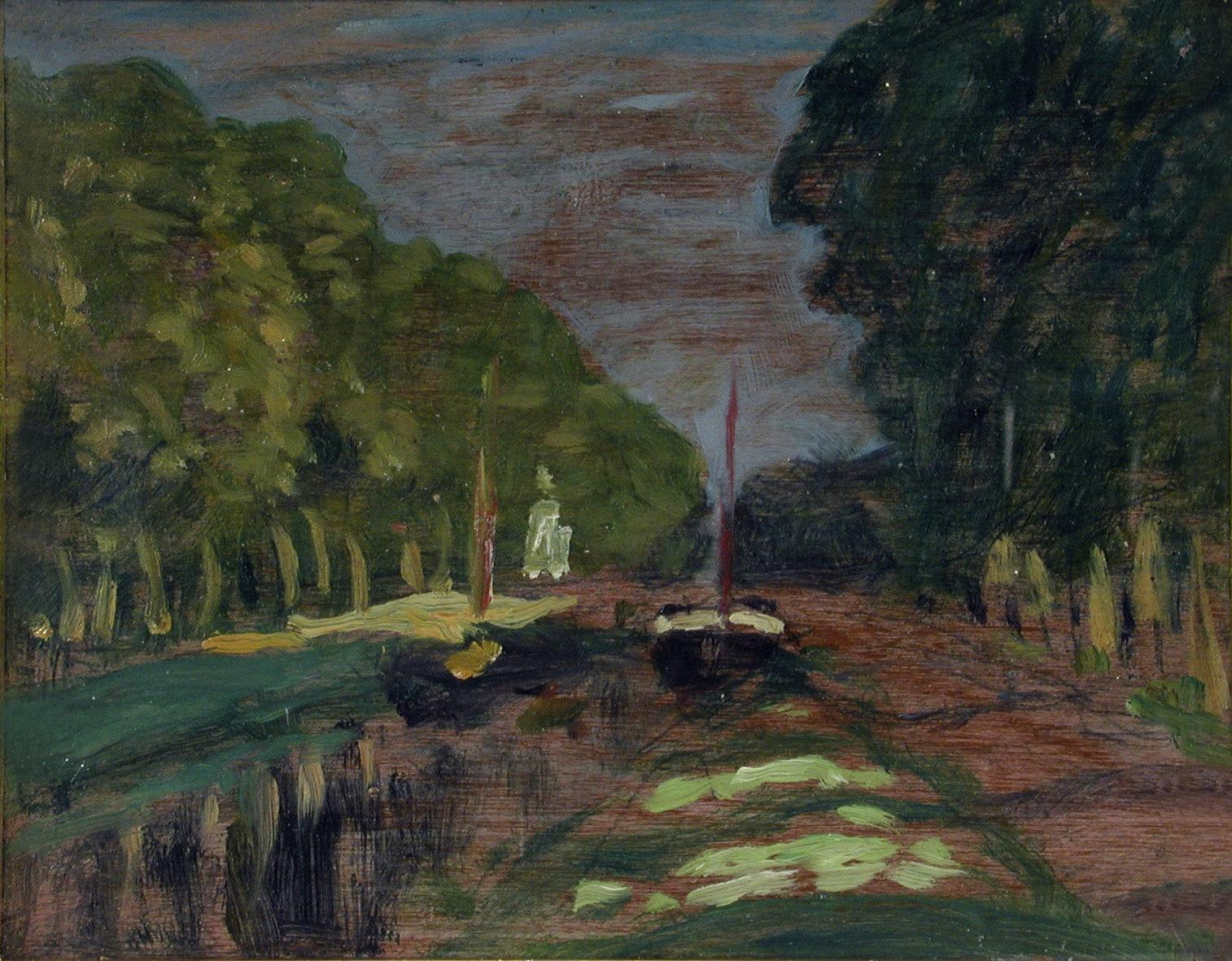
Paris Canal 1900 Musée d'art contemporain de Montréal

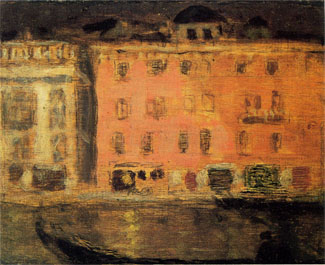
Venice c. 1900

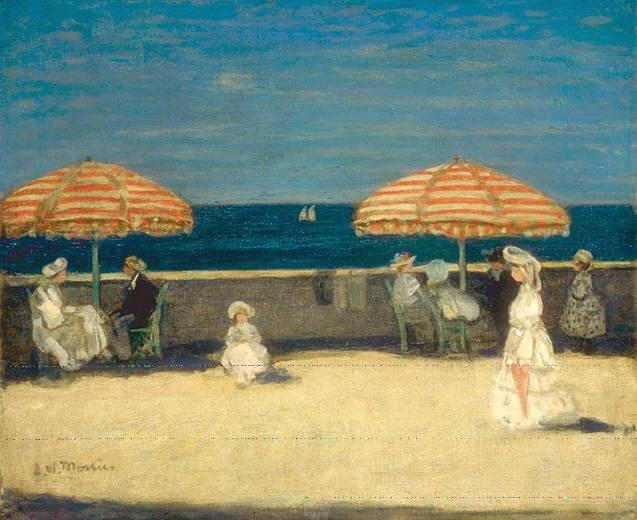
Dieppe, 1906

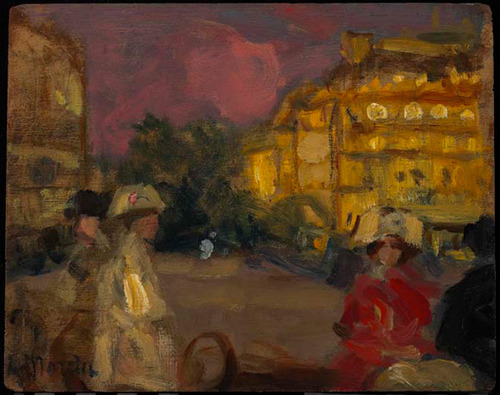
Street Scene Pink Sky Paris c. 1908 Art Gallery of Ontario

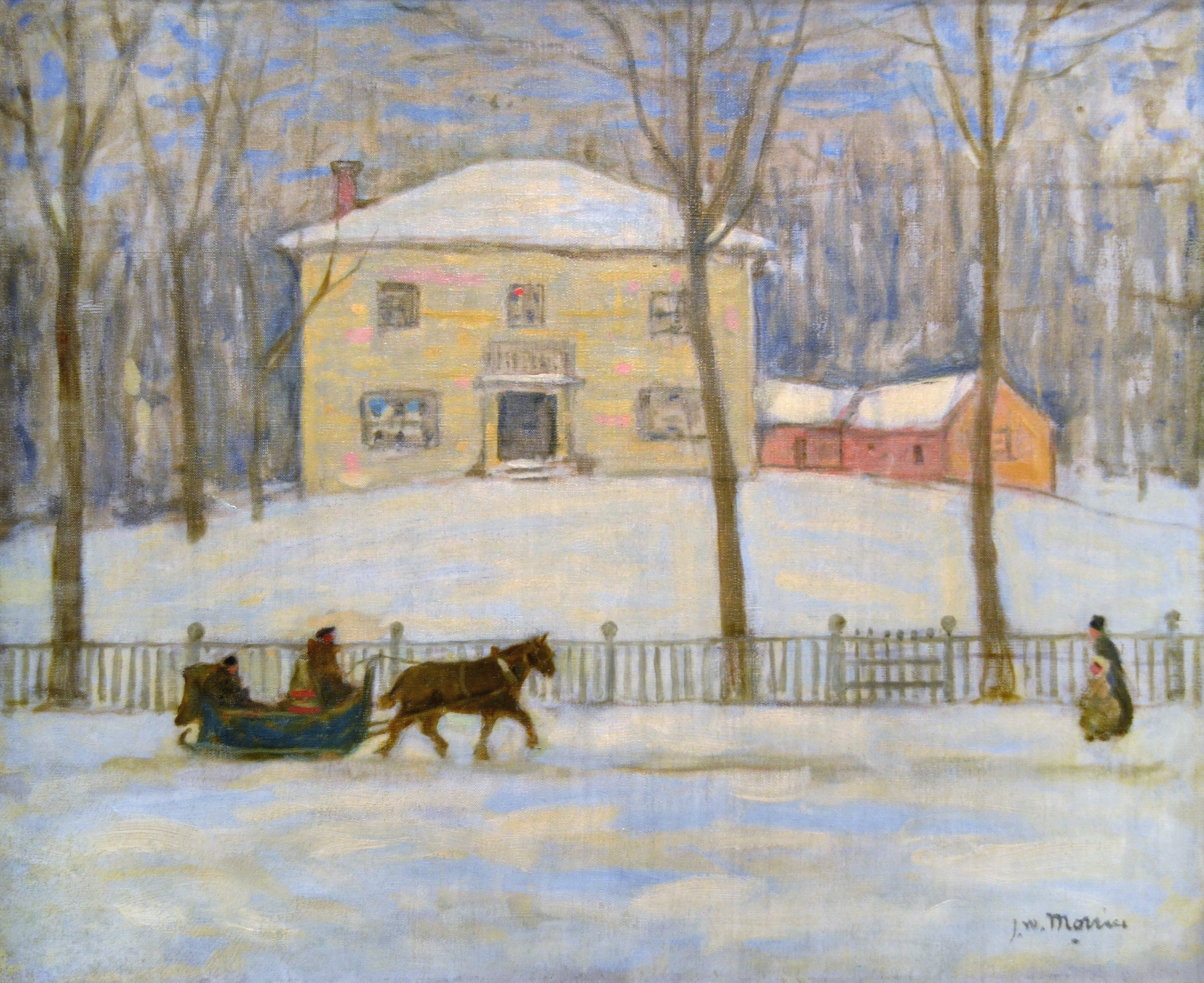
Old Holton House, Montreal, 1908-09 Musée des beaux-arts de Montréal

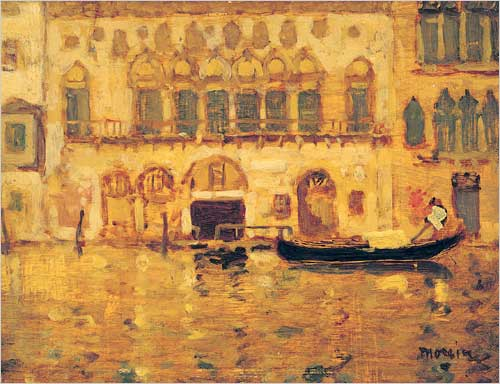
Venice, c. 1910

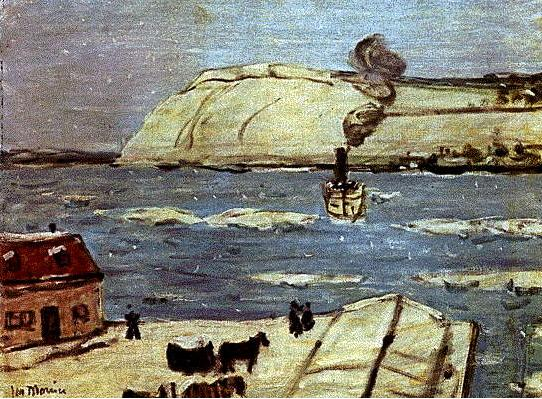
The Ferry, Quebec c. 1910

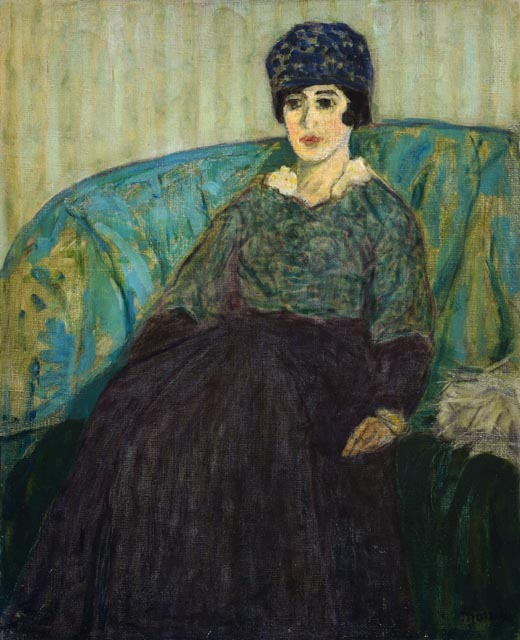
Blanche Baume, Oil on canvas, 1911–12, National Gallery of Canada

== Recognition and legacy ==
In 1958, works by Morrice along with those of Jacques de Tonnancour, Anne Kahane and Jack Nichols represented Canada at the Venice Biennale.

The Montreal Museum of Fine Arts is one of the two main repositories of his work along with the National Gallery of Canada. Montrealers David Rousseau Morrice (1903–1978) and F. Eleanore Morrice (1901–1981) willed to the Montreal Museum of Fine Arts many works of art they had collected during their lives, published as A Montreal Collection: Gift From Eleanore and David Morrice and exhibited at the Museum in 1983. Several significant gifts have enhanced the National Gallery's collection, enhanced by major publications such as Charles C. Hill's Morrice A Gift to the Nation The G. Blair Laing Collection (1992). In 2016, Ash K. Prakash gave the National Gallery a major collection of Morrice, which the National Gallery exhibited as James Wilson Morrice: The A.K. Prakash Collection in Trust to the Nation (2017) and travelled nationally (2018–2019). It was accompanied by a major and in-depth book on Morrice by Katerina Atanassova bearing the same title.

In 2023, the major book James Wilson Morrice: paintings and drawings of Venice by Sandra Paikowsky was published. In recognition of the artist's work in Venice as well as the book, the McMichael Canadian Art Collection organized a show in 2025 titled Morrice in Venice, advised by Paikowsky.
