= Marian Dale Scott =

Canadian painter (1906–1993)

Marian Dale Scott RCA
- Born: Marian Mildred Dale; 26 June 1906; Montreal, Quebec, Canada
- Died: 28 November 1993 (aged 87); Montreal, Quebec, Canada
- Other name: Marian Mildred Dale Scott
- Education: École des beaux-arts de Montréal; Slade School of Art
- Known for: Painting landscapes and cityscapes
- Movement: Abstract
- Spouse: F. R. Scott (m. 1928)
- Children: Peter Dale Scott

Marian Mildred Dale Scott RCA (née Dale; 1906–1993) was a pioneering modern Quebec painter.

== Biography ==
She was born Marian Mildred Dale in Montreal on 26 June 1906. She showed talent at an early age: her first works were exhibited in 1918. She attended The Study, a private school for girls, for three years and later became one of the first students at the École des beaux-arts de Montréal in 1924. After study in London at the Slade School of Art, she returned to her home city, where in 1928 she married the poet and law professor F. R. Scott. They had one son, the diplomat Peter Dale Scott.

Scott's career began with landscapes, followed by still life, then by cityscapes which reflected her social concerns. In the 1940s, she sought inspiration in scientific literature. In the 1950s, she was inspired by biblical subjects. She then became an abstract artist.

In the 1930s, Scott was active in anti-fascist movements and the Co-operative Commonwealth Federation, which her husband had helped found. She also taught art to disadvantaged children as part of an organization set up by her close friend Norman Bethune. As a pacifist, she campaigned for nuclear disarmament in the 1950s and against the Vietnam War in the 1960s.

Scott was a founding member of the short-lived but influential Contemporary Arts Society of Montreal ("Société d'art contemporain", 1939–1948), and was elected to the Royal Canadian Academy of Arts in 1973. She taught at St. George's School, the Montreal Museum of Fine Arts, and at Macdonald College.

Scott died on 28 November 1993 in Montreal.

== Awards ==
- Thomas More Institute, Purchase Award, 1967
- Ontario Society of Artists, Baxter Purchase Award, 1969
