= Ash K. Prakash =

Canadian art historian and dealer

A. K. Prakash
- Awards: Order of Canada (2016); D.F.A. (2018)

Ash K. Prakash CM is a philanthropist and scholar of Canadian art.

== Career ==
After completing his studies at the University of California and the University of Michigan, and later Harvard, Ash Prakash emigrated to Canada in 1968, settling in Ottawa by 1970. Here he worked in the federal government of Canada for 25 years, becoming the executive director and Principal Advisor on Information Management to the Queen's Privy Council for Canada and the Office of the Prime Minister (Canada) as well as serving in the Office of the Leader of Government in the House of Commons and Royal Commissions of Inquiry. He also advised the Canada Council for the Arts, the Canadian Broadcasting Company in Ottawa; UNESCO in Paris, Teheran and New Delhi; and the United Nations Development Program in New York and Cairo. Upon leaving public service, he moved to Toronto in 1995, and entered the art world to become one of Canada's foremost art dealers guiding the formation of some of North America's major art collections, along with a number of corporate and private art collections such as the Thomson Collection (Art Gallery of Ontario), The Sobey Art Collection, Nova Scotia, and UNESCO, Paris, as well as private collections.

== Publications ==
He has articles and books on Canadian art, among them Canadian Art: Selected Masters from Private Collections (2003), Independent Spirit: Early Canadian Women Artists (2008), a celebration of work by women artists who changed the face of Canadian art, and Impressionism in Canada: A Journey of Rediscovery (2014), called “astonishingly comprehensive” by one reviewer. It was a best seller on Amazon and a second edition was published by Arnoldsche Art Publishers, Stuttgart.

== Philanthropy ==
In 2012, he established the A. K. Prakash Foundation with the following goals: to advance scholarship on historical Canadian Art, and to promote Canadian medical expertise in increasing global access to health.

=== Art ===
The Foundation has sponsored numerous exhibitions and publications in major art galleries across Canada and abroad in the United Kingdom, France, Switzerland, Norway and the Netherlands. Some of the major Canadian exhibitions included, among others, Painting Canada: Tom Thomson and the Group of Seven (National Gallery of Canada), Into the Light: The Paintings of William Blair Bruce (1859-1906) (Art Gallery of Hamilton), Morrice and Lyman in the Company of Matisse (Musée national des beaux-arts du Québec, and the McMichael Canadian Art Collection, 2014), From the Forest to the Sea: Emily Carr in British Columbia (Art Gallery of Ontario), Modernism in Montreal: The Beaver Hall Group (Montreal Museum of Fine Arts), James Wilson Morrice: The A.K. Prakash Collection in Trust to the Nation (National Gallery of Canada), and Canada and Impressionism: New Horizons (National Gallery of Canada). In 2021, he funded an exhibition of a collection of bronzes by Marc-Aurèle de Foy Suzor-Coté, Alfred Laliberté, and Louis-Philippe Hébert that he gave to the Musée d’art de Joliette.

In 2015, the National Gallery of Canada received 50 works by James Wilson Morrice, which Prakash acquired work by work since the early 1980s and regarded as the heart of his collection, valued at more than $20 million. The A.K. Prakash Foundation, founded by Prakash, made the donation in honour of the artist's 150th birthday.

Prakash made the following announcement:

"The collection represents a governing force of my life's work. It is my gift to Canada donated in the hope that Morrice will inspire and enrich the lives of my fellow citizens and help remind us that Canadian art stands with the best in the world."

In honour of the gift, in 2015, the National Gallery named a gallery for Prakash and made the Morrice paintings part of a re-launch of the permanent collection in 2017, celebrating the 150th anniversary of the confederation of Canada.

Prakash has also given the National Gallery additional works of Canadian art and in 2022, he gifted the Art Gallery of Ontario Day After the Funeral, a 1925 watercolor and graphite on paper painting by Edward Hopper, considered the only drawing or watercolor in Canada by Hopper.

=== Medical ===
Prakash also founded The A.K. Prakash Fellowship in International Medicine. Annual Fellowships are awarded to medical graduates from the Global South to train under surgeons in the Faculty of Medicine at the University of Toronto and then return to their home countries to build and strengthen clinical care and education.

== Selected honours ==
- King Charles Coronation Medal, 2025 "for his unwavering support for the preservation and promotion of Canadian artistic heritage"
- Citation for "Loyal Service to the Government and People of Canada" by The Right Honourable Jean Chrétien, Prime Minister of Canada, 1997
- Dedication of “Ash K Prakash Gallery” by The National Gallery of Canada, 2015;
- Distinguished Patron of the National Gallery of Canada, 2016;
- Doctor of Fine Art (honoris causa) Awarded by The Nova Scotia College of Art and Design University, 2017;
- Member of Order of Canada, Awarded by The Governor General of Canada, 2019;
