= John Goodwin Lyman =

Canadian artist (1886–1967)

- Born: September 29, 1886; Biddeford, Maine, U.S.
- Died: 26 May 1976 (aged 89); Christ Church, Barbados
- Education: Académie Julian
- Known for: Painter, Art Critic
- Notable work: Woman With a White Collar
- Spouse: Corrine St. Pierre (m. 1910)

John Goodwin Lyman (September 29, 1886 – May 26, 1967) was an American-born Canadian modernist painter active largely in Montreal, Quebec. In the 1930s he did much to promote modern art in Canada, founding the Contemporary Art Society in 1939. Stylistically he opposed both the Group of Seven and the Canadian Group of Painters, painting in a more refined style influenced by the School of Paris.

== Biography ==
=== Formative Years (1886–1913) ===
Lyman was born in Biddeford, Maine. His parents were Americans who emigrated to Victoria, British Columbia.

After attending the High School of Montreal and spending two years at McGill University, Lyman departed for Paris in the spring of 1907, where he studied art until the fall, when at his father's urging he returned to study architecture at the Royal College of Art. January of next year found him back in Paris, where he studied at Académie Julian under Jean-Paul Laurens. There he formed a friendship with fellow Canadian James Wilson Morrice. Lyman enrolled at the Académie Matisse in the fall of 1909, which he left due to illness the next spring, returning to Montreal in the summer of 1910. Despite the brevity of his encounter with the master, Matisse would be a primary influence upon Lyman in the years to come.

That summer he married Corrine St. Pierre, and the two spent the next two years traveling intermittently in France. Upon his return to Montreal he exhibited four Fauve inspired works in the spring exhibit of the Art Association of Montreal, which were met with vitriol in the conservative press of Quebec. Another exhibit of forty-two oil paintings, his first one-man show, opened on May twenty-first and received a similar reaction.

=== Years of Exile (1913–31) ===
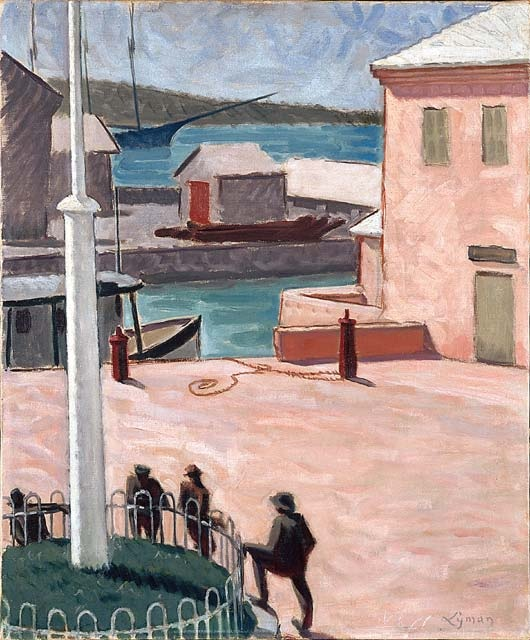
Landscape, Bermuda. (c. 1914) Oil on canvas, 55.4 x 45.9 cm. In the collection of the National Gallery of Canada

Due to his rejection in his native country, Lyman and his wife spent twenty-eight peripatetic years living in France, Spain, and North Africa. He bought a villa in Southern France in 1922, where he corresponded with Matisse. In October 1927 he briefly returned to Montreal for the opening of his second one-man show. The Great Depression lessened his income, forcing him to return to Montreal in 1931.

=== Return to Montreal (1931–1948) ===
A third one-man show was held in Montreal in February 1931. In November of that year Lyman began his attempts to bring European ideas of modern art to Canada with the opening of his Atelier, an academy-style school of art, established under the auspices of McGill University. It closed after just over a year due to lack of profit. In 1936 he began to write a column on art for The Montrealer that ran through 1942. The years 1936–39 saw three more one man shows, including one in New York City in May 1937.

In 1938 Lyman began to gather together Montreal painters who were disillusioned with the Canadian Group of Painters and The Group of Seven, and in December of that year they exhibited together as The Eastern Group of Painters. The Contemporary Arts Society was formally organized in January 1939, with Lyman as its first president. Through this body he organized exhibits of modern European art in Montreal, the first of which, titled "Art of Our Day" opened in May 1939. It included work by Kandinsky, Derain, and Modigliani. The first exhibit of the group was held in December 1939. By 1948 the CAS was rent by opposing factions with Paul-Emile Borduas and Alfred Pellan at their heads. After Borduas' election as president of the group in 1948, Pellan withdrew his group from the society, upon which Borduas resigned. Lyman, seeing that the Contemporary Art Society could no longer effectively fulfill its purpose, made a motion to dissolve the body. This was accepted at a meeting on November 18, 1948.

=== Later Years (1948–1967) ===
Lyman continued to paint figures in the years following the dissolution of the CAS, but the avant garde had shifted to the Automatism of Borduas and pure abstraction. In 1949 he accepted a professorship at McGill University, becoming the director of the fine arts department in 1952. He died, aged 89, in Christ Church, Barbados.

== Work ==
Woman with a White Collar, 1936. Oil on Cardboard.

Matisse, and other Fauvist painters, were the primary influence upon Lyman's work. His paintings were among the first in this style to be exhibited in Quebec, and his exhibit openings were met with derision in the popular press. In the 1920s, however, Lyman's work was more readily accepted. This was partly because of greater public exposure to modern art from Europe, and partly because of a change in Lyman's painting style.

While strongly influenced by Fauvism, Lyman's work is characterized by an emotional reserve and psychological distance out of keeping with that movement. His mature work does not stray far from Matisse in terms of subject matter (portraits, nudes, etc.), but displays relatively muted colors and smooth paint-handling.

Woman With a White Collar especially shows this mixture of Fauvist influence with Lyman's calm, classical personal style. It can be compared with similar portraits by Matisse in its handling of the facial planes and the somewhat arbitrary use of color, but displays a prim and static elegance in its contrast of the solidly formed head against the neutral background.

=== Selected list of works ===
- Profile of Corinne, 1913. Maurice Corbeil, Montreal.
- Reading, 1925. Anatoly Ciakca, Vancouver.
- Woman With a White Collar, 1936. National Gallery of Canada, Ottawa. The woman depicted is Mrs. Leonard Marsh.
