= Louis Muhlstock =

Canadian painter (1904–2001)

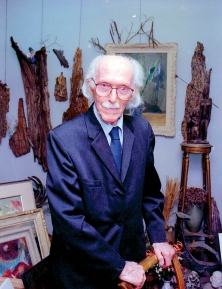
- Muhlstock in 1995 in front of some of his works.
- Born: April 23, 1904; Narajów, Galicia, Austria-Hungary
- Died: August 26, 2001 (aged 97); Montreal, Quebec, Canada
- Occupation: Painter

Louis Muhlstock, OC CQ LL.D. (April 23, 1904 – August 26, 2001) was a Canadian painter best known for his depictions of the Great Depression and for landscapes and urban scenes in and around Montreal.

== Career ==
Born in Narajów, Galicia, Austria-Hungary, Muhlstock emigrated to Montreal in 1911. He worked as a bookkeeper during the day and at night studied art at the Council of Arts and Manufacturers, at the school of the Art Association of Montreal with William Brymner, attended Royal Canadian Academy of Arts evening classes with Maurice Cullen and others, and also at the Ecole des Beaux-Arts of Montreal (1922–1928). From 1928 to 1931, he studied art in Paris with the figure painter Louis Biloul, also sketching at the Académie de la Grande Chaumière and exhibiting his work at the Paris salons. He spent summers sketching in the provinces or visiting museums in Belgium (1928–1931). He returned to Montreal to become a full-time painter.

In 1937, he showed his work in Toronto with the Picture Loan Society. Afterwards, his work was shown at many galleries in both solo and group exhibitions. He had a solo exhibition in 1949 at the National Gallery of Canada, which travelled to several cities. In 1996, an 80-piece retrospective exhibited Muhlstock's work at galleries in Québec, as well as in Edmonton. In 2010, his work was exhibited as part of the McCord Museum's Jewish Painters of Montreal: Witnesses of Their Time, 1930-1948.

He was a member of the Canadian Group of Painters, the Canadian Society of Graphic Art, The Federation of Canadian Artists and the Contemporary Arts Society.

== Honours ==
In 1978, he was awarded a Doctor of Laws, honoris causa from Concordia University. In 1990, he was made an Officer of the Order of Canada. In 1998, he was made a Knight of the National Order of Quebec.

== Bibliography ==
- Bradfield, Helen (1970). Art Gallery of Ontario: the Canadian Collection. Toronto: McGraw Hill. ISBN 0070925046.
- MacDonald, Colin (1979). A Dictionary of Canadian Artists, vol. 4 (Third ed.). Ottawa: Paperbacks – via Internet Archive.
