= Jori Smith =

Canadian artist (1907 – 2005)

- Self-portrait, 1945
- Born: Marjorie Elizabeth Thurston Smith; January 1, 1907; Montreal, Canada
- Died: November 25, 2005 (aged 98); Montreal, Canada
- Known for: Painter
- Spouse: Jean Palardy

Marjorie "Jori" Smith CM RCA (January 1, 1907 – November 25, 2005) was a key figure in the 1930s in initiating Canada's modernist art movement. She was a founding member of the Contemporary Arts Society in 1939.

== Biography ==
Smith was born in Montreal, Canada on January 1, 1907. Her early training was at the Art Association of Montreal where she studied under Randolph Hewton. Subsequently, her studies took her to the École des beaux-arts de Montréal and in 1938 she became the only woman member in the Eastern Group of Painters. She was known for her landscapes and portraits of children painted in Charlevoix county in the 1930s and 1940s. She married Jean Palardy in 1930, and spent much of the following decade in the Baie Saint-Paul area with Palardy, himself a painter film-maker and antique expert. Friendships with writer Gabrielle Roy and ethnographer Marius Barbeau were honed in this period. She was a founding member of the Contemporary Arts Society, and her works were included in the exhibitions of the Art Association of Montreal. In 1998 she published Charlevoix County, 1930, based largely on an early manuscript of her memories of the people that she painted in the 1930s in rural Quebec. In 2002, Jori Smith was appointed a member of the Order of Canada. She was made a member of the Royal Canadian Academy of Arts.

Her memoirs, Charlevoix County, 1930, were published in 1998. The book was shortlisted for the QSPELL Mavis Gallant Prize and First Book Prize.

Smith died in Montreal on November 25, 2005.

== Works ==
- Charlevoix County, 1930 ISBN 0-921254-83-0 (Penumbra Press; 1998);

== Legacy ==
Her works are held in museums including the National Gallery of Canada, notably "The Communicant", dating from her many years at Petite Rivière St Francois. The Montreal Museum of Fine Arts, the Musée d'art contemporain de Montréal, and the Library and Archives Canada also maintain collections of her work.
