= Eric Goldberg (artist) =

Jewish-Canadian painter

- Born: 1890; Berlin, Germany
- Died: 1969; Montreal, Canada
- Education: École des Beaux-Arts, Académie Julian
- Known for: Painter

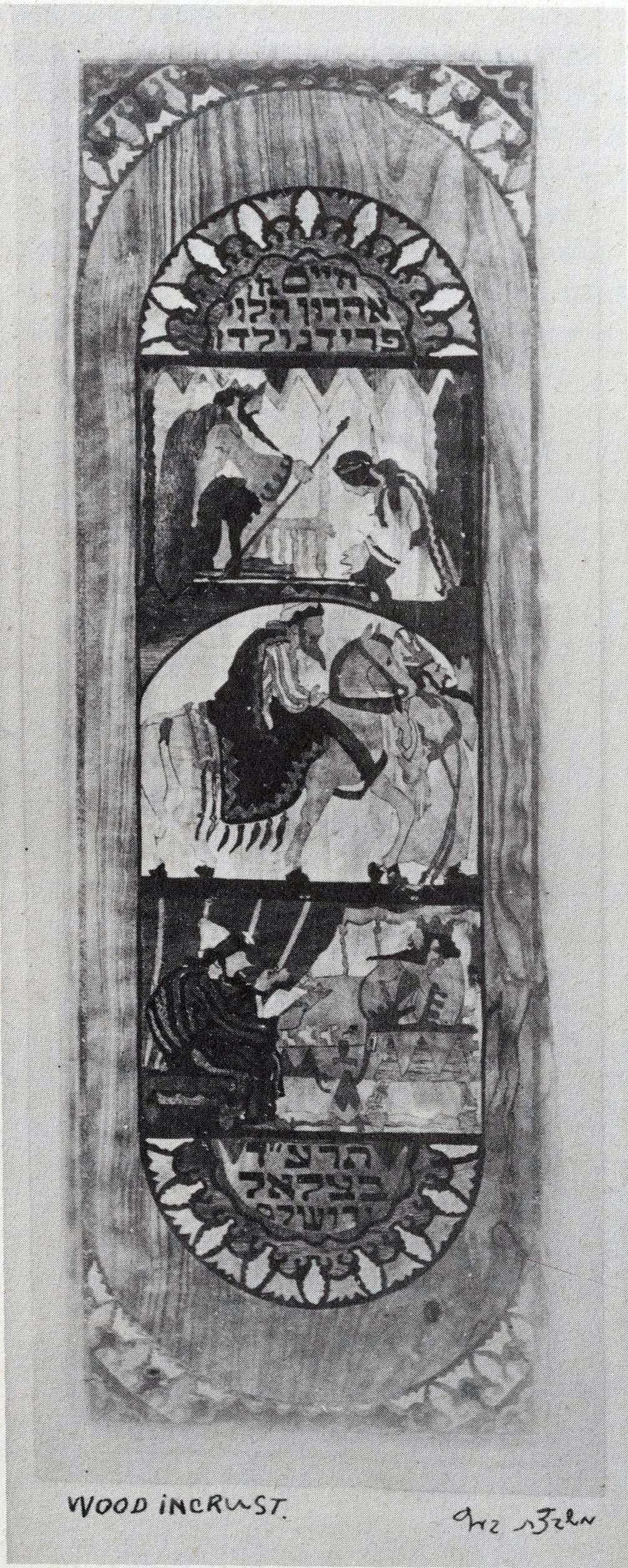
Wood inlay (c. 1911) after Eric Goldberg's design, Bezalel School of Arts and Crafts

Eric Goldberg (1890–1969) was a Jewish-Canadian painter, born in 1890 in Berlin, Germany. No was influenced by the art of Pierre-Auguste Renoir at an early age. He studied at Paris, France's École des Beaux-Arts (1906–1910) and Académie Julian with Tony Robert-Fleury, Jules Joseph Lefebvre and Jean-Paul Laurens, and taught at the Prussian Academy of Arts and, later, the Bezalel School of Arts and Crafts, Jerusalem (1911–1915), returning to teach again in then British Mandate of Palestine from 1924 to 1926. He began working in Montreal in 1928, and soon after began favouring the landscapes of Quebec's Gaspésie region as subjects. In 1939, Goldberg became a founding member of the Contemporary Arts Society (in French, Société d'art contemporain), a group of Canadian artists intent on sensitizing the public to modern art.

His work has been exhibited in Europe, Asia, and North America. He married Quebec-born Regina Seiden (1897) - a well-respected artist in her own right - who studied with William Brymner and Maurice Cullen. Goldberg was also a member of the Eastern Group of Painters, a group founded in Montreal to counter the nationalism of the Canadian Group of Painters. He was well represented by Max Stern's Dominion Gallery in Montreal.

Goldberg died in Montreal in 1969.

== Selected collections ==
- National Gallery of Canada, Ottawa
- Canadian Jewish Congress National Archives, Ottawa
- Peel Art Gallery, Museum and Archives, Brampton
- Israel Museum, Jerusalem
- Musée national des beaux-arts du Québec, Quebec

The archives at the National Gallery of Canada also has a fonds including roughly 180 of his works, separate from the main art collection.
