= Alfred Pellan =

Canadian artist

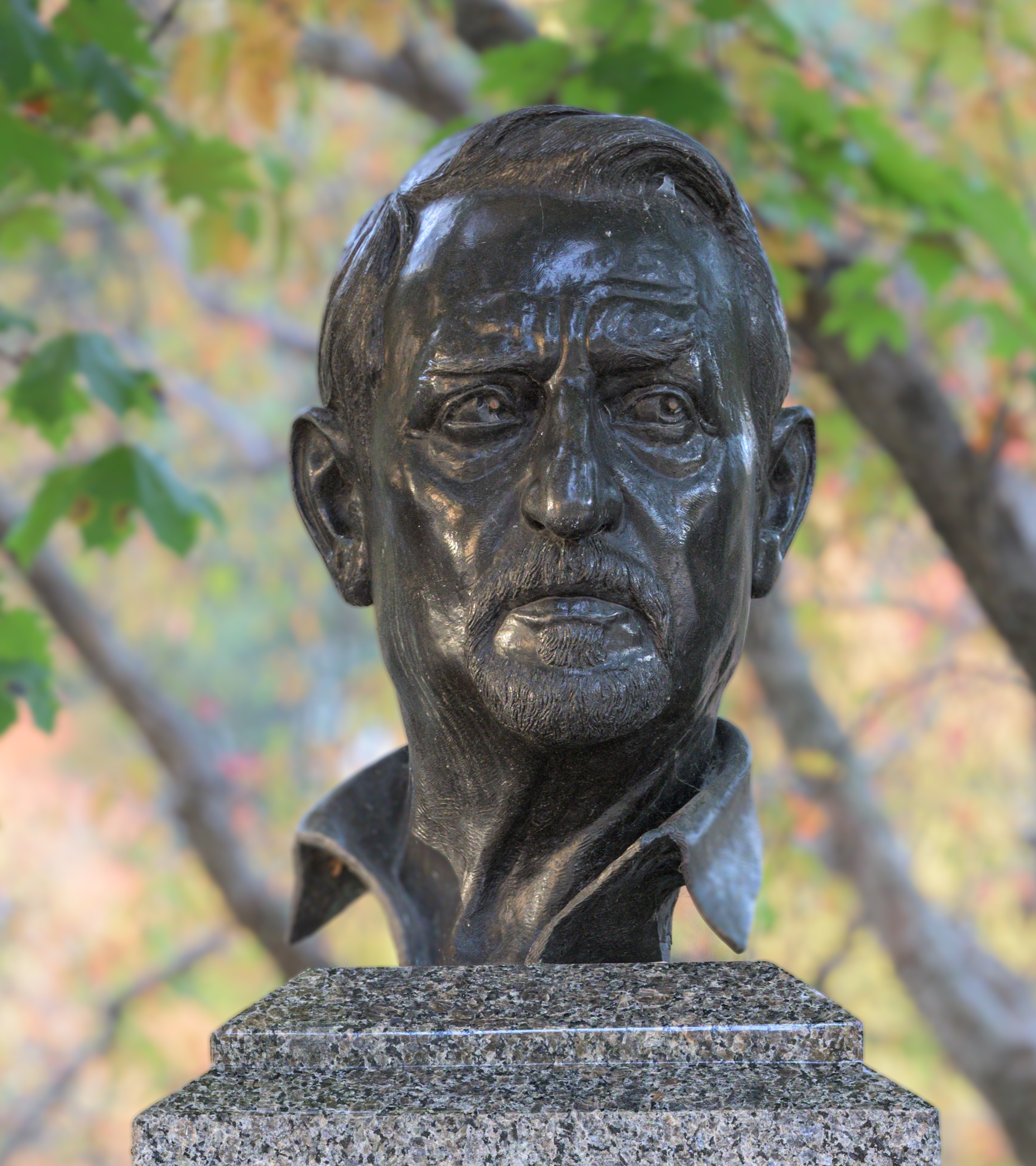
- Born: Alfred Pelland; 16 May 1906; Quebec City, Quebec, Canada
- Died: 31 October 1988 (aged 82); Montreal, Quebec, Canada
- Education: École nationale supérieure des Beaux-Arts
- Known for: Painter
- Movement: Modernism
- Awards: Premier prix 1928, École nationale supérieure des Beaux-Arts

Alfred Pellan CC OQ RCA (born Alfred Pelland; 16 May 1906 – 31 October 1988) was an important figure in twentieth-century Canadian painting.

== Biography ==
Alfred Pellan was born on 16 May 1906 in the Saint-Roch quarter of Quebec City. His mother, Régina Damphousse, died when he was young, and his father, Alfred Pelland, a locomotive engineer, raised their three children. In school, Pellan filled the margins of his notebooks with drawings and excelled at his art classes, with little interest in other subjects. He later changed his surname to "Pellan".

In 1920 Pellan enrolled at the School of Fine Arts of Quebec. He won first prizes in advanced courses and earned medals in painting, drawing, sculpture, sketching, anatomy and advertising. He sold his first painting at the age of 17 to the National Gallery of Canada in Ottawa.

In 1926 Pellan received the first fine arts scholarship in Quebec, which allowed him to spend several years in Paris and visit Venice. From 1926 until 1930, he studied at the École nationale supérieure des Beaux-Arts in Paris. Besides his mandatory classes, Pellan also sat in on sessions at the Académie de la Grande Chaumière and the Académie Colarossi, where he met painter Lucien Simon (1861–1945). When his scholarship ended, he prolonged his stay in Paris, taking on odd jobs as a graphic designer and poster publisher as well as receiving financial support from his father. He won first prize at the exhibition of mural art in 1935 in Paris and rubbed elbows with the most famous artists of the time. Traveling Europe, he became "permeated by the mainstream art of the era". His early canvases, from his first visit to Paris, show a marked fauvist tendency.

In 1936, at the urging of his father, Pellan applied for a professorship at the École des Beaux-Arts in Quebec City. However, he was rejected by the jury, who found him too "modern". With the outbreak of the Second World War, he returned to Canada and settled in Montreal in 1940. In June 1940, Pellan exhibited more than 161 works at the Musée de la Province in Quebec City (now the Musée national des beaux-arts du Québec) and at the Art Association of Montreal. Reflecting a wide range of stylistic techniques and encompassing much of his Parisian oeuvre, critics lauded the artist, suggesting that his work reflected a turning point in Canadian art history. However, these works were not commercially successful and Pellan struggled to find consistent buyers in the Canadian market. From 1943 to 1952 he taught at the École des Beaux-Arts in Montreal. His active opposition to the theories of Charles Maillard, the school's director, succeeded in pressuring Maillard to resign in 1944. The school then became more liberal in its approach. Pellan committed himself to an independent art, more open to universality and evolution.

During the 1940s, Pellan illustrated poetry books and designed costumes and sets for the theatre. His style matured and developed during this period. Surrealism began to attract him more strongly: his imagery became more erotic and his paintings, always vivid and striking, became larger, more complex and more textured. Pellan remained actively engaged with the Surrealist movement, continuing to explore its stylistic techniques and visual motifs throughout his career. Art historian Maria Rosa Lehmann suggests that Surrealism's influence in Quebec is strongly tied to Pellan.

Though Pellan had no desire to be formally associated with any particular art movement, in early 1948 he founded the group Prisme d’yeux. Its manifesto was written by Jacques de Tonnancour and advocated freedom of expression in art, speaking for a group that called for art free of any ideology. Later that year, an even more radical group was formed, which produced the manifesto Refus global first set out by Borduas, which completely overshadowed the manifesto penned by Prisme d'yeux. Although Pellan and Borduas shared the same impetus to challenge conservatism within the Quebec art world, they were often at odds over their differing views concerning modern art's social role. Whereas Borduas advocated for moving beyond public opinion, Pellan aimed to make modern art accessible to collectors and general audiences.

In 1952, Pellan received a scholarship from the Royal Society of Canada, which enabled a return to Paris. He remained in Paris with his wife Madeleine, whom he had married in 1949, until 1955. During this brief stay, the Musée d'Art Moderne de Paris organized an exhibition of 181 of his works, sponsored by the governments of France and Canada. Pellan was the first Canadian to be given a solo exhibition in Paris in the museum.

Works by Pellan along with those of David Milne, Goodridge Roberts and Emily Carr represented Canada at the Venice Biennale in 1952.

Back in Quebec for two years, he resumed his painting classes in 1957 as a professor at the Art Centre of Sainte-Adèle while living in his house in Auteuil, Laval. His reputation continued to grow among Canadian art experts, he became more widely known through solo and group exhibitions, and he received commissions for murals, which helped establish his fame throughout the country.

In 1971, he received an honorary doctorate from Sir George Williams University, which later became Concordia University.

== Death ==
In 1978, Pellan was diagnosed with leukemia and produced only five works during his last ten years with the aid of his assistant Michel Vermeulen. He died in Montreal on 31 October 1988, aged 82 and was interred in the Parc du Souvenir in Auteuil. His wife died in 2010.

== Recognition and legacy ==
Several monographs and documentaries were devoted to him during his lifetime. He received a number of awards and honours, notably Companion of the Order of Canada. He was made a member of the Royal Canadian Academy of Arts.

On 21 April 1995 Canada Post issued 'Blossoming, c. 1950, Alfred Pellan' in the Masterpieces of Canadian art series. The stamp was designed by Pierre-Yves Pelletier based on a painting "Blossoming", circa 1950 by Alfred Pellan in the National Gallery of Canada, Ottawa, Ontario. The 88¢ stamps are perforated 13 X 13.5 and were printed by Canadian Bank Note Company, Limited.

Two of Pellan's paintings, Canada West and Canada East, were commissioned for the Canadian mission in Brazil in the 1940s and relocated to the Lester B. Pearson Building in Ottawa in 1973. From 2011 to 2015 they were removed by the federal government and replaced by a large portrait of the Queen. In November 2015 the two paintings were restored to their original location.

=== Tributes ===
- A federal electoral district in Laval, Québec, named after him;
- A street in Montréal is named after him.
- A street in Longueuil is named after him.
- A street in Lévis is named after him.
- A street in Terrebonne is named after him.
- A street in Saint-Jérôme is named after him.
- A street in Drummondville is named after him.
- A street in Granby is named after him.
- A street in Mirabel is named after him.
- A street in Blainville is named after him.
- A street in Shawinigan is named after him.
- A street in Sainte-Julie is named after him.
- A place in Boisbriand is named after him.
- A street in Saint-Lin-Laurentides is named after him.
- A street in Sainte-Catherine is named after him.
- A street in Saint-Charles-Borromée is named after him.
- A street in Notre-Dame-de-l'Île-Perrot is named after him.
- A road in Petite-Rivière-Saint-François is named after him.
- A lake in Rivière-Koksoak is named after him.
