= Goodridge Roberts =

Canadian artist (1904-1974)

- Born: William Goodridge Roberts; 1904; Bridgetown, Barbados
- Died: 1974 (aged 69–70); Montreal, Quebec
- Education: École des Beaux-Arts de Montréal and at the Art Students League of New York with John Sloan, Boardman Robinson and Max Weber (1926–1928)
- Spouse: Marian Susan Wilson (m. 1933)
- Awards: Officer of the Order of Canada

William Goodridge Roberts OC RCA (1904–1974) was a Canadian painter known for his landscape paintings, still lifes, figure paintings and interiors. He was also a teacher.

== Career ==
Goodridge Roberts was the son of poet and novelist Theodore Goodridge Roberts and Frances Seymour Allen. Roberts was born in Bridgetown, Barbados, in 1904 while his parents were on holiday from their New Brunswick home.

Roberts studied at the École des Beaux-Arts de Montréal and at the Art Students League of New York with John Sloan, Boardman Robinson and Max Weber (1926–1928). He moved to Ottawa in 1930, where he exhibited his work, and opened a summer school for painting in nearby Wakefield, in the Gatineau Valley. In 1932, Roberts held his first solo exhibition at Montreal's Arts Club, where he came to the attention of John Lyman. From 1933 to 1936 he was the resident artist at Queen's University, afterwards moving to Montreal. In 1938, Roberts, joined the Eastern Group of Painters as a charter member, and in 1939, again as a charter member, joined the Contemporary Arts Society, as well as exhibiting at the New York World's Fair. He taught at the Art Association of Montreal from 1940 to 1952. During the period from 1943 to 1945 he was an Official Second World War artist for the Royal Canadian Air Force, stationed in England. In 1952, works by Roberts along with those of Emily Carr, David Milne and Alfred Pellan represented Canada at the Venice Biennale.

A scholarship was awarded (in 1953) by the Canadian government to allow Roberts to study painting in France. Then in 1959 he won the Glaxebrook award at the National Gallery of Canada for a landscape painting. This year (1959) until 1960 Roberts was the first resident artist at the University of New Brunswick. In 1964, he won the A. J. Casson Award, the annual "Open Water" competition organized by the Canadian Society of Painters in Water Colour (CSPWC). In 1969, he was a recipient of the Order of Canada and was given a traveling retrospective exhibition by the National Gallery of Canada, an unusual honour for a living artist at the time.

He was made a member of the Royal Canadian Academy of Arts (1956). He was also a member of the Canadian Group of Painters. Among the people who praised Roberts` work was the well-known American art critic, Clement Greenberg, who, in 1963, said that his work had been the portal through which he became interested in Canadian art.

Following his death after a lengthy illness, his work was the subject of several museum solo exhibitions with publications, including a touring retrospective in 1998 titled Goodridge Roberts Revealed, curated by Sandra Paikowsky.

== See also ==
- Canadian official war artists
- War artist
- War art

== Bibliography ==
- Bradfield, Helen (1970). Art Gallery of Ontario: the Canadian Collection. Toronto: McGraw Hill. ISBN 0070925046. Archived from the original on June 7, 2020.
- Canadian Painting 1939 to 1963, an exhibition organized by the National Gallery of Canada at the Tate Gallery London, 1964
- Roberts, Joan (2009). Joan & Goodridge: My Life with Goodridge Roberts. Montreal: Véhicule Press.
