= The Sun (1792–1876) =

British evening newspaper

The Sun was a British evening newspaper established by John Heriot in 1792 and was discontinued in 1876. The paper was founded by members of the Tory government led by William Pitt the Younger to counter the contemporary pro-revolutionary press.

John Heriot, a Scottish journalist and writer, had worked for the Oracle and the World newspapers in 1791, editing both, but did not remain in either post for long. In 1792, at the instigation of Edmund Burke, he was recruited by the British Treasury to establish a pro-government newspaper, the Sun. This was secretly funded by members of the Tory government, on a private basis.

Heriot launched the Sun on 1 October 1792, and it quickly rose to become the second most popular newspaper in Britain, behind The Times. In 1793 he launched a morning paper, the True Briton. It too was funded by the Treasury and maintained a strongly pro-government pro-Tory line. The True Briton would continue for eleven years before collapsing in 1804. Heriot left newspaper editing to become a Commissioner of the Lottery in 1806. In its early years it was a "violent Tory evening paper" with "an evil reputation". William Jerdan edited the paper from 1813 to 1817.

In 1825 The Sun was bought by Patrick Grant and Murdo Young (Young also editing it) and its politics switched from Tory to Whig. Young organised teams of reporters, in Parliament and across the country, printed late into the night (unusual for an evening paper) and used mounted delivery riders and the stagecoach system, to ensure that The Sun gathered and distributed news faster than his rivals, sometimes beating the morning papers by 12 hours with news of Parliament, provincial political meetings and sporting events. In four years he tripled the paper's sales.

A former employee remembered that "Murdo Young was perhaps at the time the most enterprising news publisher in all London, and it was one of the sights of the great Metropolis to witness the despatch of the Express Edition from 112, Strand, to the General Post-Office, St Martin's-le-Grand." Newspapers were carried by eight "daring riders" on "8 of the fleetest horses", to meet the stage coaches carrying the post out of London.

In 1833 Young took full control of The Sun after Grant was declared bankrupt; Grant accused Young of foul play, and started the rival True Sun, with Charles Dickens as a contributor; but the True Sun was a failure and Young bought it and merged it with his Sun in 1837. The paper was secretly subsidised by the Anti-Corn Law League in 1842 in return for articles supporting their movement.

In the 1840s Young handed over the editorship to William Frederick Deacon and then, in 1845, to Charles Kent (who later married Young's eldest daughter Ann). All Young's three daughters, Ann, Catharine (1826-1908) and Floremma, worked as journalists. At least two of them worked for The Sun, with Catherine writing leaders, as well as reporting.

Young claimed to have spent £10,000 on his express news service, and had to borrow money to cover these expenses. Eventually, this debt forced him to sell The Sun, in 1862.

The copyright of the ailing newspaper was bought by William Saunders of the Central Press news agency in the 1860s. In 1871 he sold this copyright, along with other parts of his business, to a group of Conservatives, who published The Sun and Central Press.
