= George Heriot (artist) =

Scots-Canadian artist (1759–1839)

- Born: 1759; Haddington, Scotland
- Died: July 22, 1839 (aged 79–80)
- Known for: civil servant, author and artist

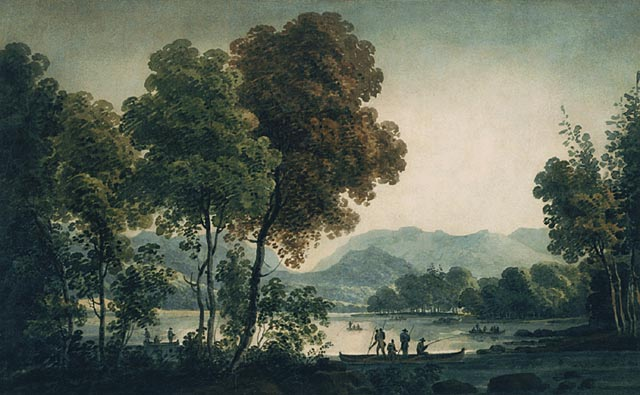
Lake St. Charles near Quebec - George Heriot (c. 1796 - 1806)

George Heriot (1759 – 22 July 1839) was a Scots-Canadian civil servant, author and artist. He is most notable as a major figure in early Canadian art.

== Early life ==
Heriot was born at Haddington, Scotland, in 1759, the eldest child of John Heriot, the sheriff clerk of the town, and his wife Marjory. The Heriots were part of the long-established family of the Heriots of Trabroun, the most well-known member of which was the seventeenth-century goldsmith and philanthropist George Heriot. He was educated at Duns and the Coldstream grammar school, before attending the Edinburgh Royal High School from 1769 to 1774, where he received a conventional classical education. After leaving the Royal High School he remained in Edinburgh, where he studied art under the encouragement of Sir James Grant.

In 1777 he travelled to London, apparently with the intention of beginning an artistic career, but instead found himself on a voyage to the West Indies. It is not known why he changed his plans, but his father's business had failed that year, causing his younger brother John to quit university and join the Army. He wrote and sketched extensively during his time in the Caribbean, and when he returned to London in 1781 he published A Descriptive Poem, written in the West Indies. On his return, he enrolled at the Royal Military Academy, Woolwich. Here, he was instructed in art and taught landscape drawing and painting, then considered an essential part of a military education, by Paul Sandby. (Woolwich training in art also was an indispensable part of the education of other military men who were artists such as James Pattison Cockburn, Philip John Bainbrigge and John Herbert Caddy).

He had left the academy by 1783, but remained in Woolwich, employed as a civilian clerk by the Army. In 1792, he was posted to Quebec, as a clerk in the ordnance office there.

== Canada ==
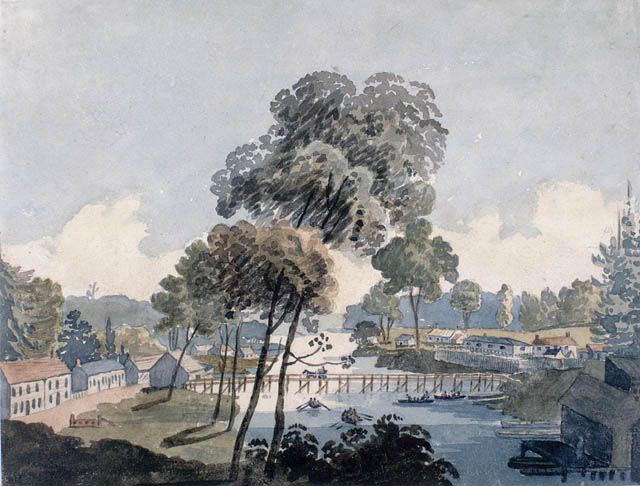
"Village of Chippawa near the Falls of Niagara" depicting King's Bridge in Chippawa, Ontario: George Heriot (c. 1801)

He arrived in Canada in 1792, the beginning of a quarter-century association with the colony. In his first years, little is recorded; some surviving sketches indicate he travelled around Quebec and Montreal, and he published one sketch in the winter of 1792. In 1796, he returned to Britain, travelling along the south coast and in Wales before spending some months at the University of Edinburgh. After preparing some paintings for exhibition at the Royal Academy, he left for Canada.

Shortly after his return to Quebec, he was appointed to the relatively senior position of assistant storekeeper general, perhaps through the influence of his younger brother, the journalist John Heriot. He held his two positions concurrently, drawing the salary for both, and when this was discovered by the commander-in-chief in 1799 he was removed from the new position. However, he had met William Pitt when in London - again through his brother's connections - and through Pitt's influence was appointed the deputy postmaster general for the whole of British North America in October 1799. He replaced Hugh Finlay, who had fallen into severe financial difficulty and no longer had the support of the government. However, a later attempt to gain Finlay's former seat on the Legislative Council of Lower Canada was unsuccessful, and permanently soured Heriot's relations with Robert Shore Milnes, the Lieutenant Governor.

He began his new career with vigour, aiming to expand efficient and speedy mail service beyond the existing Quebec to Montreal route, by using the existing profitable service to help kickstart a new network in the newly settled areas of Upper Canada. However, he quickly encountered both administrative and financial problems; the postmaster general required that all new services be able to support themselves, and refused to allow profits to be reinvested in the system rather than being remitted to central government. However, he received a certain degree of support from the local authorities - Peter Hunter, the lieutenant-governor of Upper Canada, was strongly in favour of improved infrastructure - and by 1805 had obtained a noticeable though limited increase in the quality of service in the west.

However, he found himself increasingly at odds with the administration, and eventually resigned his position in 1816. He returned to Britain, where he retired.

== Artistic work ==
Heriot was probably introduced to the picturesque style at Woolwich, and it can be found in his drawings and watercolours throughout the 1780s. Two drawings of Mohawks and two landscapes from Quebec are located at La Rochelle.

During his 1796 return to Britain, he submitted three watercolours to the Royal Academy of Arts, which were exhibited the following spring.

== Record sale prices ==
In Cowley Abbott's Live Auction of Important Canadian & International Art, Nov. 27, 2024, Lot #112, War Dance #1, watercolour over graphite on paper laid down on card, 10.5 x 14.5 in ( 26.7 x 36.8 cm ) ( sheet ), Auction Estimate: $1,000.00 - $1,500.00, realized a price of $20,400.00, and Lot #113, Dance of Indian Women, watercolour over graphite on paper laid down on card, 8.5 x 12.75 in ( 21.6 x 32.4 cm ) ( sheet ), Auction Estimate: $1,000.00 - $1,500.00, realized a price of $18,000.00.

== Writing ==
During his time in Canada, he spent a great deal of time travelling, as well as painting and writing. He published two books based on his experience of the country; The History of Canada from its first discovery (1804), and Travels through the Canadas (1807). The later of these is extensively illustrated with plates made from his own paintings.
