= George Heriot (disambiguation) =

George Heriot (1563–1624) was a Scottish goldsmith and philanthropist.

George Heriot may also refer to:

- George Heriot (Edinburgh MP) (1539/40–1610), Scottish goldsmith and politician, father of the above
- George Heriot (artist) (1759–1839), Scottish painter

== See also ==
- George Heriot's School
