= John Heriot =

John Heriot may refer to:

- John Heriot (footballer) (born 1940), Australian rules footballer
- John Heriot (journalist) (1760–1833), journalist and author
