= List of Canadian art awards =

This list of Canadian art awards covers some of the main art awards given by organizations in Canada. Some are restricted to Canadian artists in a particular genre or from a given region, while others are broader in scope.

Award	Sponsor	Notes
A. J. Casson Award	Canadian Society of Painters in Water Colour	
Amelia Frances Howard-Gibbon Illustrator's Award	Canadian Library Association	For outstanding illustrator of a new Canadian children's book
Audain Prize for the Visual Arts	Audain Foundation	
Canadian Cartoonist Hall of Fame		Significant lifelong contributions to the art of cartooning in Canada
Dufferin Medal	Earl of Dufferin	Defunct in 1879
Governor General's Awards	Governor General of Canada	see: List of Laureates of the Governor General's Award in Visual and Media Arts
Hnatyshyn Foundation Visual Arts Awards	Hnatyshyn Foundation	Mid-career Canadian visual artists and curators.
Joseph Plaskett Foundation Award	Joseph Plaskett Foundation; Royal Canadian Academy of Arts	Recent or current MFA graduate student with a specialization in painting
Lescarbot Award	Government of Canada	People who have contributed the most to their arts community
Lieutenant-Governor's Award for High Achievement in the Arts	New Brunswick Arts Board	Outstanding contribution by artists to the arts in New Brunswick
Portia White Prize	Province of Nova Scotia	Named for Portia White, a Nova Scotian artist
Prix Giverny Capital	Giverny Capital	For contemporary artists of Quebec
Prix Paul-Émile-Borduas	Government of Quebec	Named in honour of Paul-Émile Borduas
RBC Canadian Painting Competition	Canadian Art Foundation	
Saidye Bronfman Award	Canada Council	Award for fine craft
Joe Shuster Award	Canadian Comic Book Creator Awards Association	
Sobey Art Award	Sobey Art Foundation	For young Canadian artists
Strathbutler Award	Sheila Hugh Mackay Foundation	For a New Brunswick visual artist.
The Kingston Prize		A biennial competition open to any Canadian artist who depicts a Canadian citizen or permanent resident in a portrait based on a real life encounter.
Victor Martyn Lynch-Staunton Award	Canada Council	Canadian artists judged to be outstanding in their mid-careers
VIVA Awards	Jack and Doris Shadbolt Foundation	British Columbian mid-career artists
Doug Wright Award	Toronto Comic Arts Festival	Canadian cartoonists
Toronto Arts Foundation Award	Toronto Arts Foundation	presented to artists, cultural leaders and businesses in recognition of artistic excellence

== See also ==
- Canadian art
- Lists of art awards
