= The Weekly True Sun =

The Weekly True Sun was a London, pro-Whig, Sunday newspaper that was first published on 10 February 1833 (No. 1) and ceased publication on 29 December 1839 (No. 331). John Ager published and printed the Weekly True Sun and the True Sun.

In 1833–1834, Leigh Hunt, as 'The Townsman', published in the Weekly True Sun a series of nine essays on walking tours in various neighbourhoods of London.

From 5 January 1840 (No. 332) to 28 March 1841 (No. 394), the successor to The Weekly True Sun was published under the title The Statesman, or, The Weekly True Sun. From 4 April 1841 (No. 395) to 2 January 1842 (No. 518), the successor to The Statesman, or, The Weekly True Sun was published under the title The British Queen and Statesman.
