= Forshaw Day =

Canadian painter (1831–1903)

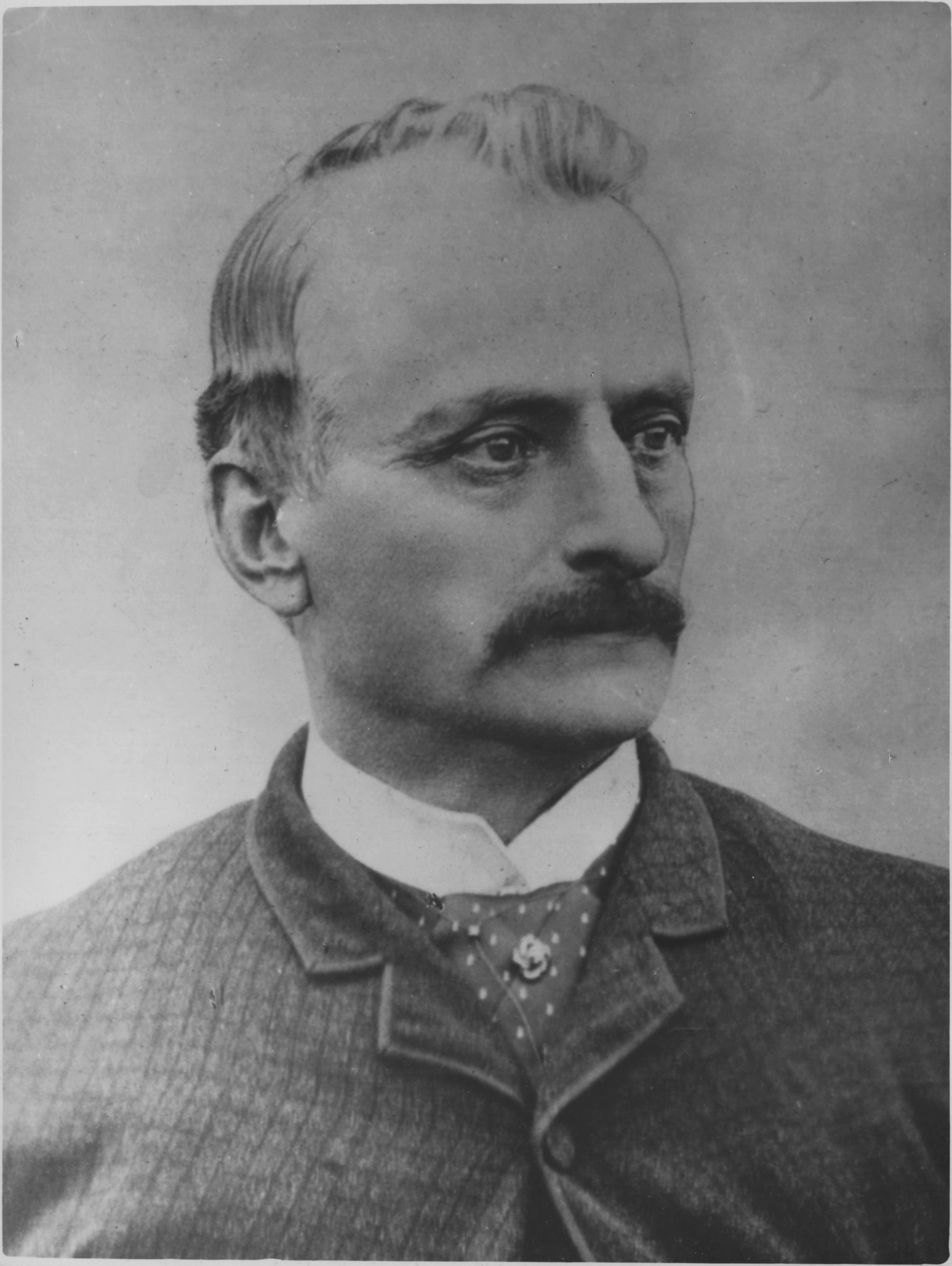
- Forshaw Day, taken between 1879 and 1897
- Born: 1831; London, England
- Died: 1903 (aged 71–72); Kingston, Ontario Canada
- Known for: Painter

Forshaw Day RCA (1831–1903) was a Canadian artist known for his landscapes.

== Life and work ==
Forshaw Day was born in London, England in 1831. He studied architecture and design at the Royal Dublin Society in Dublin, Ireland in 1857. He studied architecture and design at the South Kensington School of Art in London, England. Forshaw Day emigrated to Halifax, Nova Scotia at age 32 in 1862.

=== Early career ===
Forshaw Day opened a studio on Bedford Row in Halifax, Nova Scotia. He painted pictures and taught painting at the Technological Institute in Halifax, Nova Scotia, from 1862 to 1879. He prepared sets for Garrison theatre productions in Halifax, Nova Scotia. In 1876, Day supplied a panorama, "From Paris to London," for a professional theatre company.

He worked as a draftsman at the H.M. Naval Yard from 1862 to 1879 in Halifax, Nova Scotia. In 1863, a solo exhibition of his landscapes of Nova Scotia was held in Halifax. He held regular exhibitions in Halifax for 20 years, and he also sent his pictures to exhibit in London and Paris.

He moved to Kingston, Ontario, where he taught freehand drawing and painting at the Royal Military College of Canada from 1879 to 1897. A number of his paintings are now in the college collection. Day painted in England, Ireland, and Switzerland. In Canada, Day painted in the Maritimes, Ontario, British Columbia and the Northwest Territories.

=== Critical success ===
Forshaw Day worked in the late 19th century. Day was elected a member of the Ontario Society of Artists on August 14, 1879. In 1880, he was one of the founding members of the Royal Canadian Academy of Arts, and his work was included in their group exhibitions.

=== Final years ===
In 1901, members of the Royal Military College of Canada Club raised the Forshaw Day Painting Fund in aid of Prof. Forshaw Day, R.C.A., "in consideration of the friendly relations that always existed between him and the Cadets in attendance at the College, and in view of the fact that his circumstances were such as to appeal to the feelings of all those who had met him at Kingston." A number of his paintings were bought by club members, and an oil painting was donated to the college. He died in Kingston, Ontario, in 1903.

== Work ==
Forshaw Day's body of work includes oils on canvas, watercolours and etchings. His preferred subjects were landscapes and marine seascapes. The improvement of roads and extension of railroads in rural Nova Scotia allowed for Day to travel across the province and paint on location more easily.

== Museums ==
Forshaw Day's work is found in various museums and private collections.

- The Royal Military College of Canada has two Forshaw Day paintings, no date, oil on canvas, on display in the Senior Staff Mess, both western scenes of the Rocky Mountains, which have plaques indicating they were gifts to the college from ex-cadets, donated in memory of pleasant days spent out sketching with the professor. One is entitled "On the Bow" whilst the other is untitled. A smaller work, entitled "Lake Ontario Park" is now in storage in Yeo Hall.
- Purcell's Cove; Spectacle Island – no date. oil on canvas, Art Gallery of Nova Scotia in Halifax, Nova Scotia
- National Gallery of Canada Library & Archives in Ottawa, Ontario.
- Yarmouth County Museum & Archives in Yarmouth, Nova Scotia.

== Recognition ==
Forshaw Island, St Joseph Channel, Algoma, Ontario, Canada was named in honour of late Professor Forshaw Day, Esq., R.C.A sometime Professor of Drawing at the Royal Military College, Kingston c. 1879.

== Legacy ==
The Art Gallery of Nova Scotia organized an exhibition of his work curated by Michael McCormack and titled Forshaw Day: Looking Outward in 2026.
