= William Frederick Deacon =

English author and journalist

William Frederick Deacon (1799–1845) was an English author and journalist.

== Early life ==
William Frederick Deacon was the first child of six born to a fairly prosperous merchant of Tavistock Square, London. After attending Reading School, where his contemporary was Thomas Noon Talfourd, Deacon studied at St Catharine's College, Cambridge, where his studies seem to have been desultory. He left without a degree but while at college published a poem: "Hacho; or the Spell of St. Wilten", an imitation of Sir Walter Scott.

== Recognition ==
Encouraged by the positive reviews of his debut work, Deacon embarked on a prolific literary career. In 1820 and 1821 he was writing under a number of aliases for Gold and Northhouse's London Magazine and Monthly Critical and Dramatic Review, which had been set up as a rival to the more celebrated London Magazine published by Robert Baldwin, and whose other contributors included George Soane and Cornelius Webb. In October 1820 he added to his already taxing work load by editing, and almost wholly writing, a lively daily paper, The Déjeuné, or Companion for the Breakfast Table, extracts from which were frequently featured in Gold's. Unsurprisingly, this latter, rather demanding venture folded in December, and in June 1821 Gold's was itself bought out by the rival London Magazine. Deacon, exhausted by his literary efforts, retired for a while to a cottage in Llangadog, south Wales, from where he wrote to his mentor, Walter Scott, asking for advice on whether to continue as a writer. Scott advised him to pursue a steadier career outside literature, but Deacon ignored this advice and worked up some of the parodic material published in Gold's into his masterpiece, Warreniana, a compendious parodic survey of contemporary writing which imagines a world where the leading writers of the day become hirelings of the blacking (boot polish) manufacturer Robert Warren. The book was generally well received and there were several positive reviews. The Monthly Review praised the "considerable vivacity and success" of the volume, whilst the London Literary Gazette labelled it a "cleverly done" jeu d'esprit. His later books include November Nights or Tales for Winter Evenings (1826). He spent much of the last two decades of his relatively short life as a journalist for the True Sun.

== Works ==
- [William Frederick Deacon] (1835). The Exile of Erin; or, The Sorrows of a Bashful Irishman. London: Whittaker and Co., Ave Maria Lane. OCLC 1554008132. Volume I and volume II.
