= William Jerdan =

Scottish journalist (1782–1869)

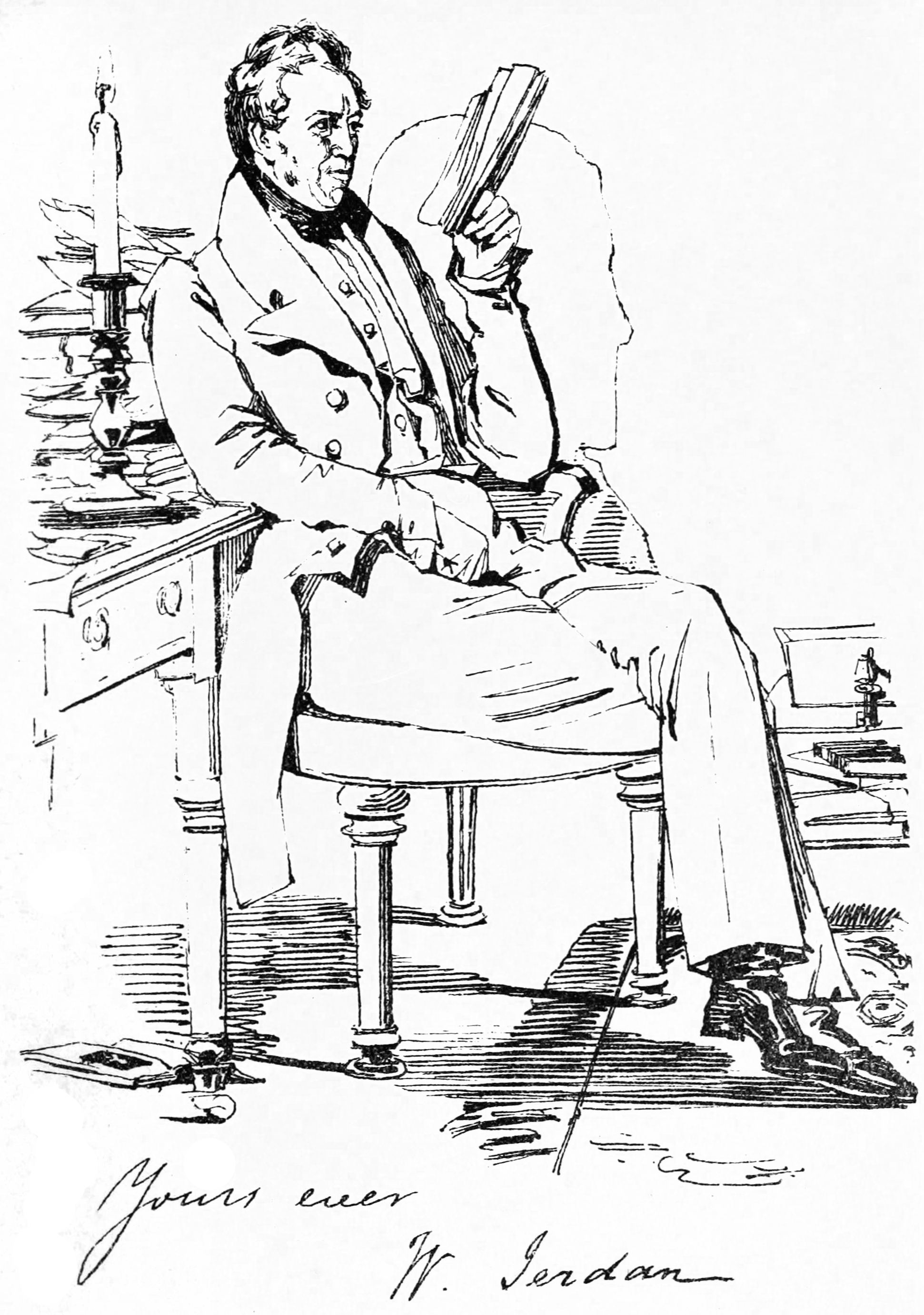

William Jerdan FSA (16 April 1782 – 11 July 1869), Scottish journalist, was born at Kelso, Scotland. During the years between 1799 and 1806, he spent short periods in a country lawyer's office, a London West India merchant's counting house, an Edinburgh solicitor's chambers, and held the position of surgeon's mate on board H.M. guardship Gladiator in Portsmouth Harbour, under his uncle, who was surgeon.

He went to London in 1806 and became a newspaper reporter. He was in the lobby of the House of Commons on 11 May 1812, when Spencer Perceval was shot, and was the first to seize the assassin. By 1812, he had become editor of The Sun, a semi-official Tory paper started by John Heriot in 1792; he was still there in 1815 and occasionally inserted literary articles, then quite an unusual proceeding; but a quarrel with the chief proprietor brought that engagement to a close in 1817. He passed next to the editor's chair of The Literary Gazette, which he conducted with success for thirty-four years.

Jerdan's position as editor brought him into contact with many distinguished writers. An account of his friends, among whom Canning was a special intimate, is to be found in his Men I have Known (1866); the men featured in the book include William Buckland, Samuel Taylor Coleridge, Edward Forbes, F.R.S. (with a colourful, eyewitness account of one of Forbes' early oceanographic dredging operations) and William Wordsworth. When Jerdan retired in 1850 from the editorship of The Literary Gazette, his pecuniary affairs were far from satisfactory. A testimonial of over £900 was subscribed by his friends; and in 1853 a government pension of 100 guineas was conferred on him by Lord Aberdeen. He published his Autobiography in four volumes from 1852 to 1853.

His grave in Bushey has a memorial sculpted by Joseph Durham.
