= John Herbert Caddy =

Canadian artist (1801–1883)

- Born: John Herbert Caddy; June 28, 1801; Quebec City, Lower Canada
- Died: March 19, 1883 (aged 81); Hamilton, Ontario
- Known for: artist, soldier, engineer, educator, diarist, explorer
- Spouse: Georgiana Hamilton (m. 1828)

John Herbert Caddy (June 28, 1801 – March 19, 1883) was a Canadian artist who painted watercolours, soldier, engineer, educator, diarist, and explorer.

== Career ==
Caddy was born in Quebec City, Lower Canada and at the age of 14 travelled to England for training at the Royal Military Academy, Woolwich as an engineer. While there he also learned topographical sketching and painting, as did other military men who were artists earlier such as George Heriot. He was promoted to 1st lieutenant in 1827.

Caddy subsequently travelled to the West Indies: Tobago (1828), St. Lucia (1833), St. Vincent (1834), to British Honduras (now Belize, 1838), to London, Province of Canada (1842) and finally, to Hamilton, Province of Canada (1851). In 1837, he had published a series he painted on the West Indies.

In 1839, he and Patrick Walker led an expedition to the Mayan city of Palenque. On his return, Caddy prepared a text and illustrations from his diary and sketches for a report which he meant to publish as a book. These, along with fragments of earlier diaries, were collected and published in 1967.

Caddy returned to Woolwich in 1841 as a captain. He chose London, Canada West as his next assignment. In 1844, he retired and got a job as a civil engineer for London. In this capacity, Caddy laid out plans for the growing community, and he acquired land in the town. He also began to paint Canadian landscapes, marines, animal and flowers.

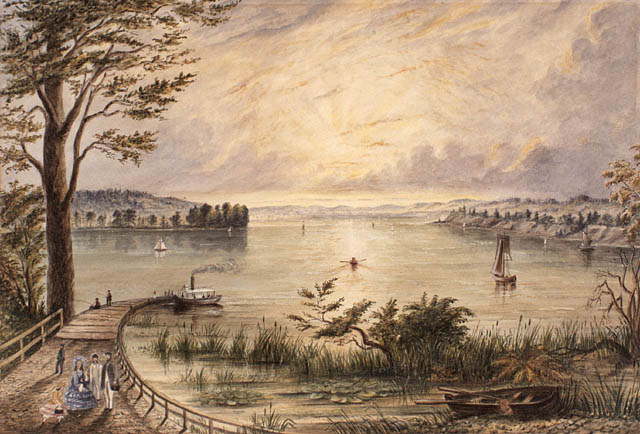
Hamilton Bay - John Herbert Caddy

In 1851, Captain Caddy moved to Hamilton where he lived until his death in 1883. He worked first as an engineer on the Great Western Rail Road, then became a full-time painter, concentrating on the Hamilton area but travelling to areas as far away as Lake Superior and New Brunswick.

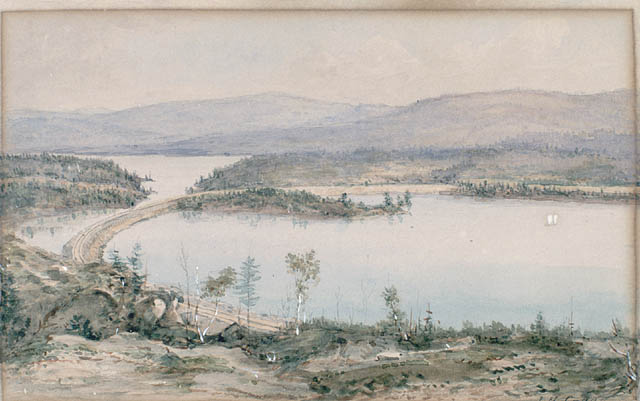
Jack Fish Bay, North Shore, Lake Superior - John Herbert Caddy

He opened a studio and served as an art instructor. He exhibited watercolours and oils in the annual provincial exhibitions from 1858 to 1868. Other members of Caddy's family were also artists.

== Public collections ==
His work is in the collections of Dundurn Castle in Hamilton, Ontario; the National Gallery of Canada; the Royal Ontario Museum, Library and Archives Canada, and the Art Gallery of Algoma.
