= The True Sun =

Daily newspaper serving London (1832–1837))

The True Sun was a London, pro-Whig, evening newspaper that was first published on 5 March 1832 and ceased publication in December 1837. It was published daily except Sundays.

In 1832–1834 Charles Dickens was a reporter for The True Sun.

In December 1833 Henry Hunt brought a libel action against the True Sun's proprietor Patrick Grant, publisher John Bell, and printer John Ager for an article published on 18 December 1832; however, Hunt was awarded damages of one farthing. Grant, Bell and Ager were prosecuted, convicted and confined in 1834 to the King's Bench Prison for advocating tax resistance against the British government's window tax.

In July 1835 D. Whittle Harvey purchased The True Sun. In 1837 Murdo Young purchased The True Sun from Whittle Harvey and a co-proprietor and merged it into his newspaper The Sun (which was published from 1792 to 1871).

== See also ==
- The Weekly True Sun
