= Art in Toronto =

Overview of the visual arts in Toronto, Canada

Art in Toronto encompasses the galleries, museums, public sculpture and street art of Toronto, Ontario.There is a vibrant art scene in the City of Toronto, consisting of numerous sculptures, galleries, markets, art museums, graffiti, and neighbourhoods.

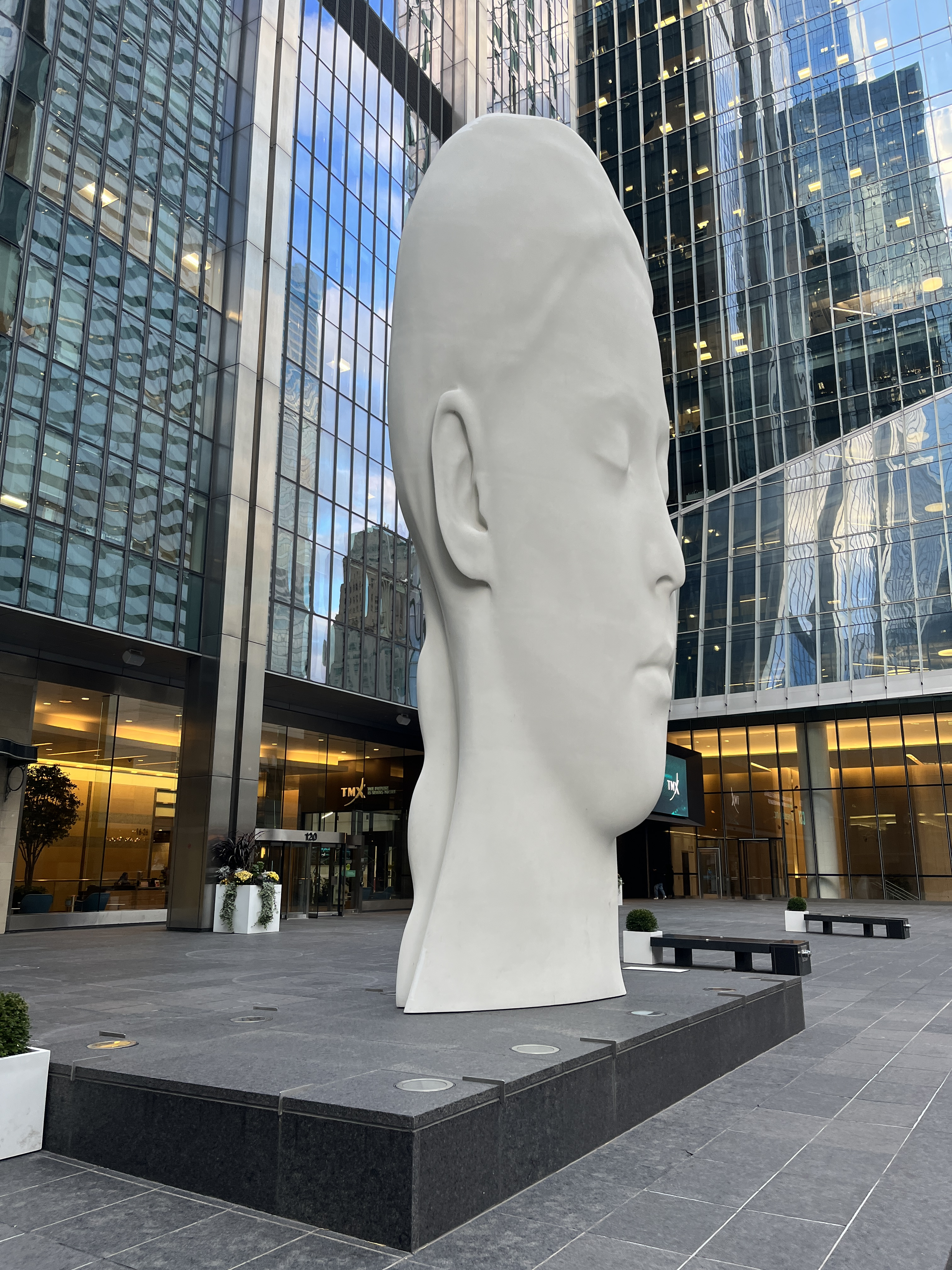
Dreaming

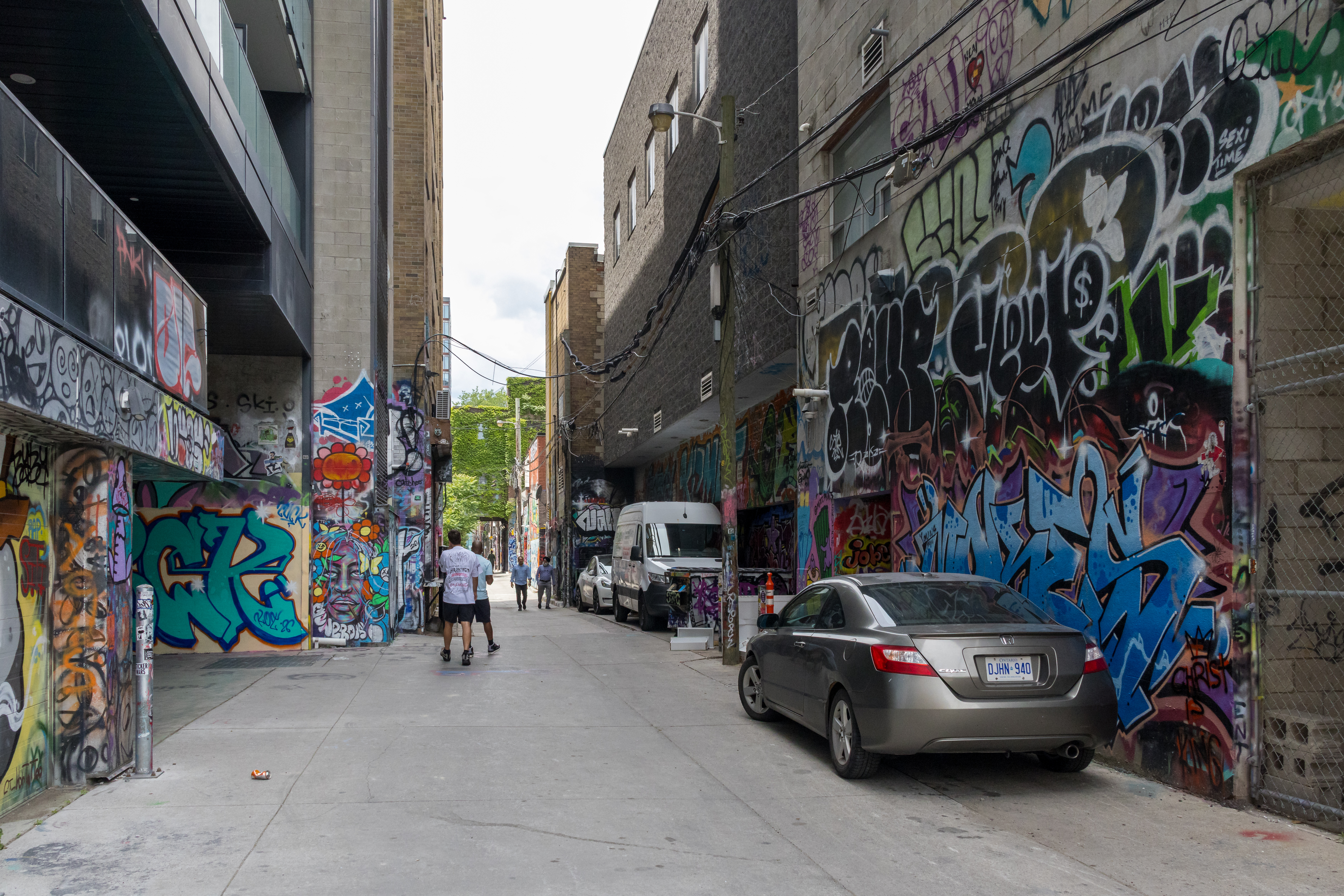
Graffiti Alley

== Art museums ==
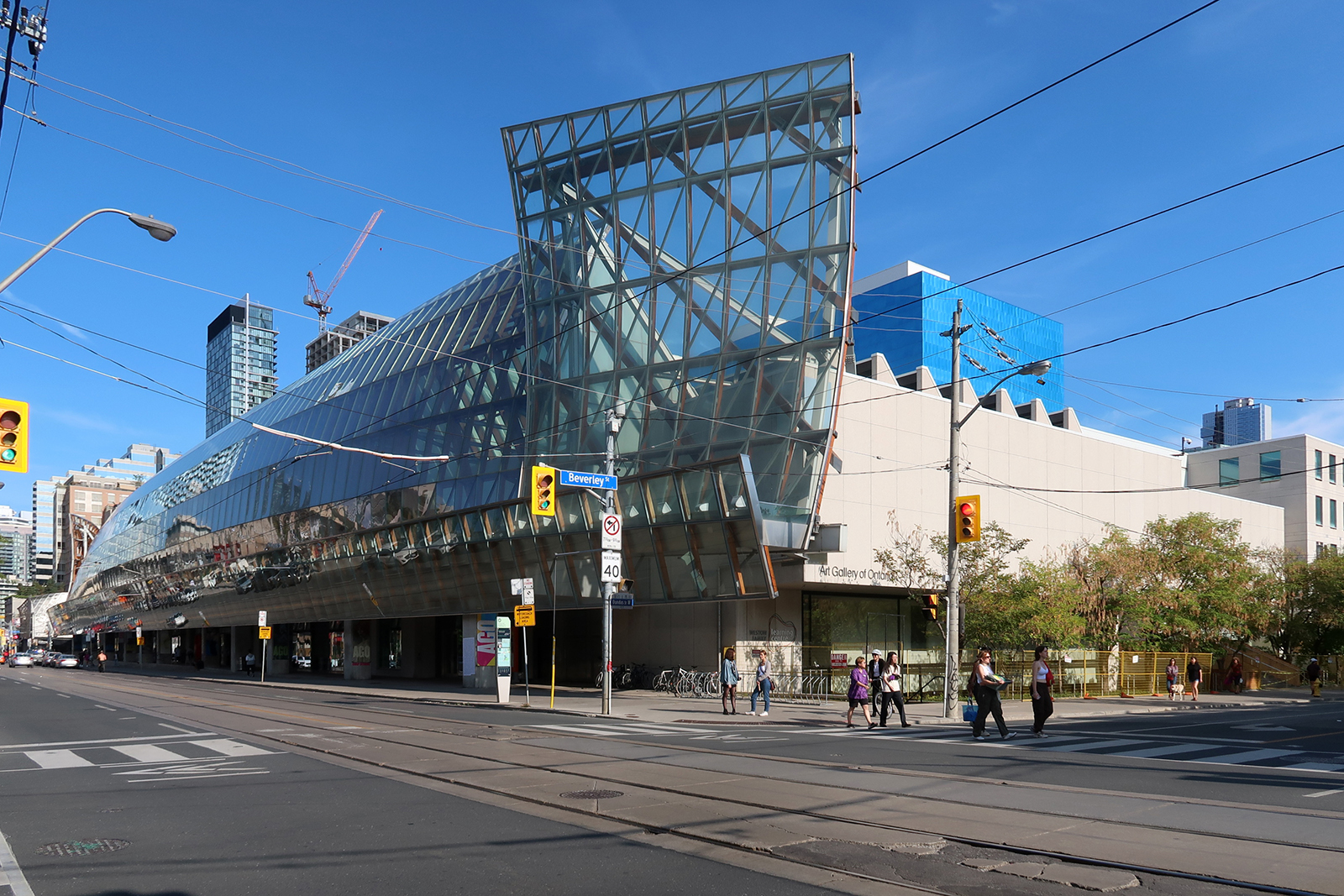
Art Gallery of Ontario

The Art Gallery of Ontario (AGO), located on Dundas Street West, is home to over 120,000 works. In addition there is also a ceramics museum called the Gardiner Museum, a contemporary art museum known as the Museum of Contemporary Art (MOCA), and the Art Museum at the University of Toronto.

== Education ==
OCAD University

The Ontario College of Art and Design University (OCAD U) is the widely considered to be a top arts university. Founded in 1876, it is the nation's oldest institution dedicated to art. Etobicoke School of the Arts is a publicly funded arts high school in Etobicoke deemed Toronto's best arts school by magazine Toronto Life.

== Art installations ==
Garden Car in Kensington Market

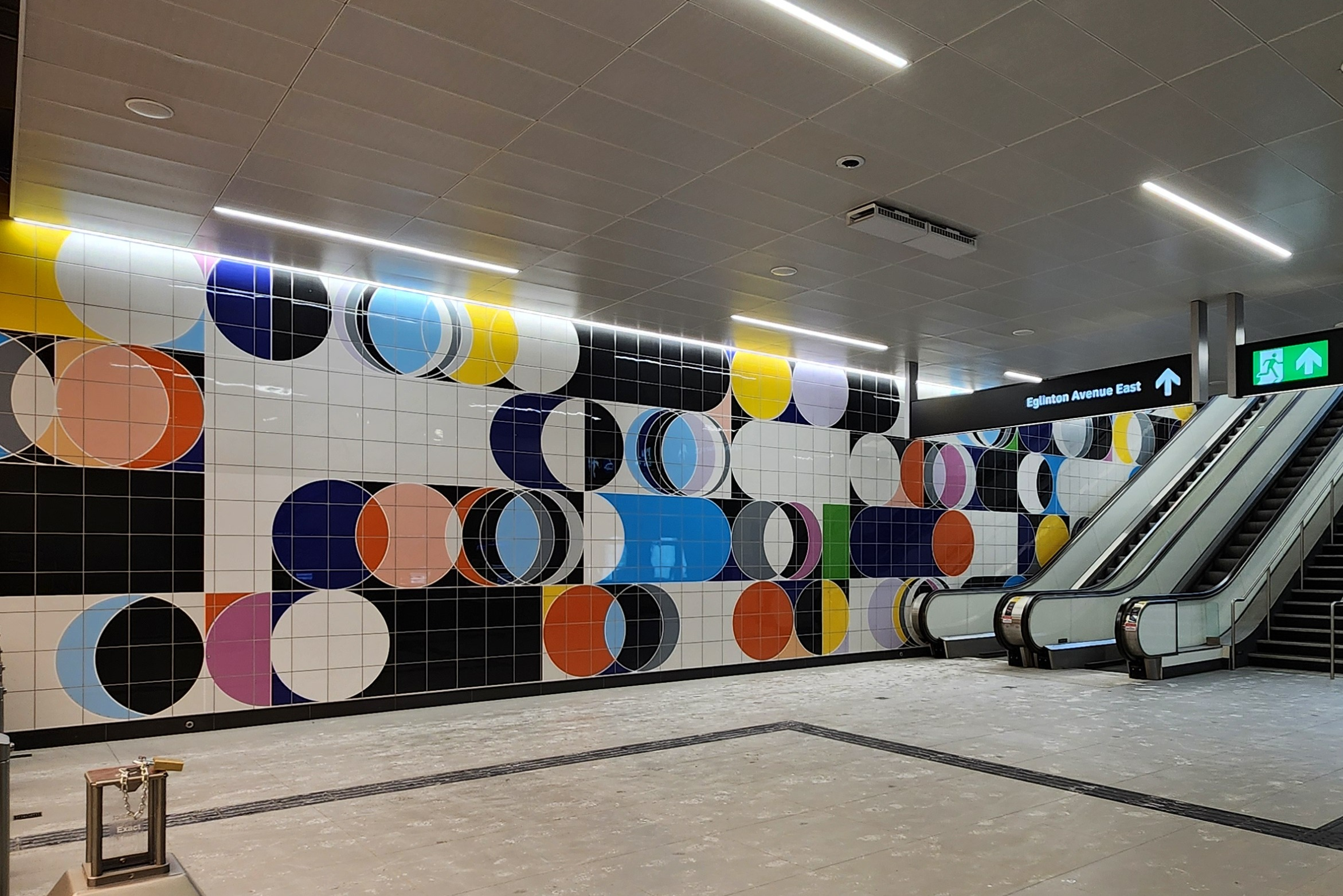
Art installation at a Toronto subway station
