= John Heriot (journalist) =

Scottish journalist and writer

John Heriot (22 April 1760 – 2 August 1833) was a Scottish journalist and writer.

He was forced to join the Royal Marines due to family hardship, and served as a junior officer during the American Revolutionary War. He was wounded in 1780 at the Battle of Martinique, and retired from the service in 1783; after living in financial difficulties for some years, he published two moderately successful novels in the 1780s, the second of which drew extensively on his experiences as a half-pay officer.

He was recruited as a pro-government journalist and pamphleteer in 1788, and placed on a salary the following year. He became the founder and sole editor of two pro-government daily newspapers, the Sun and the True Briton, which ran for over a decade, and eventually retired from journalistic work in 1806. He was appointed to a number of government posts, most significantly the comptrollership of Chelsea Hospital, the post he held at his death.

He was a distant relative of the philanthropist George Heriot, and the younger brother of the Scots-Canadian artist George Heriot.

== Early life ==
Heriot was born at Haddington in 1760, the second son of John Heriot, the sheriff clerk of the town, and his wife Marjory; his older brother was George Heriot, later to become a prominent artist. The Heriots were part of the long-established family of the Heriots of Trabroun, the most well-known member of which was the seventeenth-century goldsmith and philanthropist George Heriot. The family moved to Edinburgh in 1772, where Heriot attended the Edinburgh Royal High School; he had previously been educated at the Coldstream grammar school He studied at the University of Edinburgh after leaving the high school, but the collapse of his father's business in 1777 meant that he had to leave and seek employment.

He lived for three months with an uncle in Forres, where a member of the local gentry attempted to procure him a commission from the Duke of Dorset. This was unsuccessful, but it had the effect of directing Heriot towards a military career. Late in 1778, having failed to obtain a commission in Scotland, he travelled to London, where he was appointed a second lieutenant in the Royal Marines in November 1778.

He quickly arranged for sea duty - as the living expense of a shore posting was substantially more expensive to maintain - and was posted to HMS Vengeance, commanded by Captain Frederick Maitland. He served off the west coast of Africa and in the West Indies; when Captain Maitland left the Vengeance to take up command of HMS Elizabeth, Heriot was posted to HMS Preston. The Preston was an elderly fourth-rate ship, and Heriot quickly arranged to be transferred into the Elizabeth under Maitland. He first saw active fighting aboard the Elizabeth, in an attack on a convoy on 19 December 1779, and again at the Battle of Martinique on 16 April 1780, where he was wounded. He transferred to HMS Brune in July, commanded by Francis Hartwell, and was aboard her during the Great Hurricane in October 1780. He was appointed a first lieutenant of marines in August 1781, after the Brune had been paid off, and was later posted to HMS Salisbury and HMS Alexander, before being put on half-pay at the cessation of hostilities in 1783.

== Writing career ==
Heriot, now living in London, had mortgaged his pay to help support his parents, and was without any source of income. In an attempt to support himself, he wrote two novels - The Sorrows of the Heart (1787), and The Half-Pay Officer (1789), the latter of which was semi-autobiographical. These raised enough to support him for two years, during which time he married Alison Shiriff, with whom he had two daughters.

He was hired as one of a number of journalists who wrote pamphlets and newspaper articles in support of the government during the winter of 1788–89, when George III's insanity had become a matter of very contentious debate. After the insanity crisis had passed, he was put on a permanent salary to continue this work; by 1791, he was drawing an annual salary of £200. He was briefly involved with the Sierra Leone Company in 1791, but resigned the office of secretary shortly thereafter.

He worked for the Oracle and the World newspapers in 1791, editing both, but did not remain in either post for long. In 1792, at the instigation of Edmund Burke, he was recruited by the Treasury to establish a pro-government newspaper, the Sun. This was secretly funded by members of the government, on a private basis; Heriot launched it on 1 October 1792, and it quickly rose to become the second most popular newspaper in the country, behind The Times. He then launched the True Briton, a morning daily, on 1 January 1793; it, too, was funded by the Treasury and maintained a strongly pro-government pro-Tory line. The True Briton continued for eleven years before collapsing, whilst the Sun survived until Heriot retired in 1806.

He continued to write during this period, including a history of Gibraltar (1792) to accompany a work by the artist Antonio de Poggi, and an account of the Battle of the Nile (1798). He was closely connected with the governing circles of the day, and through his personal connections with Pitt the Younger was able to secure two important government posts for his brother George in Upper Canada.

He left newspaper work in 1806 and became a commissioner for the lottery; in 1810 he was made an Army deputy paymaster-general in the West Indies; and in 1816 the comptroller of Chelsea Hospital. He died in 1833, of "sudden paralysis", three days after his wife.

== Bibliography ==
Heriot wrote two novels, both published anonymously.

- The sorrows of the heart : a novel. London: printed for J. Murray. 1787. (2 vols.; ESTC reference T73503)
- The Half-pay officer : or, memoirs of Charles Chanceley : a novel. London: printed for the author, by T. Bensley, and sold by G.G.J. and J. Robinson. 1788. (3 vols.; ESTC reference N51017)

The first of these was translated into French:

- Horton et Mathilde. Paris: chez Letelli. 1789. (2 vols.; ESTC reference T152029)

The publisher is given as "Londres", but it is noted by the English Short Title Catalogue that it was probably published in Paris.

He also wrote a history of Gibraltar, published under his own name:

- An historical sketch of Gibraltar, with an account of the siege which that fortress stood against the combined forces of France and Spain : including a minute and circumstantial detail of the sortie made by the garrison on the morning of Nov. 27, 1781, for the purpose of destroying the formidable works erected by the Spaniards against that fortress. London: printed by B. Millan, printer to his Royal Highness the Prince of Wales, for J. Edwards, Pall-Mall, T. and J. Egerton, White-Hall, and W. Faden, geographer to the King, Strand. 1792. (1 vol.; ESTC reference T154473) Digitised copy at Internet Archive
