= James Pattison Cockburn =

British painter (1779–1847)

Major-General James Pattison Cockburn
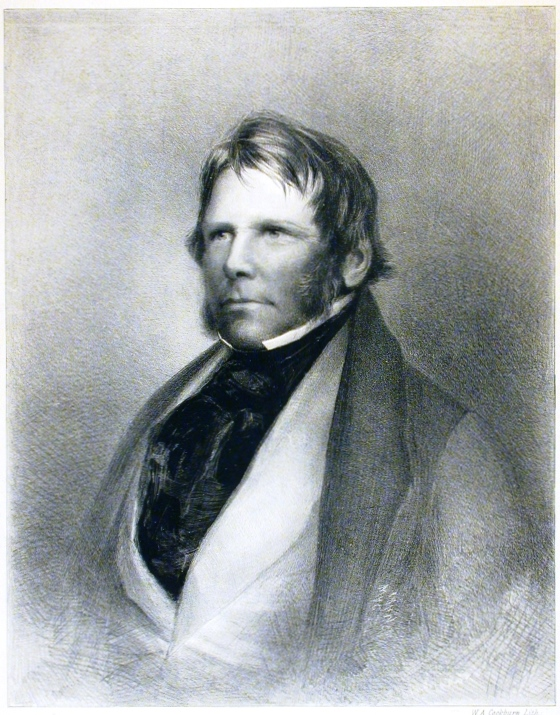
- Portrait by William A. Cockburn
- Born: 18 March 1779
- Died: 18 March 1847 (aged 68); Woolwich, London, England

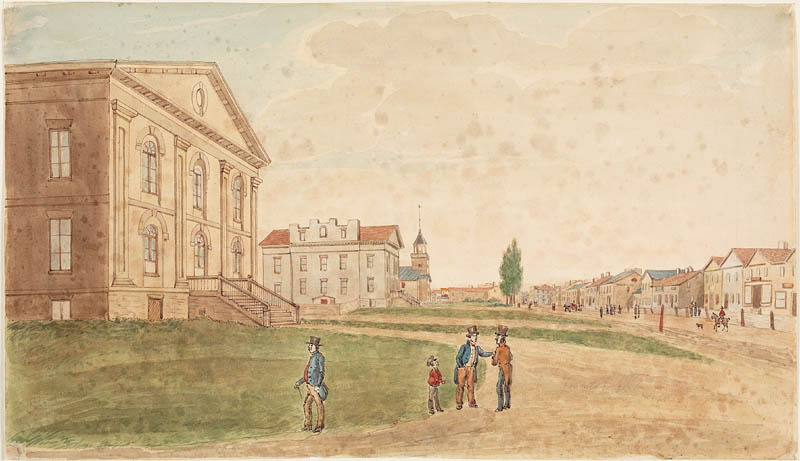
York, capital of Upper Canada, showing Court House and Jail, August 1829

James Pattison Cockburn (18 March 1779 – 18 March 1847) was a British Army officer, artist and author. He was born into a military family and received his military training at the Royal Military Academy, Woolwich where he learned to draw as part of his education in topography. His artistic talent resulted in a prolific portfolio of paintings capturing the landscapes and cities throughout which he travelled during his military service, including many Canadian locations such as Quebec City.

== Life ==
Cockburn had a long military career and retired with the rank of Major-General. Throughout his time in the army, which took him to many parts of the world, he sketched and produced a steady flow of travel books which he illustrated himself. They include A Voyage to Cádiz and Gibraltar, with 30 coloured plates, published in 1815; Swiss Scenery, with 62 plates, in 1820; The Route of the Simplon, in 1822; The Valley of Aosta, in 1823 and Pompeii Illustrated, in folio, in 1827.

Cockburn spent two periods stationed in Quebec City, Canada, during his military career. The first, from November 1822 to June 1823, produced little artwork that has survived. His second posting, lasting from April 1826 to August 1832, proved to be artistically prolific. Many works from this "mature" period cover subjects from both Upper Canada and Lower Canada with Quebec City and Niagara Falls as the subjects of his finest work. He is renowned for his precise, faithful representations of Quebec City, which capture the spirit of the city and have lived on as invalubale records of the early nineteenth century in Quebec and Canada.

Cockburn finished his career as the director of the laboratory of the Royal Arsenal at Woolwich where he died. His body of work is large and has yet to be reconstructed in a comprehensive manner for more in-depth study.

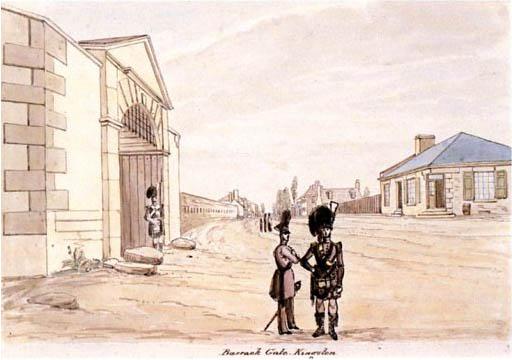
View of entrance to the Tête-de-Pont Barracks (Fort Frontenac), Kingston, Ontario, ca. 1830.

"Passenger Pigeon Net, St. Anne's, Lower Canada". Watercolour and pen and black and brown ink on wove paper (1829).

== Record sale prices ==
At the Cowley Abbott Spring Live Auction: Select Masterworks of Canadian and International Art, lot 40, Cockburn's The Lower Town and King's Wharf from the Upper Town, Quebec, (1833), 15.75 × 22 in, estimate: CA$10,000 - CA$15,000, sold for $133,250 (including Buyer's Premium).

== Other references ==
- "James Pattison Cockburn". Dictionary of Canadian Biography (online ed.). University of Toronto Press. 1979–2016.
- Chichester, Henry Manners (1887). "Cockburn, James Pattison" . In Stephen, Leslie (ed.). Dictionary of National Biography. Vol. 11. London: Smith, Elder & Co. p. 188.

Attribution:
