= CCB =

CCB may refer to:

== Culture and religion ==
- Centro Cultural de Belém, a building with cultural facilities in Portugal
- Centro Cultural Brasileiro
- Christian Community Bible, a family of translations of the Christian Bible
- Christian Congregation in Brazil, (Portuguese: Congregação Cristã no Brasil) is a Brazilian evangelical denomination
- Christian Council of Britain, an organization which campaigns against Islam
- Communität Christusbruderschaft Selbitz, a German Lutheran Religious Order
- C-C-B, Japanese pop-rock band

== Economics and finance ==
- Central Carolina Bank and Trust, formerly headquartered in Durham, North Carolina
- China Construction Bank, founded in the People's Republic of China in October, 1954
- China Construction Bank (Asia), the former Bank of Canton, founded in Hong Kong in 1912

== Government and military ==
- Canada Child Benefit
- Canadian Competition Bureau
- Cape Cod Bay
- Center for Cybersecurity in Belgium
- Civil Cooperation Bureau, an apartheid-era covert hit squad
- City-County Building, a government office building which serves as Indianapolis, Indiana's city hall
- Close Combat Badge, a US Army badge that was never issued
- Combat Command-B, a level of military organization employed by the US Army from 1942 to 1963
- Coastal Command Boat, a prototype variant of the Mark VI patrol boat of the US Navy
- Combined Communications Board, original name of the CCEB military communications organisation
- Copyright Claims Board, a small claims tribunal in the United States
- Consent and Capacity Board, an Ontario adjudicative tribunal

== Science, medicine, and technology ==
- Calcium channel blocker, a class of drugs
- Center for Computational Biology, an NIH-funded center
- Centre for Cancer Biology at SA Pathology in Adelaide, Australia
- Change control board, (or Configuration Control Board), a committee that makes decisions on proposed changes to software projects
- Climate, Community & Biodiversity Alliance, which promotes development of responsible land management activities
- Coal combustion byproducts, such as fly ash
- Cold conveyor belt, a counterpart to the warm conveyor belt in certain cyclone models
- Common Core Booster, first stage of the Atlas V rocket
- Critical Care Bypass, a hospital emergency code
- Crowd control barrier, a device used to control the movement of people
- Computer Control Bus a proprietary interface of Sanyo
- Community Centered Board, an organization that fits an individual who needs medical support, to facilities that can assist said individual.
- Carbon Ceramic Brakes, high performance brakes with ceramic engineering

== Other uses ==
- Clarens–Chailly–Blonay Railway, a former railway company in Switzerland
- Cable Airport (IATA airport code CCB) in Upland, California
- Cross car beam, structural member located under the instrument panel of most vehicles

== See also ==
- CB (disambiguation)
- CBB (disambiguation)
- C2B
- 2cb
