= Camp B'nai Brith =

Camp Massad may refer to:

- B'nai B'rith Beber Camp, a Jewish summer camp in Mukwonago, Wisconsin
- Camp B'nai Brith of Montreal, a Jewish summer camp near Lantier, Quebec
- Camp B'nai Brith of Ottawa, a Jewish summer camp near Quyon, Quebec
- B'nai B'rith Perlman Camp, a Jewish summer camp in Wayne County, Pennsylvania
