= CBCB =

CBCB may refer to:

- CBCB-FM, a Canadian radio station
- CBCB-TV, a Canadian television station
- Catholic Bishops' Conference of Bangladesh
- Chess Boxing Club Berlin for chess boxing

== See also ==
- 2CBCB-NBOMe (NBOMe-TCB-2), a hallucinogen
- CB (disambiguation)
- 2C-B
- CB2 (disambiguation)
