= CBB =

CBB may refer to:

== Banks ==
- CBB Bank, an American bank
- Central Bank of Bahrain
- Central Bank of Barbados
- Central Bank of Belize

== Entertainment and media ==
- Celebrity Big Brother (British TV series), a British reality television show
- Comedy Bang! Bang!, a podcast
  - Comedy Bang! Bang! (TV series), a television adaptation

== Sport ==
- Brazilian Basketball Confederation (Spanish: Confederação Brasileira de Basketball)
- Canterbury-Bankstown Bulldogs, an Australian rugby league team
- Colby-Bates-Bowdoin Consortium, an American college athletic association

== Technology ==
- Cincinnati Bell, doing business as Altafiber, an American telecommunication company
- Common Building Block, a set of standards for laptop components
- Community bulletin board
- Connexion by Boeing, an in-flight Wi-Fi provider

== Transport ==
- Carbis Bay railway station, Cornwall, England
- Chesapeake Bay Bridge, Maryland, United States
- Chibi North railway station, Hubei, China
- Cibeber railway station, Cianjur Regency, West Java, Indonesia
- Jorge Wilstermann International Airport Cochabamba, Bolivia

== Other uses ==
- Calvin–Benson–Bassham cycle, in photosynthesis
- Camp B'nai Brith (Montreal), a Jewish summer camp near Lantier, Quebec
- Camp B'nai Brith (Ottawa), a Jewish summer camp near Quyon, Quebec
- Coomassie brilliant blue, a dye
