= Glenmore railway station (Indonesia) =

Railway station in Indonesia

Glenmore Station Stasiun Glenmore
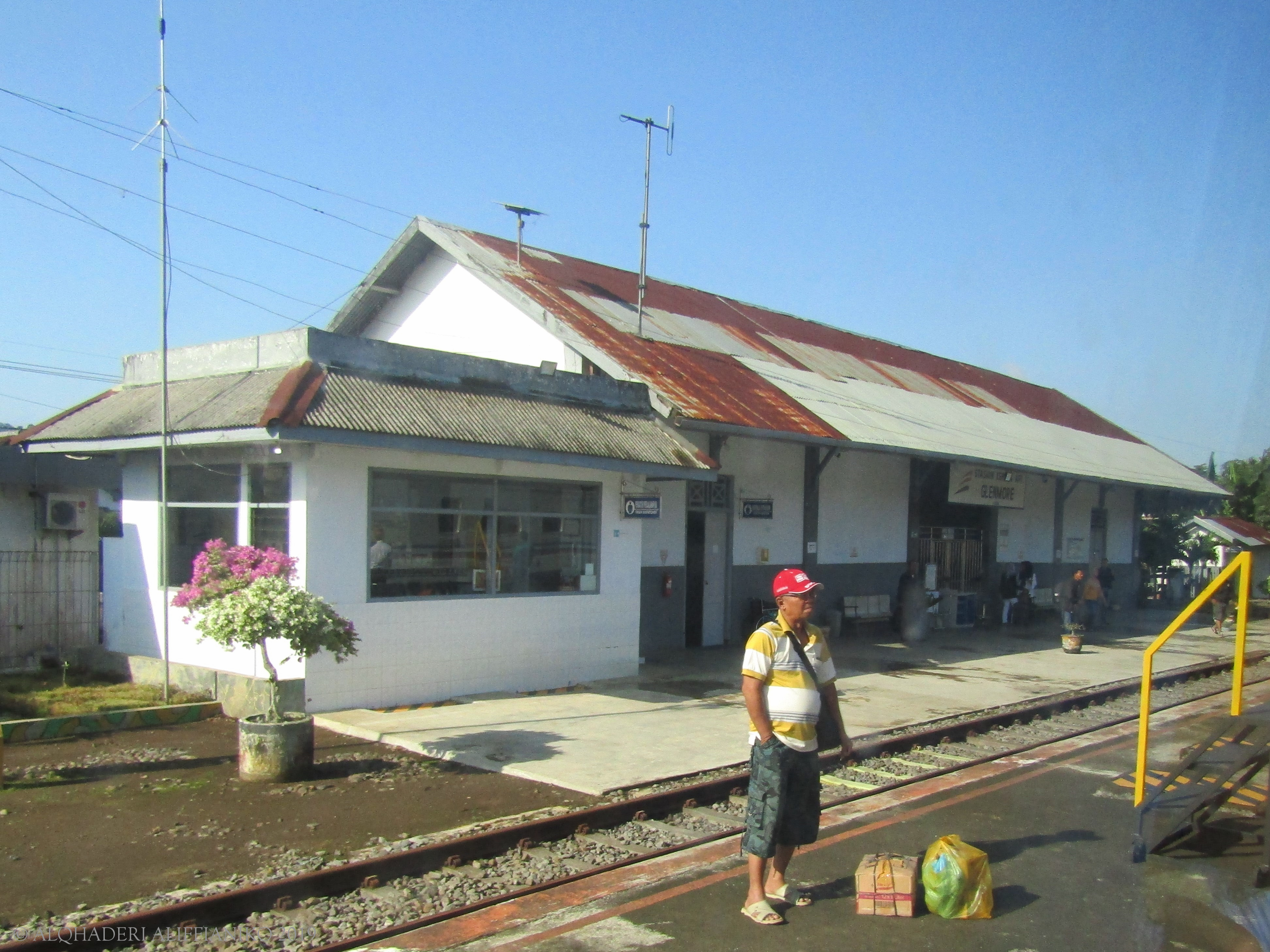
- Glenmore Station

General information
- Location: Sepanjang, Glenmore, Banyuwangi Regency; East Java; Indonesia
- Coordinates: 8.29957°S 114.049°E
- Elevation: +342 m (1,122 ft)
- Owner: Kereta Api Indonesia
- Operator: Kereta Api Indonesia
- Line: Kalisat–Banyuwangi
- Platforms: 1 island platform 1 side platform
- Tracks: 2

Construction
- Structure type: Ground
- Parking: Available
- Accessible: Available

Other information
- Station code: GLM
- Classification: Class III

History
- Opened: 2 February 1903
Location
- Location within Banyuwangi Regency

Glenmore Station (GLM) is a class III railway station located in Sepanjang, Glenmore, Banyuwangi Regency. This station is included in the Operational Area IX Jember at an altitude of +342 m. This station only has two railway tracks with track 2 being a straight line. This station is in the center of Glenmore district so it is quite busy even though it is far from the provincial highway. As a class III station, this station only serves economy class passenger trains.

The station's main building, which is a legacy of Staatsspoorwegen, is now designated as a cultural heritage by the Center for Conservation and Architectural Design Unit of Kereta Api Indonesia.

== Services ==
The following is a list of train services at the Glenmore Station.

=== Passenger services ===
- Economy class
  - Sri Tanjung, towards Surabaya Gubeng via Jombang–Madiun–Purwosari and towards Ketapang
  - Tawang Alun, towards Bangil and towards Ketapang
  - Probowangi, towards Surabaya Gubeng and towards Ketapang
  - Pandanwangi, towards Jember and towards Ketapang

Preceding station	Kereta Api Indonesia	Following station
Krikilan towards Kalisat	Kalisat–Banyuwangi	Kempit towards Ketapang
