= Glenmore railway station =

Glenmore railway station may also refer to:

- Glenmore railway station (Indonesia), a railway station in Glenmore, Banyuwangi Regency, Indonesia.
- Glenmore railway station (Ireland), a railway station in Glenmore, County Donegal, Ireland.
