= CB2 =

CB2 or similar, may refer to:

- Cannabinoid receptor type 2
- Crash Bandicoot 2: Cortex Strikes Back, a video game developed by Naughty Dog for PlayStation
- CB2, a division of Crate & Barrel
- Child-robot with Biomimetic Body, a robot at the Osaka University that mimics infant learning.
- USS Guam (CB-2)

== See also ==
- CB (disambiguation)
- CBB (disambiguation)
