= Purworejo railway station =

Railway station in Indonesia

Purworejo Station Stasiun Purworejo
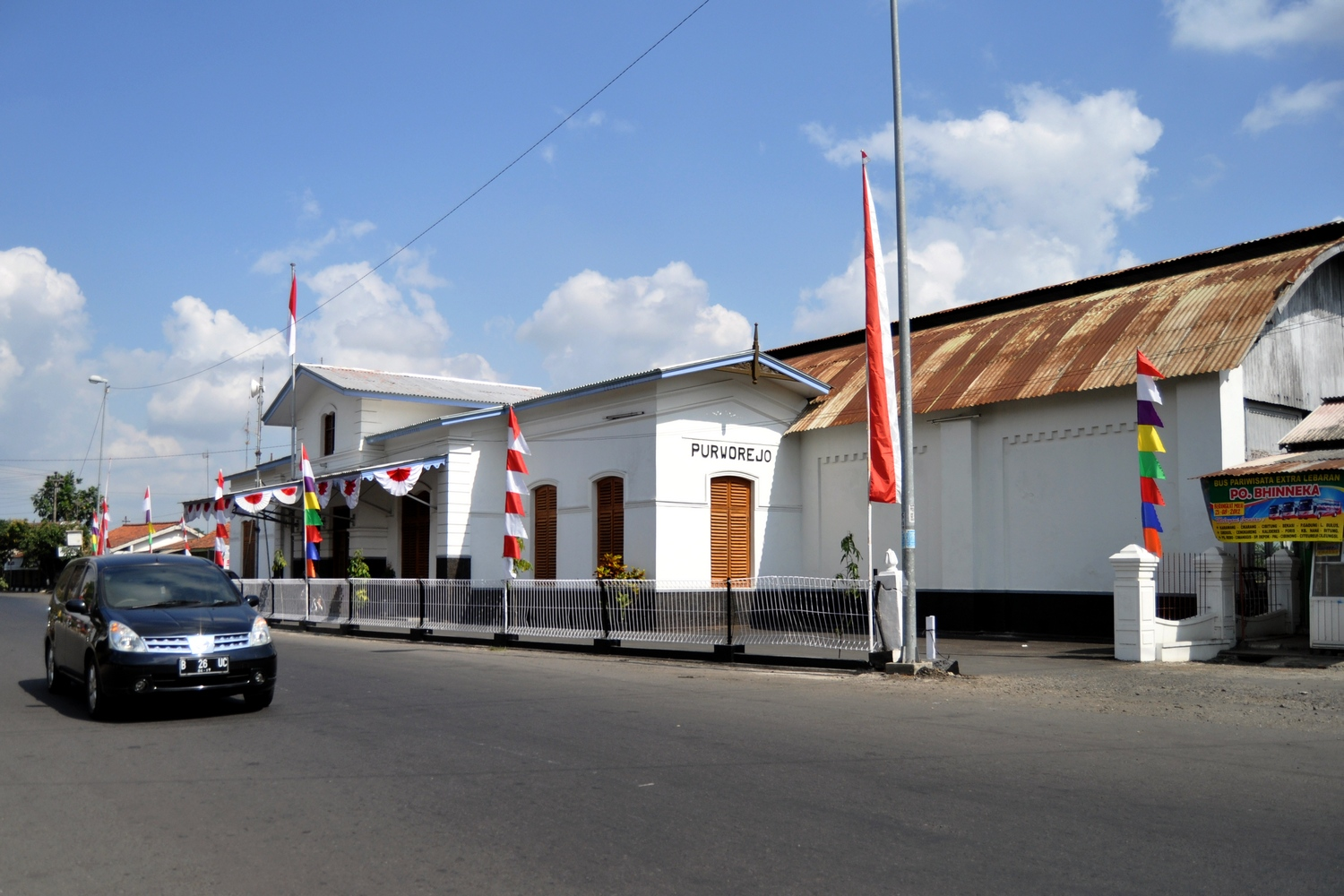
- Purworejo Station in 2012

General information
- Location: Jalan Mayjend Sutoyo, Purworejo, Purworejo, Purworejo Regency, Central Java, Indonesia
- Coordinates: 7.7086399°S 110.0111633°E
- Elevation: +63m
- Owner: Kereta Api Indonesia
- Manager: Kereta Api Indonesia
- Line: Kutoarjo–Purworejo (closed)
- Platforms: 1 side platform 1 island platform
- Tracks: 2

Other information
- Station code: PWR • 2050
- Classification: Class II
Location
- Location within Java

Purworejo Station (PWR) is an inactive class II railway station located in the town of Purworejo, Purworejo Regency, Central Java, Indonesia. The station is located at an altitude of +63 meters and is the easternmost station located in Operation Area V Purwokerto. The station has been closed since 2010. Starting in June 2023, the station and the railway line to Kutoarjo Station wiil be reactivated.

Preceding station	Kereta Api Indonesia	Following station
Kutoarjo towards Kroya	Kroya–Kutoarjo–Purworejo	Terminus
