= Bronfman Jewish Education Centre =

Canadian Jewish education coordination agency

The Bronfman Jewish Education Centre (BJEC) is the planning and coordinating agency for Jewish community educational needs in Montreal, Quebec, Canada.

== Description ==
A constituent agency of the Federation CJA, BJEC strives to respond to the educational needs of 20 elementary schools, 14 secondary schools, 900 educators, 7100 day school students, over 500 students in 4 supplementary schools, and a growing array of community organizations.

BJEC offers professional development, pedagogical resources, educational consultation, and instructional, technical, and educational services to schools and community organizations. These resources provide a support system for teachers, administrators, and students in a variety of settings, offering the Jewish community high quality educational opportunities.

BJEC also manages a world-renowned Curriculum Development Department, the Bronfman Israel Experience Centre and the Florence Melton Adult Mini-School.
