= Federation CJA =

Canadian Jewish organization

- Formation: 1916
- Type: Organizations based in Canada
- Legal status: active
- Headquarters: Montreal, Quebec, Canada
- Region served: Canada
- Official language: English, French, Hebrew
- CEO: Yair Szlak
- Website: www.federationcja.org

Federation CJA is a Montreal based Jewish community organization. Their mission is to "preserve and strengthen the quality of Jewish life and engagement in Montreal, Israel, and the world". Federation CJA is a part of the Jewish Federations of North America.

== History ==
Federation CJA is one of the oldest Canadian Jewish organizations. CJA was founded in 1916 with the hope of uniting Montreal's Jewish community and providing a central fundraising organization to serve the 14 founding organizations. It has been involved in major issues facing the community, such as government restrictions on immigration beginning in the 1920s, extreme poverty during the Great Depression, the rise of fascism in Europe and Quebec during the thirties, the Second World War and assisting the remnants of European Jewry, the birth of the State of Israel, waves of immigration including especially Holocaust survivors, Sephardic Jews and Hungarians after the 1956 uprising, the rise of the separatist movements and outward immigration, particularly of young Jews that followed in the late '70s and '80s, as well as fighting antisemitism and assisting in meeting the needs of the most vulnerable in Montreal, Israel, and in other communities under threat around the world.

== Fundraising ==
Combined Jewish Appeal (CJA) is the fundraising arm of Federation CJA, with over 18,000 donors to the annual campaign supporting various local, national, and overseas programs and activities.

== Community ==
As a community organization, it mobilizes thousands of volunteers who devote their time and energy to raising funds, allocating the proceeds, and assisting in the delivery of services. It is one of 156 North American Jewish federations, a member of the United Israel Appeal Federations Canada, the Jewish Federations of North America, and a contributor to the Jewish Agency for Israel. Federation CJA is also affiliated with the Canadian Council for Israel and Jewish Advocacy.

== Agencies ==
Constituent agencies of Federation CJA include Agence Ometz, Bronfman Jewish Education Centre, Camp B'nai B'rith, Communauté sépharade unifiée du Québec (United Sefardic Community of Quebec), Cummings Jewish Centre for Seniors, Hillel Montreal, JEM Workshop Inc., Jewish Public Library, Montreal Holocaust Museum, the Segal Centre for Performing Arts, as well as the YM-YWHA Montreal Jewish Community Centres.

== Controversies ==
CJA is connected with other groups such as Hillel International. Hillel International has a presence on college campuses to support Jewish students in their college life and to support their connection to Israel as part of their identity.

== New leadership ==
In its vision of the future, the director of CJA believes that the Federation CJA must be more inclusive and recognize all Jews in a diverse Jewish population of Montreal. Past-President of Federation CJA, Marc Gold, said "the federation recognizes that it must be open to change to be relevant to Montreal Jews, especially the younger generation and those not involved with the organized community, and recognize that all Jews in a diverse Jewish population of Montreal."

== Notable people ==
- Charles Shahar, Federation chief researcher
