= Charles Shahar =

Canadian demographer

- Scientific career
- Fields: Sociology, demographics
- Institutions: Federation CJA

Charles Shahar is a Canadian demographer. He is the chief researcher for Federation CJA, a Canadian Jewish organization based in Montreal, Quebec. Shahar has conducted studies on Canadian Jews, as well as the first comprehensive community study of Hasidic Jews in Canada. He has conducted a comprehensive series of analyses of the 2001 Census, and more recently of the 2011 National Household Survey, along various themes.

== Demographic research ==
Charles Shahar has conducted a number of studies on the Canadian Jewish Community. The majority were conducted as a secondary analysis of Canadian census data.

=== 2003 study of Montreal Hasidim ===
Shahar conducted the first comprehensive community study of Hasidic Jews in Canada. Shahar's 2003 study was sponsored by the Federation CJA, the Jewish Federation of Greater Montreal. The study is the first to include significant quantitative sample of a Hasidim in North America.

The study focused on the Orthodox community in Outremont, Montreal. A large portion of which identify as Hasidim. The study was also the first to include a significant sample of Chabad Hasidim.

To ensure greater response rate, Shahar procured letters from local community rabbis, requesting the community to answer the survey questionnaire. The survey had an 83% response rate, high by methodological standards.

==== Findings ====
Among Shahar's findings are an estimate for the number of Orthodox in Montreal, the average household size and fertility rates of specific Orthodox and Hasidic groups.
