= Situbondo railway station =

Railway station in Indonesia

Situbondo Station Stasiun Situbondo
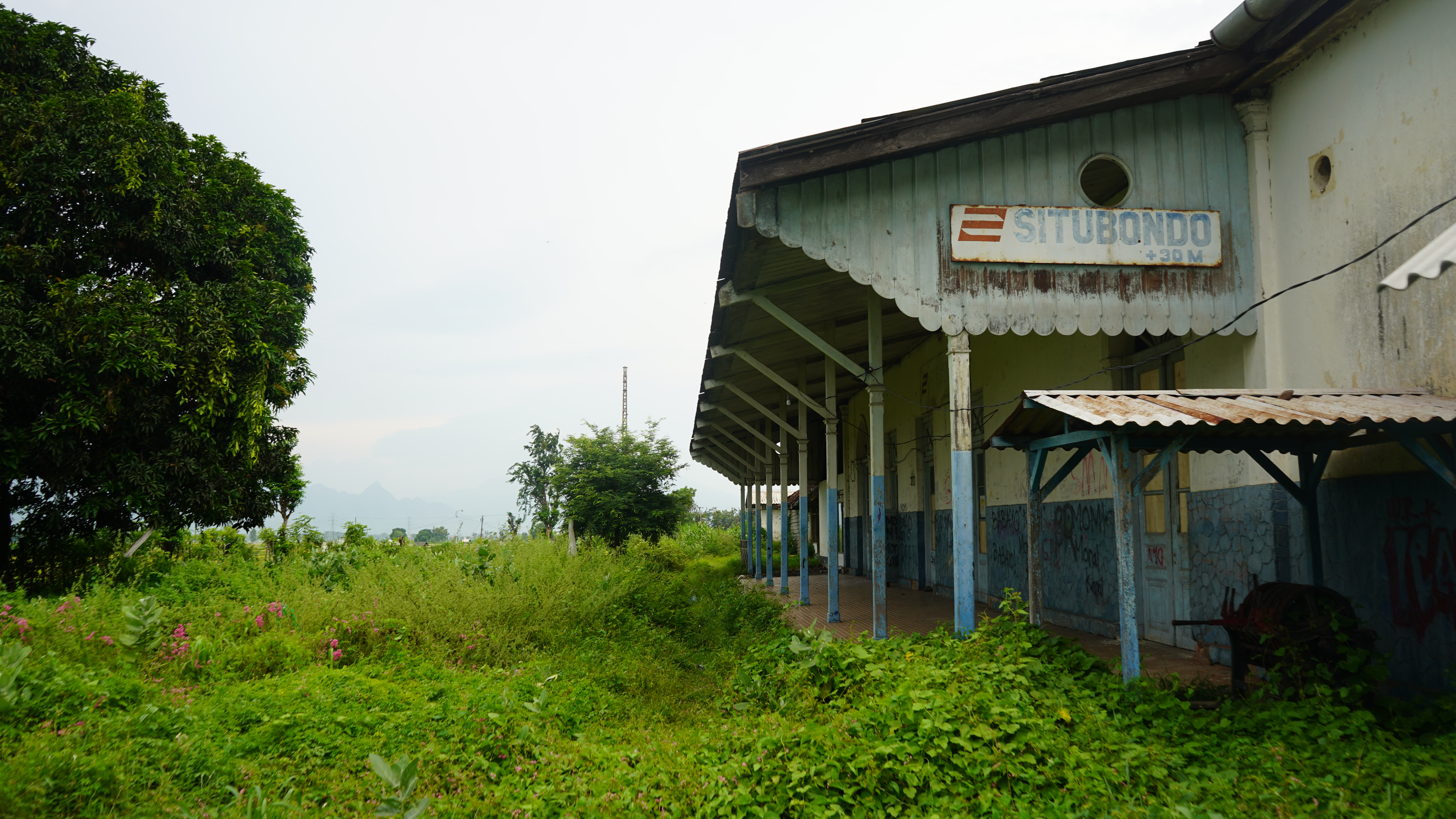
- The rail yard of Situbondo Station photographed during a survey conducted by the Directorate General of Railways together with the Indonesian Railway Preservation Society (IRPS) in 2024

General information
- Other names: Sumberkolak Station
- Location: Sumberkolak, Panarukan, Situbondo Regency; East Java; Indonesia
- Coordinates: 7.7139361°S 113.9948522°E
- Elevation: 30 m (98 ft)
- Owner: Kereta Api Indonesia
- Operator: Kereta Api Indonesia (WPA 9)
- Line: Surabaya Kota–Probolinggo–Kalisat–Panarukan line
- Tracks: 4

Construction
- Structure type: Ground

Other information
- Status: Closed
- Station code: SIT

History
- Opened: 1 October 1897
- Closed: 2004
- Former names: Station Soemberkolak
Location
- Location within East Java

Situbondo Station (SIT), also known as Sumberkolak Station, is a closed railway station located in Sumberkolak, Panarukan, Situbondo Regency.

The station, situated at an elevation of +30 meters, is managed by Kereta Api Indonesia under the supervision of Asset Protection Region IX Jember, although the asset ownership belongs to the Directorate General of Railways of the Ministry of Transportation. The station is also the closest railway station to Situbondo Town, the administrative center of the Situbondo Regency.

== History ==
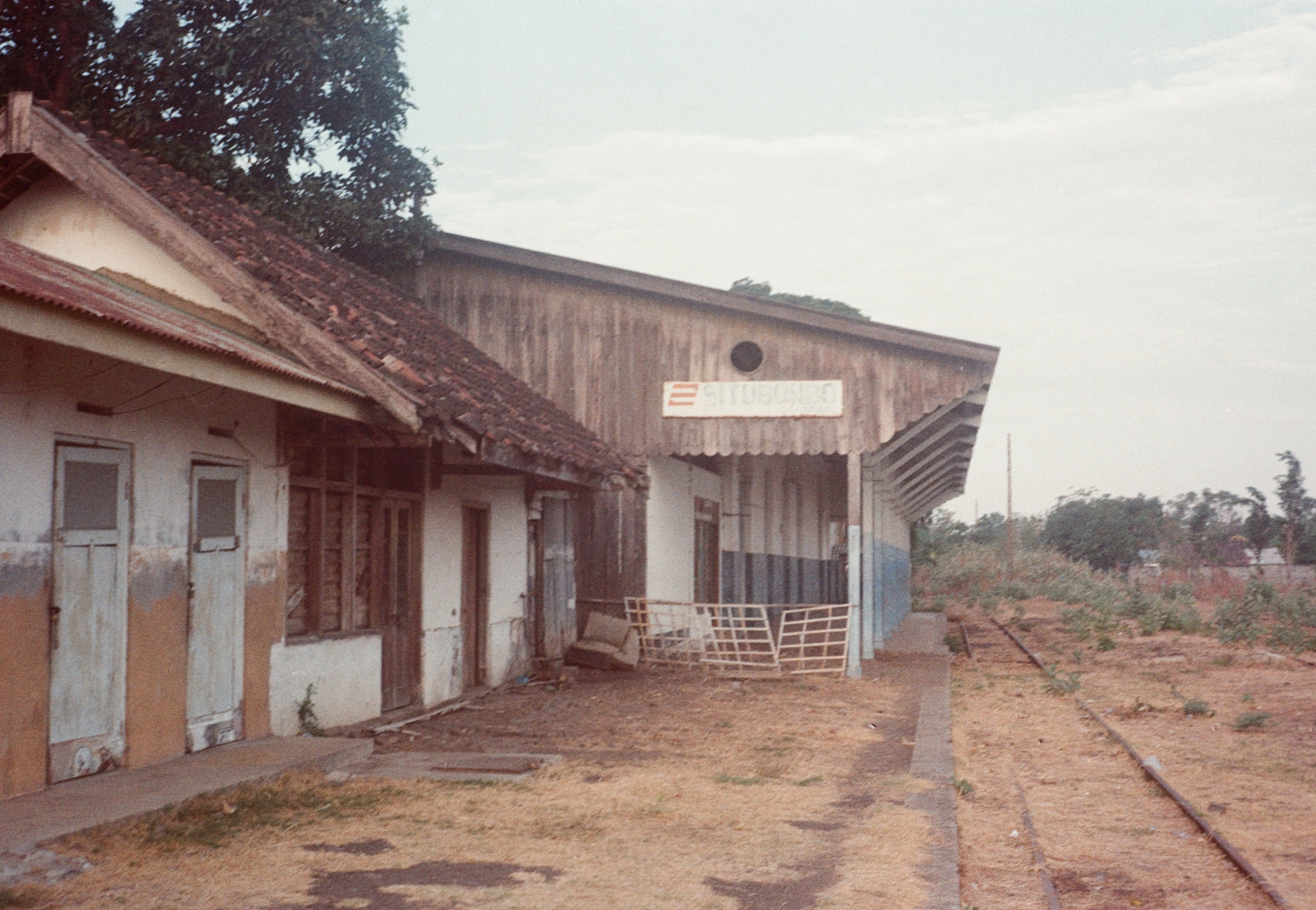
Situbondo Station in 2017

The station began operation simultaneously with the completion of the Kalisat–Panarukan railway on 1 October 1897 by the Staatsspoorwegen. This line formed the final segment of the major Probolinggo–Panarukan railway project, whose concession had been issued on 23 June 1893.

The station was originally named Soemberkolak, derived from the name of the village in which the station is located. From Soemberkolak there was a branch line leading to “Sitoebondo”, located about 1.6 km east of Soemberkolak. This branch line was inaugurated on 1 October 1897 at the same time as the opening of the Kalisat–Panarukan railway.

When the Panji Sugar Factory was in operation, a continuation of the railway line was constructed to connect directly to the factory. Before the Indonesian independence era, the names Soemberkolak and Sitoebondo were changed, although the exact date of the official renaming is unclear. The railway stop originally known as Soemberkolak was renamed Sitoebondo, while the former Sitoebondo stop was renamed Sitoebondo Goederenstation (later known as Situbondo Gudang Station).

In the 1950s, the names of both stations were adjusted by the Djawatan Kereta Api (DKA) to conform with the Republican Spelling System. The extension line from Situbondo Gudang toward Panji was opened on 1 May 1912. However, this branch line was deactivated in 1965. The line had previously been used to transport sugarcane from the Panji Sugar Factory.

During the Indonesian National Revolution, the station also became a silent witness to the struggle for independence. It is recorded that a cleric from Situbondo, As'ad Syamsul Arifin, together with a group of fighters, departed by train from this station to Gedangan Station in Sidoarjo after Surabaya had fallen under British control during the Battle of Surabaya. When roughly one hundred fighters under his leadership arrived at Gedangan Station, they stayed in the homes of local residents because they had no established headquarters.

Prior to its closure, the station was served only by the Jember–Panarukan local train service. The trains were frequently hauled by German-built Henschel diesel-hydraulic locomotives (the BB303 and BB306 classes) and typically consisted of three non-air-conditioned economy-class passenger coaches. This passenger service functioned as a feeder line, transporting passengers from the more remote areas of Situbondo to Jember Station.

The station was fully closed in 2004 by PT KAI, along with the line and all services operating on it, due to aging infrastructure and competition from private cars and public road transport.

At present, the station building remains intact and is occupied by a resident, while the former station yard has largely turned into grassland. However, several pieces of railway equipment still remain around the site, including a rescue wagon, a mechanical railway signal of the Alkmaar and Tebeng types along with its operating handle, and several pendulum-type switch levers.

The station, along with all other stations on the Kalisat–Panarukan railway segment, has been included among the priority lines for reactivation under Presidential Regulation No. 80 of 2019, a program planned to be implemented by the Directorate General of Railways.

== Buildings and Layouts ==
When this station was operational, it had four railway tracks, with Track 1 serving as the main through line. The station also had a warehouse and two storage sidings.

== Gallery ==
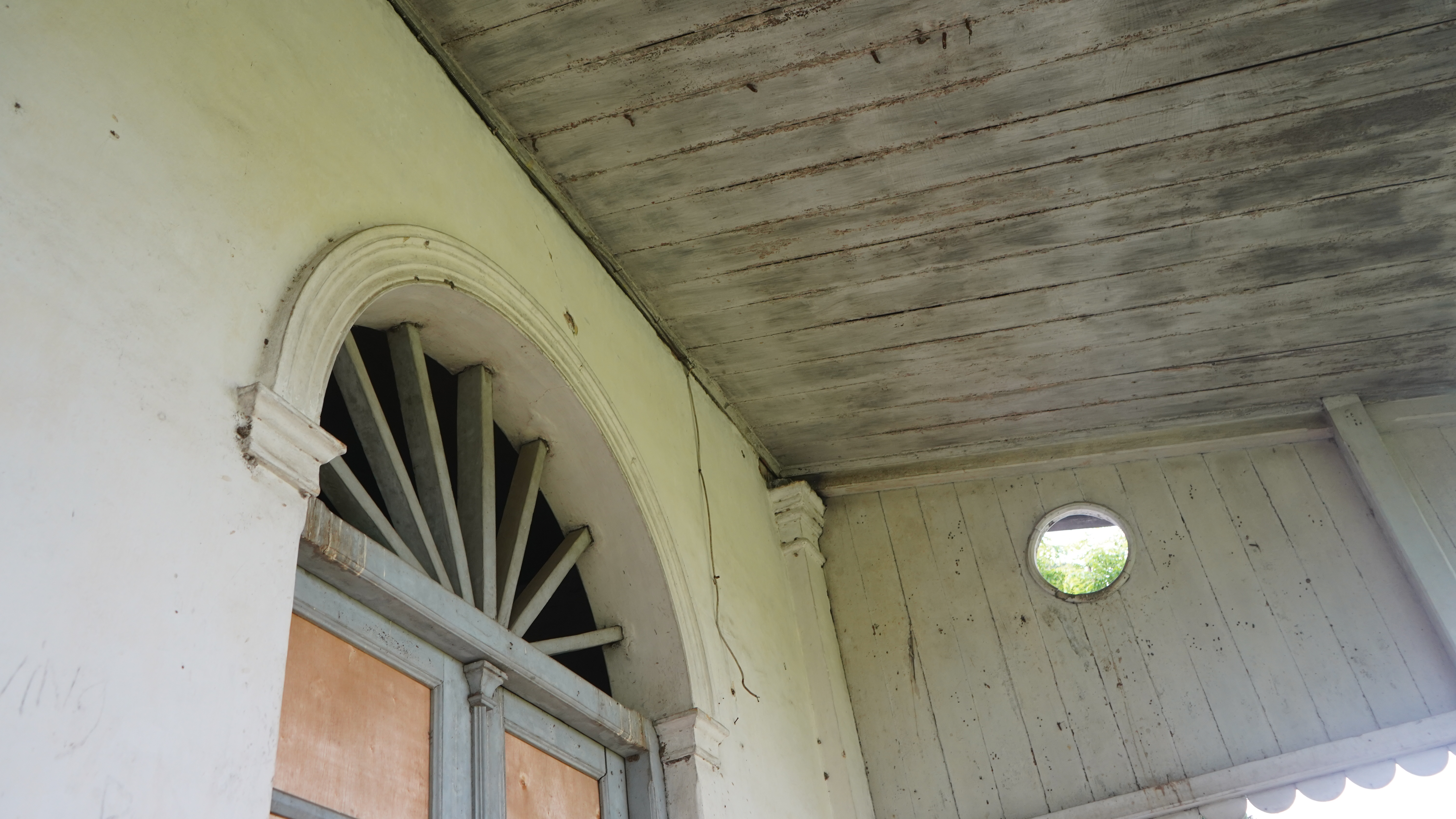
The ceiling of Situbondo Station photographed during a survey conducted by the Directorate General of Railways together with the Indonesian Railway Preservation Society (IRPS) in 2024

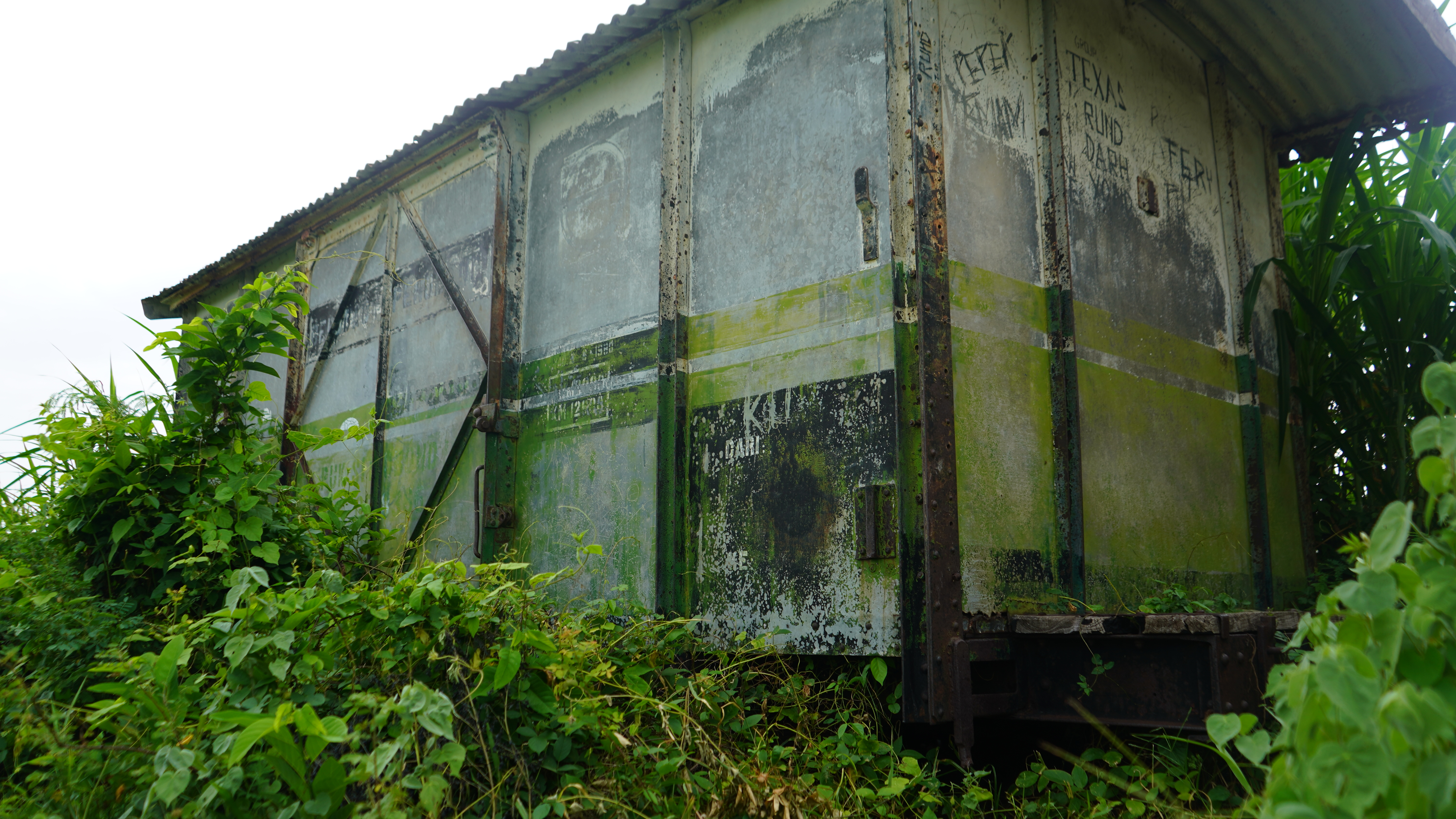
An NR wagon left at Situbondo Station, photographed during a survey conducted by the Directorate General of Railways together with the Indonesian Railway Preservation Society (IRPS) in 2024

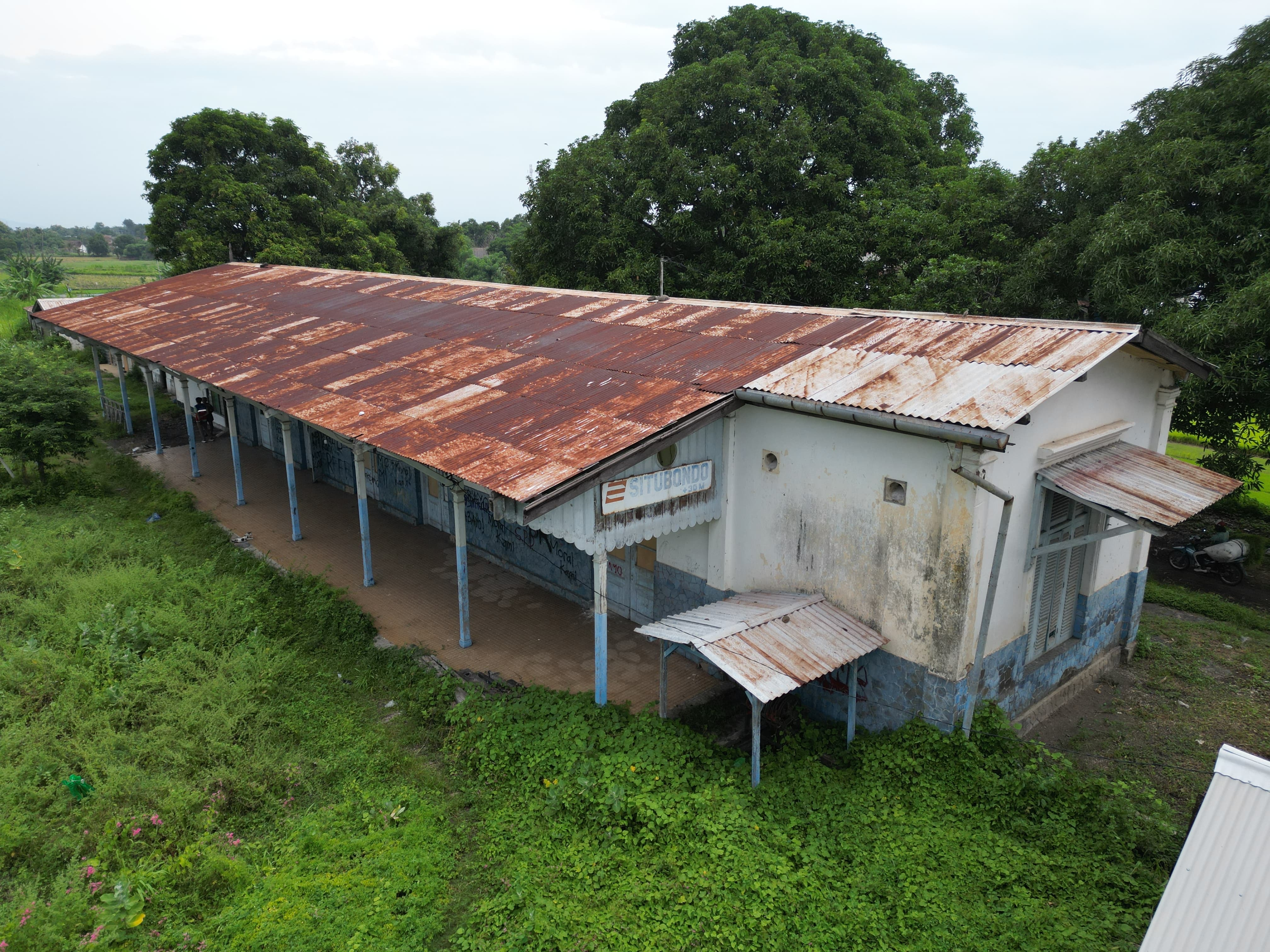
Situbondo Station photographed from the air during a survey conducted by the Directorate General of Railways together with the Indonesian Railway Preservation Society (IRPS) in 2024

Preceding station	Kereta Api Indonesia	Following station
Kalibagor towards Kalisat	Kalisat–Panarukan line	Tribungan towards Panarukan Pelabuhan
Situbondo	Branch line to Panji	Situbondo Gudang towards Panji
