= Randegan railway station =

Railway station in Indonesia

Randegan Station Stasiun Randegan
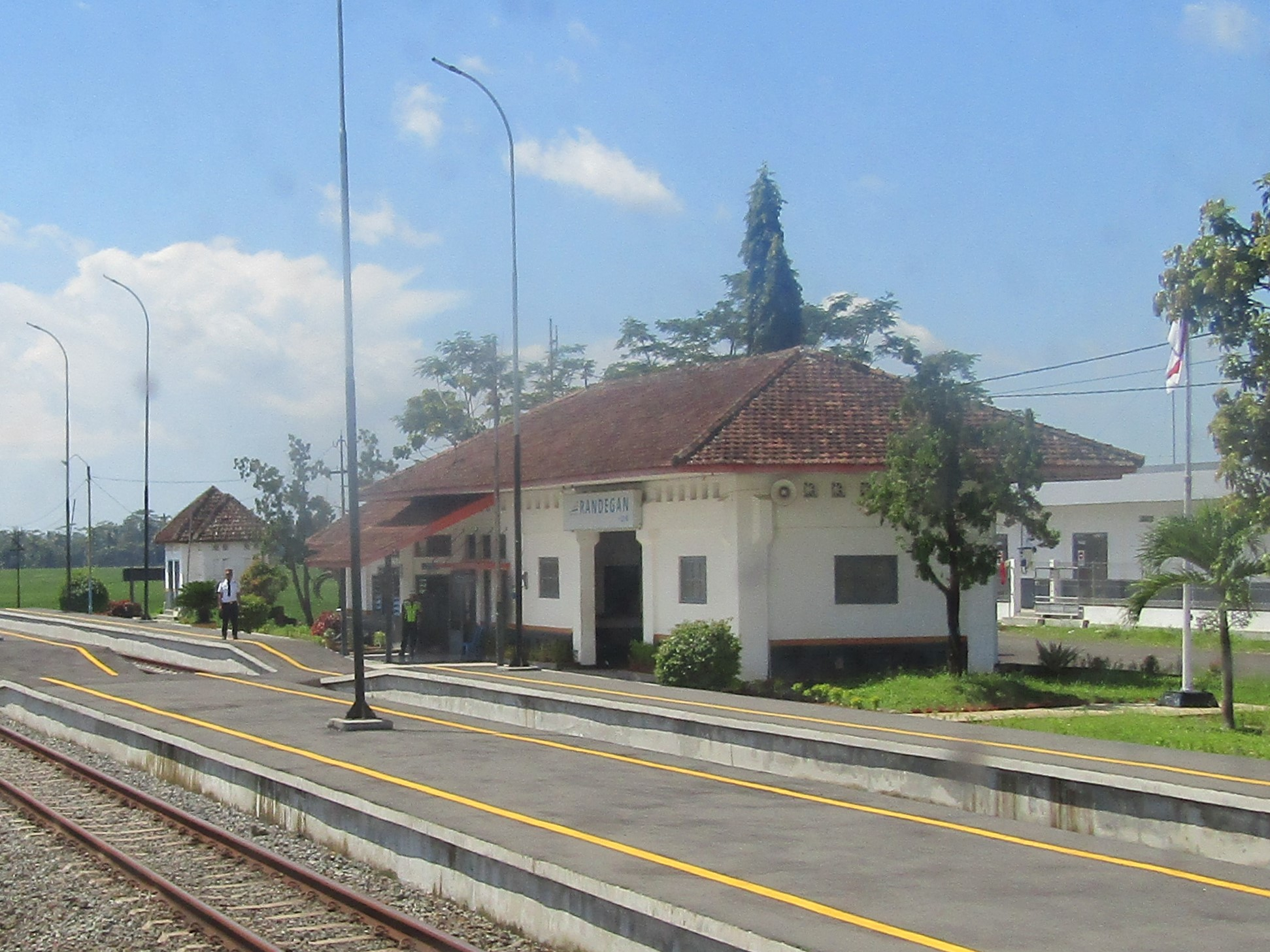
- The original building with new built raised platform, as of 2019

General information
- Location: Karangasem, Sampang, Cilacap Regency; Central Java; Indonesia
- Coordinates: 7.569901°S 109.2199°E
- Elevation: +11 m (36 ft)
- Owner: Kereta Api Indonesia
- Operator: Kereta Api Indonesia
- Line: Prupuk–Kroya
- Platforms: 1 side platform 2 Island platforms
- Tracks: 4

Construction
- Structure type: Ground
- Parking: Available
- Accessible: Available

Other information
- Station code: RDN
- Classification: Class III

History
- Opened: 1 July 1916
Location
- Location within Java

Randegan Station (RDN) is a small railway station located in Karangasem, Sampang, Cilacap Regency, Central Java, Indonesia.

The station sits at an elevation of +11 m (36 ft) amsl. The station is under the subdivision DAOP V Purwokerto of PT Kereta Api Indonesia (Persero). The station is not far from Indonesian National Route 3 which leads to Bandung and Yogyakarta.

== History ==
The station was built in 1915 by the Dutch East Indies Railway Bureau (Staatsspoorwegen West Lijnen, SS-WL).

The station initially had 2 tracks with second being a passing track, but with the opening of the Double track Prupuk–Kroya railway on 28 January 2019, the station now has 2 Passing track and 2 side tracks. Track 2 is for trains heading to Kroya, while Track 3 is for trains heading to Purwokerto. The original building is still standing and maintained to this day.

== Services ==
As of 2020, there are no trains that stop in Randegan Station.

Preceding station	Kereta Api Indonesia	Following station
Kebasen towards Prupuk	Prupuk–Kroya	Kroya; Terminus
