= Cummings Jewish Centre for Seniors =

Cummings Jewish Centre for Seniors (CJCS)
- Founded: Montreal, Quebec, Canada (2000)
- Website: cummingscentre.org

The Cummings Jewish Centre for Seniors (CJCS) is a constituent agency of Federation CJA in Montreal, Quebec, Canada. It offers a fully integrated service system that assists Jewish seniors in Montreal, promoting positive attitudes towards aging, encouraging independent living, and enhancing the quality of life.

CJCS offers a wide range of services and programs to approximately 7,500 Jewish seniors aged 50 or more with varying degrees of mobility and interests. Clients can access a range of services from homecare to subsidies for transportation and medication, culturally sensitive recreational events, and a variety of educational programs.

Over 3,800 seniors are members at CJCS, and 1,200 volunteers are active in assisting the day-to-day operations of the agency. The Support Services department continues to take over 2,500 intakes a year and refers seniors to additional resources in the community, where appropriate. The agency plays an active role in government advocacy for the rights of the senior population, and is touted across North America for its leadership in services to Holocaust survivors.

CJCS participates many research projects, and generate their own grant-funded research activities, often in partnership with local universities and organizations within the health and social services sector. Areas of research interest are varied, and have included:

- nutrition and homebound seniors
- medication mismanagement
- adapted exercise programs for seniors who have had a stroke
- advocacy and volunteers
- Holocaust Survivors

CJCS runs a Wellness Centre, and has its own Workout Studio, to meet members' fitness needs and goals, including total body conditioning and exercise regimes featuring cardiovascular conditioning. The Centre also runs Adapted Exercise Clinics, as a means of providing classes to those who have had a stroke, suffer from Parkinsons disease or multiple sclerosis.

CJCS runs programs in conjunction with various organizations around the Island of Montreal, such as the Westmount Mini Centre, which provides courses at Temple Emanu-El-Beth Sholom (Westmount, Quebec), recreational, social, educational and cultural programs, in association with Congregation Beth Tikvah, in Dollard-des-Ormeaux, the Beth Ora Seniors Mini Centre, in conjunction with Congregation Beth Ora, in Ville Saint-Laurent, and Prime Time, programs run for residents in Montreal's West Island.

== History ==
In [1949], the National Council of Jewish Women (NCJW) conducted survey and confirmed the need for a senior citizens' club in the Montreal Jewish Community.

In [1964], the name Golden Age Association (GAA) was adopted. The agency operated as a constituent agency of Allied Jewish Community Services (AJCS), now known as Federation CJA.

In [1965], Golden Age Association (GAA) opened its doors, in a rented duplex on Cote St. Catherine Road and Victoria Avenue.

In 1978, a donation from the Cummings family enabled the construction of a new home on Westbury Avenue.

In [1984], CJCS created the Community Development Department to establish Mini- Centres in communities such as Côte Saint-Luc, Chomedey, Ville Saint-Laurent and Dollard-des-Ormeaux.

In [1988], Jewish Support Services for the Elderly (JSSE), a constituent agency of Federation CJA, began providing services to frail seniors and their families.

In [1989], the Centre for Creative Lifestyles opened its doors to encourage the 50+ community of Montreal to become involved in programs and seminars designed to enhance their lifestyles.

In [1994], the Maurice Gross Family Foundation funded expansion of the Wellness Centre programs, launched in [1992] to promote the role of fitness for a healthy lifestyle.

In [1995], the Westmount Mini-Centre was launched at Temple Emanu-El-Beth Sholom (Westmount, Quebec).

In [2000], JSSE and GAA merged, and became the Cummings Jewish Centre for Seniors (CJCS). And, CJCS was awarded the Hommage bénévolat Québec prize by Quebec the provincial government to honor volunteer involvement.

In [2002], CJCS established a Survivor's Assistance Office, the first of its kind in Canada, providing Holocaust survivors and their families with information and access to compensation and restitution programs.

In 2004, CJCS established a Foundation to oversee all aspects of fundraising for the Centre.
