= Ketapang railway station (Banyuwangi) =

Railway station in Indonesia

Ketapang Station Stasiun Ketapang
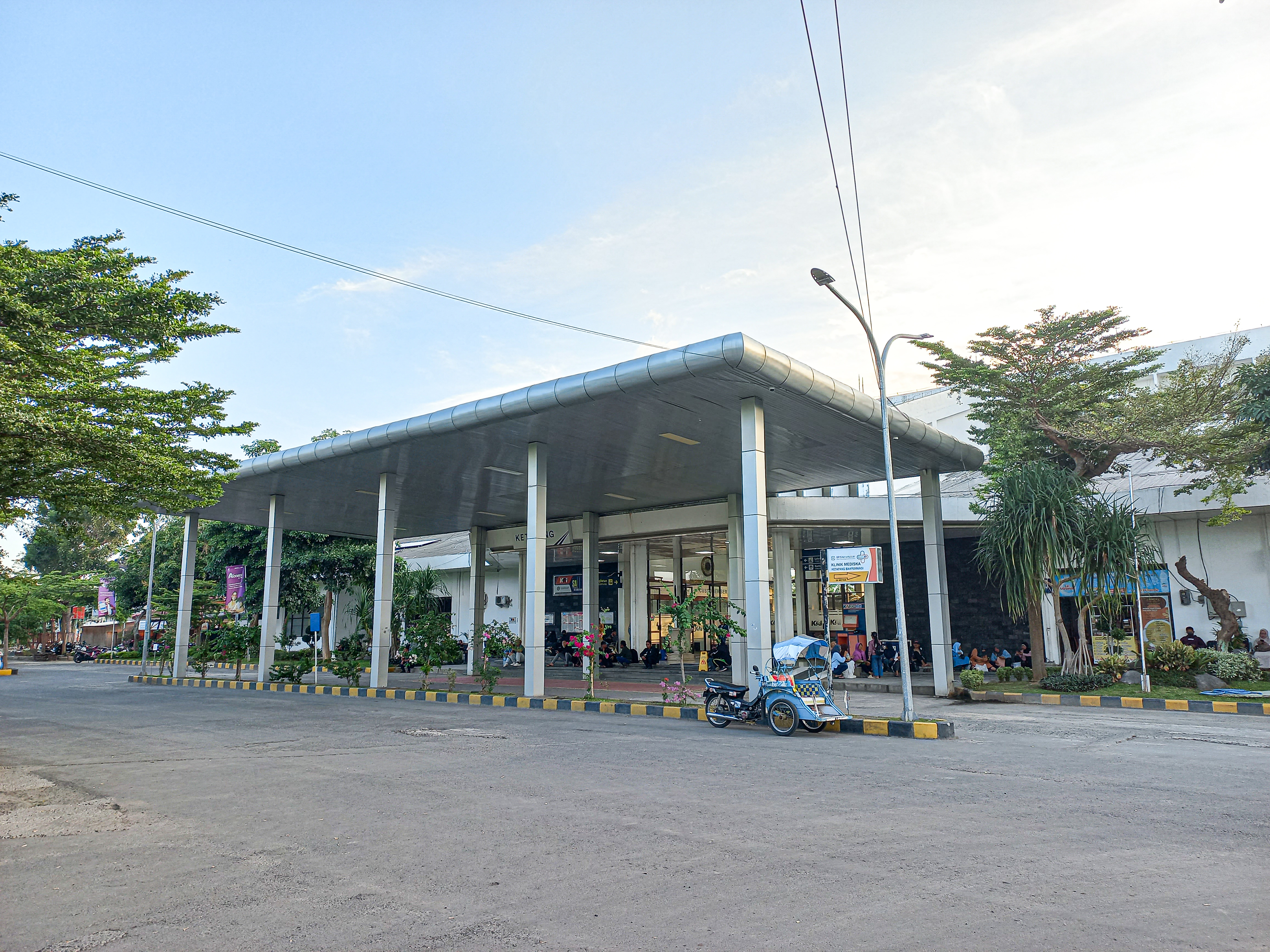
- Front view of the Station 2025

General information
- Location: Ketapang, Kalipuro, Banyuwangi Regency; East Java; Indonesia
- Coordinates: 8°8′28″S 114°23′50″E
- Elevation: +7 m (23 ft)
- Operator: Kereta Api Indonesia
- Line: Kalisat–Banyuwangi
- Platforms: 1 side platform 2 island platforms
- Tracks: 6

Construction
- Structure type: Ground
- Parking: Available
- Cycle facilities: Bicycle parking
- Accessible: Available

Other information
- Station code: KTG • 5534
- Classification: Large type C

History
- Opened: 7 September 1985; 40 years ago (Note: The inscription at Karangasem Station with the numbers dated 7 September 1985 is evidence of the inauguration of the new Kabat–Banyuwangi Baru (Ketapang) railway line)
- Former names: Banyuwangi Baru Station (1985-2019)
Location
- Location within Banyuwangi Regency

Ketapang Station (formerly Banyuwangi Baru Station) is a railway station, managed by Kereta Api Indonesia, located at Ketapang, Kalipuro, Banyuwangi Regency, East Java. This station is at the most southeastern railway station in Southeast Asia.

As of 1 December 2019, the station changed its name to "Ketapang Station", based on the proposal of the Banyuwangi Regency Government to Kereta Api Indonesia so that it can make it easier for tourists visiting Banyuwangi.

== History ==
The background to the opening of the new port in Ketapang was the silting of the port city of Banyuwangi (now Boom Beach) which made it difficult for freight ships to lean on the pier. On 1 January 1974, this port activity was stopped and moved to a new port in Meneng (now Tanjungwangi).

Because the need for crossings is increasing, it is necessary to create integration and continuity between modes of transportation. This station was built simultaneously with the construction of a new line from Kabat Station to Ketapang Harbor in 1984–1985 to replace the Banyuwangi Lama Station which had been established in the city of Banyuwangi. On 7 September 1985, the new line was officially opened along with the operation of this station and two other stations located on the line (Karangasem—now Banyuwangi Kota—and Argopuro).

== Building and layout ==
Ketapang Station has six train lines with track 2 being a straight track. To the north of this station there is a locomotive sub-depot and a train depot to store and maintain the train fleet, especially trains operated by Kereta Api Indonesia's Operational Area IX.

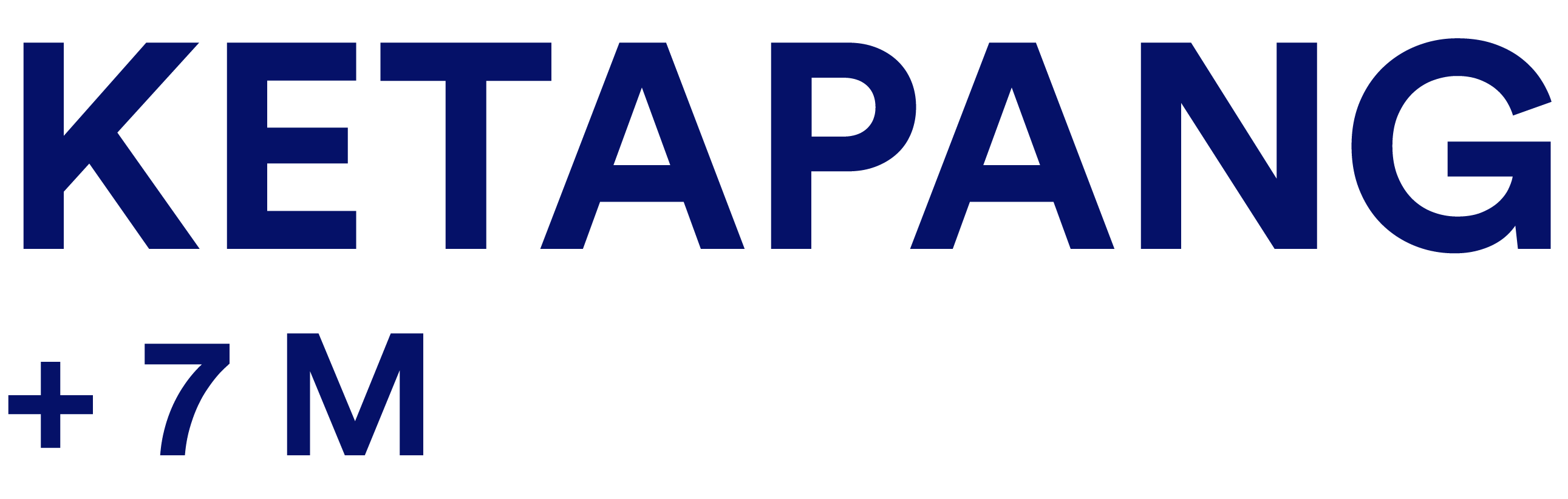

Line 6
Train series parking lane

Has a direct access from and towards rail wye

Line 5
Train series parking lane
Line 4
Train series parking lane
Line 3
← The second turning track for train departure and arrival line
Island platform
Line 2
← Straight track and also as the main line for train departure and arrival
Island platform
Line 1
← The main turning track for train departure and arrival line

Has a direct access from and towards locomotive depot or train depot

Side platform
G
Main building

== Services ==
The railway services that use this station :

=== Executive and Economy class ===
- Mutiara Timur to Surabaya Pasar Turi
- Wijayakusuma to Cilacap
- Blambangan Express to Pasar Senen
- Ijen Express to Malang
- Sangkuriang to Bandung

=== Economy class ===
- Sri Tanjung to Lempuyangan
- Probowangi to Surabaya Gubeng
- Tawang Alun to Malang
- Logawa to Purwokerto

=== Local train ===
- Pandanwangi to Jember

== Gallery ==
=== As Banyuwangi Baru Station ===
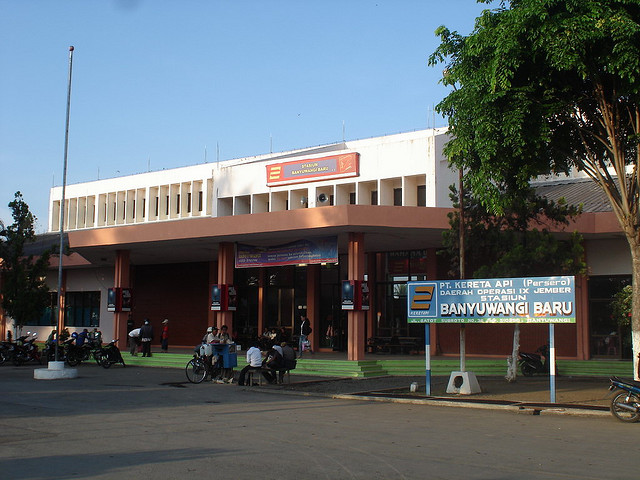
The front view of the station (prior to renaming)

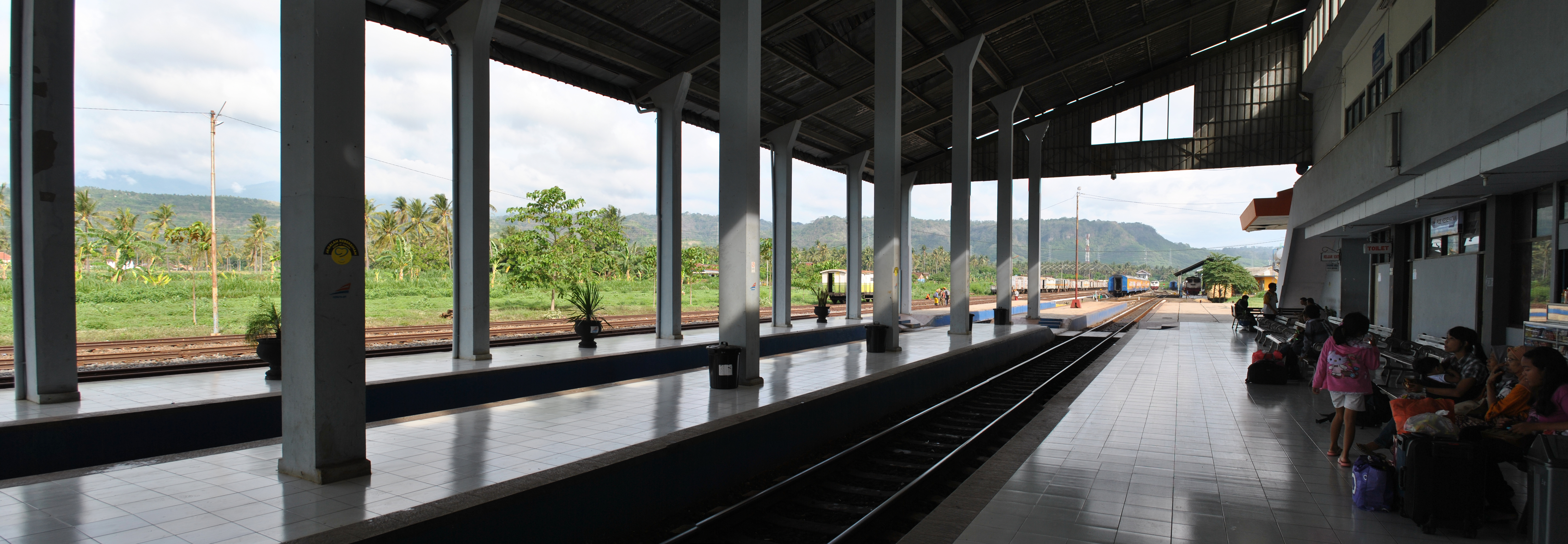
The platform of the station

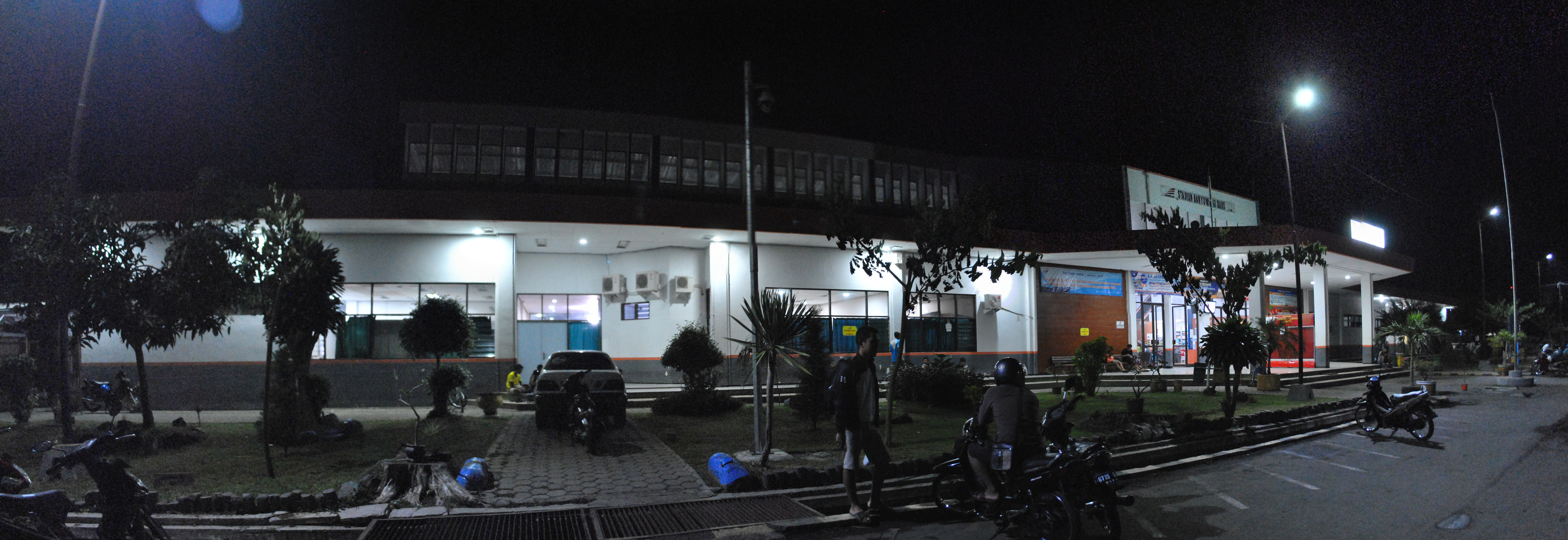
The front view of the station at night

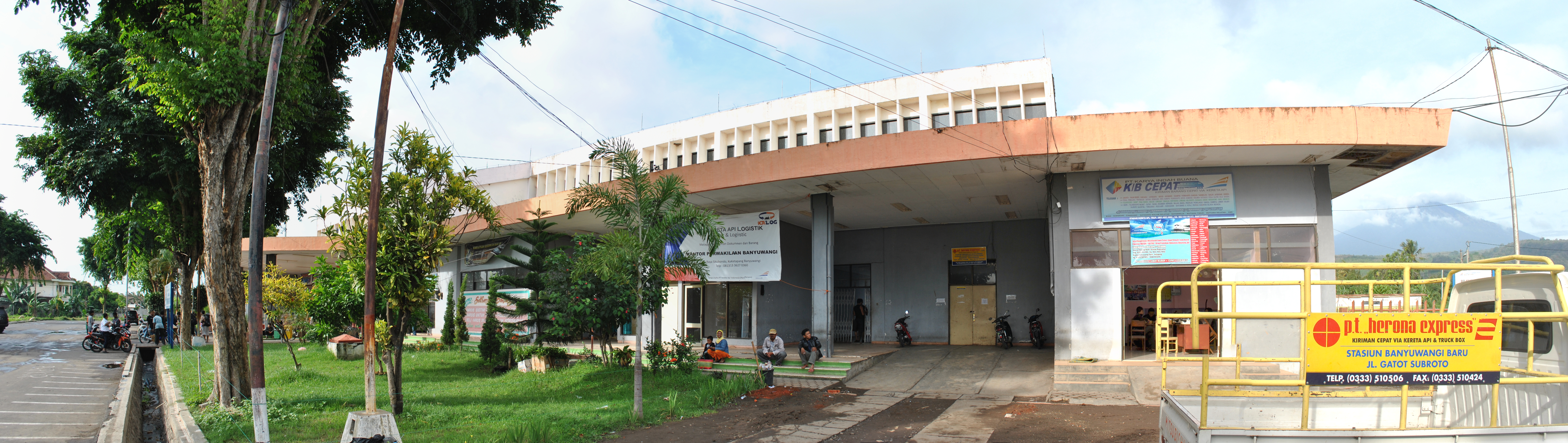
The logistic warehouse of the station

=== As Ketapang Station ===
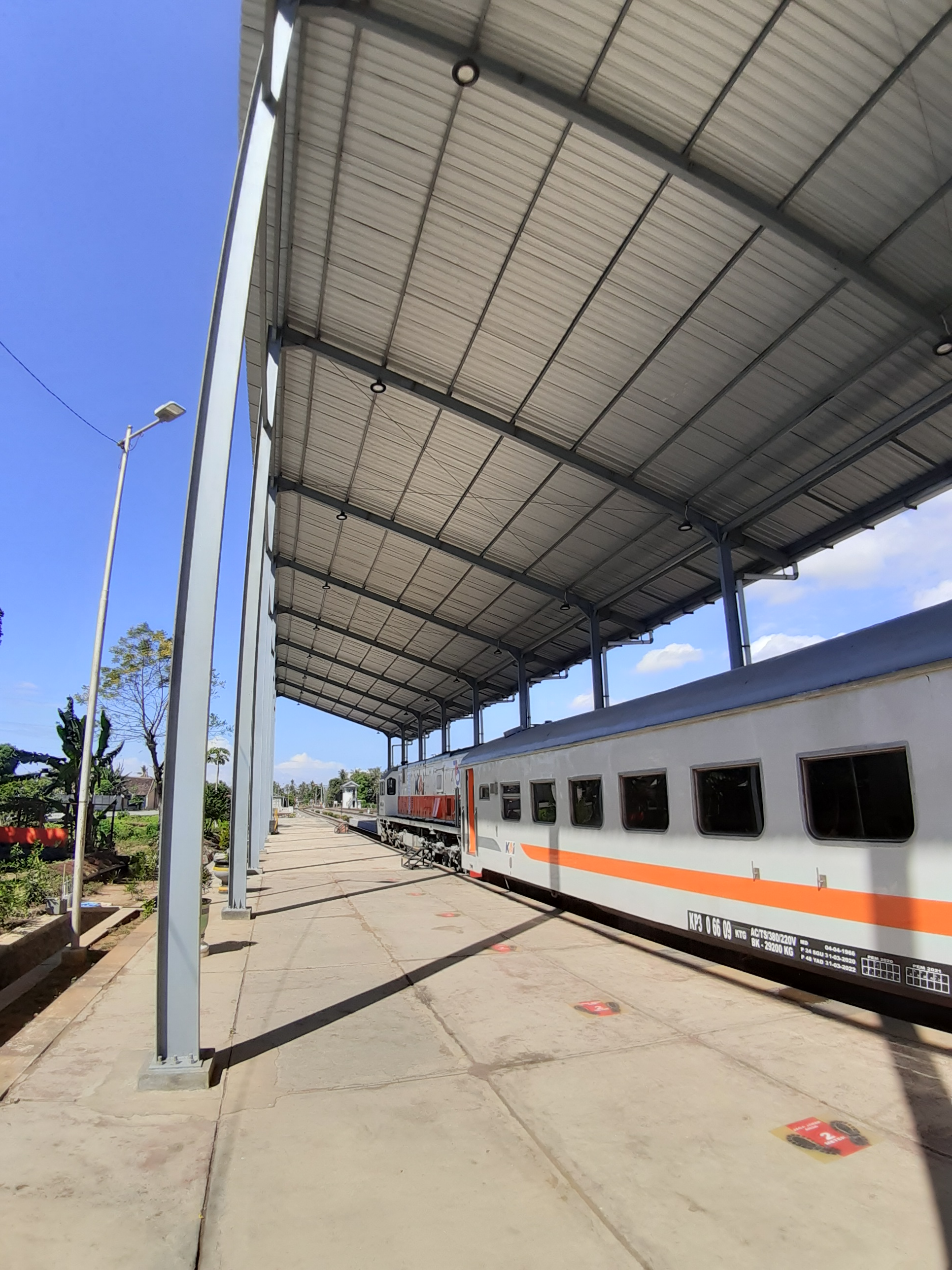
The extension of the canopy at line 1 platform

== Notes ==
Preceding station	Kereta Api Indonesia	Following station
Argopuro towards Kalisat	Kalisat–Banyuwangi	Terminus
