= CBB Bank =

Korean American bank

- Company type: Private company
- Traded as: OTCQX: CBBI
- Industry: Banking
- Founded: 2005; 21 years ago
- Headquarters: Los Angeles, California, United States
- Key people: James Hong, president and chief executive officer
- Revenue: $51.2 million (2016)
- Number of employees: 170 (2023)
- Parent: CBB Bancorp, Inc.
- Website: cbb-bank.com

CBB Bank is an American bank that operates in the states of California, Texas and Hawaii providing commercial and personal banking services to the Korean-American community. It owned by the holding company CBB Bancorp, Inc.

As of 2015, CBB Bank had 11 retail branches in California, Texas and Hawaii. It is one of five major Korean-American banks in the United States.

== History ==
Commonwealth Business Bank, as well known as CBB Bank, was founded on March 9, 2005, in Los Angeles, California with only 20 employees and $23.1 million of capital. It had its first stock traded on March 21 of that same year. It got TARP CPP Redemption on July 22, 2013, and had total assets of over $1 billion as of July 31, 2017. On September 1, 2017, it formed CBB Bancorp.

In February 2021 CBB Bancorp announced it was acquiring Honolulu-based Ohana Pacific bank and its two retail locations. The sale was completed in July of that year.

== Services ==
The bank offers retail banking services such as checking, installment, savings, money market, and certification of deposit accounts, as well as IRAs; business line of credit, term loans, trade finance, professional loans, business property loans, commercial real estate loans, and construction loans; SBA loans; and debit and credit cards. The company also provides treasury management, mobile and online banking, wire transfer, telephone banking, safe deposit box, and lockbox services.
