= Cibeber railway station =

Railway station in Indonesia

Cibeber Station Stasiun Cibeber
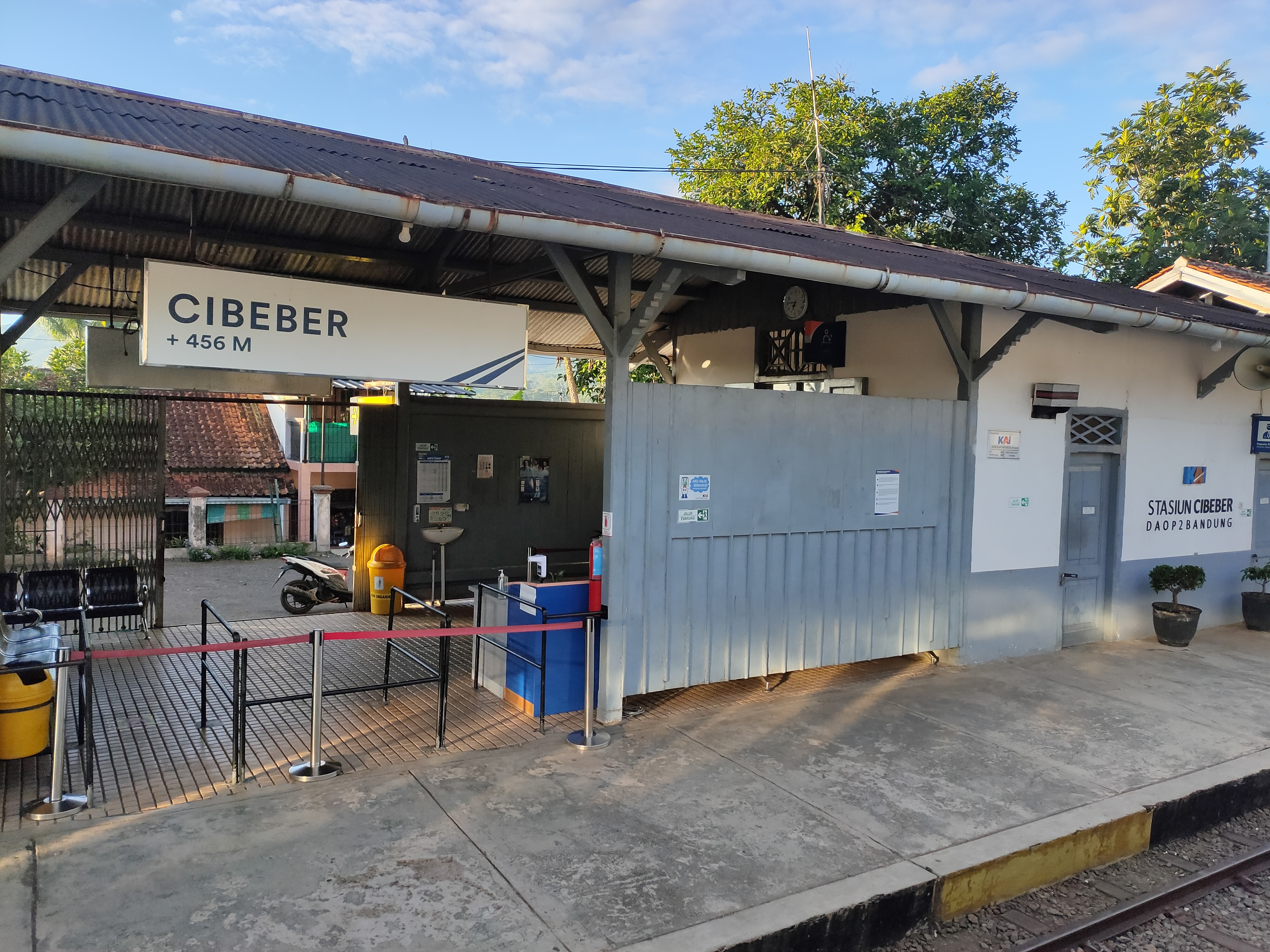
- Cibeber Station platform in 2022

General information
- Location: Cipetir, Cibeber, Cianjur Regency; West Java; Indonesia
- Coordinates: 6.937603999999999°S 107.12129999999999°E
- Elevation: +456 m (1,496 ft)
- Owner: Kereta Api Indonesia
- Operator: Kereta Api Indonesia
- Line: Manggarai–Padalarang
- Platforms: 1 island platform 1 side platform
- Tracks: 2

Construction
- Structure type: Ground
- Parking: Available
- Accessible: Available

Other information
- Station code: CBB
- Classification: Class III

History
- Opened: 10 May 1883
Location
- Location within Java

Cibeber Station (CBB) is a class III railway station located in Cipetir, Cibeber, Cianjur Regency. The station, which is located at an altitude of +456 m, is included in the Operational Area II Bandung.

== Services ==
The following is a list of train services at the Cibeber Station.

=== Passenger services ===
- Economy class
  - Siliwangi, towards Cipatat and towards Sukabumi

| Preceding station | Kereta Api Indonesia | Following station |
|---|---|---|
| Sindangresmi towards Manggarai | Manggarai–Padalarang | Cilaku towards Padalarang |
