= Glenmore, Banyuwangi =

Glenmore
- Town
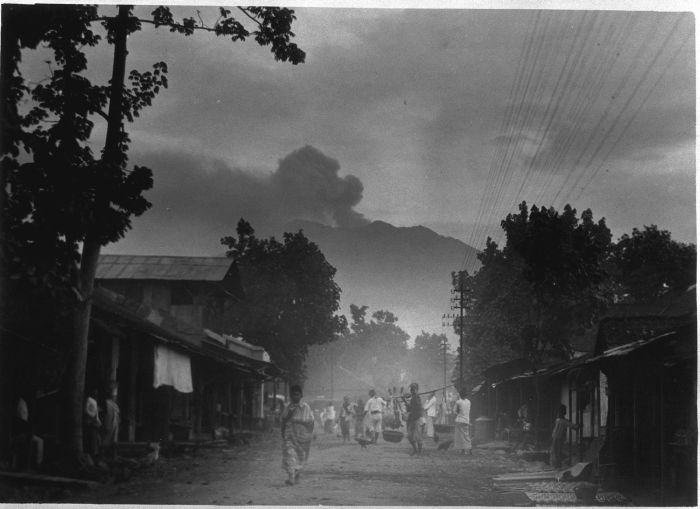
- Glenmore in 1927. In the background is Raung in activity.

- Location in Banyuwangi Regency, Java and Indonesia Glenmore (Java) Glenmore (Indonesia)
- Coordinates: 8°18′S 114°3′E
- Country: Indonesia
- Region: Java
- Province: East Java
- Regency: Banyuwangi Regency
- Time zone: UTC+7 (IWST)
- Area code: (+62) 333
- Villages: 7
- Website: glenmore.banyuwangikab.go.id

Glenmore is a district (kecamatan) of Banyuwangi Regency, East Java province, Indonesia. It is named after a plantation located nearby which once owned by an Englishman named Ros Taylor since 1910.

Glenmore is a Scottish name. The name may lend support to the report of the existence of Scottish settlement since 18th century in the area, established by Catholic Scots originally seeking refuge in Holland, but later sent to Dutch East Indies.

The Pura Pucak Raung, a Javanese Hindu temple, is located in Glenmore. It is within the vicinity of the temple that Balinese literature locates the place where the Hindu saint Maharishi Markandeya gathered followers for an expedition to Bali, whereby he is said to have brought Hinduism to the island in the fifth century AD.

== Villages ==
Glenmore has 7 villages:

- Bumiharjo
- Karangharjo
- Margomulyo
- Sepanjang
- Sumbergondo
- Tegalharjo
- Tulungrejo
