= Camp B'nai Brith (Montreal) =

- מחנה בני ברית

Location
- 5445 Route 329 North; Lantier, Quebec, J8C 0M7; 46.123175°N 74.281573°W

Information
- Type: Jewish summer camp
- Established: 1921; 105 years ago
- Gender: co-ed
- Age range: 6–17
- Affiliation: QCA, AIJC
- Website: cbbmtl.org

Camp B'nai Brith (Hebrew: מַחֲנֶה בְּנֵי בְּרִית) is a Jewish summer camp north of Montreal, in Sainte-Agathe-des-Monts. Camp B'nai Brith has been recognized as a pioneer in the world of community-service camps in North America. CBB offers camping to children and senior citizens on a sliding fee scale based on the family's finances, with fundraising activities subsidizing those who cannot afford to pay.

== History ==
In 1920, the Mount Royal Lodge of B'nai Brith Canada set out on a project to provide summer holidays for underprivileged Jewish boys. The first campsite was located on a farm about 64 kilometres (40 mi) from Montreal, and only those children whose parents could not afford to pay for camping services were accepted. The counsellors and directors were student volunteers from McGill University, and repurposed army tents were used as sleeping quarters. The camp emphasized Jewish culture and Zionism in its activities.

Camp B'nai Brith moved to its current location in 1929. All capital and operating costs were financed by Mount Royal Lodge until 1942, when Camp B'nai Brith became a constituent agency of the Combined Jewish Appeal. From 1954 to 1964, the camp grew to accommodate over 1000 campers, most of whom received scholarships to attend. In the late 1970s, a seniors' vacation retreat was created at the camp in conjunction with the Cummings Golden Age Centre.

CBB now runs a variety of different programs over the course of the summer and runs two main camper sessions of about 525 campers each.

== Notable alumni ==
- Saul Bellow, writer
- William Shatner, actor
- Harley Morenstein, Internet personality
- Saul Rubinek, actor
- Robby Hoffman, comedian / writer

== See also ==
- Camp B'nai Brith of Ottawa
