= Communität Christusbruderschaft Selbitz =

The Communität Christusbruderschaft Selbitz (CCB) (Community of the Christ-Brotherhood Selbitz) is a mixed Religious Order in the Evangelical Lutheran Church in Bavaria in Germany.

The Community was founded in 1948 by pastor Walter Hümmer (1909-1972) and his wife Hanna Hümmer (1910 - 1977) in Schwarzenbach an der Saale.

The Community lives according to the evangelical counsels of poverty, chastity, and obedience. The Order is led by prioress and prior. The Community has today 120 Sisters, 4 Brothers, and 78 tertiaries. The mother-house of the order is in Selbitz.
