= Camp B'nai Brith (Ottawa) =

Camp B'nai Brith of Ottawa
- מחנה בני ברית

Location
- 7861 Chemin River; Quyon, Quebec, J0X 2V0; 45.524746°N 76.186153°W

Information
- Former name: Ottawa Jewish Boy Scouts Camp
- Type: Jewish summer camp
- Established: 1935; 91 years ago
- Director: Cindy Benedek
- Gender: Co-educational
- Age range: 7–16
- Affiliation: OCA
- Website: cbbottawa.com

Camp B'nai Brith of Ottawa (Hebrew: מַחֲנֶה בְּנֵי בְּרִית), also known as CBB of Ottawa, is a Jewish summer camp north-west of Ottawa, near Quyon, Quebec. The camp draws campers and staff from across Canada, the United States, Europe and Israel.

== History ==
Lodge no. 885 of B'nai Brith Canada founded the Ottawa Jewish Boy Scouts Camp in 1935, sponsoring forty underprivileged local Jewish boy scouts who wished to attend summer camp. The camp, which would become Camp B'nai Brith of Ottawa, was originally located in Dubrobin near Fitzroy Harbour, serving the Jewish communities of Ottawa, Toronto, and Montreal. While sponsored by the Lodge, the camp was initially run under the strict supervision of the District Boy Scouts Association.

Beginning in 1938, Camp B'nai Brith set aside two weeks for a girls camp at the conclusion of the boys' four week camp. The camp moved its current site on the shore of the Ottawa River in Quyon, Quebec in 1946.

== Notable alumni ==
- Leonard Cohen, poet and singer-songwriter
- Noah Cantor, football player
- Boris Cherniak, hypnotist
- Steven Dubinsky, hockey player
- Saul Rubinek, actor and director

== See also ==
- Camp B'nai Brith of Montreal
