= CB =

CB and variants may refer to:

== Places ==
- CB postcode area or Cambridge postcode area, England
- Cambodia (LOC MARC code, obsolete FIPS Pub 10-4 country code and obsolete NATO digram CB)
- Centura București, a ring road of Bucharest, Romania
- Colegio Bolivar, an American school in Cali, Colombia
- Province of Campobasso, Italy

== People ==
- Chris Brown (born 1989), American R&B singer
- Henry Campbell-Bannerman (1836–1908), British prime minister 1906–1908, known as CB

== Brands and enterprises ==
- Carte Bancaire, a bank card brand
- Chaturbate, a pornographic webcam website
- Christianssands Bryggeri, a Norwegian brewery
- ScotAirways (IATA airline code CB)

== Science and technology ==
=== Computing and telecommunications ===
- Cell Broadcast, in GSM mobile networks
- Citizens band radio (CB radio), short-distance radio

=== Other uses in science and technology ===
- Columbium (Cb), an obsolete name for the element niobium
- Cumulonimbus cloud (Cb), a type of cloud

== Sea vessels ==
- CB-class midget submarine, WWII, Italy
- Block coefficient (C_{b}), a parameter describing the shape of a ship's hull
- A retired US Navy hull classification symbol: Large cruiser (CB)

== Sports ==
=== Positions ===
- Cornerback, a position in American football
- Centre-back, a defender position in Association football

== Titles ==
- Companion of the Order of the Bath, British honour

== Other uses ==
- CB, dominical letter for a leap year starting on Friday
- Construction Battalion (CB or "Seabee"), a US Navy engineering unit

== See also ==
- C♭ (musical note)
  - C♭ major
  - C-flat minor
