= Jennifer Dickson =

South African-born British-Canadian artist (1936–2025)

Jennifer Dickson CM RA RE
- Born: 17 September 1936; Piet Retief, South Africa
- Died: 18 January 2025 (aged 88); Ottawa, Ontario, Canada
- Occupations: Artist; Printmaker
- Awards: Victor Tolgesy Arts Award (2002)

Jennifer Dickson CM RA RE (17 September 1936 – 18 January 2025) was a South African-born British-Canadian photographer. She studied at Goldsmiths College in England and Atelier 17 in France.

== Early life ==
Dickson was born in Piet Retief in Mpumalanga province in South Africa on 17 September 1936. From 1954 to 1959, she studied painting and printmaking at the Goldsmiths College School of Art at the University of London in England. From 1960 to 1965, she was the apprentice of Stanley William Hayter at Atelier 17 in Paris, France. During this time, in 1962, she held her first solo exhibition in London. In 1965, she was made a member of the Royal Society of Painters, Etchers and Engravers.

After her apprenticeship, she began teaching at the Brighton College of Art in Brighton, England. She put in place a graduate program in printmaking at this college, including photography.

In 1968, she moved to Jamaica to become a visiting fellow in fine and applied arts at the University of the West Indies.

== Career in Canada ==
In 1969, Dickson emigrated to Canada where she became the director of the graphics program at the Saidye Bronfman Centre in Montreal, Quebec. Dickson was elected as a Royal Academician in 1976. She lived in Ottawa, Ontario, Canada, and was a lecturer and former faculty member at the University of Ottawa. She gave many talks on the evolution of garden aesthetics and its interaction with cultural practices.

== Collections ==
Her work is included in the collections of the Musée national des beaux-arts du Québec and the National Gallery of Canada.

== Honours ==
In 1988, she received an honorary doctorate from the University of Alberta.

In 1995, Dickson was made a member of the Order of Canada. In 2002, Dickson won the Victor Tolgesy Arts Award from the Council for the Arts in Ottawa.

== Death ==
Dickson died in Ottawa, Ontario, Canada on 18 January 2025, at the age of 88.
