= Ottawa Art Gallery =

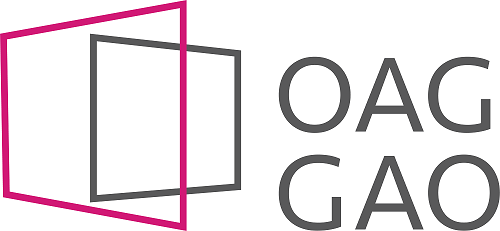
- Established: 1988
- Location: Ottawa, Ontario, Canada
- Coordinates: 45.4259805°N 75.6883851°W
- Type: Municipal gallery
- Director: Alexandra Badzak
- Chairperson: Lawson A.W. Hunter
- Website: www.oaggao.ca//

The Ottawa Art Gallery (OAG) (French: Galerie d’art d’Ottawa (GAO)) is a municipal gallery in Ottawa, Ontario that opened in 1988 at Arts Court. The gallery has a permanent collection of over one thousand works, houses the City of Ottawa-owned Firestone Collection of Canadian Art, and provides community, educational and public programming. The OAG focuses on acquiring, interpreting, and sharing art as well as acting as a cultural meeting place.

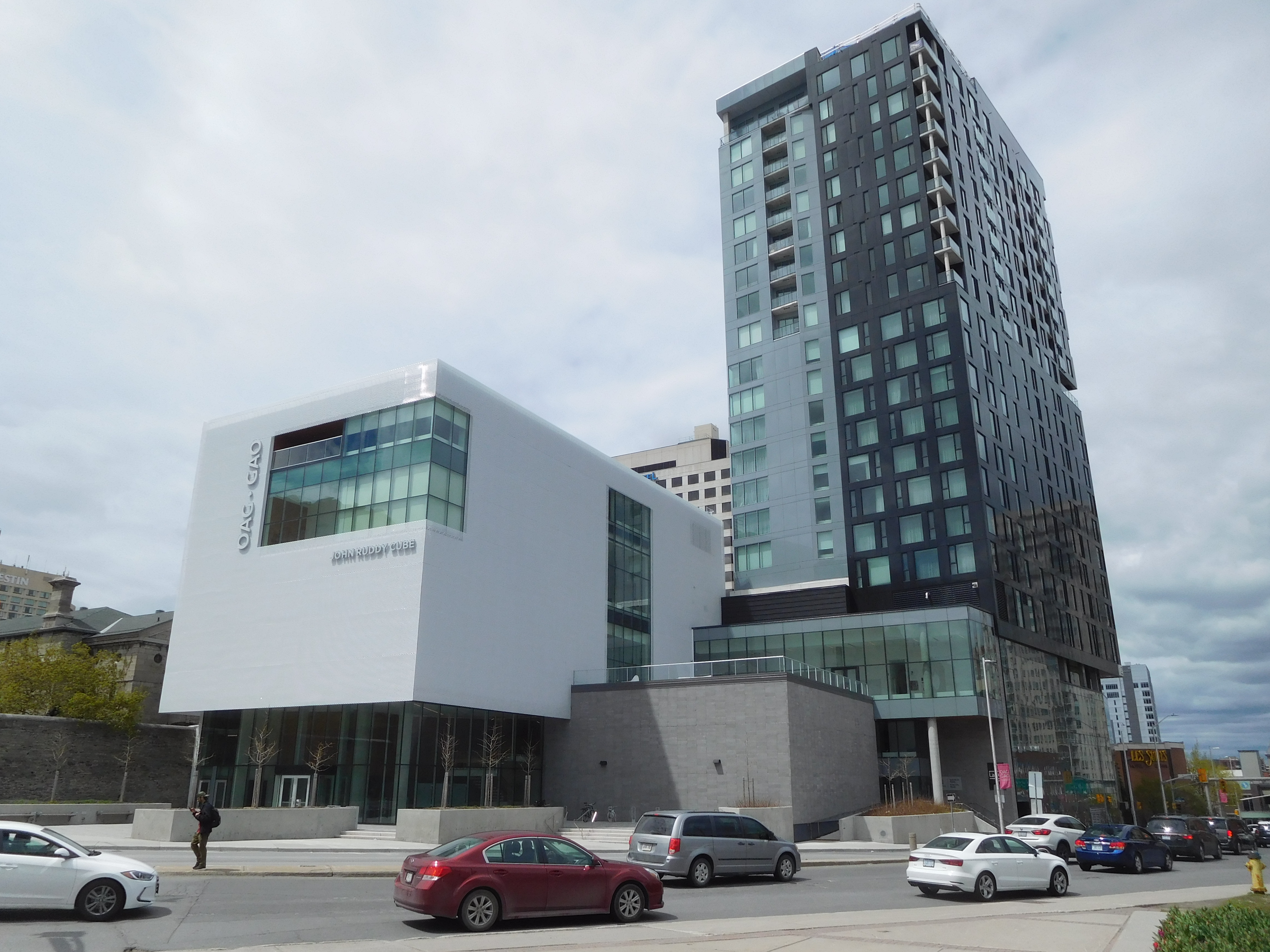
OAG and Le Germain Hotel

== History ==
Founded in an effort by artists to represent local art and the artistic community in the late 1980s, "the Gallery at Arts Court" opened in 1988 in the old County Courthouse building. In 1993, it officially incorporated and changed its name to the Ottawa Art Gallery. The Gallery's opening was preceded by a survey exhibition of local art in 1975 in the Hall of Commerce Building at Lansdowne Park, including over 300 artworks by 156 artists. This exhibition was organized by artists Victor Tolgesy, Gerald Trottier, and James Boyd among others, and was one of the outcomes of the Visual Arts Ottawa coalition formed in 1974. In 1985, with the support of the City Council, the Ottawa Arts Centre Foundation (formed the year prior) identified the Carleton County Courthouse as its intended municipal arts centre which is located on traditional Anishinābe Aki territory. A Visual Arts Office was included in municipal administration the same year, and a municipal art acquisition fund and percent-for-art program created soon after.

Mayo Graham was hired as the first director/curator of the newly opened Gallery in 1989. Renovations to the exhibition spaces were underway by 1991, and by 1992 the OAG received its official designation as Ottawa's Municipal Gallery, prompting the re-opening of the main gallery spaces, the inauguration of the Firestone Gallery to present the recently acquired City of Ottawa-owned Collection, and the development of the Art Rental & Sales gallery in support of acquisitions and programming. In 1993 the Gallery's Board of Directors met for the first time and it was registered as a tax-exempt charity, as well as separating from the Ottawa Arts Centre Foundation and officially becoming its own entity. Taking over as Director in 1993, Mela Constantinidi led the Gallery for seventeen years, concluding this period by winning the Victor Tolgesy Arts Award in 2010 for her contribution to the arts in Ottawa. Alexandra Badzak has served as the OAG's Director and CEO since 2010, and has overseen the OAG Expansion and shepherded the gallery towards its next phase.

== Building and expansion ==
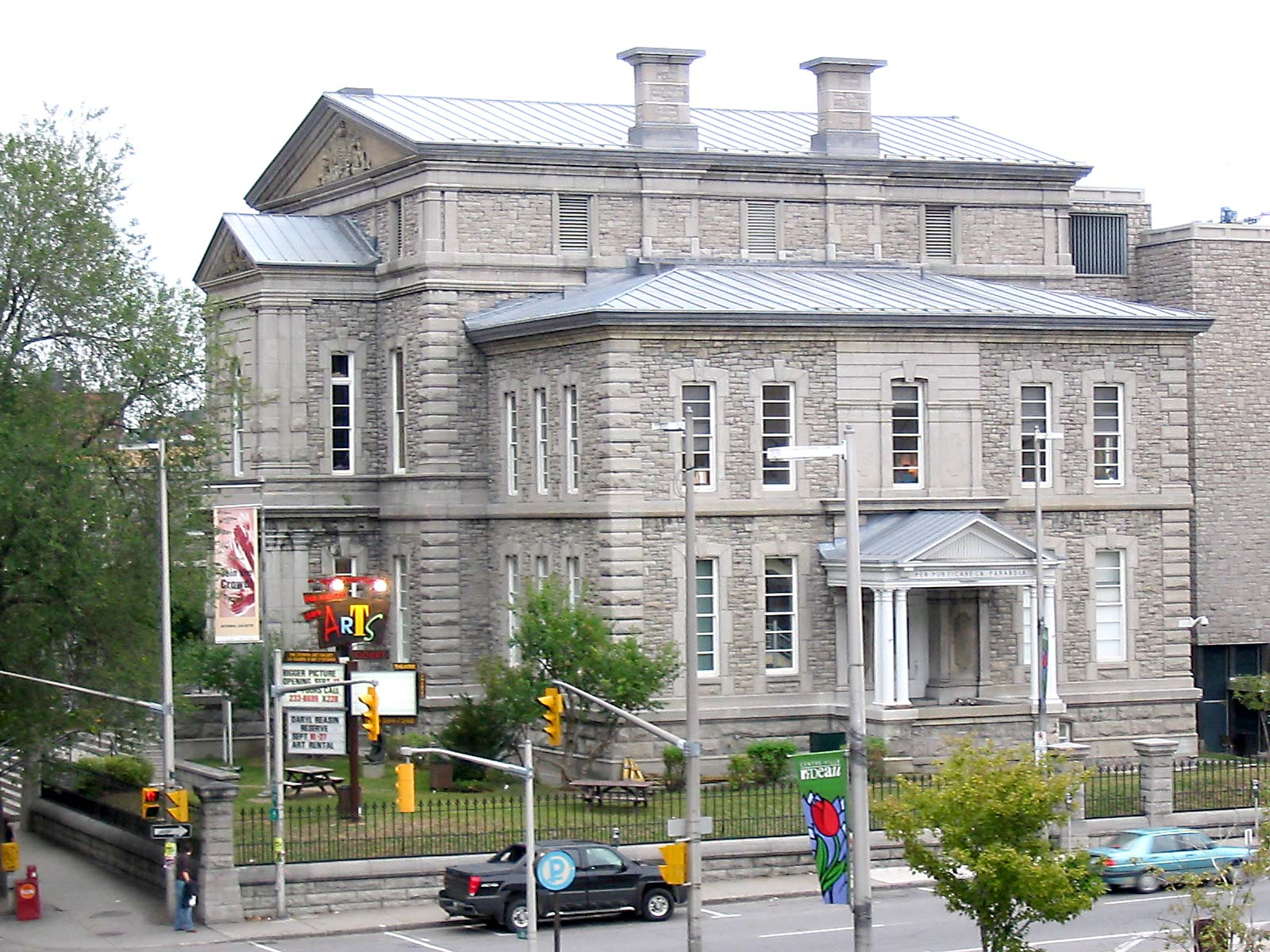
Arts Court, Daly Avenue / Nicholas

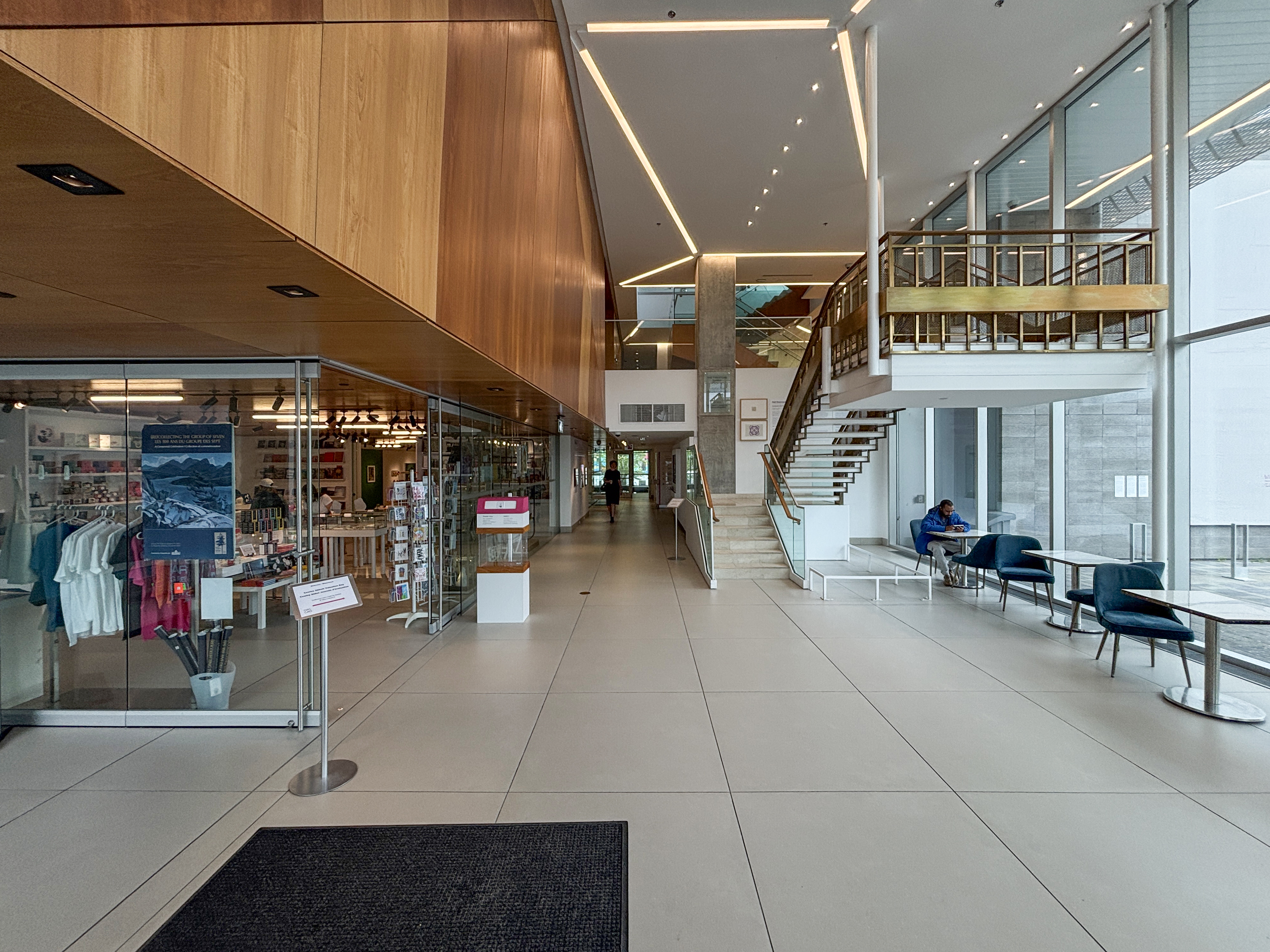
Lobby

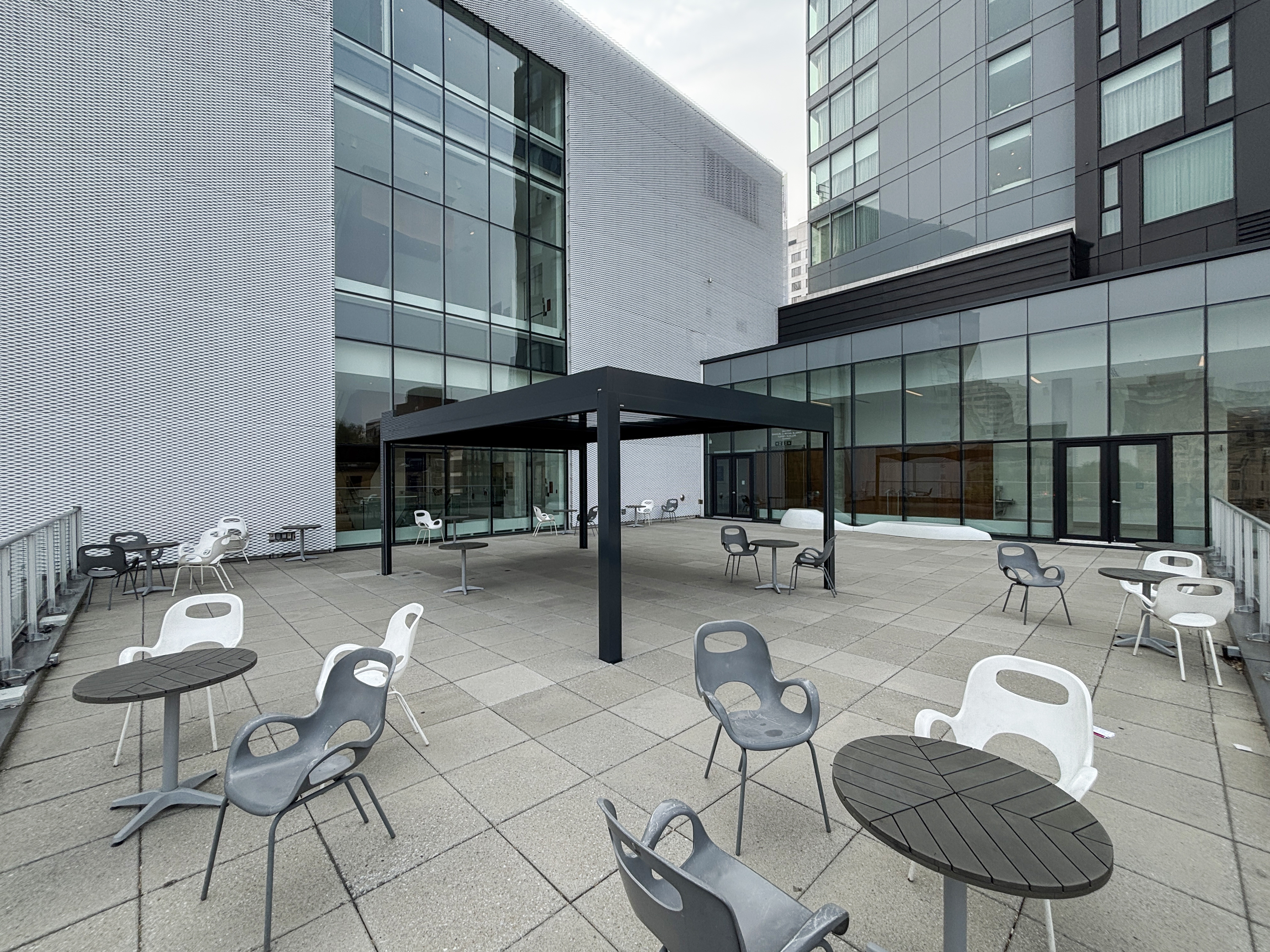
Level 2 South Roof Terrace

Since its founding, the Ottawa Art Gallery had previously resided at Arts Court along with 25 other organizations in the artistic community including SAW Gallery, Canadian Film Institute, Council for the Arts in Ottawa, CARFAC National, Ottawa International Animation Festival, and Ottawa Fringe Festival. Designed by architect Robert Surtees and built in 1870, the Carleton County Courthouse was an important centre for local government and administration. In 1985, the courthouse and its property were entrusted to the Ottawa Arts Court Foundation and later designated as a space for municipal arts in 1988.

With major support from the City of Ottawa and the province of Ontario, as well as donations from community members, the Ottawa Art Gallery constructed a new 55,000 square foot home that more than tripled its previous size. The expanded OAG building opened on 28 April 2018.

With increased governmental funding, the Ottawa Art Gallery was able to develop public programming in the mid-1990s. As the Gallery continues to grow the Public, Educational and Community Programming department has expanded to include programs such as ArtWise, Départ, Creative Sundays, Toddler Mornings, and Art Tent. Along with ongoing programming, the OAG organizes special events that engage the local artistic community.

== Collections ==
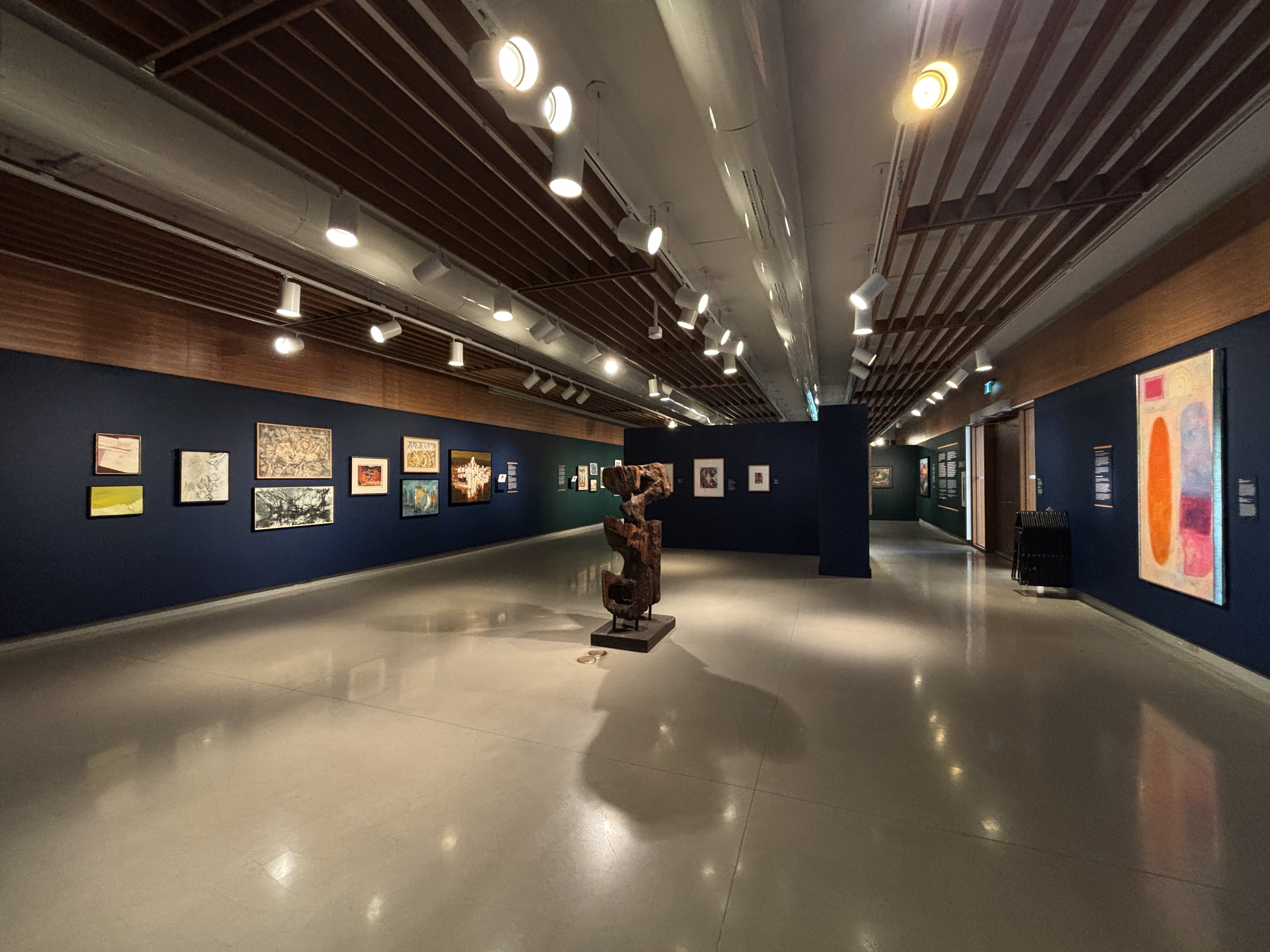
Level 2 Salle Firestone Gallery

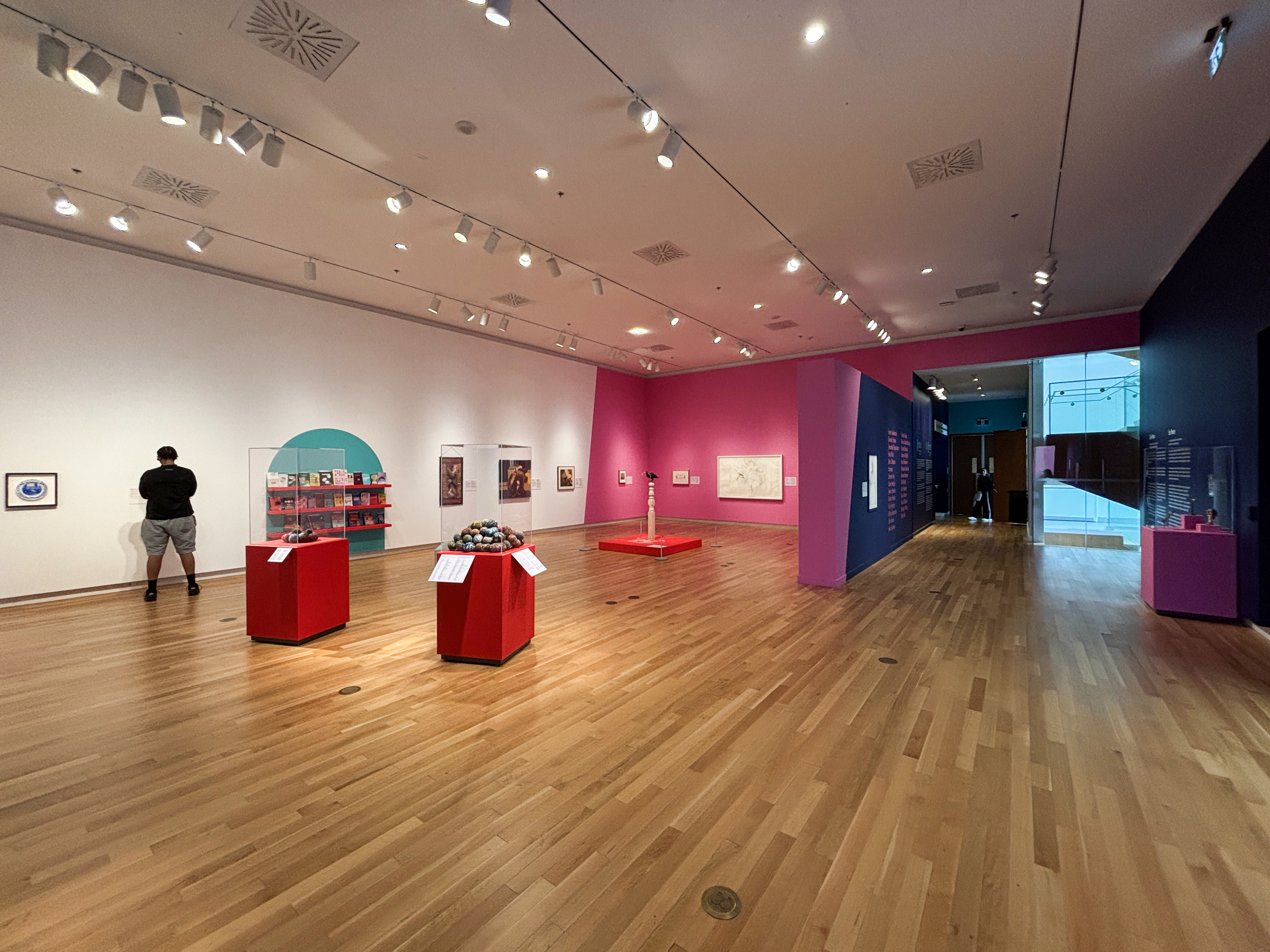
Level 4 Salle Lawson A.W. Hunter Gallery

The OAG cares for two main collections: the City of Ottawa-owned Firestone Collection of Canadian Art, as well as its own permanent collection.

In 1992, Ottawa Art Gallery became the custodian of the Firestone Collection of Canadian Art. Begun by Dr. O.J. (Jack) and Isobel Firestone (née Torontow) in the 1950s, this substantial private collection of twentieth century Canadian art grew through their acquisition of works by artists from coast to coast, and was exhibited and stored in Belmanor, their home in Rockcliffe Park, Ottawa, that they shared with their four children. In 1972, the Firestone family donated 1,200 of their works of art, along with their house and an endowment fund for support, to the Ontario Heritage Foundation (now the Ontario Heritage Trust). Dr. Firestone's second wife, Barbara Firestone (née McMahon) oversaw the Collection's tour through Eastern and Western Europe in the 1980s. They continued collecting until around 1990. In 1992, the Foundation was looking for a new home for the Collection, now numbering 1,600 works of art. The City of Ottawa and the newly established Gallery jointly pursued a successful bid to acquire the Collection, with the arrangement that the city would own it and it would be housed, cared for and exhibited by the Ottawa Art Gallery. Originally named the "Firestone Art Collection," but now known as the Firestone Collection of Canadian Art (FCCA), it includes artwork by prominent Canadian artists such as A.Y. Jackson, Lawren Harris, Arthur Lismer, Edwin Holgate, (members of the Group of Seven), Emily Carr, Alma Duncan, David Milne, and Norval Morrisseau. At the OAG, its artworks have been exhibited in rotating exhibitions within its dedicated Gallery space, borrowed by major institutions including the Montreal Museum of Fine Arts, and toured across the country.

The acquisition of this important historical collection was the foundation upon which was based the beginning of the acquisition of contemporary works of art from the region in the early 1990s by the OAG. Originally known as the Contemporary Collection, and guided by an Acquisitions and Programming Committee, its focus was to begin a collection mapping and record of contemporary Ottawa-Gatineau Art. Now known as the Permanent Collection, it is a holding of upwards of 1,000 works of art, both historical and contemporary, related to the region. Acquisitions are made on a yearly basis, both through donation as well as purchases, and are vetted by the OAG's Director and Curatorial staff as well as the Acquisitions and Programming Committee. The OAG's Permanent Collection includes works by contemporary artists such as Pat Durr, Barry Ace, Lynne Cohen, Evergon, Annie Pootoogook, and Leslie Reid. The estates of artists such as Juan Geuer and Gerald Trottier have donated substantial collections of these artists' works to the Collection. Max Dean donated of 50 of his photographs and installations to the gallery in 2016.
