= Ottawa School of Art =

Art school in Ottawa, Canada

Coordinates: 45°25′37″N 75°41′36″W

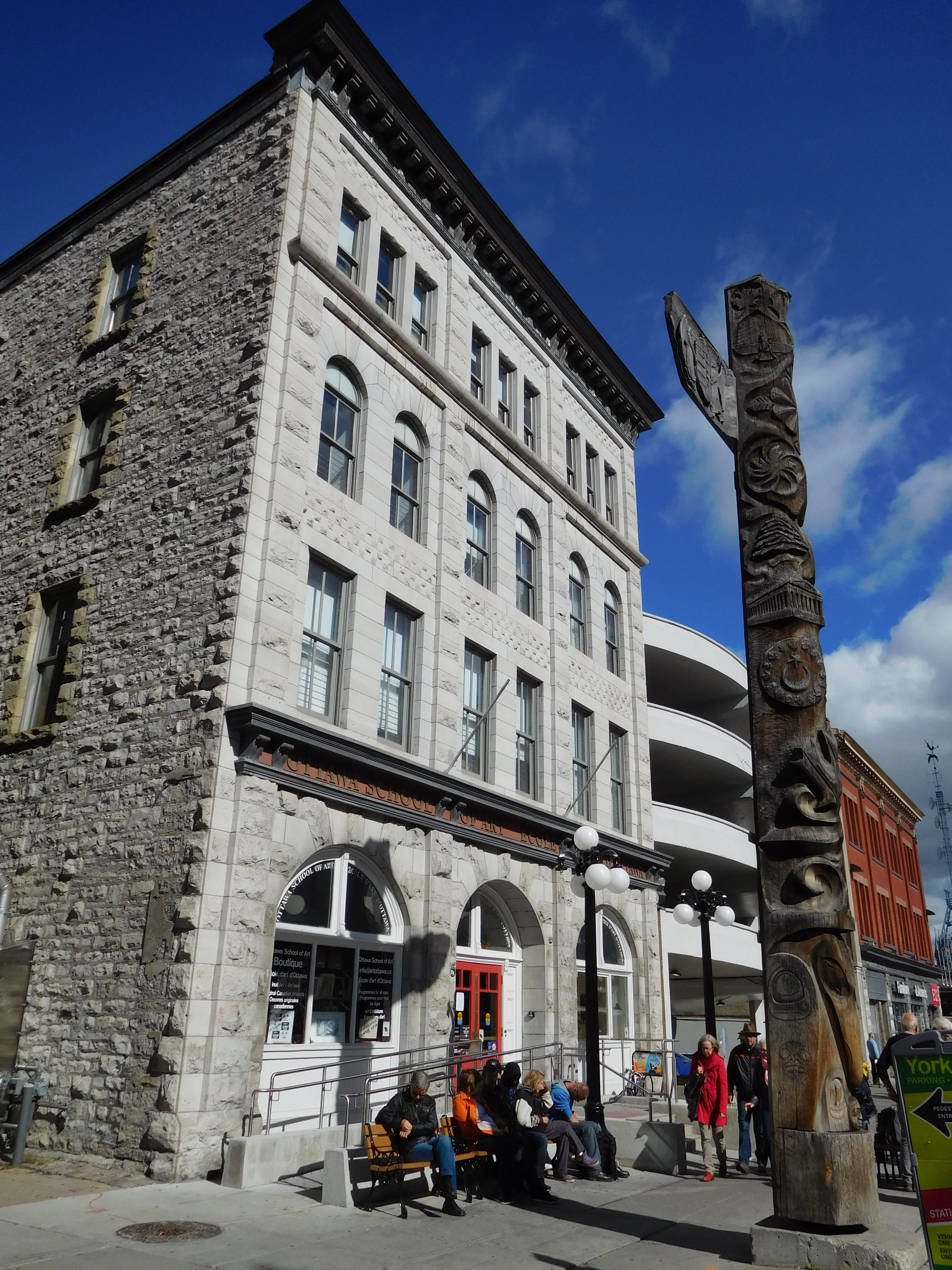

Location
- 35 George Street, Byward Market, Ottawa, ON, K1N 1K2; Ottawa, Ontario

Information
- Director: Jeff Stellick
- Campuses: Downtown and Orleans
- Website: http://artottawa.ca/

The Ottawa School of Art is a non-profit art school in downtown Ottawa, Ontario, Canada. The school offers a one-year certificate program, a three-year diploma program, art camps, and general interest courses, as well as providing exhibition space and a boutique for the display and sale of artwork by local artists and students. The school facilities include a ceramics studio, sculpture studio, wood shop, printmaking studio, a dark room for photography, painting studios, and multipurpose studio spaces where life drawing classes take place.

The three gallery spaces at the Ottawa School of Art's two locations display solo and group exhibitions by local, national, and international artists. The Ottawa School of Art Main Gallery and the Lee Matasi Gallery, which feature both professional and student artwork, are located at the school's headquarters at 35 George Street in Ottawa. The OSA Orleans Campus Gallery is located at the Shenkman Arts Centre at 245 Centrum Boulevard in Ottawa.

== History ==
Starting in 1879 as an association to promote fine arts throughout Canada, the Ottawa School of Art and its associated groups have a long history in the nation's capital. This association made plans to sponsor annual exhibitions in the city, to encourage the creation of a National Gallery of Canada, and to open a School of Art and Design in Ottawa. Their plans came to fruition a year later with the patronage of the Marquis of Lorne and his wife the Princess Louise.

The National Gallery of Canada's permanent collection was started from the early efforts of this National Art Association, forming an academy of artists (Royal Canadian Academy) compiling "diploma" works for the national collection. The academy had its first exhibition in 1880 at the Clarendon Hotel and launched art instruction with one instructor teaching classes to eighteen students at 140 Wellington St.

Known initially as the Ottawa Art School, the school was maintained by the Art Association of Ottawa until 1899 when support grew more sporadic before briefly gaining momentum again in the 1920s and 1930s with regular art instruction, followed by suspension of classes yet again with the arrival of World War II.

It wasn't until 1953 that the school was reinstated with the support of the City of Ottawa as the Municipal Art Centre at a small Billings Bridge schoolhouse. The school acquired its current name, the Ottawa School of Art - École d'art d'Ottawa, in 1977 as well as being registered as a non-profit organization led by a board of directors elected by members the same year. The Ottawa School of Art moved to its current location, a heritage building originally constructed in 1907 for the Ottawa Wine Vault Company Ltd, in 1983.

The Ottawa School of Art is a member of the Council for the Arts in Ottawa, the Ontario Arts Council, the Ontario Ministry of Culture & Communications, the Canada Council, and the Regional Municipality of Ottawa-Carleton.

== Programs ==
The Ottawa School of Art offers two credit programs: the Portfolio Certificate Program and the Fine Arts Diploma Program. The intensive one year Portfolio Certificate Program is designed to help students develop a portfolio of work for applications to college and university visual arts programs. The Portfolio Certificate Program is equivalent to a year or partial year of credits at some Canadian art schools such as the Ontario College of Art and Design, the University of Lethbridge, and Mount Allison University. The three year Fine Arts Diploma Program allows students to explore a variety of mediums including drawing, painting, sculpture, photography, printmaking, and ceramics, building up to a studio concentration in one of those mediums along with mentorship opportunities and a graduate exhibition. The Ottawa School of Art also showcases the expertise of its instructors at the annual Instructors Exhibition held at the main gallery at the beginning of the fall term, giving students a sense of the techniques and styles being taught at the school. The small class sizes in each program allow for more hands-on training and close instruction. The Ottawa School of Art programs are open to local and international students with a high school diploma. Programs for children and teens run from the fall through the spring and are offered in French and English. In addition to their term-length courses, the Ottawa School of Art engages in the local arts community by offering artist-in-residence workshops.

== Community engagement ==
Along with participating in local arts community events such as Ottawa's Nuit Blanche, the Ottawa School of Art collaborates with local artists and groups to encourage artistic production and community involvement in the city. The Ottawa School of Art partners with other local art organizations such as the Ottawa-Gatineau Printmakers Collective for events that bring together members of the artistic community such as print exchanges and workshops. In celebration of Canada's 150th anniversary, the Ottawa School of Art partnered with Ottawa 2017, Ottawa Community Housing, and the Embassy of Imagination to create four murals painted from May to July 2017. The mural at 87 George Street in downtown Ottawa was painted by Cape Dorset youth and named Tunnganarniq, meaning “fostering good spirits by being open, welcoming and inclusive,” while the series of murals is named Illunaata, meaning “all together” in Inuktitut.
