= Firestone Collection of Canadian Art =

The Firestone Collection of Canadian Art (French: Collection Firestone d'art canadien) is a collection of over 1600 works of twentieth-century Canadian art amassed by Ottawa residents O.J. and Isobel Firestone beginning in the 1950s. It is now a public collection owned by the City of Ottawa, and under the custodianship of the Ottawa Art Gallery. There are dedicated gallery and storage spaces at the Ottawa Art Gallery for the Collection. Furthermore, the original marble and brass staircase from the Firestone home is now located as the main feature of the lobby of the new Ottawa Art Gallery building at 50 Mackenzie King Bridge.

== History ==
Otto Jack Firestone immigrated to Canada from Austria in 1938, moving to Ottawa to work as an economist for the Federal Government after completing his master's degree in the subject at McGill University in 1942. Inspired by visits to the National Gallery of Canada, in the following years Firestone and his wife, concert pianist Isobel Torontow, visited artists' studios and began collecting their art. Through their avid collecting the couple formed bonds with well-known members of the Canadian art world including Group of Seven member, A.Y. Jackson.

The Firestones began constructing their new three-storey, 8,000-square-foot home in Rockcliffe Park at 375 Minto Place in 1960. Named for Isobel, "Belmanor" was a new larger home constructed to accommodate the Firestone's growing art collection with temperature and humidity control and exhibition lighting. The modernist building became a social hub for friends of the Firestones and members of the arts community. The Firestone family made the decision to donate their collection (at that time numbering around 1200 works of art), their home, and a $100,000 endowment fund for art conservation and maintenance to the Ontario Heritage Foundation (now the Ontario Heritage Trust) in 1972. The artwork remained on display in the home, and O.J. Firestone conducted regular tours for the visiting public by appointment.

O.J. and Isobel Firestone divorced in 1978, and Firestone remarried, to Barbara MacMahon. Barbara Firestone spearheaded two tours of the Collection to Western and Eastern Europe in the 1980s. In 1991, the Ontario Heritage Foundation decided the Collection, now numbering 1600 works of art, needed a new home as Firestone was moving out of his home at Minto Place for health reasons. He could no longer maintain the collection and continue to give tours, so he moved into a home overlooking the Ottawa River, giving him a Group of Seven view. A joint bid was submitted by the City of Ottawa and the newly incorporated Ottawa Art Gallery to acquire the "Firestone Art Collection," as it was then known. They won the bid, and the City obtained ownership of the nationally important Collection by promising new spaces dedicated to its maintenance and display within the Ottawa Art Gallery.

June 6, 1992 marked the inaugural exhibition Treasures from the Firestone Art Collection at the Ottawa Art Gallery, and it was attended by both O.J. and Isobel Firestone, Glenn McInnes the first chair of the board of directors, and Mayo Graham, the first director of the Gallery. Revealing the new gallery spaces and the newly acquired Firestone Art Collection, the exhibition emphasized its size and breadth and included works by prominent Canadian artists Maurice Cullen, Lawren S. Harris, Emily Carr, Paul-Émile Borduas, and David Milne. This 1992 exhibition was part of the Ottawa Art Gallery's re-opening after renovations to the gallery spaces including the creation of the Firestone Gallery, marking a pivotal moment in the history of both the Firestone Art Collection and the Ottawa Art Gallery. O.J. Firestone commented on the significance of the relocation himself at the event when he declared, "The collection is now standing on its own feet...here it has room to breathe."

Funds from the sale of the Firestone home went towards renovating Arts Court, including the creation of the Firestone Gallery, and maintaining the collection. Since then, the art collection, now known as the Firestone Collection of Canadian Art (FCCA) has been featured in rotating displays at the Ottawa Art Gallery, including thematically curated exhibitions as well as a permanent exhibition.

After being sold and rented for several years, the Firestone home was eventually demolished in 2007 by the owner due to the amount of repairs needed (heating issues and moisture damage). The new home built in place of the Firestone home maintains some stylistic elements of the original architecture. The owner invited the Ottawa Art Gallery to document and retrieve features of the home before demolishing it, however, and the Gallery then stored those items (the staircase, paneling, coffers, and brass screens) in archival storage with plans to incorporate them into a new building.

The new Ottawa Art Gallery building opening early 2018 provides larger gallery spaces for the Firestone Gallery as well as the marble staircase from the Firestone home, acquired in 2007, which will lead visitors from the lobby to the Firestone Gallery. In addition to the original staircase from the Firestone home, the new Firestone Gallery also has brass and teak wood elements reminiscent of the interior design of the home to re-contextualize the Collection in the new space.

== Inside the Collection ==
Including paintings, drawings, prints and sculpture from across Canada, the Firestone Collection of Canadian Art contains a variety of mediums and styles. Of the 1600 artworks in the Collection 1059 are works on paper, including charcoal and graphite sketches, watercolour and acrylic washes as well as collage. Before it was handed over to the City of Ottawa and the Ottawa Art Gallery, O.J. Firestone organized his collection into historical, regional, and subject matter categories. Within the historical category Firestone distinguished three time periods, the first being 1867-1914 representing the period of domestic landscape painting, the second being 1919-1939 representing the period of nationalistic art and work by the Group of Seven, and the third being 1945–present representing non-figurative and "internationally oriented" art. According to Firestone, there were two main groups in the Canadian art scene represented in his art collection: the Group of Seven and French Canadian artists. For some artists in the Collection, the Firestones acquired a piece from every year of their artistic career or from key years. The Firestone Collection of Canadian Art represents art collected from the 1950s, through until 1985.

== Exhibitions ==
Before being relocated to the Ottawa Art Gallery, the Firestone Art Collection was on display in the Firestone home and viewed by the public during tours led by O. J. Firestone. Among the conditions of the donation of the collection to the Ontario Heritage Foundation was that the collection was to be on display and accessible to the public in the Ottawa area. The Firestone Collection of Canadian Art has been exhibited and re-interpreted in many ways since its arrival at the Ottawa Art Gallery, including shows focusing on single artists in the Collection and shows arranged around particular themes drawn from the Collection.

After the inaugural exhibition in 1992, the Ottawa Art Gallery regularly exhibited selections of thirty to forty artworks from the Firestone Collection, presenting themes such as landscapes and cityscapes, waterways, the impact of the Group of Seven, and the influence of European art movements on Canadian Art. Exhibitions of works from the Firestone Collection were also enhanced by loans of artworks from other Canadian institutions, as well as being placed in dialogue with contemporary artwork from the Ottawa Art Gallery's permanent collection. An educational program started in 1996 called Students Interpret the Firestone Collection of Canadian Art gave local high school students studying visual arts an opportunity to create and display artwork inspired by the Collection.

Upon arriving at the Ottawa Art Gallery the Firestone Art Collection was catalogued with files created on each artist, a resource library created to house relevant art-historical texts, and publications and promotional material circulated to other Canadian art institutions since that time. Lectures and panel discussions regarding exhibited works from the Firestone Art Collection have also drawn scholarly attention, as O.J. Firestone had wished for. To increase the accessibility of the Collection, pieces from the collection have toured overseas as well as continuing to travel throughout Canada to art institutions.

The 2004 exhibition Full Space: Modern Art from the Firestone Collection of Canadian Art curated by Emily Falvey, was the Ottawa Art Gallery's first national touring exhibition of the Firestone Collection of Canadian Art. The 2005 exhibition Private Eye: Choosing Ottawa for a National Collection curated by Catherine Sinclair and coinciding with the 150th anniversary of the City of Ottawa aimed to display never before seen works from the Collection. The 2008 exhibition Le Salon: Celebrating 35 Years of the Firestone Collection of Canadian Art also curated by Catherine Sinclair celebrated the history of the Collection and the contribution of the Firestones to the local art community. More recent exhibitions showing the breadth of the collection and artworks relating to geographic locations from across Canada include the 2010 exhibition At Land's End showing artworks that explore the relationship between land and sea and the 2016 exhibition Coast to Coast: Features from the Firestone Collection of Canadian Art exploring works from artists across the nation.

== Notable works ==
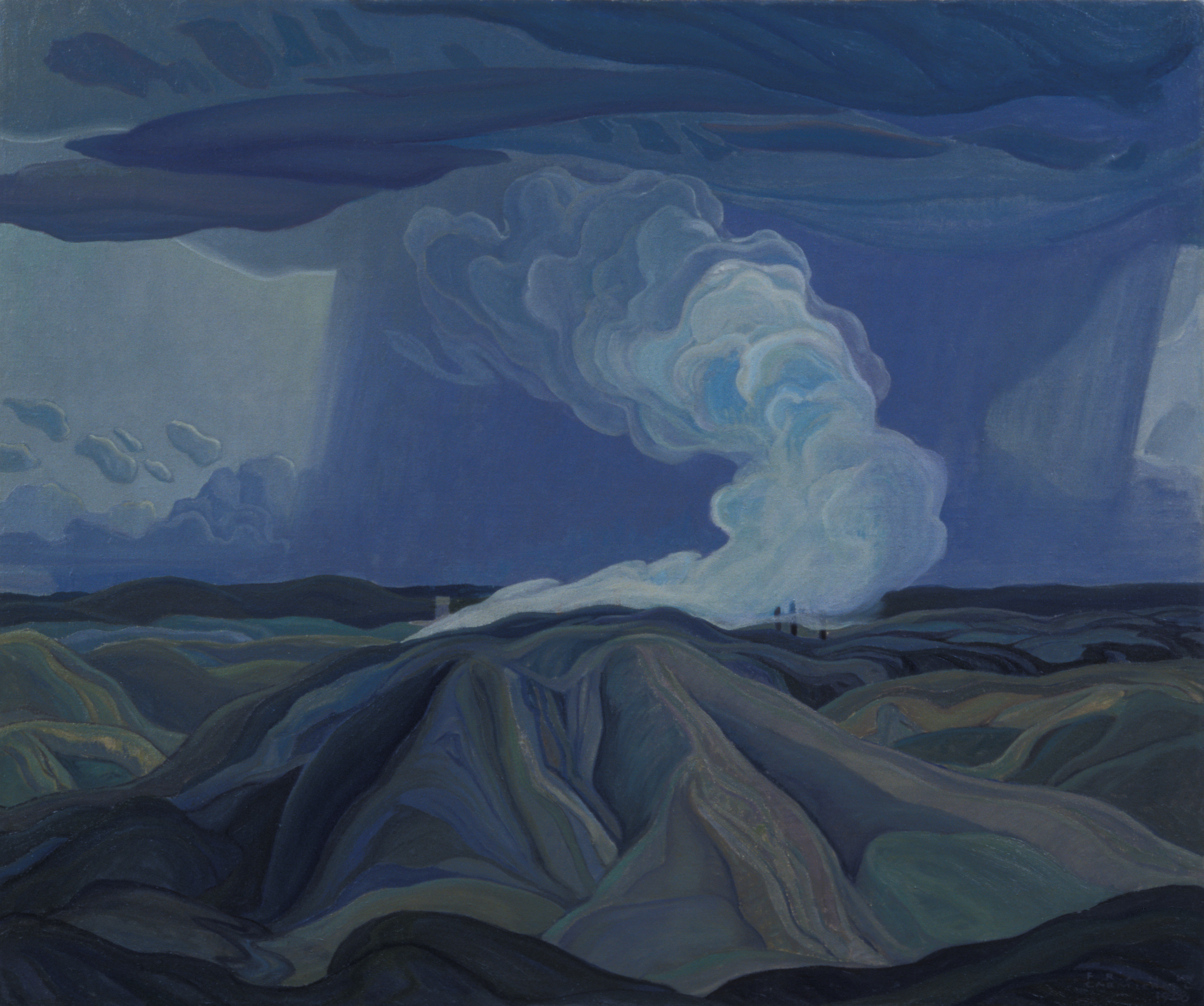
Franklin Carmichael, The Nickel Belt, 1928. Oil on canvas. 101.8 cm x 122.0 cm. Firestone Collection of Canadian Art, Ottawa Art Gallery.

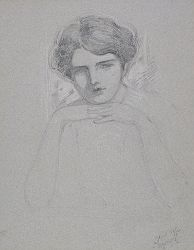
Wilfred Molson Barnes, Female Head, 1912. Drawing. 31.6 x 25.1 cm. Firestone Collection of Canadian Art, Ottawa Art Gallery.

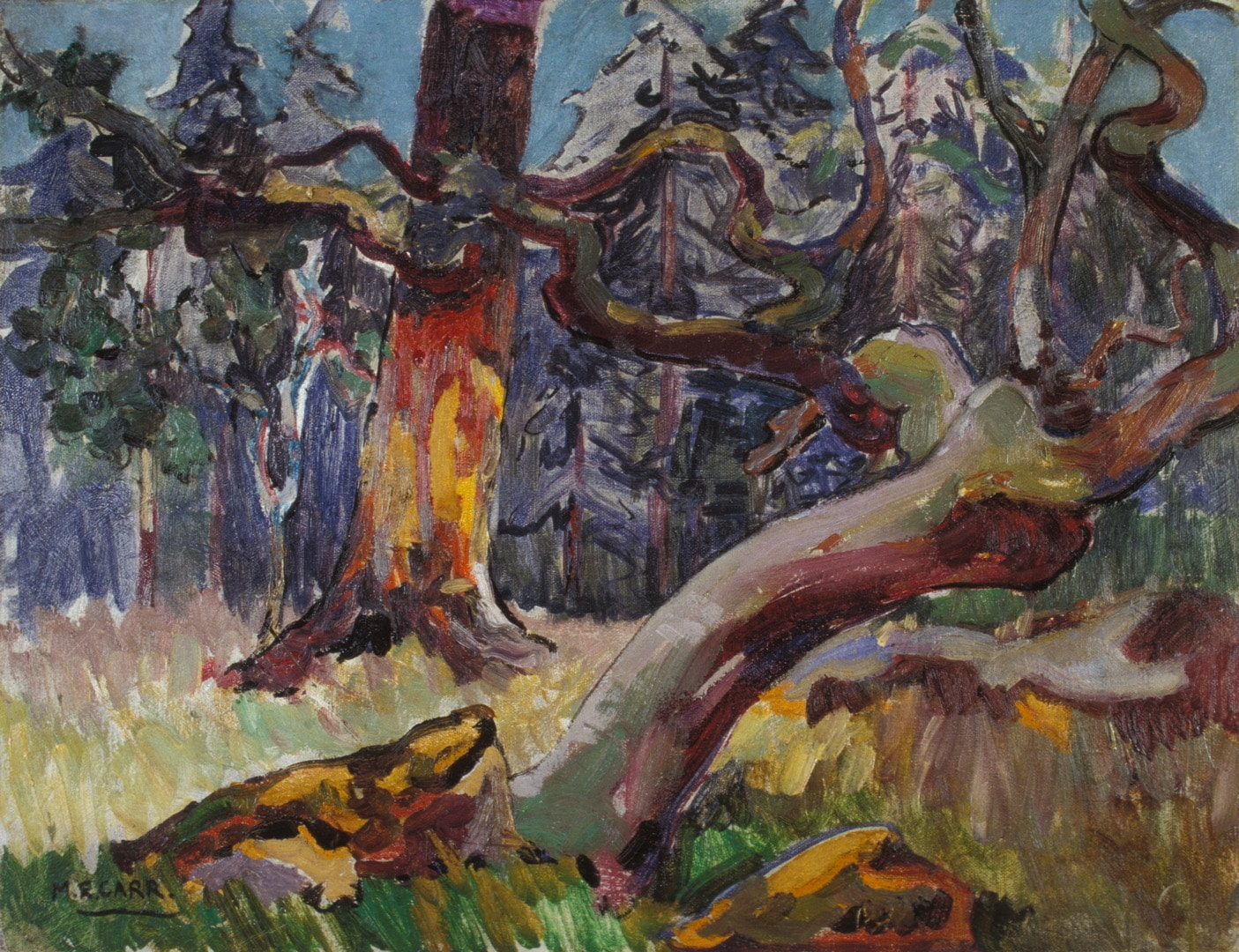
Emily Carr, Sunlight in the Forest, 1912. Oil on linen. 43.4 x 56.3 cm. Firestone Collection of Canadian Art, Ottawa Art Gallery.

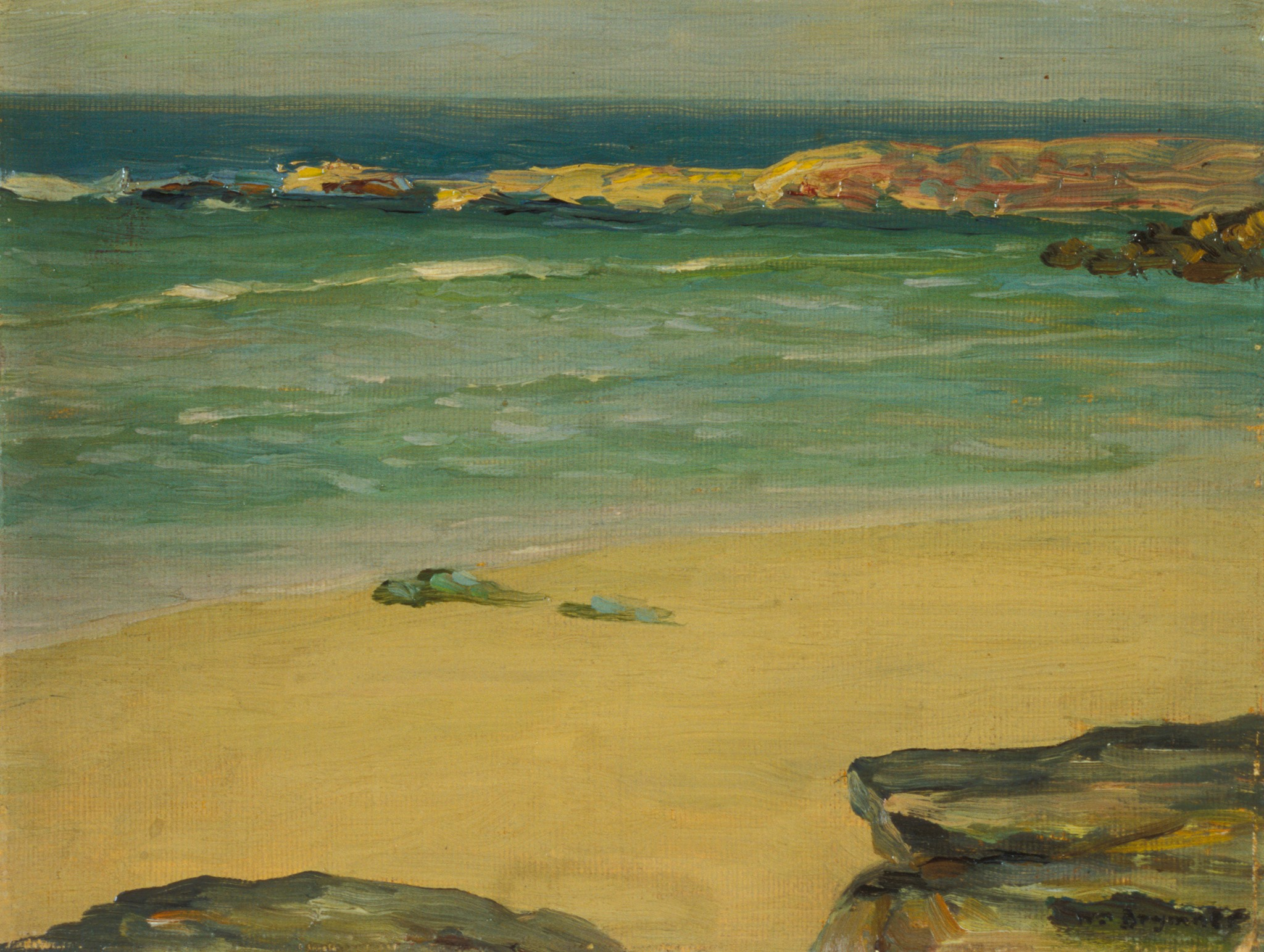
William Brymner, Near Beauport, St. Lawrence River, 1900. Oil on canvas board. 18.1 x 24.3 cm. Firestone Collection of Canadian Art, Ottawa Art Gallery.
