= Victor Tolgesy =

Canadian artist (1928-1980)

- Born: August 22, 1928; Miskolc, Hungary
- Died: January 6, 1980 (aged 51); Ottawa, Ontario
- Known for: sculptor

Victor Tolgesy RCA (22 August 1928 – 6 January 1980) was a Hungarian-born Canadian sculptor. The Victor Tolgesy Arts Award is named in his honor.

== Life and work ==
Tolgesy was born in Miskolc, Hungary on 22 August 1928. He emigrated to Canada in 1951. He died in Ottawa, Ontario, 6 January 1980.

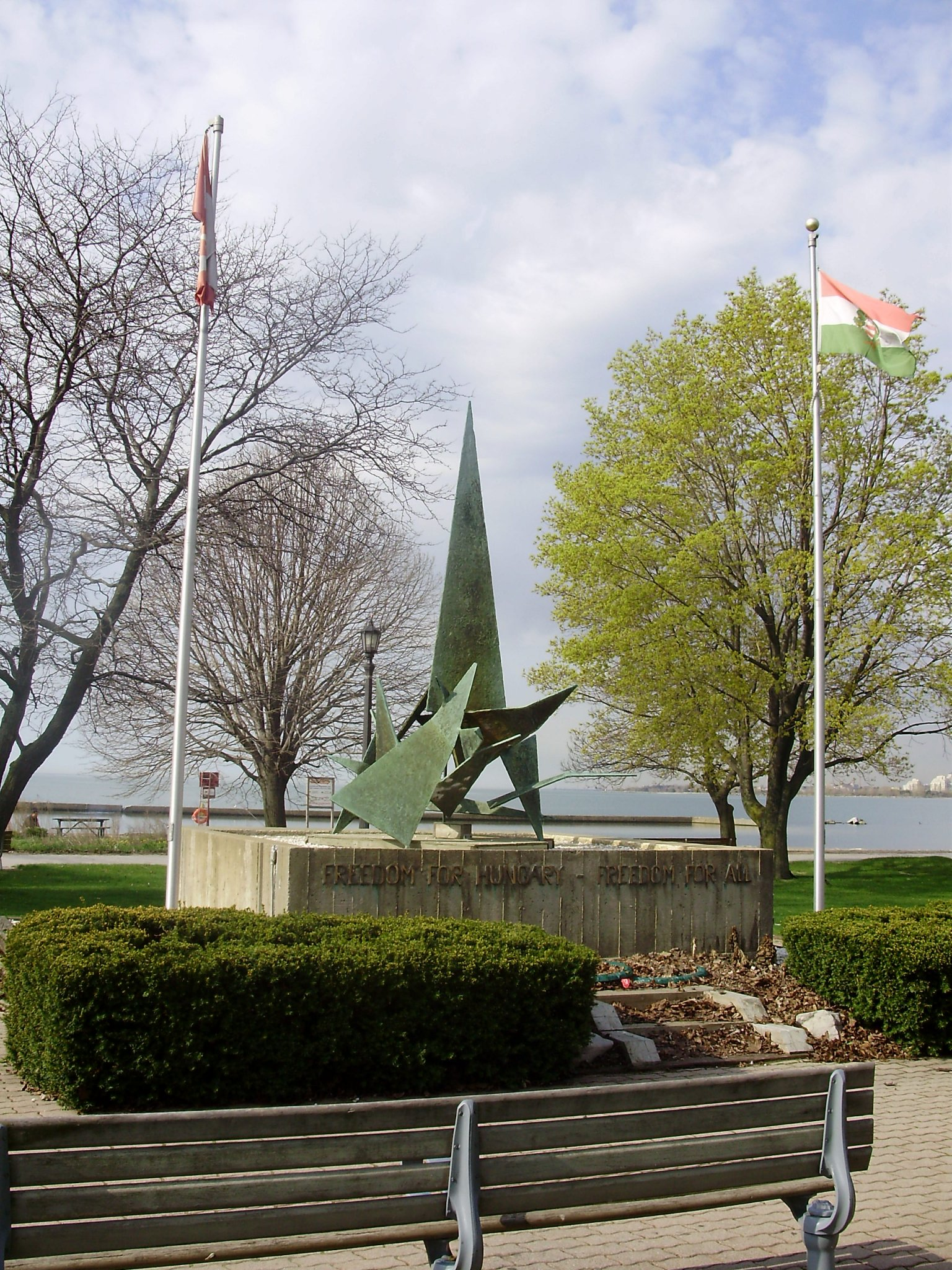
Freedom for Hungary—Freedom for All (1966) Budapest Park, Toronto

Tolgesy was made a member of the Royal Canadian Academy of Arts

In 1966, a sculpture by Tolgesy, Freedom for Hungary—Freedom for All was installed in Budapest Park in Toronto to commemorate the tenth anniversary of the Hungarian Uprising.

== Legacy ==
The Victor Tolgesy Arts Award is presented jointly by the City of Ottawa and the Council for the Arts in Ottawa to recognize residents who have contributed to the cultural life of Ottawa. The first award was presented in 1987. The award consists of cash prize and a bronze casting of Tolgesy's 1963 sculpture Seed and Flower.

== More ==
Tolgesy, Victor. Acrobatics: A Tale of Fantasy and Reality in Words and Sculpture (Ottawa:Edahl Productions Limited, 1985) ISBN 0969120532, 9780969120537 A 'modern fairy tale' illustrated with color photographs of the author's sculptures.
