= Council for the Arts in Ottawa =

Canadian charity

Logo for the Council for the Arts in Ottawa

The Council for the Arts in Ottawa (CAO) is a Canadian non-profit membership-based registered charity which promotes the arts. It focuses on services for its diverse membership. Through advocacy, information and advice to members, it seeks to increase public interest and support for the arts in the National Capital Region. Its membership includes over 200 artists and arts organizations, and individual and corporate supporters of the arts.

== Mandate ==
The CAO works to raise the profile of the arts in Ottawa, develop arts policy, and educate the public on issues that affect the arts community. Through strengthening relationships with government and offering specialized services to its members, the Council promotes a more robust financial commitment to the arts and aims to reflect the region's shifting cultural identity.

== Funding ==
The Council is funded primarily by the City of Ottawa and the Ontario Arts Council. Each year it receives additional funding from multiple sources, including corporations, foundations, and other government bodies.

== Governance ==
Former textile designer Ottawa-born Peter Honeywell is the Executive Director of the Council. He has held the position since 1991, and as well as acting as an advisor to boards and other arts organizations, Honeywell has been a member of the Ontario Minister's Advisory Council for Art and Culture since 2010.

The CAO is led by a 12-member board of directors with Mr. Honeywell.

== Brief history ==
Based on a recommendation from the Mayor of Ottawa's Advisory Committee on the Arts, the CAO was founded in 1982. It produced a 17-day arts festival featuring 65 events that showcased the arts across disciplines. Council activities also included producing catalogues, managing a space for 40 working artists and a gallery, publishing a bi-monthly 28-page tabloid, producing provincial and regional conferences, advocacy, skills workshops and special arts projects.

By 1990, the CAO was running a major deficit. After community consultations, the Council downsized and refocused its efforts from arts production to providing services to artists and arts organizations in the region. Through an aggressive program to restore the Council to fiscal health, the CAO's debt was eliminated in its entirety by 1994.

== Partners, programs, and activities ==
With partners, the CAO has founded five awards granted annually. They include the Business Recognition Award that acknowledges businesses that have made a significant contribution to the local arts community, and the Victor Tolgesy Arts Award, established in memory of the Hungarian-born Ottawa-based sculptor. He was one of the artists who received commissions for Expo 67. Working with Corel Corporation and the Royal Bank of Canada, the Council has established the Corel Arts Award (1998) and the RBC Emerging Artist Award (2010). It also regularly partners with artists and arts organizations on projects and campaigns. Key partners include CARFAC Ontario, Ottawa Arts Court Foundation, AOE Arts Council, Ottawa Art Gallery, Culture Days and the City of Ottawa.

In 2010–11, the Council completed a landmark two-year research project, Arts and the Capital City. The report explored the many dimensions of the arts in the nation's capital including capital funding, infrastructure, and sustainable arts practices.

== Advocacy for arts funding ==
Committed to active advocacy for stable and long term funding for local arts publicly and behind-the-scenes, the Council has helped to build and lead several campaigns against cuts.

In response to the Harris government cutbacks to the arts in the late 1990s, the CAO was involved in developing Community Arts Ontario, a provincial network of organizations and individuals that support the arts.

In the 2000s, CAO threw itself into the campaign for the reinstatement of a proposed $500,000 cut to arts funding in the municipal budget by working with other arts organizations and individuals. Together they developed two Ottawa arts awareness campaigns. A campaign called My Ottawa includes Culture was launched in 2004. Through town hall meetings, demonstrations and information campaigns, the cuts were eventually reversed.

== 2008–2009 Controversy: invitation to Larry O'Brien, Mayor of Ottawa, revoked ==
When a $6 million cut to the arts loomed in 2008 for the 2009 city budget, the campaign was reborn as, My Ottawa Still includes Culture with a new tactic. The traditional invitation given to the Mayor of Ottawa to give the keynote speech at the Council's annual fundraiser was revoked.

The Council always invites the sitting Mayor to deliver a keynote speech to the Sweetheart Lunch for the Arts, and the "un-invitation" was interpreted as a response to the cuts and dramatically raised the public profile of the issue.

Through the combined efforts of all the arts organizations and supporters of the arts fighting the cuts, the proposed $6 million cuts were reversed.

== Location ==
The CAO offices and board room are located in rented premises at the Arts Court, Ottawa's central municipal cultural complex. The building was constructed in 1870 and was the Carleton County Courthouse. The Micaela Fitch Room, the Council's board room, was renovated by CAO volunteers in 1999. The work revealed a 14-foot brick vaulted ceiling and arched windows. Since its complete restoration, the space is used for meetings, classes, auditions, workshops and receptions.
