= Ann MacIntosh Duff =

Canadian artist (1925–2022)

- Born: 14 July 1925; Toronto, Ontario, Canada
- Died: 3 December 2022 (aged 97); Toronto, Ontario, Canada
- Education: Central Technical School, Toronto (1944–1946) with Peter Haworth; Queen`s University, Kingston, summers studied with André Biéler and Caven Atkins
- Awards: Member in 1973, Royal Canadian Academy; Queen's Jubilee Medal (1977)

Ann MacIntosh Duff RCA (14 July 1925 – 3 December 2022) was a Canadian artist known for her watercolour paintings.

== Biography ==
MacIntosh Duff was born in Toronto on 14 July 1925, the daughter of John MacIntosh and Constance Hamilton Duff. The painter and graphic artist Walter R. Duff was her father's cousin. She worked at one of two places - at her home in Toronto or at her Georgian Bay cottage at Pointe au Baril, Ontario. She painted from memory, landscapes of the mind, as she called them.

In 1951, MacIntosh Duff became a member of the Canadian Society of Painters in Water Colour (CSPWC) and remained an active member for thirty years. In 1959, she began working with Douglas Duncan at the Picture Loan Society until Duncan's death in 1968. She was also an active member of the Ontario Society of Artists (she was elected in 1961) and the Canadian Society of Graphic Art (elected 1963) and the Royal Canadian Academy (1973). In 2007, the Tom Thomson Art Gallery in Owen Sound held a retrospective of MacIntosh Duff’s work titled To Love and To Cherish. In 2023, the McMichael Canadian Art Collection held a posthumous show of her work.

Her work is included in the collections of the National Gallery of Canada and the Royal Collection, as part of the Royal Collection Project. In 1977, she was awarded the Queen's Silver Jubilee Medal; in 1984, she received an Honorary Award from the Canadian Society of Painters in Water Colour. She was represented in Toronto by the Nicholas Metivier Gallery.

MacIntosh Duff died at her home in Toronto on 3 December 2022, at the age of 97.
