= John Arthur Fraser =

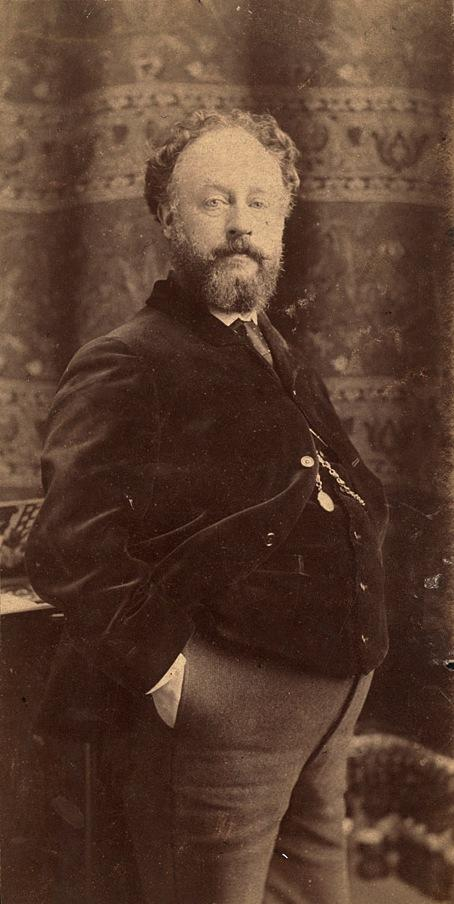
- Fraser c. 1875
- Born: 9 January 1838; London, England
- Died: 1 January 1898 (aged 59); New York City, USA
- Occupations: Artist, businessman and teacher

John Arthur Fraser (also known as John A. Fraser and J. A. Fraser) RCA (9 January 1838 – 1 January 1898) was an English artist, photography entrepreneur and teacher. He undertook various paintings for the Canadian Pacific Railway. He is known for his highly realistic landscapes of Canada and the United States, many of them watercolor paintings.

== Life ==
=== Early years (1838–1860) ===
John Arthur Fraser was born on 9 January 1838 in London, England. His parents were John Fraser of Portsoy, Scotland, and Isabella Warren of London. His father was a tailor and an outspoken supporter of the Chartist movement. His father's parents had moved to Stanstead in the Eastern Townships of Lower Canada (Quebec) as pioneers in 1831. Fraser may have taken evening classes in drawing at the Royal Academy Schools around 1852, and later he was described as "a pupil of the South Kensington Schools", but neither school has any record of him. On 4 April 1858 he married Anne Maria Sayer in Forest Hill, London, describing himself as an artist on his marriage certificate. They had three sons and three daughters. Very soon after his marriage he moved with his wife and parents to Stanstead, Lower Canada, where his grandmother had lost her husband two years earlier.

=== Montreal (1860–1869) ===
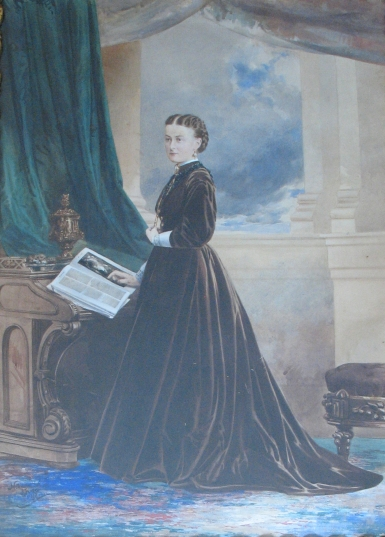
Alice Starr Chipman Tilley (1868) watercolour over photograph

John Arthur had moved to Montreal by 1860, looking for work as a decorative painter. His father also moved to Montreal and worked as a book agent while writing on politics until his death in 1872. Fraser became a photograph tinter with William Notman's firm. Notman had been paying William Raphael on commission, but was not satisfied with his work. He engaged Fraser in 1860 as his main artist, with the young Henry Sandham as his assistant. Fraser was paid a salary of $125 per month.

Over time Fraser's art department grew to employ a large staff that coloured photographs, retouched negatives and painted backgrounds. Painted photographs were made from the carte-de-visite size, 3.5 by 2.25 inches (89 by 57 mm), or the cabinet photograph size, 5 by 3.5 inches (127 by 89 mm). The negatives were projected onto sensitized paper and processed in the normal way. The paper was then pasted onto canvas on a stretcher frame, or onto cardboard, and after the artist had done their work was place in an ornamental guilt frame by Notman's framing department.

The work of Fraser and Sandham was included in Notman's first book Photographic selections (1863), which also included work by Montreal artists such as Otto Reinhold Jacobi, C. J. Way and Robert Stuart Duncanson. Fraser's genre painting of a pond with children in the foreground was entitled Sunshine and Shower. The text by Thomas Davies King said that the artist "has not had more opportunity of following a branch of art in which he would be successful", an allusion to Fraser's work supervising Notman's art department.

Fraser also exhibited oil paintings of New Hampshire and Eastern Township landscapes with the Art Association of Montreal, and sold these paintings through dealers. Notman was a charter member and ongoing supporter of the Art Association of Montreal. His studio became a center for members of the artistic community of Montreal and visitors from elsewhere. In 1867 Fraser, Sandham, and Fraser's brother William Lewis Fraser were charter members of the Society of Canadian Artists, which was organized in Notman's studio. In May 1868 Fraser was elected a member of the New York-based American Society of Painters in Water Colors.

=== Toronto (1868–1885) ===
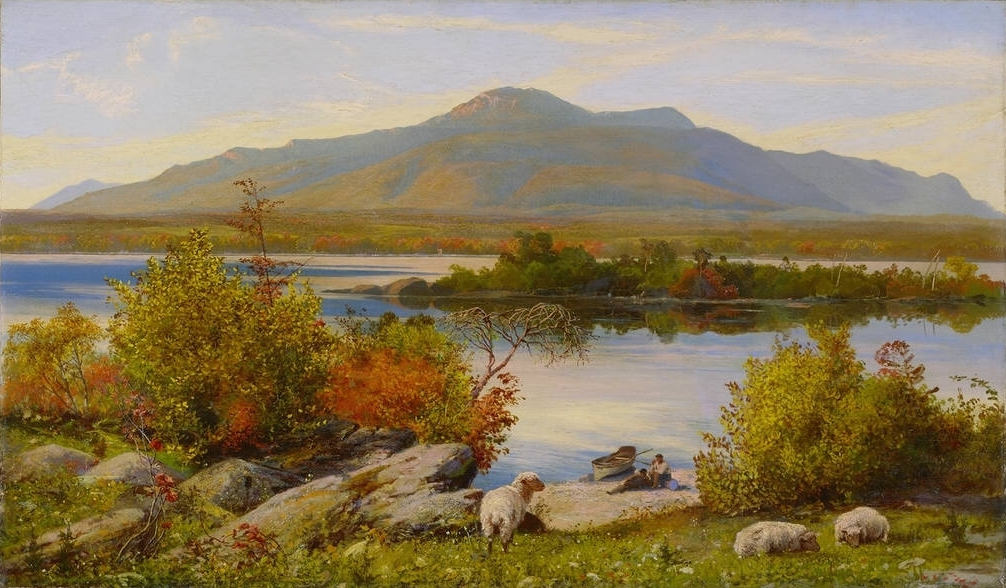
September Afternoon, Eastern Townships (1873)

Fraser left Notman's firm in Montreal in October 1868 and in November 1868 opened the partnership of Notman and Fraser in Toronto. In Toronto, Fraser employed young painters such as Horatio Walker, Homer Watson and Frederick Arthur Verner to provide high-quality artistic work. In 1876 Notman and Edward Wilson formed the Centennial Photographic Company, which obtained a monopoly on photography at the 1876 Centennial Exposition in Philadelphia. Fraser was employed as art supervisor by the company, which had 100 employees working in a large building on the exhibition grounds.

Fraser was the driving force in creating the Ontario Society of Artists (OSA). On 25 June 1872 he arranged a meeting at his home with six other artists who decided to form the OSA. The founders were Fraser, J. W. Bridgman, Robert Ford Gagen, James Hoch, Marmaduke Matthews, Charles Stuart Millard and Thomas Mower Martin. The honorary president was William Holmes Howland, and on 2 July 1872 Fraser was elected vice-president. The society held its first exhibition on 14 April 1873 at the Notman and Fraser premises, recently built for the firm. The press paid most attention to the work of Fraser, Lucius Richard O'Brien and Frederick Arthur Verner. Fraser was reelected vice-president of the OSA in 1873, but drew criticism for the way he dealt with the treasurer, who had embezzled funds. O'Brien replaced him in June 1874, and in December 1874 he resigned from the OSA.

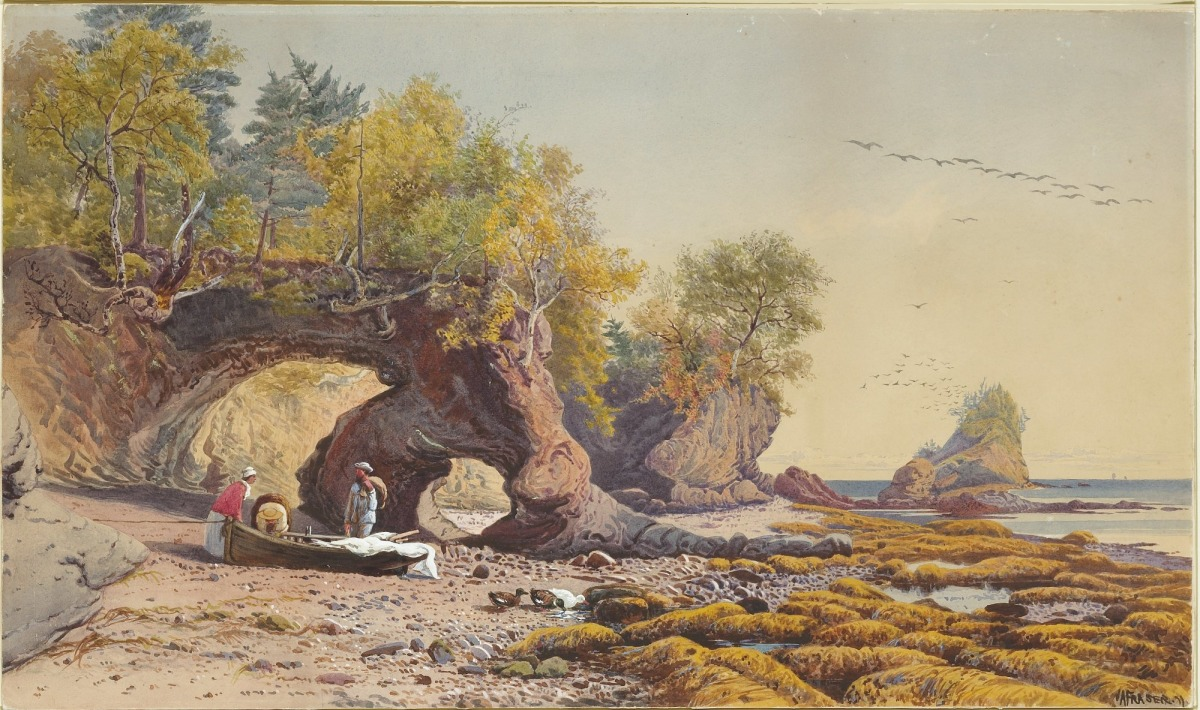
Coast Scene, Tide Out (1877) Inch Arran Point, Dalhousie, New Brunswick

In February 1877 Fraser again became a member of the OSA, and in summer of 1877 went by rail on a sketching trip to New Brunswick, where his work in the Restigouche River estuary, Bay of Chaleur (at present-day Dalhousie), and along the Gaspe coast of Quebec received interest and acclaim from locals, capturing breathtaking landscapes. In May 1878 he submitted a large number of oils and watercolors from his sketches to the OSA exhibition, where he received much praise for his work. That year he first exhibited his work with the American Watercolor Society. In October 1876 the Government of Ontario agreed to give the OSA a grant of $1,000 to open the first art school in Ontario at 14 King Street West in Toronto. Fraser was elected to the council of the Ontario School of Art in 1878, and in September that year became general supervisor of paintings at the school. His pupils included George Agnew Reid and Ernest Thompson Seton.

Fraser was a charter member of the Royal Canadian Academy of Arts in 1880. In the summer he returned to the east coast to make sketches for the Picturesque Canada project edited by George Monro Grant, but the publishers rejected his submissions. Fraser publicly accused them in October 1880 of using the work of non-Canadian artists. He also attacked the Picturesque Canada art editor, Lucius O’Brien, president of the Royal Canadian Academy of Arts. Fraser was often involved in bitter arguments with other artists. In the summer of 1883 Fraser was employed by a Chicago publisher to make a 2-week trip to northern Wisconsin to make sketches that illustrated an article that he wrote about his expedition. The Notman and Fraser partnership was wound up in 1883 and in June 1884 Fraser and Sons was launched as a photographic firm in Toronto.

William Cornelius Van Horne of the Canadian Pacific Railway (CPR) was an art connoisseur, and gave commissions to professional artists including Fraser and Lucius Richard O'Brien to make paintings of the Rockies for exhibitions promoting the CPR. In 1883 Fraser made a trip on the newly-completed CPR line to Calgary, and after his return sold paintings from the trip to Van Horne and Richard B. Angus of the CPR. In November 1884 Van Horne invited Fraser to illustrate a proposed guidebook for the CPR. After some delay, Fraser accepted the commission in October 1885. Van Horne was demanding, and felt free to give Fraser criticism and advice. For example, he said of a sketch of Mount Stephen that it "will hardly answer our purpose, the mountain not being sufficiently imposing...". Fraser was willing to accept this advice, and maintained a good relationship with Van Horne.

=== Last years (1885–1898) ===
Early in 1885 Fraser moved to Boston to join his wife and daughters, leaving his sons to run the photographic business. He became a member of the Boston Art Club and was one of the founders of the Boston Water Color Society. He found steady work making illustrations for New York magazines such as Century Illustrated Monthly Magazine. Fraser and Sons and all its assets was sold by March 1886.

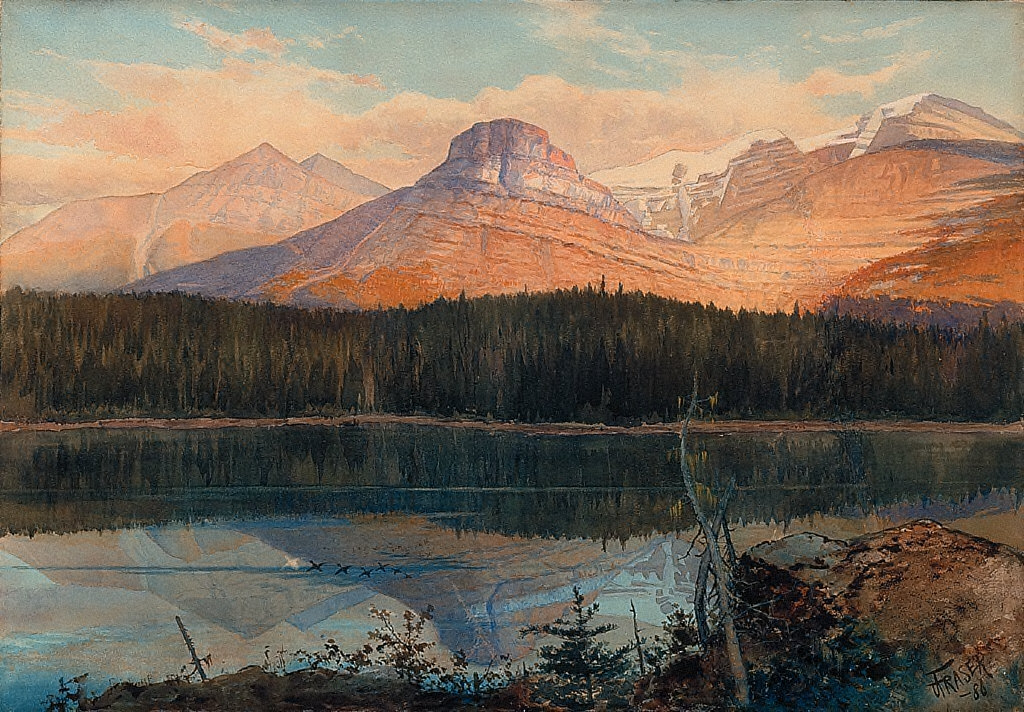
Summit Lake near Lenchoile, Bow River, Canadian Pacific Railway. (1886) Possibly Paget Peak and Sherbrooke Lake in British Columbia

Early in 1886 Van Horne gave Fraser a commission to paint three large watercolours from photographs of the Rocky Mountains. They were to be included with other paintings by Fraser in the display of Canadian art in London at the Colonial and Indian Exhibition. The critics were more interested in the work of younger Canadian figure painters, but the report on the exhibition by the librarian of the Royal Academy of Arts gave Fraser's Rocky Mountain watercolours high praise for their uniquely Canadian qualities. In June 1886 Fraser was sent on a sketching trip along the CPR line from Montreal to Vancouver Island and back. He arrived back in Toronto on 19 October 1886 with many watercolours, including sketches and larger more complete pictures. By the end of November he was back in Boston with his family. The CPR helped Fraser with an exhibition of his CPR pictures at the Canadian Club in New York in March 1887, and with a dealer in London in May 1887.

In the spring on 1888 Fraser returned to Britain, visited Scotland and Kent, then worked on his pictures in London until his health failed in the summer of 1889. The Royal Academy of Arts accepted one of his Scottish watercolours for their 1889 exhibition. Fraser and his wife then settled in New York City, and in 1890 he began to exhibit at the Society of American Artists, the New York Watercolor Club and the National Academy of Design. He mostly showed his British watercolours but included a few American subjects. He also exhibited in Boston and Canada, and in 1891 at the Paris Salon. He was on the board of the New York Watercolor Club in 1893–94, and of the American Watercolor Society in 1894–95. Some of his work was auctioned in Toronto in October 1897. Fraser died in New York City on 1 January 1898.

== Work ==
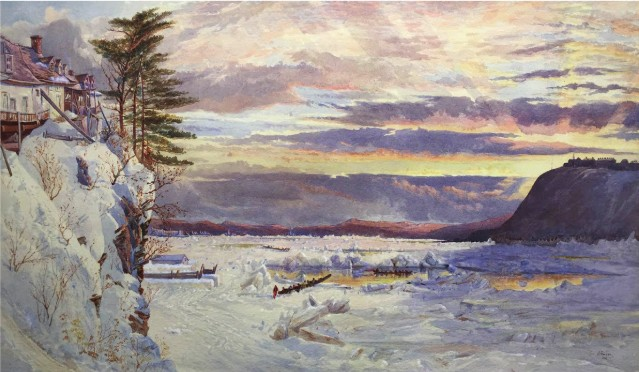
La Traversée de la glace de la Pointe de Lévy à Québec (1866)

Fraser's early work as a tinter of small head and shoulders studies for Notman is skillful and sensitive, giving the impression of miniature paintings. One his first known landscapes was the picturesque and romantic Crossing the ice at Pointe de Lévy in Quebec City (1866), which showed that he was already an accomplished artist. It has a dramatic sky and lighting, and meticulous detail in the foreground. Two of his oils from 1873, September afternoon, Eastern Townships and A shot in the dawn, Lake Scugog resemble the work of the Pre-Raphaelite painters popular in Britain at the time. They have strong and original composition and colour, with photographic clarity and detail. His 1878 New Brunswick landscapes are larger and more original both in composition and in use of colour than his earlier landscape. Most of Fraser's paintings were watercolours. His work was praised for its photographic realism, attention to detail and mastery of colour and light.

Relatively few of Fraser's paintings have survived. Some are held by the National Gallery of Canada (Ottawa), and smaller collections are held by the Beaverbrook Art Gallery (Fredericton), Montreal Museum of Fine Arts, Art Gallery of Hamilton (Hamilton, Ontario), Art Gallery of Ontario, Toronto Reference Library, Museum London (London, Ontario) and the Glenbow Museum (Calgary).

== Publications ==
- John Arthur Fraser (1884), "A scamper in the Nor'-west", Outing and the Wheelman (5): 83–90
- John Arthur Fraser (1887), "An artist's experiences in the Canadian Rockies", Canadian Leaves: 233–246

== Sources ==
- English, John (2011), Canada's Entrepreneurs: From the Fur Trade to the 1929 Stock Market Crash : Portraits from the Dictionary of Canadian Biography Under the Direction of John English and Réal Bélanger, University of Toronto Press, ISBN 978-1-4426-4478-6
- "John Arthur Fraser", The Canadian Encyclopedia, Historica Canada
- Klinkhoff, Alan; Klinkhoff, Craig; Potter-Bienvenu, Karen (28 March 2015), 2014 Year In Review: Galerie Alan Klinkhoff, Galerie Alan Klinkhoff, GGKEY:PJUNDQ108XQ
- Knowles, Valerie (1 March 2004), From Telegrapher to Titan: The Life of William C. Van Horne, Dundurn, ISBN 978-1-4597-1460-1
- Lerner, Loren (2012), "William Notman's "Photographic Selections" (1863)", Journal of Canadian Art History, 33 (1): 16–45, JSTOR 42616579
- Murray, Joan (1972), Ontario Society of Artists: 100 Years, 1872-1972 (From the AGO catalogue), AGO: Art Gallery of Ontario, archived from the original on 2 October 2013
- Reid, Dennis (1990), "FRASER, JOHN ARTHUR", in Francess G. Halpenny (ed.), Dictionary of Canadian Biography, Springer Science & Business Media, ISBN 978-0-8020-3460-1
- Ruggles, Mervyn (Spring 1985), "Paintings on a Photographic Base", Journal of the American Institute for Conservation, 24 (2): 92–103, doi:10.2307/3179450, JSTOR 3179450
- Wallace, W. Stewart, ed. (1948), "John Arthur Fraser", The Encyclopedia of Canada, vol. II, Toronto: University Associates of Canada
