= Henry Sandham =

Canadian artist (1842–1910)

Henry Sandham RCA
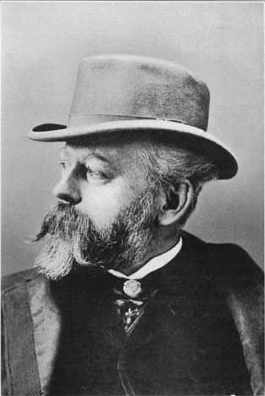
- Sandham in 1883
- Born: 24 May 1842; Montreal, Province of Canada
- Died: 21 June 1910 (aged 68); London, England
- Known for: Painter, illustrator
- Spouse: Agnes Fraser (m. 1865)

Henry Sandham RCA (24 May 1842 – 21 June 1910) was a Canadian painter and illustrator. He was the brother of author and numismatist Alfred Sandham.

== Biography ==
Born in Montreal, Sandham decided at an early age to pursue an artistic career, and was employed in William Notman's photographic studio from 1864 when he was 14 years old. By 18, he was an assistant to Notman's partner John Arthur Fraser, who managed the studio's art department. As there was no art school in Montreal at the time, Sandham learned his craft from Fraser, as well as local artists Otto Reinhold Jacobi, Adolphe Vogt, and C. J. Way. When Fraser left Montreal in 1868 to open a Toronto branch of Notman and Fraser, Sandham became the new head of the art department. He became partners with Notman in 1877 and the studio was renamed Sandham & Notman from 1877 to 1882.

The Notman studio was renowned for its composite photographs, consisting of carefully posed photographs of individuals mounted on painted backgrounds, a technique devised by Sandham. One particularly challenging composite, consisting of more than 300 separate people, won an award at the 1878 Exposition Universelle in Paris.

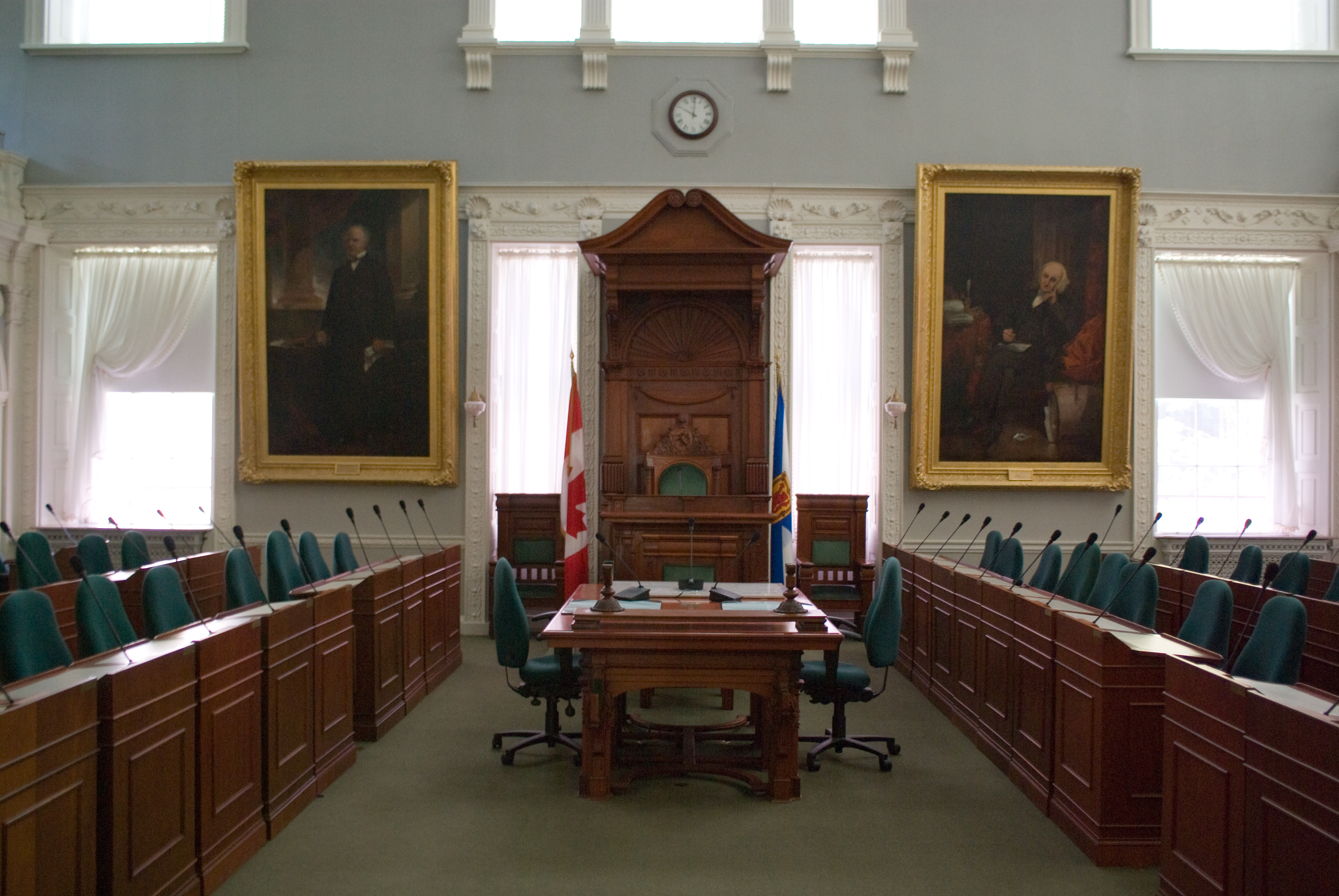
House of Assembly, Province House, Joseph Howe (left) and James William Johnston (right), both paintings by Henry Sandham

In 1877, he began doing illustrations for Scribner's Monthly, with his first piece accompanying an article by William George Beers. He then followed up with his own article in November 1878, and illustrations for a four-part series by George Monro Grant in 1880. All of these efforts led him to be named a charter member of the Royal Canadian Academy of Arts, founded in 1880.

In 1865, Sandham had married Agnes Fraser, the sister of his mentor. In early 1880, Sandham and his wife toured England and France. In December, they were visiting Boston, Massachusetts, intending only stay for a short while to complete some portrait commissions, but instead they ended up staying there for nearly twenty years. It was at this time when he decided to focus more on art and less on business. In 1882, The Century Magazine (the successor to Scribner's) sent him on assignment with Helen Hunt Jackson to Southern California to investigate the lives of Mission Indians. That work was published in 1883 and eventually formed the basis of her 1884 best-selling novel Ramona, for which Sandham also supplied illustrations (in a 1900 edition). Besides his illustrations, he was also known for portraits, including one of Canadian Prime Minister John A. Macdonald, and his historic paintings. During his period in Boston, his works were regularly shown at the Boston Art Club and the American Watercolor Society of New York, and he exhibited at Hermann Wunderlich's New York gallery in 1888 as well as the World's Columbian Exposition (1893), Cotton States and International Exposition (1895), and Tennessee Centennial and International Exposition (1897). His mural of the Battle of Lexington, The Birth of Liberty, appeared on two United States postage stamps issued to commemorate the event, one in 1925 and another in 1975.

Sandham moved to London in 1901, and continued his career there, with works shown at the Royal Academy of Arts from 1905 to 1908. His wife died in 1906, and he died in 1910. He is buried in Kensal Green Cemetery.

== Gallery ==
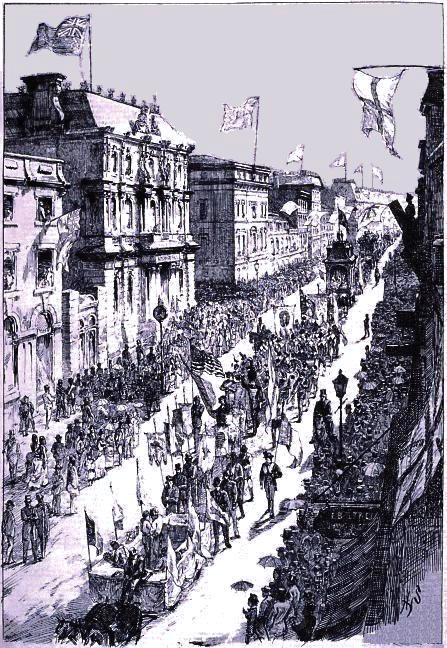
The Grand National Parade of June 24–25, 1874, ink on paper (1874)

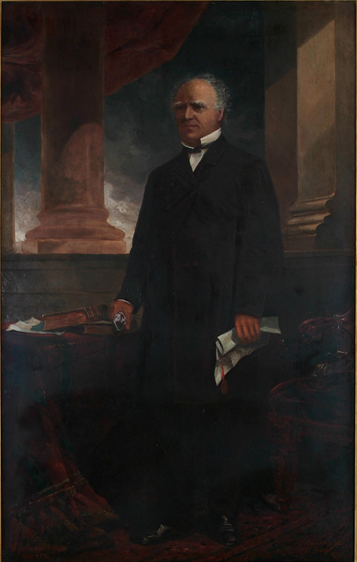
Joseph Howe (1875)

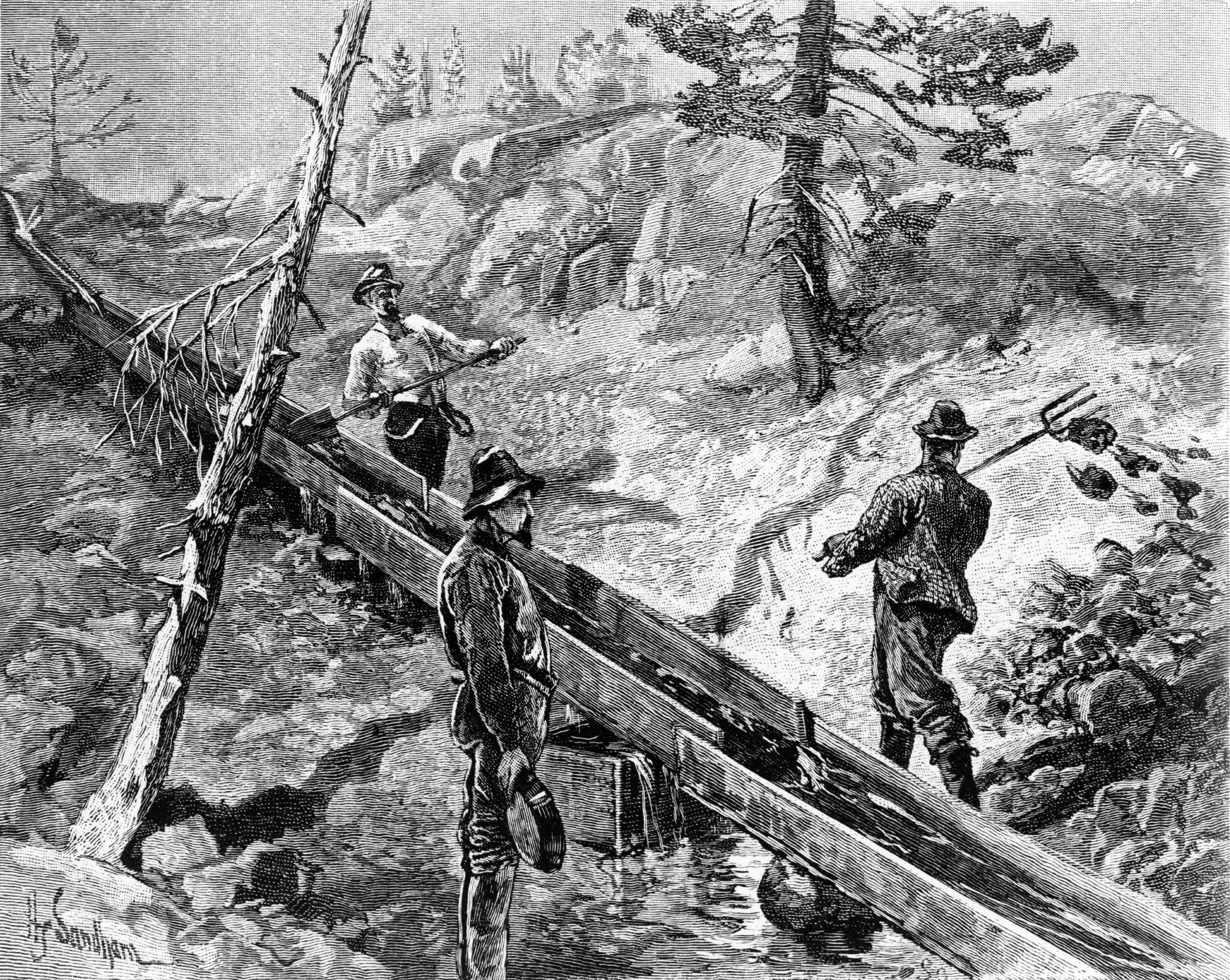
The Sluice, ink on paper (1886)

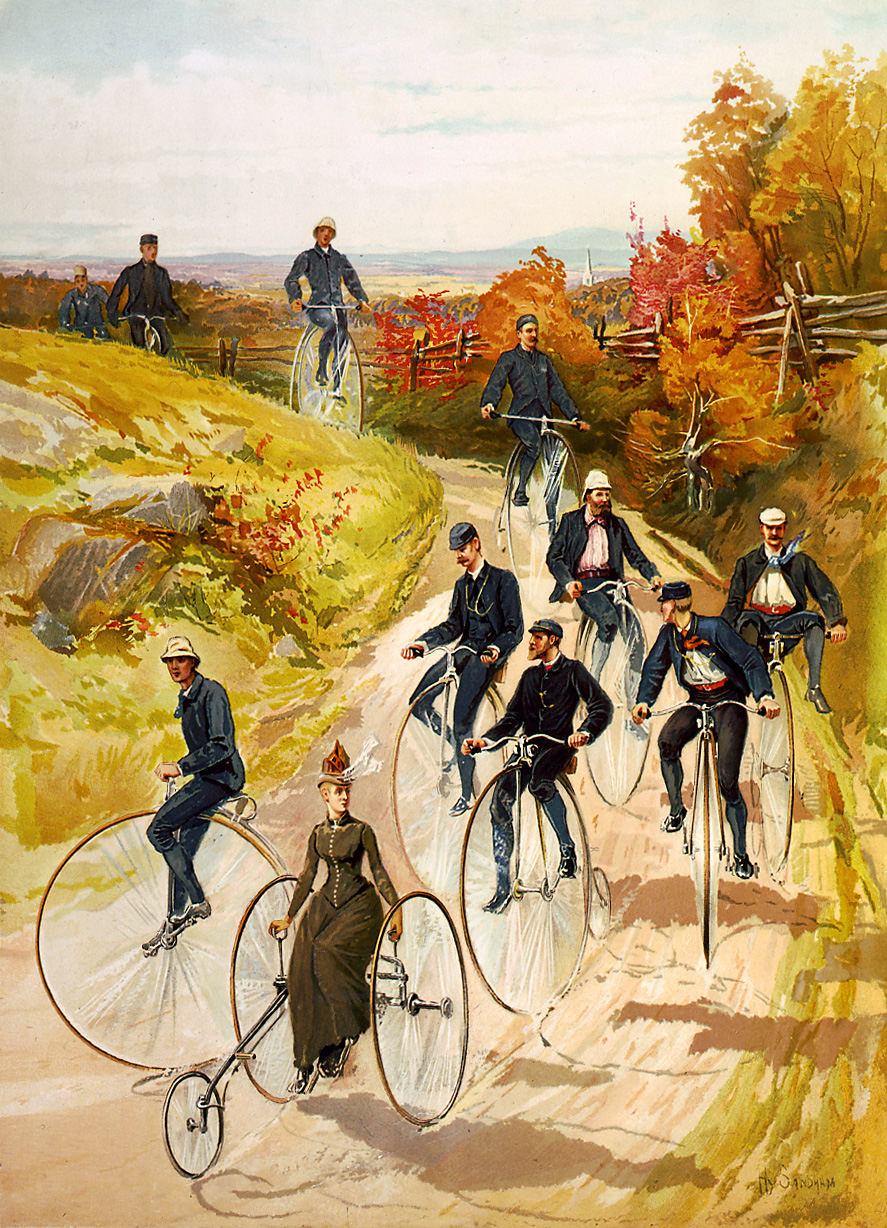
Bicycling, watercolour (1887)

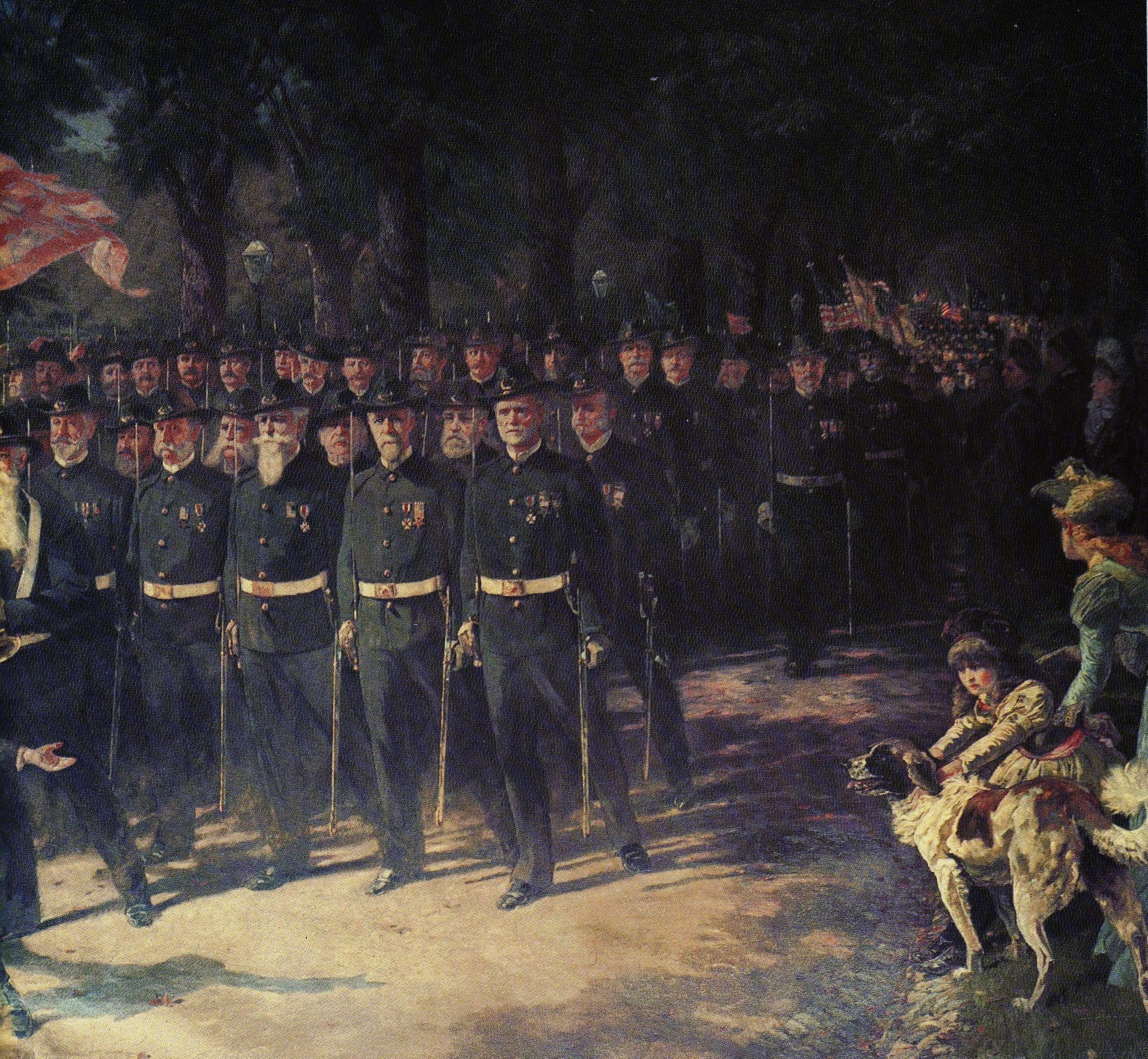
The March of Time, oil on canvas (1896)

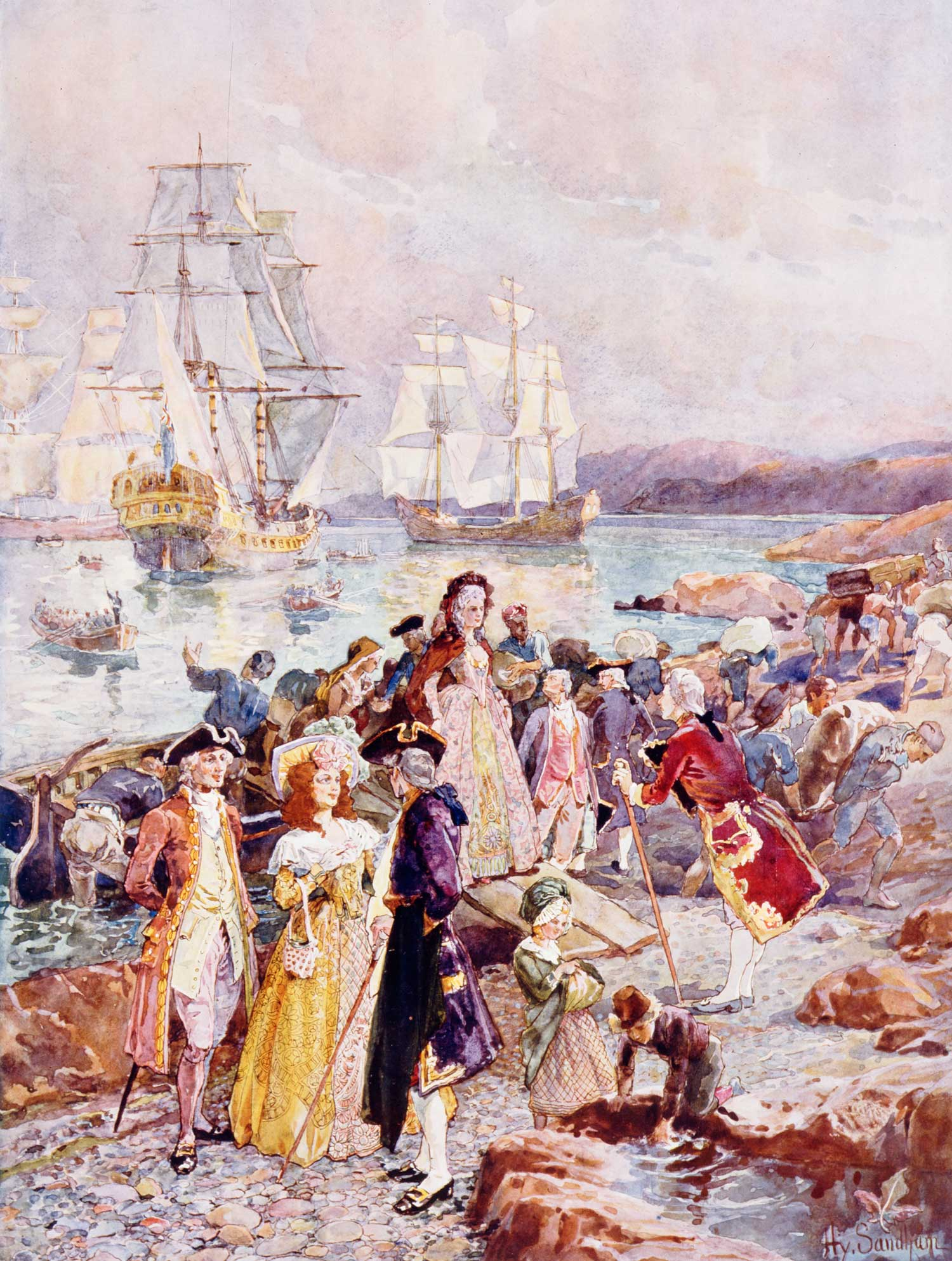
The Coming of the Loyalists, a romanticized view of the Loyalists' arrival in New Brunswick

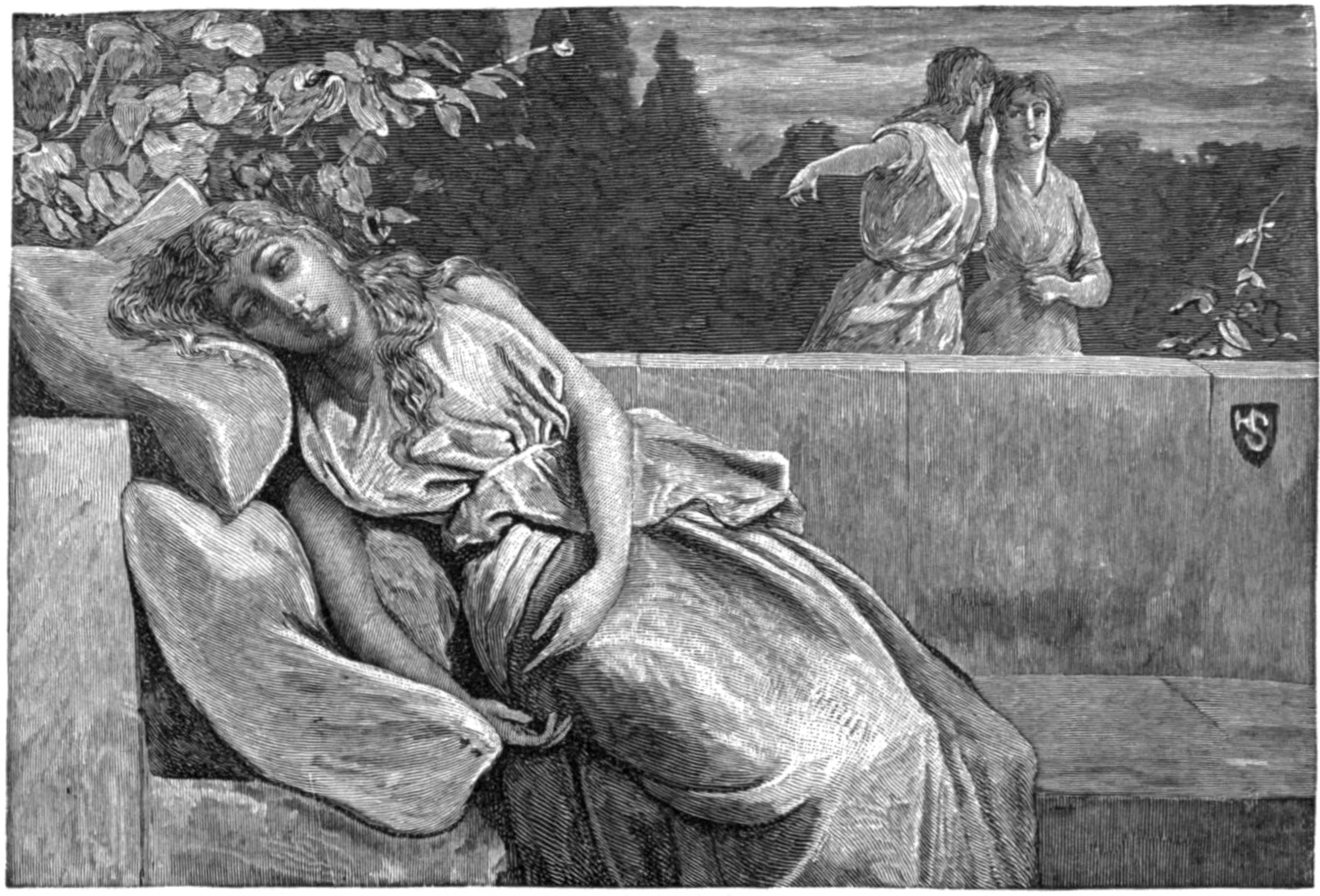
one of the illustrations for an edition of Poe's Lenore

== Record sale prices ==
At the Cowley Abbott Auction, Important Canadian Art (Sale 2), December 1, 2022, Lot #111, Catching Waterlilies (1889), oil on canvas, 24 x 34.5 ins (61 x 87.6 cms ), Auction Estimate: $50,000.00 – $60,000.00, realized a price of $156,000.00.

At the Cowley Abbott Auction, Artwork from an Important Private Collection - Part II, June 8, 2023, Low Tide, Murray Bay, oil on canvas (1884), 20 x 34 ins ( 50.8 x 86.4 cms ), Auction Estimate: $60,000.00 - $75,000.00, realized a price of $192,000.00.

== Associations ==
- Art Association of Montreal
- Boston Art Club
- Boston Society of Watercolor Painters
- Copley Society
- Ontario Society of Artists
- Paint and Clay Club
- Royal Canadian Academy of Arts
- Society of Canadian Artists
