= Royal Collection Project =

Canadian watercolors in King Charles III's collection

The Royal Collection Project is a body of one hundred contemporary Canadian watercolours housed within The Royal Collection of His Majesty King Charles III.

They comprise the single largest Canadian component within The Royal Collection, and were compiled in three phases by the Canadian Society of Painters in Water Colour (CSPWC/SCPA) to mark the societyʼs sixtieth, seventy-fifth and one hundredth anniversaries which were celebrated in 1985, 2000 and 2025, respectively.

Along with most of the Royal Collectionʼs works on paper they reside in the Royal Library at Windsor Castle.

== History ==
The initial sixty piece collection was formed in 1985 as part of the Diamond Anniversary celebrations of the CSPWC. Each watercolour in the collection was created by a different elected member of the society. The paintings were unveiled 5 December 1985 in an exhibition at the MacDonald Gallery (now the John B. Aird Gallery) in the Ontario Legislative Building(s) They were later shown at Ontario House, King Charles Place, London, U.K. (13 March - 24 April 1986) where an official reception and handover to the Royal Collection took place on 12 March 1986. A second display of the collection at Ontario House took place in 1988.

The paintings are housed in the Print Room of the Royal Library. They form part of the Royal Collection of Drawings and Watercolours. A selection was on public display in the castle throughout 1986 and 1987. Since their 1986 arrival at Windsor Castle, the paintings have been referred to as "The Canadian Gift".

In 2000 as part of the CSPWCʼs seventy-fifth anniversary celebrations a competition was held among newly elected members not represented in the original sixty piece collection to select fifteen additional works to add to the Windsor Castle holdings. This brought the group up to the symbolic total of seventy-five.

The selected works were then exhibited at Toronto's O'Connor Gallery and later at The Arts and Letters Club of Toronto, site of the 1925 founding of the society.

His Majesty King Charles III, an Honorary Member of the society, accepted the works at a reception hosted by both the CSPWC and Jeremy Kinsman the High Commission(er) of Canada to the United Kingdom.

== Initial concept and final execution ==
As the 1985 diamond (sixtieth) anniversary of the Canadian Society of Painters in Water Colour approached, the societyʼs executive decided to launch a series of commemorative events that would highlight the history and achievements of the organization. One suggestion was that a collection of watercolours by society members be compiled and placed with a major national cultural body. It was thought that a collection of sixty works selected by jury would be appropriate. This idea met with strong support and the proposal was presented to a number of institutions, including Rideau Hall, The National Gallery of Canada, The Royal Ontario Museum, The Art Gallery of Ontario and several major university galleries.

The idea took on the name of the "Diamond Jubilee Collection" and it seemed to be a relatively straight forward project of identifying a host institution and then judging and collecting sixty works. Sensibly, as it turned out, the original concept had envisioned small paintings in case the society was asked to submit them in albums, portfolios or presentation cases.

In 1985 Sir Robin Mackworth-Young, the Royal Librarian and author of a book on the history of the Royal Collections was contacted by the CSPWC when the society learnt that there were few Canadian art works held in the Royal Collection. (Despite Canada being traditionally identified as the Senior Dominion within the Commonwealth several other countries such as India and Australia were far better represented.) The ensuing exchange of correspondence resulted in the CSPWC/SCPAʼs anniversary collection being accepted by the Royal Librarian, Oliver Everett, on behalf of Queen Elizabeth II with a formal hand-over of the actual work taking place at Ontario House, London, on 12 March 1986. This coincided with the first foreign exhibition of the paintings being hosted by the Government of Ontario.

A selection of the watercolours was later put on public display in Windsor Castle during 1986 and 1987 in Windsorʼs drawing gallery.

The CSPWC/SCPA was delighted with the outcome of the project as the Royal Collection has unrivaled conservation standards and an internationally acknowledged reputation for loaning works. The Canadian watercolours are accessible to scholars who apply to the Royal Library.

In 2000 as part of the CSPWC/SCPAʼs seventy-fifth anniversary a competition was held among elected members not represented in the original sixty piece collection to select fifteen additional paintings to add to the Windsor Castle holdings. This brought the donated collection up to a symbolic seventy-five works.

The selected fifteen works were first unveiled by Hilary Weston, Lieutenant Governor of Ontario, at Torontoʼs historic Arts and Letters Club in November 2000. The watercolours were transported to the United Kingdom and exhibited by the Canadian Government at Canada House in Trafalgar Square throughout December 2001 with a formal presentation to The Prince of Wales taking place on 11 December. This event was hosted by the CSPWC/SCPA and the Canadian High Commissioner Jeremy Kinsman.

A third and final competition and selection took place in the months leading up to the societyʼs centennial in 2025. A body of twenty five watercolours by artists unrepresented in the previous collections were selected, exhibited and donated to the Royal Collection in 2026.

The entire Royal Collection is, as of 2011, being photographed and each item given an individual inventory number. Within a few years scholars and researchers accessing the Royal Collection site will be able to access images and data by using the corresponding RCIN number.

== Phase 1, the 1985 Collection ==
A general call for entry went out to all elected members of the CSPWC early in 1984 and a selection took place in the summer of 1985. The artists and works selected were:

Artists	Title of work	Royal Collection Inventory No.
Herbert J. Ariss	"Nude study, 1985"	RCIN 926161
E. Conyers Barker	"Overlooking Cookeʼs Bay, Lake Simcoe, Ontario"	RCIN 926162
Anthony J. Batten	"Day of rest, Bay St Lawrence, Nova Scotia"	RCIN 926163
John A. E. Bennett	"Stonehenge"	RCIN 926164
Sam Black	"Old Pals"	RCIN 926165
Harriet Manore Carter	"Strange Bed Fellows"	RCIN 926166
Ray Cattell	"Turn of the Wind Track"	RCIN 926167
Joanne Clarke	"Canadian Seasons 1"	RCIN 926168
Michael Cleary	"Muncho lake, British Columbia"	RCIN 926169
Elmer Dambergs	"The Local Royalty"	RCIN 926170
Anne Macintosh Duff	"Garages In Winter"	RCIN 926171
Anne Marsh Evans	"06:30 hrs, Wyoming, Ontario"	RCIN 926172
James Evans	"Moorings, New Haven, Cape Breton"	RCIN 926173
Pat Fairhead	"Winter Pines at Moonstone #1"	RCIN 926174
Philippa Faulkner	"The Public Gardens, Halifax, Nova Scotia"	RCIN 926175
Joan Fedoroshyn	"Thunderstorm #2, 1984"	RCIN 926176
Mark Fletcher	"Portrait of Three Captains, Newfoundland"	RCIN 926177
Peter Goetz	"Window at Doon Pioneer Village"	RCIN 926178
Barbara L. Greene	"Spring River, 1985"	RCIN 926179
Julius Griffith	"The Empty Farmhouse, 1982"	RCIN 926180
B. Cogill Haworth	"Beaching Gear of the Stranraer War Plane, Esquimalt, B.C., 1943"	RCIN 926181
Peter Haworth	"The Forgotten, 1956"	RCIN 926182
Mel Heath	"Aberdeen School"	RCIN 926183
Barbara Roe Hicklin	"Canadaʼs Yukon, Whitehorse Airport"	RCIN 926184
Marjorie Hodgson	"Backyards, Alcorn Avenue, Toronto"	RCIN 926185
Jane Hunter	"Lichen Series #6"	RCIN 926186
Herzl Kashetsky	"Made in England"	RCIN 926187
Cynthia Kemerer	"On The Edge	RCIN 926188
Jean Klaassen	"Flowering Kale"	RCIN 926189
Brent Laycock	"Morning Light On The Rockies"	RCIN 926190
Lilian Laponen-Stephenson	"Plan To Evade Capture"	RCIN 926191
Mary Anne Ludlam	"$1.39 A Pound"	RCIN 926192
D. Helen Mackie	"Tipi Centre 1"	RCIN 926193
Doris McCarthy	"Sheds And Shore Junk, Lake Harbour, Baffin Island"	RCIN 926194
Janet Mitchell	"Whatʼs A Farm Doing So Close To Town?"	RCIN 926195
M. Greene Mitchell	"Chinese Supper, 1985"	RCIN 926196
June Montgomery	"Bear Mother And Child. (Frontlet with abalone decoration)"	RCIN 926197
Donald Neddeau	"Barachois Gaspesie, Quebec"	RCIN 926198
Tibor Nyilasi	"Rainy Day"	RCIN 926199
Will Ogilvy	"Winter Evening"	RCIN 926200
Robert Percival	"Plants In Window"	RCIN 926201
Marjorie Pigott	"How Simple Is Beauty"	RCIN 926202
Gery Puley	"Early Winter, Crawford Lake"	RCIN 926203
Ethel Raicus	"Ionic Scape"	RCIN 926204
Jack Reid	"The Red Boat"	RCIN 926205
Hugh Robertson	"Clouds Over The Gaspe Hills, Province Du Quebec"	RCIN 926206
Adeline Rockett	"Winter, A Country Road"	RCIN 926207
Laurine Sage	"Metamorphosis In Orange And Blue"	RCIN 926208
Marlis Saunders	"Ice Patterns #14"	RCIN 926209
William Sherman	"Home, Colourful Home"	RCIN 926210
Robert Sinclair	"Break"	RCIN 926211
Margaret L. Squire	"Evening Waters, Lake Huron"	RCIN 926212
Stephanie Quainton Steel	"Light In The Inlet, Brentwood, Vancouver Island, B.C."	RCIN 926213
Bonnie Steinman	"A Small Still-Life"	RCIN 926214
Rudolph Stussi	"Looking In"	RCIN 926215
Osvald Timmas	"Simcoeside Track"	RCIN 926216
Brian Travers-Smith	"A Taste Of Salt"	RCIN 926217
John S. Walsh	"Chapel Of Notre Dame De Bon Secours, Montreal"	RCIN 926218
Ivan T. Wheale	"Pool Rocks, Key River"	RCIN 926219
Ruth Yamada	"Christmas Cactus"	RCIN 926220

== Phase 2, the 2000 Collection ==
Following the procedures used in the initial selection process a call for entries went out to all eligible members early in the 2000 anniversary year. A significant number of entries were presented for the judging which took place in Trinity College Chapel, University of Toronto. The artists and works selected for the second phase were:

Artists	Title of work	Royal Collection Inventory No.
Barbara Augustine	"Bill"	RCIN 933762
Bonnie Brooks	"Suspension"	RCIN 933763
Pat Clemes	"Delphiniums"	RCIN 933764
Diana Dabinett	"Icebergs Off Newfoundland"	RCIN 933765
Ron Hazell	"A Canadian Moment"	RCIN 933766
Wendy Hoffmann	"The Red Canoe"	RCIN 933767
E. Jane Hunter	"Sunset And City Lights, Toronto"	RCIN 933768
Elizabeth Jaworski	"Mondays"	RCIN 933769
Linda Kemp	"Niagara Landscape"	RCIN 933770
Ross Monk	“Sunrise Reflections”	RCIN 933771
Jean Pederson	"Mercy"	RCIN 933772
Alice Reed	"Misty Morning"	RCIN 933773
Ruth Sawatzky	"Heirlooms Remembered"	RCIN 933774
Vivian Thierfelder	"Cobalt Blue"	RCIN 933775
Tom Young	"Standing Tall, Otter Lake"	RCIN 933776

== Phase 3, the 2025 Collection ==
The final selection of twenty-five paintings marks the culmination of the Canadian Society of Painters in Water Colour's extraordinary 40-year special project, placing 100 watercolours into the prestigious Royal Collection Trust at Windsor Castle. The paintings were selected by a panel of 12 CSPWC members and special jurors Martin Clayton, Head of Prints and Drawings - Royal Collection Trust and Alice de Quidt, Assistant Curator - Royal Collection Trust and Robert Rash (in honour of the late Anthony Batten 2020).

The artists and works selected were:

Artists	Title of work	Royal Collection Inventory No.
Missy Acker	"Wild Anthem"	
Harold Allanson	"A Moment To Reflect"	
Jennifer Annesley	"Timepiece"	
Brian Atyeo	"Evening - Killarney Bay"	
Ann Balch	"Alone"	
Poppy Balser	"Sails Gleam Against Sky and Water"	
Liane Bedard	"To Soft Slumber"	
Shari Blaukopf	"October Corn"	
David Cadman	"Wells Gray Park"	
Nadine Cole	"The Butterfly Stone"	
Sterling Edwards	"Entwined"	
Elizabeth Gilbert	"Water's Colours - Elements Dance in Time"	
Wenqing He	"In The Cabbage Fields"	
Marlene Madole	"Shadowscape II, Grapes"	
Virginia May	"Gooderham Flatiron Building from the Market"	
David McEown	"Polar Bear n.8"	
Susan Patterson	"Silver Tea Cup and Lemon"	
William Rogers	"Out of the Dust"	
Mark Rosser	"Hunter's Moon, Nocturne in Blue"	
Edward Shawcross	"The Star Juggler"	
Bhupinder Singh	"Fillmore after Rain"	
Bonnie Steinberg	"Waiting For Spring"	
Zhou Tianya	"Fisherman at Peggy's Cove"	
Brittney Tough	"Royal HBC"	
Rayne Tunley	"Ancient Currents"	
