= Robert Ford Gagen =

Canadian artist (1847–1926)

Robert F. Gagen
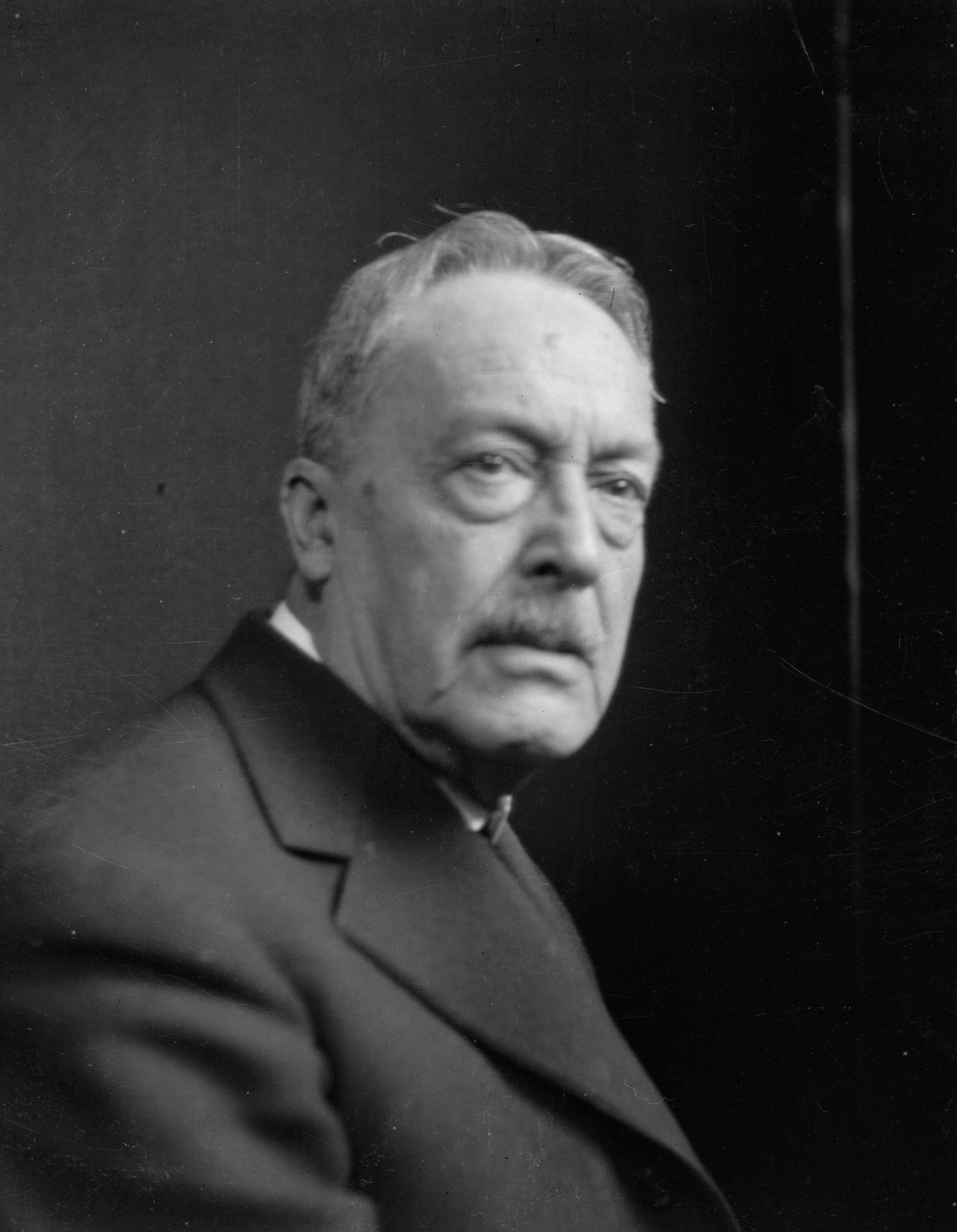
- R. F. Gagen
- Born: Robert Ford Gagen; May 10, 1847; London, England
- Died: March 2, 1926 (aged 78); Toronto, Ontario
- Spouse: Jane Palmer (married 1873)

Robert Ford Gagen RCA, also known as R. F. Gagen and as Robert F. Gagen, (May 10, 1847 – March 02, 1926) was a Canadian painter of seascapes and landscapes. He was said by the editor of The Canadian Forum to be an art pioneer in Ontario and an institution in the Ontario Society of Artists.

== Biography ==
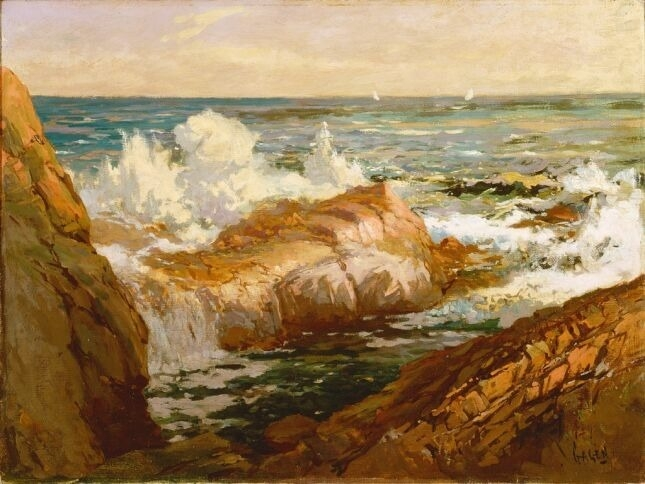
Late Afternoon (1923), National Gallery of Canada

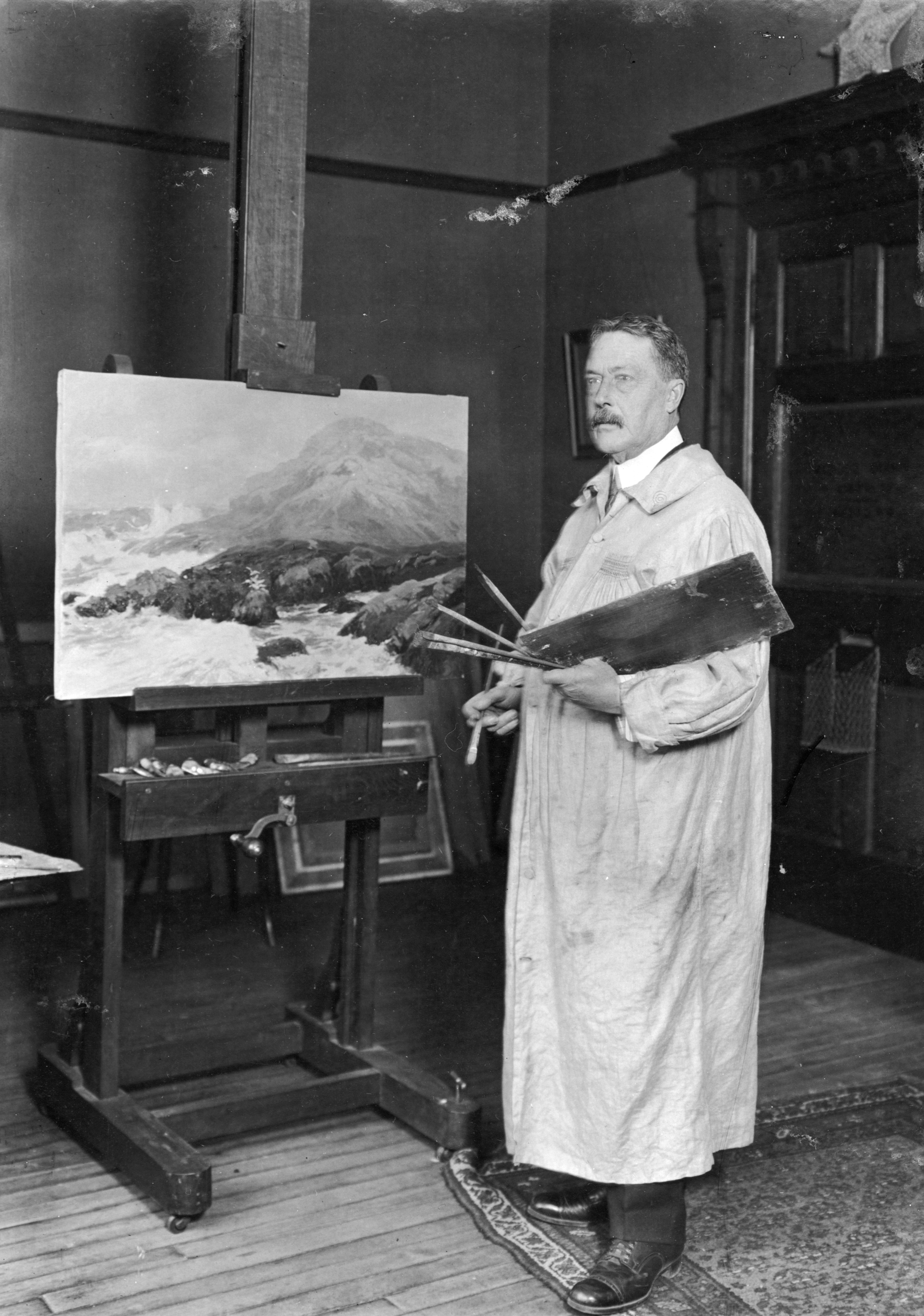
Robert Ford Gagen in his studio, [ca. 1900]

Robert Ford Gagen was born in London, England. He came to Canada with his parents in 1862, and settled at Harpurhey, now Seaforth, in Huron County, Ontario. William Nicoll Cresswell, an artist who lived near Seaforth, began to teach him drawing and painting in 1863. Afterwards, Gagen went to Toronto and entered a painting class with George Gilbert. In 1872, John Arthur Fraser hired Gagen to work at Notman and Fraser as a painter of water colour portraits and miniatures on a photographic base: he remained there till 1878.

Gagen painted sea and river studies and travelled widely to do so, favouring the Maritime Provinces and the shore of the St. Lawrence River in Quebec as well as Maine and Massachusetts in the United States. In 1890, he painted the Rockies and the Selkirks and in 1906, Scotland and Switzerland. In 1910, he returned to painting the St. Lawrence.

In 1918, the Canadian War Memorials Fund asked him to record the shipbuilding underway in Toronto, Ontario. He exhibited his work in the many societies of which he was a member almost every year from the time he joined them. In 1927, a year after he died, there was an exhibition and sale of his work at Eaton's.

His work is included today in exhibitions of Canadian art, such as Stone and Sky: Canada's Mountain Landscape, at the Audain Art Museum in Whistler, British Columbia in 2018 and is in many collections such as the National Gallery of Canada and Art Gallery of Ontario.

== Honours and distinctions ==
Gagen was one of the founders of the Ontario Society of Artists in 1872. He became the Society's long-term secretary (1889–1926). He was elected an Associate of the Royal Canadian Academy in 1880, and became a full member in 1915. In 1893, he was appointed one of the Canadian Fine Arts Commissioners to the World's Columbian Exposition, Chicago. He acted in the same capacity at the Pan-American Exposition, Buffalo, 1901, where he was awarded honorable mention and at the Louisiana Purchase Exposition, St. Louis, 1904. He was also Director of the Fine Arts Exhibitions for the Canadian National Exhibition, appointed from 1904 on, and Secretary of the Commission in 1912. He occupied both these posts till his death in 1926. He was a member of the Board of the Central Ontario School of Art and Design, and later a member of the council of the OCAD|Ontario College of Art. He helped found the Canadian Society of Painters in Water Colour in 1926 and served as President (1925–1926), and was a charter member of the Arts and Letters Club of Toronto, later serving as its president (1918–1920).

Gagen was the author of Ontario Art Chronicle, ca. 1919, a typed manuscript in the collection of The Edward P. Taylor Library & Archives of the Art Gallery of Ontario in Toronto.

Gagen died in Toronto on March 2, 1926. The Toronto Daily Star report of the funeral said, "The assemblage of so many painters, architects, writers, musicians, sculptors and university professors as well as associate members demonstrated how widespread was the influence of this remarkable old artist whose art and mentality had always kept the vigor of eternal youth."
