= Canadian Society of Painters in Water Colour =

Canadian arts organization

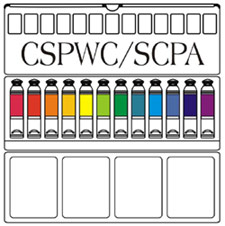
CSPWC logo

The Canadian Society of Painters in Water Colour (French: La Société Canadienne de Peintres en Aquarelle), founded in 1925, is considered to be Canada's official national watercolour Society. Since the 1980s the Society has enjoyed Vice-regal Patronage from the incumbent Governor General of Canada. Recognized by a long list of international exhibitions it is the Canadian equivalent of such other national societies as the American Watercolor Society of the United States, the Royal Watercolour Society of the United Kingdom, etc.

The nation's oldest medium-specific arts organization has had an illustrious history. Membership is looked upon as a mark of achieving peer recognition in one of the most difficult and demanding visual arts form.

The elected members are entitled to use the Society's initials CSPWC (in French: SCPA) after their names.

== Early history ==
There is probably justification for including some of the indigenous peoples as early users of versions of watercolour in their artwork and crafts. Using local materials and chemicals they certainly approximated the watercolour medium in some of their pigments and dyes while really not having any practical reason for exploring any inherent transparent qualities.

The first recorded use of a European trained watercolourist working within what is today Canadian territory is believed to be the works of John White who accompanied the expeditions of Sir Martin Frobisher in the 1570s. Another early example of a gifted watercolourist working in the same region would be Samuel de Champlain who first arrived in 1603. Historically art-trained officers or cartographers were dispatched by both the French and British governments to assist in the preparation of vitally important maps of these newly claimed lands and to record geographical features. There is a surviving wealth of early watercolours from this period which record landscape features and early settlements. Eagerly collected in today's art markets the best are notably housed in Library and Archives Canada, the National Gallery of Canada and the Royal Ontario Museum.

Prior to the invention of the camera, watercolour portrait miniatures, on vellum or ivory, were a staple in the homes of Canada's urban elite.

By the nineteenth century there were a number of well-known watercolourists such as Thomas Davies [1737–1812], George Heriot, Otto Reinhold Jacobi, C. J. Way and Canadian-born Lucius Richard O'Brien [1832–1899] working in various parts of the country. Kane became well known for his record of interactions with the First Nations People as he traveled across western Canada with The North West Company and the Hudson's Bay Company. While Jacobi, Way and O'Brien and others involved themselves in the 1880 founding of the Royal Canadian Academy of Arts there had long been demands, especially in Montreal, for the formation of a specifically medium based society.

While several of these early societies did survive for brief periods it was on November 11, 1925, that a group of like-minded artists met at the historic Arts & Letters Club of Toronto and founded the CSPWC/SCPA. Only when a working framework was proposed for membership under the honorary leadership of the noted painter R.F. Gagen did it seem possible that such a society could survive in the immense geographical reality that was Canada. Within a few years a set of bylaws had been established, a constitution approved and several Toronto-based exhibitions held. The first elected President was Frederick Henry (Fred) Brigden (1871–1951) a well-connected artist and educator who created a sense of vitality within the group and who encouraged many younger artists to apply for election.

The founding members of the CSPWC/SCPA were Brigden, A.J. Casson, Franklin Carmichael, C.W. Jefferys, Fred S. Haines, L. A. C. Panton, Robert Ford Gagen, Thomas Garland Greene, Robert Holmes, Frank Johnston, André Lapine, and J. Ernest Sampson.

When organizing the initial meeting these mainly Ontario-based artists did invite a number of nationally prominent watercolourists including W.J. Phillips and Florence Helena McGillivray who, being based at distances from Toronto, were unable to attend. However they did send strong letters of support and in reality should be considered "founders". This is significant because the inclusion of Florence H. McGillivray is evidence of the new society's willingness to accept female members from its inception.

== Formative years ==
The CSPWC/SCPA, attracting attention in its infancy, was soon having its exhibitions hung at the Art Gallery of Toronto (now the Art Gallery of Ontario) and the National Gallery of Canada. This emphasis on exhibitions was crucial at the time as there were virtually no commercial galleries in the country. The only way an individual artist could make a living was by exhibiting with such societies as the Canadian Society of Painters in Water Colour, the Ontario Society of Artists, and the Royal Canadian Academy of Arts, in a public gallery. The reality was that the emerging artist got public recognition by jury acceptance to exhibit with his or her better-known peer group, their fame adding lustre by association.

In the years between the World War I and World War II, Canada experienced a period of unexpected growth as demand for its agricultural products and mineral wealth made it one of the world's strongest markets. As one of the signatories of the Treaty of Versailles in 1919, Canada was, unknown to itself at the time, seeking to establish its own identity separate from its earlier colonial rulers.

The 1939 New York World's Fair catalogue cover.

It was in the visual arts, initially in the area of landscape painting, that the new country found one of its strongest senses of self. As painters across the country fanned out into their respective rural, backwoods and northern spaces, it was the medium of watercolour an easily transportable and light material which lent itself so readily to the newly popular subject matter.

While many artists did use watercolours as an on-site sketching medium, many used those same paintings as source material for often larger and more highly finished works on canvas that they produced in their home studios. The resulting public perception of watercolours as a lesser medium than others such as oil is a still recurrent problem for all practitioners despite the fact that watercolour is the more demanding medium. It was this very ill-informed perception that was behind the very founding of the Society as an exhibiting body where the individual art pieces would not be compared to neighbouring work in other less challenging materials.

Beginning in the 1930s, the National Gallery of Canada was instrumental in assisting the CSPWC/SCPA with a series of high-profile international exchange exhibitions with societies in New Zealand, Brazil, France, Great Britain and the US. In addition, the National Gallery from 1933 onward sponsored a regular series of juried shows that toured across Canada. The Federal Government invited the CSPWC/SCPA to exhibit in the Canadian Pavilion at the 1938 British Empire Exhibition and at the 1939 New York World's Fair. Both of these overseas exhibitions were praised by the international art press and served to increase the prestige of the Society.

With the outbreak of World War II a number of members were appointed official war artists and served in various capacities at home and on the war fronts. The regular series of exhibitions was obviously affected and only fully resumed in 1946.

== Times change ==
In 1949, the Society's annual exhibition at the Art Gallery of Toronto was reorganized to open up new rules to become the first truly "open", as opposed to "invitational", show in the Society's history. That tradition, with some amendments, has continued to the present day with the current "Open Water" Annual Exhibition being open internationally to any artist working in the medium.

The 1950s witnessed the creation of new areas of art scholarship with the development of both commercial art galleries and a new professional approach to art curatorships in the major public galleries. Finding that a sizable percentage of the exhibition program was taken up with the annual shows of regional and national arts groups, the new curatorial staff repositioned themselves. The last regular exhibition of the Society at the Art Gallery of Toronto was hosted in 1958 and subsequently there was a cooling of long treasured connections with Ottawa's National Gallery.

The leadership within the CSPWC/SCPA sought alternate gallery space and found it in a variety of venues from coast to coast. Regional galleries, libraries and university campuses hosted the annual exhibitions and a new sense of national identity was found within the Society. While the annual search for a venue created much work for a volunteer membership it did help develop a real sense of comradeship that has continued to the present day. While a number of other media-based institutions started to falter during this difficult period the CSPWC/SCPA worked very hard to keep itself viable and the annual juried show its "raison d'être". Working from within its own resources and relying on elected members in far-flung communities, the regular annual exhibitions continued to take place but the cost of shipping, cataloguing and insurance were prohibitive and much of the work was performed by a small set of volunteers. It all became very draining, and as new commercial galleries sprung up, many members left to forge more lucrative connections.

== Rebounding ==
The long history of annual juried exhibitions continued into the 1970s and with the addition of exchange exhibitions with the American Watercolor Society at the National Academy Galleries in New York City. In 1975, an invitation was accepted to exhibit at the newly renovated Canada House on Trafalgar Square in London. The same year the Art Gallery of Ontario hosted an "in-house" retrospective to salute the Society's 50th anniversary. In 1976 the Society was able to organize a member exchange exhibition with Japan that was exhibited at the Tokyo Metropolitan Art Museum. This particular show, with the cooperation of a number of government and commercial partners was a critical success. The acclaim received gave the CSPWC/SCPA members a renewed sense of identity.

Working with Visual Arts Ontario, the Society was able to obtain permanent office space in the 1970s and was able to organize the first of a number of educational seminars that have evolved into today's popular National Watercolour Symposiums. These week-long events have been held in virtually every part of the country and have been responsible for a major spurt in applications for membership.

When the time came to organize the CSPWC/SCPA 1985 Diamond Jubilee the Society found that the world of art had again gone through some major changes. First there was a burst of new interest in the whole field of painting in watercolour that was particularly evident in Canada and the United States. There was also a realization in the art community that while there were many advantages to be found in the commercial galleries there were still other opportunities that could only be found in the context of the traditional societies. This was strongly reinforced when Queen Elizabeth II accepted the 60 paintings that had been juried as the "CSPWC Diamond Jubilee Collection" (later known as the Royal Collection Project - CSPWC, phase 1) into the fabled Royal Collection at Windsor Castle and exhibited them in 1986 in the Castle's Drawing Gallery. Later the CSPWC/SCPA was deeply involved with a major touring exhibition "International Waters" that put Canadian paintings on exhibition with submissions from The Royal Watercolour Society, The American Watercolor Society, and The Royal Scottish Society of Painters in Watercolour in venues in four different countries.

In the 1980s the CSPWC/SCPA was one of a number of major arts organizations that set up the John B. Aird Gallery/Galerie John B. Aird within the Ontario Government administrative complex at Queen's Park, Toronto. The Aird Gallery, available to each of the societies for an annual exhibition, put the CSPWC/SCPA on a secure exhibition footing and yet still gave it the opportunity to seek exhibition opportunities across the nation. When their regular exhibition slot is not used for the Annual "Open Water" show it is devoted to member themed displays.

By the 1990s the CSPWC/SCPA had truly become a "national" society with a series of regional directors and members drawn from across the country. This continues today with the current outreach to involve greater participation from First Nation artists.

Celebrating the 75th anniversary in 2000 with its regular Annual "Open Water" exhibition, the CSPWC/SCPA unveiled the first Julius Griffith award given to "an elected member who has made an outstanding and sustained contribution to the Society". Once again adjudication of members' works took place in order to send another 15 paintings to be added to the 60 Canadian holdings at the Royal Library at Windsor Castle to become a part of the CSPWC's Royal Collection Project. Those selected were displayed at the Arts & Letters Club of Toronto and then at the Canadian High Commission in London where they were, in 2001, formally accepted by H.R.H. the Prince of Wales, now His Majesty King Charles III, who is an Honorary Member of the CSPWC/SCPA.

Continuing this distinguished legacy, the CSPWC’s Royal Collection Project was renewed in 2025–2026 as part of the Society’s centennial celebrations. Contemporary Canadian watercolours were once again selected to represent the strength and diversity of the medium in Canada, continuing a tradition of cultural exchange and preserving an evolving record of Canadian watercolour excellence within the Royal Collection at Windsor Castle.

There was also a members' exhibition in Toronto that marked the anniversary thereby continuing a long tradition. As the year came to a close, a major retrospective show of the Society, "A Brush with History", was organized by the Art Gallery of Mississauga.

== Present ==
The Annual "Open Water" show, open to all artists, continues to be the focus of the Society's work, which can be hosted anywhere in the country. The most prestigious award is the "A. J. Casson Award", a commissioned medal created by the distinguished Canadian sculptor Dora de Pédery-Hunt, given "for outstanding achievement in watercolour painting" to the best work in the show.

In January 2008, the CSPWC/SCPA hosted an exhibition at the John B. Aird Gallery/Galerie John B. Aird which honored the careers of ten outstanding Life Members. Titled "Treasures", this show was the best attended Aird Gallery exhibition in decades. The next year saw another ten Life Members honored in "Treasures 2009".

The Society is a regular contributor to bi-annual exhibitions at the Museo Nacional de le Acuarela in Mexico.

The Society has a long history of encouraging younger artists and with sponsored awards .

Since the 1980s each member upon election is required to donate a significant and typical work to the Society's Diploma Collection. This valuable resource which also includes earlier works by members is often referred to as the National Watercolour Collection. It is available as an exhibition and study resource, and part of the collection is exhibited on a regular basis.

== CSPWC/SCPA Presidents ==
- 1925-26 Robert Ford Gagen {honorary}
- 1926-28 Frederick Henry (Fred) Brigden
- 1928-31 C.W. Jefferys
- 1931-32 T.G. Greene
- 1932-34 Franklin Carmichael
- 1934-38 Peter Haworth
- 1938-41 Carl Schaefer
- 1941-43 Charles Goldhamer
- 1943-45 Caven Atkins
- 1945-46 Jack Bush
- 1946-48 William Winter
- 1948-50 Paraskeva Clark
- 1950-52 Charles Comfort
- 1952-54 Jock Macdonald
- 1954-56 Bobs Cogill Haworth
- 1956-58 Doris McCarthy
- 1958-60 Julius Griffith
- 1960-62 D. Mackay Houston
- 1962-64 John Richmond
- 1964-65 Donald Neddeau
- 1965-67 Viktorus Brickus
- 1967-69 Barbara L. Greene
- 1969-72 John Henry Martin
- 1972-77 John Bennett
- 1977-79 Ray Cattell
- 1979-81 Julius Griffith
- 1981-84 William Sherman
- 1984-86 Gery Puley
- 1986-88 Osvald Timmas
- 1988-91 Rudolf Stussi
- 1991-93 Marc Critoph
- 1993-95 Anthony J. Batten
- 1995-97 Margaret L. Squire
- 1997-99 Chuck Burns
- 1999-2001 Ed Shawcross
- 2001-03 Neville Clarke
- 2003-05 Tim Packer
- 2005-07 Marc L. Gagnon
- 2007-09 Marlene Madole
- 2009-11 Peter Marsh
- 2011-12 Katherine Zarull
- 2012-14 William Rogers
- 2014-19 Rayne Tunley
- 2019-21 Jean Pederson
- 2021-23 Sam L Boehner
- 2023-25 Marlene Madole
- 2025- Elizabeth Gilbert

== Elected members ==
- 1980-2015 Sharon Christian Holmes

== Bibliography ==
- "Canadian Who's Who", ISBN 978-1-4426-4155-6 University of Toronto Press
- "Painting in Canada, A History", ISBN 978-0-8020-6307-6 J. Russell Harper, University of Toronto Press, 1966
- "Passionate Spirits", ISBN 0-7720-1308-X, Rebecca Sisler, Clarke Irwin and Co.
