= Florence Helena McGillivray =

Canadian landscape painter

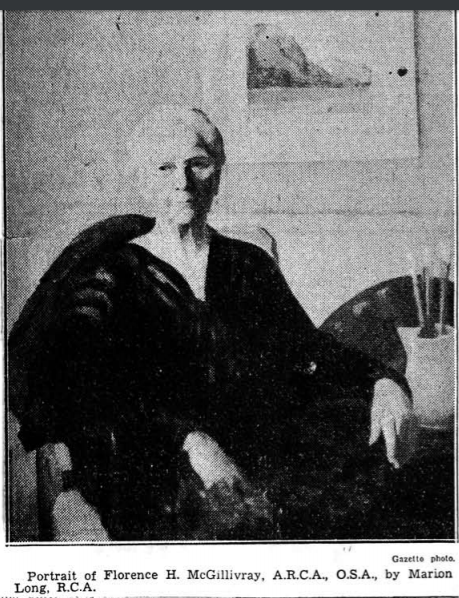
- Florence H. McGillivray, 1937
- Born: March 1, 1864; Township of Pickering, Canada West
- Died: May 7, 1938 (aged 74); Toronto, Ontario, Canada
- Known for: Painter, teacher

Florence Helena McGillivray RCA (March 1, 1864 – May 7, 1938), also known as F H. McGillivray, was a Canadian landscape painter known for her Post-Impressionist style. Her family home was in Whitby, Ontario. She lived in Ottawa from 1914 to 1928. She was also a teacher. In 1916, on a visit to his studio, she encouraged Tom Thomson.

== Early life, education and career ==
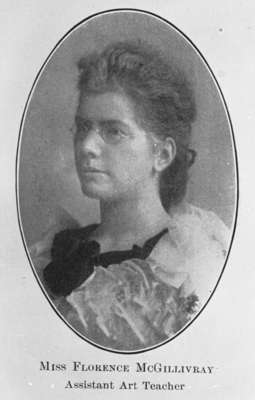
Florence Helena McGillivray, 1907

Florence McGillivray was born in Pickering Township in Canada West on March 1, 1864. She was the eleventh of thirteen children, and the youngest female of the Scottish immigrant farmer, George McGillivray (1813–1894) and his wife, Caroline Amelia Fothergill McGillivray (1828–1909).

In 1870, the family moved to Inverlynn, a house located at 1300 Gifford Street in Whitby, Ontario. To this day, the property has remained in the possession of George McGillivray's descendants. The children attended a grammar school in Whitby, and since McGillivray had shown artistic talent in her early years, she attended the Central Ontario School of Art (now the Ontario College of Art) in Toronto, where she studied with William Cruikshank. McGillivray then began taking private lessons from teachers such as Farquhar McGillivray Knowles and Lucius Richard O'Brien.

In the 1890s, McGillivray was renowned for painting on china. From 1892 until 1905, she worked as an art teacher at an all boys' school, Pickering College in Pickering, Ontario, and in Whitby at the Ontario Ladies' College (now Trafalgar Castle School) as a resident art teacher from 1906 to 1923.

In 1912, she went to France to study at the Académie de la Grande Chaumière with Lucien Simon and Émile-René Ménard (1862–1930). But her real inspiration was the artist Frédéric Fiebig and though she experimented at first with a wide range of Post-Impressionist styles, she began to work in a style that reflected his influence, involving the use of the palette knife and with a heavier application of paint. That year, she showed her new work at the Salon des Beaux Arts.

== Art career ==
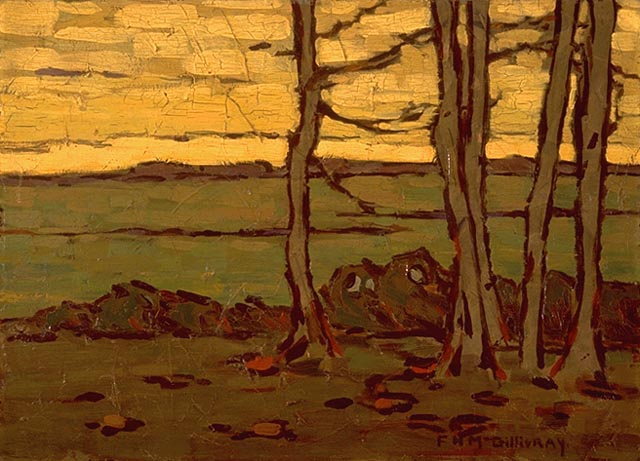
Afterglow, c. 1914, Florence H. McGillivray Canadian, 1864 - 1938 oil on paperboard 42 x 57.5 cm. National Gallery of Canada (no. 1041)

In 1913, McGillvray had her painting Contentment exhibited at the Salon des Beaux Arts in Paris. McGillivray moved back to Canada in 1914 due to the outbreak of World War I. The most prolific and vibrant phase of her artistic career occurred during the 1920s while she lived in Ottawa, where she set up a studio on Frank Street. Her work from this period is rich in colour and texture, reflecting the Post-Impressionist work she had encountered in Europe. Her method of rendering forms in massed areas of colour applied in places with the palette knife and strong black lines around forms, made her work stand out in the Canada of her day. This technique was sympathetic to Tom Thomson, who admired her and said of her, "she is one of the best".

McGillvray was one of the first women artists to paint the landscape of northern Ontario and Quebec. Her work depicted many locations on the Gatineau River, the Val-des-Bois, the Ottawa River at Fort-Coulonge and many more scenes of Canada and abroad in places such as Europe, Bermuda, Jamaica, Trinidad, Barbadoes and the Bahamas. She was part of the group of artists that linked the romantic-realist view of the railway artists in the 1880s and 1890s and the view of the landscape that characterized the work of the Group of Seven and their adherents following the World War I.

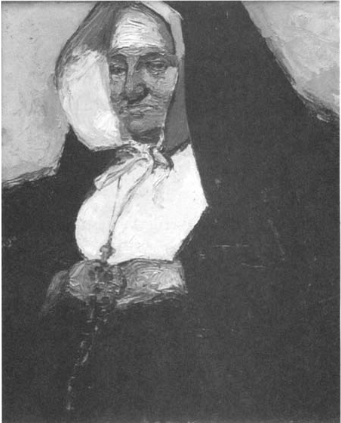
Contentment, c. 1913. Florence H. McGillivray Canadian, 1864 - 1938 oil on cardboard 41 x 32.7 cm Art Gallery of Ontario

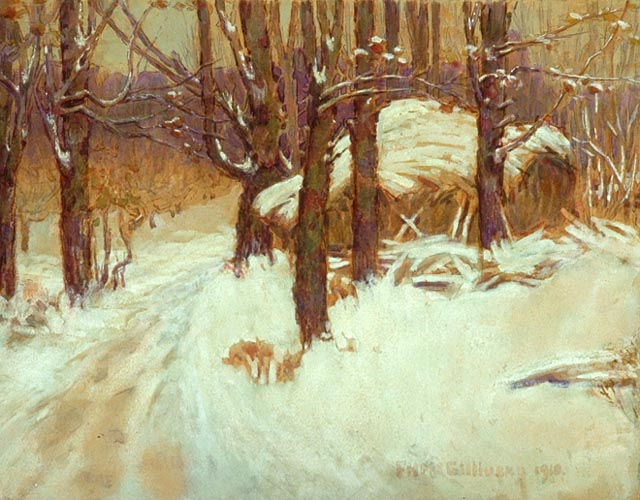
Midwinter, Dunbarton, Ontario, 1918 Florence H. McGillivray Canadian, 1864 - 1938, Watercolour over graphite on illustration board 40.2 x 50.6 cm, Purchased 1918 National Gallery of Canada (no. 1490)

== Exhibitions ==
- 1913 Salon des Beaux Arts, Paris, exhibited Contentment
- 1914 - 1935 exhibited with the Royal Canadian Academy of Arts
- 1917 - 1938 exhibited with the Ontario Society of Artists
- 1920 - 1930 exhibition venues included Malloney's in Toronto, Continental Galleries in Montreal; and artist's own Frank Street Studio in Ottawa
- 1924 British Empire Exhibition, Canadian Section of Fine Arts, Wembley, England
- 1927 Exposition d'art canadien, Musee du Jeu de Paume, Paris
- 1928 Exhibition of Paintings of At Home and Abroad by F.H. McGillivray, A.R.C.A., O.S.A., Art Association of Montreal
- 1970 retrospective exhibition, Whitby Arts, Whitby, Ontario
- 2002 The Birth of the Modern: Post-Impressionism in Canadian Art, c.1900-1920, Robert McLaughlin Gallery, Oshawa; travelled to Montreal, London (Ontario), Fredericton, and Winnipeg
- 2017 Finding Florence, retrospective exhibition, Station Gallery, Whitby, Ontario

== Selected public collections ==
Three of her paintings are part of the National Gallery of Canada collection, Midwinter, Dunbarton, Ontario (1918), Afterglow (1914), and St. Anthony Harbour, Newfoundland, (1926). Her work is also in the collections of the Art Gallery of Ontario, the Art Gallery of Hamilton, the Agnes Etherington Art Centre as well as galleries in Oshawa, Whitby, Kitchener, London, and Windsor.

== Affiliations ==
Florence Helena McGillivray was affiliated with a number of associations and groups during her lifetime. She joined the Women's Art Association of Canada where she studied painting on china with Mary Dignam, its founding president. McGillivray was welcomed into groups which included the Society of Women Painters and Sculptors of New York (1917) and the Women Painters and Sculptors Art Club. She continued her study of painting on china with Marshall Fry in New York in 1898 and sold her pieces later from her studio in Whitby. She also gave painting classes in Whitby.

In the later years of McGillivray's life she joined the Ontario Society of Artists (1917), became an Associate member of the Royal Canadian Academy of Arts (1924), and was a Charter member of the Canadian Society of Painters in Water Colour and its first woman member (1925).

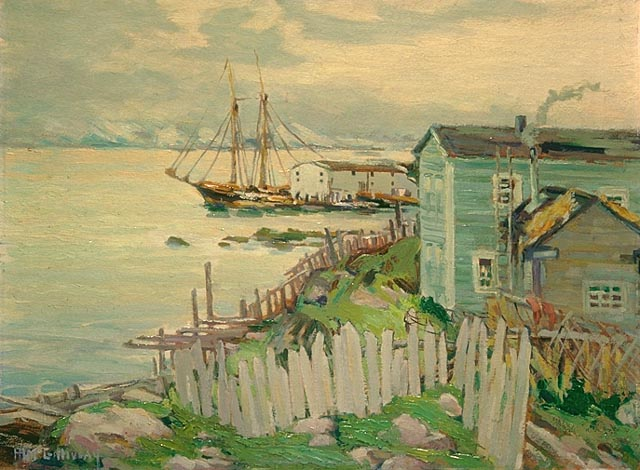
St. Anthony Harbour, Newfoundland, Florence H. McGillivray Canadian, 1864 - 1938 oil on canvas 46.7 x 61.6 cm Purchased 1926 National Gallery of Canada (no. 3352)

== Later years ==
McGillivray traveled extensively in search of new landscape scenery to paint. In 1930, by then in her mid-60s, McGillivray bought a house in Toronto where she retired. She continued to paint primarily from the sketches she had accumulated from around the world. In 1937, Marion Long painted her portrait, now in the Art Gallery of Ontario. Shown at the Royal Canadian Academy show that year, it was pronounced "capital" by a reviewer in the Montreal Gazette, November 19, 1937. McGillivray never married and had no children. She died at age 74 in Toronto, on May 7, 1938, and is buried in Oshawa's Union Cemetery.
