= Thomas Garland Greene =

Canadian painter and etcher

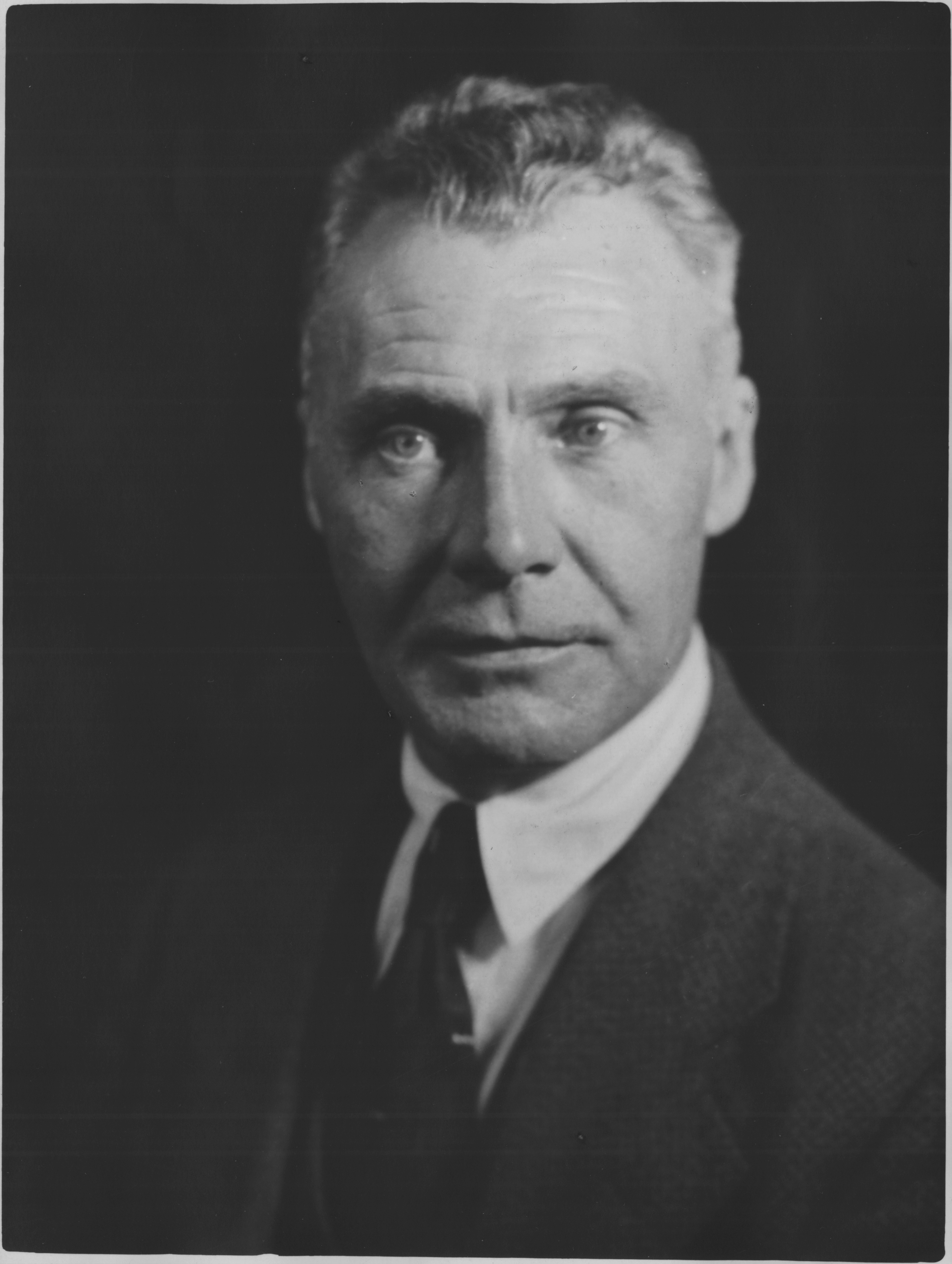
- Greene in 1930
- Born: September 12, 1875; Toronto, Ontario
- Died: November 18, 1955 (aged 80); Orillia, Ontario

Thomas Garland Greene (September 12, 1875- November 18, 1955) was a Canadian painter and etcher best known for his landscapes and etchings.

== Education and teaching career ==
Thomas Garland Greene (also known as T. G. Greene), was born in Toronto on 12 September 1875 to Thomas G. Greene and Maria Cumming Greene. He trained with the Toronto Engraving Company for seven years before studying with artist William Cruikshank at Toronto’s Central Ontario School of Art. In 1902, he left Toronto to continue his training in London, England, at the Westminster School of Art, and at the Finsbury Art School under Gilbert Bayes. In 1904, he returned to Ontario and taught art techniques at the Ontario Ladies College in Whitby until 1914, before also teaching at St. Andrew's College in Aurora and at the Northern Vocational School in Toronto. In 1937, Greene lectured at the Art Institute of Chicago for the Department of Education. He also wrote art catalogues and educational texts for children.

== Art clubs ==
Greene was an active member of various art clubs, beginning in 1897 when he joined the Polypictus Club. He became a member of the Ontario Society of Artists in 1911, the Arts and Letters Club in 1915, the Toronto Art Students' League, and the Mahlstick Club in 1915. In 1926, Greene was a founding member of the Canadian Society of Painters in Water Colour, becoming its President in 1929. He also co-founded the Canadian Society of Graphic Art, becoming its President from 1931 to 1933. He exhibited often at these clubs, as well as at the prestigious Royal Canadian Academy and at the Art Gallery of Toronto.

== Collections ==
Greene's artworks can be found in the collections of the National Gallery of Canada, the Art Gallery of Ontario, the McCord Museum, and the Ontario Government Collection.
