= J. Ernest Sampson =

Canadian artist (1887–1946)

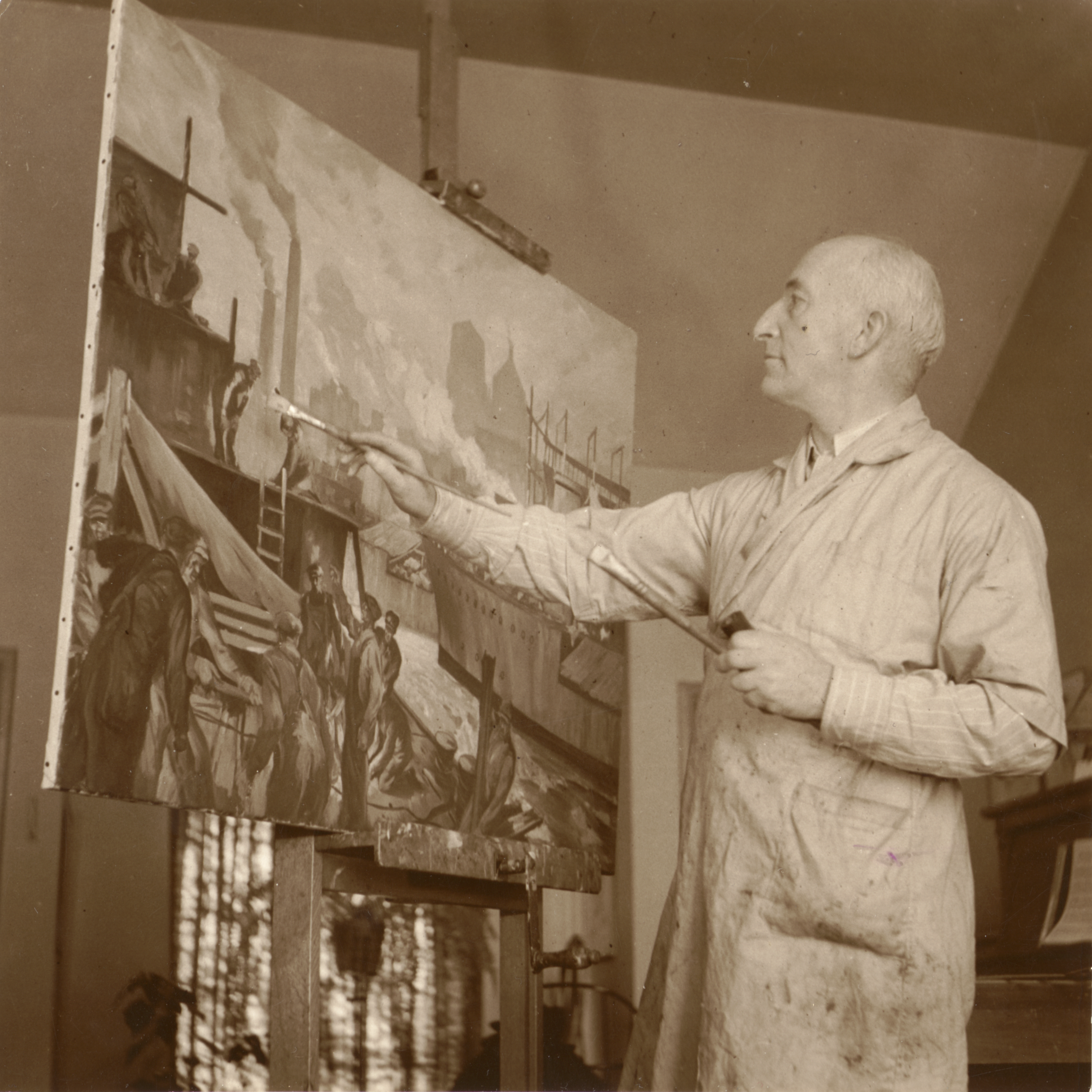
- Born: Joseph Ernest Sampson; 11 July 1887; Liverpool, England
- Died: 29 October 1946 (aged 59); York Mills, Toronto
- Education: Liverpool School of Art,: Julian Academy in Paris with Jean-Paul Laurens;, as well as the Grand Chaumière and Colarossi academies
- Known for: portrait and landscape artist
- Spouse: Ethel Gertrude Slee (m. 1918)

Joseph Ernest Sampson (July 11, 1887 – October 29, 1946), was an artist, designer and printer who was co-founder, senior partner and president of the printing firm of Sampson-Matthews Ltd. with Charles (Chuck) Matthews (1890–1990) from 1918 to 1946. He is best known today for the Sampson-Matthews silkscreens.

== Career ==
Sampson, born in Liverpool, was the eldest son of William Sampson, a Canadian Pacific Steamships superintendent engineer. He attended the Liverpool Academy of Art, where he won several awards as he did at the Julian Academy in Paris, as well as the Académie de la Grande Chaumière and Colarossi Academy which he attended later.

He moved to Canada in 1913, settling in Toronto where he became a member of the Ontario Society of Artists in 1914. In Toronto, he became art director at the printing firm of Stone Ltd (later Rolph-Clark-Stone Ltd), where he met Chuck Matthews and with him, started Sampson-Matthews Ltd in 1918. The firm was known in time for its design and print work.

In 1918, he designed Victoria Loan posters prints and painted for the Canadian War Records, including portraits and Armistice Day Toronto (1919).

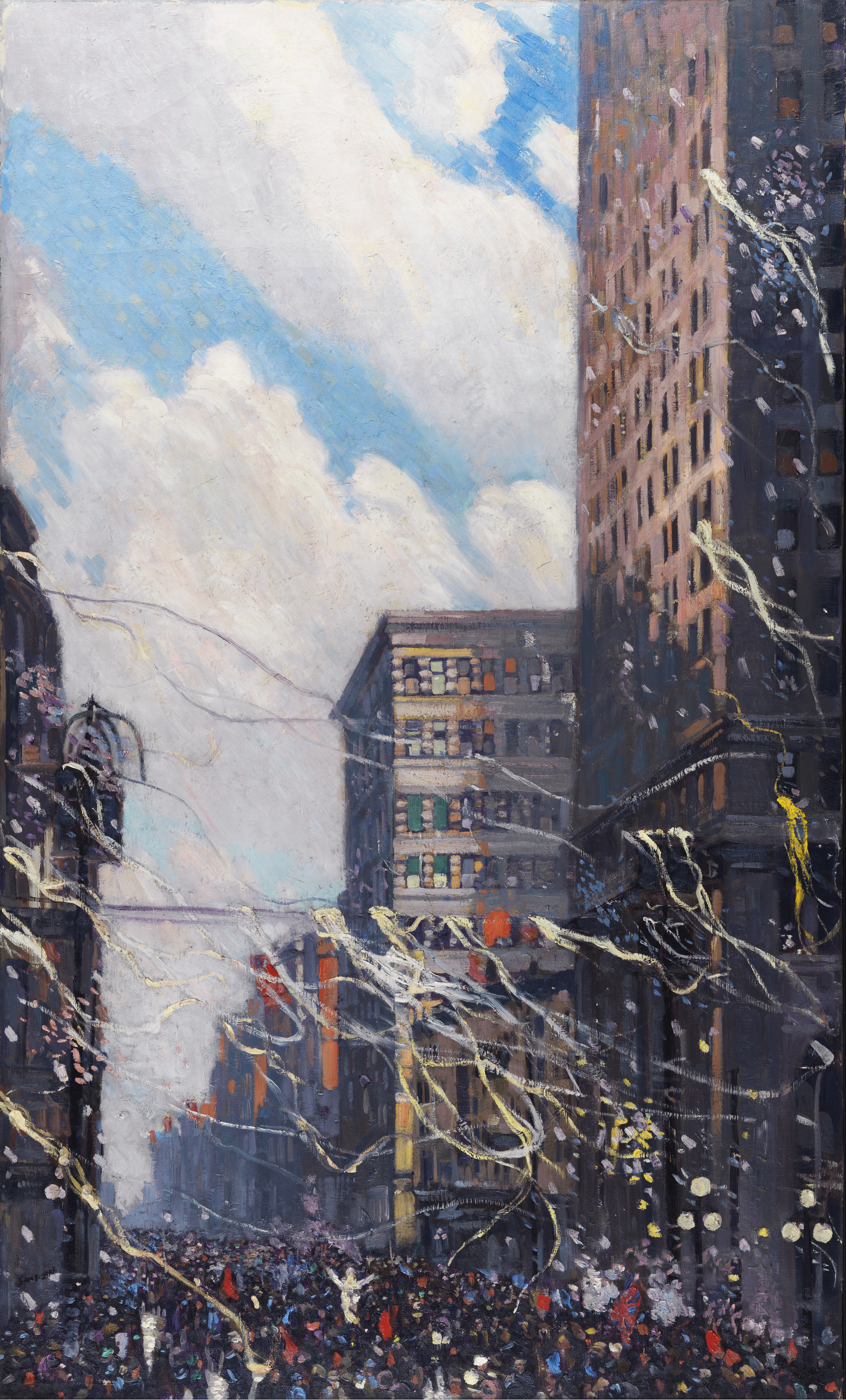
Joseph Ernest Sampson-Armistice Day, Toronto (CWM 19710261-0655)

== Work ==
Sampson's paintings are in such public collections as the Art Gallery of Ontario, the Government of Ontaruo Art Collection, the Canadian War Art Collection and elsewhere. He was a member of several artist groups in his career, including the Ontario Society of Artists (1914); the Arts and Letters Club (President 1938–1940); co-founder of the Canadian Society of Painters in Water Colour (CSPWC/SCPA); the Graphic Arts Club, Toronto; and an Associate Member of the Royal Academy of Arts (ARCA) (1939).

== Sampson-Matthews Silkscreens ==
The silkscreens began as reproductions of Canadian paintings by Canadian artists made for the Armed Forces. Group of Seven member A.Y. Jackson worked with Sampson-Matthews Ltd. and Sampson art director and Group of Seven member A.J. Casson in the choice of artist and subject matter. The first silkscreen was produced in 1941 and the project continued till 1963, serving as a publicizing tool for Canadian art and artists. The 117 Sampson-Matthews silkscreens are widely collected today.
