= L. A. C. Panton =

Canadian artist (1894–1954)

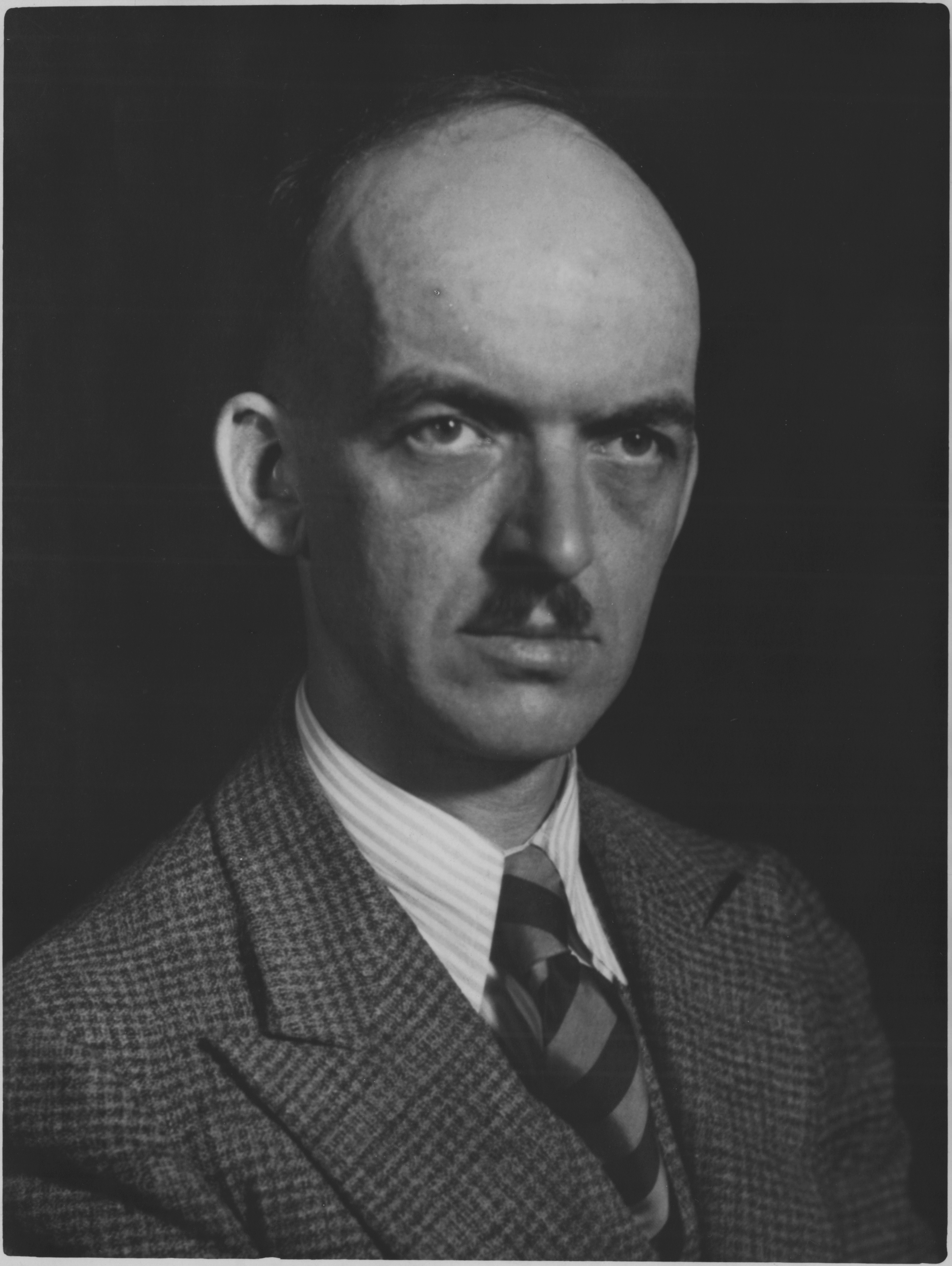
- Born: Lawrence Arthur Colley Panton; 1894; Egremont, Cheshire, England
- Died: 1954 (aged 59–60)
- Known for: painter, educator
- Spouse: Marion Pye (m. 1920)

Lawrence Arthur Colley Panton RCA or as he was known in his professional life L. A. C. Panton (1894–1954) was a Canadian painter and educator.

== Career ==
Panton was born at Egremont, Cheshire, in England, and emigrated to Canada at 17 years of age. He enlisted in Army in the First World War, serving in the 4th Division, Signal Company (1916–1919). After he returned from the war, he studied art at the Ontario College of Art in the evening. He also took classes at the Central Technical School in Toronto, then worked at Rous and Mann as a designer until 1924 when he got a job teaching art. He taught first at the Central Technical School, then at Western Technical School (1926–1937), and then as art director at Northern Vocational School (1937–1951) from which he took sabbatical leave to study with William C. Palmer (1950). Finally he became principal of the Ontario College of Art (1951–1954).

== Work ==
He was influenced by the Group of Seven in his painting at first, but his work became changed to become a synthesis of the natural world and abstraction. His retrospective in 1990 was appropriately titled Towards a lyrical abstraction.

== Exhibitions ==
Panton's work was shown in many exhibitions abroad such as the British Empire Exhibition, Wembley (1924); A Century of Canadian Art at the Tate Gallery (1938) and others. Over the years he held solo shows at Laing Galleries (1949) and elsewhere. A memorial exhibition of his work was shown by the Ontario Society of Artists at the Art Gallery of Toronto (1955) and a retrospective show was held at Hart House, University of Toronto (1974), as well as a show of his work by the Park Gallery, Toronto and in 1990, the Art Gallery of Ontario circulated a retrospective titled Towards a lyrical abstraction: the art of L.A.C. Panton, curated by Christine Boyanoski.

== Memberships ==
Panton was active in many organizations, including the Ontario Society of Artists (member in 1925, President 1931–1937), the Canadian Society of Painters in Water Colour (CSPWC/SCPA) which he helped found in 1925, the Canadian Society of Painter-Etchers and Engravers, the Canadian Society of Graphic Art, the Canadian Group of Painters, the Royal Canadian Academy of Arts (full member 1943), the Federation of Canadian Artists (1942, chairman, Ontario Division, 1945), and the Arts and Letters Club (President 1953–1954). He also worked with the Fine Arts Committee of the Canadian National Exhibition and the National Industrial Design Committee.

== Selected public collections ==
His work is found in such public collections as the Art Gallery of Ontario, Toronto; Museum London, Ontario; the National Gallery of Canada, Ottawa; the Winnipeg Art Gallery, Manitoba; the Robert McLaughlin Gallery, Oshawa and the National Gallery of Australia.

The L.A.C. Panton Fonds CA OTAG SC046 is in the Art Gallery of Ontario.

== Personal life ==
In 1920 he married Marion Pye; their son Charles was born in 1921 and died in action in 1944.
