= Anthony J. Batten =

Canadian visual artist (1940–2020)

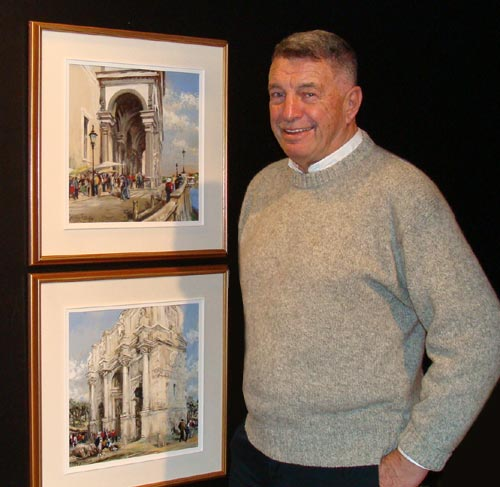
- Anthony J. Batten at the J. D. Carrier Gallery in Toronto, Ontario, Canada
- Born: 6 November 1940; Eynsham, Oxfordshire, England
- Died: 27 December 2020 (aged 80)
- Occupation: Visual artist

Anthony J. Batten (6 November 1940 – 27 December 2020) was a Canadian visual artist. He is best known for his architecturally inspired images that underscore contemporary disregard for architectural conservation.

== Early life and education ==
Batten was born at Eynsham Hall, in Oxfordshire, England in 1940. Receiving his early schooling in the UK, he moved to Canada in the 1950s. While still resident in England he had received a scholarship to attend Christ's Hospital School in Horsham, Sussex. He attended classes at L'Ecole des Beaux Arts and at the Museum School of the Montreal Museum of Fine Arts with Arthur Lismer.

== Career ==
While living in Montreal he regularly sketched in the old port area of the city attracted by the historic buildings and streetscapes. In 1966 Batten was commissioned by Canadian Industries Limited to produce a tourists' map of that historic area in readiness for the 1967 World's Fair (Expo '67). The map was reproduced widely in both official languages. That exposure resulted in him having his first exhibition in 1967 at La Galerie Place Royale. In 1968 Batten moved to Ontario to study at the University of Toronto.

=== Work ===
He was elected to the Canadian Society of Painters in Water Colour (CSPWC) in 1980 and later served as the Society's President from 1993 to 1995. He is also a member of the Ontario Society of Artists (OSA) and the Society of Canadian Artists (SCA).

He is also represented in the Canadian Senate, The Royal Canadian Military Institute, The Government of Ontario Art Collection, The Archives of Newfoundland and Labrador, The Royal Collection UK, the Vancouver Maritime Museum and the City of Toronto Archives.

=== Teaching career ===
Batten has served as an art teacher to the Scarborough Board of Education, Sir Oliver Mowat Collegiate Institute, Stephen Leacock Collegiate Institute, CBC's Institute of Scenography, University of Toronto's Woodsworth College and Royal Ontario Museum. In the mid 1980s he was the resident artist with the Canadian School at Cambridge University, England. He has produced architectural renderings for a number of clients including Rod Robbie and Robbie, Wright and Young. Batten's rendering of the Gardiner Museum was featured in the Art Gallery of Ontario's 2006 show on new culture related structures in Toronto.

=== Recognition ===
Anthony was the 1996 winner of the prestigious A.J. Casson Award. In 2002 he received the CSPWC's Julius Griffith Award and was made a Life Member in 2007. In recognition of his volunteer activism in arts, he was a recipient of the 125th Anniversary of the Confederation of Canada Medal in 1992. Later he was awarded both the 2002 Queen Elizabeth II Golden Jubilee Medal and the 2012 Queen Elizabeth II Diamond Jubilee Medal.

He was one of twenty five Canadian artists who as part of 2006's Arctic Quest traversed the North West Passage in celebration of the centennial of Roald Amundsen's historic expedition. He has for many years painted and exhibited internationally with a group of former colleagues collectively known as the PORDS.

== Bibliography ==
- "Arabella, Canadian Art, Architecture & Design Magazine" Volume 8, issue 1. Spring 2015. Pages 148 through 163. Written by Lorie Lee Steiner.
- "Canadian House & Home", Volume 8, issue 1, March 1986
- "Canadian Who's Who", University of Toronto Press (2010) ISBN 978-1-4426-4155-6 ISSN 0068-9963
- "International Artist" April/May 2000. ISSN 1440-1320
- "International Artist" June/July 2000 (International Masters). ISSN 1440-1320
- "Work Small, Learn Big" (Sketching with pen and watercolor), International Artists Publications, Chapter One ISBN 1-929834-27-6
- "Splash 8 Watercolour Discoveries", North Light Books (2004), ISBN 1-58180-442-3
- "How did you paint that?" 100 ways to paint landscapes, Vol 1. North Light Books (2004). ISBN 1-929834-41-1
- "How did you paint that?" 100 ways to paint favorite subjects, Vol 1. North Light Books ISBN 1-929834-46-2
- "Magazin 'Art"', Edition Internationale, Automne/Fall 2009 ISSN D356607
- "Biennial Guide to Canadian Artists in Galleries 2011-2012", Magazin 'Art (2011) ISBN 978-0-9680646-8-9
