= Rudolf Stussi =

Canadian painter, animator and illustrator (born 1947)

- Born: July 23, 1947 (age 79); Switzerland
- Education: Carleton University; Ontario College of Art
- Known for: Painter; Illustrator
- Website: www.rudolfstussi.com/%20Rudolf%20Stussi

Rudolf Stussi RCA (born July 23, 1947) is a Swiss-born Canadian painter, animator and illustrator based in Toronto, Canada.

== Biography ==
Stussi came to Canada in 1967 to attend Carleton University. He graduated from the Ontario College of Art in 1978.

Stussi was president of the Canadian Society of Painters in Water Colour (CSPWC) from 1988 to 1991. During his term, he established the CSPWC/SCPA Diploma Collection to document the evolution of water colour painting in Canada. In recognition of his contributions to the CSPWC, the Society awarded him The Julius Griffith Award in 2011.

Stussi was first hired as a background artist in 1987 by Nelvana where he worked on the award-winning series Little Bear and Rolie Polie Olie. Since then he has worked on a variety of animation projects around the world including the feature film, Asterix in Amerika by Gerhard Hahn and Jürgen Wohlrabe, 1994

He has illustrated several books, including:

- Periwinkle Isn't Paris by Marylin Eisenstein, Tundra Books (Canada), 1999.
- Heidi by Johanna Spyri, Desertina Switzerland, 2000
- Feuerlili by Silvio Huonder, Desertina Switzerland, 2012 ISBN 978-3-85637-436-5

He is represented by galleries in Canada, the United States, Switzerland, Germany, Austria and Israel. He was made a member of the Royal Canadian Academy of Arts.

== Bibliography ==
- Rudolf Stussi, Painter by Paul Duval, Benteli (Switzerland), 1988
