= Thomas Mower Martin =

English painter (1838-1934)

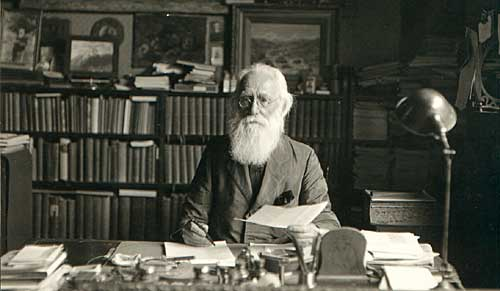
- Born: 1838; London, England
- Died: 1934
- Education: South Kensington Schools in London but was mostly self-taught in art
- Known for: painter, illustrator
- Spouse: Emma Nichols (1842–1911)

Thomas Mower Martin RCA (1838–1934) was an English-born Canadian landscape painter dubbed "the father of Canadian art"

== Life and work ==
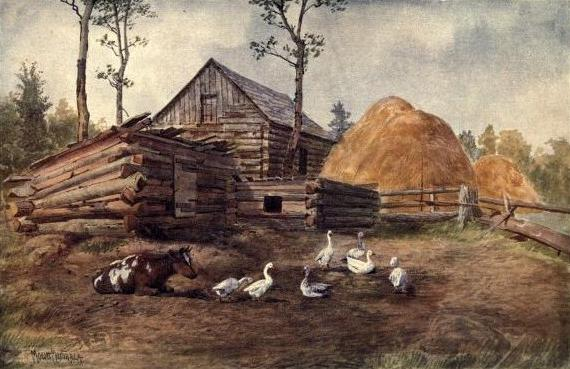
A settlers farm Yard, 1907

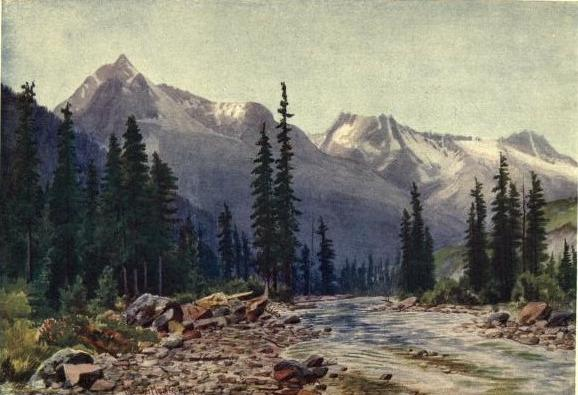
The Rocky mountains, 1907

Martin was born in London, England, the son of Edward H. Martin, sub-treasurer of the Inner Temple, and Susan Abernethy. He was educated at various schools and lastly, the Military school in Enfield his father wanted him to become a soldier with the East India Company. But he was orphaned at 15 years of age, lived with an aunt (Kezia, sister of his mother Susannah Abernethy, and widow of Thomas Mower) who supported his desire to not proceed with military life and leave school to become a carpenter and draughtsman. He had had a hobby of sketching and painting, for several years and now, took part-time instruction at the South Kensington Schools in London but was mostly self-taught in art.

He found life in London unpleasant, was restless for a healthier life style and took advantage of the Canadian government's offer of 107 free acres (0.43 km^{2}) of land to enable him to immigrate and be a pioneer settler. He married Emma Nichols (1842–1911)—they went on to have nine children. In 1862, they emigrated to British North America and built a small house in Muskoka, Ontario. Farming proved impossible because of the poor quality of the land and so the family moved and settled in Toronto, where Mower Martin soon became an established professional painter.

Martin produced landscapes, animals, still lifes and portraits in oils, watercolours and etchings. He was one of a group of artists given passes by the Canadian Pacific Railway to paint landscapes in western Canada—they became known as the "Railway Painters". Earlier he had travelled and painted landscapes through eastern Canada and the United States, and also provided illustrations for two books by A & C Black, Canada and Kew Gardens. He was a founding member of the Ontario Society of Artists in 1872, founding director of the Ontario School of Art (which today is OCAD University), and charter member of the Royal Canadian Academy of Arts in 1880, and was also a member of the Royal British Colonial Society of Artists (1909). Mower Martin exhibited widely as an artist during his lifetime and his works can be found in many public and private collections, including Windsor Castle in England.

Martin was a member of the Swedenborgian church and wrote philosophical leaflets for the organisation. He died at the age of 96 in 1934.

== Illustrated books ==
- Campbell, Wilfred. Canada (A & C Black, 1907).
- Moncrieff, A. R. Hope. Kew gardens (A & C Black, 1908).
- Bealby, J. T. Peeps at many lands: Canada. (A & C Black, 1909).
- Graeme, Toni Father of Canadian Art(TGraeme Enterprises, 2009).
