= C. J. Way =

English artist (1835-1919)

Charles Jones Way
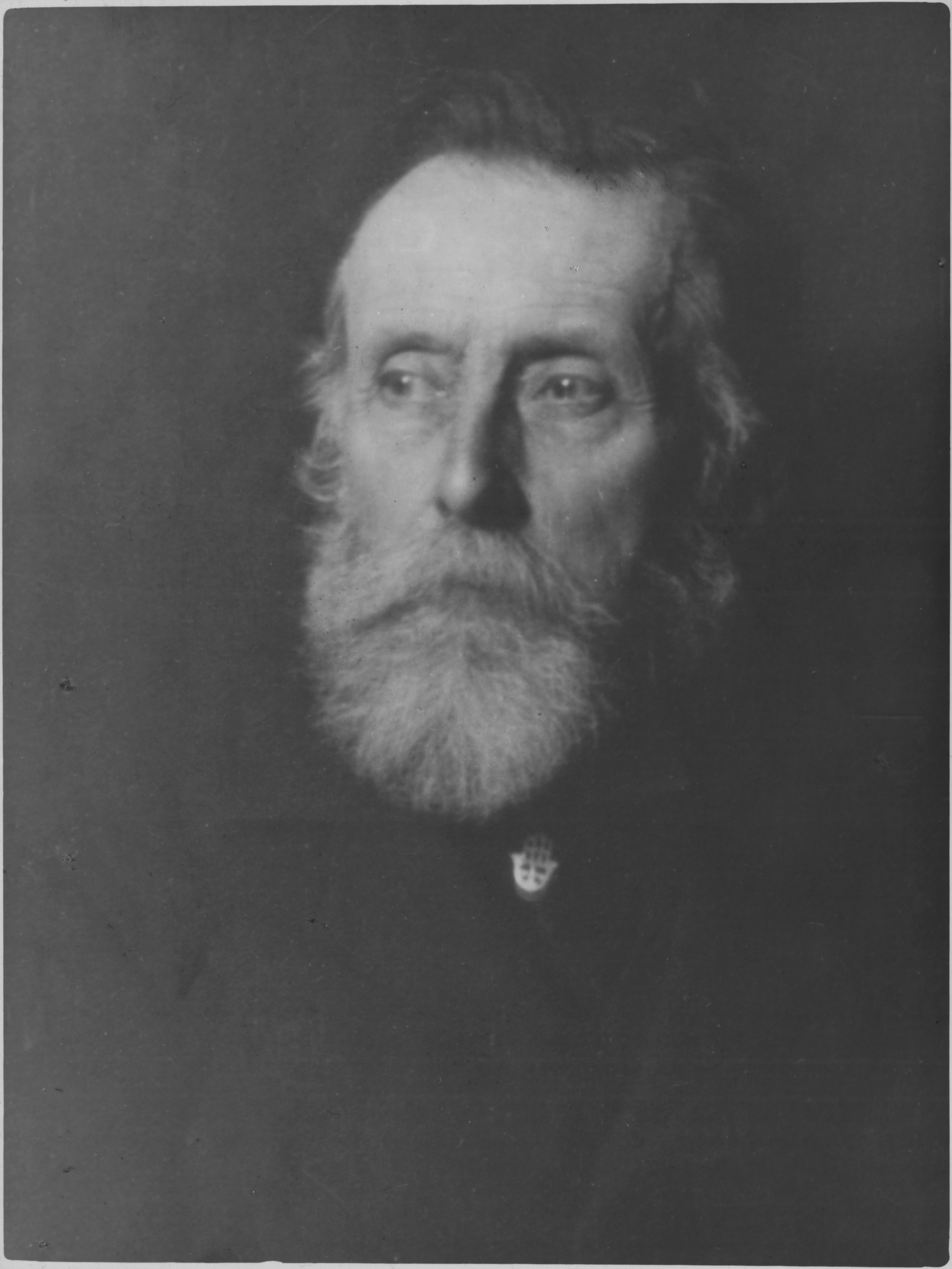
- Born: July 25, 1835; Dartmouth, Devon, England
- Died: February 13, 1919 (aged 83); Lausanne, Switzerland
- Education: South Kensington School of Art, London
- Spouse: Mary Ker Thomson (m. 1869)

C. J. Way (Charles Jones Way) RCA (July 25, 1835 – February 13, 1919) was an English artist who travelled to North America to discover scenery for his landscape and seascape paintings. Besides scenic views of Canada and the United States, his subjects included England, Wales, Italy and the Swiss Alps. Initially a watercolour artist, he began to work in oils in the 1870s.

== Career ==
Way was born in Dartmouth, Devon, England. His father William Hopkins Way was an artist. At a young age Way showed talent in painting, and studied at Somerset House in London. He continued his training at the Central School of Art, first at Marlborough House, then at the South Kensington School of Art, studying with Sir Richard Redgrave. Way graduated in 1858 as an artist and instructor.

He arrived in Montreal in 1858, and established a studio where he taught drawing and painting as well as working for William Notman as a colorist. He was one of the founders of the Art Association of Montreal (AAM) in 1860, the year that the AAM organized an Industrial Exhibition at the Crystal Palace (Montreal) where his paintings were prominently exhibited with the result that the Prince of Wales chose one of Way's paintings, The Prince's Squadron off Gaspé Basin for himself. Way was praised in September in the Montreal Daily Witness (September 1, 1860) as an artist of "varied talents". A short three years later, in 1863, he exhibited four paintings in the National Academy of Design in New York. He is said to have met Robert S. Duncanson in 1863 and traveled with Duncanson (as well as Allan Edson) to London, England after the Civil War.

In 1864, the book "North American Scenery, Being selections from C.J. Way's Studies, 1863-64", a pictorial album of views of North American Scenery with 12 mounted photographs by W. Notman was produced from Way's sepia watercolour studies by Notman. In 1865, "Notman's Photographic Selections, Second Series", reproduced Way's English and Welsh scenic landscapes, the result of a trip to England in 1864. In 1865, Way exhibited paintings with the Royal British Society of Artists and the Royal Academy of Arts in London as well as exhibiting his work in Montreal in 1864 and 1865.

He was President of the Society of Canadian Artists (formed in 1867) in 1870 with whom he exhibited in their second exhibition (1870). Also in 1870, Way was elected a Councillor of the Art Association of Montreal (AAM) and his painting Monte Rotondo was selected as the AAM's first purchase. The same year Way was elected to the Board of the Arts and Manufacturers - he was the only artist - because they intended to establish an art school.

In the spring of 1873, due to a smallpox outbreak in Montreal, Way and his family travelled to London, England. In 1874, they moved to Switzerland and settled in Lausanne where he became a member of the Société des Peintres et Sculpteurs Suisses. Way continued to send paintings for exhibition at the Royal Canadian Academy and the Art Association of Montreal. In 1876 he showed six paintings in oil and watercolour in the Canadian section of the Centennial International Exposition in Philadelphia and was awarded a silver medal.

In 1880 Way was elected an Academician of the Royal Canadian Academy of Arts (RCA) in Ottawa, and was considered a charter member of the newly formed Academy, although he was an honorary non-resident member. In 1884 he donated a watercolour to the Royal Canadian Academy of Arts' collection of fine art that formed the beginning of the National Gallery of Canada's collection. Way continued to maintain his connections with Montreal and send paintings depicting European and British landscapes for exhibition with the Royal Canadian Academy and the Art Association of Montreal until a year before he died.

In 1898 Way was commissioned by the Canadian Pacific Railroad (CPR) to paint a series of Canadian landscapes. He returned to Canada for about two years with his daughter Aimée, also an artist, and became a member of the Pen and Pencil Club of Montreal. It was reported in a local paper that he intended to make Montreal his home and that in many houses there were paintings from his early career. Way began his CPR commission on the Atlantic coast and travelled westward along the railway line to British Columbia. In 1899 he exhibited paintings of the Rocky Mountains with the RCA. His job finished, he returned to Lausanne, Switzerland where he died in 1919.

His work is in a number of public collections in England and Canada including the Royal Collections, London and the National Gallery of Canada, Art Gallery of Ontario, Montreal Museum of Fine Arts, McCord Museum and elsewhere.

== Record sale prices ==
In its auction of June 15, 2022, Cowley Abbott Auction realized a price of $24,000, an Auction Record for Niagara Falls, a watercolour, dated 1864, 30 x 48 ins ( 76.2 x 121.9 cms ).
