= Ontario Society of Artists =

Professional artist society based in Canada

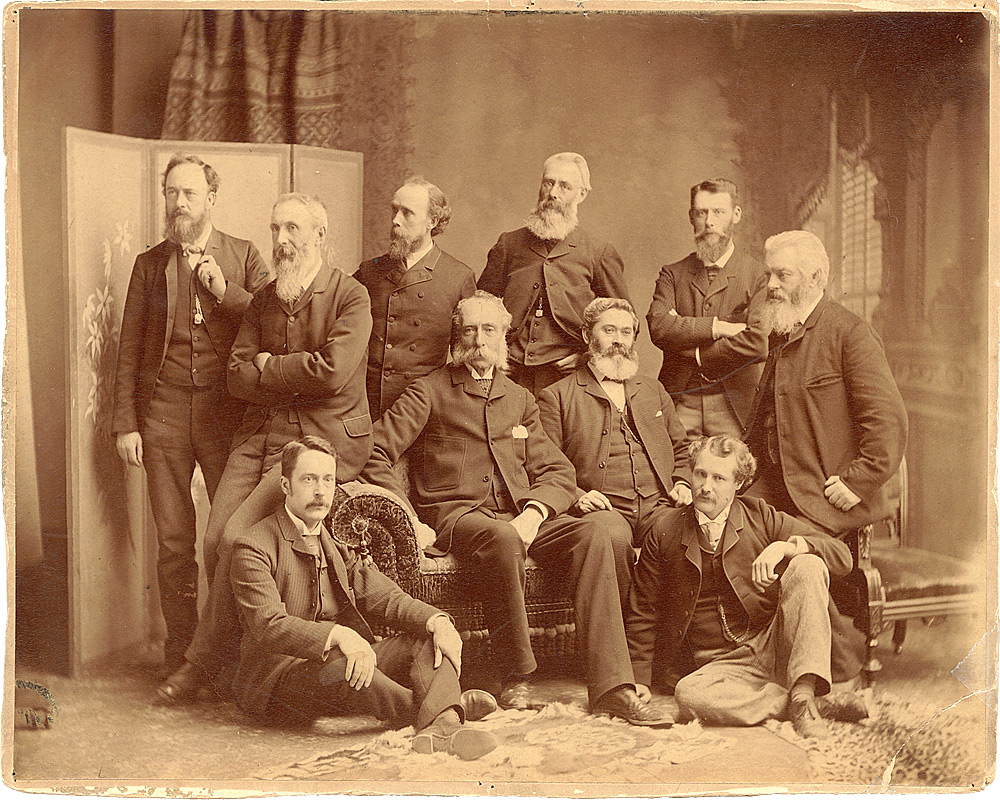
Ontario Society of Artists Members (1889)

The Ontario Society of Artists (OSA) was founded in 1872. It is Canada's oldest continuously operating professional art society. When it was founded at the home of John Arthur Fraser, seven artists were present. Besides Fraser himself, Marmaduke Matthews, and Thomas Mower Martin were there, among others. Charlotte Schreiber was the first woman member in 1876 and showed work in the Society's Annual show of that year.

The list of objectives drawn up by the founding executive included the "fostering of Original Art in the province, the holding of Annual Exhibitions, the formation of an Art Library and Museum and School of Art". Prominent businessman William Holmes Howland was invited to be President of the Society.

== Fostering art ==
The OSA, in its early years, had a major effect on the development of art in Ontario, if not in Canada. Its annual shows were reviewed regularly by major Toronto newspapers and the development of its artists and their work was followed in detail. For instance, the Evening Telegram in Toronto, in May 1880, reported with pride that the oils in the annual show displayed a "most marked and gratifying progress". However, with the appearance of other organizations, such as the Canadian Art Club in 1907, and particularly the Group of Seven in 1920, as well as the development of public and private galleries, its annual shows began to receive less attention.

Still, the OSA's annual shows, from first to last, provided a place where artists could sell their work and socialize. It organized the Toronto Guild of Civic Art, which implied mural painting, and led in turn to the Society of Mural Decorators. It organized free lectures on subjects, and later, organized public events to showcase Ontario artists and provide a forum for emerging artists. Members of the Society have had mentorship programs for artists at various times. The OSA today has biennial Emerging Artist Exhibitions and annual Open Juried Exhibitions, both of which are designed to support and inspire art and artists across Ontario.

== Art exhibitions ==
The first exhibition was held at Notman & Fraser's Art Galleries, Toronto, in April 1873. The Society continues to hold annual and special events. The OSA has an annual Members' Exhibition of Selected Works which showcases art from members who choose to participate. The list of galleries used extensively by the OSA includes The John B. Aird Gallery, The Papermill Gallery at Todmorden Mills and the Neilson Park Creative Centre Gallery. As of 2019, the OSA is also showing their exhibitions online in galleries on their website.

== Art gallery ==
It was not until 1900 that the Society was in a position to form an art museum and upon the death of Mrs. Goldwin Smith of The Grange in 1909, it was found that she had willed her property to the Art Museum. It began under the name of the Art Museum of Toronto and is now the Art Gallery of Ontario. The Museum began using the Toronto Public Library on College Street to exhibit its collection. It did so from 1910 until 1919. The Society's annual exhibitions held during this period were also held at the library. When the new galleries in the Art Museum of Toronto were opened in 1920, the Society began holding its annual show in the new Art Gallery of Toronto. This venue for the annual show lasted until 1967.

== Art school ==
The Society was concerned about the lack of art education in Ontario. The Mechanics Institute provided basic classes in technical subjects but art instruction was limited to private lessons in the homes or studios of established artists. The Society obtained a grant of $1,000.00 in 1876. The grant allowed renovation of leased premises at 14 King Street West to create art school classrooms with the balance used as gallery space. The modest classrooms opened the Ontario School of Art on October 30, 1876. The enrollment was 25 students.

Although the school continued to flourish, its financial situation was uncertain because the Society could not secure long-term funding from the government. In 1883, a new arrangement between the Society and the government resulted in the school moving to the Toronto Normal School building in St. James Square, now the location of Toronto Metropolitan University. By 1884, relations between the Society and the government collapsed. The Society's vice president and Royal Canadian Academy president, Lucius Richard O'Brien, resigned. His exasperation appears in his letter of resignation:

I beg to resign my position as member of the Council of the Ontario School of Art. The teachers are hampered and the teaching impaired by injudicious arrangements and restrictions, and finding every attempt at improvement thwarted by the representative of the Government on the board, or through his influence, I decline to be held responsible for the injury to the school which has accrued and must continue to accrue from such a course.

The Society ceased involvement with the school until 1890. The efforts of the Society ultimately succeeded with the development of what is now OCAD University.

== Members ==
Original membership included persons from a variety of visual art professions. Many of Ontario's foremost artists have belonged to the OSA. Early member records and artifacts of the Society are held by the Province of Ontario Archives. The Society's current membership exceeds 200 artists.

Members of the OSA included:

- Tom Thomson (1877-1917)
- Kenneth Forbes (1892-1980)
- Hamilton MacCarthy (1846-1939)
- Betty Mochizuki (born 1929)
- Byron Edmund Walker (1848-1924)
- J.E.H. MacDonald (1873-1932)
- Homer Watson (1855-1936)
- Arthur Lismer (1885-1969)
- A.Y. Jackson (1882-1974)
- A. J. Casson (1898-1992)
- Franklin Arbuckle (1909-2001)
- E.B. Cox (1914-2003)
- Dora de Pedery-Hunt (1913-2008)
- Doris McCarthy (1910-2010)

== Honours ==
As the result of a successful anti-logging campaign led by A.Y. Jackson, a lake in what is now Killarney Provincial Park in Ontario was named O.S.A. Lake in 1933 (it had formerly been called Trout Lake) after the Ontario Society of Artists. O.S.A. Lake can be found at 46.0542°N 81.4002°W.

== See also ==
- Canadian art
- Not-for-profit arts organization
