= William Walker Alexander =

Canadian artist (1870–1948)

- Born: 9 August 1870; Toronto, Ontario
- Died: 3 April 1948 (aged 77); Toronto, Canada
- Education: Central School of Design Ontario College of Art, Toronto; Studio of G. A. Reid; Pennsylvania Academy of Fine Arts with Thomas Eakins (1880s)
- Known for: printmaker and bookplate maker
- Spouse: Mabel Inness

William Walker Alexander (9 August 1870 – 3 April 1948), who signed his work W. W. Alexander, was a printmaker and bookplate maker.

== Biography ==
Alexander was born in Toronto and educated at the Central School of Design (the Ontario College of Art), Toronto. He began an apprenticeship at the age of 16 in the engraving studio of his older brother, John Alexander, then worked in the studio of G. A. Reid in Toronto and the Pennsylvania Academy of Fine Arts with Thomas Eakins (1880s). In Philadelphia, he worked in a Banknote engraving company.

When he returned to Toronto, he worked for his brother's firm, Alexander and Cable Lithographing Company in Toronto, becoming head of the art department. His specialty was etchings, engravings and bookplates. He designed and engraved over 40 bookplates, each distinguished by an artistic suggestion on his part about the character of the owner of the books, and 30 etchings and aquatints by 1939. Besides his prints and bookplates, he was an authority on crests and armorial bearings and made these for patrons. He also engraved Memorial tablets in brass and cast iron for churches and public buildings. His watercolours often resulted from trips with the Toronto Canoe Club. In 1904 with Robert Holmes, he sketched in Algonquin Park in a canoe, being among the first of the Toronto artists to discover and sketch in the Park.

He exhibited his work at the Ontario Society of Artists in Toronto at the Art Association of Montreal and at the Royal Canadian Academy of Arts in 1912, 1918, 1922, and 1924. His aquatint Bridge at Twilight (Art Gallery of Ontario) was shown at the 1924 British Empire Exhibition.

He was one of the founders of the Toronto Art Students' League in 1886 and assisted in the lithographing of the Toronto Art League Calendars. He also helped found the Society of Graphic Art (1906) and served as its President (1908–1909). He was a member of the Mahlstick Club, founded in 1899, and the Arts and Letters Club (1908). With W.J. Thomson, John Wesley Cotton, T.G. Greene, and Charles Macdonald Manly, he played a leading role in the establishment of the Canadian Society of Painter-Etchers and Engravers in 1916. He was a member of the American Society of Bookplate Collectors and Designers which honoured him in 1939 by an article in the in Society's year book.

His engravings are in the collections of the National Gallery of Canada in Ottawa, the Art Gallery of Ontario and the Royal Ontario Museum, both in Toronto, the Burnaby Art Gallery, and the American Antiquarian Society of Worcester, Massachusetts. His bookplates are also in the Thomas Murray Bookplates Collection at the University of British Columbia Library.

== Awards ==
- Bronze medal, British and Colonial Exhibition (1907) for design, London England
- First prize, 1936 for best lithographed bookplate, Bookplate Association International, Los Angeles
