= Margaret Shelton (artist) =

Canadian artist (1915–1984)

- Born: 15 August 1915; Bruce, Alberta, Canada
- Died: 18 November 1984 (aged 69); Calgary, Alberta, Canada
- Known for: Graphic artist
- Website: https://margaretshelton.ca/

Margaret Dorothy Shelton (1915–1984) was a Canadian artist who lived nearly all of her life in Alberta. She worked in a number of mediums but is best known for her block printing.

== Biography ==
Margaret Shelton was born August 15, 1915, in Bruce, Alberta. From 1933 to 1934, she attended the Normal School in Calgary eventually earning her teaching certificate and teaching for a brief time. She attended night and summer classes at the Provincial Institute of Technology and Art (PITA) from 1934 through 1943. In 1938, she earned her MFA from the Banff School of Fine Arts.

Shelton was a member of the Alberta Society of Artists, the Calgary Sketch Club, the Canadian Society of Graphic Art, and the Society of Canadian Painter-Etchers and Engravers. She had major exhibitions at the Burnaby Art Gallery, British Columbia in 1981, and at the Glenbow Museum, Calgary in 1985.

Shelton died in 1984 in Calgary.

Shelton was included in the 2012 exhibition Alberta Mistresses of the Modern: 1935-1975 at the Art Gallery of Alberta.

== Bibliography ==
- Ainslie, Patrici. Margaret Shelton: Block Prints 1936-1984 Glenbow Museum, exhibition catalogue, Calgary, Alberta, 1984 ISBN 0919224466
- Cochran, Bente Roed. Printmaking in Alberta, 1945-1985 University of Alberta Press, Edmonton, Alberta, 1989 p159 ISBN 0888641397
