= Victor Child =

Canadian artist (1897–1960)

Victor Llewellyn Child (1897–1960) was a Canadian painter, etcher and newspaper illustrator. A senior pen-and-ink commercial artist at the Toronto Telegram for much of his professional career, in private life he produced landscapes and portraits in watercolours and oils.

== Career ==
Victor Child was born in Palmerston, Ontario, and studied first in Toronto at the Ontario College of Art with George Agnew Reid, Charles Macdonald Manley (Manly) and John William Beatty, and later in London at Heatherley's. While in England during the First World War he served with the Royal Flying Corps. In 1920 he joined the Canadian Society of Graphic Art, exhibiting his etchings and illustration drawings with the society in 1925–1927 and 1931–1933 at the Art Gallery of Toronto.

The prominent Toronto printing firm Rous and Mann commissioned his work in 1927 for its Canadian Artists' series Christmas cards in company with distinguished painters such as Casson, Harris and Varley. Victor Child was again among these artists when in 1934 he donated work for the André Lapine Benefit exhibition chaired by Sir Wyly Grier. During the 1920s and '30s he was on staff at the Mail & Empire and Star Weekly newspapers in Toronto as an illustrator. He married portrait painter Marjorie Thompson in 1928. Later, in 1940, he joined the Telegram and worked there until his death.

Child was a decidedly conservative artist. He illustrated religious subjects for the Salvation Army and the Anglican Church of Canada and worked on instructional materials for the Toronto Board of Education. For their annual shows in 1946 and 1947 he exhibited canvases with the Ontario Society of Artists.

Perhaps the most significant moment in Canadian art history that involved Child's paintings occurred in 1959 when his work was featured in the exhibition Points of View, organized by Clare Bice, curator of the Public Library and Art Museum in London, Ontario. At this show, visitors saw the work of the traditionalist/realist Ontario Institute of Painters, of which Child was a founding member in 1958, hung beside paintings by the Canadian modernist abstract group Painters Eleven. Crowds of art enthusiasts, especially at Hart House in Toronto were large. As a popularity contest in critical opinion it was perhaps a draw, but the fame of the abstract artists soon far eclipsed that of the realists. Victor Child died in Toronto on July 12 of the following year.
