= Toronto Art Students' League =

Canadian art organizations (1886-1904)

- Formation: 1886; 140 years ago
- Founder: John David Kelly, William Walker Alexander, Charles Macdonald Manly, and Alfred H. Howard
- Type: Arts association
- Legal status: Charity
- Purpose: mutual study from life, for picture composition classes and for outdoor sketching
- Headquarters: Toronto, Ont., Canada
- Region served: Canada
- Official language: English, French

The Toronto Art Students' League (TASL) or the Toronto Art League as it was called from 1899 on was an association of artists that existed from 1886 to 1904 and advocated drawing from the antique, and drawing and painting from life as a key to making art. It was a way of circulating recent art developments such as the Arts & Crafts movement and Art Nouveau as well as serving as a training ground and as a way of providing encouragement and fellowship for younger artists. It met about once a week to produce drawings from life and its operative mottos were the disciplinary "Nulla Dies Sine Linea" and "Non Clamor Sed Amor".

The League followed examples such as the New York Art Students’ League ([NYASL), founded in 1875, and the Art Students’ League of Philadelphia, which was established in 1886 (Toronto Leaguers followed its founding closely). Its formation was largely as a consequence of the inactivity of the Toronto School of Art. The League founders were John David Kelly, William Walker Alexander, Charles Macdonald Manly and Alfred H. Howard. William Daniel Blatchly was elected the first president of the League, and Howard the first secretary. It included in its membership printmakers such as John Wesley Cotton and Blatchly, as well as artist/illustrators John David Kelly, C. W. Jefferys and Fred Brigden among others.

Women were admitted to membership in the League in 1890. Members contributed to the League Calendars (1893-1904) which covered virtually all phases of Canadian life in its illustrations and are today considered a milestone in the history of graphic art in Canada. The Toronto Art League Calendars were given their own show by the National Gallery of Canada in 2008 with sample pages from each calendar together with original drawings, curated by Charles C. Hill.

Members of the League were also included in the League exhibitions, begun in 1899 and lasting until 1901. Sketching trips were taken by League members as far away as the Niagara Peninsula, Muskoka, Quebec City, and the Richelieu River Valley. A feeling for Canadian art "was transmitted through the teaching of some of its members, such as Robert Holmes, Manly and J.E.H. MacDonald at the Central Ontario Art School (later the Ontario College of Art and Design), and in their work and that of others... as an influence on the students who succeeded us", said Jefferys who credits the League with being the origin of the Canadian Landscape School and thus, ultimately of the Group of Seven.

By 1899 the active function of the League was largely absorbed by its offshoot, the Mahlstick Club, and the founding in 1903 of the Graphic Arts Club (GAC), with Jefferys acting as first president. The GAC became the Canadian Society of Graphic Art in 1924, and evolved into the establishment of the Canadian Society of Painter-Etchers and Engravers in 1916.

Work by many of the League members can be found in '"The Ontario Collection" in the catalogue of its collection by Fern Bayer (FitzHenry and Whiteside, 1984) or online in the Ontario Government art collection. An extensive group of C. M. Manley drawings is in the collection of the Ontario College of Art and Design.
