= Charles Macdonald Manly =

Canadian painter (1855–1924)

C. M. Manly
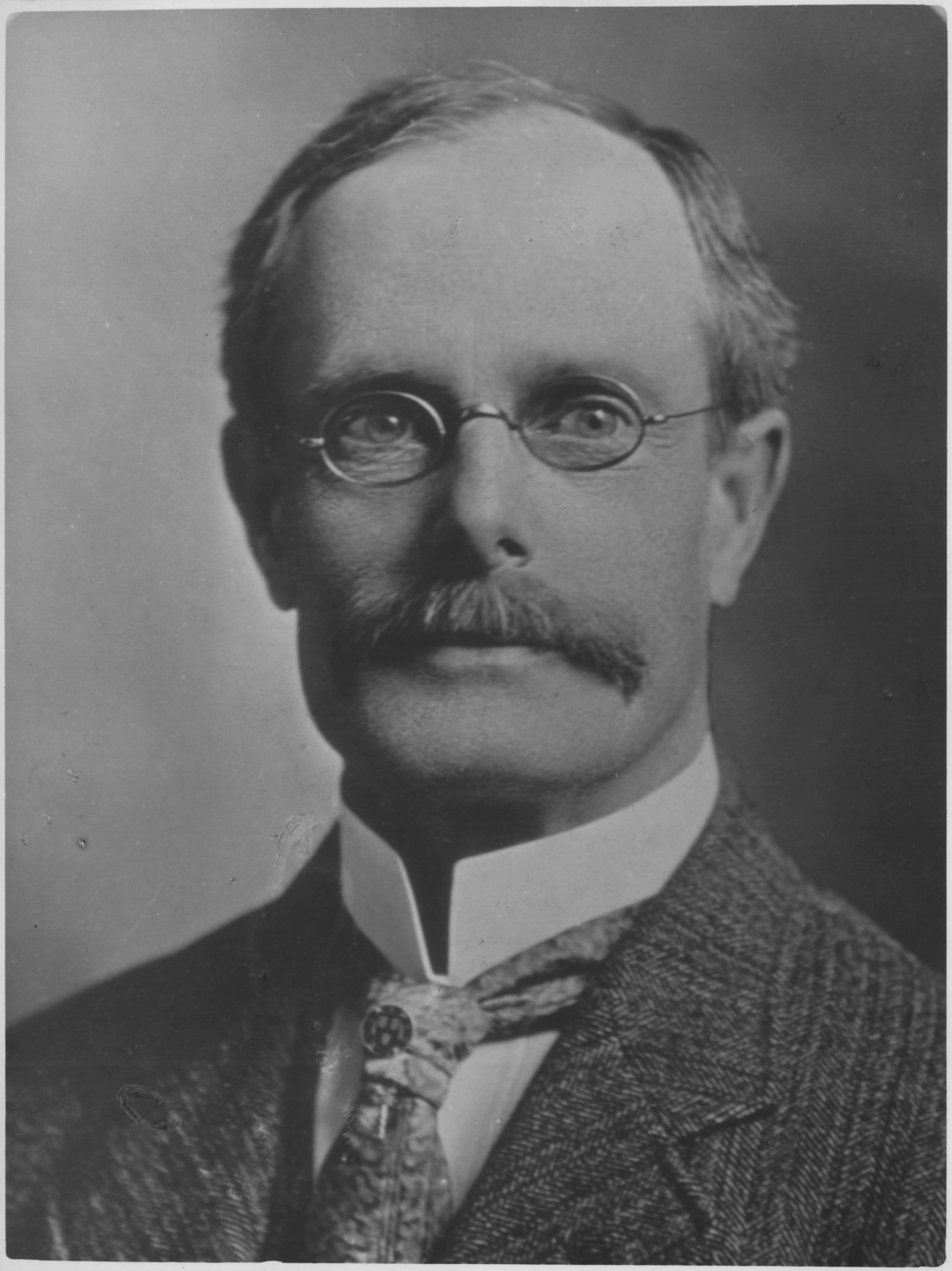
- Born: Charles Macdonald Manly; 1855; Englefield Green, Surrey, England
- Died: 1924 (aged 68–69); Toronto
- Education: London and Ireland (until 1884)
- Known for: lithographer, painter in watercolor and oil, pen-and-ink, ink wash drawings and pastels, educator
- Awards: Honourable Mention at the Pan American Exposition (1901); Montreal Spring Exhibition (1911)

Charles Macdonald Manly who signed his name C. M. Manly (Note: Manly's middle name is sometimes spelled 'MacDonald' as in J. Russell Harper in Early Painters and Engravers of Canada who gives his name as Charles MacDonald Manly.) (September 1855 – April 3, 1924) was a lithographer, painter, sketcher and educator in the early days of Canadian art.

== Biography ==
Manly was born in Englefield Green, Surrey, England. His father was a Methodist minister. His family emigrated to Canada when he was young, finally settling in Toronto in 1876.

After working in lithography for some years in Canada, in the late 1880s, he went to England to study at the Heatherley School of Fine Art, London with Andrew Maclure and then, Ireland, where he attended the Metropolitan School of Art, in Dublin (1881-1884) (renamed the National College of Art and Design (NCAD)) with Edwin Lyme. Afterwards, he worked in London as a lithographer, then settled in Toronto, where he helped found the Toronto Art Students' League (1886-1904) (he wrote an unpublished account of the League later).

The League promoted drawing from life and Canadian subjects. It led to several successors. Manly's work appeared in almost all the League Calendars (1893-1904). These are considered by scholars and the public alike as a high point in the history of the graphic arts in Canada. There was a show about them at the National Gallery of Canada library and archives in 2008, curated by Charles C. Hill.

Manly went sketching with Frederick Henry (Fred) Brigden in Eastern Ontario, Quebec, and the Maritimes (1894-1906). In 1901, he first visited Conestogo, Ontario. He came back each year to sketch in the area until 1918, when he bought property in this district. He wrote articles about the Conestogo country for the Canadian Magazine (May 1908) and did illustrations in colour for a book published in 1909, Canada by J.T. Bealby. In the years 1906-1910, he produced least 30 paintings for Warwick Bro’s & Rutter, Limited of Toronto for reproduction as postcards.

In 1904, he began to work at the Central Ontario School of Art and Design (later the Ontario. College of Art) (OCAD U) and remained on its staff until 1924 when he died. Among his students was C. W. Jefferys. He was a member of the Ontario Society of Artists (O.S.A. 1876-1879, 1889-1924)) and the Royal Canadian Academy (A.R.C.A. 1890) and showed his work at the Academy often (1890-1922), usually watercolours and with the Art Association of Montreal (1889-1918). He became President of the O.S.A. in 1903, as well as a founding member of the Graphic Arts Club (1903) and a member of the Associated Watercolour Painters, Toronto (1912), along with Frederic Marlett Bell-Smith, Frederick Henry (Fred) Brigden, Robert Ford Gagen, T.G. Greene, C.W. Jefferys, John David Kelly, J. Ernest Sampson, Georges Chavignaud and George Agnew Reid.

In the Edward P. Taylor Library & Archives, Art Gallery of Ontario is a book inscribed on the front endpaper "Notes: various / C.M. Manly, Toronto" (1855) as well as Manley's biographical questionnaire from 1912.

== Selected public collections ==
- Agnes Etherington Art Centre, Queen’s Univ., Kingston, Ont.;
- Art Gallery of Ontario, Toronto; (Willows, 1889)
- National Gallery of Canada, Ottawa; (3 works -Autumn Landscape, 1898; Evening on the Conestogo, 1908; Pierrette, 1917)
- OCAD University, art gallery collection, large amount of graphic material;
- Ontario Government, Tor.;

== Selected exhibitions ==
- C. M. Manly, A.R.C.A., 1855-1924; Cobourg Art Gallery in cooperation with the Ontario College of Art, 1973.

== Awards ==
- Art Association of Montreal, Honourable Mention, 1894;
- Pan American Exposition, Honourable Mention, 1901;
- Montreal Spring Exhibition, Jessie Dow Prize, 1911
