= Fred S. Haines =

Canadian artist (1879–1960)

- Born: Frederick Stanley Haines; 29 March 1879; Meaford, Ontario
- Died: 21 November 1960 (aged 81); Thornhill, Ontario
- Known for: painter

Frederick Stanley Haines RCA (29 March 1879 in Meaford, Ontario – 21 November 1960 in Thornhill, Ontario), more commonly known as Fred S. Haines, was a Canadian painter. An accomplished and versatile artist, he is well known for his watercolours, oil paintings, gouaches, engravings and prints. He was a colleague and friend of the Group of Seven.

== Career ==
Born in Meaford, he studied at the Central Ontario School of Art. He continued his art studies in Europe at the Academie Royale, in Antwerp, Belgium, where he was awarded a gold medal for figure painting. He returned to Toronto in 1914 and apparently a disciple of John Wesley Cotton, made engravings and aquatints.

He was a founding member of the Society of Canadian Painter-Etchers and Engravers in 1916, the president of the Ontario Society of Artists in 1924 (elected a member in 1906), a founding member of the Canadian Society of Painters in Water Colour in 1925, and a full member in 1933 and from 1939 to 1942, the president of the Royal Canadian Academy of Arts. In 1928, Haines was appointed Curator at the Art Gallery of Toronto where he remained until his appointment as Principal of the Ontario College of Art in 1932. He retired from teaching in 1951. After his death in 1960, an exhibition of his work was held at the Art Gallery of Toronto.

His work is in the permanent collections of the National Gallery of Canada and elsewhere.

William E. Coutts, owner of the Coutts Company and a great supporter of the arts in Canada, commissioned 26 artists, including Haines, to design greeting cards as a means of increasing interest in Canadian art. The cards were produced between 1926 and 1931 as serigraphs and as reproductive prints. He also did prints for Sampson-Matthews.

The Town of Meaford hosted an exhibition from 10 September to 30 September 2010 which honoured his memory on the 50th anniversary of his death.

== Signature ==
He signed his artwork Fred. S. Haines.

== Notes ==
Cultural offices
Preceded by Wylie Grier	President of the Royal Canadian Academy of Arts; 1939-1942	Succeeded by Percy Erskine Nobbs, acting
