= André Lapine =

Canadian painter

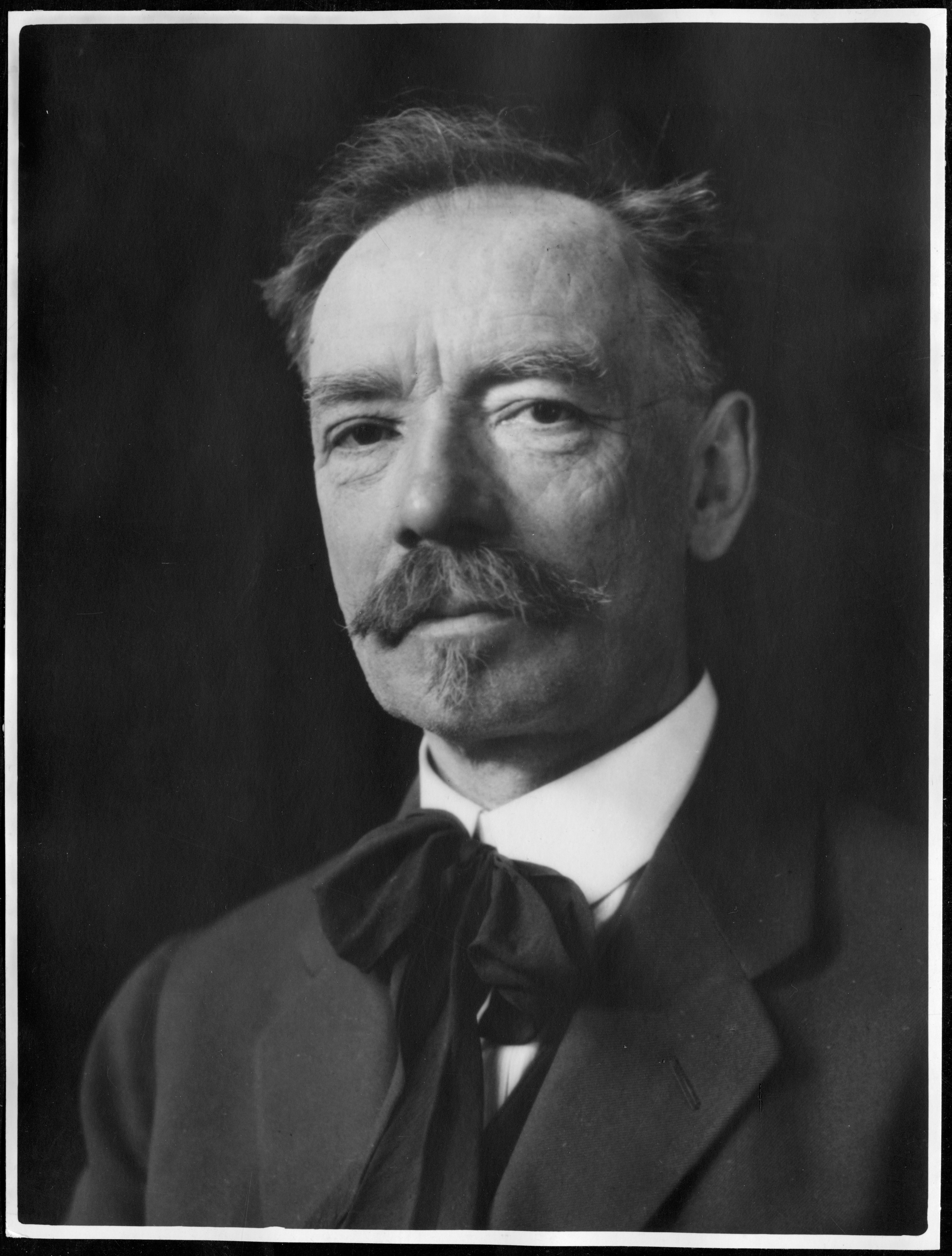
- Lapine in 1930
- Born: (born Andrejs Lapins) Andreas Christian Gottfried (André) Lapine; 15 (Julian) / 27 (Gregorian) October 1866, Skujene; Governorate of Livonia of the Russian Empire, in what is now Latvia
- Died: 26 February 1952; Minden, Ontario
- Education: Imperial Academy of Arts in Saint Petersburg; Royal Academy of Amsterdam night school, studying with Professor August Allebé
- Spouse: Collumbiena Geertruida Britt (m. 1897)

Andreas Christian Gottfried (André) Lapine RCA (15 (Julian) / 27 (Gregorian) October 1866, Skujene – 26 February 1952, Minden, Ontario) was a Latvian-born Canadian painter noted for his accurate depictions of horses as well as landscapes and portraits.

== Biography ==
Born in the Governorate of Livonia of the Russian Empire, in what is now Latvia, Lapine spent 20 years as an artist in the Netherlands, before emigrating to Canada in 1905, where he became especially renowned for his depictions of horses.

Lapine was the son of Natalia Julia Krebs and Johan Lapine, a general contractor in the town of Schuen. He began his art training at a young age under the tutelage of M. Rose (of the Imperial Academy of Arts in Saint Petersburg). Rose noted Lapine's exceptional talent and, in 1882, invited him to tour Europe's foremost galleries to further his art studies.

After six months, Lapine separated from his instructor and took up a studio with Josef Weiss. Unable to make a decent living as a painter, Weiss finally gave up art altogether and headed for America. Lapine himself left Paris but continued with painting, traveling from Verdun to Alsace-Lorraine, then to Belgium, and finally in 1885 to Amsterdam. There he studied at the Royal Academy of Amsterdam night school, with Professor August Allebé. He became a member of the St Lucas Art Society.

During this time, Lapine met Collumbiena Geertruida Britt from Norg whom he married at the age of 31 in August 1897 in Amsterdam. Despite his long stay in the Netherlands, Lapine remained a Russian subject. In 1905, the Lapines emigrated to Canada, staking out land in Manitoba. They moved to Toronto in 1907, where at the age of 40 Lapine began working with Fred Brigden at the Toronto Engraving Co, which changed its name to Brigden's Ltd.

An exceptional artist, André Lapine had the ability to capture an image with simple, strong strokes - as is clearly illustrated in his sketches - indicating a skilled artist who had mastered the basic techniques of drawing. Lapine's technical instructions, in the academic sense of art, during his training in Europe, are the fundamental basis for his success as an artist. A profile, which accompanied an exhibition of his work held at Malloney's Art Gallery in Toronto, stated: "Lapine perfected his skill as a draftsman. He recalls lessons with an early master when he drew and re-drew a single subject for three consecutive months. What's the use, he reportedly said, of a painter offering his 'impression' to anyone unless he can really Paint?" This attention to detail and perfection established Lapine as the best illustrator of horses in North America. He went so far as to create a formula, which gives step-by-step instructions of how to draw a horse in proportion.

Lapin's work frequently was seen on the covers of the Toronto Star Weekly and in colour sections within that publication. He became a member of the Ontario Society of Artists in 1909. He resigned in 1910, and was re-elected in 1922, and remained until 1938. Lapine was also a member of the Graphic Arts Club, the Toronto Arts and Letters Club and a founding member of the Canadian Society of Painters in Water Colour. In 1919, Lapine was elected to the Royal Canadian Academy of Arts. His work was selected and purchased by the National Gallery of Canada as well as the Art Gallery of Ontario.

In 1934, Lapine was struck by a car in Toronto. His injuries were severe and it appeared unlikely he would survive. Medical bills began piling up. The Mail & Empire carried the following account of the accident: "The rather small painter, who excels in the delineation of horses, was crossing the highway near his home two weeks ago. He saw an auto coming from one direction, stepped backward and was knocked down by another car traveling in the opposite direction". Almost a month later the Star Weekly announced that a committee had been formed; headed by Sir Edmund Wyly Grier, to organize a sale of paintings, contributed by artists in Ontario, to help pay for Lapine's medical bills. The showing took place at the T. Eaton Company Fine Art Galleries and the Robert Simpson Co. under the patronage of His Honour, the Lieutenant-Governor and Mrs. Bruce and forty-one distinguished families including: Lady Baillie; Lady Eaton; Hon. Vincent and Mrs. Massy; Mrs. Lawren Harris; Col. and Mrs. J.B. MacLean; Mr. & Mrs. A. H. Robson; Dr. and Mrs Sigmund Samuel. Lapine eventually recovered and returned to his easel. The Lapines moved to Minden in the 1940s where André continued to paint. He died in 1952 and is buried with his wife in the Minden Cemetery.

Lapine's death was noted in many Ontario newspapers. It was Pearl McCarthy, however, who wrote much about Lapine during his time on the Toronto art scene and nicknamed the 'gentle cavalier', who best described Lapine in her article in the Globe and Mail, "André Lapine, the artist, died yesterday. As this smiling but gentle cavalier from an earlier era passed from the scene, Toronto art circles lost one of their most picturesque links with past ways."

Today, Lapine's work is in many private and public collections including the Agnes Jamieson Gallery located in Minden, Ontario Canada. The Agnes Jamison Gallery opened in 1981 to show case 41 Lapine paintings that were bequeathed to the Minden township by Frank Welch, a resident of the area. The Agnes Jamieson Gallery now houses over 100 of Lapine's works in their permanent collection.
