= Alfred Howard =

Alfred Howard may refer to:

- Alfred Taylor Howard (1868–1948), bishop of the Church of the United Brethren in Christ
- Alfred H. Howard (1854–1916), British-born artist in Toronto, Ontario

== See also ==
- Alf Howard (1906–2010), Australian scientist, educator and explorer
