= Bruce, Canada =

Bruce, Canada may refer to:

- Bruce, Alberta, a hamlet in Alberta, Canada within Beaver County
- Bruce County, Ontario, a county in Southwestern Ontario, Canada
- Bruce (Ontario provincial electoral district), a provincial riding in Ontario, Canada (1934-1967 & 1987–1999)

== See also ==
- Bruce—Grey—Owen Sound, a federal electoral district in Ontario, Canada
- South Bruce, Ontario, a municipality in Bruce County, Ontario, Canada
- South Bruce Peninsula, a town at the base of the Bruce Peninsula of Ontario, Canada, in Bruce County between Lake Huron and Georgian Bay
