= Walter R. Duff =

Canadian artist (1879-1967)

- Born: Walter Raymond Duff; May 3, 1879; Hamilton, Ontario
- Died: September 1, 1967 (aged 88); Toronto, Ontario, Canada
- Education: Hamilton Art School; the Art Students' League, New York (1899-1902); the Polytechnic Institute, London, England

Walter R. Duff (May 05, 1879 – September 01, 1967) was a Canadian graphic artist and painter who worked in oil and watercolour. His subjects include portraits, buildings, still life and landscapes.

== Career ==
Duff was born in Hamilton, Ontario, in 1879 and studied at the Hamilton Art School, the Art Students' League in New York City (1899–1902), and the Polytechnic Institute in London, England. He worked as a commercial artist for the Toronto Engraving Co. (1904). He was Manager of the Commercial Art Company, Toronto (1905–1907); worked for the Advertising Designers Ltd., Toronto. (1911–1915), and for The Mortimer Ltd.

== Work ==
Duff was a printmaker, water colourist, painter, ceramist (he decorated plates) and cabinet-maker. During his years in Canada he painted oil paintings and watercolours of Georgian Bay, Haliburton and Algonquin Park. In 1916, he had a sale of his portrait etchings with a catalogue in his studio. The catalogue had a text written by Barton Hamilton and was published under the auspices of the Niello Guild. At the outbreak of World War I, he joined the Canadian Medical Corp as a private soldier. He was stationed at Orpington Hospital in England where his knowledge of anatomy and handling of sculptural materials was of help to the plastic surgeons doing repair work for the wounded soldiers, especially facial injuries. He was soon promoted to Lieutenant and then Captain. His work was later sent to the archives of the Royal College of Surgeons and Physicians of England. In 1919, he exhibited two plaster busts, one of himself, with the Royal Canadian Academy. After the First World War, he lived in Montreal (c. 1920–1925), then in 1930, moved to Douglaston, New York and married. Much of his later career was spent in New York. He returned to Canada, to Toronto in 1963, after his wife died. He died in Toronto at the age of 88. In 1968, the article Walter R. Duff, Versatile Artist-designer was published in The Auctioneer in Toronto. Afterwards, an auction was held of his art at Ward-Price Auction House on College Street in 1968.

He is represented in the National Gallery of Canada by six works, all etchings (three portraits, three landscapes) and was included in the National Gallery of Canada's major book on Lithography, The Stone Age: Lithography from its Beginnings. His art work also is in the Art Gallery of Guelph and Art Gallery of Sudbury.

He was a founding member of the Graphic Arts Club in Canada in 1904, the year it was founded (it became the Canadian Society of Graphic Art) and he was included in a photograph of the Graphic Arts Club, Circa 1903–1904, which shows him standing, along with J. W. Beatty (Colgate Papers, Ontario Archives, Toronto). His other affiliations included: Salmagundi Club, New York (1916); Chelsea Arts Club, London (1917); and Society of Canadian Painter-Etchers and Engravers (1916), among others.
