= William Daniel Blatchly =

English painter and illustrator (1835–1903)

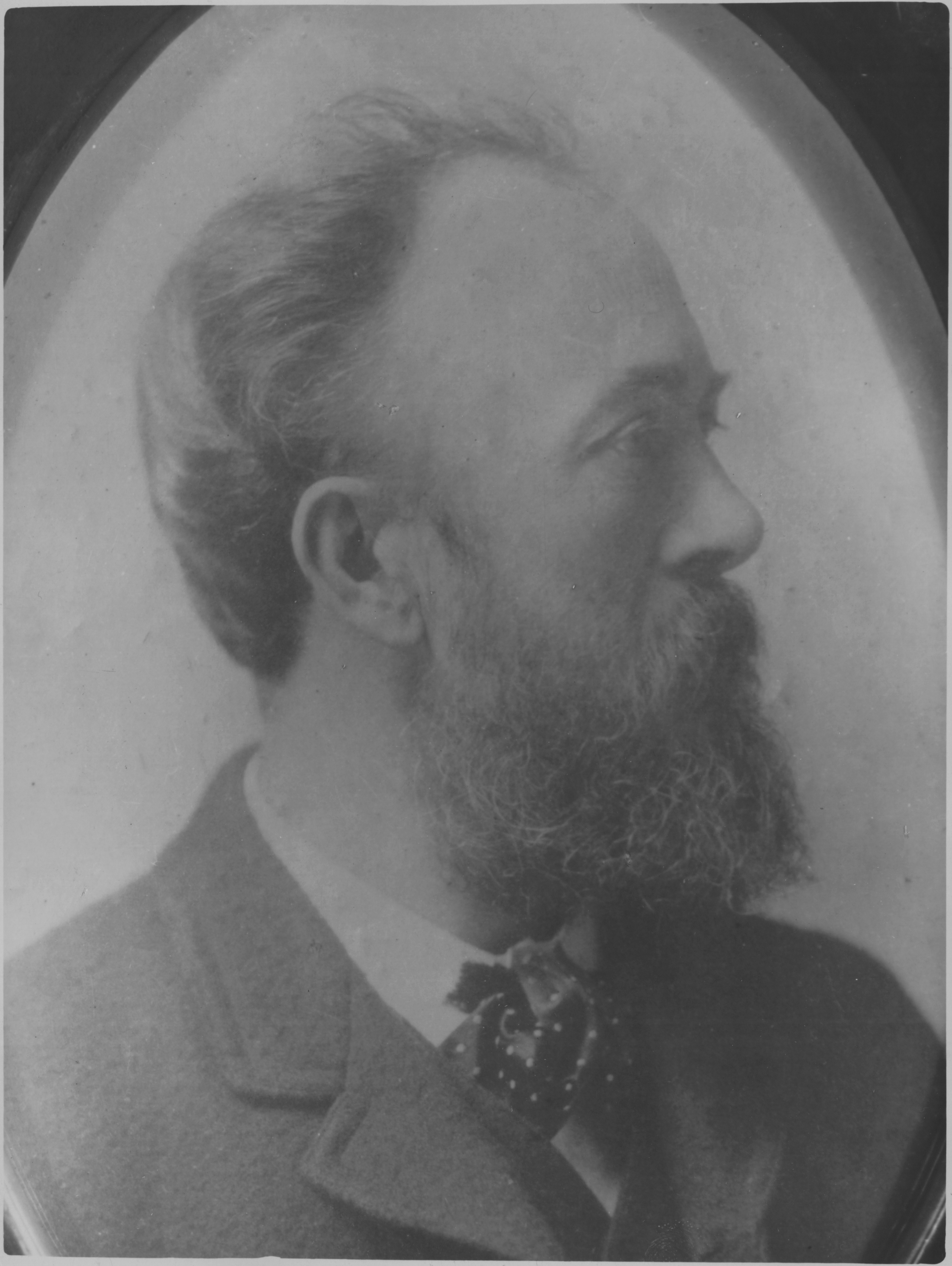
- Born: 1835; Bristol, England
- Died: 1903; Toronto, Ontario
- Known for: lithographer and painter, artist-illustrator

William Daniel Blatchly who signed his name as W. D. Blatchly (1835–1903) was a British lithographer, painter and illustrator.

== Career ==
Blatchly was born in Bristol, England. He worked for the illustrated magazine Punch in London where, in 1877, he transformed several of Charles Decimus Barraud's watercolours into chromolithographs for publication.

In 1881 he emigrated to Canada, settling in Toronto. He worked for Rolph, Smith & Co. in 1884 and for the Toronto Lithographing Company, known as Canada's largest and most advanced lithograph company from 1885 to 1889. He then may have worked in the United States. A drawing of him at work at the Toronto Lithographing Company by his colleague C. W. Jefferys is in the National Gallery of Canada. In 1885, he illustrated The white stone canoe: a legend of the Ottawas by James D. Edgar (Toronto News Company).

Blatchly is perhaps best known for his chromolithographic renderings of North West Rebellion battle-scene sketches such as the Capture of Batoche by F.W. Curzon, "Special Artist" of the Canadian Pictorial and Illustrated War News, which were published by Grip P. & P. Co. and the Toronto Lithography Company in 1885.

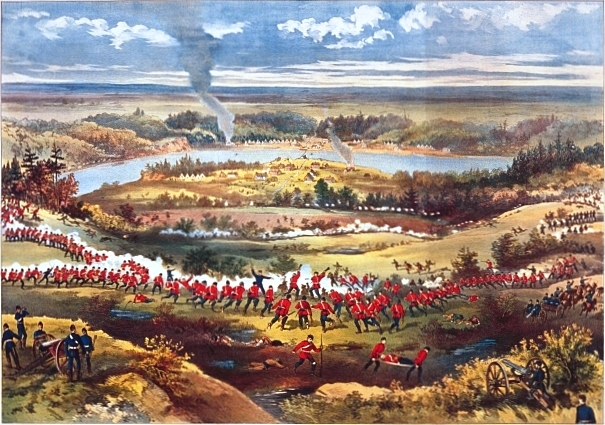
The Capture of Batoche

He was elected the first president of the Toronto Art Students' League (1886–1904) and held the post till 1890, and contributed prolifically to the League Calendars (1893–1904). He was included In the Toronto Art Students' League winter exhibition of 1899. His works in the show were favorably reviewed by Toronto Saturday Night, one even being called "a pleasing pleasure" by the reviewer.

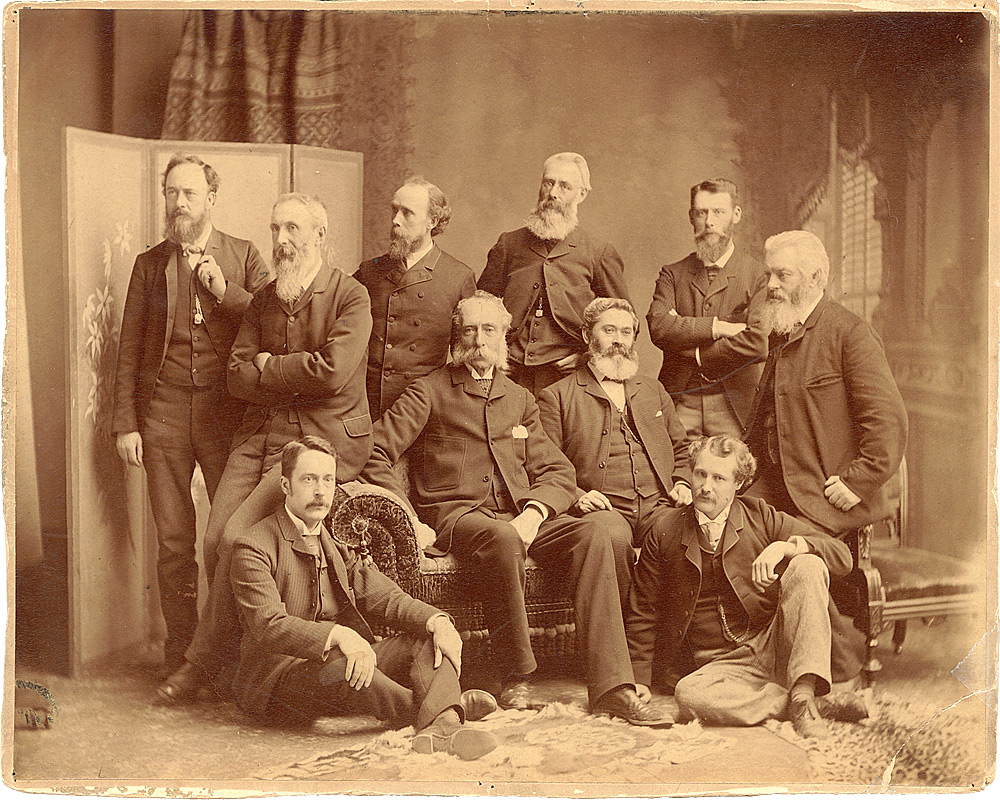
OntarioSocietyofArtistsMembers1889

He exhibited his work at the Ontario Society of Artists in Toronto and was elected a member in 1885, remaining one until his death in 1903. He is shown standing first on the left in a photograph of OSA members in 1889. He was also a member of the Mahlstock Club (1891). He exhibited his work as well at the Royal Canadian Academy of Arts (1885–1903).

The Amon Carter Museum of American Art Fort Worth, Texas, the McCord Museum, Montreal and the Ontario Government Collection, Toronto have his work in their collections.

He died in Toronto in 1903. Blatchly's work in the Toronto Art League Calendars was included in a show about the calendars at the National Gallery of Canada library and archives in 2008, curated by Charles C. Hill.
