= Simone Hudon-Beaulac =

Canadian painter and printmaker

Simone Hudon
- Born: Simone Marie Yvette Hudon; September 9, 1905; Quebec City, Quebec, Canada
- Died: August 5, 1984 (aged 78); Montreal, Quebec, Canada
- Known for: Painter

Simone Hudon (9 September 1905 – 5 August 1984) was a Canadian painter and printmaker known for her printmaking practice and teaching career in Quebec City.

== Early life ==
Born Simone Marie Yvette Hudon in Quebec City, she studied at the École des Beaux-Arts in her native city, graduating in 1931 after study with Lucien Martial and Henry Ivan Neilson (1865–1931). Simone contributed to Quebec City's revival of printmaking.

== Career ==
She succeeded Neilson in 1931, and taught engraving, perspective, interior design and illustration until 1945. She moved to Montreal in 1945 and worked there as a book illustrator. She won numerous awards during her career, and was exhibited widely, notably with Sylvia Daoust. She was a member of the Society of Canadian Painter-Etchers and Engravers. A member of the Canadian Society of Graphic Art, she illustrated the book Au fil des côtes de Québec published by the Government of Quebec in 1967 for the Canadian centennial in 1967. Hudon was selected to represent Quebec of the exhibition Contemporary Art of the Western Hemisphere, which travelled to the Cleveland Museum of Art in Cleveland, Ohio 8 December 1942 – 10 January 1943.

One of her students was Louise Carrier who also became widely known for her artistry.

== Collections ==
Her work is included in the collection of the Musée national des beaux-arts du Québec.
