= Caven Atkins =

Canadian artist (1907–2000)

- Born: Ernest Caven Atkins; 1907; London, Ontario
- Died: 22 December 2000 (aged 92–93); Birmingham, Michigan, U.S.
- Education: Meyer Both Commercial Art School, Chicago (1924); Winnipeg School of Art (1925–1928) with Lionel LeMoine FitzGerald
- Spouse: May Pepper

Caven Atkins (1907–2000) was a Canadian figurative and landscape painter.

== Early years ==
Born in London, Ontario, Caven Atkins was raised in Manitoba and Saskatchewan. From 1925 to 1928 he studied with Lionel LeMoine FitzGerald at the Winnipeg School of Art. After graduation, Atkins worked at Brigden's commercial art firm, where he met Bertram Brooker and Charles Comfort. Atkins later became friends with Fritz Brandtner, who introduced him to German expressionism.

== Career ==
From 1930 to 1934, he was an instructor at the Winnipeg School of Art. He taught painting at Queen’s University summer school in 1943 and at the Ontario College of Art in 1945. Other teaching positions he held included the appointments at the University of Toronto, Central Technical School and elsewhere. While teaching at the Ontario College of Art in 1945, he wrote an article for Canadian Art magazine on using different media.

Atkins was not selected to be an official war artist, but he was determined to be in the war effort. He recorded day and night scenes of the activity in the Toronto Shipbuilding Company in a painting and 24 drawings he made in 1942. These he donated to the National Gallery of Canada in 1951 (they subsequently became part of the war art collection prior to their transfer to the Canadian War Museum in 1971), where they were acknowledged because of their home front subject matter.

Like many artists, Atkins found employment in the immediate post-war period difficult to find. In 1945, he moved to Birmingham, Michigan where he worked as an illustrator and designer for the Ford Motor Company until he retired. Atkins never returned to live in Canada. He died in Birmingham, Michigan 22 December 2000 at the age of 93.

== Selected exhibitions ==
Atkins had a retrospective of his watercolours at Hart House (now part of the Art Museum of Toronto) in 1945. In 1979, the Art Gallery of Windsor curated a survey by curator Ted Fraser, titled A Retrospective Exhibition of Selected Works by Caven Atkins Spanning Fifty Years of the Artist's Life. In 1987, the Art Gallery of Windsor organized the circulating exhibition Caven Atkins: the Winnipeg years curated by Ted Fraser.

== Selected collections ==
His work is included in the National Gallery of Canada, the Canadian War Museum, the Art Gallery of Algoma, the Art Gallery of Ontario, the Art Gallery of Windsor (56 works) the Beaverbrook Art Gallery, Fredericton and the Remai Modern, Saskatoon.

== Memberships ==
Atkins belonged to the Manitoba Society of Artists, the Canadian Group of Painters (1941-1943); Canadian Society of Graphic Art (1941-1943); and the Canadian Society of Painters in Water Colour (1943-1945) (he was president of the latter two societies). He also belonged to Ontario Association of Teachers of Art (1944-1945).
