= Robert Holmes (artist) =

Canadian artist (1861-1930)

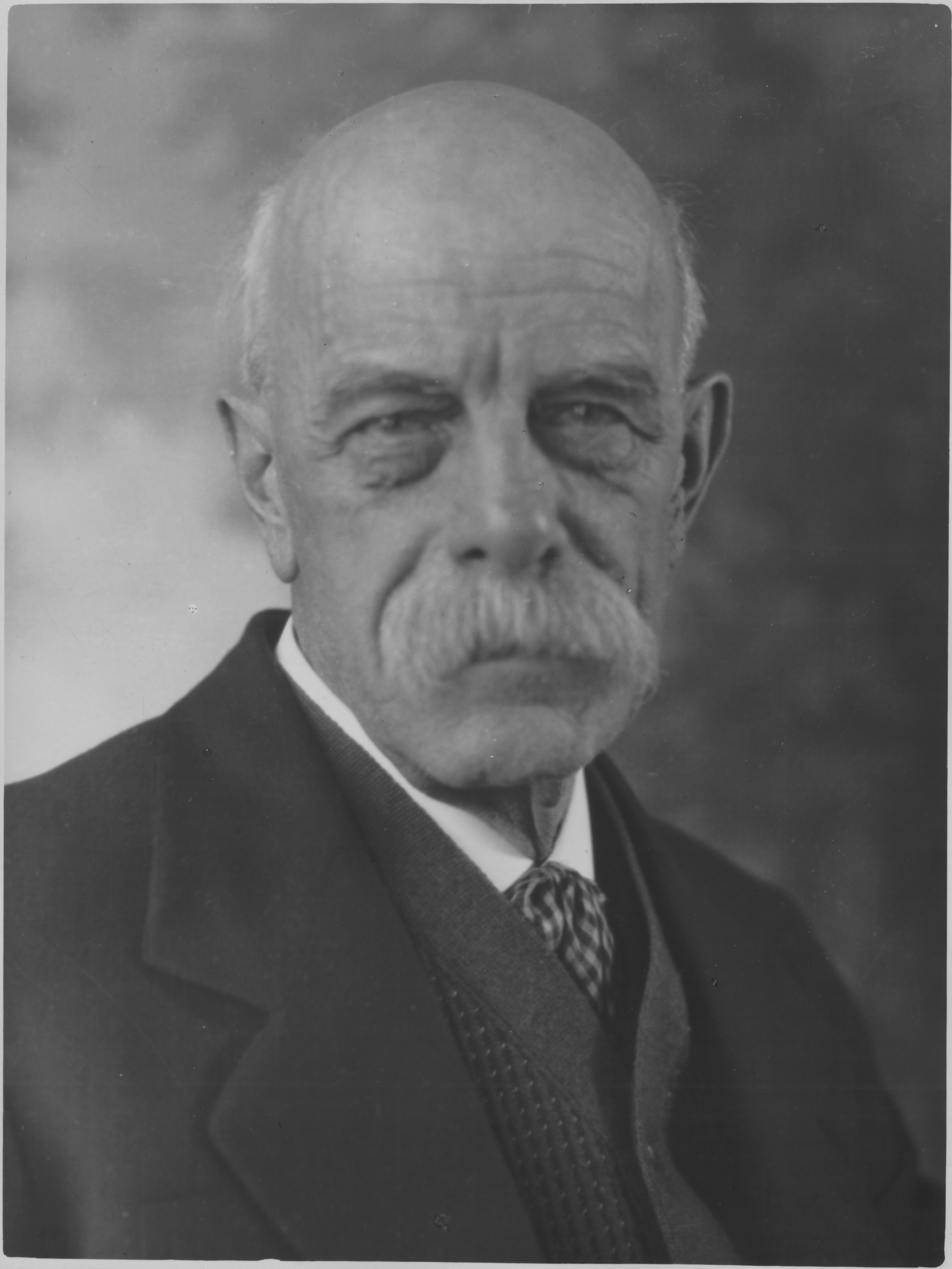
- Born: Robert H. Holmes; 1861; Cannington, Ontario, Canada
- Died: May 1930 (aged 68–69); Toronto, Ontario, Canada
- Education: Toronto Art School with William Cruikshank and received certificates from the school in 1883 and 1884; then studied in London, England, at the Royal College of Art with A.B. Piet, W.R. Lethalay and Gerald Moira. On his return to North America, he was a student at the University of New York.
- Elected: Toronto Art Students' League (1890 - Pres. 1891–1904); the Mahlstick Club (1899–1903); the Graphics Arts Club (1904 - Pres. 1909–1911); the Arts and Letters Club, Toronto (1908); the Ontario Society of Artists (1909 - Pres. 1919–1923); Royal Canadian Academy (A.R.C.A. 1909 – R.C.A. 1921)

Robert Holmes RCA (1861 – May 1930), was a Canadian naturalist painter and artist-illustrator.

== Biography ==
Robert Holmes, born in Cannington, Ontario developed his skill in drawing as a youngster but his father, a blacksmith with six children, wanted him to become a doctor or teacher with a more secure means of a livelihood. Even without his father's support, he became a student at the Toronto Art School, studying with William Cruikshank and received certificates from the school in 1883 and 1884. Upon graduation, he took up designing in fabrics and interior decorating and to further these branches of study he attended the Royal College of Art in South Kensington in London, England with A.B. Piet, W.R. Lethalay and Gerald Moira. On his return to North America, he was a student at New York University.

When he returned to Canada, he taught art in various schools in Ontario and finally settled as resident master and teacher of drawing at Upper Canada College (then King Street), Toronto, where he taught for thirty years and became a good friend of Stephen Leacock who was also a resident master. He also taught at St. Andrew's College and for a while at the Toronto Art School where he had been a pupil. From 1912 until his death in 1930, he was on the staff of the Ontario College of Art OCAD (head, department of design, and later, lecturer in the history of art and head of the department of elementary art).

He became interested in painting flowers when he wanted to teach students a project that involved a characteristically Canadian subject in design classes and found that flowers lend themselves to this purpose. To paint them, he travelled by bicycle to various parts of the country including Three Rivers, Quebec. In 1904, with William Walker Alexander, he sketched in Algonquin Park in a canoe, being among the first Toronto artists to discover and sketch in the Park.

Holmes meticulously painted in watercolour over a hundred varieties of wild flowers and did intimate studies of the same flower in each of the four seasons. He always painted them in their natural surroundings. During his lifetime, Holmes's work was exhibited in museums across North America and since then, his work has been hung sporadically in the Art Gallery of Ontario. He also did illustrations, such as the ones he contributed to the Toronto Art Students' League Calendars or the six coloured illustrations he supplied for S.T. Wood's Rambles of a Canadian Naturalist (1916).

During his career he was active with many groups and societies including: the Toronto Art Students' League (1890 - Pres. 1891–1904); the Mahlstick Club (1899–1903); the Graphics Arts Club (1904 - Pres. 1909–1911); the Arts and Letters Club, Toronto (1908); the Ontario Society of Artists (1909 - Pres. 1919–1923); the Royal Canadian Academy (A.R.C.A. 1909 – R.C.A. 1921). He was the oldest faculty member at the Ontario College of Art when he died suddenly of a heart attack while addressing the students of the College at the Arts and Letters Club, Toronto. His watercolour paintings (more than 30 in number) were purchased by the Art Gallery of Toronto from his estate by subscription. He is also represented in the collection of the National Gallery of Canada. His library was gifted to the Ontario College of Art. Among his books was The Art of Gerald Moira, one of his teachers in England, by Harold Watkins.

A stone plaque to his memory is today located in the Guild Park in Scarborough, Ontario. A historical plaque was also placed in MacLeod Park, Cannington, 1967, in memory of Holmes.

== Bibliography ==
- Drawings, watercolours and design studies by Robert Holmes / arranged by the Art Gallery of Cobourg in co-operation with the Ontario College of Art. Cobourg and Toronto: Art Gallery of Cobourg and the Ontario College of Art. 1974.
