= Michael Forster (artist) =

Canadian abstract painter (1907–2002)

- Born: Michael Francis Forster; May 4, 1907; Kolkata, India
- Died: July 4, 2002 (aged 95); Treen in Porthcurno, Cornwall, UK
- Education: William Roberts; Bernard Meninsky
- Known for: Abstract painting
- Title: Official war artist
- Movement: Surrealism
- Spouse: Adele Davis

Michael Forster (1907–2002) was an Anglo-Canadian abstract artist. Born in Kolkata, India, Forster spent most of his childhood in Meerut. He studied first at Lancing College in Sussex and then later at the Central School of Arts and Crafts (now Central St. Martins – University of the Arts), as well as the Académie Colarossi in Paris. In 1927–1928, he moved to Toronto, Ontario, Canada in hopes of avoiding The Great Depression.

His abstract paintings were created exclusively with acrylics and acrylic polymers, and his work is heavily influenced by the Surrealist movement. In fact, Forster claimed that he never planned any of his compositions, but rather that they were created according to the demands of his subconscious. Canadian art critic Paul Duval deemed him "Canada's pioneer surrealist."

As a painter, Forster wanted to embody the transference of light and the patterns of nature into instinctive abstract forms. Following in the footsteps of John Constable, he took great inspiration from the ever-changing light and cloud formations of the sky.

== Childhood and education ==
Forster was born in 1907 in Kolkata (then called Calcutta). Michael Forster spent much of his childhood in the Northern Indian city of Meerut, a land situated in the vast flatness of the Ganges plain. Meerut served as a dramatic visual contrast for Forster, a place of great personal tragedy and loss. His father, Edward Fulham, was a civil servant who died when Forster was seven. His mother, Augusta Fulham, and her lover, Lt Henry Clarke, were tried and convicted for Edward's murder in March 1913. Clark was hanged while the pregnant Mrs Fulham was sentenced to life imprisonment and died of heat stroke the following year.

Forster's English relatives enrolled him at Calcutta's La Martinière School until 1921. He then attended Lancing College in Sussex, England. After graduation, he took classes with William Roberts and Bernard Meninsky at London's Central School of Arts and Crafts, as well as additional classes at the Académie Colarossi in Paris.

From 1927 to 1928, in the hope that the Depression would be less bitter in North America than in England, Forster travelled to Toronto.

== Early career ==
The effects of the economic depression in Europe discouraged Forster from pursuing an artistic career in France or England, so he emigrated to Canada. He arrived in Toronto in 1928 and found work as a freelance illustrator and commercial artist. He exhibited at Toronto's Picture Loan Society in 1938. Also in 1938, he saw a Surrealist exhibition curated by Herbert Read and Roland Penrose in Toronto which profoundly affected his artistic style.

The 1938 Surrealist section of the Canadian National Exhibition deeply impacted Forster's art. The movement's emphasis on the unconscious life influenced Forster's intuitive and sensual handling of paint. After the war, he became familiar with Jean-Paul Riopelle and the Canadian Automatistes, as well as Diego Rivera and Rufino Tamayo in Mexico City. He was honoured with a one-man show at the Museo Nacional in Mexico City in 1960 before returning to Canada four years later.

The following year his work was chosen by the Canadian Society of Graphic Art (CSGA) in their selection for the World's Fair in New York.

Forster later joined the Canadian Society of Graphic Art, as well as the Canadian Society of Painters in Watercolours (CSPW), and in 1943 was included in "Four Canadian Painters", an exhibition of non-objective art at the Art Gallery of Toronto.

In the spring of 1943, Forster, along with fourteen other people in Canada, was selected to be an Official Second World War artist. He spent the summer of 1944 on a merchant marine ship outside Halifax; later that year, he joined the Royal Canadian Navy Volunteer Reserve. Most of his work as a war artist was painted in his studio using photographs he had taken during his travels.

== Later career ==
After World War II, Forster married Adele Davis, and moved to Montreal, Quebec, Canada. In 1949, he began writing the weekly art review in the Montreal Standard, as well as several articles advocating Montreal artists, particularly the Automatistes.

During the early 1950s, he exhibited in group shows at the Montreal Museum of Fine Arts, and his watercolours were singled out for their technical command.

In 1952, he moved to Mexico City, Mexico. He mounted a solo show in November 1954 at the Galeria Proteo, one of the city's leading commercial galleries. In a review of the exhibition, Spanish feminist writer Margarita Nelken praised Forster's sense of poetry and emotion. Years later, the Museo Nacional de Arte Moderno "Carlos Mérida" hosted a major exhibition of his work with a catalogue foreword written by art historian Paul Westheim.

The Forsters moved back to Ottawa in 1963. While there, he had a solo show at the Picture Loan Society. Two years later, he held a show of new work at the Robertson Galleries, prompting art critic Carl Weiselberger to write: "The supremacy of colour is one of the characteristic qualities of Michael Forster."

In 1974, Adele died of cancer. Forster expressed his grief in a series of works, fifteen of which were exhibited the following year at the Damkjar-Burton Gallery, in Hamilton, Canada. That same year, he left Canada permanently for England, retiring to Treen in Cornwall, where he died in 2002.
