= Louise Carrier =

Canadian artist (1925-1976)

- Born: 1925; Lévis, Quebec
- Died: December 26, 1976 (aged 50–51); Lévis, Quebec
- Occupation: Artist
- Spouse: André Garant
- Children: Three sons

Louise Carrier (1925–December 26, 1976) was a Canadian artist, known for her body of work including portraits, and for her commissions for the decoration of churches.

== Career ==
Carrier was a portrait painter (born in Lévis, Quebec) to two artists. She studied with Jean Paul Lemieux, Jean Dallaire and Simone Hudon and graduated from the Ecole des Beaux-Arts in Quebec City (1942-1946). During her studies she met the young painter and sculptor André Garant, also from Lévis. They were married on August 23, 1952 at Notre-Dame-de-Lévis church and went on to have three sons: Emmanuel, Jérôme and Sébastien.

She won several prizes at the Quebec Provincial Exhibitions. She also completed mosaics for the baptistry of Notre Dame Church in Lévis (1959), and The Way of the Cross painted for the chapel of the Grand Séminaire de Québec (1962). She exhibited in many group shows. Her work is included in the collections of the Musée national des beaux-arts du Québec and the National Gallery of Canada.

In 1961, Carrier presented some of her works in a book published by Éditions Thobie - collection du Grand Barbousse (Quebec) bringing together the work of four young Quebec artists, including Carrier.

Louise Carrier's collection of works includes oils, charcoal and red chalk drawings, as well as wash drawings. In 1967, the Musée du Québec (now the Musée national des beaux-arts du Québec) devoted an exhibition to her work.

Carrier received a grant to support her work from the Canada Council for the Arts in 1969. She died in 1976.

== The Louise-Carrier Exhibition Center ==
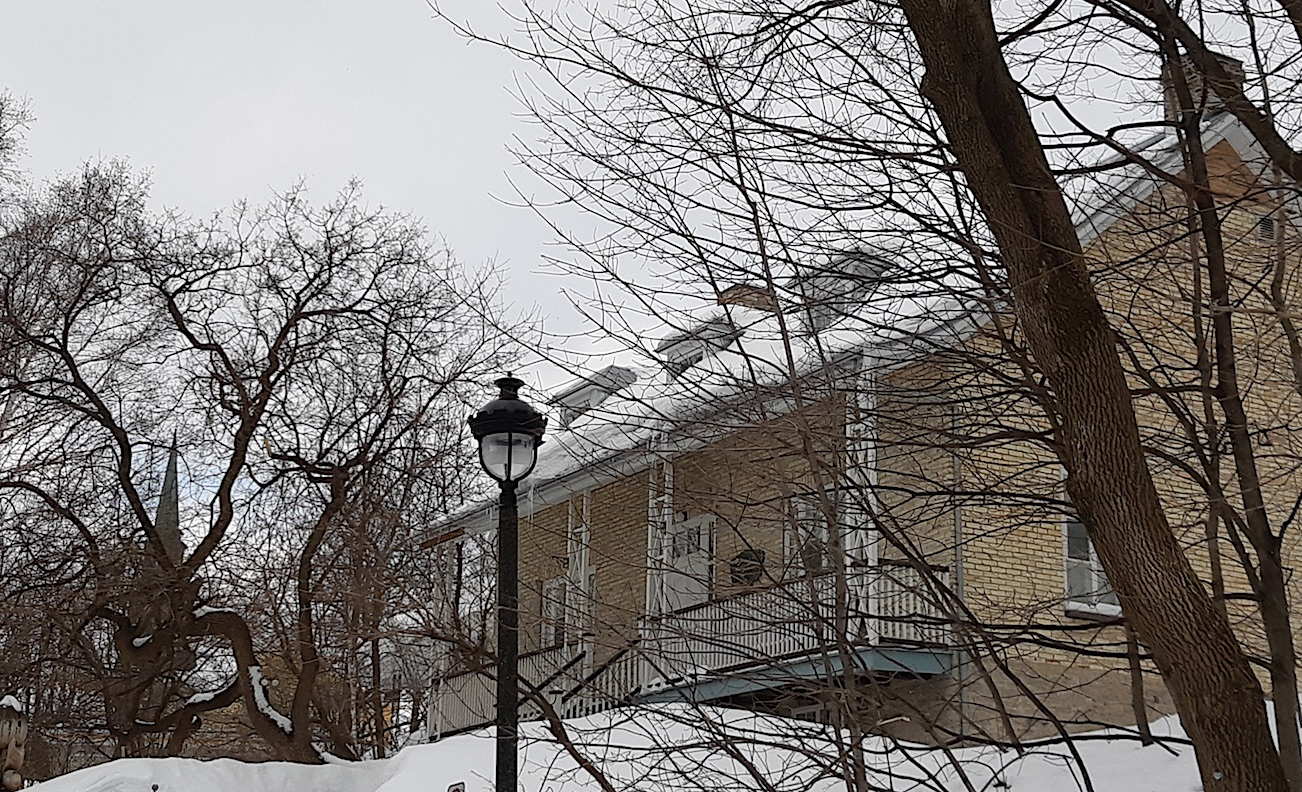
Louise-Carrier Exhibition Center: 33 rue Wolfe in Old Lévis.

The Center d'exposition Louise-Carrier is located in the former presbytery of the Anglican community of Lévis, just behind the performance hall L'Anglicane, which is housed in the former Holy Trinity Church, now deconsecrated. In 1963, the complex comprising presbytery and place of worship was rented out due to a sharp drop in the English-speaking presence in the area and Louise Carrier lived there.

The City of Lévis bought the entire site in 1973 and undertook to recycle it by giving it a cultural vocation. In 1978, a group of citizens and artists laid the foundations of the organization that today bears the name Diffusion culturelle de Lévis. Since then, the organization jointly manages the Louise-Carrier Exhibition Center as well as L'Anglicane.

== Legacy ==
Carrier's work has been included in the collections of the Musée national des beaux-arts du Québec, the National Gallery of Canada and the Winnipeg Art Gallery.

Since 1980, three retrospectives devoted to the work of Carrier have been held in Lévis and Montreal.
