= Jo Manning =

Canadian etcher, painter, and author (1923–2022)

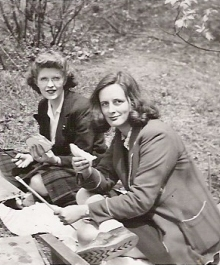
- Manning, holding brush, and OCA classmate Mary Ross c. 1947
- Born: Joanne Elizabeth Manning; December 10, 1923; Sidney, British Columbia, Canada
- Died: January 6, 2022 (aged 98)
- Occupations: Etcher, painter, author

Joanne Elizabeth Manning (December 10, 1923 – January 6, 2022) was a Canadian etcher, painter and author.

== Early life ==
Manning was born in Sidney, British Columbia, on December 10, 1923. She spent her early childhood on Vancouver Island, then moved to Amherstburg, Ontario. Manning studied at the Ontario College of Art in Toronto and graduated in 1945. She married, and became known as Jo Rothfels. Manning returned to the OCA in 1960 to study printmaking as a special student. She took up etching in 1962. After a divorce in 1971 she reverted to her maiden name. In 1971 she studied process camera techniques and color separation at George Brown College, Toronto.

== Later career ==
Manning taught in a mobile printmaking workshop between 1965 and 1970 for a community program of the Ontario Department of Education. She taught or ran workshops at Centennial College (1967–71) and Sheridan College (1971-74), and in the summer at Hockley Valley School of Art (1970–74), Elliot Lake (1970–72), University of Toronto (1975) and various other places. She became an executive member of the Canadian Society of Graphic Art and a member of the Canadian Society of Painter-Etchers and Engravers. The two organizations merged in 1976 to form the Print and Drawing Council of Canada. Jo Manning was a founding member of the new Council. Around 1980 she became ill from exposure to chemicals and moved away from etching into ink drawing and oil and watercolor painting.

After many years of creating works in different media, culminating in watercolour and graphite grasses and black ink tree trunks as detailed as her early etchings, Manning turned to writing, to document both the early print world in Canada, and her own personal journey as a woman artist. Her first book, A Printmaker's Memoir: A Personal History of an Era, was published in 2009. Manning chronicles "the past seventy years of printmaking in Canada" through the eyes of a young woman trying to find her place in the Canadian art world as a skilled artist and printmaker. Manning's second book, Etched in Time, published in 2016, expanded on the role of women artists in Canada. Etched in Time is a far more personal book, sharing mysteries within her own family, as well as her passage through the art world during World War II, "marriage, betrayal, divorce, and her own artistic career as one of Canada's foremost printmakers."

== Personal life and death ==
Manning resided at an assisted living facility near Beacon Hill Park, in Victoria, British Columbia toward the end of her life. She died by euthanasia on January 6, 2022, at the age of 98.

== Exhibitions and reception ==
Manning's work has been included in many group shows in North America, Europe and Australia. She has held a number of solo exhibitions including:

- Pollack Gallery, Toronto (1965, 1968)
- Gallery Pascal, Toronto (1974, 1977, 1980)
- Mira Godard Gallery, Montreal (1976)
- Earlscourt Gallery, Hamilton, Ontario (1979)
- Gadatsky Gallery, Toronto (1984)
- Bishop's University, Lennoxville, Quebec

Manning has won many awards including a gold medal at the 2nd Print Biennale (1970) in Florence, Italy, first prize at the 4th American Print Biennale (1970) in Santiago, Chile, and the medal of honor at the International Graphic Biennale (1980) in Frechen, Germany. Her work is held in many private, corporate and public collections including the National Gallery of Canada in Ottawa, Montreal Museum of Fine Arts, Art Gallery of Windsor and many others.
