= Simon-François Daumont de Saint-Lusson =

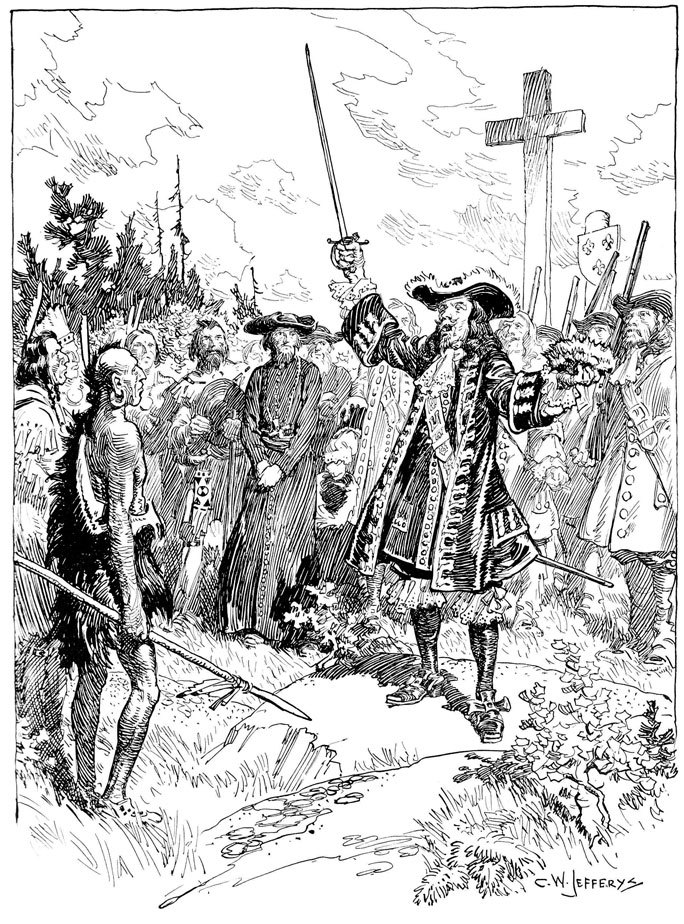
Simon-François Daumont de Saint-Lusson as illustrated by Charles William Jefferys

Simon-François Daumont de Saint-Lusson (French pronunciation: [simɔ̃ fʁɑ̃swa domɔ̃ də sɛ̃ lysɔ̃]; died after 1677) was a military officer of New France and deputy of Jean Talon. Saint-Lusson was sent to Sault Ste. Marie by Talon to claim Lakes Huron and Superior and all of the vast region "contiguous and adjacent there-unto, as well as discovered as to be discovered" which was "bounded on the one side by the Northern and Western Seas and on the other side by the South Sea including all its length and breadth" for Louis XIV at what was called "The Pageant of the Sault". Records indicate that about 2000 Native Americans; principal chiefs of the Sauks, Menomonees, Pottawattamies, Winnebagoes and thirteen other tribes were present. He symbolically raised his sword and a handful of dirt after the Te Deum was chanted while a huge cross with the escutcheon of France was erected followed by prayers and cried "Vive le roi." The Native Americans voluntarily submitted to the dominion of the majesty. French gifts were exchanged for fur pelts. It could be safe to assume that the Indians viewed the official claim of land and that all the people within its bounds now subjects of the king of France as an elaborate fur trade ritual.
