= The Picture Gallery of Canadian History =

1942–1950 three volume text

The Picture Gallery of Canadian History is a three volume pictorial history of Canada, written and illustrated by historical artist Charles William Jefferys. It was published by Ryerson Press; Volume 1: Discovery to 1763 was released in 1942, Volume 2: 1763 to 1830 in 1945, and Volume 3: 1830 to 1900 in 1950.

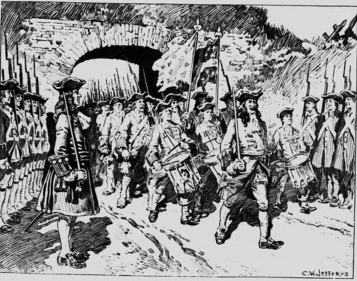
Evacuation of Port Royal, 1710 by CW Jefferys

The historical events and activities in the books were illustrated with more than 2,000 detailed pen-and-ink drawings. Jeffreys depicted a variety of topics, including adventure and exploration, pioneer life, industry, famous Canadians and military actions. Illustrations from the books have been reprinted in many school textbooks.

By 1970 The Picture Gallery of Canadian History was in its sixth printing.
