= Skujene Parish =

Parish of Latvia

- parish of Latvia
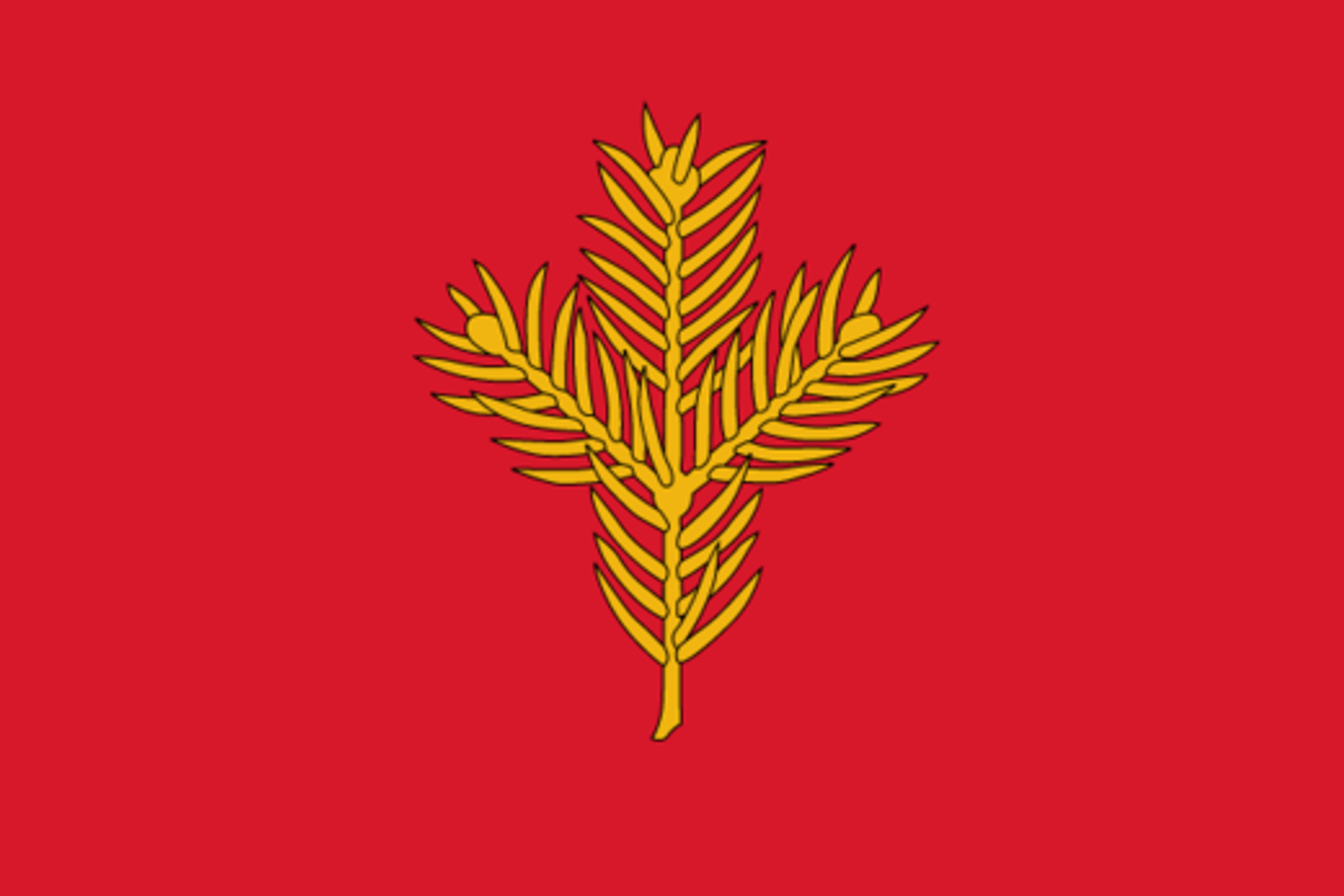
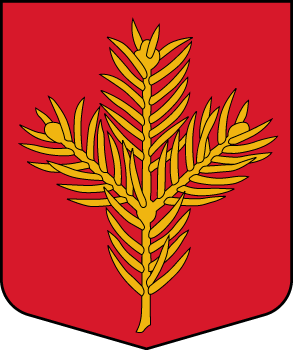
- Flag Coat of arms

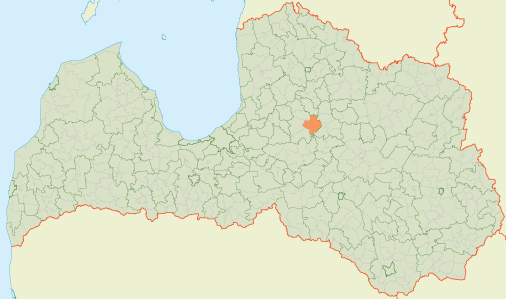
- 57°05′12″N 25°28′28″E

- Location within Latvia
- Country: Latvia

Area
  - Total: 180.26 km^{2} (69.60 sq mi)
  - Land: 176.31 km^{2} (68.07 sq mi)
  - Water: 3.95 km^{2} (1.53 sq mi)

Population (1 January 2026)
  - Total: 806
  - Density: 4.57/km^{2} (11.8/sq mi)

Skujene parish (Latvian: Skujenes pagasts) is an administrative territorial unit in Cēsis Municipality, located in the Vidzeme region of Latvia. Before the administrative reform of 2009, it was part of the former Cēsis District. The parish's administrative center is the village of Skujene.

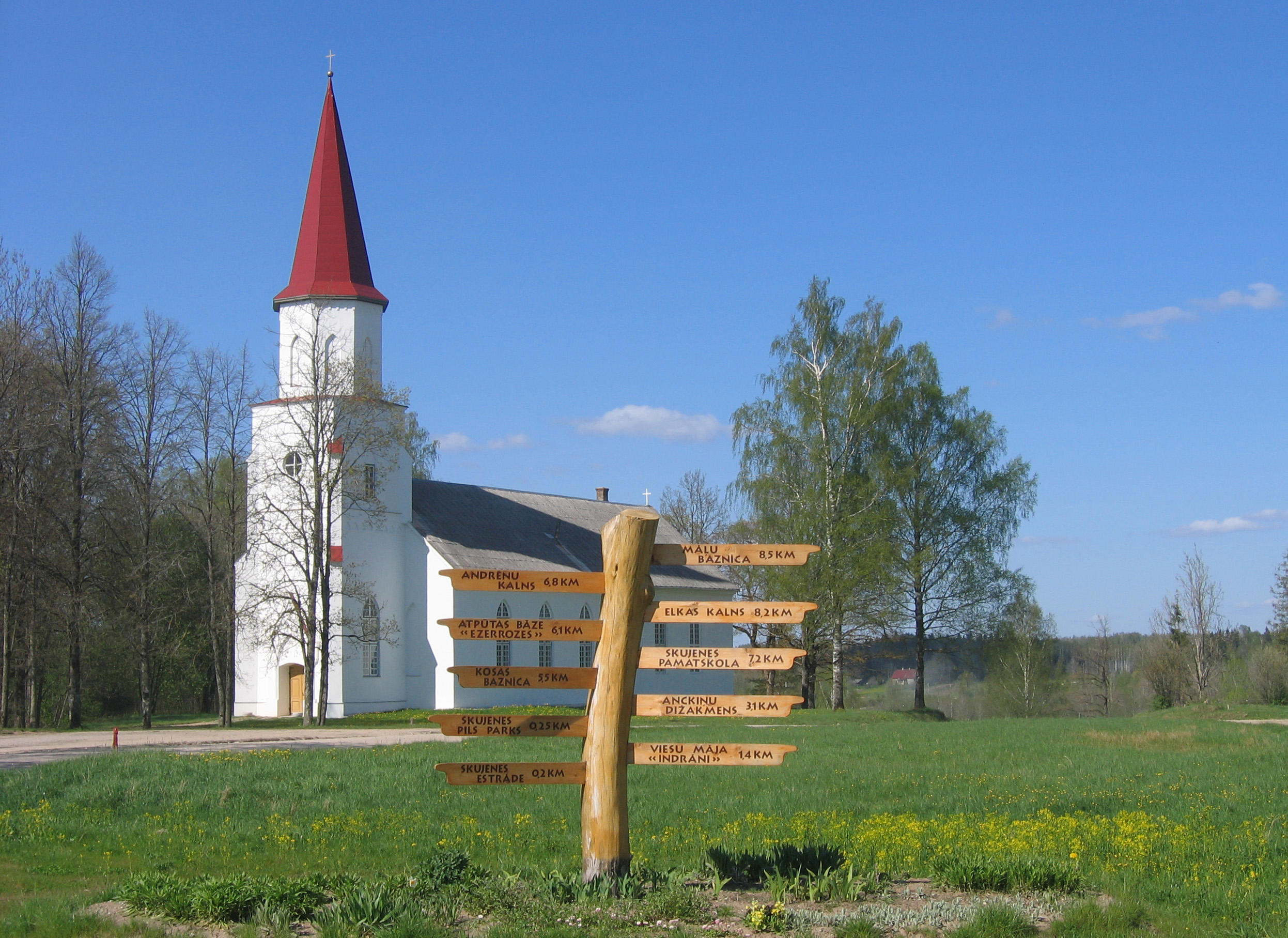
Lutheran church in Skujene village

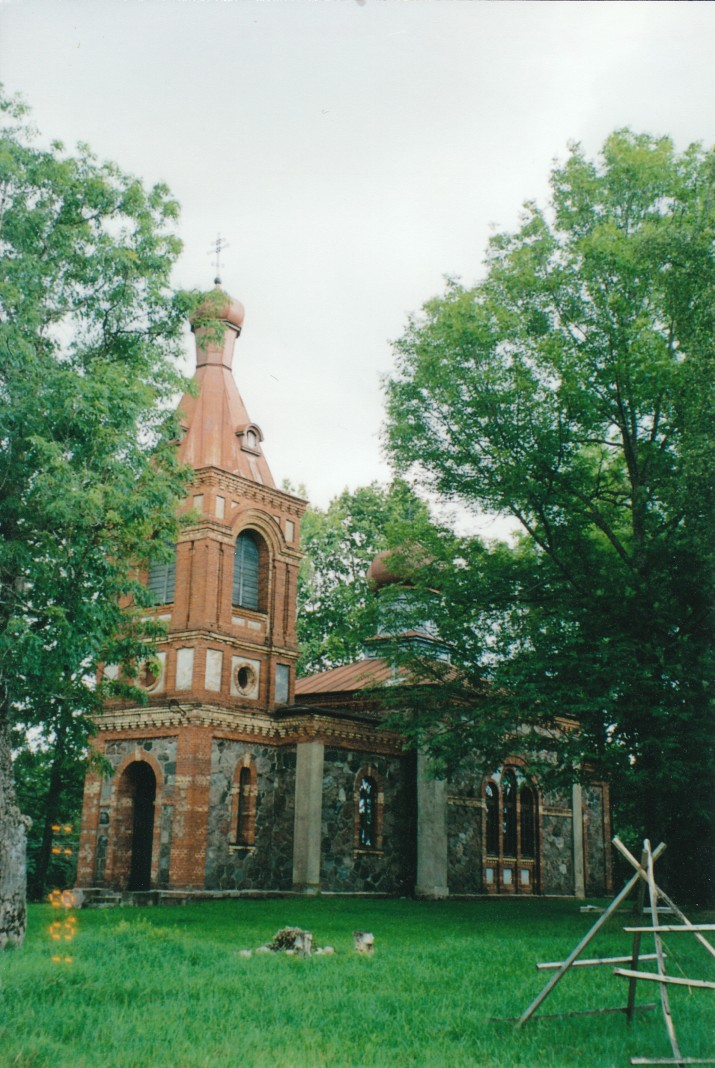
Orthodox church in Kosa village

== Towns, villages and settlements of Skujene Parish ==
- Ģērķēni
- Kosa
- Māļi
- Pērkoņi
- Sērmūkši
- Skujene
- Vecskujene

== See also ==
- Sērmūkši Manor
