= Frederick Henry (Fred) Brigden =

Canadian artist (1871-1956)

F. H. (Fred) Brigden
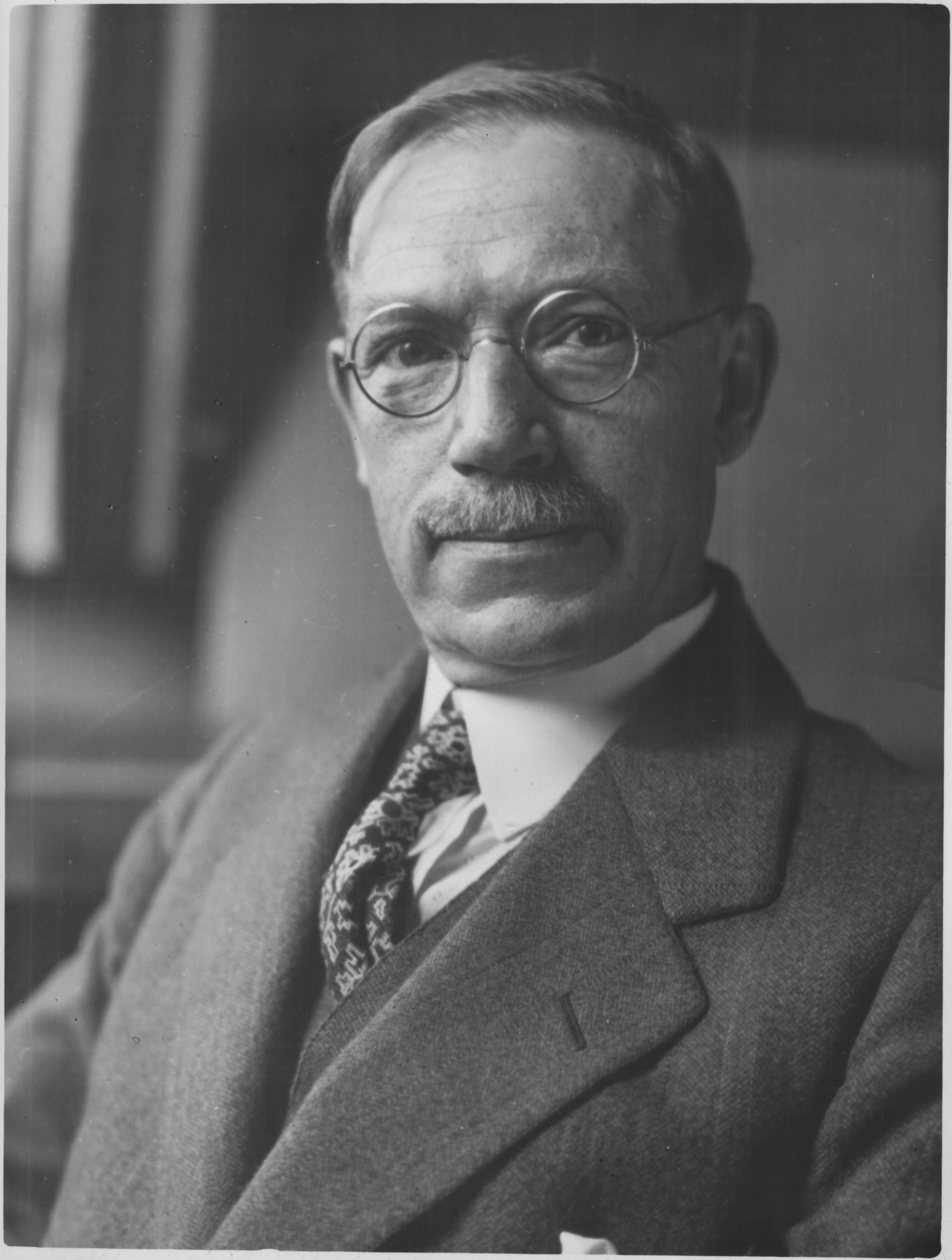
- Born: Frederick Henry Brigden; April 9, 1871; London, England
- Died: 1956 (aged 84–85); Bolton, Ontario
- Known for: Landscape painter, illustrator, commercial engraver

Frederick Henry (Fred) Brigden RCA (April 09, 1871 – 1956), also known as F. H. Brigden, was a landscape painter in oils and watercolour, illustrator, and commercial engraver.

== Career ==
Born in London, England, Brigden came to Canada with his parents in 1872 and with them, settled in Toronto. In 1877, his father Frederick Brigden Senior founded the Toronto Engraving Company with Henry Beale.

In 1898, Fred Brigden became the art director of the Toronto Engraving Company which in 1910 changed its name to Brigdens Limited. In 1914, he opened a branch of Brigden's in Winnipeg and gave employment to such artists as Charles Comfort and many others such as Caven Atkins, Fritz Brandtner, and Nicholas Raphael de Grandmaison.

== Work ==
Since he was talented in art, F. H. Brigden attended the Toronto Art Students' League as a young man, studying with William Cruikshank and George Agnew Reid. He also attended meetings of the Mahlstick Club which included J. E. H. MacDonald among other artists.

Brigden painted in a traditional English watercolour style until about 1906 when he made his first trip to the north country of Canada when his work became brightened and became more decisive. He visited galleries in London, Manchester and Brussels in 1910, and during the summer, Brigden studied with John F. Carlson in Woodstock, New York. In 1912 he visited the Albright Art Gallery, today's Albright-Knox Gallery, in Buffalo, New York, where he saw the Exhibition of Contemporary Scandinavian Art and post-Impressionist and expressionist landscape paintings. It was the same exhibition which J. E. H. MacDonald and Lawren Harris saw and were inspired by in 1913. Bridgen, however, remained more of a traditionalist and retained his long-term interest in the English watercolourists. In 1924 on a business trip to England he examined with interest a portfolio of original watercolours of John Sell Cotman. In 1925, he was one of the founders and the first elected President of the Canadian Society of Painters in Water Colour (CSPWC/SCPA).

Brigden joined the Ontario Society of Artists in 1898 and the Royal Canadian Academy of Arts in 1939 and is represented in the collections of the National Gallery of Canada and the Art Gallery of Ontario. He died on a sketching trip at Bolton, Ontario in 1956.
