= Canadian Society of Graphic Art =

- Successor: Print and Drawing Council of Canada
- Formation: 1904 (as the Graphic Arts Club)
- Dissolved: 1976
- Type: Crafts association
- Legal status: Non-profit organization
- Region served: Canada
- Official language: English, French

The Canadian Society of Graphic Art (CSGA), originally called the Graphic Arts Club, was a non-profit organization of Canadian graphic artists. It was founded in 1904, and formally chartered in 1933. At one time it was one of the larger organizations of Canadian artists.

== History ==
The Society of Graphic Art, or Graphic Arts Club, was organized in 1904 by the members of the Toronto Art Students' League and the Mahlstick Club. Charles William Jefferys was one of the founding members. In 1909 the Canadian National Exhibition granted the Society space at its annual fall fair. The Royal Canadian Academy of Arts supported the Society from 1912. Arthur Lismer published a short essay on the Graphic Arts Club of Toronto and its relationship with the Canadian National Exhibition in The Year Book of Canadian Art 1913. The Graphic Arts Club held its first public exhibition in 1924. This exhibition was held in the Art Gallery of Toronto, where most of the annual shows were held until 1963.

The society published The Canadian Graphic Art Year Book in 1931, with 24 pages and 38 illustrations, in a limited edition of five hundred copies. It was meant to showcase the national scope of Canadian graphics artists and the advances that had been made in the medium. The illustrations included bookplates, book illustrations, drawings and Christmas cards. The Society was formally granted a charter in 1933. At that time it changed its name to the Canadian Society of Graphic Art.

The CSGA was exhibiting serigraphs by the mid-1930s. The CSGA was one of the larger of the Canadian artists' organizations by the late 1930s. The CSGA exhibited at the 1939 New York World's Fair. An exhibition was held in the Art Gallery of Toronto in March–April 1950 for the 50th anniversary of the gallery. All the visual art schools, styles and media were represented. The CSGA was among the eight art societies that contributed to the show. In June–August 1971, the Canadian Society of Graphic Art and the Society of Canadian Painter-Etchers and Engravers held a joint exhibition at the Montreal Museum of Fine Arts. They merged in 1976 to form the Print and Drawing Council of Canada.

== Noted members ==
- Bruno Bobak (1923–2012)
- Victor Child (1897–1960)
- Albert Edward Cloutier (1902–1965)
- Charles Comfort (1900–1994)
- Rody Kenny Courtice (1891–1973)
- Walter R. Duff (1879-1967)
- Michael Forster (1907–2002)
- Simone Hudon-Beaulac (1905–1984)
- Charles William Jefferys (1869–1951)
- André Lapine (1866–1952)
- Ivor Lewis (1882–1958)
- Jo Manning (born 1923)
- Christopher Pratt (born 1935)
- Moe Reinblatt (1917–1979)
- Margaret Shelton (1915–1984)
- Lorne Kidd Smith (1880 – c. 1966)
- Avrom Yanovsky (1911 – 1979)
