= John Wesley Cotton =

Canadian-American artist (1869–1931)

- Born: October 29, 1869; Simcoe County, Ontario
- Died: November 24, 1931 (aged 62); Toronto, Ontario
- Education: Toronto Art Students' League (1886); School of the Art Institute of Chicago; with Eli Marsden Wilson in London (1911-1913)
- Known for: printmaker, watercolorist, and painter
- Spouse: Maude Campbell
- Awards: honorable mention for his exhibition at the Panama–Pacific International Exposition in San Francisco (1915)

John Wesley Cotton (October 29, 1869 – November 24, 1931) was a printmaker and painter in the early years of the 20th century. He was known for his aquatints, etchings, and drypoints, and for introducing the colour aquatint process to Canada.

== Biography ==
Cotton was born in Simcoe County, Ontario, Canada. He was trained as a commercial lithographer and studied at the Toronto Art Students' League from 1891 to 1892, to improve his drawing skills. In 1893 went to Chicago to work for a printing firm. Around 1900, he decided to study at the school of the Art Institute of Chicago but combined his study with work as a lithographer - he worked for Transfer Lithography in Chicago (1902–1904). In 1904, Cotton became a member of the Palette and Chisel Club in Chicago and remained one till 1910.

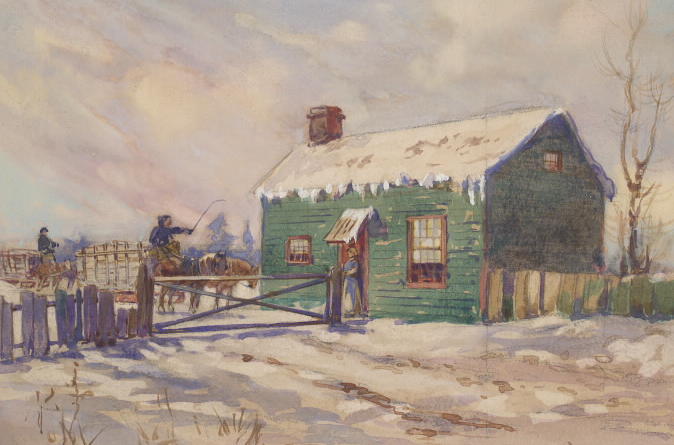
Brockton toll gate

He exhibited his work at the Art Institute of Chicago (1905–1915) and in 1909, maintained a studio in Chicago but returned to Toronto that year and painted historical sites such as Brockton Toll Gate for the John Ross Robertson Historical Collection in the Toronto Public Library

He was in Chicago again in 1910 and perhaps encouraged by Bertha Jaques, he became interested in etching. In 1910 he became a charter member of the Chicago Society of Etchers. He kept his Chicago contacts open when he moved away later, becoming a member of the Chicago Watercolour Club in 1915, for instance.

From 1911 to 1912, he lived in London. He hoped to study with Sir Frank Short at the Royal School of Engraving and Etching (now called the South Kensington School of Art) in London, but the enrollment being full, was advised to study with Eli Marsden Wilson from whom he learned Short's methods. He exhibited his work at the Royal Academy of Art in London (1912), and the Walker Art Gallery in Liverpool (1912). In these years, he also took trips to the English countryside and in Europe and met many artists in their studios. He returned to Toronto from 1912 till 1917 where he played an active role in teaching others etching techniques he had learned in England. A faithful student was Fred S. Haines.

In Toronto, he had his first solo exhibition at the Art Metropole Galleries (1912) and made etchings of local scenic places, such as Winter in High Park, Toronto (1914, Art Gallery of Hamilton) and The Grange, Entrance (1915, Art Gallery of Ontario) (the Grange was the original location of what was then called the Art Museum of Toronto, later the Art Gallery of Ontario). Also in 1915, while a show of his etchings was exhibited at the museum, he demonstrated the process of aquatinting at the institution. From 1914 to 1920 when he resigned, he was a member of the Ontario Society of Artists and showed his work in various shows and at the C.N.E. In 1916, with other former members of the Toronto Art Students' League, he played a leading role in the establishment of the Canadian Society of Painter-Etchers and Engravers.

In World War I, he served with the Allied Expeditionary Force and afterwards made his home in Glendale, California. He was still regarded as Canadian by himself and others. He was included in the Canadian Section of the Fine Arts at the British Empire Exhibition in London in 1924 with an engraving and an aquatint lent by the National Gallery of Canada.

As in Canada, in California Cotton was known for his aquatint prints but added painting in oil to his accomplishments. He travelled widely in the state for inspiration.

Cotton was actively involved in regional art organizations both as an organizer and exhibitor. He helped found the California Water Color Society (today the National Watercolor Society) in 1921 and exhibited his work in its annual exhibitions. The Los Angeles County Museum of Art showed his work in 1923, as did other California associations, clubs and societies.

He was elected president of the Glendale Art Association in 1927. He was also a member of the Society of Canadian Painter-Etchers and Engravers in 1929 and of the Ontario Society of Artists in 1930.

In 1930, Cotton visited France and then travelled to Toronto, Canada where he established a second home and studio. He died suddenly on November 24, 1931.

The Art Gallery of Ontario has photographs of prints made by Cotton possibly in the 1920s. The Smithsonian Libraries also has a file on Cotton.

== Selected public collections ==
- National Gallery of Canada
- Art Gallery of Ontario
- Art Gallery of Hamilton
- Burnaby Art Gallery
- Library and Archives Canada
- Toronto Public Library
- Art Institute of Chicago
- Harwood Museum of Art
- Library of Congress
- Los Angeles County Museum of Art
- Minneapolis Institute of Art
- New York Public Library
- Santa Barbara Historical Museum

== Awards and honours ==
- Exhibited Royal Academy of Art, 1912
- Exhibited Walker Art Gallery, 1912
- DeWolf Prize for etching, Art Institute of Chicago, 1913
- Honorary mention for his exhibition of etchings at the Panama–Pacific International Exposition, 1915
- Gold medal for painting and medal for aquatint, Pacific Southwest Exposition
- First prize for watercolour, Pomona, California, 1927
- First prize, watercolour, Santa Cruz, California, 1928

== Sources ==
- Tovell, Rosemarie L. (1996). A new class of art: The artist's print in Canadian art, 1877-1920. Ottawa: National Gallery of Canada. ISBN 9780888846556.
