= Alfred H. Howard =

British-Canadian artist (1854–1916)

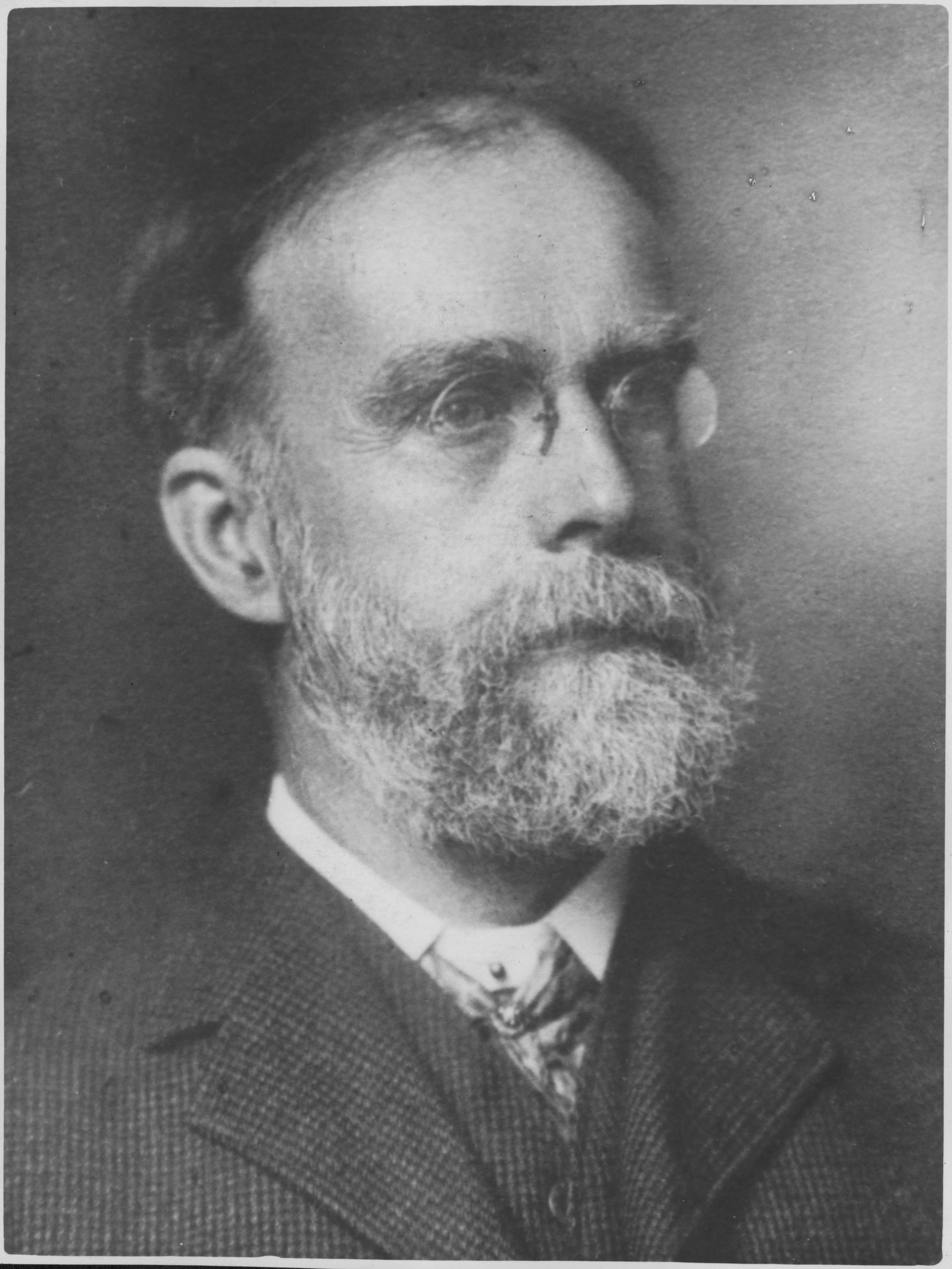
- Born: July 12, 1854; Liverpool, England
- Died: February 17, 1916 (aged 61); Toronto, Ontario
- Known for: graphic artist, calligrapher, decorative designer
- Spouse: Isabella Harriet Eunice Cannell (m. 1876)

Alfred Harold Howard RCA who signed his work as A. H. Howard (1854–1916) was a British-born artist who lived in Toronto, Ontario. He was an illustrator, graphic artist, calligrapher, and decorative designer.

== Career ==
Howard was born in Liverpool, England on 12 July 1854. There, he apprenticed as a lithographer with the firm, Maclure, MacDonald and MacGregor, where he was taught the South Kensington Ideal, which preferred the use of flat colours over light and shading. He married Isabella Harriet Eunice Cannell July 17, 1876, and together they emigrated to Canada and founded a graphic design firm in Toronto. Howard established himself in the graphic arts community and eventually produced bookplate designs for the Toronto Public Library's first librarian, James Bain, and for the National Gallery of Canada.

Howard also taught at the Ontario School of Art from 1880 to 1882. In 1881, he was awarded the Marquis of Lorne's Medal for Design. Two years later, in 1883, he became a member of the prestigious Royal Canadian Academy of Arts. He was also a member of the Toronto Art Students' League, the Ontario Society of Artists (OSA), and the Arts and Letters Club of Toronto. In 1907, Howard was selected to represent the OSA on the Toronto Guild of Civic Art committee during the selection of art purchases.

Howard died in Toronto on February 17, 1916.
