= Wesley Stambaugh =

Canadian politician

John Wesley Stambaugh (July 1, 1887 – March 20, 1970) was a farmer and Canadian Senator.

Born in Melvin, Michigan United States, Wesley was appointed to the Senate of Canada on the advice of Prime Minister Louis St-Laurent on September 7, 1949, he served in the senate until June 8, 1965.

Wesley served as president of the Alberta Liberal Party from 1949 to 1956.
