= Bruce, Alberta =

Bruce
- Hamlet
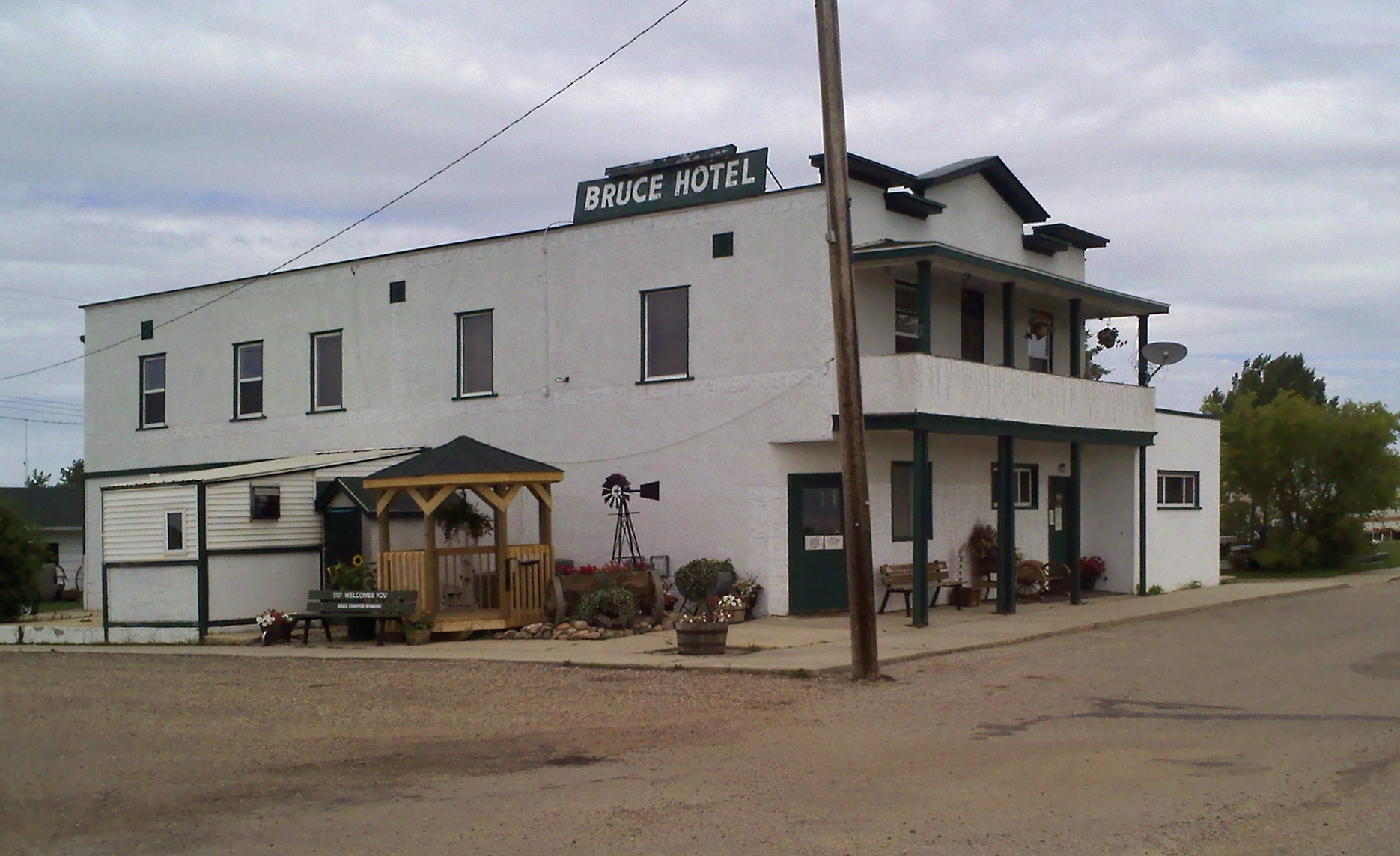
- Bruce Hotel and Restaurant

- Location of Bruce in Alberta
- Coordinates: 53°10′24″N 112°2′20″W
- Country: Canada
- Province: Alberta
- Census division: No. 10
- Municipal district: Beaver County

Government
  - Type: Unincorporated
  - Governing body: Beaver County Council

Area (2021)
  - Land: 0.86 km^{2} (0.33 sq mi)
- Elevation: 680 m (2,230 ft)

Population (2021)
  - Total: 65
  - Density: 75.7/km^{2} (196/sq mi)
- Time zone: UTC−06:00 (Alberta Time)
- Postal Code: T0B 0R0

Bruce is a hamlet in Alberta, Canada within Beaver County. It is located along Highway 14 between Viking and Ryley, approximately 115 kilometres (71 mi) east of Edmonton, and has an elevation of 680 meters (2,230 ft). The hamlet is located in Census Division No. 10 and in the federal riding of Vegreville-Wainwright.

== Toponymy ==
Bruce derives its name from Alexander Bruce Smith, manager of the Grand Trunk Pacific Telegraph Company in 1909.

== Economy and services ==
=== Freight ===
The Canadian National Railway provides freight services connected to Bruce as of 2026.

=== Amenities ===
As of 2026, Bruce Hotel, first established in 1910, operates as a steakhouse, serving as a tourist attraction. Bruce Community Hall hosts periodic events and also contains a satellite location of the Holden Municipal Library.

=== Events ===
The Bruce Stampede, Canada's oldest one-day rodeo, is hosted annually in the hamlet.

== History ==
=== Founding: 1905-1914 ===
Between 1905 and 1909, Bruce was known as Hurry, and was served by a post office with the same name. The Grand Trunk Pacific Railway established a stop in the area in 1909, which was named Bruce in honour of Grand Trunk Pacific employee Alexander Bruce Smith. The post office subsequently changed names to Bruce as well. Two years later, the townsite saw the opening of the Bruce Hotel.

Two schools were established in the settlement in the 1910s: the West Bruce School and the East Bruce School. In 1914, the first annual Bruce Stampede was hosted in the townsite.

=== Development: 1915-1945 ===
Bruce Community Hall was built by the end of the 1920s. Missionaries of the Lutheran Church–Missouri Synod began giving sermons in Bruce in 1921. They operated out of the homes of practitioners until 1934, when a permanent place of worship, the Immanuel Lutheran Church, was built.

On New Year's Day, 1928, nearly 8,000 homes in Edmonton were left without heating after a break occurred in a natural gas line maintained by Northwestern Utilities (NU). Several residents also suffered carbon monoxide poisoning. When questioned by city officials about NU's delay in addressing the break, Christopher J. Yorath blamed the lack of a permanent telephone service in Bruce. At the time, Bruce's telephone service did not operate on weekends, meaning NU employees based there could not be contacted to act.

==== Second World War ====
Bruce local Gerald Emes enlisted for Canada during the Second World War and attained the rank of pilot officer in the Royal Air Force. In April 1943, after a 25-mile fight with six Focke-Wulf 190s, Emes was shot down into the English Channel, where he deployed a rubber dinghy and drifted for eight days. Surviving on malted milk tablets, he eventually drifted close enough to the English coast to be rescued.

Another Bruce local, Ira Haight, participated in D-Day and the Battle of Normandy. Haight had joined the army at the age of 19 because he found it difficult to find a job. On October 8, 2015, delegates of the government of France presented 92-year-old Haight with the Legion d'Honneur, the highest French order of merit, at the Alberta Legislature.

=== Post-war era: 1946-1969 ===
In September 1949, Bruce resident and president of the Alberta Liberal Party, John Wesley Stambaugh, was appointed to the Senate of Canada by Louis St. Laurent.

In 1957, the West Bruce School shut down. The Holden chapter of the Royal Canadian Legion purchased the building and moved it to Holden to serve as a clubhouse.

=== Hamlet: 1979-present ===
Bruce was declared a hamlet in August 1979.

In 2013, the Bruce Stampede celebrated 100 years of operations.

== Demographics ==
Population history of Bruce
Year	Pop.	±%
1941	168	—
1951	157	−6.5%
1956	159	+1.3%
1961	171	+7.5%
1966	147	−14.0%
1971	110	−25.2%
1976	93	−15.5%
1981	88	−5.4%
1986	93	+5.7%
1991	61	−34.4%
2011	60	−1.6%
2016	50	−16.7%
2016R	60	+20.0%
2021	65	+8.3%
Source: Statistics Canada

In the 2021 Census of Population conducted by Statistics Canada, Bruce had a population of 65 living in 40 of its 53 total private dwellings, a change of 8.3% from its 2016 population of 60. With a land area of 0.86 km^{2} (0.33 sq mi), it had a population density of 75.6/km^{2} (195.8/sq mi) in 2021.

As a designated place in the 2016 Census of Population conducted by Statistics Canada, Bruce had a population of 50 living in 31 of its 51 total private dwellings, a change of −16.7% from its 2011 population of 60. With a land area of 0.86 km^{2} (0.33 sq mi), it had a population density of 58.1/km^{2} (150.6/sq mi) in 2016.

As of 2026, Beaver County reports that Bruce has a population of "approximately 70" people.

=== Religion ===
Immanuel Lutheran Church remains operational in Bruce as of 2026.

== Notable people ==
- Margaret Shelton (1915–1984), Canadian print maker
- John Wesley Stambaugh (1887–1970), senator

== See also ==
- List of communities in Alberta
- List of hamlets in Alberta
