= John David Kelly (artist) =

Canadian artist (1862–1958)

- Born: 15 October 1862; Gore's Landing, Ontario
- Died: 27 December 1958 (aged 96); Toronto
- Education: Ontario School of Art, later known as OCAD, Toronto
- Known for: painting, printmaking, artist-illustrator
- Spouse: Alice Bigelow (m. 1886)

John David Kelly (October 15, 1862 – December 27, 1958) who signed his work J. D. Kelly was an "enormously popular" painter, printmaker and artist-illustrator known for the series of calendar illustrations he did for the Confederation Life Association, depicting great moments in Canadian history. He researched his historical paintings with such accuracy that he has been described by the Toronto Globe & Mail as a reconstructor rather than a painter of historical scenes. His work "made history more real to hundreds and thousands of Canadians".

== Biography ==
Kelly was born at Gore's Landing, Ontario on the south shore of Rice Lake, near Peterborough. In 1878, he enrolled at the Ontario School of Art, later known as OCAD, studying with Marmaduke Matthews, John Arthur Fraser and Henri Perré, becoming a gold medalist in 1881 and graduating in 1882.

From 1882 to 1885, he worked for the Grip Lithographing firm, then joined the Toronto Lithographing Company, the largest and most advanced lithography firm in the city (it became Rolph-Clark-Stone Ltd), and spent 70 years with the company as its premier calendar artist, retiring in 1955.

He was one of the founders of the Toronto Art Students' League and contributed to its calendars. He was commissioned by the C.P.R to make illustrated maps and in 1911 and 1929, the C.P.R. commissioned him to travel across Canada o to record images of the country.

He exhibited his paintings at the Ontario Society of Artists exhibitions, where he was elected a member (1895–1912), in the Royal Canadian Academy of Arts, the Art Association of Montreal, Montreal Art Club and the Pan-American Exposition in Buffalo (1901).

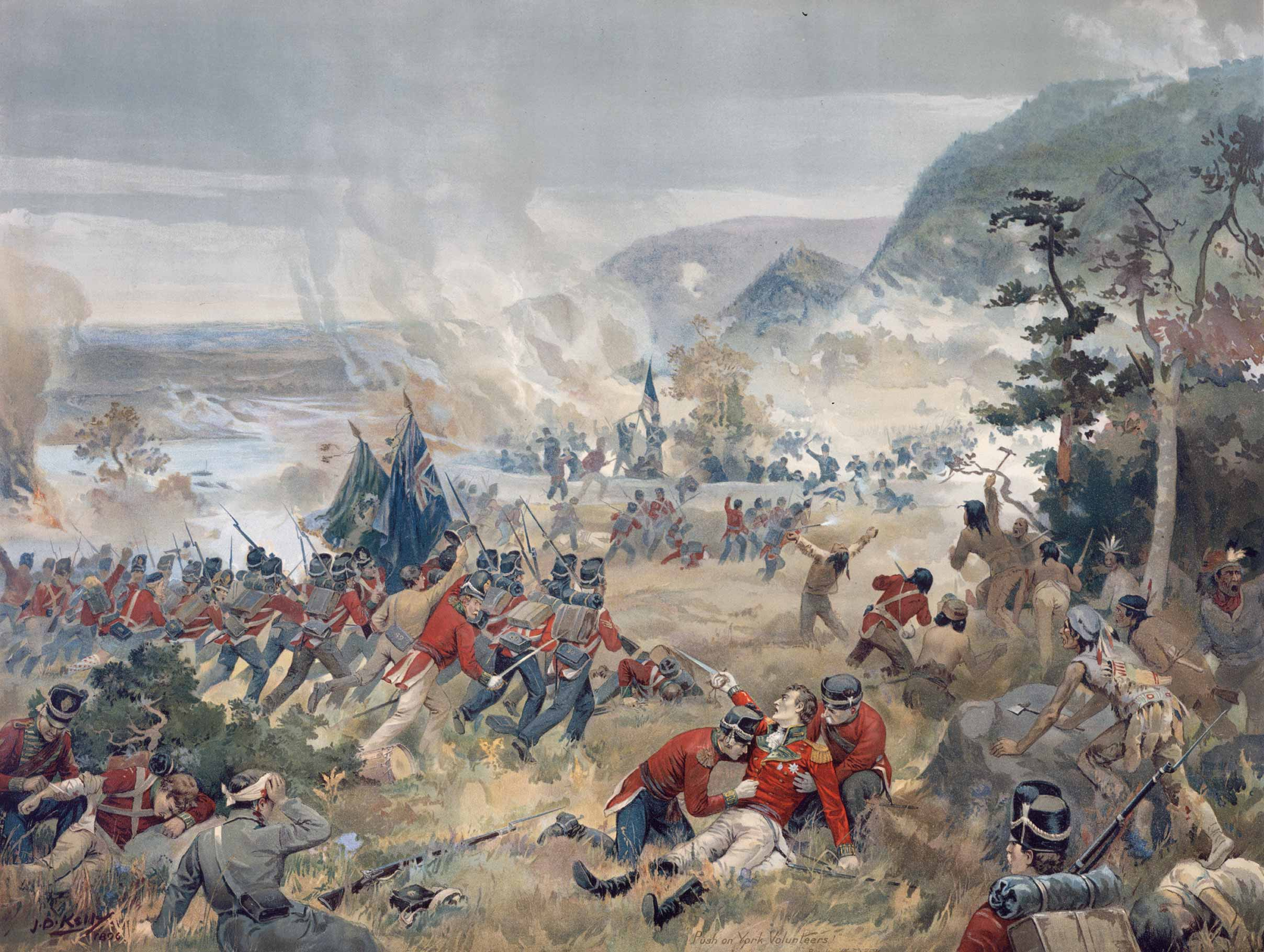
Push on, brave York volunteers(large)

His series of historical paintings are in the collection of Confederation Life (28 works), (Note: It is called the "Gallery of Canadian History" and was shown throughout Canada, the United States, and in London, England; appeared on Confederation's annual calendars, and in booklets for many different groups, art classes, and historical societies.) the Art Gallery of Ontario, the McCord Stewart Museum in Montreal, the Toronto Public Library and Library and Archives Canada which has Push On, brave York volunteers (1896) and also has his fonds. 13 of the prints of the paintings owned by Confederation Life are owned by the Cobourg Museum Foundation. Lithographs are also in the collection of Bridgeman Images. Two murals by Kelly are owned by the Royal York Hotel. There is a heritage plaque in Warkworth that recognizes his life and work as a historical artist.

== Personal life ==
One of Kelly's feet was crushed in a logging accident as a young man.
