= Edmund Wyly Grier =

Sir Edmund Wyly Grier RCA
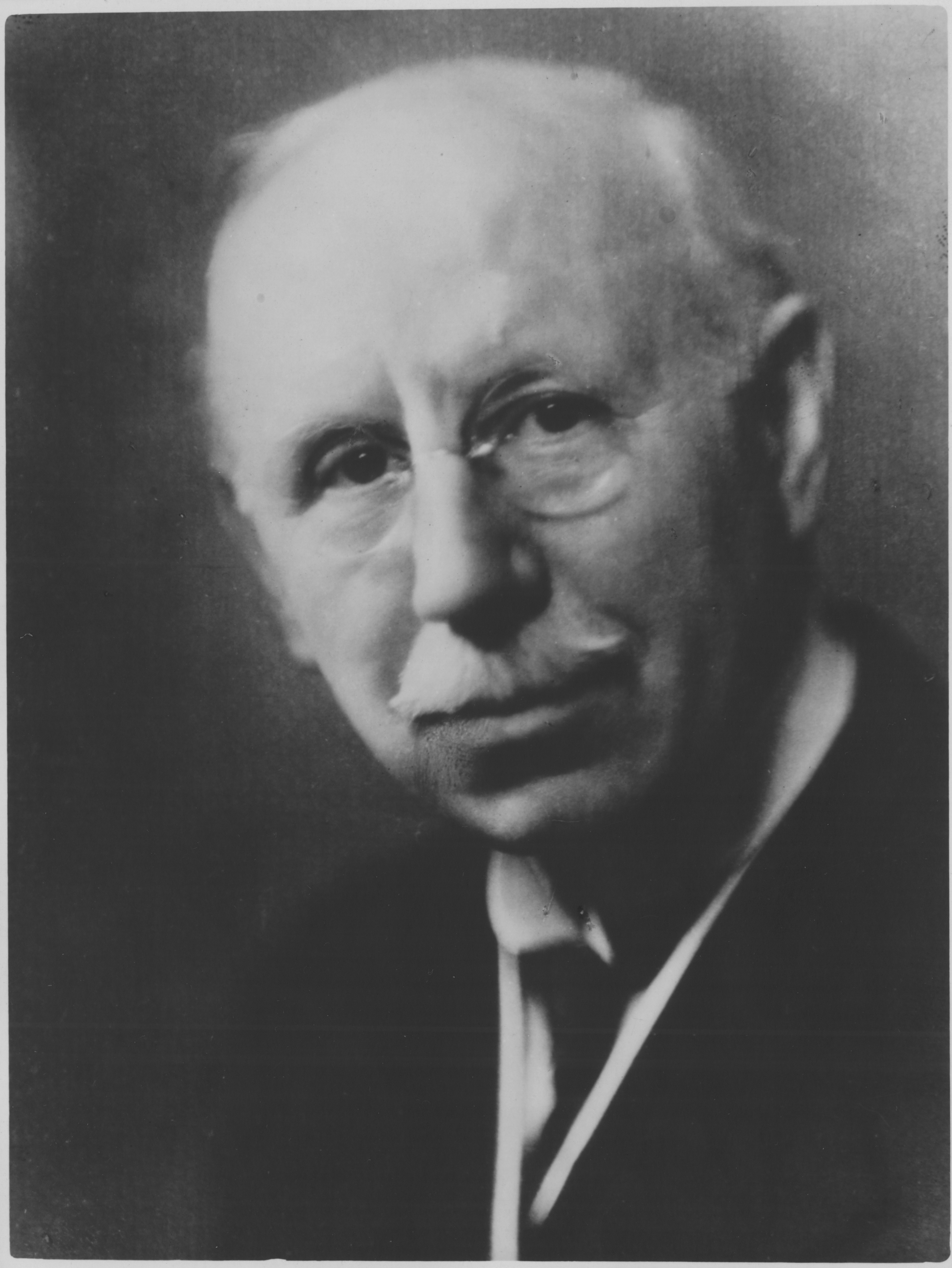
- 1931 portrait
- Born: November 26, 1862; Melbourne, Colony of Victoria
- Died: December 7, 1957 (aged 95); Toronto, Ontario, Canada
- Education: Slade School of Art, Académie Julian
- Known for: Painter
- Spouse: Miss Dickson

Sir Edmund Wyly Grier RCA (November 26, 1862 – December 7, 1957), also known as E. Wyly Grier, was an Australian-born Canadian portrait painter.

== Career ==
Grier first came to Canada with his parents in 1876 and attended Upper Canada College but when he graduated, he and his parents went back to England so that he could study at the Slade School of Art in London. He studied at the Slade with Alphonse Legros, in Rome at the Scuola Libera del Nudo, and in Paris at the Académie Julian with Adolphe Bouguereau and Tony Robert-Fleury. He exhibited from 1886 to 1895 at the Royal Society of British Artists and at the Royal Academy. In 1890, he won a gold medal at the Paris Salon. In 1891, he returned to Canada to stay, opening a portrait studio in Toronto.

He painted numerous portraits of politicians, corporate leaders and other notable contemporaries, his first commissioned portrait being in 1888 and his last in 1947. Through his portraits, Grier won recognition and admission to the Royal Canadian Academy of Arts in 1894, becoming its president in 1929–1939. In 1901, he won a silver medal at the Pan-American Exhibition at Buffalo. He was active in several arts organizations, including the Ontario Society of Artists (c. 1896) (President, 1908–1913), and was a founding member and second president of the Arts and Letters Club of Toronto.

Grier received an honorary Doctor of Civil Law from the University of Bishop’s College in 1934. In 1935, he was made a Knight Bachelor by the government of Richard Bedford Bennett, the first Canadian to receive a knighthood in recognition of his work as an artist. In 1937, he was elected into the National Academy of Design as an Honorary Corresponding Academician.

His work is in many public institutions including the National Gallery of Canada, the Art Gallery of Ontario and the Robert McLaughlin Gallery.

== Personal life ==
From 1897 to 1903, he served with the Royal Canadian Artillery, rising to the rank of major in command of the 9th Field Battery. In 1903, he served as vice-president of the Royal Military Institute.

== Gallery ==
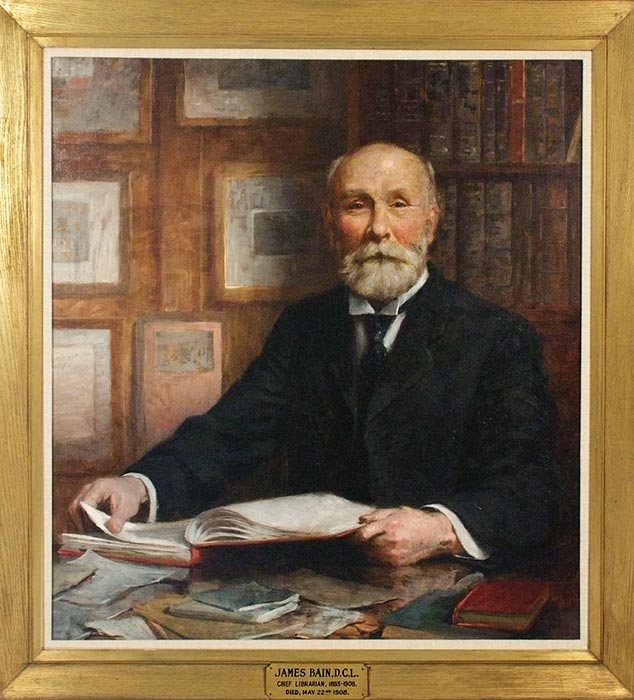
Toronto city librarian James Bain, 1909

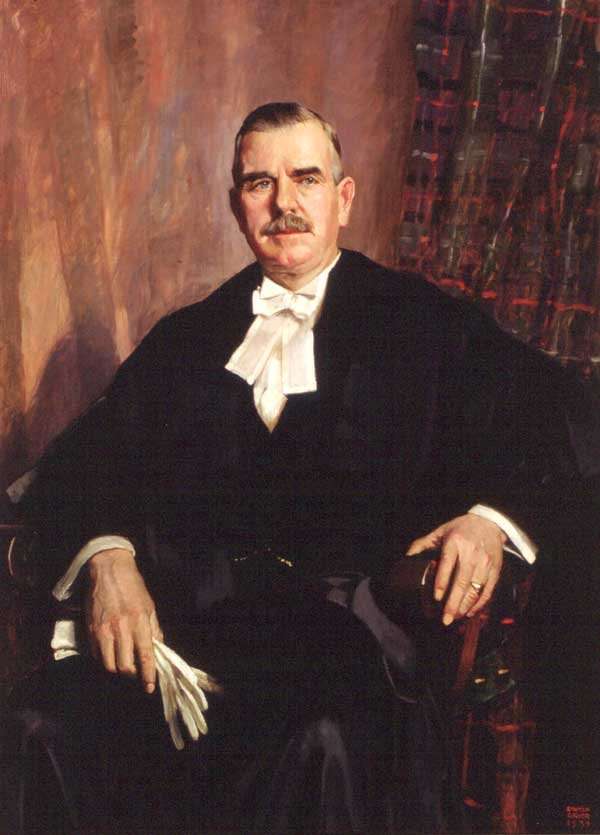
Speaker William David Black, 1930

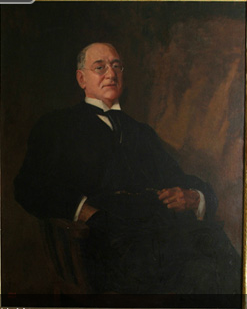
George Henry Murray, Province House (Nova Scotia)

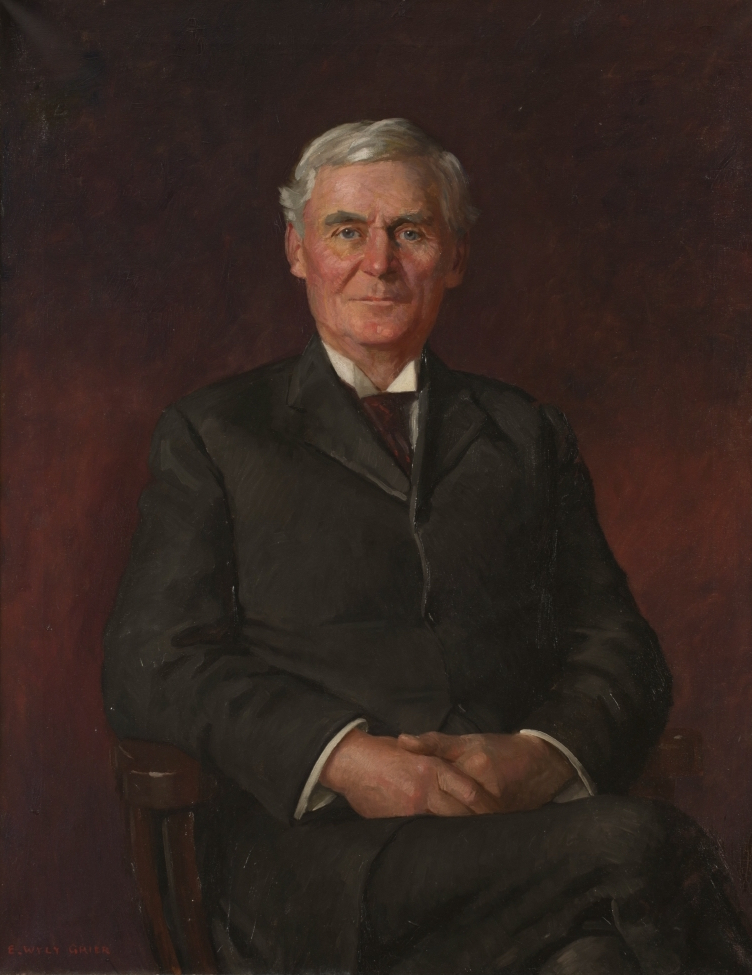
Richard Chapman Weldon

Cultural offices
Preceded by Henry Sproatt	President of the Royal Canadian Academy of Arts; 1929-1939	Succeeded by Frederick Stanely Haines
