= Charles William Jefferys =

English-born Canadian artist, author and teacher

Charles William Jefferys RCA
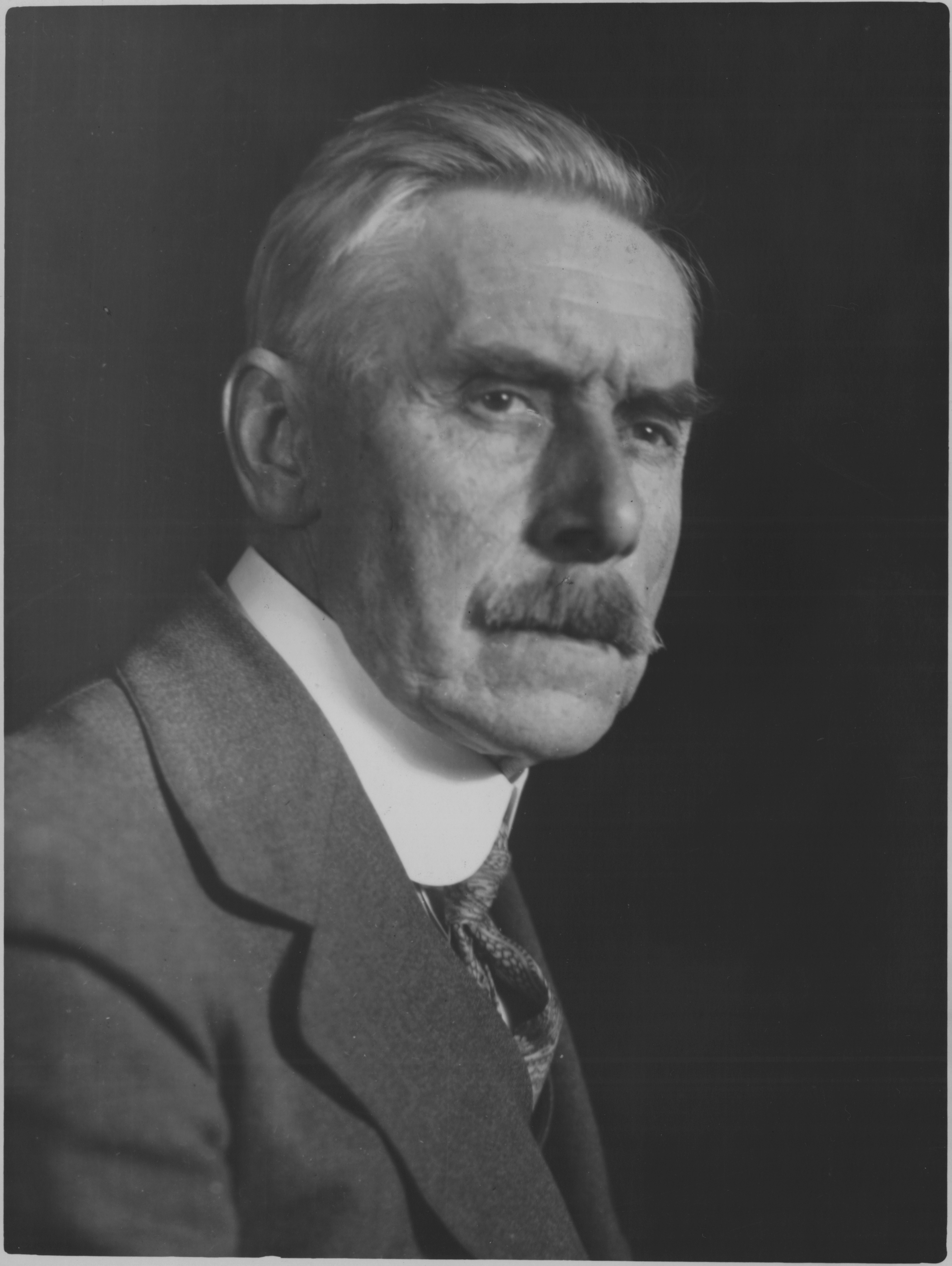
- Born: August 25, 1869; Rochester, Kent
- Died: October 8, 1951 (aged 82); Toronto, Ontario
- Relatives: Harold Gordon Stacey (son-in-law)

Charles William Jefferys RCA who signed his name C. W. Jefferys (August 25, 1869 – October 8, 1951) was an English-born Canadian artist, author and teacher best known for his historical illustrations.

== Early life ==
Jefferys was born in Rochester, Kent, to Charles Thomas Jefferys and Ellen Kennard. He moved with his family first to Philadelphia in 1875, then to Hamilton, Ontario, in 1878, and finally to Toronto around 1880. There, he attended school and was apprenticed with the York Lithography Company from 1885 to 1890.

== Career ==
From 1889 to 1892, Jefferys worked for the Toronto Globe as an illustrator and artist. He produced artwork for several printing companies. From 1893 to 1901, he worked for the New York Herald. Returning to Toronto, he became a newspaper, magazine and book illustrator, appearing in numerous publications, including Hardware Merchandising.

Jefferys created a series of illustrations and essays for the Toronto Star Weekly, which in 1920 were published as Dramatic Episodes in Canada's Story. The following year, he was chosen by the Ontario government to illustrate a textbook, Ontario Public School History of Canada, written by George Wrong.

Along with Ivor Lewis and other artists, Jefferys co-founded the Graphic Arts Club (later named the Canadian Society of Graphic Art), which by the 1940s became one of the primary artists' groups in Canada. As well, from 1912 to 1939, he taught painting and drawing in the Department of Architecture at the University of Toronto.

During World War I, he was commissioned by the Canadian War Records department to paint soldiers training at Camp Petawawa and Niagara. Jefferys had an interest in history, and he produced accurate and meticulous portrayals of early Canadian life. The best known collection of his historical sketches is the three volume The Picture Gallery of Canadian History (c. 1942–1960).

In 1926, he was made a member of the Royal Canadian Academy of Arts. He also was a member of the Ontario Society of Artists and the Canadian Society of Painters in Water Colour. Jefferys was a founding member of the Arts and Letters Club of Toronto and was its president from 1923 to 1924.

== Death and legacy ==
Soon after Jefferys's death in 1952, more than 1,000 of his drawings were sold to the Imperial Oil Company, which in 1972 donated the collection to Library and Archives Canada. A plaque at 4111 Yonge Street, where he died, quotes him as saying,

"If my work has stirred any interest in our country and its past, I am more than paid".

Jefferys received numerous awards, including an honorary Doctor of Laws degree from Queen’s University in 1934. C. W. Jefferys Collegiate Institute, a public high school in Toronto, is named for him. There are works by him in the art collection of the Royal Military College of Canada the National Gallery of Canada, and the Art Gallery of Ontario. A statue of Jefferys, created by Adrienne Alison, has been installed in York Mills Valley Park. Jeffreys has been designated as an Historic Person in the Directory of Federal Heritage Designations.

== Gallery ==
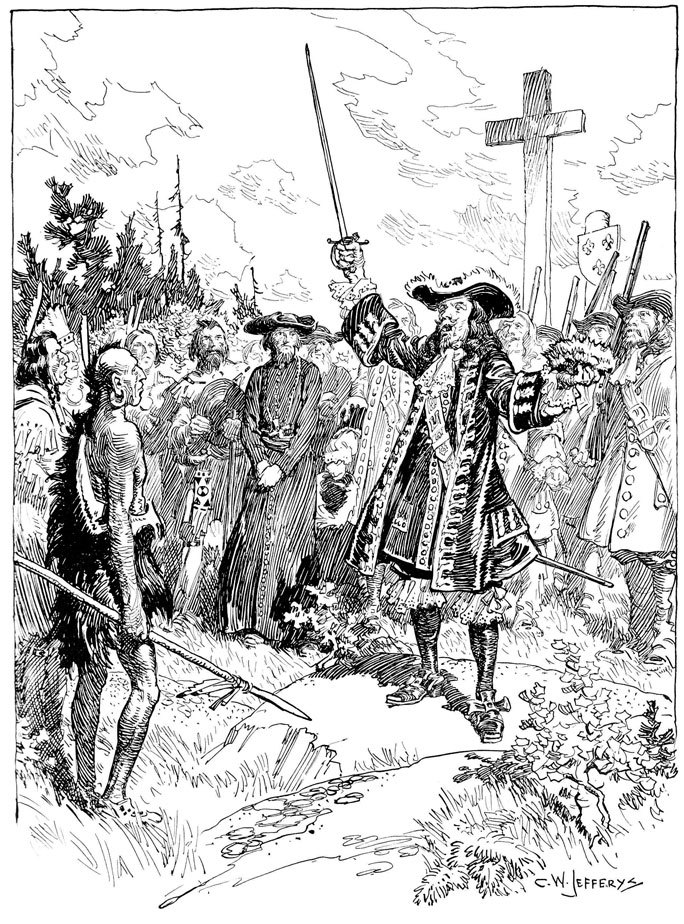
Simon-François Daumont de Saint-Lusson

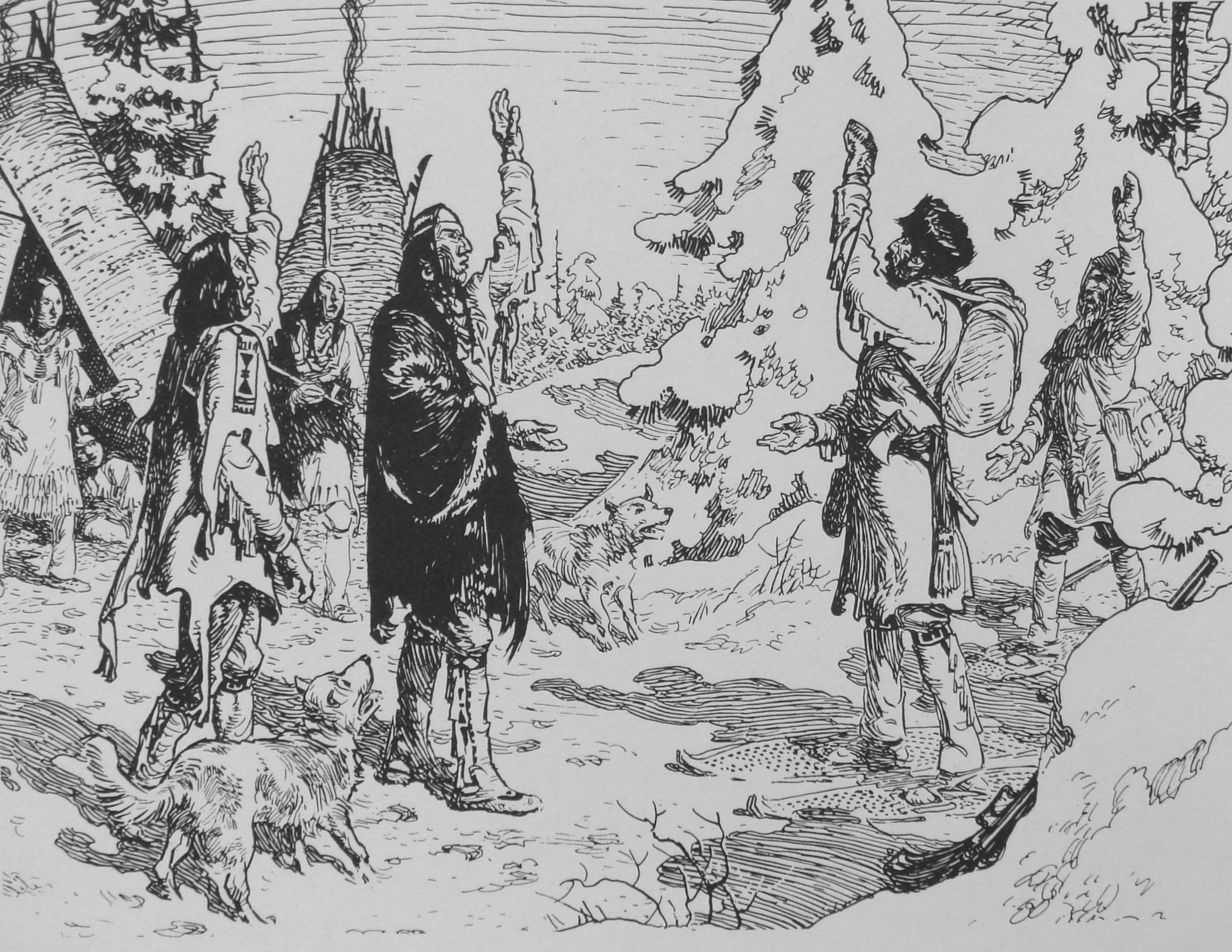
Arrival of Pierre-Esprit Radisson in an American Indian camp in 1660.
Dessin par Charles William Jefferys.

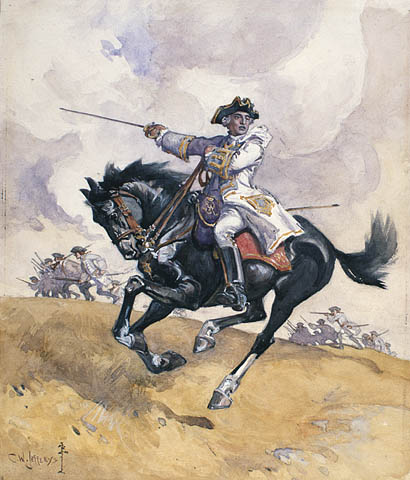
Montcalm at the head of their troops on the Plains of Abraham. Watercolour by Charles William Jefferys.

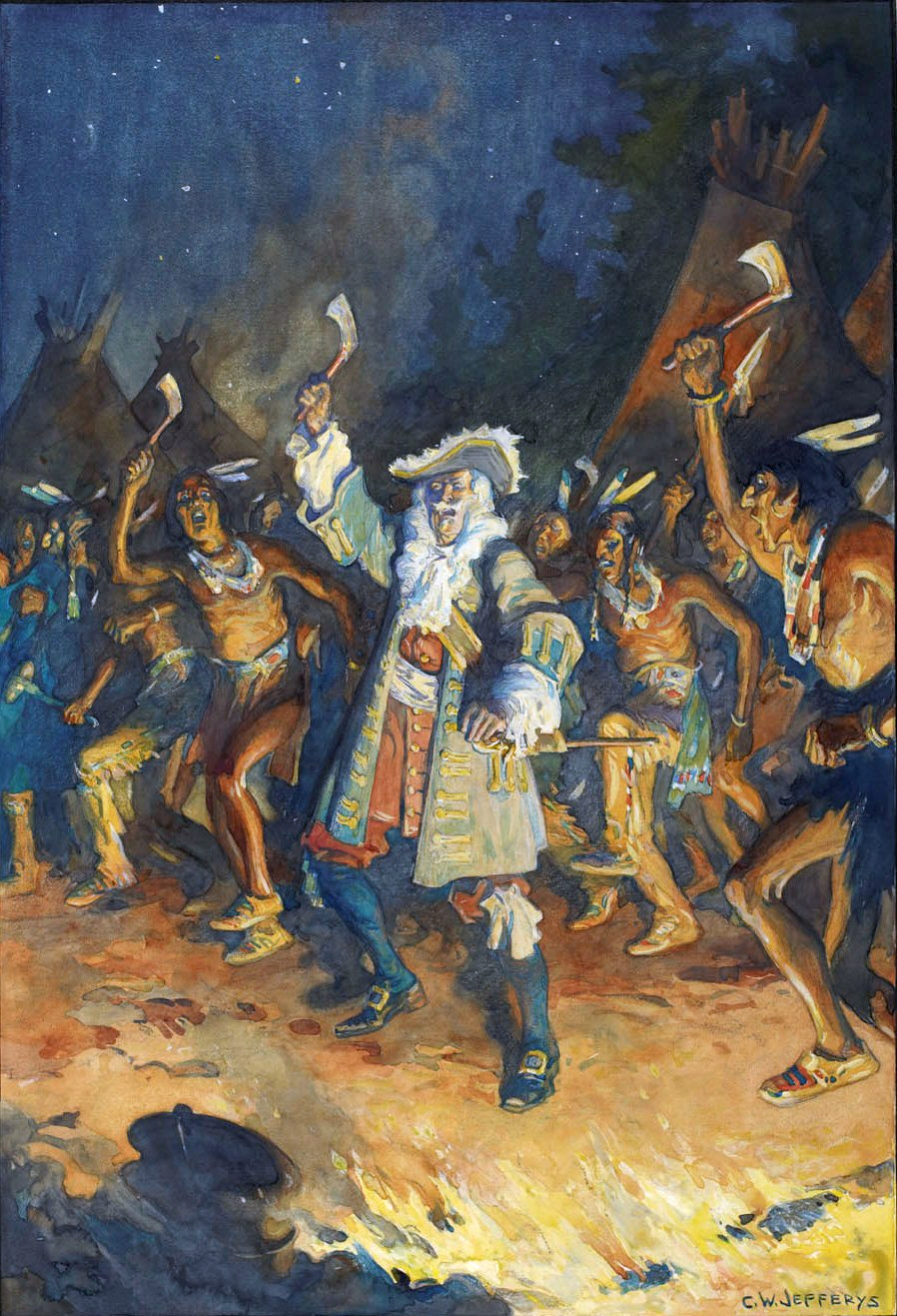
Frontenac with the Indians (1914)

Kelsey Sees the Buffalo, 1691 (c. 1927)

Founding of Halifax, 1749 (1930)

== See also ==
- Canadian official war artists
- War artist
- War art
