= Society of Canadian Painter-Etchers and Engravers =

- Formation: 1916
- Dissolved: 1976
- Type: Crafts association
- Legal status: Non-profit organization
- Region served: Canada
- Official language: English, French

The Society of Canadian Painter-Etchers and Engravers (CPE) was a non-profit organization of Canadian etchers and engravers.

== History ==
The Society of Canadian Painter-Etchers and Engravers (CPE) was founded in 1916 as a successor to the short-lived Association of Canadian Etchers, founded in 1885. William W. Alexander was a founding member along with other former members of the Toronto Art Students' League such as W.J. Thomson, John Wesley Cotton, T.G. Greene, and Charles Macdonald Manly. Alexander participated in the Society's exhibitions with bookplates based on his sketches and watercolors from northern canoe trips. The CPE was relatively conservative. It favored intaglio and insisted that the artist should be involved in each stage of production including drawing, engraving or etching, and printing the block or plate.

The Society began holding annual exhibitions in 1919 at the Art Gallery of Toronto. Usually these were part of larger exhibitions. The Society held exhibitions in other locations in Toronto from 1933 to 1959. The Society was formally incorporated on 1935. From 1943 to 1959 it exhibited at the Royal Ontario Museum. The Canadian Society of Graphic Art (CSGA) was exhibiting serigraphs by the mid-1930. However, the CPE would not accept silkscreen prints until 1946. Even then, it was careful to exclude commercial methods of silkscreen printing. Between 1960 and 1974 the Society's annual exhibitions were each held in a different city in Ontario.

Jo Manning, who made prints between 1960 and 1980, was an executive member of the Canadian Society of Graphic Art and a member of the Canadian Society of Painter-etchers and Engravers. In June–August 1971 the Society held a joint exhibition at the Montreal Museum of Fine Arts with the Canadian Society of Graphic Art. The Society merged with the Canadian Society of Graphic Art in 1976 to form the Print and Drawing Council of Canada. Jo Manning was a founding member of the new Council.
