= Richard-Max Tremblay =

Canadian artist and photographer

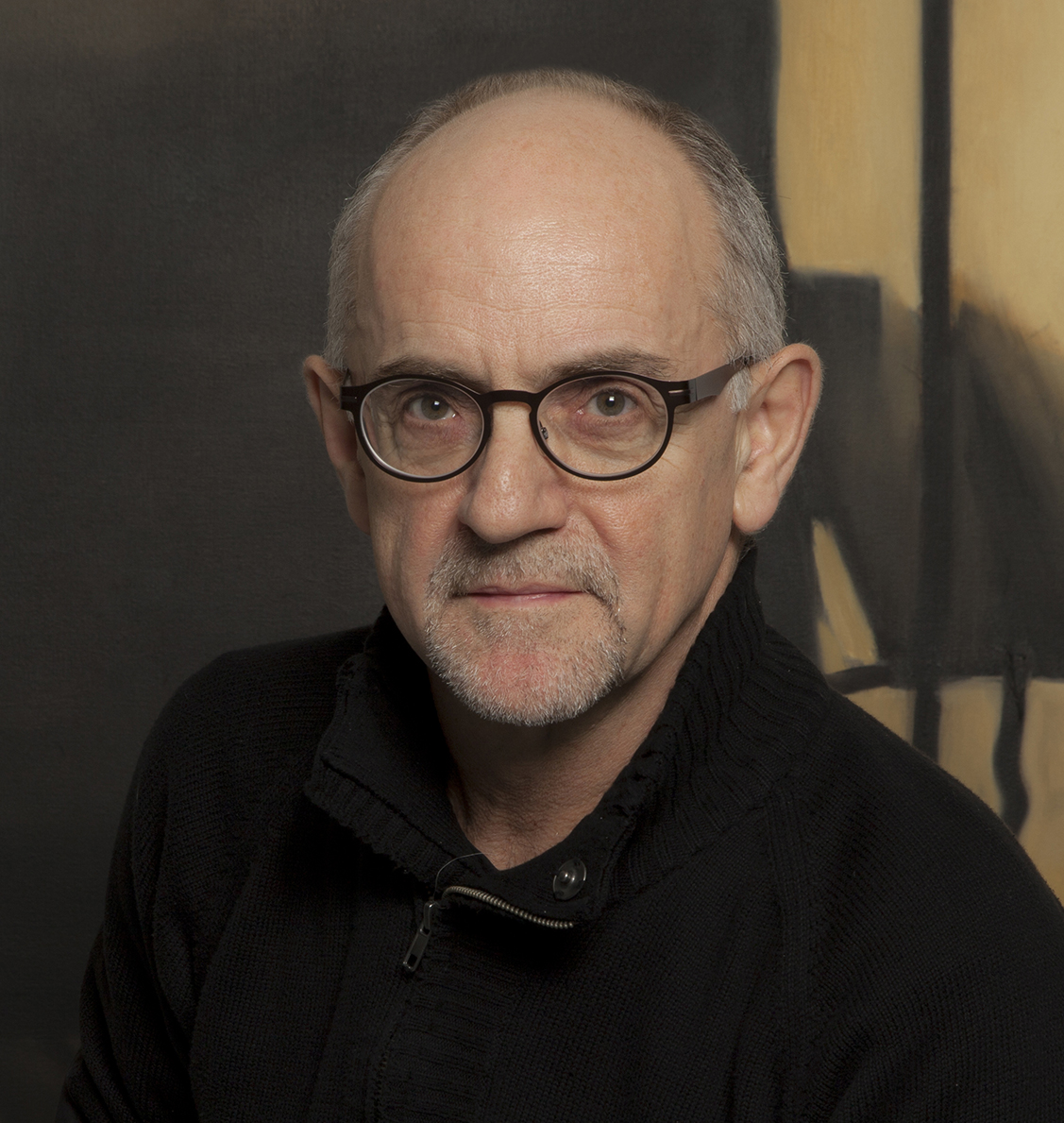
- Tremblay in 2012
- Born: 1952 (age 73–74); Bromptonville (Sherbrooke), Quebec
- Known for: Painter, Photographer
- Awards: 2015 RCA Trust Award, 2003 Prix Louis-Comtois
- Elected: Royal Canadian Academy of Arts (RCA)
- Website: richardmaxtremblay.com

Richard-Max Tremblay RCA (born 1952) is a Canadian artist and photographer. Known for painting and photographic portraits, Tremblay's artistic approach is described as "a dialogue between two media, photography and painting". He is the recipient of the Royal Canadian Academy of Arts' 2015 RCA Trust Award, the 2003 Prix Louis-Comtois, and, as cinematographer of Gugging, the 1996 Special Jury Prize, International Festival of Films on Art and Pedagogy (UNESCO Paris). Tremblay's work is found in the collections of the Montreal Museum of Fine Arts, Musée national des beaux-arts du Québec, Musée d'art contemporain de Montréal, Musée d’art de Joliette, the City of Montreal and the Canada Council for the Arts' Art Bank.

== Career ==
Richard-Max Tremblay was born in the Eastern-Township community of Bromptonville, Quebec. As a young art student a viewing of a painting by Pierre Soulages at the Montreal Museum of Contemporary Art made a lasting impression. He moved to Montreal to study art in 1972 and graduated with a Bachelor of Fine Arts degree from the Université du Québec à Montréal in 1975. He continued art studies in London in 1979-80 and received a post-graduate Diploma in Fine Arts from Goldsmiths College of Art and Design (now Goldsmiths, University of London). On his return to Montreal, Tremblay continued to paint and exhibited a series on London-deckchairs Les chaises in 1984 and portraits Têtes in 1985 at Galerie 13. At this time Tremblay began to explore photography and his images of artists Guido Molinari, Yves Gaucher, and Betty Goodwin were exhibited as Portraits 1983-1987 at John A. Schweitzer Gallery. In 1987 he was commissioned by the Musée national des beaux-arts du Québec to photograph recipients of the Prix Paul-Émile Borduas for the 1988 exhibition L'art au Québec depuis Pellan: une histoire des prix Borduas. Solo exhibitions of his work were held in 1994 at the Musée d’art de Joliette and Saidye Bronfman Centre for the Arts (Montreal). From 1993-9 he was cinematographer, editor, and co-writer of the video Gugging (1996), on artists at the Gugging psychiatric residence near Vienna, Austria. By 1999 Tremblay's practice also included painting installations exhibited as Hors-Champs at the Montreal Telegraph Building. He also exhibited there with Jean-Pierre Gauthier, Raymond Gervais, and John Heward in the 2000 multi-media exhibition on sound Montréal Télégraphe: le son iconographe which he co-curated with Louise Provencher. In 2001 an exhibition of black and white paintings Entre noir et blanc at Sherbrooke Museum of Fine Arts was followed by a second series Contretemps at Galerie Art Mûr in 2004. In 2010 Tremblay's photographs of windows in abandoned buildings were exhibited as Les tanneries at Association Artmandat in Barjols, France, and as Windows in 2011 at Galerie Division in Montreal. That year Montreal Museum of Fine Arts curator Diane Charbonneau organized a Tremblay photographic retrospective Tête-à-tête: Portraits of Artists, with 20 images from the museum's collection, including those of Francine Simonin, Michel Goulet, John A. Schweitzer, Manon de Pauw, and BGL. To coincide with the exhibition, a monograph of his work written by André Lamarre Richard-Max Tremblay. Portrait. was published by Éditions du passage. A Tremblay retrospective was also held in 2011 at the Maison des arts et de la culture de Brompton. In 2014 he was artist-in‐residence at the Canada Council for the Arts' Paris Studio.

In 2018 Tremblay lived and worked in Montreal.

== Style and philosophy ==
Known for his photographic portraits of artists, Tremblay's early images of Martha Townsend and Fernand Leduc feature face and hands. By 1986 his photographs of Betty Goodwin, John Heward and Pierre Soulages include studio shots to "introduce the work of the artist in the portrait." Other photographic series include windows of derelict buildings and empty, stacked boxes, a comment on the disappearance of archival records in a digital era. Tremblay described photography and painting as preservative, "acts of resistance against time", which are also "consequential acts that lead elsewhere, that sweep us forward." He also described his use of photography as either "a step in the creation of a photographic work" or as a "painting which is inconceivable without the photographic juncture". Also known for figurative art, Tremblay's early painting series Têtes (1985) was described as "anti-portraits", while later compositions of "heads and gestural blurrings" link photographic realism to abstract-lyricism. Recent paintings of Paris, Berlin or Venice also reference as metaphors mirrors or windows and the comcept of hidden and revealed. In 1975 Tremblay wrote, "I am fond of the theme of the black curtain... about showing what prevents you from seeing." His sources of inspiration include Renaissance art, philosophical novels such as The Unbearable Lightness of Being by Milan Kundera, as well as works by Franz Kafka, Samuel Beckett, and W. G. Sebald.

== Recognition ==
An elected member of the Royal Canadian Academy of the Arts, Tremblay is the recipient of the 2015 RCA Trust Award. He was also awarded the 2003 Prix Louis-Comtois for "excellence within the visual arts" by the City of Montreal and the Contemporary Art Galleries Association (AGAC). Known for photography, painting, and the creative "synergy and fusion" between the two, Voir journalist Matthieu Petit wrote that Tremblay's "signature lies in photographic and pictorial parallels, but also in the enigmas that he enjoys developing." Art reviewer Françoise Belu noted in his work a sense "of being and non-being", which Nancy Pedri described in Circa Art as "showing and hiding, the curtain and the motif". Noting the viewer's role in completing the staging or mis-en-scene, Vie des Arts critic Jean-Jacques Bernier described his work as "moving from the particular to the general or universal". Also recognized as a cinematographer, Tremblay's video "Gugging", co-written and produced with Anne-Marie Rocher, received the 1996 Special Jury Prize – International Festival of Films on Art and Pedagogy (UNESCO Paris, France).

== Photography books ==
- Laurin, Danielle; and Tremblay, Richard-Max. Raymonde April. Photographe. Éditions Varia, 2006. ISBN 9782896060290 Web.
- Morency, Catherine; and Tremblay, Richard-Max. Marie Chouinard. Chorégraphe. Éditions Varia, 2006. ISBN 9782896060337. Web.
- Raymond, Dyane; and Tremblay, Richard-Max. Jean Derome. L'homme musique. Éditions Varia, 2007. ISBN 9782896060412. Web.
- Jasmin, Stéphanie; Tremblay, Richard-Max. Michel Goulet. Sculpteur. Éditions Varia, 2007. ISBN 9782896060399. Web.
