= A. J. Casson =

Canadian painter in the Group of Seven (1898–1992)

A. J. Casson OC RCA
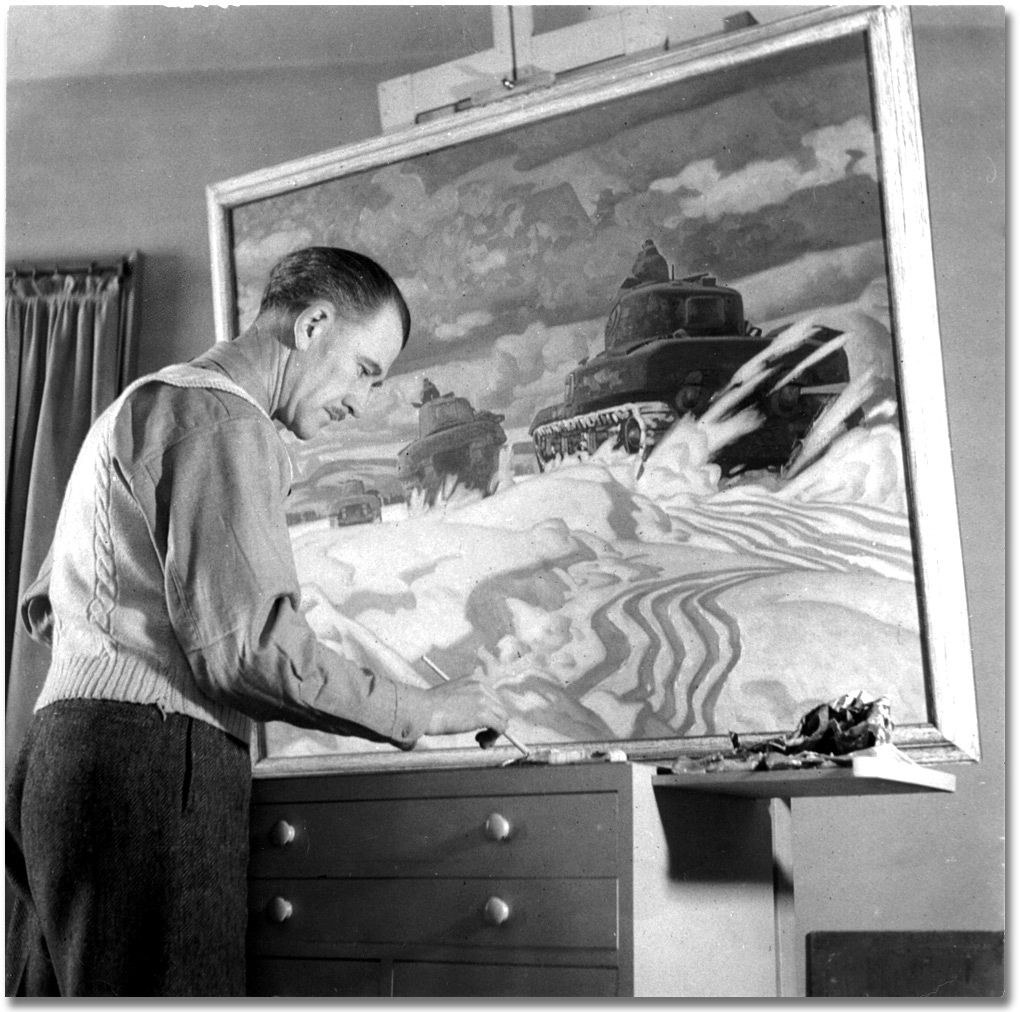
- Casson in 1943
- Born: Alfred Joseph Casson; May 17, 1898; Toronto, Ontario, Canada
- Died: February 20, 1992 (aged 93); Toronto, Ontario, Canada
- Known for: Painting
- Spouse: Margaret Alexandria Petry (m. 1924)

Alfred Joseph Casson OC RCA (May 17, 1898 – February 20, 1992) was a member of the Canadian group of artists known as the Group of Seven. He joined the group in 1926 at the invitation of Franklin Carmichael, replacing Frank Johnston. Casson is best known for his depictions in his signature limited palette of southern Ontario, and for being the youngest member of the Group of Seven.

== Life and career ==
Casson was born on May 17, 1898, in Toronto, Ontario. At age nine, he moved to Guelph, and to Hamilton at age fourteen. The first exposure he had to art was at Hamilton Technical School, where he was asked by his teacher to demonstrate for the class. His father sent him to work at age 15 as an apprentice at a Hamilton lithography company. In 1915, the family moved back to Toronto where his first art classes were private lessons with Harry Britton. Britton taught him about colour and how to use oils and watercolour, a medium he loved. At the same time as working, he attended evening classes at Central Technical School. The first public exhibition of his work was at the Canadian National Exhibition, in 1917.

He was hired by the commercial art/engravers firm Brigden's, owned by brothers George and Frederick Henry (Fred) Brigden. In 1919, Casson moved to Rous and Mann Ltd, where he was influenced by and assistant to Group of Seven member Franklin Carmichael to sketch and paint on his own. Carmichael and Casson then moved on to the first Canadian silkscreen printing firm, Sampson-Matthews Ltd, founded by artist J. E. Sampson and businessman C. A. G. Matthews, for which he worked from 1926 till 1958. After Carmichael left in 1932 to teach at the Ontario College of Art, Casson became their Art Director and in 1946 their vice-president.

During the 1920s, Casson continued to paint during his spare time alone and with the Group of Seven. He enjoyed painting using watercolour and in 1925, along with Carmichael and F. H. Brigden, founded the Canadian Society of Painters in Water Colour. After Frank Johnston, a Group of Seven member, left the group in 1921, Casson seemed like an appropriate replacement. In 1926, he was informed by Carmichael that he had become a member of the Group of Seven. In the same year, he also became an associate member of the conservative Royal Canadian Academy (he became its president in 1949). Carmichael also introduced Casson to The Arts and Letters Club of Toronto.

In 1924, Casson married Margaret Petry. His father died shortly after his marriage, and he had to take care of and support his widowed mother. After the end of the Group of Seven in 1932, he helped found the Canadian Group of Painters in 1933, along with several members of the Group of Seven who also became members of the Canadian Group of Painters, including Lawren Harris, Arthur Lismer, A. Y. Jackson and Franklin Carmichael.

Casson developed a painting style with clear colours, background designs, and a limited palette. His approach was what Lawren Harris had talked to him about - simplification and the elimination of all nonessentials. In 1952, he was elected into the National Academy of Design as an Honorary Corresponding member. In 1954, he was one of eighteen Canadian artists commissioned by the Canadian Pacific Railway to paint a mural for the interior of one of the new Park cars entering service on the new Canadian transcontinental train. Each mural depicted a different national or provincial park; Casson's was Algonquin Provincial Park. He "retired" in 1958 from Sampson-Matthews, at age 60, to paint full-time. He also was helpful as a special consultant to the Anti-Rackets Branch of the Ontario Provincial Police uncovering forgeries of Tom Thomson and the Group of Seven and many other historical Canadian artists.

A. J. Casson died on February 20, 1992, just three months short of his 94th birthday, and is buried on the grounds of the McMichael Canadian Art Collection, along with six other Group of Seven members.

== Honours ==
- 1940 full member Royal Canadian Academy of Arts (1940 elected president)
- 1942 winner, national competition for designing poster for a Victory Bond;
- 1948 Province of Ontario Award;
- 1954 Gold medal for distinguished service to advertising in Canada;
- 1957 Gold medal, University of Alberta;
- 1967 Silver Centennial Medal;
- 1969 RCA Medal;
- 1973 Fellow, Ontario College of Art;
- 1975 Honorary degree, University of Toronto;
- Officer of the Order of Canada

== Record sale prices ==
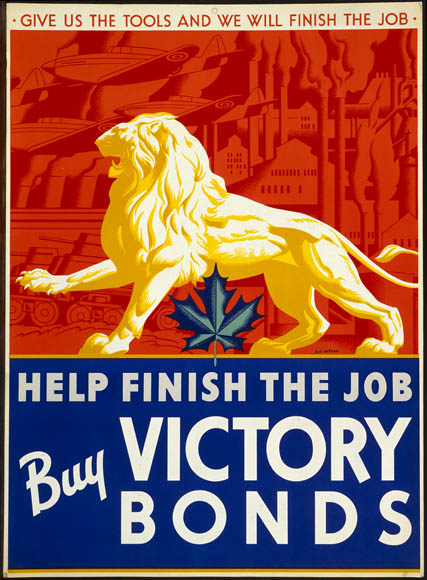
Casson's Give Us the Tools and We Will Finish the Job – Help Finish the Job – Buy Victory Bonds, 1941

A privately owned work of A. J. Casson's appeared on the May 26, 2008, airing of PBS's "Antiques Roadshow". According to the owner, the painting was given to her grandfather by Casson, his friend and neighbour at the time. The work appraised in the $25,000 to $35,000 range.

A large oil on canvas by the Group of Seven's A. J. Casson, Street in Glen Williams, sold for a record $542,800, including buyer's premium on June 1, 2010. The Casson – a leafy, autumnal portrait of Glen Williams, a small town near Toronto – carried a pre-sale estimate of $200,000–$250,000, the highest such valuation ever accorded a Casson canvas.

Canadian art critic and historian Paul Duval wrote in 1980, "Street in Glen Williams is unquestionably his key autumn portrayal." Bidding for Street in Glen Williams began at $180,000, then bounded in increments of $10,000, then $20,000 before reaching its hammer price of $460,000. The clinching bid came from a western Canadian buyer. The previous record for a Casson, $489,100, including premium, was also set by Joyner Auction, in May 2005.

On Wednesday, November 23, 2016, his Gathering Storm sold for $1,534,000 CDN (premium included) – the highest amount paid for a Casson painting to date.

At the Heffel Auction of Canadian, Impressionist & Modern Art, December 1, 2021, Casson's Pic Island, Lake Superior, an oil on board sketch, 9 3/8 x 11 1/8 in, 23.8 x 28.3 cm, estimated at $40,000 - $60,000, sold for: $481,250 (including Buyer's Premium). In 2026, the Heffel spring auction sold lot 118, Autumn on the York River, oil on canvas, 1959, 36 x 45 in, 91.4 x 114.3 cm, Estimate: $200,000 - $300,000 CAD, for: $931,250 (including buyer's premium).

Cultural offices
Preceded by Ernest Fosbery	President of the Royal Canadian Academy of Arts; 1948–1952	Succeeded by Robert Wakeham Pilot
