= William Malcolm Cutts =

Canadian artist (1857–1943)

William M. Cutts
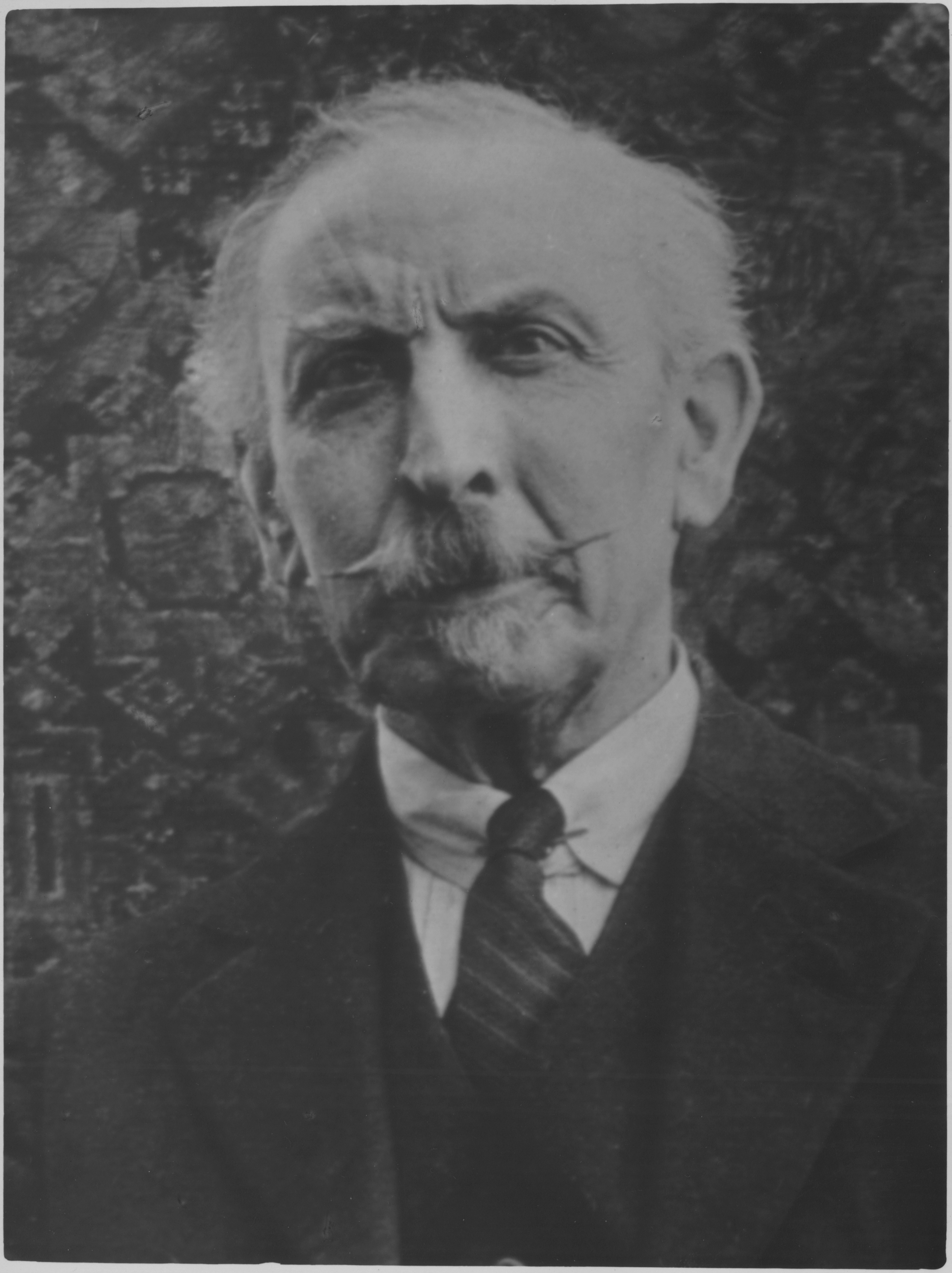
- William M. Cutts, A.R.C.A., 1930
- Born: William Malcolm Cutts; 16 December 1857; Allahabad, India
- Died: 29 January 1943 (aged 85)
- Education: self-taught
- Known for: painter of landscapes and marine studies
- Spouse: Charlotte Elizabeth Hogarth (m. 1882) Gertrude Spurr (m. 1909)

William Malcolm Cutts (December 16, 1857 – January 29, 1943) was a painter of landscapes and marine studies in oil and watercolour.

== Early life ==
Cutts was born at Allahabad, India, the child of an East India Company official. His father died in India during the Indian Rebellion of 1857 and Cutts and his mother moved to England where he attended primary school. As a boy of 13, he had a serious interest in painting. In 1870, he came to Canada with his mother and stepfather and settled in Stratford, Ontario, where he first began to work as an artist. He worked for several years as a fireman on the Grand Trunk Railroad, then moved to Toronto in 1880. He visited England for a short period to study painting.

== Career ==
On his return to Canada he painted portraits for the next 25 years. He visited Ontario towns as a portrait painter. He exhibited portraits, landscapes and marine studies (the latter two he began to paint around 1905) at the Royal Canadian Academy of Arts annual shows from 1891 to 1929. With his second wife, Gertrude Spurr Cutts, he lived at St. Ives, Cornwall, England, for three years (1909-1912) and sketched in southern England and Wales. He also painted in Jamaica and eastern United States along the Atlantic seaboard. The Cutts shared a studio in Toronto until 1915 when they settled in Port Perry, Ontario. Like his wife, he died in Port Perry, Gertrude in 1941 and William two years later at the age of 86.

== Memberships and collections ==
He was a member of the Ontario Society of Artists (1890) (life-member 1935), and showed with it from 1891 to 1928, as well as an Associate member of the Royal Canadian Academy of Arts (1907). He is represented in the following public collections: National Gallery of Canada, Ottawa; the Ontario Government Collection, Toronto; the St. James Club, Montreal; and the Robert McLaughlin Gallery, Oshawa.
