= Susan G. Scott =

Canadian artist (born 1949)

- Born: 1949 (age 76–77); Montreal, Quebec, Canada
- Known for: Painter
- Spouse: François Séguin
- Elected: Royal Canadian Academy of Arts (2013)
- Website: Artist website

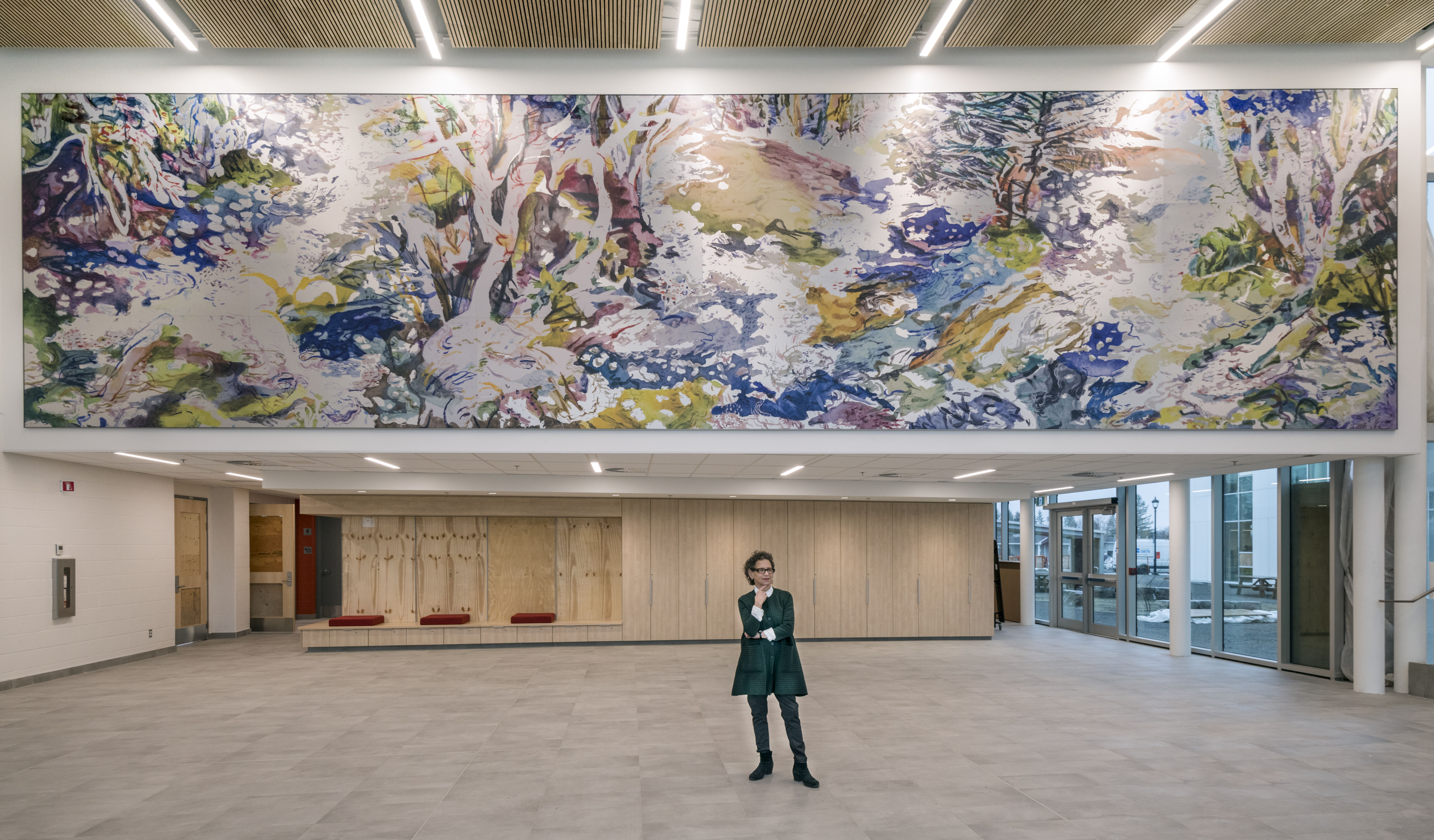
Susan G. Scott in front of her mural, "Ruisseau."

Susan G. Scott RCA (born 1949) is a Canadian artist known for both contemporary figurative painting and, more recently, landscapes. Her work is found in national and international public collections. She was elected to the Royal Canadian Academy of Arts (RCA) in 2013.

Throughout her career, Scott has explored various themes, styles and mediums within painting. She uses "traditional codes, often blending them with those of other media – altering her format or adding text – to bend the narrative away from passivity towards communication." Following a brief period of gestural landscapes in the early 1980s, Scott focused on narrative figurative painting with protagonists in dramatic mise en scene inspired by literature or art history. For curator Jane Young, her work "conveys much emotional information through the colours, compositions and titles used." Art historian and critic Hedwidge Asselin noted her skill with light: "the painter's gaze encompass the forms and volumes, the distances in space, the colors, harmonies, contrasts and values". Described by curator Joan Murray as a "master of colour", in 2014 Scott set aside the figure to convey – using gestural brush strokes on a white ground – "nature as a living, changing subject."

== Early life and education ==
Susan G. Scott was born in Montreal on October 28, 1949. The daughter of Canadian Nathan Scott and American Betty Greenberg, she grew up in Montreal and, at age 14, first took drawing from Dennis Burton. In 1966 she attended the Pratt Institute in New York City and studied with figurative artist Sidney Tillim. The following year, she returned to Montreal to take painting with John Fox at the Saidye Bronfman Centre for the Arts (1967–68) and print making with Albert Dumouchel at the École des Beaux-Arts, Montreal (1968–69). She completed her fourth-year art diploma at the Boston Museum School (1969–71) and was awarded a summer scholarship to the Skowhegan School of Painting and Sculpture in Maine. While at Skowhegan, she met students from the New York Studio School and enrolled there the following semester. At the Studio School, Scott was introduced to the philosophy of artist Hans Hofmann and, influenced by visiting artists Alex Katz and Philip Guston, continued to draw and paint from observation. She graduated from the New York Studio School (1971–72) with a Masters of Fine Art equivalent.

Scott has taught painting at the Emily Carr College of Art (1980–81), Banff School of Fine Arts (1982), University of Victoria (1982–83), Mount Allison University (1984), Nova Scotia College of Art and Design (1985) and, since 1984, at Concordia University in Montreal.

== Career ==
1980 - 2000 While teaching at the Emily Carr College of Art, Scott's gestural harbourfront scenes caught the attention of Christopher Varley who curated her 1982 solo exhibition Vancouver Series at the Edmonton Art Gallery. In 1983 Scott's Kafka-inspired, polaroid-format figurative series Description of a Struggle was exhibited at Bernard Jacobson Gallery (Los Angeles CA). This series – with figures likened to Matisse and Picasso – was included in the touring exhibition Susan G. Scott: Works from 1974 to 1983 viewed at the Surrey Art Gallery, Art Gallery of Greater Victoria, Saidye Bronfman Centre (Montreal QC), Justine M. Barnicke Gallery (Toronto ON), and Agnes Etherington Art Centre (Kingston ON). In 1988 Scott experimented with layered glazes on a toned ground, imprimatura, in the series Blindman's Bluff (1988–91). Based on Goya's painting of the same name, the exhibition toured Galerie Nikki Diana Marquardt (Paris, France) and, in 1989–91, the Southern Alberta Art Gallery (Lethbridge AB), Mount St. Vincent University Art Gallery (Halifax NS), and Daniel Saxon Gallery (Los Angeles CA). In 1993 Scott's feminist interpretation of Joseph and His Brothers The Dreamer Series – influenced by Harold Bloom's and David Rosenberg's Book of J – exhibited at Galerie Michel Tétreault (Montreal QC).

2000 - During the early 2000s, Scott – inspired by Cocteau's celebrated novel Les enfants terribles – created a sequential series "of characters who appear from painting to painting". Exhibited with large wall drawings, hand-painted text and sketchbooks at the Visual Art Centre (Montreal QC) in 2004, the series also toured the Maison de la Culture (Pointe-aux-Trembles QC), Clarington Art Centre (Bowmanville, ON), Dalhousie University Art Gallery (Halifax NS) and the Justine M. Barnicke Gallery (Toronto ON). At this time, Scott's monochromatic portraits of children – with "frantic action figures looming out of the background as if they were figments of the child's teeming imagination," – were favorably reviewed by Gary Michael Dault in The Globe and Mail. In 2008 Scott incorporated her vocations – artist and teacher – in the two diptych series Young Artist and Student Days (2007–08). These paintings – investigations of subject matter – were exhibited at Galerie d'Art du Parc (Trois-Rivières QC) and FOFA Gallery of Concordia University. In 2011, Scott's large scale Oasis Series – of children within colour-saturated landscapes – was exhibited at Galerie Eric Devlin (Montreal). Following trips to Asia and the study of Chinese philosophy and landscape techniques, Scott returned to "quick light brush strokes" on a white, stone-paper ground – for the 2014 water series Notations – exhibited at Beaux-arts des Amériques (Montreal QC).

In 2021 Scott received a commission through the program for the integration of the arts into architecture and the environment from Québec's Ministère de la Culture et des Communications for a large mural in the mezzanine of a new primary school in Saint-Hyacinthe, Quebec. The new school, along with its completed mural was inaugurated in 2023.

Scott, a dual Canada-US citizen, lives in Montreal and has a summer residence in Vermont. She meets regularly with the Vermont Northeast painters group and teaches in the Department of Studio Arts at Concordia University. She is married to production designer François Séguin and they have two children.

== Recognition and Contribution ==
In 1982 Edmonton Art Gallery curator Christopher Varley wrote: "Rather than simplifying her work to achieve pictorial or expressive unity – and suppressing drawing, spatial and compositional complexity, and strong contrasts in value, chroma or hue to do it – she seeks unity within complexity, and loads her paintings and drawings with a wide variety of pictorial incidents." Best known for her figurative work, in 1984 curator Jane Young of Surrey Art Gallery noted: "Scott experiments with public statements about personal emotions, exposing and exploiting the incongruity of socially prescribed behaviour which excludes the expression of our most deeply felt emotions. She does this by exaggerating the emotional content of the painting by using specific colours and compositional motifs." In the Los Angeles review of Scott's AIDS series Forgotten Histories, Marlena Donohue wrote: "These paintings crackle with the intense heat of sensuality and a good deal of anguish." Joanne Latimer in her review "Beyond Blasphemy?" described Scott's subversive reinterpretation of the biblical Joseph as Josephine in The Dreamer Series where: "innocuous domestic scenes are, instead, clips of conspiracy in action." Art critic Lorne Falk wrote that her technique of imprimatura and glazing in the Blindman's Bluff Series: amplifies the process of (re)constructing what she wants to say." In 2011, Montreal Gazette reviewer John Pohl noted her incorporation of nature within figuration: "puts Scott within the Canadian landscape tradition". Considered a pivotal Quebec artist, in La peinture au Québec depuis les années 1960 anthologist Robert Bernier wrote: "Susan G. Scott has mastered the art of generating in action, a psychological pattern.... tensions, emotions, and thoughts which, with time, develop fully in the viewer's mind." Bernier concluded that over the years: "Her language has become more complex, painterly and aesthetic. Scott shows an extraordinary capacity for reinventing herself while preserving the rigorous nature that marks her entire body of work."

Scott was elected to the Royal Canadian Academy of Arts (RCA) in 2013.

== Collections ==
Scott's work is found in major public collections including the Canada Council for the Arts Art Bank (Ottawa ON), Musée du Québec (Quebec QC), Bibliothèque nationale du Québec (Montreal QC), Musée d'art contemporain de Montréal, Montreal Museum of Fine Arts, Art Gallery of Nova Scotia (Halifax NS), Confederation Centre Art Gallery (Charlottetown), Robert McLaughlin Gallery (Oshawa ON), University of Alberta Art Gallery, Southern Alberta Art Gallery (Lethbridge AB), Nickle Arts Museum (Calgary AB), Art Gallery of Greater Victoria, as well as Communauté urbaine de Montréal, Musée d'art de Joliette, Musée Pierre-Boucher (Trois-Rivières QC), College of the North Atlantic (Stephenville NL), Dalhousie Art Gallery (Halifax NS), Acadia University (Wolfville NS), Owens Art Gallery (Sackville NB), Leonard & Bina Ellen Art Gallery (Montreal QC), Agnes Etherington Art Centre (Kingston ON), Justina M. Barnicke Gallery (Toronto ON) and Red River Community College (Winnipeg MB).

Her work is found internationally in the Collection du Fonds régional d'art contemporain d’Île-de-France (Paris, France), Canada - Israel Cultural Foundation (Jerusalem, Israel), and Houston Baptist University (Houston TX). Her work is also found in corporate collections including the Senvest Collection of New Canadian Art, Exxon Corporation (Toronto, ON), Gaz Métropolitain (Montreal QC), Loto-Québec (Montreal QC), Teleglobe Canada(Montreal QC) and Telesat Canada (Toronto ON).
