= Henrietta Hancock Britton =

English-born Canadian artist and educator

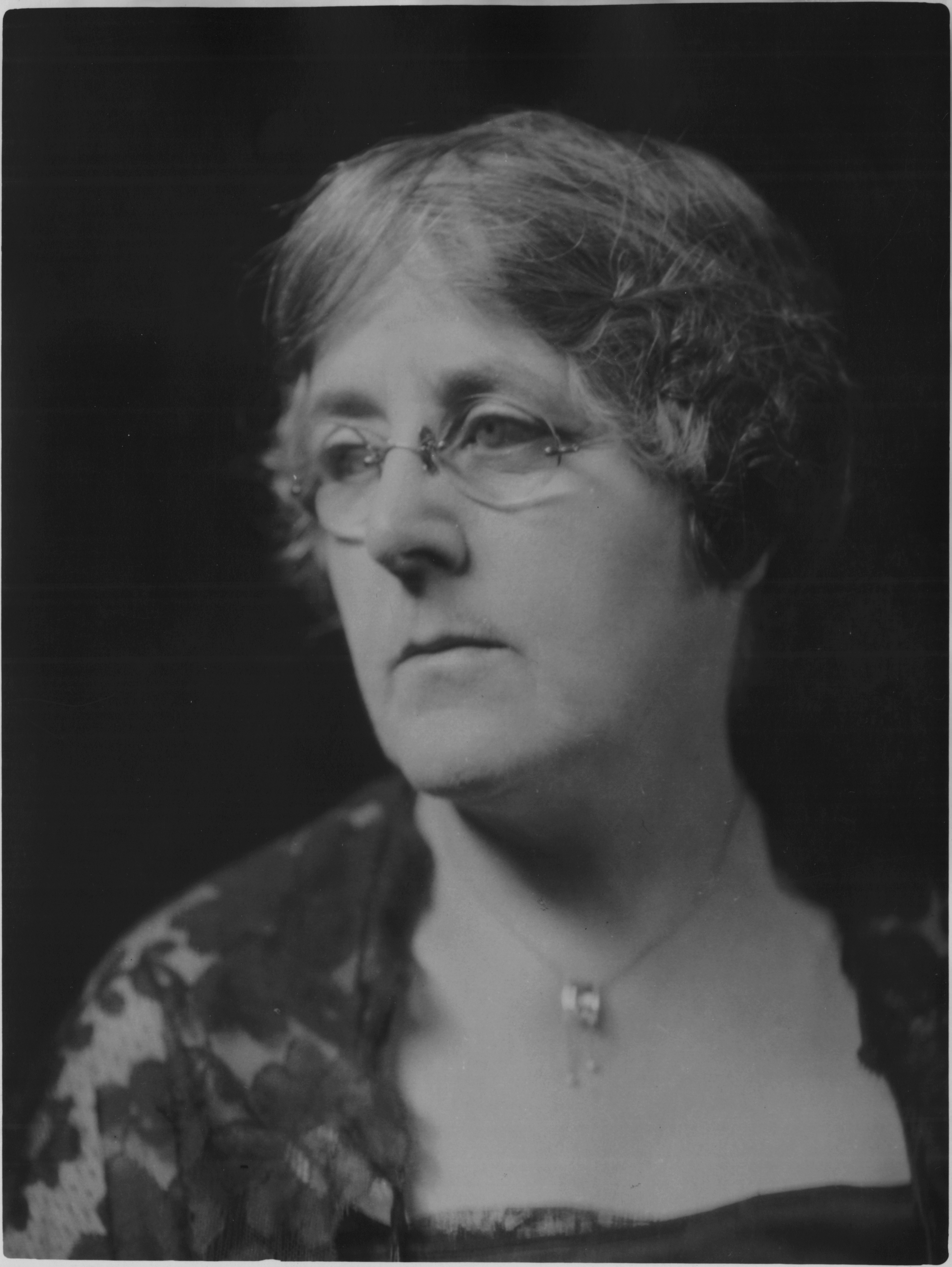
- Henrietta Britton, 1930
- Born: Henrietta Hancock; May 20, 1873; Ealing West, West London
- Died: July 27, 1963 (aged 90)
- Education: William Cruikshank
- Alma mater: Ontario School of Art and Design
- Known for: Painter
- Spouse: Harry Britton

Henrietta Hancock Britton (May 20, 1873 – July 27, 1963) was an English-born Canadian artist and educator.

== Early life and career ==
Born Henrietta Hancock in Ealing West, West London on May 20, 1873, she arrived in Canada with her parents in 1874. The family lived in both Brandon, Manitoba and Toronto. She studied art at the Ontario School of Art and Design and also took private lessons with William Cruikshank. Britton was an active member of the Art Student's League in Toronto, serving as its treasurer. She taught art at the Bishop Strachan School and Moulton Ladies' College. Britton was the director of Art at Brandon College from 1906 to 1911 and was a founding member of the Brandon Art Club in 1907. She married painter Harry Britton while studying art with him in England. The couple lived in Cornwall before moving to Canada and settling in Toronto in 1914.

From 1905 to 1946, she exhibited with the Royal Canadian Academy and with the Art Association of Montreal from 1945 to 1946. She was known for painting landscapes, seascapes and portraits.

Britton died in Toronto at the age of 90 on July 27, 1963.

Her work is included in the collection of the National Gallery of Canada and in private collections.
