= BGL =

BGL, or bgl, may refer to:

- Baby Girl Lisa from 90 Day Fiancé: Before the 90 Days, season four
- Blood glucose level
- BGL, the former code for the Bulgarian lev
- BGL, the IATA code for Baglung Airport, Gandaki Province, Nepal
- bgl, the ISO 639-3 code for the Maleng language of Laos and Vietnam
- BGL, the license plate code for Landkreis Berchtesgadener Land, Bavaria, Germany
- BGL, the National Rail code for Bugle railway station, Cornwall, UK
- BGL (artists), a Canadian artist collective
- BGL BNP Paribas, a bank based in Luxembourg
- BGL Group, a financial services company based in Peterborough, UK
- Bombe Guidée Laser, a guided bomb developed by Matra in France
- Brown Gibbons Lang & Company, American middle market investment bank
- Busan–Gimhae Light Rail Transit, a transit system in South Korea
