= Clarence Dick =

Canadian artist (born 1946)

Clarence "Butch" Dick
- Born: 1946 (age 79–80)
- Known for: Master Carver of Coast Salish totem poles

Clarence "Butch" Dick RCA (Yux'way'lupton) (born 1946) is a Lekwungen artist, educator and activist residing in Victoria, British Columbia, Canada.

== Education ==
Dick attended residential school in Penelakut Island, Indian day school, and public and private schools in Victoria. He studied design at the Vancouver School of Art in the 1960s, as well as at Camosun College.

== Career ==
Dick began his career in education first at Shoreline Middle school (District 61), teaching First Nations arts & culture in the early 1980s. He was an assistant professor at University of Victoria, where he taught an Indigenous Learning course. He is also regarded as a Master Carver of Coast Salish totem poles. Dick is now an elder of the Songhees First Nation community.

=== Public art ===
In 2014, Dick was the designer of the Rock Bay Mural Project on Government and Princess streets in Victoria, BC, in collaboration with Darlene Gait. The project was a collaboration between the Songhees and Esquimalt First Nations, BC Hydro and Tervita Corporation.

"Two Brothers" Spirit Poles in Spirit Square, Victoria, BC are a collaboration between Butch Dick and his son, Clarence Jr. The painted wood poles were erected in 2009 and are 18 feet high. The pair comprises a traditionally designed pole by Dick and a contemporary design by Clarence Jr.

"Signs of Lekwungen" is a series in collaboration between Butch Dick, and his sons, Clarence and Bradley. The works are located at seven different sites around Victoria, B.C. with significance to the history of the Lekwungen (Songhees and Esquimalt) people. The sculptures each depict a Coast Salish spindle whorl in bronze-cast, originally carved with close-grain Red Cedar and featuring a different design for each work. The bronze castings are anchored to brown powder coated aluminum poles, and are mounted on granite and concrete plinths. The sculptures are 2.5 metres in height and weigh 1000 lbs.

=== Collections ===
His work is included in the collections of the British Museum and the Art Gallery of Greater Victoria.

== Awards ==
Dick was awarded the lifetime achievement award by Leadership Victoria in 2015. He was the first aboriginal elder to receive this award.
