= Lucius Richard O'Brien =

Canadian artist

Lucius O'Brien
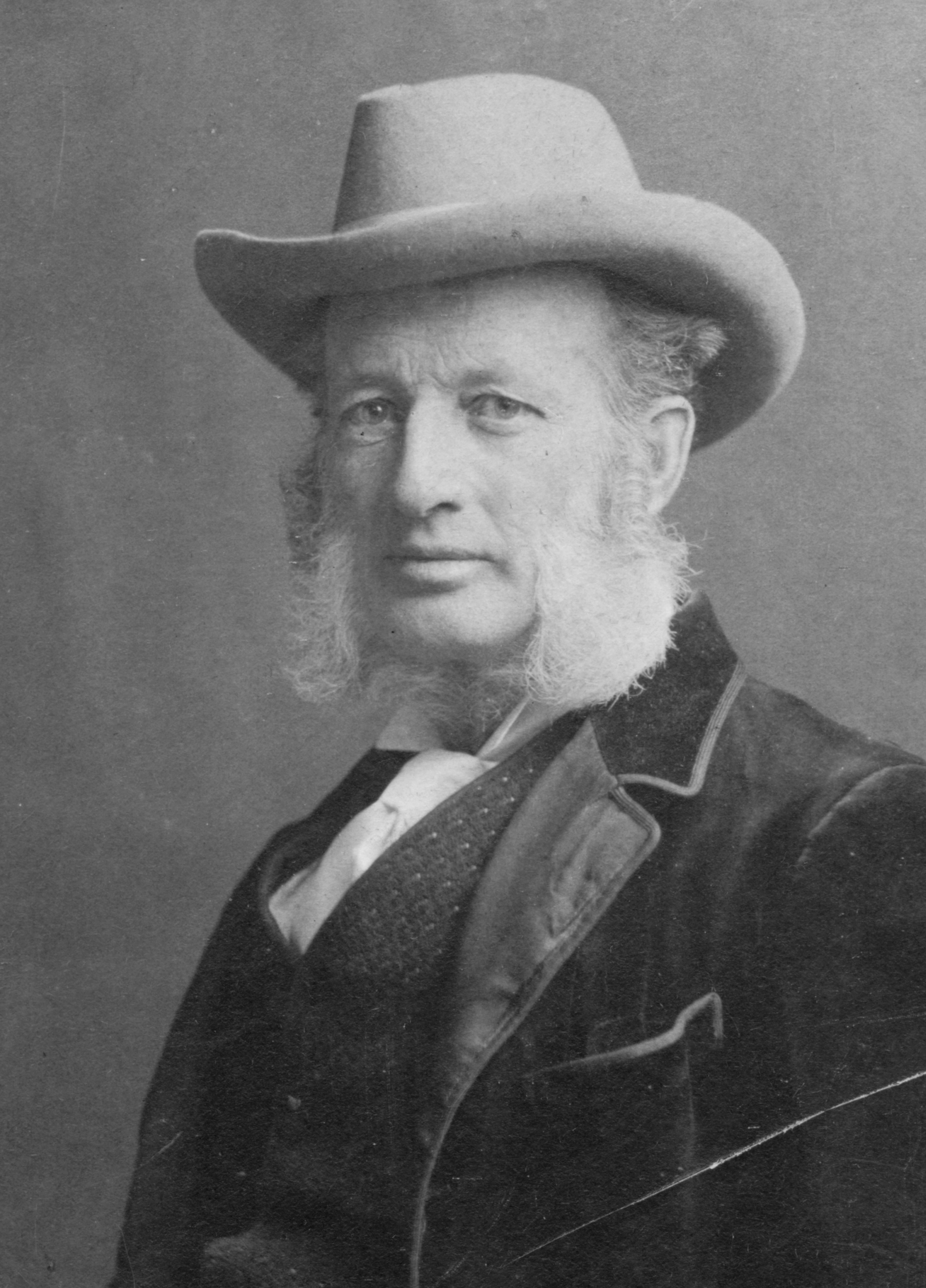
- Lucius O'Brien, c. 1885
- Born: Lucius Richard O'Brien; 15 August 1832; Shanty Bay, Upper Canada
- Died: December 13, 1899 (aged 67); Toronto, Ontario, Canada
- Known for: Painter
- Notable work: Sunrise on the Saguenay (1880)

Lucius Richard O'Brien (or L. R. O'Brien as he was known) RCA (15 August 1832 – 13 December 1899) was the most prominent Canadian artist of his generation, exhibiting with, and a member of, the newly established Ontario Society of Artists. He became vice-president of the society in 1873 and was chosen to be the first president of the Canadian Academy of Arts by the Governor General, the Marquess of Lorne, from 1880 to 1890. In oils and watercolour, O’Brien painted landscapes of Quebec and Ontario.

== Life and career ==
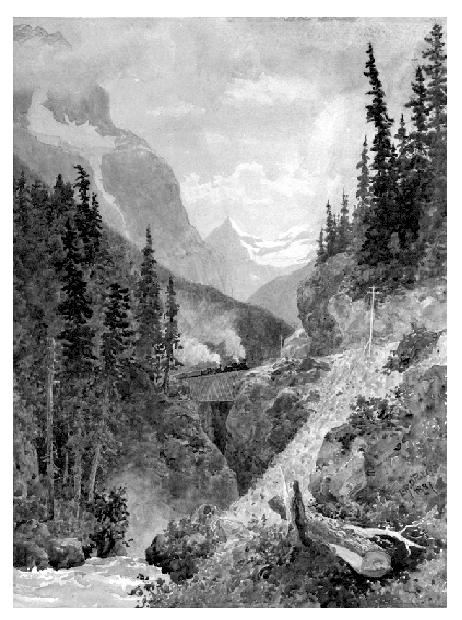
Kicking Horse Pass, 1887, from the Canadian Rocky Mountains

O'Brien was born in Shanty Bay, Upper Canada, a village his father founded on the shore of Lake Simcoe.

His father was Edward George O'Brien R.N who retired from the Navy in 1830 and went out to Canada and settled in Shanty Bay. He became a J.P and Colonel of Militia. He married Sophie Gapper and died in 1875. He was a descendant of Sir Edward O'Brien, 2nd Baronet. (Note: Lineage: • Lucius Richard O'Brien (15 August 1832 – 13 December 1899) • Edward George O'Brien (1799-1875) • Lucius O'Brien (1765-1840) • Donough O'Brien • Sir Edward O'Brien, 2nd Baronet (7 April 1705 – 26 November 1765))

He graduated from Upper Canada College in 1847 and is said to have directly started work in an architect's office where he did drafting. In 1852, he won two prizes at the Ontario Provincial Exhibition for painting. In 1856, he was listed as an artist in Toronto's City Directory.

In 1872, Lucius began landscape painting, and quickly excelled in the genre. Two year later, after a dispute with artist John Arthur Fraser, O'Brien took Fraser's position as vice-president of the Ontario Society of Artists, a position he held until 1880, when he became founding President of the Royal Canadian Academy of Arts.

He is best known for landscape paintings from across Canada in oil and watercolour, such as, Sunrise on the Saguenay of 1880, which was the first academy diploma piece in the Royal Canadian Academy's first annual exhibition.

In 1880, O'Brien began to work on Picturesque Canada (1882–84), which he edited. O'Brien toured across Canada, meeting with the country's artists and commissioned artists to produce woodblock prints for illustration of the text. O'Brien's art, and in particular Picturesque Canada, aimed to celebrated Canada's natural landscape united under confederation.

O'Brien was one of the first artists invited to travel to and paint the Rocky Mountains on the newly completed Canadian Pacific Railway in 1886.

He died in Toronto, Ontario at the age of 67.

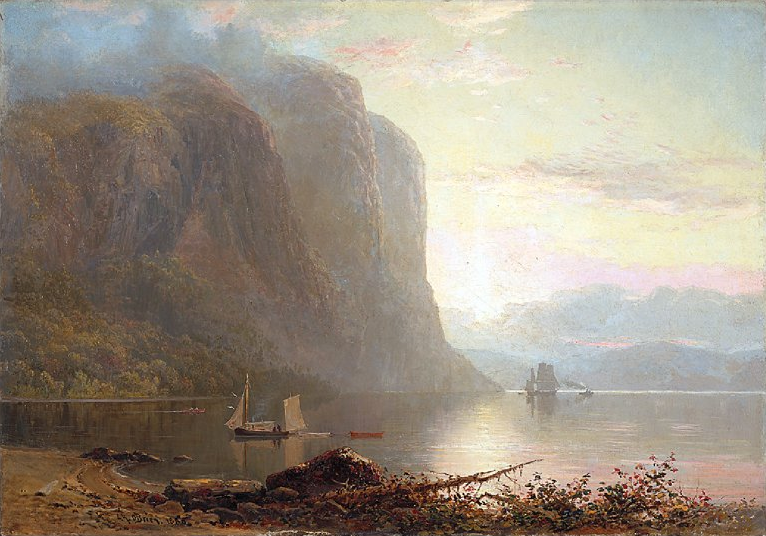
Sunrise on the Saguenay, Cape Trinity (1880). Oil on canvas. 90 x 127 cm. National Gallery of Canada

== Notes ==
Cultural offices
Preceded by —	President of the Royal Canadian Academy of Arts; 1880-1890	Succeeded by Otto Reinhold Jacobi
