= Christopher Varley =

Canadian art historian, curator, art dealer (born 1950)

- Born: Christopher John Varley; September 19, 1950; Vancouver, Canada
- Education: Simon Fraser University (grad. 1972)
- Known for: Canadian art historian, curator, private art dealer, art and cultural commentator
- Spouse: Sandra Shaul (married 1986)

Christopher Varley (born 1950) is a Canadian art historian, curator, private art dealer, art and cultural commentator as well as a generous donor to public collections. He is the grandson of F. H. Varley. His weekly on-line letters have become something of a "community education project for those of us working in the Canadian art world," wrote one gallerist about Varley's commentary.

== Career ==
Christopher Varley was born in Vancouver and received his B.A. from Simon Fraser University, graduating in 1972. He was the Assistant Curator at the Vancouver Art Gallery, 1974–1977 and the Head Curator at the Edmonton Art Gallery, 1979–1983. In 1983, he moved to Toronto and became a private art dealer specializing in historical Canadian art as well as a freelance curator and consultant. He has donated work to galleries such as the McMaster Museum of Art and The Image Centre at Ryerson University in Toronto to which he gave an entire collection of 542 photographs by various Canadian makers from the 19th century to the 20th.

== Writing ==
Varley is the author of F. H. Varley (National Gallery of Canada 1979); F.H. Varley: a centennial exhibition (Edmonton Art Gallery, 1981); Hans Hofmann (1880-1966): an introduction to his paintings (Edmonton Art Gallery, 1982); Morrice to Borduas: painting in Montreal from 1900-1950 (Edmonton Art Gallery, 1982); Winnipeg west: painting and sculpture in western Canada, 1945-1970 (Edmonton Art Gallery, 1983); William Nicoll Cresswell (1818-1888): Man from Seaforth (with Barry Fair, London Regional Art Gallery, 1986); Aba Bayefsky revisited: a retrospective exhibition (Koffler Gallery, 1989); The Development of the modern market for historical Canadian art (Typescript of a speech given at the Robert McLaughlin Gallery, Oshawa, on April 15, 2004) and other catalogues, He also writes articles on subjects such as the Group of Seven for the Canadian Encyclopedia and reviews shows for Galleries West magazine.

His writing on F. H. Varley has been respectfully reviewed by his peers as has his writing on the Contemporary Arts Society which was said to be "a tribute to his energy, enthusiasm and insight".

His e-mail commentary in existence since 2010 with a set list of recipients covers a wide variety of topics, politics, society, economics and finance, along with art and culture with individual artist profiles on artists such as Arthur Lismer. He also has discussed the art market and auction sales of art.

== Memberships ==
- Canadian Museums Association, 1982–1983;
- Alberta Association Architects, 1982–1983;
- Friends of the Canadian Collection, Art Gallery of Ontario;
- Founding Director, The Funding Network (Toronto) 2005–2015;
- Art Dealers Association of Canada, 2010–2013

== Awards ==
- Canada Council Travel Grant, 1982;
- Western Canada Art Association Publishing Award, 1984
