= Lynda Gammon =

- Born: 1949; Port Alberni, British Columbia, Canada
- Education: University of British Columbia, York University
- Known for: Photographer, sculptor, Installation artist, Conceptual artist

Lynda Gammon RCA (born 1949) is a Canadian artist and educator based in Victoria, British Columbia.

== Life ==
Lynda Gammon was born in Port Alberni, British Columbia, and grew up in Vancouver, British Columbia. She received her Bachelor of Arts from the University of British Columbia and completed her Master of Fine Arts degree at York University (1983). She is a member of the Royal Canadian Academy of Arts and is also on the Board of Directors at Open Space. Gammon is currently an associate professor at the University of Victoria in the Visual Arts Department. Gammon established flask in 2004, a project dedicated to distribute and produce book works by artists and writers.

== Work ==
Gammon's work involves a variety of forms and processes, including drawing, assemblage, performance, and installation. Her work explores the similarities and differences of represented and presented spaces. She does so through her use of photography as the embodiment of flat, represented space, while sculpture is the physical, presented space. She explores the interplay between remembered places and photographs of them.

== Selected exhibitions ==
- Silent as Glue, Oakville Galleries
- Recently Constructed Works, Mercer Union
- Prima Materia, McMaster Museum of Art
