= John A. Schweitzer =

Canadian artist

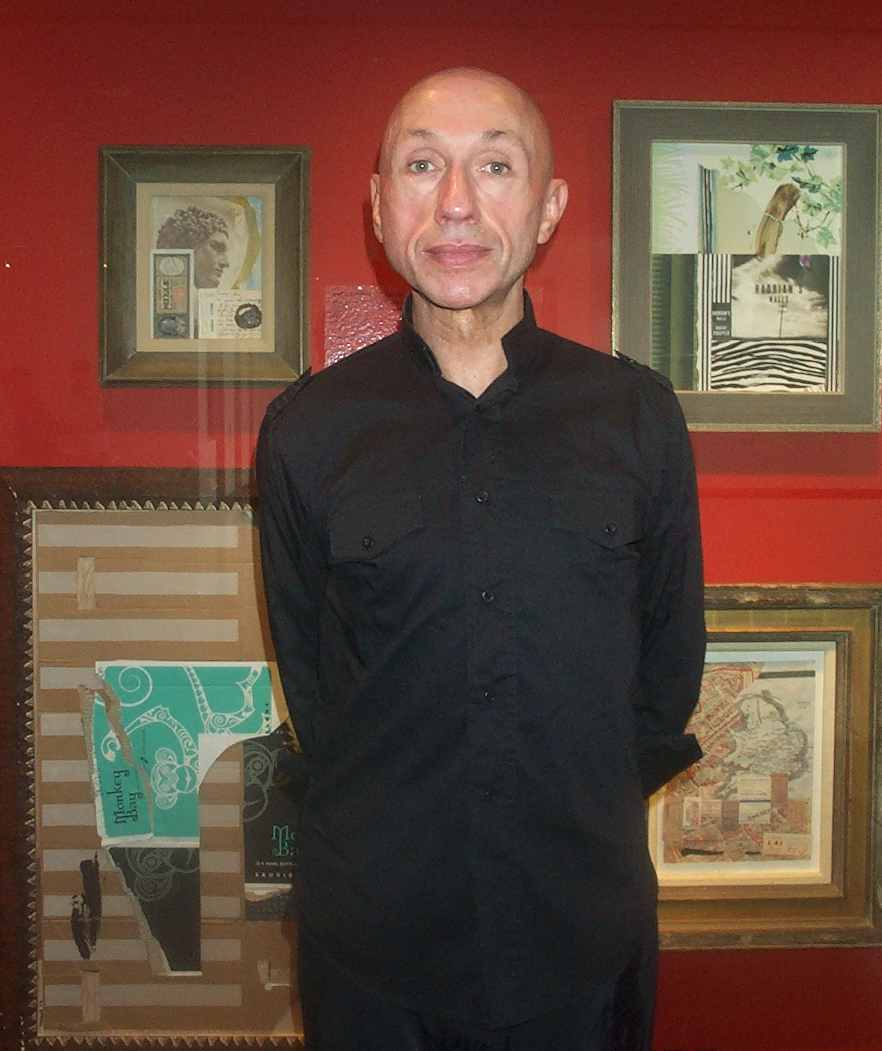
- John A. Schweitzer in front of his work exhibited at the Montreal Museum of Fine Arts on July 26, 2016
- Born: 1952 (age 73–74); Simcoe, Ontario
- Known for: Collage
- Awards: Queen Elizabeth II Golden Jubilee Medal (2002), Erster Stelle Award – Schrift und Bild in der modernen Kunst (2004), Honorary Doctor of Laws (LLD) — The University of Western Ontario (2011)
- Elected: Royal Canadian Academy of Arts (2003), Ontario Society of Artists (2006)

John A. Schweitzer RCA is a Canadian artist known for mixed-media collage incorporating text. He was awarded the Queen Elizabeth II Golden Jubilee Medal in 2002, first place at the international exhibition Schrift und Bild in der modernen Kunst in 2004, and an Honorary Doctor of Laws from The University of Western Ontario in 2011. He was elected to the Royal Canadian Academy of Arts (RCA) in 2003 and to the Ontario Society of Artists (OAS) in 2006. His work is found in the collections of the National Gallery of Canada (Ottawa ON), Canadian Museum of History (Gatineau QC), Art Gallery of Ontario (Toronto ON), Musée national des beaux-arts du Québec (Quebec QC), Musée d'art contemporain de Montréal, Montreal Museum of Fine Arts, Glenbow Museum (Calgary AB), Winnipeg Art Gallery, Beaverbrook Art Gallery (Fredericton NB), The Rooms Art Gallery of Newfoundland and Labrador (St. John's NL), and the National September 11 Memorial & Museum (New York NY).

Schweitzer explored painting, sculpture, photography, installation and performance art but adopted collage as his primary medium by 1991. His work references literature, art and architecture through a "plethora of coloured paper, torn posters, newspaper fragments, envelopes, stickers, postage stamps, cardboard boxes, shopping bags, straw, bits of metal, shards of pottery and other objets trouvés." Organized in thematic series, Schweitzer's subject matter ranges from Virgil's Aeneid in Sunt Lacrimae Rerum (1991) to 9/11 terrorism in Fresh Kills: XXIV Elegies (2003). Inspired by abstract expressionist Robert Motherwell and writers from T.S. Eliot to Proust or Goethe, Schweitzer incorporates ephemera to "instill or arouse... an intellectual curiosity... as well as sharpen and heighten visual literacy." Art critic John K. Grande described his work as "subtly enigmatic, these autobiographical, wry and witty narratives allude to history, time, life."

== Career ==
John Andrew Schweitzer was born in 1952 in Simcoe, Ontario, and grew up in the rural community of Delhi, Ontario. With ambitions to become a writer, he enrolled at The University of Western Ontario in 1971. However following an Art History course, he studied painting under Paterson Ewen and was awarded a gold medal in Visual Arts and Honours Bachelor of Arts degree in 1974. He continued his studies in Toronto under multidisciplinary artists Tim Whiten and Vera Frenkel at York University and graduated with a Masters of Fine Arts in 1978. Following graduation Schweitzer lived in New York City where he performed in Vera Frenkel's film Signs of a Plot, viewed at the Museum of Modern Art (New York NY), and then in Zurich. As both artist and art dealer during the early 1980s, he travelled frequently to Europe and America. In 1984 Schweitzer exhibited at The New Museum in New York City where he was awarded Third Prize by curator Marcia Tucker. That same year, he moved to Montreal and opened the contemporary art gallery, Galerie John A. Schweitzer where he exhibited the work of such local artists as Richard-Max Tremblay and international artists such as Robert Mapplethorpe.

As gallerist, Schweitzer introduced young artists such as Richard-Max Tremblay, with "thought-provoking exhibitions and animated social events". As artists Louis Comtois and Robert Mapplethorpe were infected with HIV, in 1986 he organized the first AIDS benefit art auction in Canada, and established the John A. Schweitzer Foundation in 1994. As artist, in 1997 Schweitzer exhibited at the Museum of Contemporary Art, Los Angeles, and in 1998 he joined The Kootz Gallery, New York, which represented Motherwell, Hofmann, and Conrad Marca-Relli. Increasingly known for collage, a series of reviewed solo exhibitions held at the Goethe Institute in Toronto, the University of Western Ontario in London, as well as in Montreal at the Visual Arts Centre and Galerie Christiane Chassay established his reputation. He also continued to work as art critic or theorist and, in 2001, was appointed adjunct professor at McGill University's School of Architecture. To devote more time to art, in 2004 he closed Galerie John A. Schweitzer. That year, as Canada's representative, Schweitzer exhibited with Jenny Holzer, Roni Horn, Julian Schnabel and Lawrence Weiner at Schrift und Bild in der modernen Kunst (Hanover, Germany) where he was awarded First Place (Erster Stelle). He was also awarded public art commissions for the Montreal General Hospital, Jewish Public Library of Montreal and Astral Media in Montreal, Baycrest Health Sciences, Sunnybrook Health Sciences Centre, Mount Sinai Hospital, Toronto and North York General Hospital in Toronto, and the Paul Davenport Theatre in London, Ontario. In 2014 Schweitzer donated Fresh Kills: Elegy XXIV 24 to the National September 11 Memorial & Museum in New York City, where he was represented by Nasser & Co., a dealer of Picasso, Warhol, and Basquiat. Also that year, a solo exhibition was held at The University of Western Ontario to commemorate the 40th anniversary of his graduation.

== Collections ==
Schweitzer's work is found in many public collections including: the National Gallery of Canada (Ottawa ON), Library and Archives Canada (Ottawa ON), Canadian Museum of History (Gatineau QC), Canadian Museum for Human Rights (Winnipeg MB), Textile Museum of Canada (Toronto ON), Art Gallery of Ontario (Toronto ON), Musée national des beaux-arts du Québec (Quebec QC), Musée d'art contemporain de Montréal, Montreal Museum of Fine Arts, McCord Museum of Canadian History (Montreal QC), Glenbow Museum (Calgary AB), Winnipeg Art Gallery, Beaverbrook Art Gallery (Fredericton NB), and The Rooms Art Gallery of Newfoundland and Labrador (St. John's NL). Internationally his work is found at the National September 11 Memorial & Museum (New York NY), Stonewall Library and Archives (Fort Lauderdale FL), and World Erotic Art Museum Miami. His work is also collected in depth at The University of Western Ontario (London ON), York University (Toronto ON), Université de Montréal, and McGill University (Montreal QC). Many of his posters can be found in the AIDS Collection held at the Osler Library of the History of Medicine, McGill University.

== Recognition ==
By the late 1990s, Schweitzer was recognized for his graphic style and complex themes. Curator Ricardo L. Castro described Schweitzer's distinctive "L" leitmotiv of verticals and horizontals as a merger of Western and Eastern influences, and the primacy of image over text as reflective of Renaissance paragone. Castro also compared Schweitzer's use of literary references to Robert Motherwell, printed text to Jasper Johns, colour to Hans Hofmann, and evocative power to Cy Twombly. Art critic John Stracuzza in Parachute commented on the "evident sprezzatura – a sense of both disciplined craft and spontaneous fantasy – in his work." Reviewer Melanie Reinblatt described his use of objet trouvé as both literal and associative: "In his work each collage fragment is the bearer of meaning, and [when] placed in proximity to another fragment, will alter meaning by various degrees." For Vie des arts reviewer Monique Brunet-Weinmann, his work defies a simplistic reading: "its merit lies in challenging... not modernity and history, but the modernist conception of modern history." In 2005 art critic Henry Lehmann of the Montreal Gazette wrote, "Schweitzer comes off as one of Canada's most unusual talents, a supreme master of contradiction, illusion and disillusion."

In recognition of his artistic achievement, Schweitzer was awarded the Queen Elizabeth II Golden Jubilee Medal in 2002 and was elected to the Royal Canadian Academy of Arts in 2003 and to the Ontario Society of Artists in 2006. His work is included in Government of Ontario's collection and was displayed in the Premier's office in 2013. Also known for his financial support of the arts, Schweitzer received a national citation for philanthropy from Governor General Adrienne Clarkson in 2005. A longtime benefactor of his alma mater (Purple and White Award 2003), The University of Western Ontario inaugurated The John A. Schweitzer Gallery in 2004 and awarded him an honorary Doctor of Laws degree in Arts and Humanities (LLD) in 2011. The John A. Schweitzer Fonds are archived at both Western and McGill universities.

== Contribution ==
A career pluralist, Schweitzer raised the profile of contemporary art and collage in Canada. As director of Galerie John A. Schweitzer, he held the first Canadian solo exhibitions of photographers Robert Mapplethorpe in 1984 and Duane Michals in 1989, exhibited collages by Robert Motherwell and David Hockney, as well as work by Frank Gehry, Francis Bacon, Lucian Freud, Hans Hofmann, Andy Warhol, Helen Frankenthaler, Keith Haring, and Gerhard Richter. As guest curator, Schweitzer authored critical texts for the exhibitions Lise Gervais: Thirty Years, 1953-1983 at the Foreman Art Gallery, Bishop's University (Lennoxville QC) in 1983, Fritz Brandtner: A Centenary Exhibition, 1896-1996 at Galerie Kastel (Montreal QC) in 1996, American Works on Paper: Berthot to Warhol, Galerie d'Avignon (Montreal QC) in 1998, the exhibitions L'Esprit Art Déco and Cocteau: Painter and Poet held at the University Club of Montreal in 2004, as well as the 2006 exhibition Quebec on Paper: Selected Quebec Members of the Royal Canadian Academy of Arts held at the John B. Aird Gallery (Toronto ON). As art collector, Schweitzer curated the 2003 exhibition of his own collection "Of Collage: The Artist as Collector" at Stewart Hall (Montreal QC), as well as the 2008 exhibition marking the centenary of collage, Acute Liaisons, at the McGill School of Architecture (Montreal QC). As art critic and expert, Schweitzer served on juries for the 1991 Prix Louis-Comtois (Association des galleries d'art contemporain de Montréal), the 2002-05 Orange and Lemon Prize (Sauvons Montréal), 2004 Emblem Competition - Canadian Hungarian Artists Collective (Montreal QC), and for the 2006 Thomas More Institute Annual Art Exhibition (Montreal QC). Schweitzer served on art acquisition committees for the Maimonides Hospital Foundation (Montreal QC) in 1993–94, UNICEF Québec (Montreal QC) in 1995–2004, Université de Montréal in 1999–2002, and the Sunnybrook Health Sciences Centre (Toronto ON) in 2009–10. Schweitzer was also a Canadian and International Art consultant to the auction houses Sotheby's Canada, Hôtel des encans (Montreal QC), Walker's Auctions (Ottawa ON), and Heffel Gallery, as well as to Le Méridien International (Montreal QC) in 2014.
