= Suezan Aikins =

Canadian artist

- Born: 1952 (age 72–73); Montreal
- Education: Nova Scotia College of Art & Design, Tōshi Yoshida
- Known for: graphic artist, painter, sculptor
- Elected: Royal Canadian Academy of Arts
- Website: www.suezan-aikins.com

Suezan Aikins RCA (born 1952), is a Canadian printmaker, painter and sculptor living in Nova Scotia.

== Life and work ==
Aikens was born in Montreal in 1952. She studied at Mount Allison University, the Ontario College of Art and the L' École du Musee des Beaux Arts, then earned a BFA at the Nova Scotia College of Art & Design.

Aikins and her husband, Sam Rogers spent a year at the Yoshida Woodblock Print Studio in Tokyo, studying Japanese woodblock technique under the direction of Tōshi Yoshida. Following the traditional division of labor between carver and printer, Aikins prepares her images and carves the blocks, while Rogers completes the printing tasks.

Aikins draws on both Western and Eastern art traditions in her work. She states, "I wanted to use all I had learned of abstraction's explorations of color and space in landscapes where light and shade echo and evoke spiritual states."

Aikins' work is represented in the collections of the Canada Council Art Bank, the Nickle Arts Museum - University of Calgary, and the Art Gallery of Nova Scotia,

Aikins was made a member of the Royal Canadian Academy of Arts in 1990
