= Lew Yung-Chien =

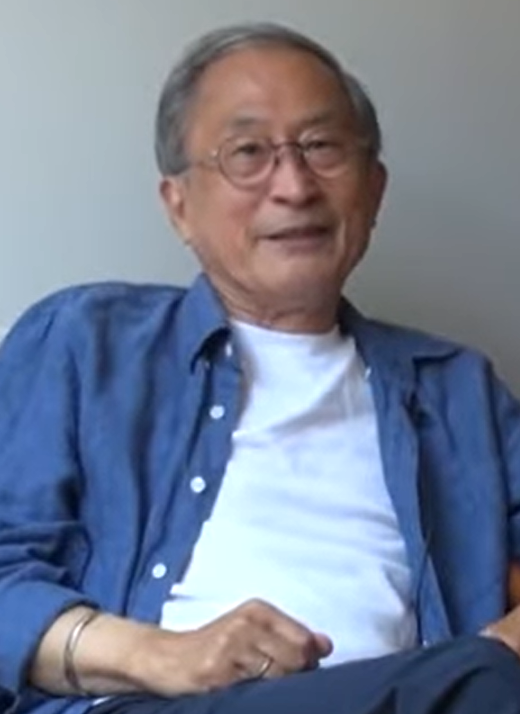
- Born: 劉榮黔; 1938 (age 87–88); Shanghai, China
- Known for: Photographer
- Awards: Arts Society of China 2011 Award (Taiwan)
- Elected: Royal Canadian Academy of Arts (RCA)

Lew Yung-Chien RCA (1938) is a Taiwanese-Canadian photographer, artist, and author. Known for his painterly nature photographs, Lew is a member of the Royal Canadian Academy of Arts (RCA). A published author, he wrote and photo-illustrated L’esprit du taï-chi and received the Arts Society of China 2011 Award (Taiwan) for his illustrated book 60 Chinese Cookies. He has lectured and exhibited in Quebec, California, and China.

== Life and career ==
Lew Yung-Chien (Yung-Chien Lew) was born in Shanghai, China, in 1938. As a youth, Lew studied traditional Chinese calligraphy and dry brush painting, before attending the College of Fine and Applied Arts at the National Taiwan Normal University. While in Taipei he also studied tai chi under master Cheng Man-ch'ing and incorporated the discipline into his work and life. He graduated from university in 1961 with a Bachelor of Fine Arts (BFA) degree, and, from 1963 to 1967, studied graphic design at the École supérieure des arts modernes in Paris. He then moved to Montreal where he worked as a graphic designer under Claude LeSauteur at Cabana Séguin Inc. In 1975 Lew co-founded the studio Communication et Design Hablutzel & Yung Inc. with Peter Hablutzel, and was the firm's president and sole proprietor by 1979. Known for creating logo designs for Bell Canada Enterprises (BCE), Noverco, and SNC-Lavalin, he was interviewed for the design magazine G in 1989. Throughout his corporate career, Lew painted as well as practised calligraphy and pottery.

In 1995 Lew began to focus on photography, intercultural communication, and tai chi. A frequent traveler to Taiwan and China as well as California, Lew photographed landscapes and abstract patterns within nature. A practitioner of tai chi, he continued to study the discipline in Beijing. A cross-cultural adviser to corporations and governments, Lew also guest lectured at leadership workshops at McGill University's School of Management, where he introduced tai chi as a means to improve self-knowledge, design, and problem-solving skills. He also taught tai chi at McGill's Institute for the Public Life of Arts and Ideas, and at the university's Faculty of Medecine. Lew also combined photography with tai chi philosophy and practice in the book L’esprit du taï-chi, published in 2009. He also taught the course Tai Chi and the Brush at the Visual Art Centre in Westmount (Montreal). In 2011 Lew's book of drawings, calligraphy, and philosophical sayings 60 Chinese Cookies was published in Montreal. Awarded the Arts Society of China 2011 Award (Taiwan), the book was published in New York as 60 Fortune Cookies in 2014.

In recognition of his work, Lew was selected artist-in-residence at the Banff Centre of the Arts and exhibited there in 2001. A solo exhibition of his photographs and paintings was also held at the City of Westmount's Gallery at Victoria Hall in 2006. Since then he has exhibited at Silicon Valley Asian Art Center (Santa Clara CA), and at Qinzheart Gallery in Hangzhou China. In recent years Lew developed a photographic theory called "Swiftism" advocating spontaneity with the use of a camera like a brush. Recognized for his photography, Lew was elected to the Royal Canadian Academy of Arts (RCA), and participated in the association's new-members' exhibition at gallery Beaux-arts des Amériques (Montreal) in 2015.

== Books ==
L’esprit du taï-chi

In 2009 Lew's book on photography and tai chi L’esprit du taï-chi: sentir que les poissons sont contents was published. Written in collaboration with journalist Michel P. Dufour, the book was described in the Bibliothèques de Montréal's recommendation list as: "the text is accompanied by photography, calligraphy, and illustrations which inspires calm, contemplation and wonder... to enhance health and harmony between body and spirit." The book was reviewed in the literary magazine Nuit Blanche as "a superb introduction to Tai Chi".

60 Chinese Cookies

60 Biscuits Chinois / 60 Chinese Cookies is described as "60 simple observations or insights, each illustrated with one of his drawings... with the author’s thoughts expressed in English, French and through Chinese calligraphy." Reviewed in The Gazette (Montreal), Monique Polak wrote: "Lew reminds us of things we already knew, but need to remember ("A careless word is like a careless match") and asks questions ("What is most precious to you?") that will linger in our minds long after we’ve put his book away."

Glimmerings of Eternity

Lew's book of photographs taken throughout the world, Éclats d’éternité / Glimmerings of Eternity, was published in 2017. Accompanied by 50 inspirational thoughts presented in English, French, and Chinese, the book is described as both a humorous and philosophic exploration of life's meaning. Published in 2017, Nuit Blanche reviewer Jean-Paul Beaumier, wrote that at times Lew's photographs "translate what is concealed from view or invite viewers to lose themselves within their beauty."
