= Harry Britton =

Canadian artist (1878-1958)

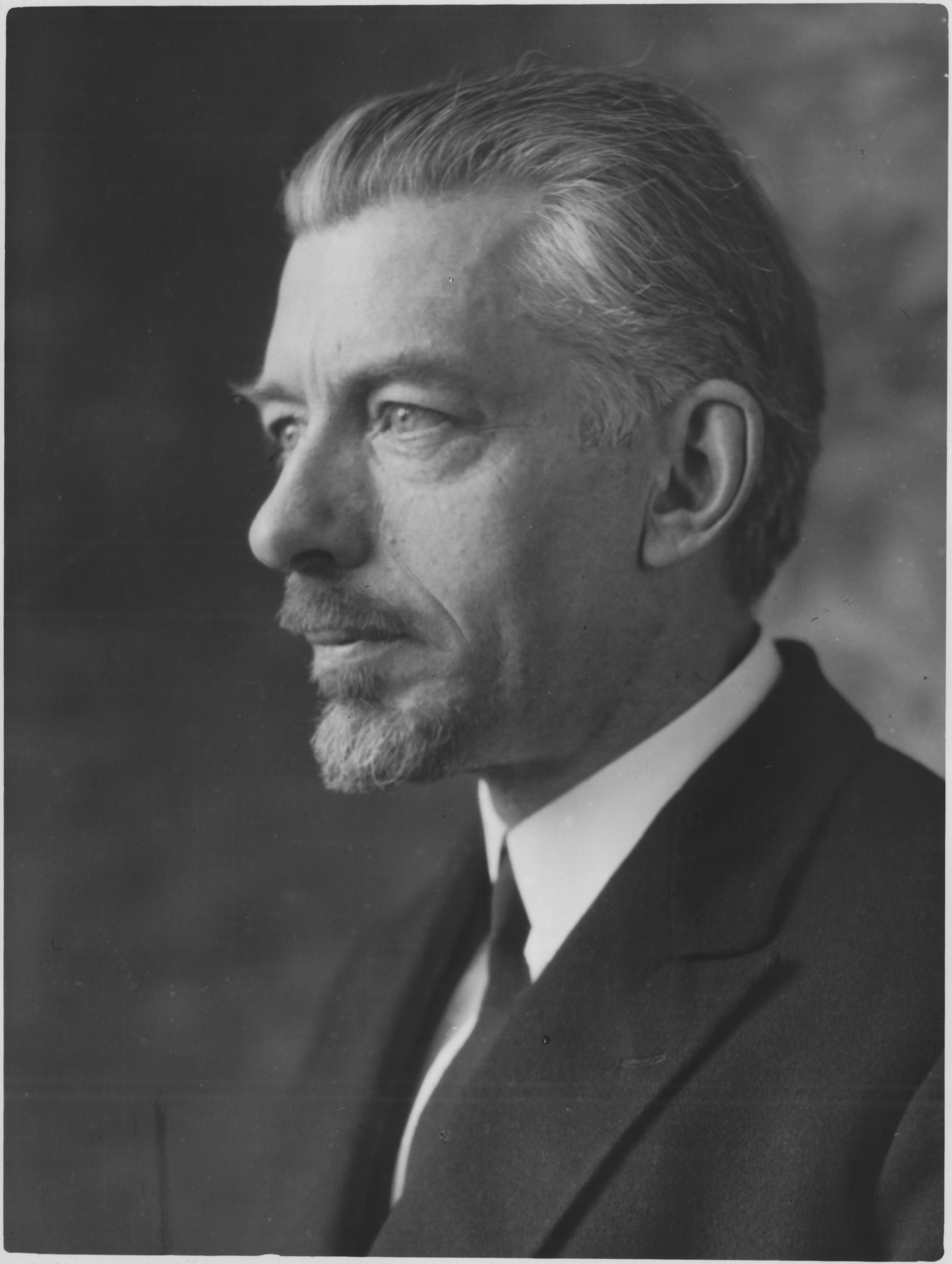
- Born: September 23, 1878; Cambridge, England
- Died: July 23, 1958 (aged 79)
- Known for: painter, educator
- Spouse: Henrietta Hancock (m. 1914)

Harry Britton RCA (September 23, 1878 – July 23, 1958) was an English-born Canadian painter and educator.

The son of George Britton and Mary (Tredgett) Cooper, he was born in Cambridge and came to Toronto with his parents in 1881. Britton attended school in Toronto and went on to study with Farquhar McGillivray Knowles. From 1909 to 1911, he studied at the Heatherley School of Fine Art. While teaching in Cornwall, he met his future wife Henrietta Hancock; the couple married in 1914. They returned to Toronto later that year. They returned to England in 1921, living there until 1925. They next moved to Nova Scotia, living there until 1934, when they returned to Toronto.

Britton was elected to the Royal Canadian Academy of Arts in 1934. He participated in exhibitions with the Academy, as well as the Ontario Society of Artists and the spring shows of the Montreal Museum of Fine Arts.

He died in Toronto at the age of 79.

His work is included in the collection of the National Gallery of Canada.
