= William Nicoll Cresswell =

English-Canadian painter (1818-1888

William Cresswell
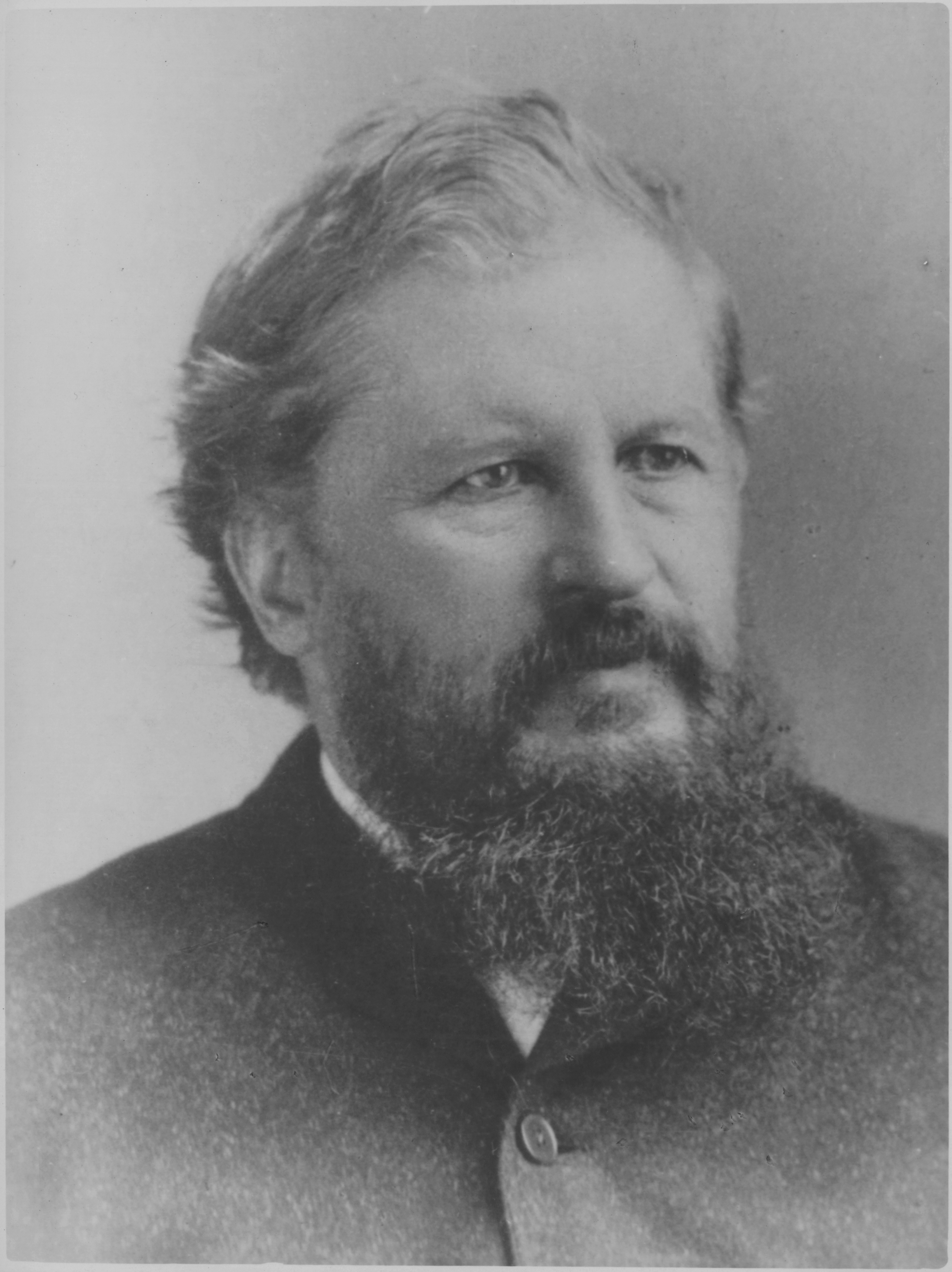
- Born: William Nicoll Cresswell; 12 March 1818; Shoreditch, Middlesex, England
- Died: 19 June 1888 (aged 70); Seaforth, Ontario
- Education: Possibly studied with E. W. Cook, London, England
- Spouse: Elizabeth R. Thompson

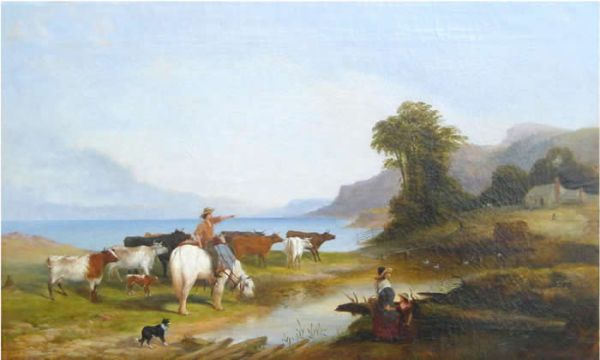
The homecoming, oil painting from 1864

William Nicoll Cresswell RCA (12 March 1818 – 19 June 1888) (his middle name is also given as "Nichol") was an English painter who emigrated to Canada in 1848. He is best known for his landscape and marine paintings done in watercolour or oil in Canada.

== Biography ==
William Nichol Cresswell was born in Shoreditch, London. After studies with several British painters (possibly E. W. Cook and William Clarkson Stanfield), he emigrated in 1848 to Canada West, where he settled with his family in Tuckersmith Township (later Seaforth, Ontario) in Huron County on a remote farm. In 1865, part of the family lot came into the possession of the artist and he ordered the bricks to build his house. The following year he married Elizabeth R. Thompson.

Cresswell probably did little farming because he was first and foremost a painter. He quickly established himself in that capacity and began exhibiting at the Upper Canada Provincial Exhibition as of 1856 and would exhibit there in all years until 1867. He travelled extensively in Canada: to Georgian Bay in 1865, through Québec and New Hampshire in 1866, to Lake Nipigon in northern Ontario in 1876, and in the 1880s he visited the Maritimes and spent some time on the Gaspé Peninsula, and travelled to Grand Manan in New Brunswick.

Cresswell continued to show his work at various exhibitions in Upper Canada. In 1874, he was elected a member of the Ontario Society of Artists, and in 1880, he was a founding member of the Royal Canadian Academy of Arts. He also showed his work in London, England, in the Colonial and Indian Exhibition of 1886.

In 1887, he fled the cold climate to southern California, where he spent the winter. He even planned to move there permanently, but died on 19 June 1888 of an inflammation of the lungs at the age of 70 at his home in Seaforth before consolidating these plans.

== Work and influences ==
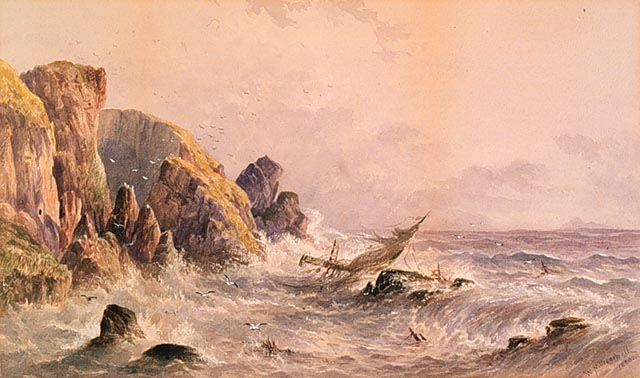
The last of the brig, watercolour painting from 1880.

Cresswell's paintings are mostly landscape scenes in rural or even wilderness settings, animal scenes, or maritime topics showing primarily coastal scenes from the Atlantic. Especially in the latter, the influence of Stanfield—himself a noted painter of maritime scenery—has been noted by Harper. In time, the hard luminosity of his early paintings developed into a broader, more generalized handling. Like Albert Bierstadt, he depicted a timeless wilderness in which light played a semi-religious role. Daniel Fowler is the first artist in Canada with whom a friendship is recorded and Cresswell probably knew others such as Robert Whale. In Canada, Cresswell began teaching the young Robert Ford Gagen in 1863, and thirteen years later also the then sixteen years old George Agnew Reid.

== Bibliography ==
- Fair, Barry (1986). The Cresswell Family in England, William Nicoll Cresswell. London, Ontario: London Regional Art Gallery.
- Varley, Christopher (1986). The Canadian Life, William Nicoll Cresswell. London, Ontario: London Regional Art Gallery.
- Gagen, R.F. (1986). Appendix 1, William Nicoll Cresswell. London, Ontario: London Regional Art Gallery.
