= BGL (artists) =

Canadian artist collective

BGL is a Canadian artist collective composed of Jasmin Bilodeau (b. 1973, Lac-Mégantic, QC), Sébastien Giguère (b. 1972, Arthabaska, QC ) and Nicolas Laverdière (b. 1972, Québec, QC). The artist collective have been active since 1996 since completing their studies together at Laval University in Québec City, Canada.

== Work ==
BGL is known for their self-referential and in situ installations. Their art is in direct dialogue with contemporary culture. BGL's projects vacillate between the boundaries of destruction and excess. The trio subtly challenges political notions through absurdist installations and performances. The artist collective produce art that engages in social criticism and in that way is reminiscent of the work by General Idea (1969–1994). BGL seeks through its work, to challenge the boundaries between art and life. Their artwork focuses on the realization that preoccupies itself with social and humanitarian concerns and that suggests a critique of the society in which they take part. BGL is concerned with the values encouraged by consumer culture, with attention of its effect on identities, institutions, and public space, as the fiction created by media, television and cinematography, that imposed on the viewer, is already fabricated and thus exhibits a hegemony that puts the viewer asleep.

As finalists for the Sobey Art Award in 2006, BGL have exhibited nationally and internationally, at the Casino Luxembourg, Luxembourg; Bunkier Sztuki Gallery of Contemporary Art, Krakow, Poland; Galerie Toni Tápies, Barcelona; The Model, Sligo, Ireland; the Art Gallery of Alberta, Edmonton; Royal Ontario Museum, Toronto; Mass MOCA, North Adams; and the National Gallery of Canada. The art of BGL is included in many private and public art collections as the Musée national des beaux-arts du Québec, the Montreal Museum of Fine Arts, National Gallery of Canada and the Museum of Contemporary Canadian Art (Toronto). In 2015 the artist collective represented Canada at the 56th Venice Biennale in Venice, Italy. The Biennale was curated by Nigerian curator, Okwui Enwezor, entitled, 'All The World's Futures' with the Canadian pavilion commissioned by National Gallery of Canada's Marc Mayer and Yves Théoret, with curator, Marie Fraser. BGL also exhibited in the 9th Havana Biennale, Havana, Cuba (2006); and in 2007 at the 'End of The World Biennial' in Ushuaia, Argentine, also in Nuit Blanche, Paris, (2011).

In 2007 the National Gallery of Canada acquired BGL's 'The Discourse of Elements' (2006) of this body of work many significant projects are created by BGL from 1998 to 2006.

In 2015, BGL represented Canada at the 56th Venice Biennale, the most prestigious contemporary art exhibition. BGL's installation Canadassimo filled the Canada Pavilion with thousands of objects to emulate a 1970s corner store and artist's studio, as a comment on consumerism.

== Exhibitions ==
=== Recent solo exhibitions ===
- Canadassimo, Canada Pavilion, Venice Biennale, Venice, Italy, 2015.
- Illingworth Kerr Gallery, (Nuit Blanche), Calgary, Alberta, 2012.
- VOLTA NY
- Minding the garden, Centre de design de l'UQAM, Montréal, QC, 2010.
- Solos, Rodman Hall, St Catherines, ON, 2010.
- New Sellution, Diaz Contemporary, Toronto, ON, 2009.
- Postérité, Parisian Laundry, Montréal, QC, 2009.
- Marshmallow+Cauldron+Fire=, Contemporary Art Gallery, Vancouver, BC, 2009.
- Les bénéfices du doute, Number 9, Don River, Toronto, ON, 2008.
- Artistique Feeling, Centre culturel Canadien à Paris, France, 2008.
- Sensuel et non tangible, Vu, Québec, QC, 2008.
- Commercial pleasure, Diaz Contemporary, Toronto, ON, 2007.
- La senteur de mes mains/the marks of my hands, Koffler gallery, Toronto, ON, 2007.
- Le discours des éléments, centre d'artistes l’Œil de Poisson, Québec, QC, 2006.
- Effet de mode et autres pirateries du genre, Galerie Optica, Montréal, QC, 2006.
- Se la jouer commercial, Art Mûr, Montréal, QC, 2006.
- Need to believe, Mercer Union, Toronto, ON, 2005.
- Petit spectacle, centre d'art Orford, Magog, QC, 2003.
- Le Regard de l'autre, Le Lieu, Québec, QC, 2002.
- A L'abri des arbres, Musée d'art contemporain de Montréal, QC, 2001.
- Profession : arbre de Noël, Galerie le Lobe, Chicoutimi, QC, 2001.
- Abondance difficile à regarder, Hall du Musée du Québec, Québec, QC, 2000.
- Entretenir le tangible, Galerie Plein Sud, Longueuil, QC, 2000.

=== Selected group exhibitions ===
- Oh, Canada, MassMoCA, North Adams, MA, 2012.
- Nuit Blanche, Paris, France, 2011.
- CAFKA, Biennale de Kitchener, Ontario, 2011.
- The Dorm, The Model, Sligo, Ireland, 2010.
- La Colonie / 25 ans de l'Œil de Poisson, Deschambault, Québec, 2010.
- Sobey Award, Musée d'art contemporain de Montréal, QC, 2010.
- Waterpod Archipelago, Occurrence, Montréal, QC, 2010.
- Making it work/ mettre en œuvre, Galerie d'art Leonard et Bina Ellen, Montréal, 2009.
- Waterpod, summer Project, New-York, USA, 2009.
- Manœuvres\ Maniobres, Galerie Toni Tàpies, Barcelone, Espagne, 2009.
- Flagrant délit/ Caught in the Act, Espace Shawinigan, Shanwinigan, 2009.
- Flagrant délit/ Caught in the Act, Musée des Beaux-Arts du Canada, Ottawa, 2008.
- C'est arrivé près de chez vous, Musée national des beaux-arts du Québec, Québec, 2008.
- Le Club, Espace 400 eme, Québec, 2008.
- Les 15 ans du Prix Videre, Centre d'exposition de Baie-St-Paul, Baie St-Paul, 2008.
- Vue sur Québec, collaboration Jump Ship Rat et Biennale de Liverpool, Liverpool, Angleterre, 2008.
- Domaine de L'angle II, Nuit Blanche, Toronto, 2008.
- Québec gold, Reims, France, 2008.
