= Gertrude Spurr Cutts =

Canadian artist (1858–1941)

Gertrude E. Cutts
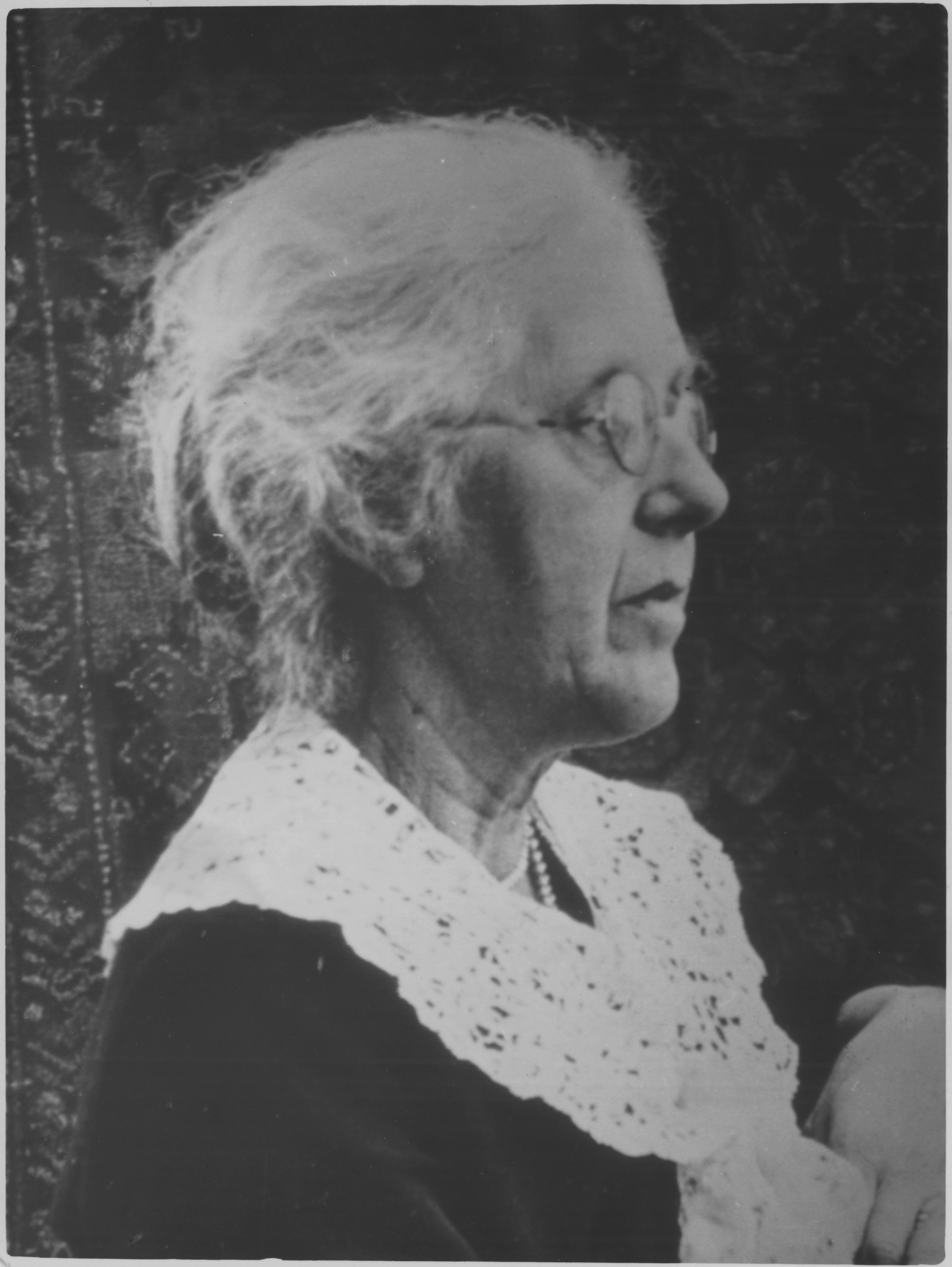
- Gertrude Spurr Cutts in 1930
- Born: Gertrude Eleanor Spurr; 1858; Yorkshire
- Died: 1941 (aged 82–83); Port Perry, Ontario, Canada
- Education: Art Students League of New York
- Known for: Painting
- Spouse: William Cutts

Gertrude Eleanor Spurr Cutts (1858–1941) was a Canadian artist.

== Career ==
Born in Scarborough, North Yorkshire, England, Gertrude E. Spurr began her career as an artist in England, exhibiting her work with the Royal Society of British Artists and the Society of Women Artists.

In 1890, Cutts emigrated to Canada, moving to Toronto, and opened an art studio. Cutts exhibited her work at the Palace of Fine Arts at the 1893 World's Columbian Exposition in Chicago, Illinois. In 1900, she studied at the Art Students League of New York with George Bridgman, Birge Harrison, and John F. Carlson. She married William Cutts in 1909, and the couple spent three years painting in England.

Cutts had a diverse body of work, comprising oil and watercolour paintings and pen and ink sketches; she is perhaps best known for her rural landscape paintings. She also worked as a restorer of old or damaged paintings.

Cutts' work is included in the collections of the National Gallery of Canada, the Art Gallery of Ontario, the Art Gallery of Hamilton, and the Robert McLaughlin Gallery. The Gertrude Spurr Cutts fonds is at the National Gallery of Canada Library and Archives.

She died in Port Perry, Ontario in 1941.

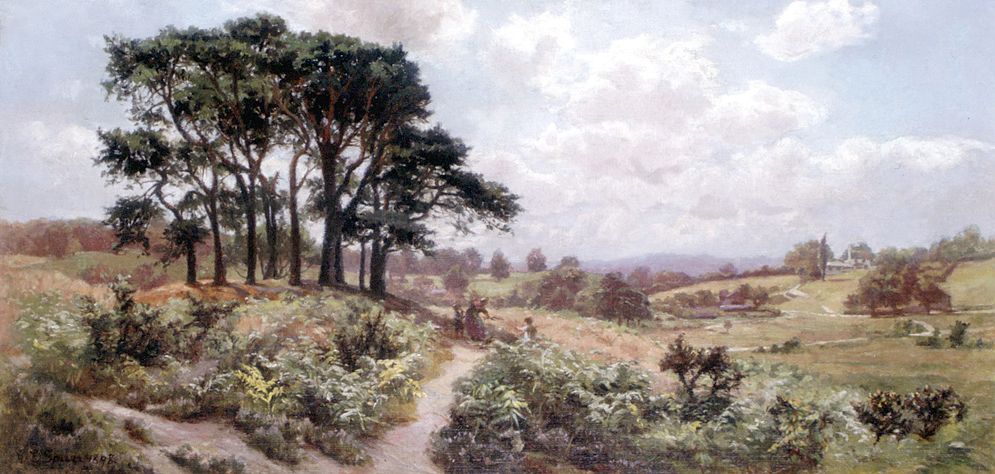
A Surrey Heathby Gertrude Eleanor Spurr Cutts
