= Royal Canadian Academy of Arts =

Canadian arts-related organization

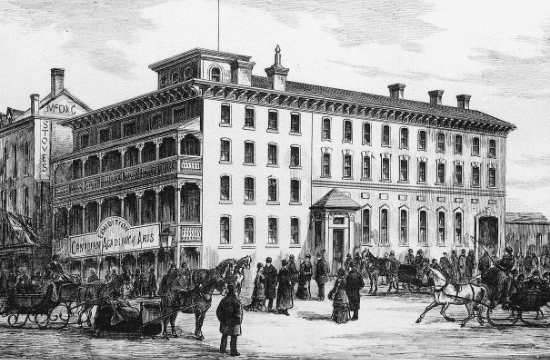
- Canadian Academy of Arts, 1880
- Abbreviation: RCA
- Formation: 1880; 146 years ago
- Type: Arts organization
- Legal status: Active
- Headquarters: Toronto, Ontario, Canada
- Region served: Canada
- Members: Over 790
- Official language: English, French

The Royal Canadian Academy of Arts (RCA) is a Canadian arts-related organization that was founded in 1880.

== History ==
=== 1880 to 1890 ===
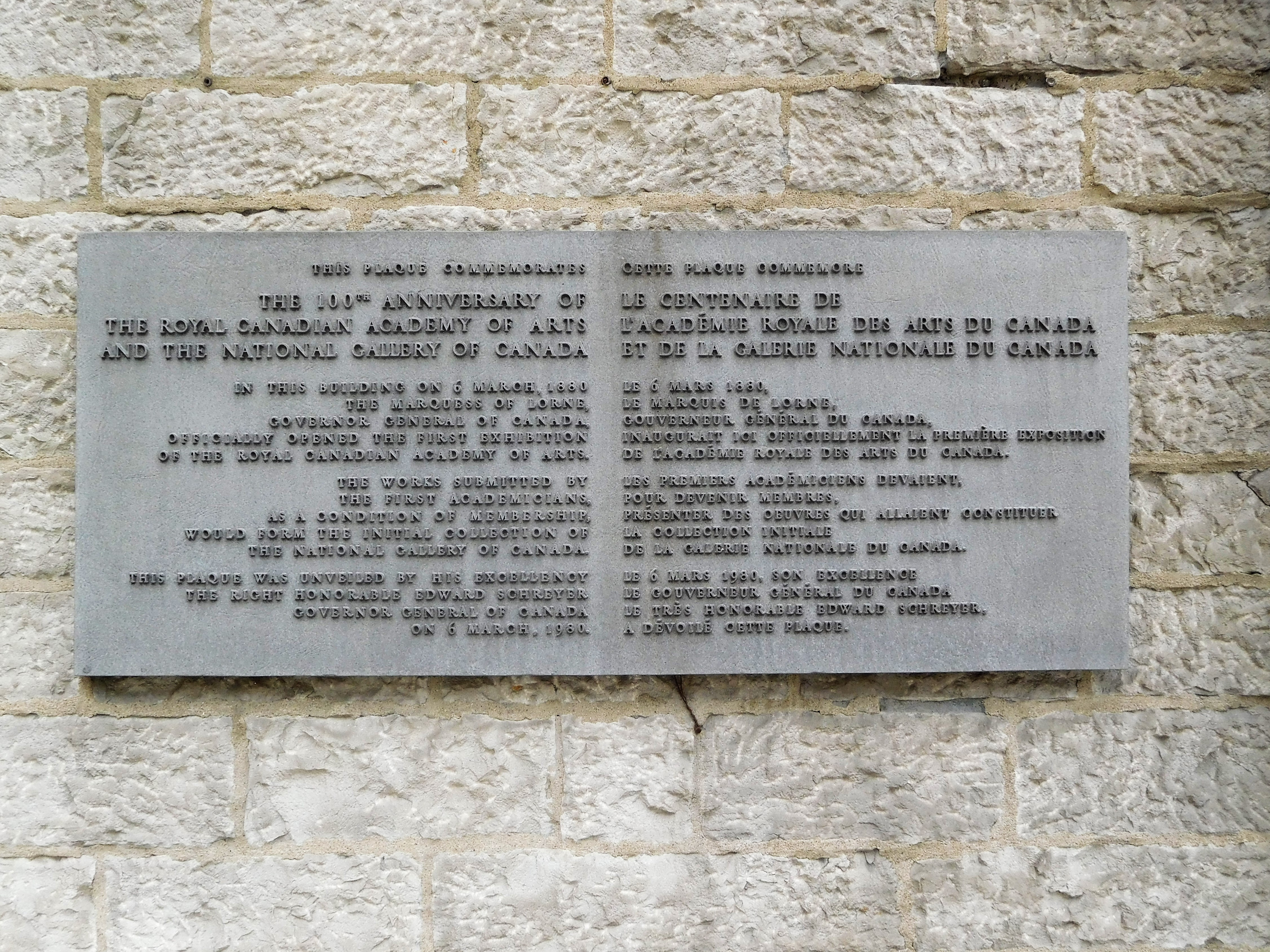
The 100th Anniversary

The title of Royal Canadian Academy of Arts was received from Queen Victoria on 16 July 1880. The Governor General of Canada, John Campbell, Marquess of Lorne, was its first patron. The painter Lucius O'Brien was its first president.

The objects of the Academy as stated in the 1881 publication of the organization's constitution were three-fold:

- First - the institution of a National Gallery at the seat of Government;
- Second - the holding of Exhibitions in the principal cities of the Dominion;
- Third - the establishment of Schools of Art and Design.

In the same publication, two levels of membership were described: Academicians and Associates. No more than forty individuals could be Academicians at one time, while the number of Associates was not limited. All Academicians were required to give an example of their work to the collection of the National Gallery. They were also permitted to show more pieces in Academy-sponsored exhibitions than Associates.

The inaugural exhibition was held in Ottawa and the first Academicians were inducted, including the first woman Academician, Charlotte Schreiber. Through the next 10 years, the Academy held annual exhibitions, often in cooperation with regional artists' societies. Exhibitions in Toronto were a joint project of the Academy and the Ontario Society of Artists, while those held in Montreal were held in partnership with the Art Association of Montreal. Exhibitions were also held in St. John, New Brunswick, and Halifax, Nova Scotia. Additional academicians and associates were added each year until the membership had more than doubled by 1890. Members were drawn from all areas of the country and included anglophones and francophones. Men continued to out-number women and those female members were identified as painters not as designers or architects.

As Academicians joined, they donated an example of their work to the National Gallery of Canada, building the collection of the as-yet unincorporated institution. A temporary home was found for the collection in a building next to the Supreme Court of Canada and the first curator, John W.H. Watts, RCA was appointed to begin organizing exhibitions.

The third objective—to encourage the teaching of art and design in Canada—was found to be more challenging to address with the limited financial resources available to them.

=== 1891 to present ===
Canadian landscape painter Homer Watson was elected as an associate, became a full member and later became president of the Academy.

In 1906, artist George Agnew Reid was elected president of the Academy. He held this position until 1909.

The centennial year of the Academy was honoured by a 35 cent, 3 colour postage stamp. The stamp features an image of the original centre block of the Parliament Buildings and the text "Royal Canadian Academy of Arts, 1880–1980", with the name "Thomas Fuller", a member of the Academy and the Dominion Architect of Canada who had designed the original building.

== Members ==
The Academy is composed of members from across Canada representing over twenty visual arts disciplines. This list is not inclusive. See also Category:Members of the Royal Canadian Academy of Arts.

=== 1880 to 1890 ===
Name	Gender	Discipline	1880	1881	1882	1883	1884	1886	1887	1888	1890
Aaron Allan Edson	male	painter	RCA	RCA	RCA	RCA	RCA	RCA	RCA		
William Nichol Cresswell	male	painter	RCA	RCA	RCA	RCA	RCA	RCA			
Daniel Fowler (1810–1894)	male	painter	RCA	RCA	RCA	RCA	RCA	RCA	RCA	RCA	RCA
John Arthur Fraser (1838–1898)	male	painter	RCA	RCA	RCA	RCA	RCA	RCA	RCA		
James Griffiths (1825–1896)	male	painter	RCA	RCA	RCA	RCA	RCA	RCA	RCA	RCA	RCA
Joseph Arthur Eugene Hamel (1845–1932)	male	painter	RCA	RCA	RCA	RCA	RCA	RCA			
Robert Harris	male	painter	RCA	RCA	RCA	RCA	RCA	RCA	RCA	RCA	RCA
John William Hopkins (1825–1905)	male	architect	RCA	RCA	RCA	RCA	RCA	RCA	RCA	RCA	RCA
Henry Langley	male	architect	RCA	RCA	RCA	RCA	RCA	RCA	RCA	RCA	RCA
Lucius Richard O'Brien	male	painter	RCA	RCA	RCA	RCA	RCA	RCA	RCA	RCA	RCA
William Raphael	male	painter	RCA	RCA	RCA	RCA	RCA	RCA	RCA	RCA	RCA
Henry Sandham	male	painter	RCA	RCA	RCA	RCA	RCA (non-resident)	RCA (non-resident)	RCA (non-resident)	RCA (non-resident)	RCA (non-resident)
Charlotte Schreiber	female	painter	RCA	RCA	RCA	RCA	RCA	RCA	RCA		
François Van Luppen (1838–1899)	male	sculptor	RCA	RCA	RCA	RCA	RCA	RCA			
James Smith (1832–1918)	male	architect	RCA	RCA	RCA	RCA	RCA	RCA	RCA	RCA	RCA
Thomas Seaton Scott	male	architect	RCA	RCA	RCA	RCA	RCA	RCA	RCA	RCA	
William George Storm	male	architect	RCA	RCA	RCA	RCA	RCA	RCA	RCA	RCA	RCA
Thomas Mower Martin	male	painter	RCA	RCA	RCA	RCA	RCA	RCA	RCA	RCA	RCA
Forshaw Day	male	painter	RCA	RCA	RCA	RCA	RCA	RCA	RCA	RCA	RCA
John Colin Forbes (1846–1925)	male	painter	RCA	RCA	RCA	RCA	RCA	RCA	RCA	RCA	RCA
male	painter	RCA	RCA	RCA	RCA	RCA	RCA	RCA	RCA	RCA	
John William Hurrell Watts (1850–1917)	male	designer		RCA	RCA	RCA	RCA	RCA	RCA	RCA	RCA
Homer Watson	male	painter			RCA	RCA	RCA	RCA	RCA	RCA	RCA
Thomas W. Fuller	male	architect			RCA	RCA	RCA	RCA	RCA	RCA	RCA
Alexander Cowper Hutchison (1838–1922)	male	architect			RCA	RCA	RCA	RCA	RCA	RCA	RCA
Marmaduke Matthews	male	painter				RCA	RCA	RCA	RCA	RCA	RCA
John George Howard	male	architect				RCA retired	RCA retired	RCA retired	RCA retired	RCA retired	
Antoine Plamondon	male	painter				RCA retired	RCA retired	RCA retired	RCA retired	RCA retired	RCA retired
Napoléon Bourassa	male	painter				RCA	RCA	RCA	RCA	RCA	RCA
William Armstrong	male	painter				ARCA	ARCA	ARCA	ARCA		
Robert Richard Baigent (1830–1890)	male	painter				ARCA	ARCA	ARCA			
Harrington Bird (1846–1936)	male	painter				ARCA	ARCA	ARCA	ARCA	ARCA	
Frederick Alexander Turner Dunbar (1849–1921)	male	sculptor				ARCA	ARCA	ARCA	ARCA		
Robert Ford Gagen (1847–1926)	male	painter				ARCA	ARCA	ARCA	ARCA	ARCA	ARCA
Michael Hannaford (1832–1891)	male	painter				ARCA	ARCA	ARCA	ARCA	ARCA	
George Harvey (1846–1910)	male	painter				ARCA	ARCA	ARCA	ARCA	ARCA	ARCA
Louis-Philippe Hébert	male	sculptor				ARCA	ARCA	ARCA	RCA	RCA	RCA
Frances Bannerman	female	painter				ARCA	ARCA	ARCA	ARCA	ARCA	
Henry Martin (1832–1902)	male	painter				ARCA	ARCA	ARCA	ARCA	ARCA	ARCA
John Christopher Miles (1837–1911)	male	painter				ARCA	ARCA	ARCA	ARCA	ARCA	ARCA
Andrew Dickson Patterson (1854–1930)	male	painter				ARCA	ARCA	ARCA	ARCA	RCA	RCA
Paul Peel	male	painter				ARCA	ARCA	ARCA	ARCA	ARCA	ARCA
William Revell (1830–1902)	male	painter				ARCA	ARCA	ARCA	ARCA	ARCA	ARCA
Joseph Thomas Rolph (1831–1916)	male	painter				ARCA	ARCA	ARCA	ARCA	ARCA	ARCA
William Ruel	male	painter				ARCA	ARCA	ARCA	ARCA	ARCA	ARCA
Frances Elwood Richards (1852–1934)	female	painter				ARCA	ARCA	ARCA			
Edward Scrope Shrapnel (1845-1920)	male	painter				ARCA	ARCA	ARCA	ARCA	ARCA	
Frederic Marlett Bell-Smith	male	painter				ARCA	ARCA	ARCA	RCA	RCA	RCA
Edward Buckingham Shuttleworth (1842–1934)	male	painter				ARCA	ARCA	ARCA	ARCA	ARCA	ARCA
James L. Weston (1815–1896)	male	painter				ARCA	ARCA	ARCA			
Robert R. Whale	male	painter				ARCA	ARCA	ARCA	ARCA		
William Doughtie (1846–1883)	male	designer				ARCA					
Eugène-Étienne Taché	male	designer				ARCA	ARCA	ARCA	ARCA		
Alfred H. Howard (1854–1916)	male	designer				ARCA	ARCA	RCA	RCA	RCA	RCA
Robert McCausland (1856–1923)	male	designer				ARCA	ARCA	ARCA	ARCA	ARCA	ARCA
James Balfour	male	architect				ARCA	ARCA	ARCA	ARCA	ARCA	ARCA
Charles Baillairgé	male	architect				ARCA	ARCA				
Edmund Burke	male	architect				ARCA	ARCA	ARCA	ARCA	ARCA	ARCA
Walter Chesterton (1845–1931)	male	architect				ARCA	ARCA	ARCA	ARCA	ARCA	
Joseph Connolly	male	architect				ARCA	ARCA	ARCA	RCA	RCA	RCA
Frank Darling	male	architect				ARCA	ARCA	ARCA	RCA	RCA	RCA
David Brash Dick (1846–1925)	male	architect				ARCA	ARCA	ARCA	ARCA	ARCA	ARCAre
Andrew Dewar (architect) (1846 – c. 1932)	male	architect				ARCA	ARCA	ARCA	ARCA	ARCA	
G. Ernest Fairweather	male	architect				ARCA	ARCA				
Robert Gage	male	architect				ARCA	ARCA	ARCA	ARCA	ARCA	ARCA
(1851–1915)	male	architect				ARCA	ARCA	ARCA	ARCA	ARCA	ARCA
Henry Bauld Gordon	male	architect				ARCA	ARCA	ARCA	ARCA	ARCA	ARCA
William Critchlow Harris	male	architect				ARCA	ARCA	ARCA	ARCA	ARCA	ARCA
William Irving (1830–1883)	male	architect				ARCA	ARCA				
John Thomas Charles McKean (1840–1911)	male	architect				ARCA	ARCA	ARCA	ARCA	ARCA	
Charles Willer Mulligan (1846–1908)	male	architect				ARCA	ARCA	ARCA			
James Nelson (1831–1913)	male	architect				ARCA	ARCA	ARCA	ARCA	ARCA	
Almond E. Paull (1824–1902)	male	architect				ARCA	ARCA	ARCA			
Alexander Denton Steele (1841–1890)	male	architect				ARCA	ARCA	ARCA	ARCA	ARCA	ARCA
William Stewart (1832–1907)	male	architect				ARCA	ARCA				
David Stirling	male	architect				ARCA	ARCA	ARCA			
Walter Reginald Strickland (1841–1915)	male	architect				ARCA	ARCA	ARCA			
Richard Cunningham Windeyer (1831–1900)	male	architect				ARCA	ARCA	ARCA	ARCA	ARCA	
Otto Reinhold Jacobi	male	painter					RCA	RCA	RCA	RCA	RCA
William Brymner	male	painter					ARCA	ARCA	RCA	RCA	RCA
Arthur Cox (1840–1917)	male	painter					ARCA	ARCA	ARCA	ARCA	ARCA
James A. Sydney Crocker	male	painter					ARCA	ARCA			
Percy Franklin Woodcock (1855–1936)	male	painter					ARCA	ARCA	RCA	RCA	RCA
William Tutin Thomas	male	architect					ARCA				
Alfred Boisseau (1823–1901)	male	painter						ARCA	ARCA	ARCA	ARCA
William Cruikshank	male	painter						ARCA	ARCA		
John Wycliffe Lowes Forster	male	painter						ARCA	ARCA	ARCA	ARCA
James Kerr-Lawson (1865–1939)	male	painter						ARCA	ARCA	ARCA	ARCA
John Charles Pinhey (1860–1912)	male	painter						ARCA	ARCA	ARCA	ARCA
George Agnew Reid	male	painter						ARCA	ARCA	ARCA	ARCA
John Ellis	male	designer						ARCA	ARCA	ARCA	
John Thompson Willing	male	designer						ARCA	ARCA	ARCA	
Henry Frederick Busch (1826–1902)	male	architect						ARCA	ARCA	ARCA	
Samuel George Curry	male	architect						ARCA	ARCA	ARCA	ARCA
Alexander Francis Dunlop	male	architect						ARCA	ARCA	ARCA	ARCA
George F. Durand (1850–1889)	male	architect						ARCA	ARCA	ARCA	
Robert McNicol (fl. 1881–83)	male	architect						ARCA	ARCA	ARCA	
Andrew Taylor	male	architect						ARCA	ARCA	ARCA	ARCA
Hamilton MacCarthy	male	sculptor							ARCA	ARCA	RCA
Frederick Charles S. Gordon (1856–1924)	male	painter								ARCA	ARCA
Emma S. Windeat (fl. 1884–1926)	female	painter								ARCA	ARCA

Name	discipline	1896
William Edwin Atkinson (Canadian painter, 1862–1926)	painter	ARCA
George Théodore Berthon	painter	RCA
Franklin Brownell (1857–1946)	painter	RCA
George Robert Bruenech (1851–1916)	painter	ARCA
Frederick Sproston Challener, (1869–1959)	painter	ARCA
Gertrude Spurr Cutts (1858–1941)	painter	ARCA
Edmond Dyonnet	painter	ARCA
Mary Alexandra Eastlake née Bell (1864–1951)	painter	ARCA
Harriet Ford (1859–1939)	painter	ARCA
James Lillie Graham (1873–1971)	painter	ARCA
Edmund Wyly Grier	painter	RCA
John A. Hammond	painter	RCA
Sarah Holden	painter	ARCA
William R. Hope (1863–1931)	painter	ARCA
Farquhar McGillivray Knowles (1859–1932)	painter	ARCA
Laura Muntz Lyall	painter	ARCA
Hamilton MacCarthy	sculptor	RCA
Charles Macdonald Manly (1855–1924)	painter	ARCA
Joseph W. Power	architect	ARCA
Mary Augusta Hiester Reid (1854–1921)	painter	ARCA
William Albert Sherwood (1855–1919)	painter	ARCA
W. L. Symons	architect	ARCA
S. H. Townsend	architect	ARCA
Sydney Strickland Tully (1869–1911)	painter	ARCA
Frederick Arthur Verner	painter	ARCA
Carl Henry Ahrens (1863–1936)	painter	ARCA
Paul Giovanni Wickson (1860–1922)	painter	ARCA
Curtis Williamson (1867–1944)	painter	ARCA
Emma S. Windeat (fl. 1884–1926)	painter	ARCA

=== Academy membership in 1907 ===
Academicians

- Frederic Marlett Bell-Smith, painter
- Franklin Brownell, painter
- William Brymner, painter
- Frederick Sproston Challener, painter
- Alexander Francis Dunlop, architect
- Edmond Dyonnet, painter
- Edmund Wyly Grier, painter
- Gustav Hahn, designer
- John A. Hammond, painter
- Robert Harris, painter
- Louis-Philippe Hébert, sculptor
- William R. Hope, painter
- Alfred H. Howard, designer
- A.C. Hutchison, architect
- Farquhar McGillivray Knowles, painter
- Hamilton MacCarthy, sculptor
- Thomas Mower Martin, painter
- Marmaduke Matthews, painter
- Andrew Dickson Patterson, painter
- John Charles Pinhey, painter
- George Agnew Reid, painter
- James Smith, architect
- Homer Watson, painter
- John W.H. Watts, designer

Associates

- William Edwin Atkinson (1862–1926)
- John William Beatty
- Harry Britton
- George Robert Bruenech (1851–1916)
- Florence Carlyle
- Arthur Cox (1840–1917)
- William Cruikshank
- Maurice Galbraith Cullen
- Gertrude Spurr Cutts
- John Wycliffe Lowes Forster
- Joseph-Charles Franchère (1866–1921)
- Robert Ford Gagen
- James Lillie Graham
- Clara Sophia Hagarty (1871–1958)
- Charles Macdonald Manly
- John Christopher Miles
- Edmund Montague Morris (1871–1913)
- Laura Muntz Lyall
- Sophie Pemberton
- Mary Hiester Reid
- Joseph Thomas Rolph
- Joseph St Charles (1868–1956)
- William Albert Sherwood
- William St. Thomas Smith (1862–1947)
- Sydney Strickland Tully
- Frederick Arthur Verner
- Curtis Williamson
- Emma S. Windeat

=== Inducted in 1971 ===
- Alfred Pellan CC OQ, artist

=== Inducted in 1973 ===
- Armand Tatossian, painter

=== Inducted in 1974 ===
- John Max, photographer

=== Inducted in 1976 ===
- Richard Gorman, painter
- Ruth Gowdy McKinley, first potter elected to Academy
- Peter H. Kolisnyk, sculptor

=== Inducted in 1990 ===
- Suezan Aikins, printmaker

=== Inducted in 1991 ===
- Arto Tchakmaktchian, sculptor

=== Inducted in 1999 ===
- Chris Cran
- Erica Rutherford, visual artist, writer and playwright
- Hilda Woolnough, artist and printmaker

=== Inducted in 2002 ===
- Catherine Crowston, arts administrator
- Ann Davis, arts administrator
- Trudy Golley, ceramics
- Robert Mellin, architect
- Pitaloosie Saila, printmaker
- George A. Walker, book designer
- Alexander J. Wyse, painting

=== Inducted in 2004 ===
- Scott Plear, painting

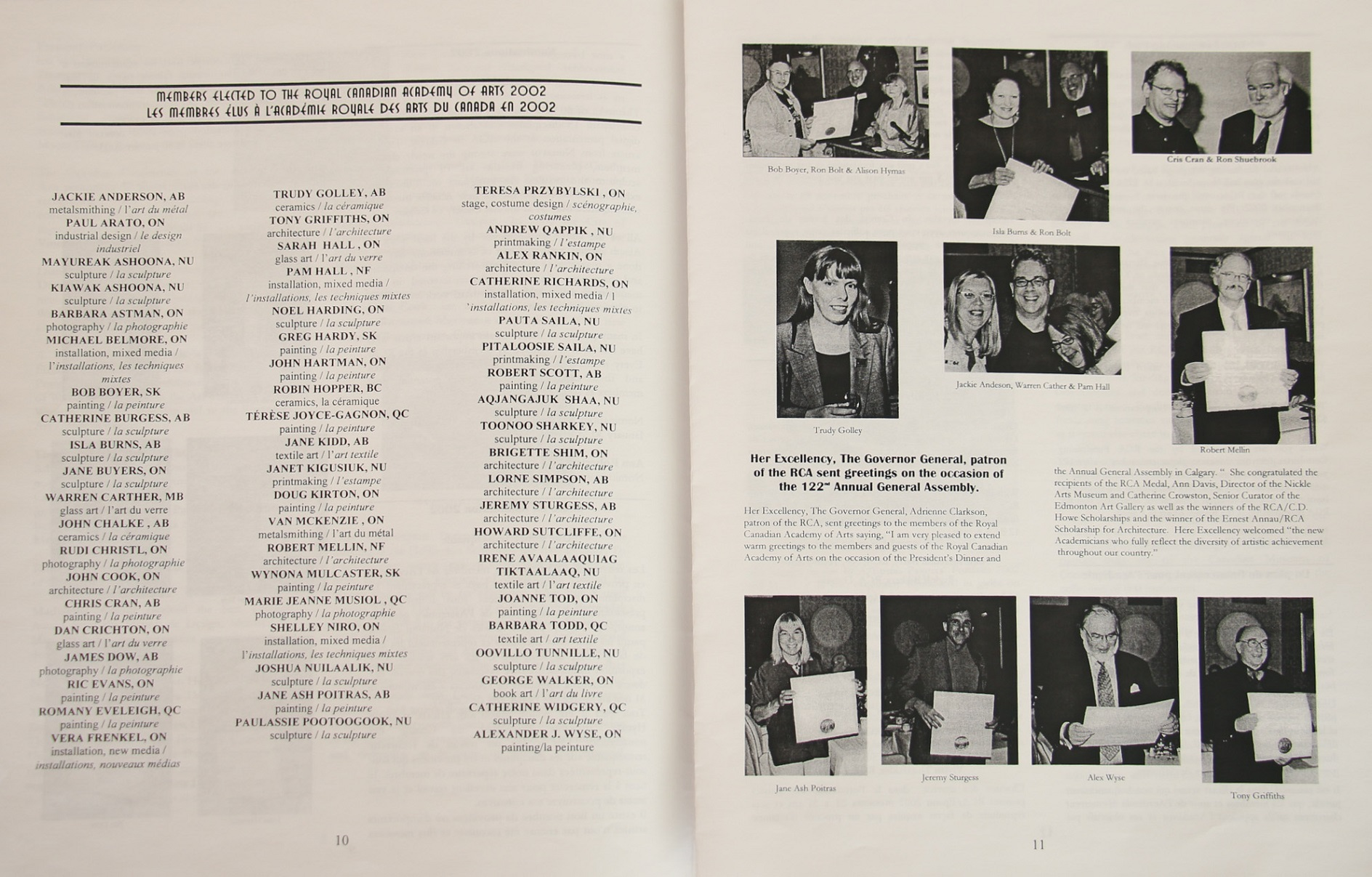
2002 RCA Inductees List

- Gregory Henriquez, architect
- Orland Larson, goldsmith

=== Inducted in 2005 ===
- Aiko Suzuki, textile and visual artist.

=== Inducted in 2006 ===
- Paul Wm. Leathers, metalsmithing

=== Inducted in 2007 ===
- Aggie Beynon, metalsmithing
- Alexandre Castonguay, digital art
- Douglas Coupland, sculptural installation
- Karen Dahl, ceramics
- James Doran, enamel sculpture
- Noam Gonick, film making
- Robert W. Harrison, ceramics
- Enid Legros-Wise, ceramics
- Laura L. Letinsky, photography
- Simon Neil Minuk, architecture
- Paula Murray, ceramics
- Grace Nickel, ceramics
- Richard James Rivet, painting, printmaking
- Michael Smith, painting
- Arlene Stamp, two dimensional art and design
- Reva Stone, digital art
- Ewa Tarsia, painting, printmaking
- Ione Thorkelsson, glass
- Kamila Wozniakowska, painting

=== Inducted in 2008 ===
- Catherine Farish, printmaking
- Susan Collett, ceramics

=== Inducted in 2009 ===
- AA Bronson
- Sara Diamond
- Marius Dubois
- Christian Eckart
- Faye Heavyshield
- Garry Neill Kennedy
- Rita McKeough
- Mary Scott
- John Will
- Justin Wonnacott

=== Inducted in 2010 ===
- Chantal Gilbert (artist), metal
- Robert Jekyll, stained glass
- Lou Lynn, glass and metal
- Janice Wright-Cheney, textiles

=== Inducted in 2011 ===
- Philip Beesley, architecture
- Sonia Chow, graphic design
- Richard Thomas Davis, painting, drawing, printmaking
- Leya Evelyn, painting
- FASTWÜRMS, mixed media
- Wyn Geleynse, video art
- Peter Krausz, painting, drawing
- Charles Lewton-Brain, metalsmithing
- Alex Livingston (artist), painting, digital art
- Mike Massie, jewellery
- Laura Millard, painting, photography
- John Noestheden, works on paper, drawing
- Stu Oxley, painting, printmaking
- Anne Ramsden, installation, mixed media, photography
- Dan Steeves, printmaking
- Denis Villeneuve, filmmaking

=== Inducted in 2012 ===
- Andre Bergeron
- Sandra Bromley
- Tara Bryan
- Ginette Caron
- Sean Caulfield
- Naomi London
- Sarah Maloney
- Jean Pierre Morin
- Nadia Myre
- Anna Torma
- Eva Lapka, ceramics

=== Inducted in 2013 ===
- Clarence Dick
- Christos Dikeakos,
- Charles Elliott
- Lynda Gammon
- Rusdi Genest
- Chief Tony Hunt
- David MacWilliam
- Les Manning
- Barbara Paterson
- Susan G. Scott
- Andrew Wright

=== Inducted in 2014 ===
- Diane Bisson
- Marc Boutin
- Luben Boykov
- Karen Cantine
- Donna Clare
- Cora Cluett
- Gene Dub, architect
- Frédéric Metz
- Louie Palu, photographer
- Claude Provencher
- Russell Yuristy

=== Inducted in 2015 ===
- Claude Cormier, landscape architecture
- Jacques Fournier, bookbinding
- Libby Hague, printmaking
- Tanya Harnett, interdisciplinary
- Wesley Harris, metalsmithing
- Peter Jacobs, landscape architecture
- Lew Yung-Chien, photography
- Amy Loewan, installation, mixed media
- Rafael Lozano-Hemmer, interdisciplinary
- Marie-Christiane Mathieu, interdisciplinary
- Alexandra McCurdy, ceramics
- Nancy Petry, mixed media
- Alan Stein, book design
- John Taylor, photography

=== Inducted in 2016 ===
- Shuvinai Ashoona, drawing
- David Blatherwick, painting
- Ricardo L. Castro, photography, architecture
- Alan R. Collyer, architecture
- Rosalie Favell, photography
- Les Graff, painting
- Andrew Gruft, architecture
- James Hart, sculpture
- Helen Kerr, industrial design
- Alain LeBrun, illustration, graphic design
- Marian Penner Bancroft, photography, video art
- Frank Shebageget, sculpture, installation
- Allyson Simmie, jewellery design
- Brendan Lee Satish Tang, sculpture
- Peter von Tiesenhausen, sculpture, installation
- Ian Wallace, photography, painting
- Elizabeth Zvonar, collage, sculpture

=== Inducted in 2017 ===
- Yael Brotman, printmaking
- Diana Dean, painting, sculpture
- Keith L. Graham, architecture
- Barrie Jones, photography
- Royden Mills, sculpture
- Craig Richards, photography
- Jean-Daniel Rohrer, painting
- Marie Saint Pierre, fashion design

=== Inductees for 2018 ===
- David T. Alexander, painting
- Noel Best, architecture
- Anne Carrier, architecture
- Pierre Coupey, painting
- Shayne Dark, sculpture
- Lucy Hogg, painting
- Katherine Knight, photography
- Gary Pearson, painting and drawing
- Udo Schliemann, design
- Barrie Jones, visual artist (photo, video, sculpture)

=== Others ===
- Rebecca Belmore (born 1960), performance and installation work
- Sheila Butler (born 1938), visual artist
- Luc Courchesne (born 1952) (inducted 2010 by way of the RCA Nomination process), interactive art
- George Harding Cuthbertson (1929–2017), yacht designer
- Douglas Patrick George (1943–2025), visual artist
- William Kurelek (1927–1977), artist
- Robert Pilot (1898–1967), artist, muralist
- Leslie Reid (born 1947), inducted 1977, painter and printmaker
- John A. Schweitzer (born 1952), collagist
- Philip Surrey (1910–1990), painter
- George Campbell Tinning (1910–1996), painter
- Gentile Tondino (1923–2001), painter

== See also ==
- List of Canadian organizations with royal patronage
