= List of OCAD University people =

OCAD University, an art and design post-secondary university in Toronto, holds an association with a number of individuals, including alumni, faculty, and staff.

== Alumni ==
- Stuart Ash – graphic designer
- Madeline Ashby – science fiction writer
- Myfanwy Ashmore – conceptual artist
- Barbara Astman – artist, photographer
- Yank Azman – actor
- Michael Belmore – sculptor
- Rebecca Belmore – artist
- David Blackwood – artist
- Barry Blitt – cartoonist, illustrator
- Shary Boyle – sculpture, painting, drawing, performance
- Benjamin Brown – architect
- Jubal Brown – video artist
- Nina Bunjevac – cartoonist
- George Bures Miller – installation artist
- Jack Bush – abstract expressionist painter, member of the Painters Eleven
- Meryn Cadell – writer, performance artist
- Franklin Carmichael – painter, member of the Group of Seven
- Robert-Ralph Carmichael – artist
- Robin Cass – filmmaker, producer
- Aimee Chan – graphic designer, Miss Hong Kong 2006, actress
- Candy Chang – former actress, multiple pageant winner
- Agnes Chow – former social activist
- Olivia Chow – politician, 66th Mayor of Toronto
- Hannah Claus – artist
- Holly Coulis – artist, painter
- Greta Dale – muralist
- Cathy Daley – artist, educator
- Ken Danby – artist, painter
- Will Davies – illustrator, teacher
- Jan Derbyshire – comedian, playwright
- Bonnie Devine – artist
- Jim Donohue – graphic designer
- George Dunning – artist, illustrator
- Wallace Edwards – illustrator
- Frank Faubert – politician, final Mayor of Scarborough
- Harriet Mary Ford – painter, jeweller
- Glenn Fretz – graphic designer
- Ed Furness – comic book artist, painter
- Gregory Gallant – comic book artist, writer
- Melissa General – artist
- Max Gimblett – artist
- Katherine Gray – artist
- Emanuel Hahn – sculptor, coin designer
- Alexa Kumiko Hatanaka – printmaker
- Rachel Hayward – actress
- Wade Hemsworth – songwriter
- Dorothy Henriques-Wells – painter
- J. C. Heywood – master printmaker and painter
- April Hickox – photographer, artist, academic
- Peter Ho – singer, producer, actor, model
- Cleeve Horne – painter, sculptor
- James Archibald Houston – artist, children's author
- Barbara Howard – artist, wood engraver
- Eli Ilan – sculptor
- Michael Ironside – actor, director
- Clark Johnson – actor, director
- Tracey Johnston-Aldworth – entrepreneur, environmentalist
- Carlos del Junco – musician
- Garry Kennedy – conceptual artist
- Arounna Khounnoraj – artist, teacher, and author
- Brian Kipping – artist, musician
- Maya Kulenovic – painter
- William Kurelek – artist, writer
- Monte Kwinter – politician
- Martha Ladly – designer, musician
- Evelyn Lambart – animator, director
- Artis Lane – sculptor, painter
- Robert Lougheed – artist
- Irene Loughlin – performance artist, writer
- Wayne Lum – sculptor, commercial artist
- Charmaine Lurch – artist, educator
- Mary Florence MacDonald – curator
- Duncan Macpherson – cartoonist
- Michael Martchenko – illustrator
- Bruce Mau – designer, writer
- Sanaz Mazinani – artist
- Doris McCarthy – landscape artist
- Florence Helena McGillivray – painter
- Manly E. MacDonald – artist
- Christine McGlade – digital designer, television producer
- Ross McLaren – artist, filmmaker
- Esmaa Mohamoud – installation artist, sculptor
- Claire Mowat – writer
- Grant Munro – animator, filmmaker
- Will Munro – artist
- Walter Tandy Murch – painter
- Shelley Niro – painter, installation artist, filmmaker
- Mary Margaret O'Hara – musician, actress
- Lucille Oille – sculptor, illustrator
- Kim Ondaatje – painter, photographer, filmmaker
- Edie Parker – sculptor
- Harley Parker – painter
- Lee Patterson – actor
- Rajni Perera – sculptor, illustrator
- Kelly Richardson – video artist, photographer
- Rirkrit Tiravanija – artist
- Mazo de la Roche – writer
- David Rokeby – installation artist
- William Ronald – painter, founder of the Painters Eleven
- Karl Schroeder – science fiction writer
- Floria Sigismondi – photographer, director
- Anne Simpson – poet, novelist
- Michael Snow – musician, installation artist, filmmaker
- Rudolf Stussi – painter
- Angela Su – artist
- Rick Switzer – sculptor
- Paul Szep – cartoonist
- Gary Taxali – artist, illustrator
- Ty Templeton – comic book artist, musician, actor
- Rirkrit Tiravanija – installation artist
- Camille Turner – performance artist
- Mimi Vandermolen – automobile designer
- Maurice Vellekoop – artist, illustrator
- Lea Vivot – sculptor
- Jan Wade – artist
- George A. Walker – book artist
- Simon Wilcox – musician
- Richard Williams – animator
- Dick Wilson – actor
- Elizabeth Wyn Wood – sculptor
- Jaret Vadera – artist
- Noreen Young – producer, puppeteer
- Yovska – drag performer

== Faculty ==
Faculty and staff of OCAD University and its predecessors have included:

- Roy Ascott
- Barbara Astman
- Aba Bayefsky
- Bill Buxton
- Hans Kleefeld
- Nicole Collins
- William Cruikshank
- Carl Dair
- Cathy Daley
- Bonnie Devine
- Allan Fleming
- Richard Fung
- Claude Gidman
- Ian Carr-Harris
- Robert Harris
- Johanna Householder
- Burton Kramer
- Martha Ladly
- Suzy Lake
- Min Sook Lee
- Arthur Lismer
- J. E. H. MacDonald
- Jock Macdonald
- Thomas Mower Martin
- Ashok Mathur
- Christine McGlade
- Christiane Pflug
- George Agnew Reid
- Lisa Steele
- Jutta Treviranus
- Maurice Vellekoop
- George A. Walker
- Norman White
- Muriel Wood

== Chancellors ==
- Rosalie Sharp (2004–2007)
- James K. Bartleman (2007–2010)
- Catherine Delaney (2010–2017)
- Salah Bachir (2017–2021)
- Jaime Watt (2022–present)

== Administration ==
=== Principals ===
- George Agnew Reid (1912–1928)
- J. E. H. MacDonald (1928–1932)
- Fred S. Haines (1932–1951)
- Lawrence A. C. Panton (1951–1954)
- Sydney Hollinger Watson (1955–1970)

=== Presidents ===
- Roy Ascott (1971–1972)
- Clifford Pitt (1972–1975)
- Paul Duncan Fleck (1975–1982)
- Norman Blasdell Hathaway (1983–1987)
- Timothy Porteous (1988–1995)
- Alan Barkley (1995–1998)
- Catherine Henderson (1998–2000)
- Ron Shuebrook (2000–2005)
- Sara Diamond (2005–2020)
- Ana Serrano (2020–present)
