= Vancouver Art Gallery =

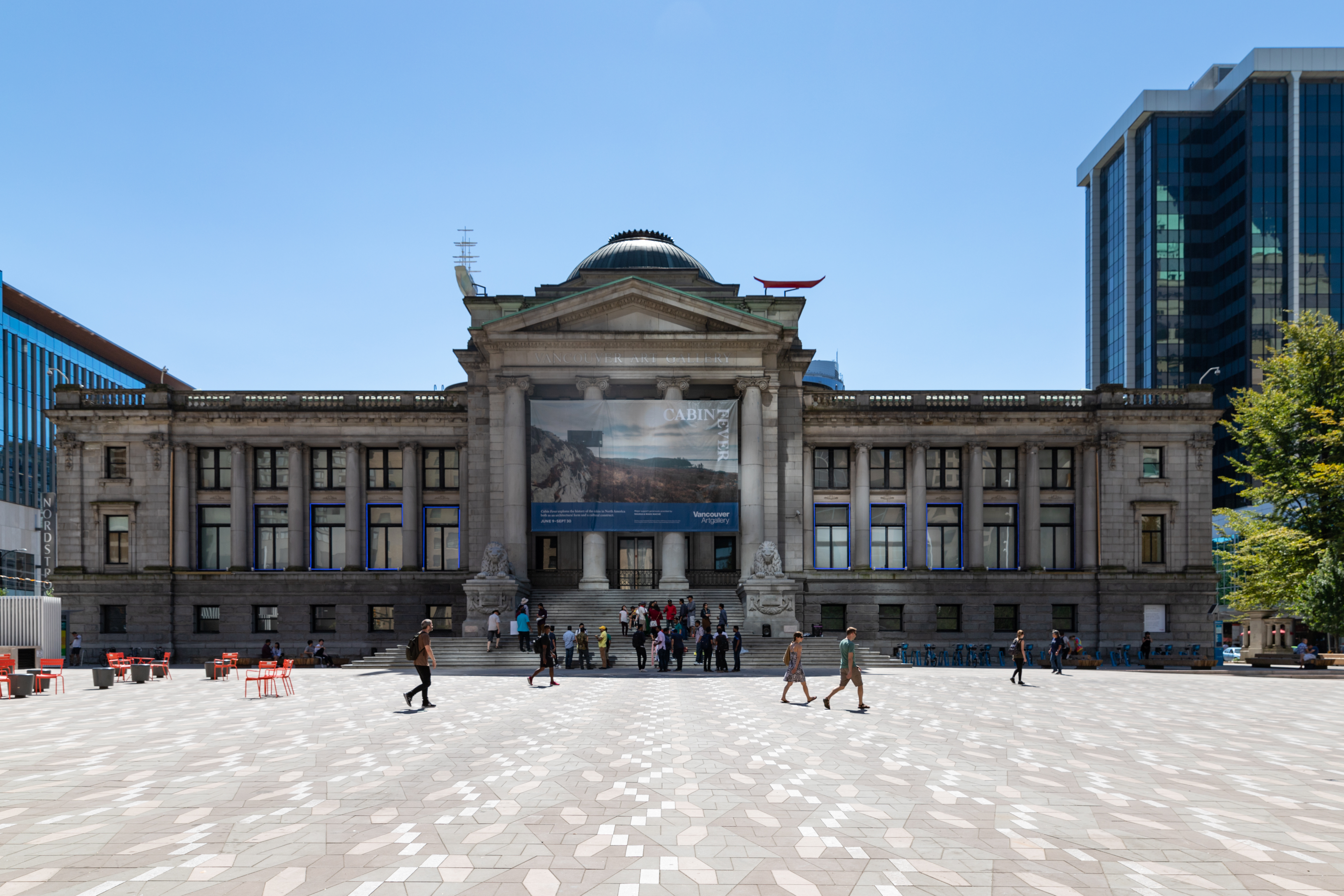
- Northeast facade of the Vancouver Art Gallery
- Established: April 1931; 95 years ago
- Location: 750 Hornby Street, Vancouver, British Columbia, Canada
- Coordinates: 49.282875°N 123.120464°W
- Type: Art museum
- Visitors: 305,421 (2020)
- Directors: Sirish Rao and Eva Respini
- Curators: Diana Freundl, Richard Hill, Stephanie Rebick
- Website: www.vanartgallery.bc.ca

The Vancouver Art Gallery (VAG) is an art museum in Vancouver, British Columbia, Canada. The museum occupies a 15,300-square-metre-building (165,000 sq ft) adjacent to Robson Square in downtown Vancouver, making it the largest art museum in Western Canada by building size. Designed by Francis Rattenbury, the building that the museum occupies was originally opened as a provincial courthouse, before it was re-purposed for museum use in the early 1980s. The building was designated the Former Vancouver Law Courts National Historic Site of Canada in 1980.

The museum first opened its doors to the public in 1931, housed within a structure crafted by the architectural firm Sharp and Johnston. In 1950, the museum underwent its initial expansion within this original building. Later, the institution embarked on a transition to the former provincial courthouse premises, with the relocation being completed in 1983. Subsequently, in the late 2000s and 2010s, the museum initiated plans for a further relocation to a new facility situated in Larwill Park.

The Gallery's permanent collection serves as a repository of art for the Lower Mainland region, and has approximately 12,000 works by artists from Canada, and around the world. As of 2020, the museum holds seasonal exhibitions as well as hosts travelling exhibitions.

== History ==
In April 1931, the Vancouver Art Gallery Association was established under the provincial Society Act, in order to establish and maintain a museum for the City of Vancouver. The Association opened the art museum to the public at 1145 West Georgia Street on 5 October 1931. The building was designed by architectural firm Sharp and Johnston, and featured four galleries, one of which included a sculpture hall, a lecture hall, and a library. The cost to construct the building was approximately CA$40,000.

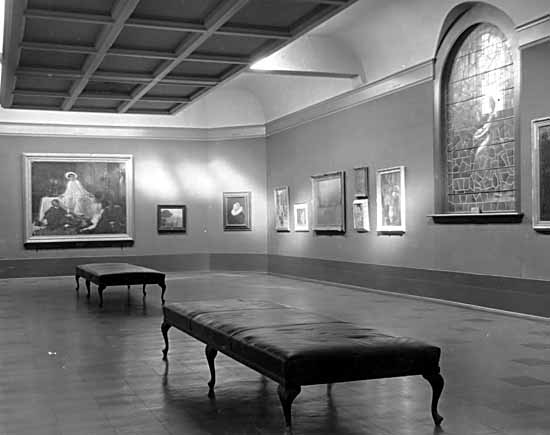
Interior of the museum's first building at West Georgia Street, 1932

Works by British, and other European artists dominated the works exhibited at the museum at the time of its opening. In 1938, the museum was one of the buildings occupied by unemployed protesters during a sitdown strike in the weeks leading up to Bloody Sunday. Paintings were not damaged while the protesters occupied the building.

In 1950, the museum conducted renovations to its building, reshaping the design of the building towards an International Style of architecture; with the removal of the building's Art Deco facade. Renovations were also conducted to accommodate the 157 works bequeathed to the museum by Emily Carr, with the building reopened to the public in 1951. Cost for the renovation was approximately CA$600,000, funded by the City of Vancouver government, and funds raised by Lawren Harris.

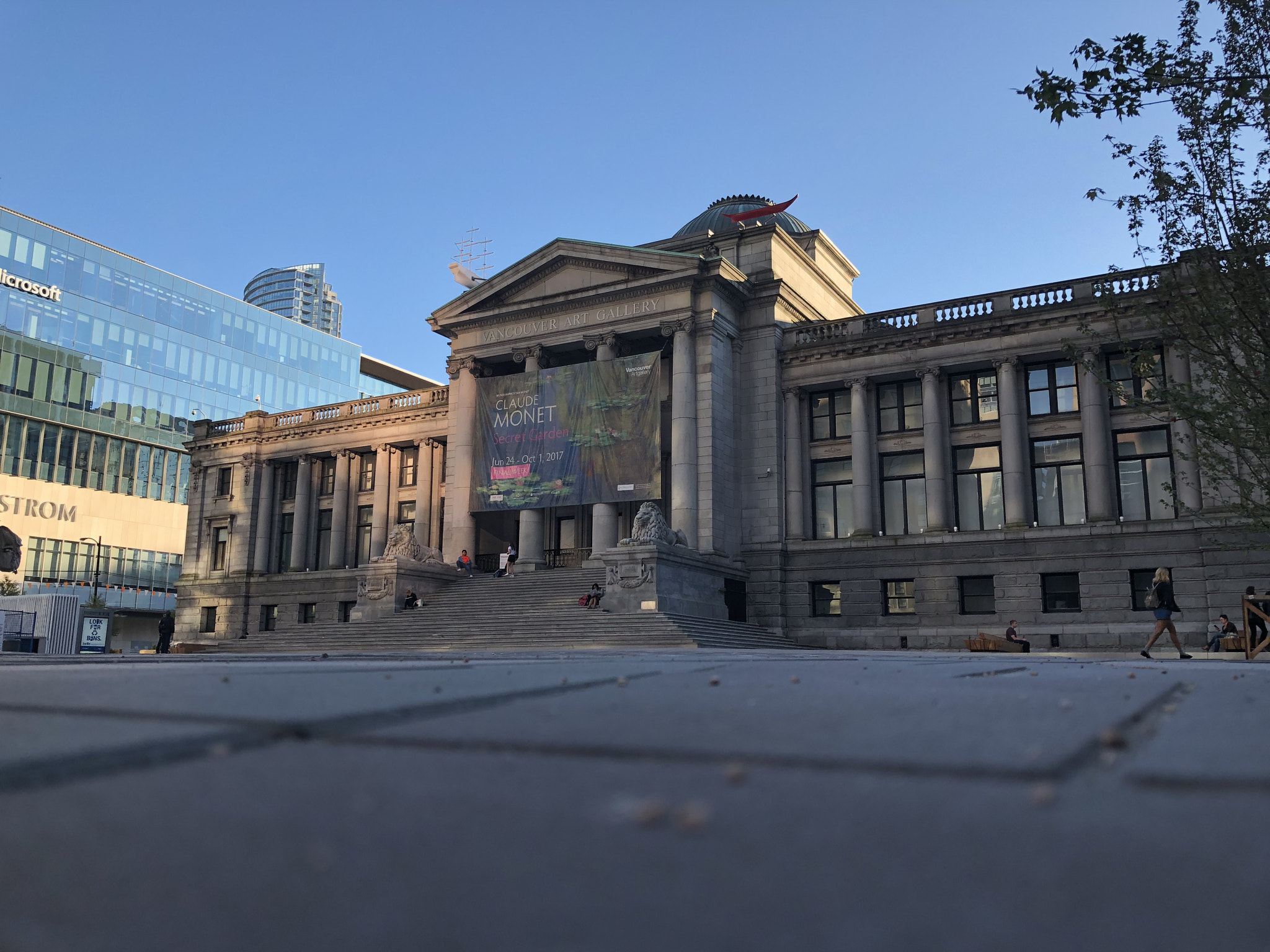
The museum was relocated to the former provincial courthouse in 1983

In 1983 the museum was relocated to its present location, the former provincial courthouse. The building continues to be owned by the Government of British Columbia, although the museum occupies the building through a 99-year sublease signed with the City of Vancouver government in 1974; who in turn leases the building from the provincial government. Before the re-purposed building was opened to the public, it was renovated by architect Arthur Erickson at a cost of CA$20 million, as a part of his larger three city-block Robson Square redevelopment. The gallery connects to the rest of Robson Square via an underground passage below Robson Street.

In 2015, the museum purchased 10 oil sketches by J. E. H. MacDonald. Shortly after the VAG unveiled the works, questions surrounding their provenance emerged, leading to a nearly nine-year investigation that ultimately revealed the sketches were forgeries.

=== Relocation planning ===
Planning to relocate the museum began as early as 2004, a result from the gallery's need for more exhibition and storage space for its collections. In November 2007, the museum announced plans to move to seek the approval of Vancouver City Council to build a new building at Larwill Park. In May 2008, the municipal government and the museum announced plans to relocate around the Plaza of Nations. However, Vancouver City Council later reversed its decision in April 2013, opting to approve the original proposed site in Larwill Park. The museum would occupy the building under similar arrangements as the former courthouse, with the museum leasing the property from the City of Vancouver.

The museum issued a request for qualifications for a new building design in September 2013. Herzog & de Meuron's bid was selected by the museum in April 2014. The development of the Vancouver Art Gallery's new building is the first project for the architectural firm in the country. Perkins and Will's Vancouver branch was contracted as the project's executive architects.

The building was originally planned to be completed in 2020, and was named the Chan Centre for the Visual Arts after a major donor. However, developments for the project stalled due to a funding dispute between the federal and provincial governments. As of March 2023, the new building's cost is estimated at $400 million. As of March 2023, the museum has raised over $340 million from public and private sources. Over $190 million was raised through private donations, including a $40 million contribution from the Chan Foundation in 2019 and a $100 million donation from the Audain Foundation in 2021. The latter was the largest cash donation to a Canadian public art museum.

Groundbreaking for the new museum building occurred on 15 September 2023, with construction taking place on the site in March 2024. However, it was later paused in August. On December 3, 2024, the gallery announced it had scrapped its proposed building design after projected costs rose from $400 million to $600 million. Herzog & de Meuron were removed from the project.

=== Select exhibitions since 2006 ===
The Vancouver Art Gallery has organized and hosted a number of temporary, and travelling exhibitions. A select list of exhibitions held at the museum since 2005 include:

- Brian Jungen (2006)
- Monet to Dali: Modern Masters from the Cleveland Museum of Art (2007)
- KRAZY! The Delirious World of Anime + Comics + Video Games + Art (2008)
- Vermeer, Rembrandt and the Golden Age of Dutch Art Masterpieces from The Rijksmuseum (2009)
- Leonardo da Vinci: The Mechanics of Man (2010)
- The Colour of My Dreams: The Surrealist Revolution in Art (2011)
- Collecting Matisse and Modern Masters: The Cone Sisters of Baltimore (2012)
- Beat Nation: Art, Hip Hop and Aboriginal Culture (2012)
- Grand Hotel: Redesigning Modern Life (2013)
- Charles Edenshaw (2013)
- The Forbidden City: Inside the Court of China’s Emperors (2014)
- Unscrolled: Reframing Tradition in Chinese Contemporary Art (2014)
- Cezanne and the Modern: Masterpieces of European Art from the Pearlman Collection (2015)
- How Do I Fit This Ghost in My Mouth? An exhibition by Geoffrey Farmer (2015)
- Embracing Canada: Landscapes from Krieghoff to the Group of Seven (2015)
- Douglas Coupland: Everywhere Is Anywhere Is Anything Is Everything (2015)
- MashUp: The Birth of Modern Culture (2016)
- Picasso: The Artist and His Muses (2016)
- Claude Monet’s Secret Garden (2017)
- Takashi Murakami: The Octopus Eats its Own Leg (2018)
- French Moderns: Monet to Matisse, 1850-1950 (2019)
- Alberto Giacometti: A Line Through Time (2019)
- Cindy Sherman (2020)
- Jan Wade: Soul Power (2021–22)
- Growing Freedom: The instructions of Yoko Ono / The art of John and Yoko (2022)
- Conceptions of White (2023)
- J. E. H. MacDonald? A Tangled Garden (2023–24)
- Denyse Thomasos: just beyond (2023-2024)
- Firelei Báez (2024-2025)

== Building ==
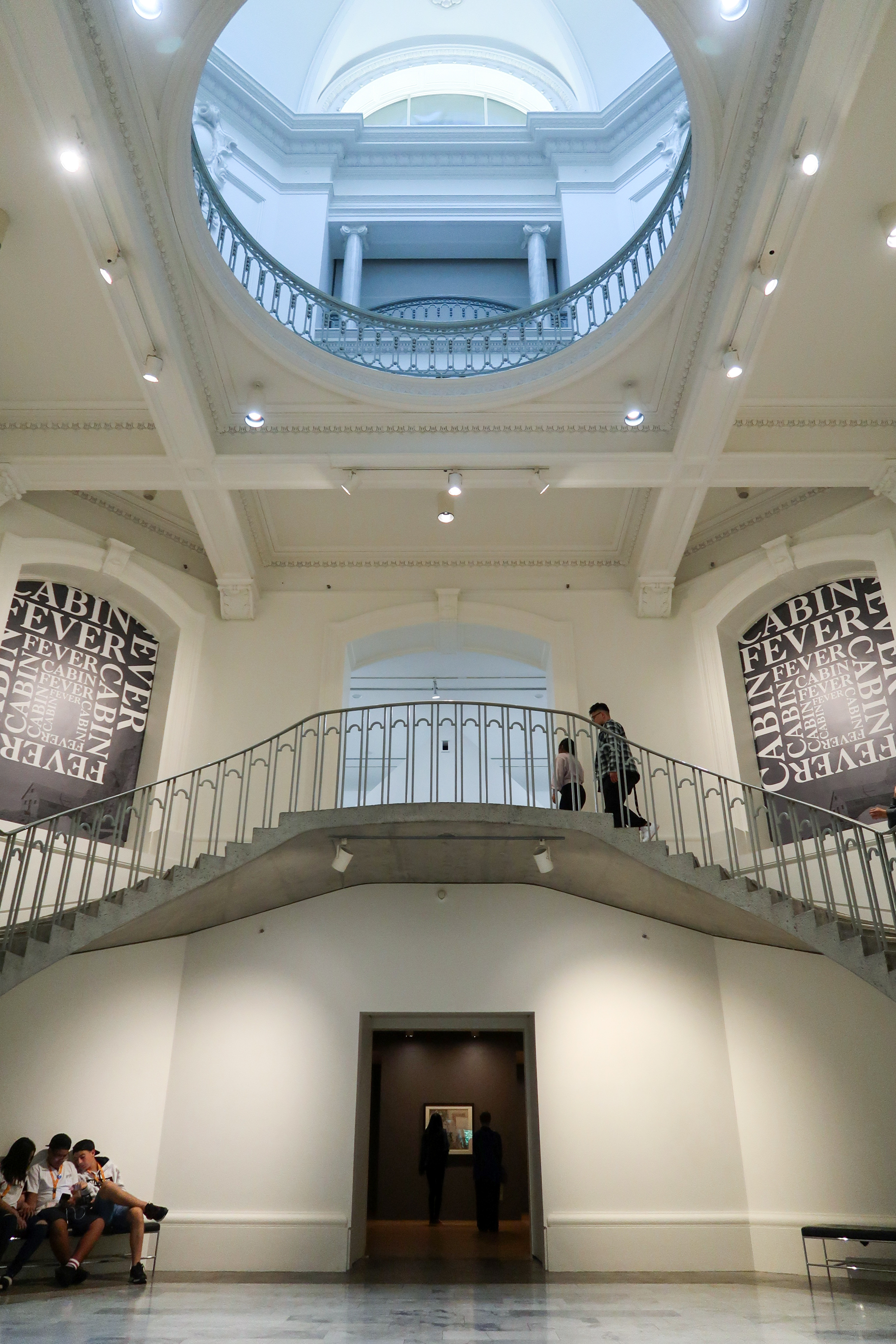
Void stairs inside the building. Completed in 1906, the building was later designated as a National Historic Site in 1980.

The art museum is in the former provincial courthouse for Vancouver. The 15,300-square-metre (165,000 sq ft) neoclassical building was designed by Francis Rattenbury after winning a design competition in 1905. The building was opened as a provincial courthouse in 1911, and operated as such until 1979, with the provincial courts moved to the Law Courts south of the building. The building was designated the Former Vancouver Law Courts National Historic Site of Canada in 1980. Both the main and annex portions of the building are also designated "A" heritage structures by the municipal government. The Vancouver Art Gallery moved into the former courthouse in 1983.

The Centennial Fountain on the Georgia Street side of the building was installed in 1966 to commemorate the centennial of the union of the colonies of Vancouver Island and British Columbia; although it was later removed in 2017 as part of the Georgia Street plaza renovations. Shortly after the provincial courts moved out of the building, the building was renovated for museum use, and as a part of Arthur Erickson's redevelopment of Robson Square. The Annex Building is the only part of the building complex that was not converted for museum use.

The design of the building includes ionic columns, a central dome, formal porticos, and ornate stonework. The building was constructed using marble imported from Alaska, Tennessee, and Vermont. Construction for the building began in 1906 and replaced the previous courthouse at Victory Square. At the time, the building contained 18 courtrooms. An annex designed by Thomas Hooper was added to the western side of the building in 1912. It was declared a heritage site and retains the original judges' benches and walls as they were when the building was a courthouse.

A notable feature of the building is a pair of granite lions, placed on either side of the old entrance to the courthouse. They were carved from granite chunks brought from Nelson Island and placed in their current location in 1910. On November 4, 1942, two dynamite blasts damages the rear end of the western lion. The blasts also shattered the windows of surrounding hotels and cause some people to believe the city was under air attack. Two stonecutters who had worked on the original carvings and who were still working, John Whitworth and Herbert Ede, were hired to carve and fit new hindquarters; the join line is still visible. The culprits were never found.

=== Gathering place ===
The front lawn and steps of the building has hosted a number of public gatherings and protests. The building serves as the monthly meeting spot for Vancouver's Critical Mass, as well as flash mobs, the Zombie Walk, pro-marijuana rallies, and numerous environmental demonstrations. The steps on both the Robson Street and Georgia Street sides of the building are popular gathering spots for protest rallies. The Georgia Street side is also a popular place in the summertime for people to relax or socialize.

On February 12, 2007, the 2010 Olympic countdown clock was placed in the front lawn of the building. It was open for free for the public to see. The clock has since been disassembled after the games, with one half going to BC Place and the other to Whistler Village.

In June 2021, Cheryle Gunargie created a vigil in honour of the unmarked remains of children discovered at the Kamloops Indian Residential School. The vigil consists of 215 pairs of shoes, one for each of the children whose remains were discovered.

== Permanent collection ==
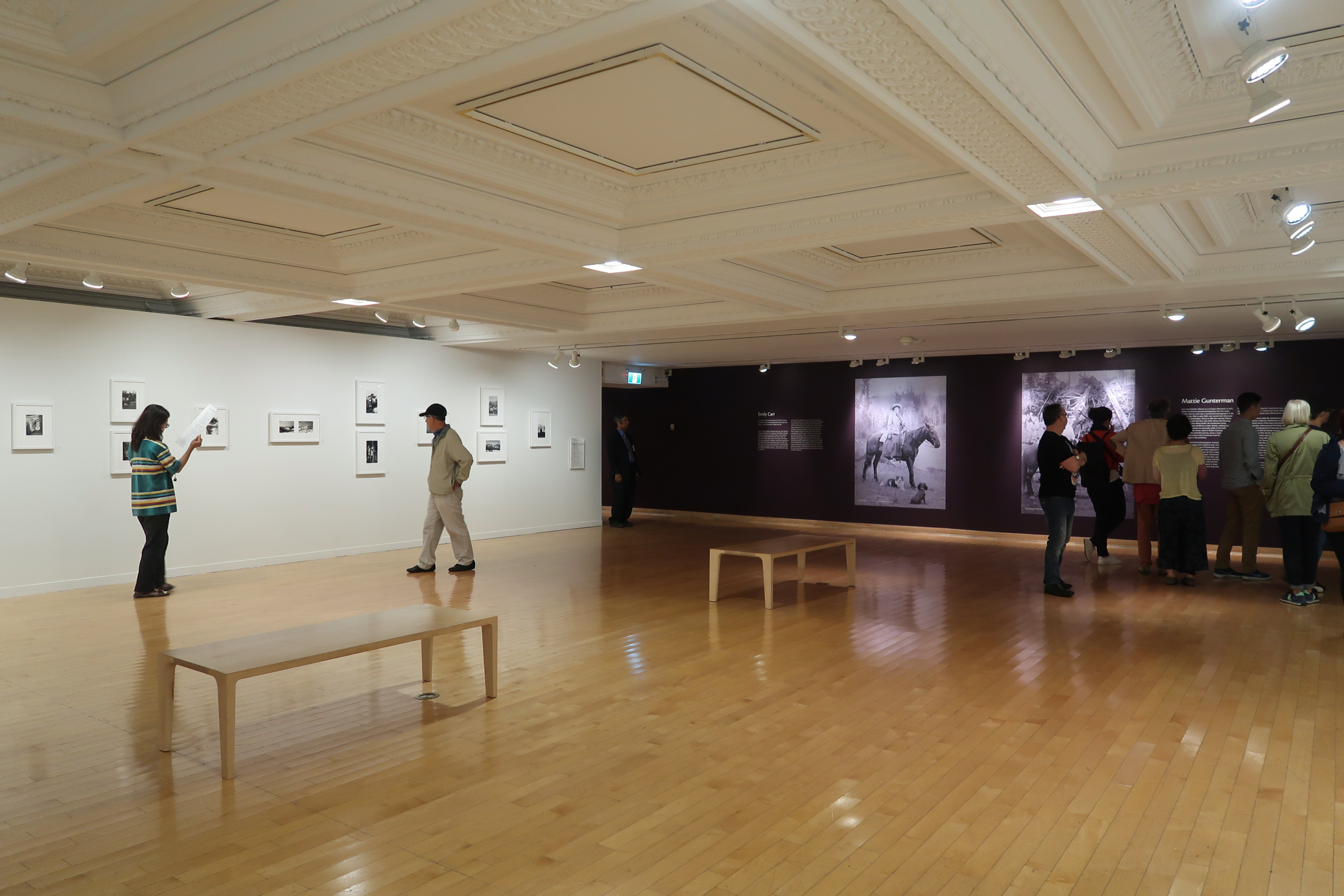
Works from the permanent collection exhibited in the museum

As of December 2018, the Vancouver Art Gallery's permanent collection had approximately 12,000 works by Canadian, and international artists. The museum's permanent collection is formally owned by the City of Vancouver, with the museum acting as the custodians for the collection under a lease and license agreement. The permanent collection acts as the principal repository of works produced in the Lower Mainland region, with museum acquisitions typically focused on historical and contemporary art from the region. Approximately half of the works in its collection were produced by artists from Western Canada. In addition to art from the region, the collection also has a focus on First Nations art, and art from Asia. The museum's collection is organized into several smaller areas, contemporary art from Asia, photography and conceptual photography, works by indigenous Canadian artists from the region, and artists from Vancouver and British Columbia.

The museum's photography and conceptual art collection includes photographs from the 1950s to the present, and includes photos by the N.E. Thing Co. artist collective, photographers of the Vancouver School of conceptual photography, and other artists including Dan Graham, Andreas Gursky, Thomas Ruff, Cindy Sherman, Robert Smithson, and Thomas Struth. The museum's collection of contemporary Asian art includes works by Eikoh Hosoe, Mariko Mori, Fiona Tan, Jin-me Yoon, Reena Saini Kallat, Song Dong, Wang Du, Wang Jianwei, Yang Fudong, and O Zhang.

=== Canadian art ===
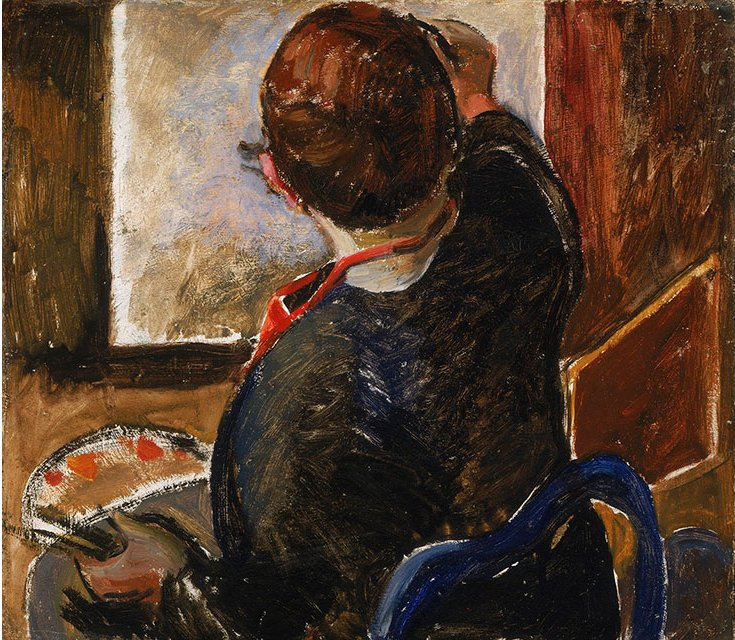
Untitled (Self-Portrait) by Emily Carr, c. 1924–25. The collection has a number of works by Carr.

Serving as a repository for art for the region, the museum holds a number of works by artists based in the Lower Mainland, in addition to artists based in other regions of British Columbia.

The museum's collection includes works from Canadian artists, including members of the Group of Seven, Gathie Falk, Michael Snow, and Joyce Wieland. The museum's collection also features a significant number of works by Emily Carr, dating from 1913 to 1942. The painting Totem Poles, Kitseukla, by Carr, was among the original set of works acquired for the museum's collection prior to opening in 1931. As of 2023, the museum has over 250 works by Carr. The permanent collections of the Vancouver Art Gallery, along with the collections of the National Gallery of Canada, hold the largest number of works by Carr of any collection in the world.

The museum's also features a collection of indigenous Canadian art from the region, including works from Haida, Heiltsuk, Inuit, Kwakwakaʼwakw, Nuu-chah-nulth, Nuxalk, and Tlingit artists. Regular acquisitions of indigenous Canadian works was undertaken by the museum beginning in the 1980s; with the museum's practices prior to the 1980s typically leaving the acquisition of indigenous Canadian works for the collections of ethnographic, or history museums. In 2015, George Gund III bequeathed to the museum 37 First Nations works, including totem poles by Ken Mowatt and Norman Tait, drawings by Bill Reid, and thirteen carved works by Robert Davidson. Other works in the museum's indigenous Canadian collection includes works by Sonny Assu, Rebecca Belmore, Dempsey Bob, Dana Claxton, Joe David, Reg Davidson, Beau Dick, Brian Jungen, Marianne Nicolson, and Lawrence Paul Yuxweluptun.

=== Selected works ===
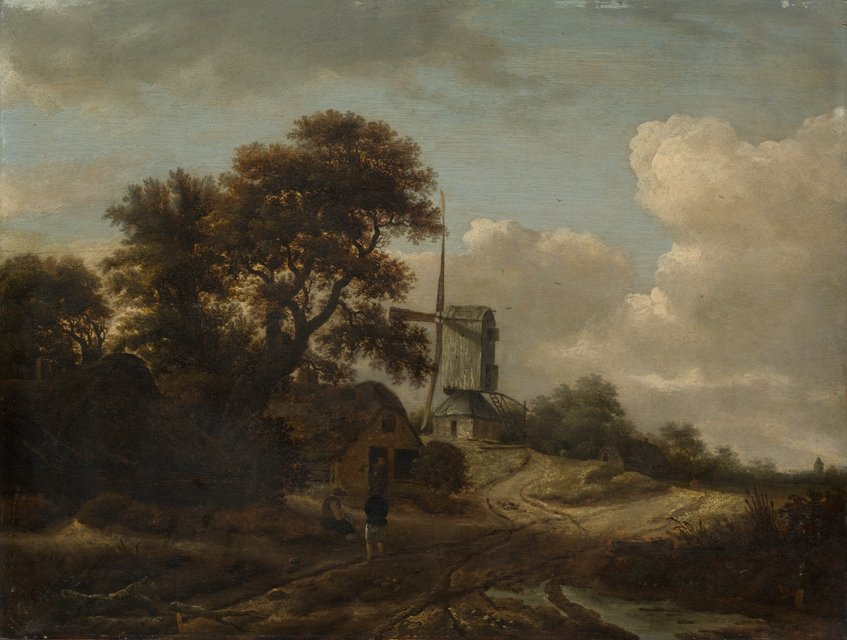
Roelof de Vries, Landscape with Stream and Windmill, unknown date.

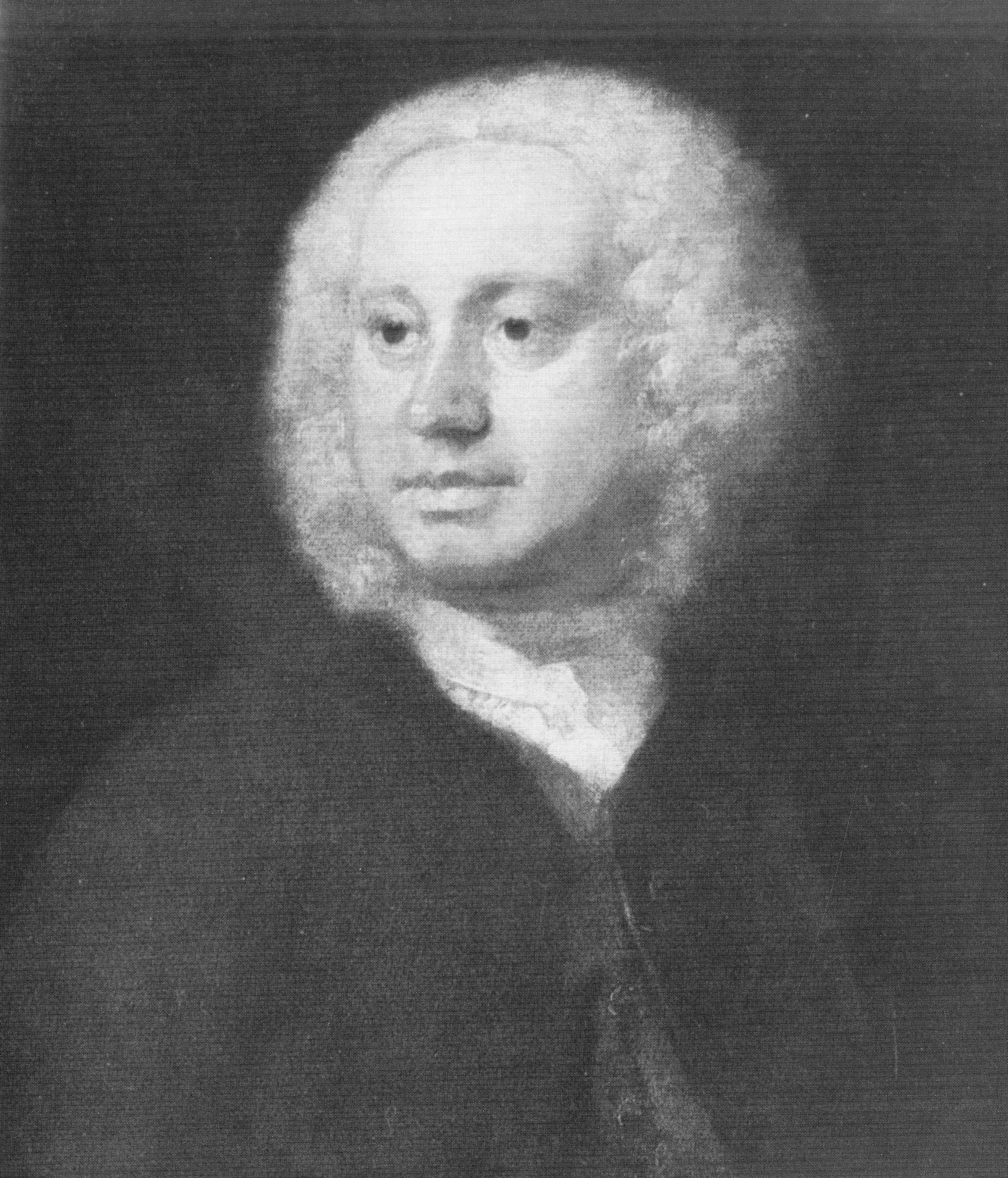
William Hogarth, Portrait of Mr. Bridgeman, c. 1725–1730

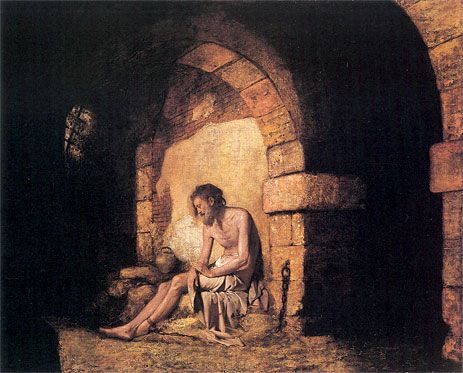
Joseph Wright of Derby, The Captive from Sterne, 1774

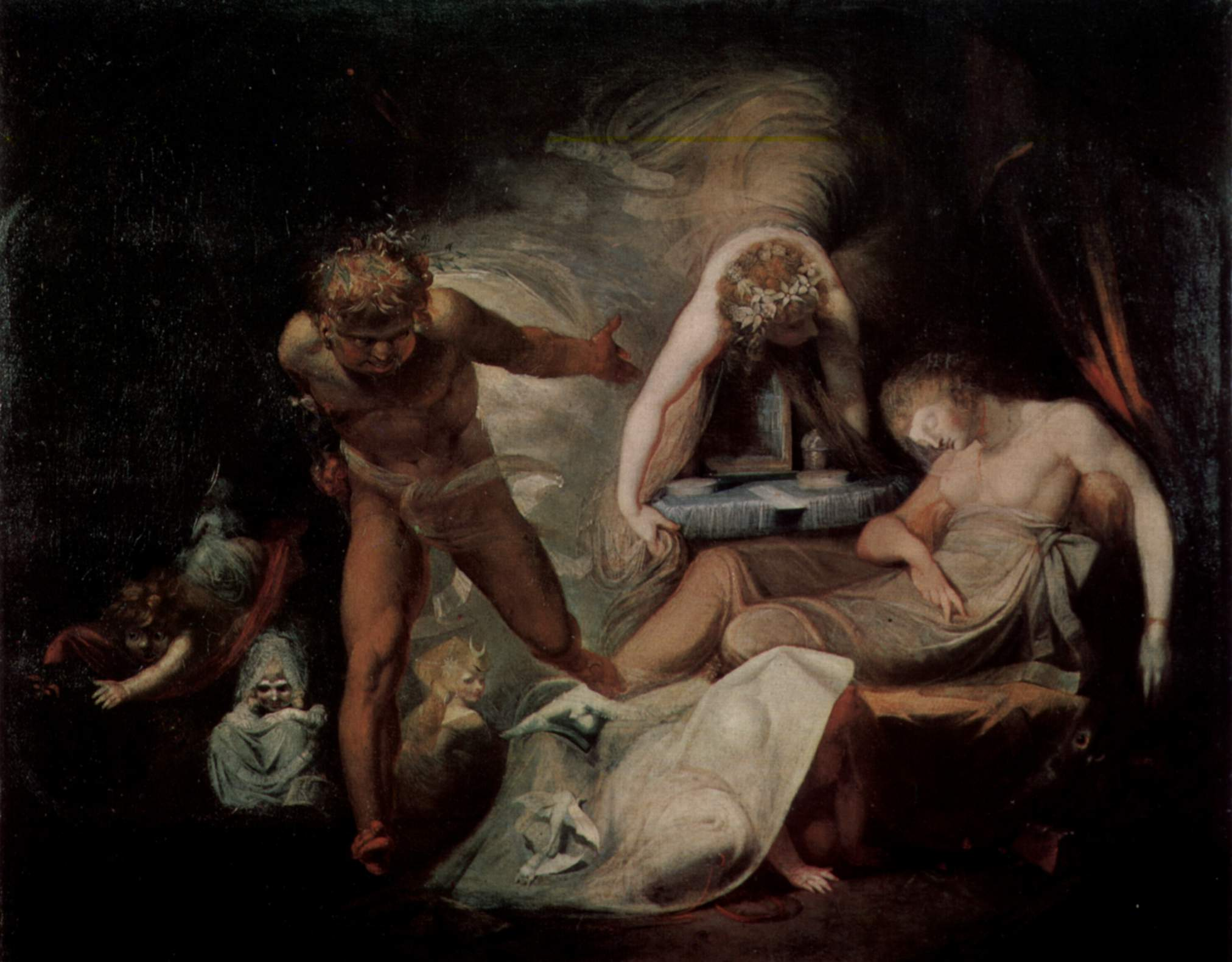
Henry Fuseli, Dream of Belinda, c. 1780–1790

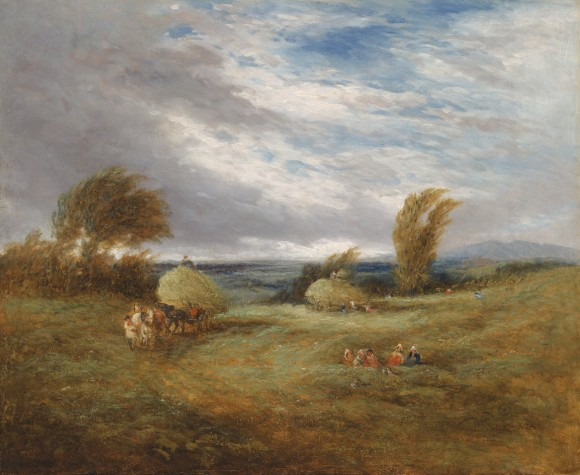
David Cox, In the Hayfield, 1850

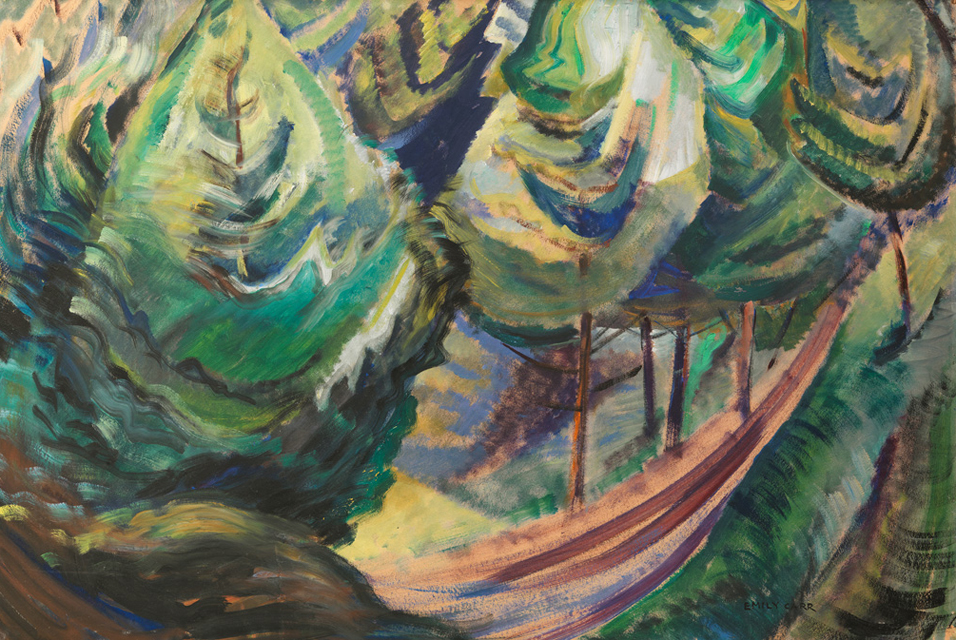
Emily Carr, Path among Pines, c. 1930

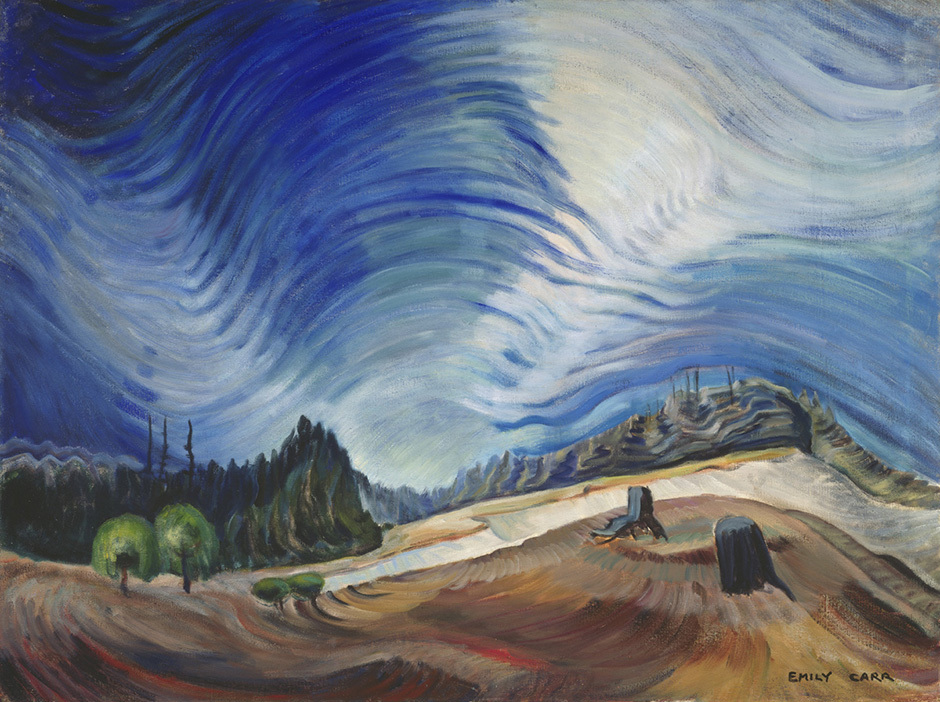
Emily Carr, Above the Gravel Pitt, 1937

== Library and archive ==
The Vancouver Art Gallery Library and Archives is a non-circulating library that specializes in modern, contemporary and Canadian art. Its holdings include more than 50,000 books and exhibition catalogues, 30 journal subscriptions, 5,000 files that document various artists, art forms, and works. Access to the museum's library and archives is currently not available to the public.

The museum's archives contain the institution's official records since its founding in 1931. In addition to institutional documents, the archives also includes files from B.C. Binning, and the books and serials where Bill Bissett's concrete poetry was published.

== Programs ==
The Vancouver Art Gallery offers a wide range of public programs throughout the year, including live performances marketed under the FUSE program, scholar's lectures, artist's talks, as well as dance and musical performances. In its most recent year, the gallery has featured over 60 presenters, including historian Timothy Brook, writer Sarah Milroy, and Emily Carr scholar, Gerta Moray. In May 2015, the gallery welcomed architect Jacques Herzog as he presented his first lecture in Canada on architecture and the new Vancouver Art Gallery building.

== See also ==
- List of art museums
- List of museums in British Columbia
