= Law Courts (Vancouver) =

Court building in British Columbia, Canada

Coordinates: 49.2808°N 123.1236°W

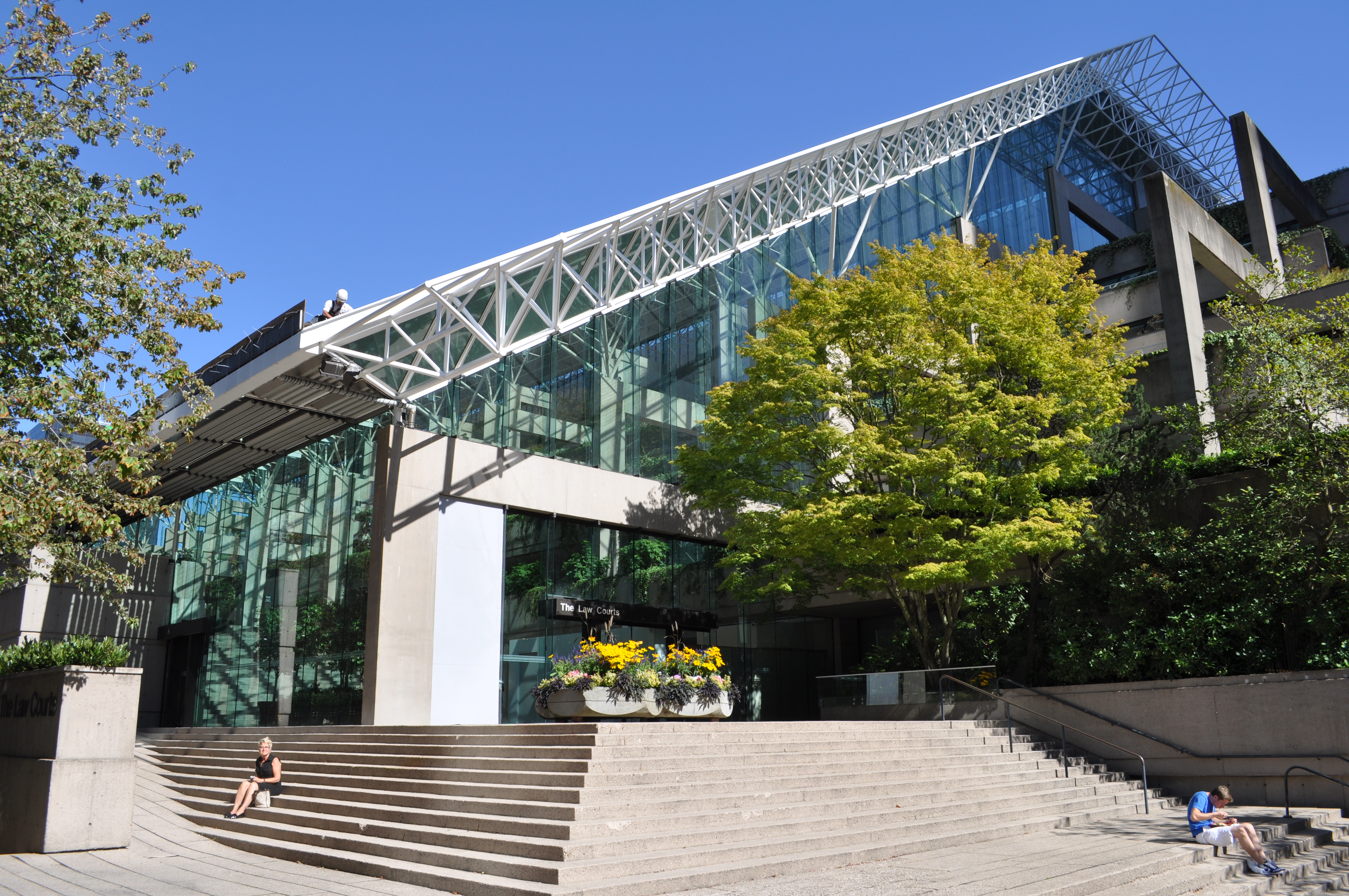
Main entry from Hornby and Nelson Streets

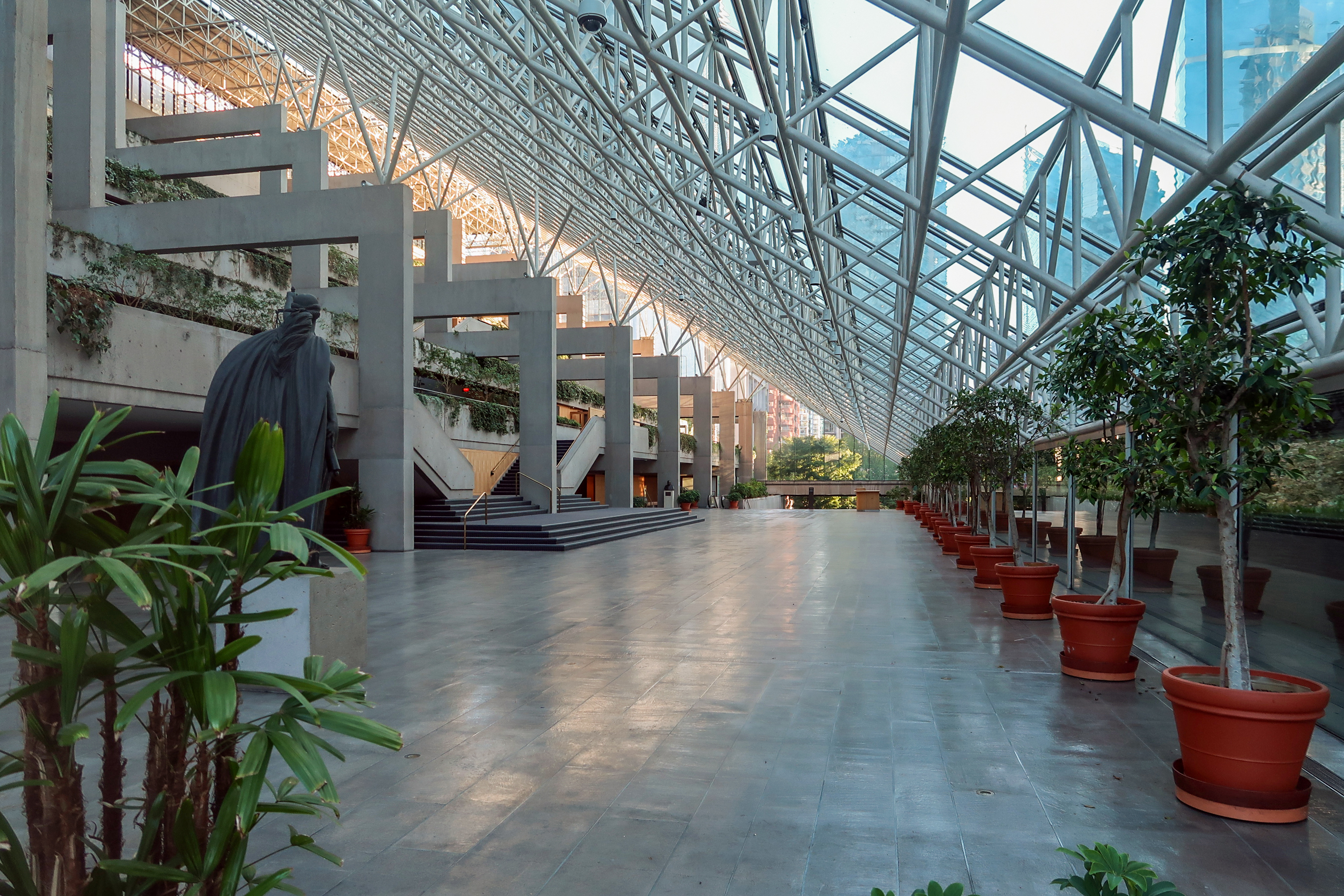
Interior atrium

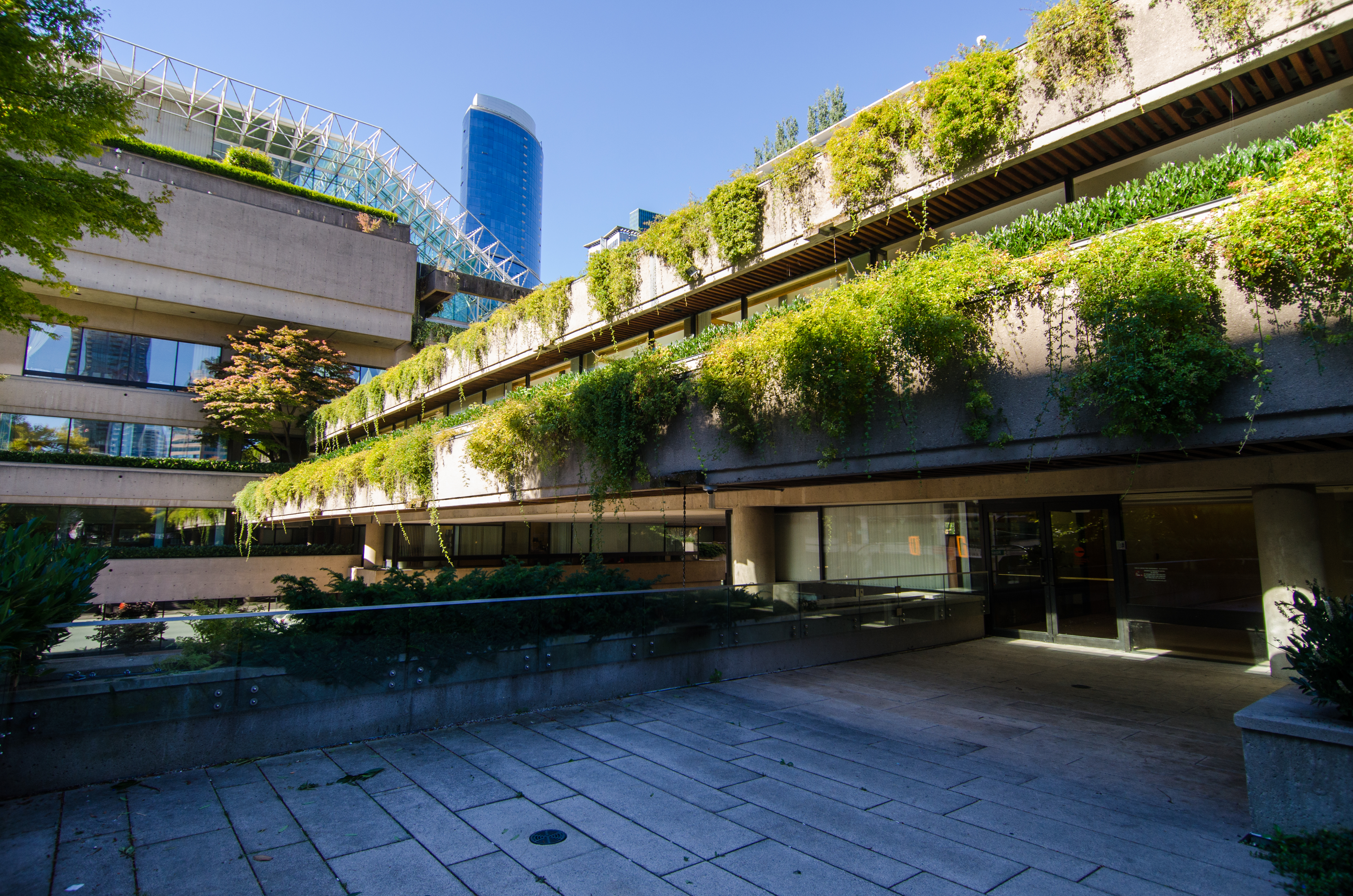
Outside garden

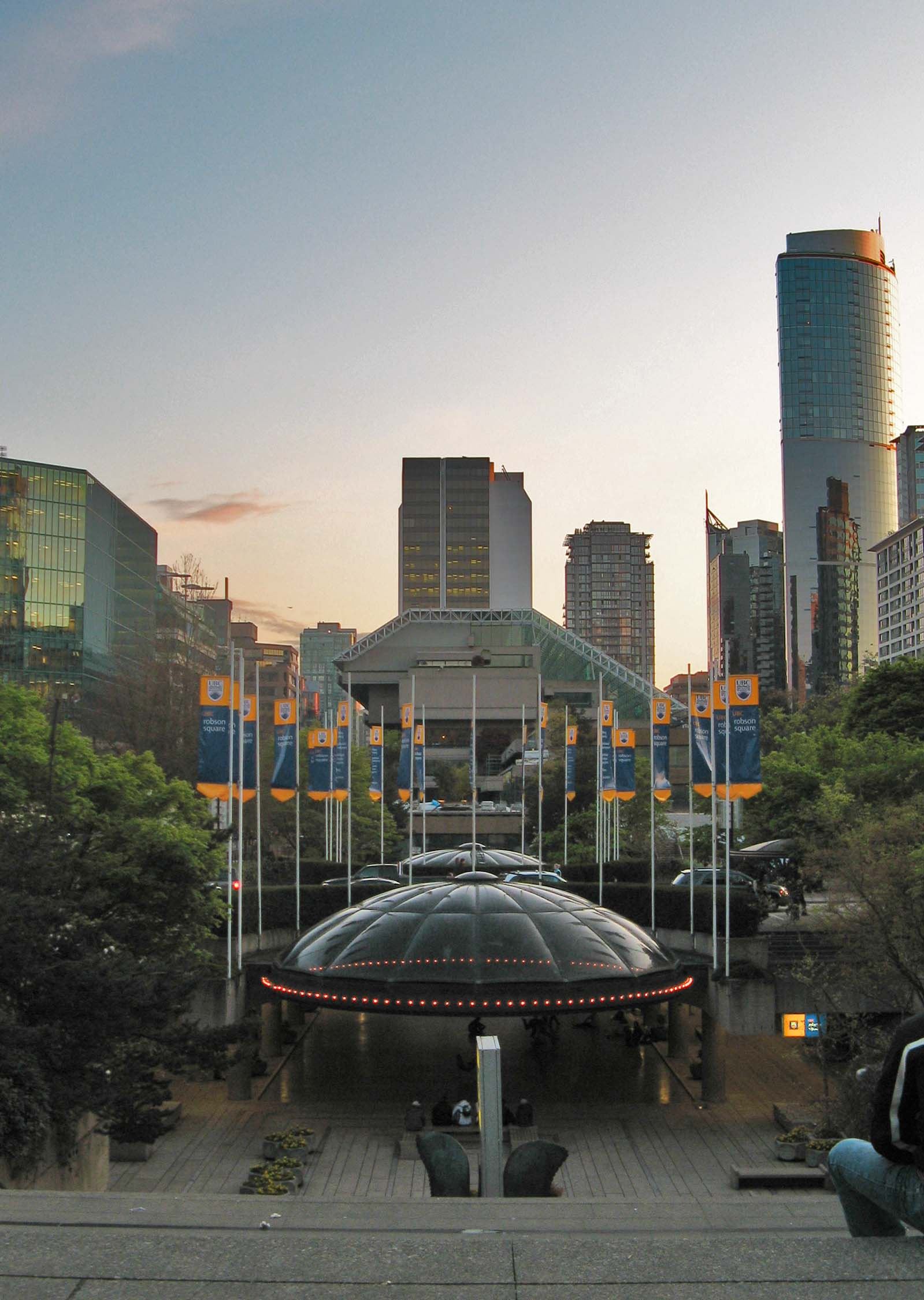
The sloping glass roof of the Law Courts, behind Robson Square in the foreground, as seen from the Vancouver Art Gallery

The Law Courts building is part of the landmark Robson Square complex in downtown Vancouver, British Columbia, Canada. It was designed by renowned Canadian architect Arthur Erickson. The Law Courts building occupies the southern block of the three city block complex, provincial government offices the middle block, and the Vancouver Art Gallery the northern block. The building is used exclusively by the two higher courts of the Province of British Columbia: the Supreme Court and the Court of Appeal.

== Background ==
The project began as The British Columbia Centre, a provincial government project to replace the neo-Classical courthouse forming the northern of the three Robson Square blocks which now houses the Vancouver Art Gallery. The proposed 50-storey tower, at 208 metres (682 feet), would have been the tallest skyscraper in the city (and taller than the Living Shangri-La, which holds the record as of 2011). In 1972 the provincial government of WAC Bennett was defeated by the NDP government of Dave Barrett. Just as the tower's construction phase was about to begin the plan was scrapped and Arthur Erickson Architects was commissioned to create a new design in 1973. The concept was revised into a "horizontal highrise", "B.C. Centre on its back." The inspiration for this has been credited both to the architect and to the government minister responsible for the courts. The building opened in 1979 with a ceremony on September 6 featuring Lord Denning.

== Architecture ==
The building is a 7-storey structure housing 35 courtrooms and is 42 metres (138 ft) in height. It is largely covered by a roof of green-tinted glass over a space-frame structure covering approximately 50,000 square feet (4,645 m2), more than one acre, of occupied space. The entry and public circulation spaces are open to this roof, forming a large skylit indoor public atrium. Access is directly from the street and by an upper-level walkway connecting to the Robson Square rooftop garden to the north, forming a three-block accessible-for-all roof integrated into the city core. Its innovative architecture and urban design have been recognized as one of the world-renowned landmarks of downtown Vancouver, incorporating "a style that remains connected to the surroundings, with a sensitivity for nature and the environment."

Erickson described his concept as: "This won’t be a corporate monument. Let’s turn it on its side and let people walk all over it."

The tan-coloured concrete structure is exposed on the exterior and interior of the building. The other main exterior material is green-tinted glass. The late-modernist geometric form and hard materials are softened by an extensive use of landscaping around the building, in a series of horizontal planters terracing up from street level into the large public indoor atrium, and on the rooftop terrace. The landscape design was undertaken in Erickson's office by landscape architect Cornelia Oberlander. Incorporating trees and landscaping into a building was a new concept for Vancouver at the time.

== Awards ==
The architecture and landscape architecture have received acclaim for excellence in design.

- In 2011 the Royal Architectural Institute of Canada (RAIC) awarded its Prix du XXe siècle Award to the complex, describing the concept of a "linear urban park, importing nature into the city", as "a bold, contemplative work of urban design."
- In 1982 the RAIC's awarded the Governor General's Gold Medal to the complex.
- In 1979 The American Society of Landscape Architects awarded its President's Award for Excellence, noting the project's "extraordinary integration of landscape architecture with architecture".
