= Barbara Astman =

Canadian artist (born 1950)

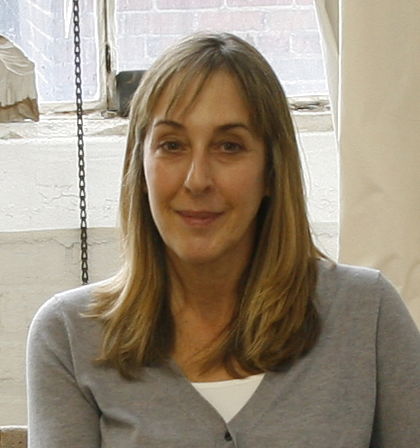
- Barbara Astman in her studio
- Born: Barbara Anne Astman; 12 July 1950 (age 76); Rochester, New York, U.S.
- Education: RIT (School for American Craftsmen), OCA
- Awards: Ontario Arts Council, Canada Council
- Website: www.barbaraastman.com

Barbara Anne Astman RCA (born 12 July 1950) is a Canadian artist who has recruited instant camera technology, colour xerography, and digital scanners to explore her inner thoughts.

== Early life and career ==
Astman was born in Rochester, New York, the second of three children of Bertha (née Meisel, a homemaker) and George Astman (an auto mechanic and salesman.) She received her associate degree at the Rochester Institute of Technology's School for American Craftsmen in 1970. That year, she moved to Toronto, Ontario, Canada to study at the Ontario College of Art (now OCAD University,) and graduated with an associate degree (A.O.C.A.) in 1973. She joined the faculty of OCAD in 1975, served as chair of photography (2001–2002), and professor in the faculty of art (2002–2021). She retired in 2021 as professor emerita.

== Work ==
Since the early 1970s Astman has explored a wide range of photo-based media and produced work, which has received recognition in Canada and abroad.

Her first public solo exhibition immediately upon graduating from OCA (OCADU) was held in 1973, at Toronto's Baldwin Street Gallery of Photography. Two years later, the Still Photography Division of the National Film Board of Canada renamed as the Canadian Museum of Contemporary Photography, Ottawa and now part of the National Gallery of Canada, hosted her first museum show.

Since then, she has had an extensive and prestigious solo exhibition history. Her major touring retrospective exhibition, Barbara Astman - Personal/Persona - A 20 Year Survey was curated by Liz Wylie (Art Gallery of Hamilton, 1995). In May 2011, her installation, Dancing with Che: Enter through the Gift Shop (Kelowna Art Gallery, 2013) toured across Canada. Barbara Astman: I as artifact featured a new series of works accompanied by a comprehensive publication (McIntosh Gallery, 2014) and Barbara Astman Looking: Then and Now (Corkin Gallery), a two-part exhibition received recognition in 2016.

She has been included in major group exhibitions, such as: Beautiful Fictions (AGO, 2009); Light My Fire Part I: Some Propositions about Portraits and Photography (AGO, 2013); Herland, (60 Wall Gallery, New York 2014);Look Again: Colour Xerography Art Meets Technology (AGO, 2015); Living Building Thinking: Art and Expressionism (McMaster Museum of Art, 2016), and Toronto: Tributes + Tributaries, 1971–1989 (AGO, 2016), among many others. In 2024, her work was included in the Winnipeg Art Gallery's four-person exhibition featuring work from the permanent collection Animating the Figure with Photography along with the work of Donigan Cumming, Adad Hannah, and Stephen Livick.

Astman is represented by Corkin Gallery, Toronto and Paul Kyle Gallery, Vancouver.

Her artist's archives are held in the E.P. Taylor Research Library & Archives Special Collections, Art Gallery of Ontario.

== Commissions ==
She has completed several public art commissions, including a floor installation for the Calgary Winter Olympics (1987), a public art installation for the new Canadian Embassy in Berlin, Germany (2005), consisting of a fritted glass tower wall; the Murano on Bay in Toronto consisted of 217 windows with photo-based imagery (2010); and a photographic installation (The Fossil Book) for the inaugural exhibition at the new Koffler Gallery (Toronto, 2013).

== Service to the arts community ==
Astman has served on numerous boards and advisory committees, including the Art Gallery of Ontario's Board of Trustees (2009–2013) and as the chair of the Art Advisory Committee, Koffler Gallery, Toronto and vice president, board of directors, prefix (ICA) Institute of Contemporary Art, Toronto.

In addition, she has co-curated an installation titled The Emergence of Feminism: Changing the Course of Art, featuring work by Joyce Wieland, Suzy Lake and Lisa Steele (AGO, 2008).

== Awards ==
In 2000, she was elected to the Royal Canadian Academy of Arts. In 2024, she was awarded a Governor General's Awards in Visual and Media Arts.

== Public collections ==
Astman is represented in important public, corporate and private collections in Canada and abroad including the National Gallery of Canada, Ottawa, the Bibliothèque Nationale, Paris, Art Gallery of Ontario, Toronto, Deutche Bank, New York, and the Victoria and Albert Museum, London.

The following permanent collections, among others, hold her work:

- Agnes Etherington Art Centre, Queen's University, Kingston, ON
- Art Gallery of Hamilton, Hamilton, ON
- Art Gallery of Ontario, Toronto, ON
- Bibliothèque Nationale, Paris
- Burnaby Art Gallery, Burnaby, British Columbia
- The Robert McLaughlin Gallery, Oshawa, ON
- George Eastman Museum, Rochester, New York
- McIntosh Gallery, University of Western Ontario, London, ON
- Museum of Fine Arts, Houston
- National Gallery of Canada, Ottawa
- The University of Toronto Art Museum
- Oklahoma City Museum of Art
- Victoria and Albert Museum, London
- Winnipeg Art Gallery, Winnipeg, MB

== Critical reception ==
Canadian Art magazine featured a profile of Astman's career in the Spring 2014 issue.

The Clementine Suite

"...a celebration of the human spirit."

Dancing With Che

"...echoes across more than a century of technological innovation and evolution of the medium".
"Audacious, humorous, improbable."

Wonderland

"Intimate, personal, and quietly enthralling."
