= Robson Square =

Civic centre and plaza in Vancouver, British Columbia, Canada

- Public square
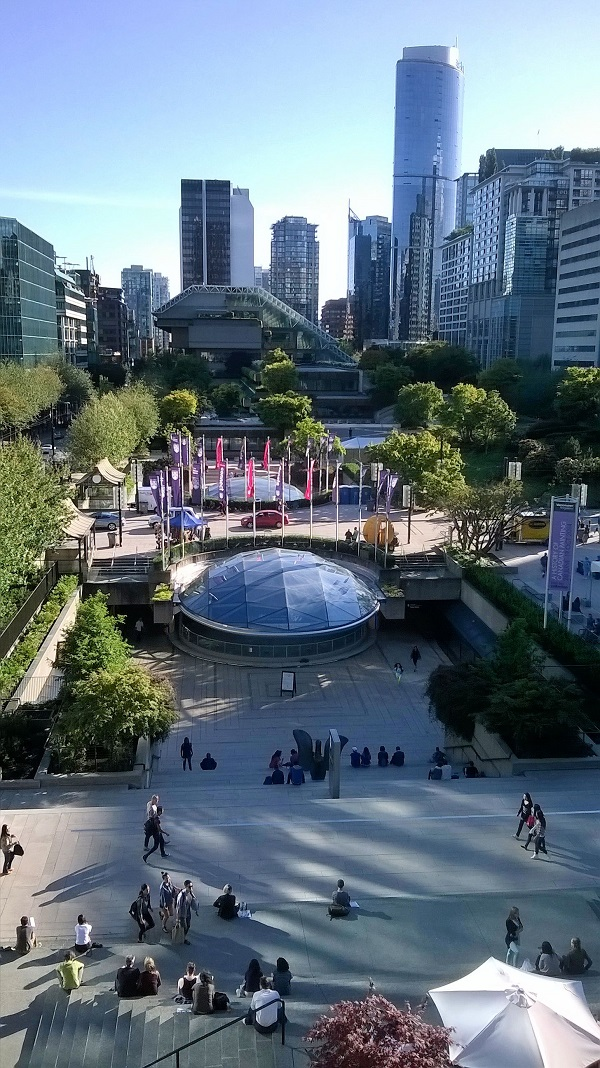
- Robson Square Plaza
- Features: Skating rink, waterfalls
- Design: Arthur Erickson (plan); Cornelia Oberlander (landscape)
- Opened: 1983
- Surface: concrete, grass
- Location: Vancouver, British Columbia, Canada
- Location of Robson Square in Vancouver
- Coordinates: 49°16′55″N 123°7′19″W
- Website: www.robsonsquare.com

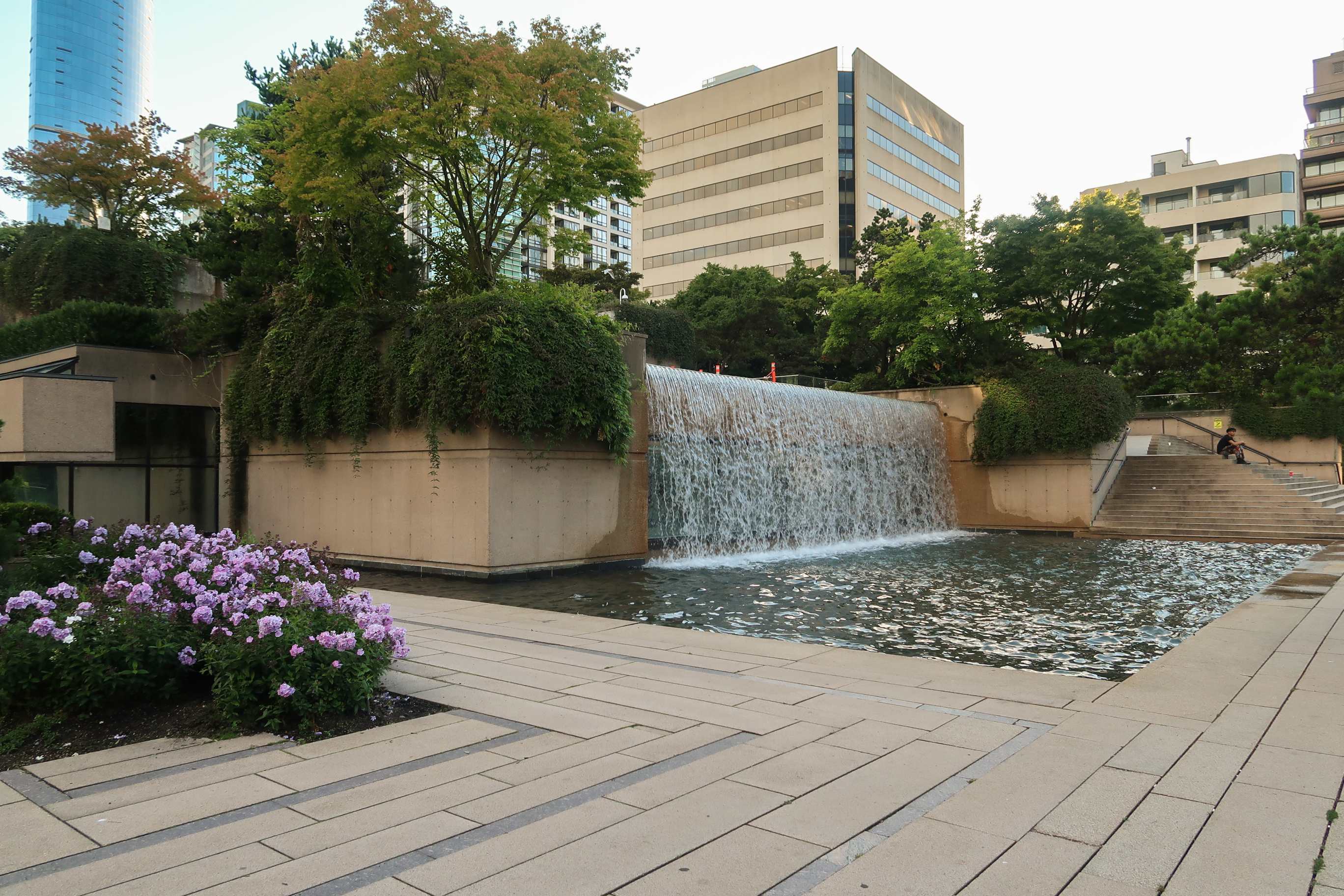
Waterfall

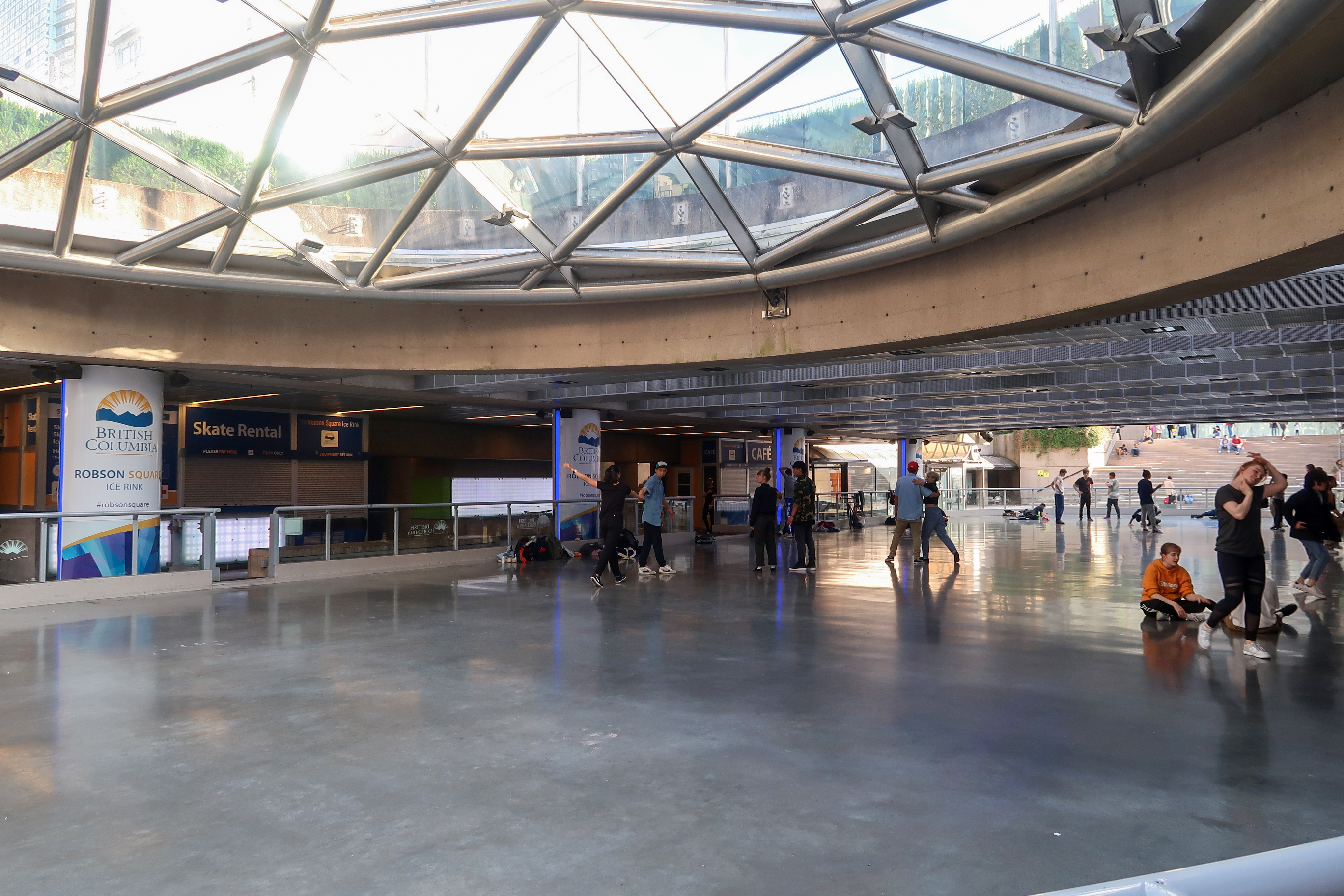
Robson Square Ice Rink

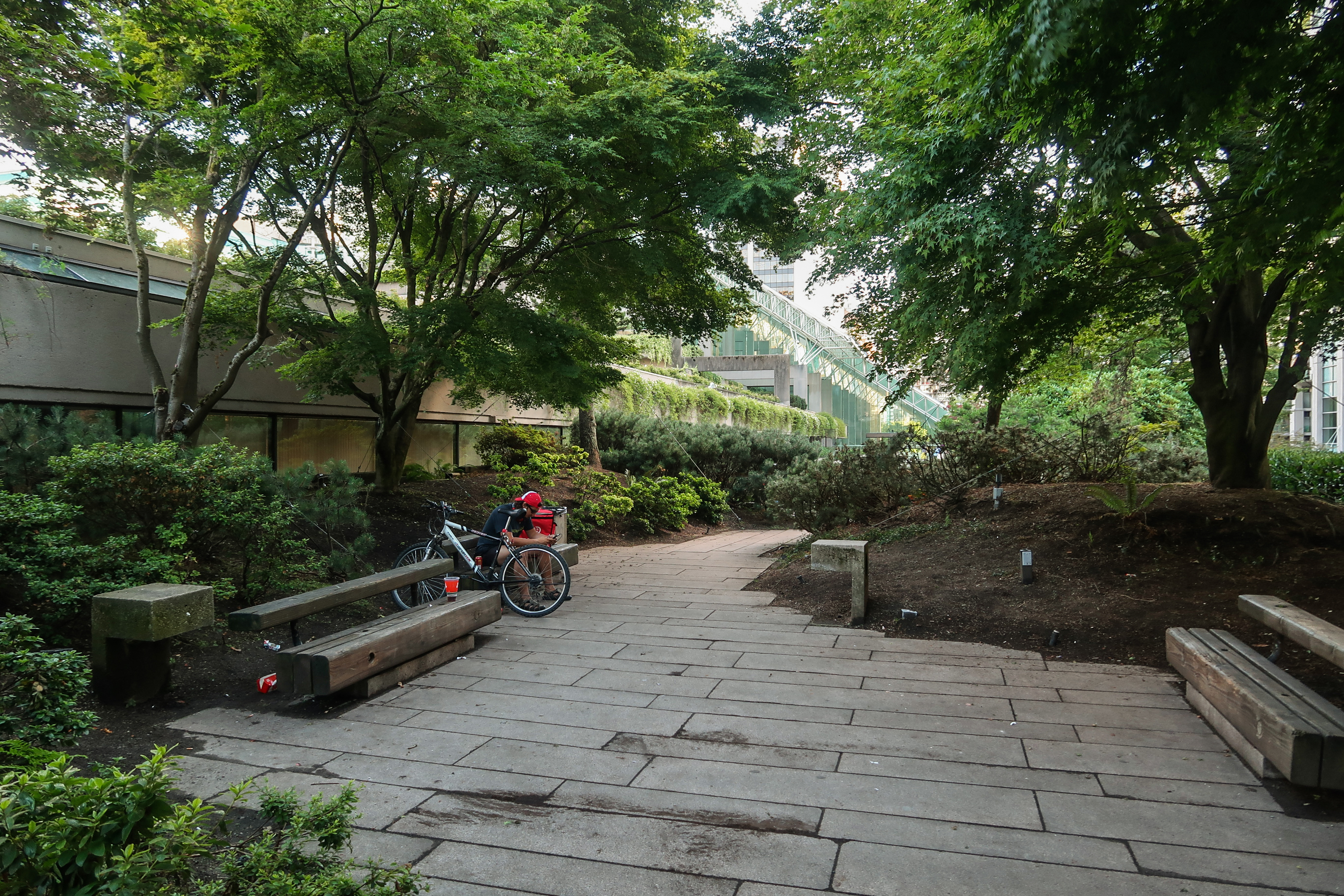
Garden pathway

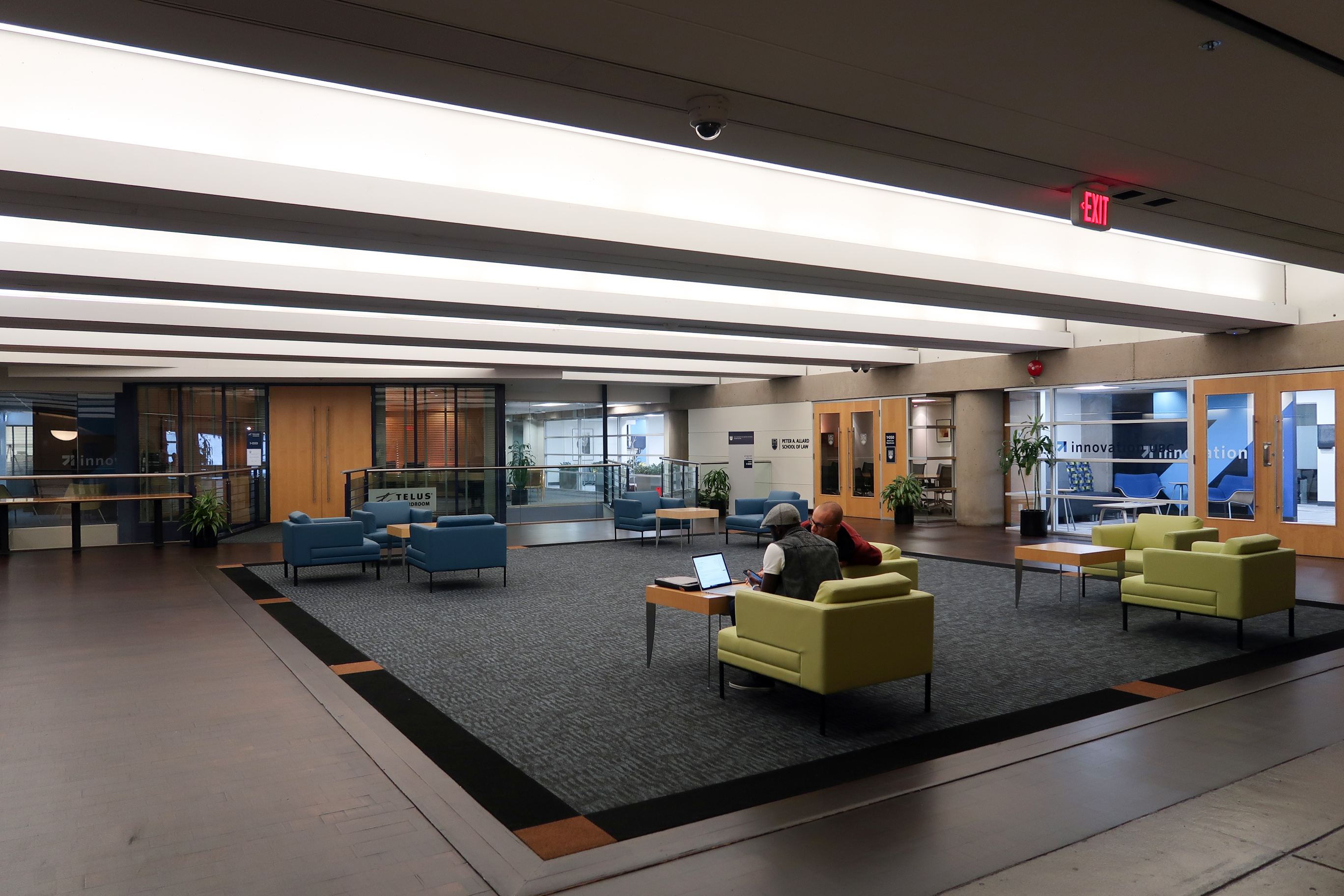
UBC Robson Square

Robson Square is a landmark civic centre and public plaza, located in Downtown Vancouver, British Columbia. It is the site of the Provincial Law Courts, UBC Robson Square, government office buildings, and public space connecting the newer development to the Vancouver Art Gallery.

== Background ==
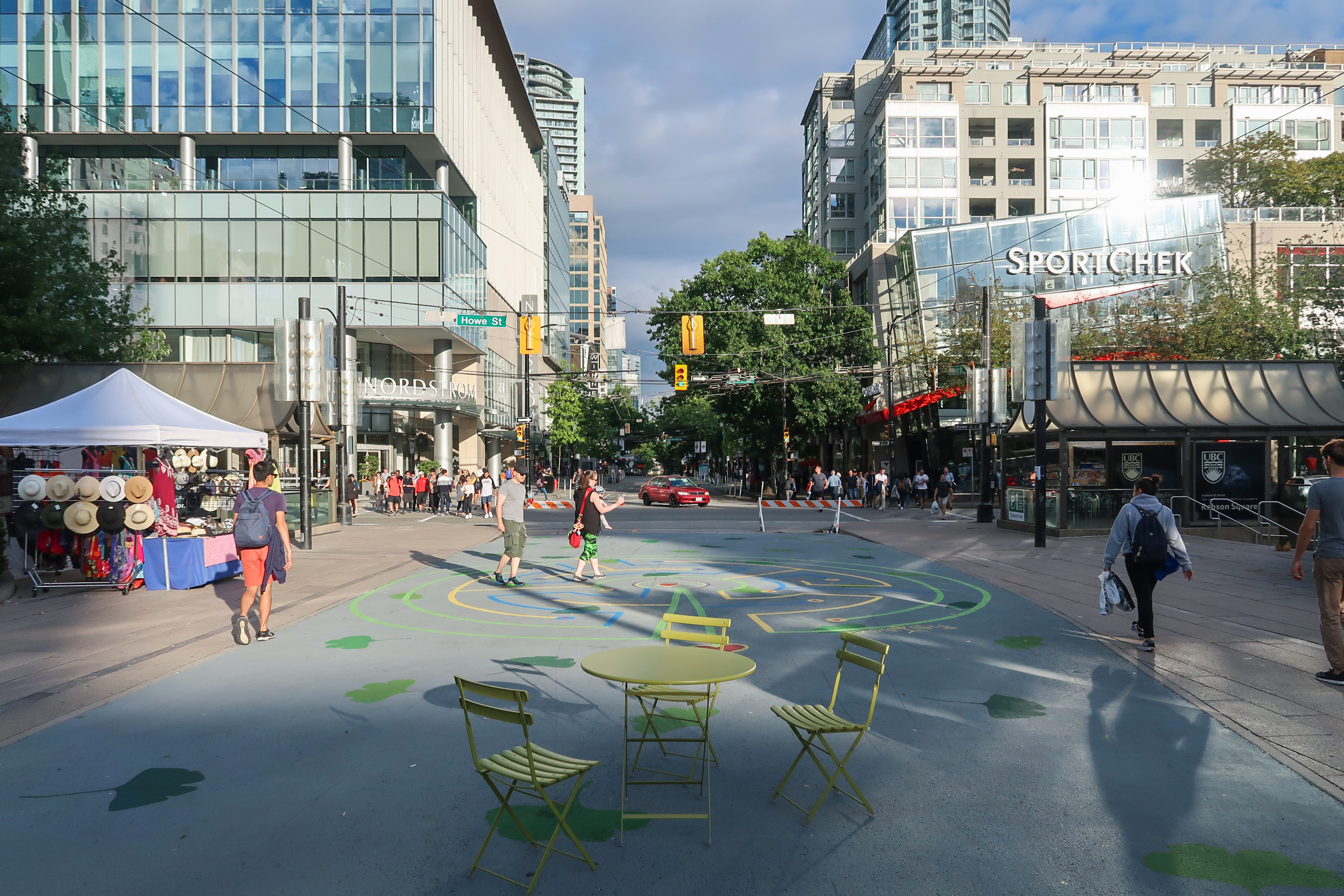
Robson Square Street share space in 2018 Summer

The British Columbia Centre was a development proposal slated to be completed by 1975. At 208 metres (682 feet), it would have been the tallest skyscraper in the city (and taller by just 7 meters) than the Living Shangri-La, (which currently holds the record). With the defeat of W.A.C. Bennett's Social Credit government in 1972, the plan was scrapped just as the construction phase was about to begin. Government officials saw this potential Skyscraper as a potential disruption to the current Vancouver Skyline. The New Democratic Party government of Dave Barrett responded to fears of the dark shadow that the building would cast on downtown, and commissioned a redesign from another architectural firm, Arthur Erickson Architects. The reconceptualization Erickson came up with was of a skyscraper laid on its back, the "B.C. Centre on its back."

Erickson biographer Nicholas Olsberg describes the design as follows:

Arthur came in and said 'This won't be a corporate monument. Let's turn it on its side and let people walk all over it.' And he anchored it in such a way with the courts — the law — at one end and the museum — the arts — at the other. The foundations of society. And underneath it all, the government offices quietly supporting their people. It's almost a spiritual progression.

== Features ==
The new development was completed between 1979 and 1983, encompassing three city blocks and providing 1,300,000 square feet (120,774 m^{2}) of space. The main component is the glass-covered Law Courts, which houses 35 courtrooms in the southern block. It is 42 metres (138 ft) in height, and the glass roof has a size of 420 by 115 feet (128 by 35 m), is supported by a steel space frame structure, covering approximately 50,000 square feet (4,645 m^{2}) of public space.

The central block contains provincial government offices and, more recently, portions of the University of British Columbia's downtown satellite campus, UBC Robson Square, housed in the lower level. Above, three cascading waterfalls throughout the complex provide natural air conditioning with 850,000 US gallons (3,218 m^{3}; 707,773 imp gal) of water. An outdoor skating rink is located at the lower level that extends below Robson Street and connects to the northern block with the Vancouver Art Gallery, which was renovated as part of the project.

Typical of Erickson's designs, Robson Square is constructed primarily out of concrete, but softened by its environmental design. In addition to the water features are trees and other flora as well as gradually inclining stairs with an integrated ramp. The open design allows for relatively unobstructed natural light and fresh air, and the waterfalls divert from the noise of downtown traffic. Landscaping on the project was designed by Cornelia Oberlander.

This public square has been highly utilized due to its successful design. As referenced by William H. Whyte, plazas need specific elements to unlock the potential of an area for proper utilization and enjoyment. The Robson Square experience is considered successful, from a designer's point of view, because it follows Whyte's Street Life Project guidelines. The complex was completed in three stages at a cost of $139 million. The provincial government offices were finished first in 1978, the Law Courts the following year, and the renovation of the old provincial court building into the new Vancouver Art Gallery was completed in 1983, a decade after the design was started.

As of November 23, 2009, Robson Square has been reopened following a multimillion-dollar reconstruction project. Its reopening can be directly attributed to the 2010 Olympic Winter Games in Vancouver and Whistler. Robson Square provides the only public outdoor skating rink in Vancouver.

The rink area is used in the milder months for various public events including Ballroom & Salsa dancing, and is also the hub for Vancouver's Street Dance community since the late 90s. The skating rink is open in the winter; as of the 2024–25 season, admission is free and skate rentals are $5.00.

== Awards and criticism ==
The architecture and landscape architecture have received acclaim for excellence in design.

- In 2011, the Royal Architectural Institute of Canada (RAIC) awarded its Prix du XXe siècle Award to the complex, describing the concept of a "linear urban park, importing nature into the city", as "a bold, contemplative work of urban design."
- In 1982, the RAIC's awarded the Governor General's Gold Medal to the complex.
- In 1979, The American Society of Landscape Architects awarded its President's Award for Excellence, noting the project's "extraordinary integration of landscape architecture with architecture".

As in much of Alvar Aalto's architecture, large and complex buildings may be rendered as though they were natural extensions of the topography in which they are situated. This paradigm was surely the primary motivation behind Arthur Erickson's Robson Square development, Vancouver (1983), wherein a megastructure comprising law courts and municipal offices was integrated with a parking garage in such a way as to assume the profile of a stepped escarpment. This last, laid out to the designs of the landscape architect Cornelia Oberlander, features an ornamental sheet of water 90 metres (300 feet) long that cascades over the large plate-glass picture window enclosing the registry office. This artificial architectonic earthwork running through the centre of Vancouver has since been confirmed as a main spine within the city by the medium-rise towers that have grown up around its axis spontaneously over the last decade. In this regard Robson Square has served as an urban catalyst in much the same way as the Rockefeller Center drew the fabric of Manhattan around itself at the end of the 1930s.

— Kenneth Frampton, Modern Architecture: A Critical History p. 349-350

One of the main points of accessibility that this plaza has offered its users is an entry feature called the Robson Square Steps. This design has been highly utilized and considered a great achievement of the designer, Arthur Erikson. In 2019, accessibility consultant Arnold Cheng called into question the safety of the Robson Square Steps, pointing at the steepness of the ramp as a concern. Additionally, the visually impaired were referenced in his safety concerns about the 40-year-old ramp and stairway design combination.
