= Charmaine Lurch =

Canadian painter and sculptor

- Born: Kingston, Jamaica
- Education: York University, Sheridan College, OCAD University
- Known for: Work on Thornton and Lucie Blackburn, Works on intersection of race and environment

Charmaine Lurch is a Toronto-based painter, sculptor, installation artist and arts educator known for her interdisciplinary work and exploration of themes including Black studies and environmental issues.

== Early life and education ==
Lurch was born in Jamaica and came to Canada at the age of nine. She holds a master's degree in Environmental Studies from York University and diplomas in design and illustration from Sheridan College, both in Ontario. In addition, she studied at the Ontario College of Art and Design University in Toronto, and the School of Visual Arts in New York City

== Work ==
Lurch's work often incorporates themes of world histories, Black history, diversity, equity and environmental issues. She is active as an art educator in Toronto. As a lead artist with the non-profit group Inner City Angels, Lurch lead interdisciplinary public art projects involving art education. Her sculpture Bees is installed in the Regent Park social housing development in Toronto. She cites artists including Lynette Yiadom Boakye, Jasmine Thomas-Grivan, Denyse Thomasos, and Theaster Gates as inspirations. Lurch has been critical of the way the traditional power structures of the art world systematically exclude artists of colour. Her work excavates the social, political, economic, and ecological entanglements that connect life to land, to labour, and to collective survival. Freedom seekers building infrastructure, bees sustaining ecosystems, pollen carrying futures, and Bob Marley's voice urging us to move forward all appear in her installations.

== Major exhibitions ==
Lurch's work has been exhibited at a number of venues including the Royal Ontario Museum, Nuit Blanche, the University of British Columbia, and the National Gallery of Jamaica. Her work A Mobile and Visible Carriage was prominently featured in the group show Every.Now.Then at the Art Gallery of Ontario in 2017.

- Compounding Vision, solo exhibition at RiverBrink Art Museum, 2019-20
- Critical Mass, Art Gallery of Guelph, 2018-19
- Settling in Place: Aylan Couchie, Martha Griffith, Charmaine Lurch, MacLaren Art Centre, 2018
- Here We Are Here, Royal Ontario Museum and Montreal Museum of Fine Arts, 2018
- Every. Now. Then.: Reframing Nationhood, Art Gallery of Ontario, 2017
