= Ben Portis =

Canadian artist, curator (1960-2017)

- Born: December 9, 1960
- Died: July 20, 2017 (aged 56)
- Known for: artist, curator, critic

Ben Portis (December 9, 1960 – July 20, 2017) was a Canadian artist, curator, and critic working in the fields of contemporary art including sound art, performance, music, and architecture.

== Biography ==
Portis had an MFA from the University of Chicago (1989), and a BFA from Queen's University, Canada (1984). He received his MA from Bard College Center for Curatorial Studies (2001) having undertaken his summer internship with the Bronx Museum of Art. He wrote extensively on art for publications including Parachute, Canadian Art, and Momus. From 2010 to 2013 he was curator of the MacLaren Art Centre in Barrie, Ontario, curating exhibitions of the work of Denyse Thomasos, Gordon Monahan, and others. From 2002 to 2009 Portis was assistant curator of contemporary art at the Art Gallery of Ontario, where he worked on numerous exhibitions including those by Harun Farocki, Eddo Stern, and Christo and Jeanne-Claude. In 2008 he collaborated with the Images Festival to bring the work of Charles Atlas to Toronto. After completing his MA in New York he worked with Lynne Cooke at the Dia Art Center. Before undertaking his MA, Portis founded the annual No Music Festival at the artist-run Forest City Gallery (co-founded by Greg Curnoe) in London, Ontario. The No Music Festival featured the work of Curnoe's group, the Nihilist Spasm Band, and released CD box sets of recordings. He died in a road accident in 2017.

== Selected curated exhibitions ==
- "Kent Monkman: The Triumph of Mischief", at the Glenbow Museum, February 13 to April 25, 2010
- "Kristan Horton: A Haptic Portrait of Groping Imaginations", at the MacLaren Art Centre, February 28 - May 26, 2013
- "Matt Bahen: Gravity's Faith", at MacLaren Art Centre, June 8 - September 1, 2013
- "Urban Jewels: Denyse Thomasos' Big Canvases", 1993 – 1999, at MacLaren Art Centre, September 12 - November 3, 2013
- "Baleful" at Pari Nadimi Gallery, February 4 - April 2, 2016
