= Stephen Livick =

Canadian photographer and printmaker (born 1945)

- Born: February 11, 1945; Allerton-Bywater, West Yorkshire
- Education: self-taught
- Known for: Canadian photographic artist and printmaker
- Spouse: Karen Johns (m. 1974)

Stephen Livick (born February 11, 1945) is an innovative photographic artist and printmaker living in London, Ontario. His career dates from 1974 as a full-time photographer. For him, the real magic began in the dark room. He mined the potential of photographic technology.

In 1974, he invented a photographic printing process that combined Laser Techniques and Gum Bichromate, wedding modern technology with historic procedure. Using his new way of printing photography, he could make images very large in size, even eight by 12 feet (perhaps a first for Canada) as in his Kolkata series. They have a distinctive, rich effect with soft, muted, mysterious colour, and have the "qualities of paintings". He used the new technique often in his photography shows, one of which was called a "dazzling breakthrough" by Maclean's magazine.

Livick also produced gelatine, silver, cyanotype and platinum prints. He is largely considered a gifted artist, with his "capacity for finding the brooding presence lurking inside objects and people...."

== Career ==
Livick was born in Allerton-Bywater, West Yorkshire, Britain but emigrated to Canada with his family in 1947. He grew up in Montreal where he attended Sir George Williams University (now Concordia University). He had no formal training in photography but found instructive ten years of work from 1963 on in commercial photographic studios in Montreal and Toronto. He began exploring photographic processes and came on the scene in the early 1970s with several public exhibitions of his work. It varied at the time from studies of people, colorfully printed, to studies of landscape.

His work was exhibited in a solo show at the London Art Gallery (now Museum London) (1971) in London, Ontario and in a second show, another solo exhibition at the same institution titled Stephen Livick: Photographs in 1975. Another solo show in 1975 was held at George Eastman House (now the George Eastman Museum, in Rochester, New York. In 1976 and 1977 he had solo shows at the David Mirvish Gallery in Toronto, the only photographer shown at Mirvish along with a host of colour field painters, and in 1977, his work was discussed in "Photography Year 1978" by the editors of Time-Life. In 1980, his show Stephen Livick; Photographic Explorations, was held at the Art Gallery of Ontario. From 1978-1981, the George Eastman Museum in Rochester, N.Y. and the David Mirvish Gallery in Toronto toured his photographic landscapes in a solo exhibition.

About 1976, influenced by Diane Arbus he began to change his photographic practise from nature and objects to people. The result was an important body of work about America in its Bicentennial year of 1977 titled "Amerika", a Portfolio of platinum prints. Later he pointed his camera at the entertainment industry in North America, and developed several series, including ones he titled "Middle America" (1981) and "Joints" (1982). For the Middle America series, he travelled from Timmins, Ontario to the Carolinas in the United States, but unlike the freaks of Arbus, he photographed ordinary people at fairs, festivals and amusement parks to create a kind of consensual portraiture — a collaboration between photographer and subject.

In 1984, he began travelling to India to document and photograph rituals, festivals and citizens using a large format view camera. One of the group of works he called the "Calcutta Series" consists of very large prints (ten feet in length) which focus on religion in Kolkata. He made nine trips to India between 1984 and the early 1990s. In 1993, he had a highly praised solo show with a catalogue titled Calcutta (now Kolkata) at the Canadian Museum of Contemporary Photography (now part of the National Gallery of Canada), Ottawa.

In the 1990s, India continued to absorb him. In 1990, produced a series he called "Portrait of a Country Fair" shown the Sarnia Art Gallery in Ontario (now the Judith and Norman Alix art gallery). In 1993, he developed a "Mural" series of photographs of murals which he found there. The McIntosh Gallery, Western University in London, Ontario correctly titled its retrospective of his work Stephen Livick: Metaphorical Transformations (1996) to express the transformations made by a photographer in recording subjects, in Livick's case, India. The catalogue had 24 color plates of work from the artist and three essays on his work in English, French, Bengali, and Japanese since the exhibition travelled to Yokohama, Japan. In 2017, a show Stephen Livick: Midway, going back to his work in the early 1980s, was held at the Woodstock Art Gallery, guest curated by Matthew Ryan Smith.

Livick's work was included in numerous group shows in Canada and abroad since the 1970s such as Invisible Light at the Smithsonian Institution, Washington (1979); Twelve Canadians (1981) at the Jane Corkin Gallery, Toronto; and Seeing People, Seeing Space: Contemporary Photography from Ontario, Canada held at The Photographers Gallery in London, Ontario (1994). In 2024, he was included in the Winnipeg Art Gallery's (the WAG-Qaumajuq's)'s four-person exhibition featuring work from the permanent collection Animating the Figure with Photography curated by Dr. Stephen Borys, WAG-Qaumajuq Director & CEO. His photographs in the show were all from the collection which holds his work from 1981 to 1993.

== Selected public collections ==
Livick's work has been widely collected, both in Canada and abroad in the following selected institutions:

- National Gallery of Canada, Ottawa (163 works);
- Art Gallery of Ontario, Toronto (3 works);
- The Image Centre, Toronto;
- Winnipeg Art Gallery (WAG-Qaumajuq) (40 works);
- Museum London, London, Ontario (31 works);
- McIntosh Gallery, Western University, Ontario (over 50 works);
- Art Gallery of Nova Scotia, Halifax;
- Museum of Modern Art (MoMA), New York;
- George Eastman Museum, Rochester, New York (13 works);
- Baltimore Museum of Art;
- Carnegie Museum of Art in Pittsburgh;
- Museum of Fine Arts, Boston;
- Fogg Art Museum, Boston;
