= Wayne Lum =

Canadian artist

Wayne Lum (1943–2006) was a 3-D sculptor and commercial artist. He was born in 1943 in Toronto, Ontario to first generation Chinese-Canadian grocers, Lum studied art at the Ontario College of Art and Design. He first has worked for CIII-TV and CITY-TV as an arts director, but his success was in commercial 3-D art.

His work at Toronto-based Feature Factory has graced many building in the Greater Toronto Area and beyond:

- 3-D "Movie" signage and sculptors for 48 Famous Players Theatres (Silver City and Starite) in Canada
- Ming warrior tickey machines – Grauman's Chinese Theatre – Hollywood, California
- alien ticket machines – Colossus-IMAX Theatres – Vaughan, Ontario
- Fountain of Stallions sculptor – shopping centre in Dubai
- props for Stratford Festival – Stratford, Ontario
- props for St. Lawrence Centre for the Arts – Toronto, Ontario
- props for Canadian Opera Company – Toronto, Ontario
- buddha for TV movie Bethune; now at a buddhist temple in Minden, Ontario
- prototype horse – Black Stallion TV series
- graphics arts for Disney movie Strawberry Cat
- dragon sculptor at Pacific Mall – Markham, Ontario
- sculptors for the Canadian National Exhibition – Toronto, Ontario

Unmarried, Lum died on March 6, 2006, due to complications from meningitis.
