= Cathy Daley =

Canadian visual artist and educator (1955–2022)

- Born: 24 April 1955; Toronto, Ontario, Canada
- Died: 2 March 2022 (aged 66)
- Education: Ontario College of Art (B.F.A.)
- Known for: artist
- Notable work: Little Black Dress series Power Dressing Fashion series Dance series

Catherine Marie Daley (24 April 1955 – 2 March 2022) was a Canadian visual artist and educator located in Toronto, Ontario.

== Personal life ==
Daley was born on 24 April 1955 in Toronto, Ontario. She died on 2nd March 2022, at the age of 66.

== Career ==
Daley earned a Bachelor of Fine Arts at the Ontario College of Art (OCA) (1973–74) and studied at the Art's Sake Inc (1979–80). She was an associate professor at OCAD University in the Faculty of Art, where she began teaching drawing and painting in 1988.

Many of Daley's significant artworks are included in her Little Black Dress series (2001), Power Dressing Fashion series (2003), and Dance series (2009). Her works have been exhibited in Canada and internationally since 1980, in galleries such as the Project Gallery, the Museum of Contemporary Canadian Art, The Power Plant, the Southern Alberta Gallery, the Museum Dhondt Dhaenens, and Mercer Union.

=== Style and technique ===
Daley's work investigates childhood memories and explores how women are represented through image and language in modern Western culture. Her artwork draws inspiration from this imagery and her resulting drawings are almost exclusively black pastel and charcoal on translucent vellum that reveal "disembodied gowns, tutus and billowy party frocks..."

=== Collections ===
- National Gallery of Canada, Ottawa, Ontario
- Canada Council Art Bank, Ottawa, Ontario
- The Art Gallery of Ontario, Toronto, Ontario
- Tom Thomson Art Gallery, Owen Sound, Ontario

=== Bibliography ===
- Feinstein, Roni. 1996. "Cathy Daley at Paul Petro." Art in America 84 (February): 99-100. ISSN 0004-3214.
- Osborne, Catherine. 1996. "Cathy Daley." Parachute no. 84 (Oct-Nov): 69-70. ISSN 0318-7020
- Enright, Robert. 1999. "A Sense of an Ending: Dress Me Up, Dress Me Down," Border Crossing no. 69 (Spring): 19(1):4-5.
