= Jan Wade (artist) =

Canadian artist

- Born: 1952 (age 73–74); Hamilton, Ontario, Canada
- Education: Ontario College of Art and Design
- Known for: mixed-media assemblage, painting, sculpture and textiles
- Notable work: Blood in the Soil, 2022
- Awards: VIVA Award, Jack and Doris Shadbolt Foundation for the Visual Arts, 2022

Jan Wade (born 1952) is a Canadian artist known for her work in mixed-media assemblage, painting, sculpture and textiles. Wade draws inspiration from her personal history as a Black Canadian woman with a mixed cultural background. In 2022 her solo exhibition at the Vancouver Art Gallery was the first by a Black female artist in the institution's near 100-year history .

== Biography ==
Jan Wade grew up in Hamilton, Ontario, in a close-knit Black community. Her father's family was descended from formerly enslaved people who migrated from Virginia to Canada in the early 20th century, and her mother's family background is European. Wade cites her paternal grandmother and great-grandmother as formative cultural influences, as well as the local African Methodist Episcopal Church, Stewart Memorial Church, where she first encountered Black diasporic traditions such as spiritual singing, quilting and communal storytelling. Wade attended an arts-focused high school in Hamilton and went on to the Ontario College of Art and Design in Toronto, in 1972. She graduated with honours in 1976 and moved to British Columbia in 1979, first to Gibsons and eventually to Vancouver in 1983. She lived for many years in the city's Strathcona neighbourhood, holding independent shows and sales at her studio in between residencies and formally-organized exhibitions at galleries and art museums.

== Career ==
Wade's work has been the focus of solo exhibitions including Sanctified/Soul Art (McMaster Museum of Art, January 7-February 18, 2001); Epiphany (Walter Phillips Gallery, August 29-October 16, 1994); and Jan Wade: Soul Power (Vancouver Art Gallery, July 10, 2021 – March 13, 2022). Notable international group exhibitions in which she has participated include the first Johannesburg Biennale, in 1995. Wade's travels to Cuba in 1993 and 1994 have been noted as a transformative experience, where she encountered the Santeria religion as a dimension of Black diasporic culture. Wade has held artistic residencies at the Banff Centre for the Arts (1994), the Bellagio Center for the Arts and Humanities (2004) and the Elsewhere Living Museum, Greensboro, North Carolina (2015). She is represented by the Mónica Reyes Gallery in Vancouver and the Richard Saltoun Gallery in London and Rome.

== Works ==
- Blood in the Soil, 2022, collection of the Art Gallery of Ontario
- Prophecy, 1993-2020, collection of the Vancouver Art Gallery
- Epiphany, 1990-2021, private collection
- Church and State, 1990-2020, collection of Vancouver Art Gallery
- Memory Jug, 2016, Collection of Surrey Art Gallery

== Awards ==
Wade was honoured with a VIVA Award from the Jack and Doris Shadbolt Foundation for the Visual Arts in 2022.
