= Rick Switzer =

Rick Switzer (born 1944) is a sculptor born in Oshawa, Ontario.

== Life and work ==
Switzer graduated from the Ontario College of Art in 1972, majoring in Sculpture. Switzer works in bronze although his repertoire also includes works in other materials including wood. He worked in the advertising industry for nearly a decade prior to dedicating himself to sculpting on a full-time basis in the early 1980s.

== Example Works ==
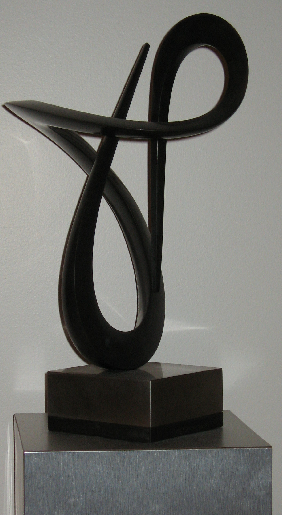
Signature In Steel (1997) by Rick Switzer.

During the 1980s, Switzer focused on creating monumental size works, including The Pod jointly commissioned by Montreal Trust and Manufacturers Life Insurance Company. Created and unveiled in 1989 as tribute to orca whales and donated to the City of Vancouver, "The Pod" is a bronze sculpture of two whales gently riding waves.

Commissioned by General Motors of Canada from 1994 through 1996, Switzer created A Tribute to Excellence, a sculpture for General Motors of Canada Supplier of the Year Award. Upon winning "A Tribute to Excellence" for three consecutive years, Bethlehem Steel commissioned Switzer to create Signature in Steel.

Rick Switzer has been a member of The Sculptors Society of Canada since 1990.
