= Denyse Thomasos =

Trinidadian-Canadian painter (1964–2012)

- Born: October 10, 1964; Port of Spain, Trinidad and Tobago
- Died: July 16, 2012 (aged 47); New York City, New York, United States
- Education: University of Toronto (BA); Yale School of Art (MFA)
- Known for: Painting
- Style: Abstract

Denyse Thomasos (October 10, 1964 – July 19, 2012) was a Trinidadian-Canadian painter known for her abstract-style wall murals that conveyed themes of slavery, confinement and the story of African and Asian Diaspora. Hybrid Nations (2005) is one of her most notable pieces that features Thomasos' signature use of dense thatchwork patterning and architectonic images to portray images of American superjails and traditional African weavework.

== Early life and education ==
Denyse Thomasos was born in Port of Spain, Trinidad and Tobago, to Jennie Ann (née Leiba) and Raymond Garth Thomasos, who attained his BS in University College of the West Indies and was a high school teacher at a boys' school. Her father's family was politically involved in Trinidad and her great-uncle was the first Black Speaker of the House of Representatives.

Thomasos and her family emigrated to Canada in 1970, settling in Toronto, Ontario, near Lawrence Avenue West and Keele Street. Her father obtained a master's degree in physics from the University of Waterloo and continued his career as a high school teacher. At the age of fifteen, Thomasos began taking drawing classes, where she especially enjoyed gesture drawing.

Thomasos received her BA in painting and art history from the University of Toronto after studying at its Mississauga campus. She was politically active at this time, participating in divestment actions and protests against apartheid, which became a major theme represented in her paintings from this period. Thomasos' father died weeks before she entered graduate school. The grief from the loss influenced her early paintings. It was at this point that her work began to shift away from representational to more abstract works, as she searched for an "emotional connection with the paint and the canvas." Thomasos received her MFA in painting and sculpture from the Yale School of Art in 1989, after attending the Skowhegan School of Painting and Sculpture in Maine, in 1988.

== Career and works ==
Thomasos was known for architectionic structures and wall paintings. Due to the partially figurative nature of her work, Thomasos' art style has been described as "semi-abstractionist" by writer Esi Edugyan and as "representational abstraction" by curator Ben Portis. Thomasos often preferred site-specific installations over standard exhibitions. Her work was, in part, inspired by travel, slavery and its psychological impact on people of color, and the prison-industrial complex. Thomasos researched and photographed super-max jail sites during the Bush years.

She was a professor at the Tyler School of Art at Temple University in Philadelphia, and Associate Professor of Art at Rutgers University's Arts, Culture and Media Department from 1995 to 2012.

In 1994, Thomasos installed a mural entitled Recollect at contemporary artist-run centre Mercer Union in Toronto, Ontario. Her painting Babylon (2005) was acquired by Carr Hall at St. Michael's College in Toronto, Ontario.

== Selected exhibitions ==
Thomasos' first solo exhibition was in 1995 at Alpha Gallery in Boston. Her other exhibitions included "Inside" (2015) at the Blackwood Gallery at the University of Toronto Mississauga; "60 Painters" (2011) at Humber Arts & Media Studios in Etobicoke, Ontario; "Formerly Exit Five: Portable Monuments to Recent History" (2010) at the University of Saskatchewan College Art Galleries in Saskatoon; "From Superjails to Super Paintings" (2010) at Olga Korper Gallery; "Swing Space: Wallworks" (2007) at the Art Gallery of Ontario; "Tracking: Bombings, Wars & Genocide: A Six Months Journey from New York to China, Vietnam, Cambodia & Indonesia" (2004) at MSVU Art Gallery in Halifax, Nova Scotia; and "Rewind" (2004) at the Art Gallery of Bishop's University in Lennoxville, Sherbrooke, Quebec.

== Selected collections ==
Thomasos' work is in the collection of the Art Gallery of Ontario among other institutions.

== Legacy ==
Olga Korper Gallery in Toronto, Ontario hosted a memorial exhibition of her work in November 2012. Another posthumous show, "Urban Jewels," was hosted in 2013 at the MacLaren Art Centre in Barrie, Ontario, curated by Ben Portis. Another memorial exhibition entitled "Denyse Thomasos: Odyssey," curated by Gaëtane Verna and Sarah Milroy, was organized in collaboration with the McMichael Canadian Art Collection at the Art Gallery of Greater Victoria from November 2021 to February 2022. In 2022, the Art Gallery of Ontario and Remai Modern organized the large retrospective exhibition Denyse Thomasos: Just Beyond with a catalogue co-edited by the exhibition curators Renée van der Avoird, Sally Frater and Michelle Jacques.

== Awards ==
Thomasos won more than twenty awards over the course of her career, including an affiliated fellowship at the American Academy in Rome in 1995 (funded by The Pew Charitable Trusts), a Guggenheim Fellowship in 1997, a Millennium Grant from the Canada Council for the Arts, and the first McMillan/Stewart award from Maryland Institute College of Art (MICA) in 2009. She was awarded fellowships from the New York Foundation of the Arts, and won residencies to Bellagio, Yaddo, and the MacDowell Colony.

== Personal life ==
In 2009, Thomasos married filmmaker Samein Priester at City Hall, New York City. The couple adopted their child, Syann, in June 2010. They were remarried at St. Basil's Church in Toronto, Ontario in July 2010 and the reception was held underneath Thomasos' monumental painting Babylon (2005) which is permanently installed in the University of Toronto's Carr Hall.

== Death ==
Thomasos died suddenly in July 2012 at age forty-seven, due to an allergic reaction to dye injected during a diagnostic medical procedure. A memorial service in her honour was held at the Basilica of St. Patrick's Old Cathedral in New York City.
