= Bobs Cogill Haworth =

South African–Canadian artist (1900–1988)

- Self portrait
- Born: Barbara Zema Warbairn Cohill; January 20, 1900; Queenstown, Cape Colony
- Died: March 30, 1988 (aged 88); Toronto, Ontario, Canada
- Other names: Zema Barbara Cogill Haworth, Barbara Zema Warbairn Vera Cohill
- Education: Royal College of Art, University of London
- Known for: Painting, Ceramics
- Movement: Abstract art
- Spouse: Peter Haworth

Barbara "Bobs" Cogill Haworth RCA (January 20, 1900 – March 30, 1988) was a South African–born Canadian painter and potter. She practiced mainly in Toronto, living and working with her husband, painter and teacher Peter Haworth. She was a member of the Canadian Group of Painters with Yvonne McKague Housser, Isabel McLaughlin and members of the Group of Seven.

== Early life and education ==
Barbara Zema Vera Cogill was born in Queenston, South Africa.

She studied at the School of Design of the Royal College of Art in London, England with Professor William Rothenstein, Dora Billington, and Eric Gill, specializing in ceramics (1919–1923). She emigrated to Toronto, Ontario, Canada in 1923.

She married Peter Haworth. The Haworths lived in the fashionable upscale district of Rosedale in Toronto. Their residence was a mecca for artists holding formal meetings and small exhibitions.

== Career and official commissions ==
From 1913 to 1968 she worked as a painter in watercolour, oils, and later in acrylic. She also used standard clay for her pottery works. The majority of her works are signed "B. Cogill Haworth" or "Bobs Cogill Haworth". Haworth preferred landscape themes and waterscape themes but also painted non-objective paintings, some on a very large scale. Most of her paintings post-1950 were created on masonite and often signed on the front and verso; often with an artist's paper label.

In 1936, Bobs Haworth was one of the founding members of the Canadian Guild of Potters along with Nunzia D'Angel and Robert Montgomery. Haworth was the first honorary president.

Both Peter and Bobs Haworth made illustrations for Kingdom of the Saguenay (1936) by Marius Barbeau. (Note: Other lllustrators of the Kingdom of the Saguenay were André Charles Biéler, Rody Kenny Courtice, A. Y. Jackson, George Pepper, Albert Edward Cloutier, Arthur Lismer, Gordon Edward Pfeiffer, Yvonne McKague Housser and Kathleen Daly.) The Haworths also collaborated on illustrating James Edward Le Rossignol's The Habitant Merchant (1939).

She was elected a full member of the Royal Canadian Academy of Arts in 1963.

== Exhibitions ==
Haworth was a regular and prolific exhibitor with such institutions as the Royal Canadian Academy of Arts (RCA), Ontario Society of Artists (OSA), Canadian Society of Painters in Water Colour (CSPWC), Canadian Group of Painters (CGP) among other formal and informal art groups and organizations.

== Death and legacy ==
Haworth died peacefully at her home in Toronto. At her bequest, she left her entire art archives and remainder of her art works to Queen's University. In 1998, she was one of the four artists in 4 Women Who Painted in the 1930s and 1940s, curated by Alicia Boutilier for the Carleton University Art Gallery, Ottawa. Her work was included in The Artist Herself: Self-Portraits by Canadian Historical Artists , an exhibition co-curated by Alicia Boutilier and Tobi Bruce who also co-edited the book/catalogue.

== Bibliography ==
- Boutilier, Alicia (1998). 4 Women Who Painted in the 1930s and 1940s. Ottawa: Carleton University Art Gallery.
- Boyanoski, Christine (19 December 2013). "Haworth, Zema Barbara Cogill (1900-1988)". North American Women Artists of the Twentieth Century: A Biographical Dictionary. Taylor & Francis. ISBN 978-1-135-63889-4.
- Crawford, Gail (1998). A Fine Line: Studio Crafts in Ontario from 1930 to the Present. Dundurn. ISBN 978-1-55002-303-9.
- University of British Columbia. Library (1973). A Checklist of Printed Materials Relating to French-Canadian Literature, 1763–1968. UBC Press. ISBN 978-0-7748-0007-5.
