= Peter Haworth =

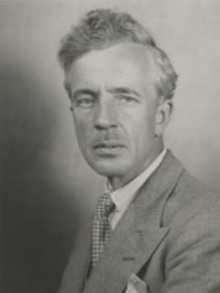
- Born: 1889; Oswaldtwistle, Lancashire, England
- Died: 7 May 1986 (aged 96–97); Toronto, Ontario, Canada
- Occupation: Painter
- Known for: Stained glass
- Spouse: Barbara Coghill

Peter Haworth DFC RCA (1889 – 7 May 1986) was a British-born Canadian painter. He was known for his stained glass work.

== Early years ==
Peter Haworth was born in 1889 in Oswaldtwistle, Lancashire, England. During World War I (1914–1918) he served in the Royal Flying Corps and won the Distinguished Flying Cross. After the war he studied at the Royal College of Art in London under William Rothenstein and Robert Anning Bell. He specialized in stained glass at an early stage in his career. Haworth married Zema Barbara Cogill (1900–1988), a painter from South Africa who also studied at the Royal College of Art under Rothenstein. She used the name Bobs Cogill Haworth.

== Pre-war Canada ==
In 1923 the Haworths immigrated to Canada, where Peter was appointed Director of Art at the Central Technical School in Toronto. Bobs Haworth taught ceramics at the Central Technical School from 1929 to 1963. Peter Haworth accepted Doris McCarthy for a teaching job at the school late in 1931 on the basis of a portfolio of her work. She says of him in her autobiography, "Peter Haworth was a young, good-looking, curly-headed autocrat, who was gradually transforming a mediocre secondary-school art department into a dynamic powerhouse. Instead of hiring teachers who had taken summer courses in art, he hired artists and hoped they could teach." He gave the artists very little guidance, expecting them to work out how to do the job.

While teaching Peter Haworth also accepted commissions to undertake stained glass work. These included fourteen panels for the First Baptist Church, Ottawa, which drew favorable attention to his work in 1929. In 1931 he exhibited a painting Outhouses with the Canadian Society of Painters in Water Colour. The National Gallery of Canada bought this painting in 1932. He was elected president of the Canadian Society of Painters in Water Colour by 1936. Haworth was also a member of the Ontario Society of Artists. Both Peter and Bobs Haworth made illustrations for Kingdom of the Saguenay (1936) by Marius Barbeau. (Note: Other lllustrators of the Kingdom of the Saguenay were André Charles Biéler, Rody Kenny Courtice, A. Y. Jackson, George Pepper, Albert Edward Cloutier, Arthur Lismer, Gordon Edward Pfeiffer, Yvonne McKague Housser and Kathleen Daly.) In 1938 three of his watercolors were exhibited at the Tate in London in the show A Century of Canadian Art. The Haworths also collaborated on illustrating James Edward Le Rossignol's The Habitant Merchant (1939).

== World War II and after ==
Haworth kept his teaching job at the Central Technical School during and after World War II (1939–1945). Peter Haworth was also employed by the University of Toronto as an instructor in Design and Drawing in 1939. From 1943 to 1956 Bobs taught at the University of Toronto in the fine arts department, while still teaching at the Central Technical School. After the outbreak of war the Hawarths were both commissioned by the Canadian government to record the activities of the armed forces on the coast of British Columbia.

In the period before World War II the Haworths would take the train from Toronto to make long visits in the summer to the region of Baie-Saint-Paul and Saint-Urbain in Quebec, as did many other Canadian and American artists. Haworth and his wife Bobs would stay at Cap-à-l'Aigle during their painting trips. On one such trip, just after the war, Doris McCarthy and three friends shared the same pension and painted with the Haworths, the start of an important friendship.

Haworth was still primarily a stained glass artist in the 1950s. He held a one-man show in 1959 at the Roberts Gallery in Toronto. Another show of his semi-abstract paintings was given at the Roberts Gallery in 1961. After his retirement from teaching he continued to paint in Toronto until his death in 1986 at the age of 97. He died in Toronto.

== Reception ==
The Vancouver Art Gallery showed thirty nine of the Haworths' wartime works. A review in the Vancouver Province in January 1944 said,

Mindful of the picturesque and strong nature of the western landscape, and introducing even typical local touches such as totem poles, the artists have vigorously portrayed a region guarded by planes, guns and ships ... Emphasis has been laid in the sketches on the role of aviation. Numerous pictures of airplanes, seen close up or at a distance, and singly or in squadrons, are invariably shown with verve and in skilful patterns. The human element of ground crews is likewise frequently introduced.

The Canadian sculptor Elizabeth Wyn Wood gave a speech on "Handicrafts in Relation to Community Art Centres in Canada". at the National Arts Club in New York City on 21 March 1945 that was reproduced in part in the summer issue of Canadian Art. She noted the important role of the Canadian Guild of Potters, and of ceramic educators such as the Haworths at the Central Technical School. Melwyn Breen of the Toronto Saturday Night wrote in 1952,

We found Mr. Haworth in his study surrounded by the tools and materials of his work: samples of stained glass, stack of exquisite, jewel-like and meticulously painted sketches, huge 'cartoons', which are the blueprints for a finished window . . . . For the steps in the designs he has done for many churches in Toronto, Montreal, Ottawa, Hamilton and elsewhere, Haworth and his assistant Miss Gladys Allen, first make a water-color or tempera sketch of the finished window. These 'sketches' are beautiful things in themselves having the glow and richness of miniature windows. The sketch is then redrawn in charcoal to actual scale as a 'cartoon'. The cartoon is then taken to the firm that does the actual glass-making and assembling, and, under Haworth's supervision, the glass sections in the design are keyed to show the color and shape of the piece of glass to be used...

Hugh Thomson of the Toronto Daily Star wrote of his 1959 show at the Robert Gallery,

There is no attempt at bold flourish and the bravura manner. His is more the reflective, minor-key style of nature-painting. He loves an arresting pattern of lines, such as a dock with interesting stages to it and stairs leading to the various landings, a herring weir, the formation of roots, a grouping of flora, a kaleidoscopic pattern of variously tinted autumn leaves floating on water.
