= Isabel McLaughlin =

Canadian artist (1903–2002)

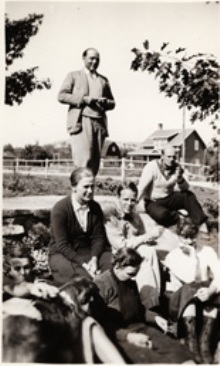
- Randolph Hewton, Isabel McLaughlin, Gordon Webber, Audrey Taylor, Prudence Heward and Rody Kenny Courtice c. 1935
- Born: Isabel Grace McLaughlin; October 10, 1903; Oshawa, Ontario, Canada
- Died: November 26, 2002 (aged 99)
- Education: Ontario College of Art (1925–1927); Art Students' League, Toronto (1928); Scandinavian Academy, Paris (1929)
- Awards: CM (1997); OOnt (1993)

Isabel McLaughlin, CM OOnt (10 October 1903 – 26 November 2002) was a modernist Canadian painter, patron and philanthropist. She specialized in landscapes and still life and had a strong interest in design.

== Biography ==
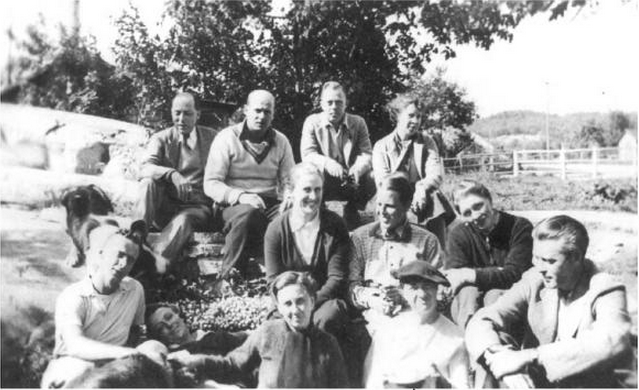
Whitefish Falls in 1936. Top row: Randolph Hewton, Mr. Whittall, Charles Comfort, Yvonne McKague Housser. Middle row: Isabel McLaughlin, Gordon Webber, Bennie Hewton. Bottom row: Hal Hayden, Audrey Taylor, Prudence Heward, Rody Kenny Courtice, Mr. Macdonald.

Born in Oshawa, Ontario, McLaughlin was the third of five daughters to Adelaide Mowbray McLaughlin and founder of the McLaughlin Motor Car Company and first president of General Motors Canada, Col. Robert Samuel McLaughlin. She studied watercolour painting with Louise Saint in Paris while learning French at the Sorbonne in Paris (1921–1924).

From 1925 to 1927, she studied art at the Ontario College of Art with Group of Seven member Arthur Lismer and Yvonne McKague Housser, the latter of whom she referred to as "remarkable". She then attended the Art Students' League, as it was called, a school started by Lismer's students on the grounds of the College of Art with, as mentors, Lismer and Housser. Lawren Harris, A. Y. Jackson, Bertram Brooker, Lowrie Warrener, Frances Loring and Florence Wyle, came and besides advice, expressed enthusiasm. In 1929, she studied in Paris at the Scandinavian Academy with Prudence Heward, with whom she formed a lifelong friendship, then in Vienna with Housser in 1930. (Her artistic pursuits are described in the 1994 NFB film on the Beaver Hall group, "By Woman's Hand").

McLaughlin was recognized as a dedicated artist from early in her career. As Fred Housser wrote in 1929, McLaughlin was "one of the boldest young women painters we have...Her compositions are intensely modern in feeling...characterized by...real power", together with originality of expression...." She was an invited participant in the Group of Seven exhibition in 1931. Her first solo show was at the Art Gallery of Toronto in 1933. Her early work is described as having a sculptural simplicity of style. She exhibited at Scott & Sons, Montreal with Sarah Robertson, and Heward (1934); at Malloney Galleries, Toronto, with Rody Kenny Courtice, Kathleen Daly, Housser and Paraskeva Clark (1936); and the Picture Loan Society, Toronto (1937). Besides Heward, she formed a strong friendship with Housser and the two often went on painting excursions together and exhibited their work at Canadian Group of Painters shows, of which both were founding members in 1933.

Tree by McLaughlin, now in the collection of the National Gallery of Canada, was lampooned in the Toronto Telegram following its exhibition in a 1936 Canadian Group of Painters show. In 1940, she showed in a four-person exhibition at the Art Gallery of Toronto with Courtice, Bobs Coghill Haworth, and Housser (this exhibition was re-examined in 1998 as a show curated by Alicia Boutilier with a catalogue by the Art Gallery of Carleton University in Ottawa titled 4 Women Who Painted in the 1930s and 1940s). In the summers of 1938 and 1939, she studied Dynamic Symmetry with Emile Bistram in Taos, New Mexico. During the summers from 1947 to 1952, McLaughlin studied with Hans Hofmann accompanied by Alexandra Luke with whom she also was a close friend.

== Selected public collections ==
McLaughlin's works are in many public collections such as the National Gallery of Canada, the Robert McLaughlin Gallery in Oshawa, the McMichael Canadian Art Collection, Kleinburg and the Art Gallery of Guelph, Ontario.

== Commissions ==
Among McLaughlin's public commissions was a mural for the children's reading room of the Oshawa Public Library in 1955.

== Memberships ==
McLaughlin served as the first woman president of the Canadian Group of Painters (1939–1945). McLaughlin was also a member of the Ontario Society of Artists, as well as an executive member of the Heliconian Club in Toronto and its President (1940–1942). She was also a member of the Federation of Canadian Artists (1942).

== Honours ==
McLaughlin was the recipient of the Order of Ontario in 1993 and the Order of Canada in 1997.

== Record sale prices ==
In the spring 2022 sale of auction Cowley Abbott, McLaughlin's Backyards, lot 74, oil on canvas, 25 x 26 ins ( 63.5 x 66 cms ), estimated at $15,000.00 - $20,000.00, realized a price of $40,800.00.

== Gifts to Oshawa and elsewhere ==
McLaughlin gave financial gifts to the Art Gallery of Ontario, the Art Gallery of Windsor, the Art Gallery of Guelph, the Heliconian Club and the Robert McLaughlin Gallery. In 1987, McLaughlin made a donation of art work from her personal collection of art works by other artists than herself to the Robert McLaughlin Gallery as well. Some of these artists included Gerhard Richter, Prudence Heward, Louis Archambault, B. C. Binning, André Charles Biéler, Emil Bisttram, Emily Carr, Paraskeva Clark, Lyonel Feininger, Lawren Harris, A. Y. Jackson, Alexandra Luke, Peter Haworth, Bobs Cogill Haworth, Hans Hofmann, J. E. H. MacDonald, Anne Savage, Arthur Lismer, and Sarah Robertson among others. A second donation followed in 1990 which included many works by Jackson, Lismer and Housser.

Before her death, she gave her archives to Queen's University. Following her death, McLaughlin's remaining collection of art work was donated to the Robert McLaughlin Gallery. Isabel McLaughlin (1903–2002): Painter, Patron, Philanthropist was held at the Agnes Etherington Art Centre in Kingston, Ontario, in 2007, to celebrate the gift to the archives at Queen's University at Kingston.

McLaughlin lived to be 99, dying in 2002.

== Legacy ==
In 1948, Housser painted a watercolour depicting McLaughlin titled Isabel the Archaeologist, Cap Chat River. McLaughlin also was the subject of an authorized portrait relief sculpture by Florence Wyle. A mid-life portrait photograph was authorized by Reva Brooks in the 1950s.

In 1998, McLaughlin was one of the four artists in 4 Women Who Painted in the 1930s and 1940s, curated by Alicia Boutilier for the Carleton University Art Gallery, Ottawa. In 2013, her role in supporting the Canadian Group of Painters was discussed in A Vital Force: Canadian Group of Painters curated by Boutilier for the Agnes Etherington Art Centre. In 2016, the Art Gallery of Guelph included her work in the exhibition Dear Life, which traced the ways in which women have shaped the course of art across the 20th, and now the 21st, centuries.
