= Albert Edward Cloutier =

Canadian painter and graphic designer

- Born: 1902; Leominster, Massachusetts, US
- Died: 1965 (aged 62–63); Mont-Saint-Hilaire, Quebec, Canada
- Occupation: Painter

Albert Edward Cloutier (1902–1965) was a Canadian painter and graphic designer who painted in a form of intensified realism with abstract plastic forms.

== Life ==
Albert Edward Cloutier was born in 1902 of Canadian parents in Leominster, Massachusetts, USA. The family moved back to Canada 1903. As a child he was encouraged to paint by his parents. He was mostly self-taught. He went on painting trips with A. Y. Jackson and Edwin Holgate. Cloutier was an apprentice with Smeaton Bros in Montreal in 1918–21. He worked with Associated Engravers in Montreal (1922–25) and with Batten Ltd. in Montreal (1926–29). From 1929 to 1940 he was a freelance graphic designer and illustrator in Montreal. He was part of the "Oxford Group" led by the painters André Biéler and Edwin Holgate, which met in a below-ground room at the Oxford tavern at lunchtime. The group had roughly equal numbers of francophone and anglophone members. Other members were Adrien Hébert, the art critic Jean Chauvin and the editor Carrier.

Cloutier and Edwin Holgate made a mural for the Canadian pavilion at the 1939 New York World's Fair, commissioned by the Canadian government. It showed a panorama of the country in terms of industries, people and products. The focus of the mural was a hydroelectric dam with a white horse in front of it, representing power. Transmission lines lead from the dam to pulp and paper, mining and manufacturing industries. A man with a horse and plough in the foreground represented traditional agriculture. During World War II (1939–1945) Cloutier was Art Director for the Wartime Information Board in 1941. In 1941 Cloutier and Eric Aldwinckle made a poster of Canada's New Army. The work follows the current style with clean lines and a simple, efficient design. Cloutier was an Official Second World War artist with the Royal Canadian Air Force from 1943 to 1946. He was the only francophone war artist. His pictures included training aircraft and flying boats.

Cloutier made silkscreens for Sampson Matthews Limited. He was a freelance graphic designer and illustrator in Ottawa (1946–48) and then back in Montreal from 1948 onward. He lectured at the École des beaux-arts de Montréal for more than two years. Cloutier was among the artists selected to decorate the interior of the Queen Elizabeth Hotel, owned by the Canadian National Railway, which opened in 1958. Others were Jean Dallaire (wall hanging), Marius Plamondon (stained glass mural), Claude Vermette (ceramic tiles) and Julien Hébert (bronze elevator doors). Cloutier contributed carved wooden panels. He painted a mural for the main dining room of the Salle Bonaventure in the hotel.

Albert Cloutier died in Mont-Saint-Hilaire, Quebec, in 1965. He was aged 63.

== Work ==
Cloutier worked in oils, water colors, tempera, clay, wood and metals. His paintings mainly depict the beauty of Canadian landscapes. His early paintings showed the influence of the French Impressionists, the Group of Seven and Paul Cézanne. His later work was an intensified realism, with increasingly abstract and plastic forms. Cloutier followed the French Canadian tradition of showing settled farm landscapes and avoided modernism. Selected commissions include:

- 450 square feet (42 m^{2}) frieze in collaboration with Edwin Holgate for the Canadian pavilion at the 1939 New York World's Fair
- Mural for one of the new Park cars on the Canadian Pacific Railway's Canadian passenger train
- Twelve panels for the Salle Bonaventure in the Queen Elizabeth Hotel, Montreal
- Mural for Le Carignan restaurant at Place Ville Marie in Montreal
- Painting of soldiers from the Carignan-Salières Regiment in full battle-dress in dyes on fabric

Cloutier made some of the illustrations for Kingdom of the Saguenay (1936) by Marius Barbeau. (Note: Other lllustrators of the Kingdom of the Saguenay were Rody Kenny Courtice, A. Y. Jackson, George Pepper, Peter Haworth, Bobs Cogill Haworth, André Charles Biéler, Arthur Lismer, Gordon Edward Pfeiffer, Yvonne McKague Housser and Kathleen Daly.) He designed and illustrated Pathway to Greatness (1959) for the Canadian Pulp & Paper Association. The book described how the Saint Lawrence River was developed into the Saint Lawrence Seaway.

== Affiliations and collections ==
Cloutier became a member of the Federation of Canadian Artists in 1941 and the Canadian Society of Painters in Water Colour in 1948. He became an associate of the Royal Canadian Academy of Arts in 1951 and a member of the Academy in 1956. He became a member of Arts Club, Montreal in 1951, and was president of the Arts Club in 1957–59. He became a member of the Canadian Society of Graphic Art (c. 1952); president of the Art Directors' Club of Montreal (1953); a member of the National Society of Art Directors in New York City. His work was exhibited at the Klinkhoff Gallery and Arts Club in Montreal. His work is held by the National Gallery of Canada in Ottawa.

== Sources ==
- Belton, Robert James (2001). Sights of Resistance: Approaches to Canadian Visual Culture. University of Calgary Press. ISBN 978-1-55238-011-6.
- Granatstein, J. L. (2005). The Last Good War: An Illustrated History of Canada in the Second World War, 1939–1945. Douglas & McIntyre. p. 47. ISBN 978-1-55054-913-3.
- Kobayashi, Audrey (2013-09-13). Geographies of Peace and Armed Conflict. Taylor & Francis. ISBN 978-1-135-75647-5.
- Lerner, Loren R.; Williamson, Mary F. (1991-01-01). Art and Architecture in Canada: A Bibliography and Guide to the Literature. University of Toronto Press. ISBN 978-0-8020-5856-0.
- MacDonald, Colin S. (2006). "CLOUTIER, Albert Edward". A Dictionary of Canadian Artists. National Gallery of Canada / Musée des beaux-arts du Canada.
- McKay, Marylin J. (2011-04-12). Picturing the Land: Narrating Territories in Canadian Landscape Art, 1500–1950. McGill-Queen's Press – MQUP. ISBN 978-0-7735-3817-7.
- Smith, Frances K.; Baylaucq, Philippe (2006). André Biéler: un artiste et son époque. Presses Université Laval. ISBN 978-2-7637-7886-0.
- "The 50th Anniversary of the CPR Stainless Steel Passenger Fleet" (PDF). Canadian Rail (503). November–December 2004. Archived from the original (PDF) on 2015-09-24.
- University of British Columbia. Library (1973). A Checklist of Printed Materials Relating to French-Canadian Literature, 1763–1968. UBC Press. ISBN 978-0-7748-0007-5.
