= Rody Kenny Courtice =

Canadian artist (1891–1973)

- Born: Roselyn Margaret Kenny; 1891; Renfrew, Ontario, Canada
- Died: 1973 (aged 81–82)
- Other name: Rody Kenny Hammond
- Occupation: Painter
- Spouse(s): Henry Lloyd Hammond (d. 1918); Andrew Roy Courtice

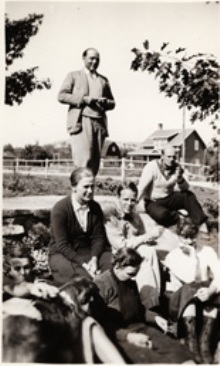
Randolph Hewton, Isabel McLaughlin, Gordon Webber, Audrey Taylor, Prudence Heward and Rody Kenny Courtice, around 1935

Rody Kenny Courtice (born Roselyn Margaret Kenny; 1891–1973) was a modernist Canadian painter. She was associated with the Group of Seven early in her career, but later developed a more individual style. She was active in associations of artists and worked for the professionalization of their occupation. She also was an educator.

== Life ==
Roselyn Margaret Kenny was born in Renfrew, Ontario, in 1891. (Note: Courtice would say she was born in 1895, but she was in fact born in 1891.) She was one of the first women to be admitted to the Ontario College of Art to study with Arthur Lismer. She won a scholarship each year from 1920 to 1924.

Courtice was a librarian at the Ontario College of Art from 1925 to 1926, and for ten years, was assistant instructor for children's classes with Lismer. She also studied puppets and stagecraft under Tony Sarg at the Art Institute of Chicago in 1927, and continued to study these subjects in New York, London and Paris. She was assistant instructor to John William Beatty at the Port Hope Summer School. She taught at the Doon School of Art. She and John Alford taught the teachers' summer course. In 1950, Courtice studied at Hans Hofmann's summer school in Provincetown, Massachusetts.

Courtice was first married to Henry Lloyd Hammond, a lieutenant in the Royal Air Force who was killed in action on 4 August 1918. Her second marriage was to Andrew Roy Courtice. She died in 1973.

== Work ==
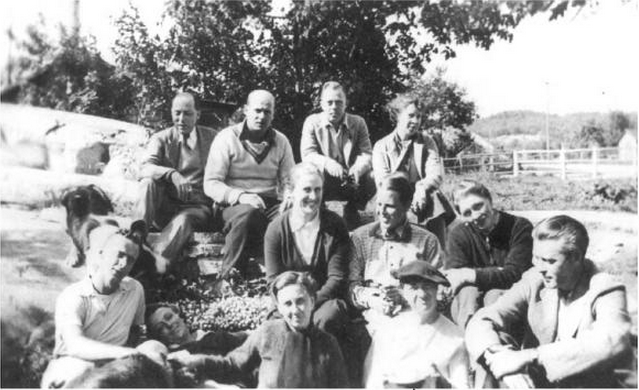
Whitefish Falls in 1936. Top row: Randolph Hewton, Mr. Whittall, Charles Comfort, Yvonne McKague Housser. Middle row: Isabel McLaughlin, Gordon Webber, Bennie Hewton. Bottom row: Hal Hayden, Audrey Taylor, Prudence Heward, Rody Kenny Courtice, Mr. Macdonald.

Courtice was one of the first women to participate in the Canadian modernist movement. She was invited to exhibit with the Group of Seven. Courtice made many landscapes in a similar style to the members of the Group of Seven. She was not always serious about this. Yvonne McKague Housser remembers going with Courtice on a sketching trip in the north where they could not find any scenery that interested them. Courtice assembled a tree trunk, branches and rocks into a still life, which she called "a Lawren Harris". The two women each painted it as though it were a panoramic landscape, and described it as a landscape when they sold their paintings.

Later Courtice moved away from the Group of Seven, and exhibited solo or with other women artists. She became a member of the Canadian Group of Painters, which was founded in 1933. Courtice contributed illustrations to The Kingdom of Saguenay (1936) by Marius Barbeau, as did A. Y. Jackson, George Pepper, Kathleen Daly, Peter Haworth, Bobs Cogill Haworth, André Charles Biéler, Arthur Lismer, Gordon Edward Pfeiffer, Yvonne McKague and Albert Edward Cloutier.

She accompanied Housser and Isabel McLaughlin on trips to locations such as Cobalt, Gowganda, Nipissing and Kirkland Lake in the 1930s, where they painted industrial subjects. Her work could have a political content. The Game (c. 1949) depicts war as a game in a toy theatre, with black, white and red chess pieces on a board decorated with a hammer and sickle.

Courtice exhibited at the Tate Gallery, London, in Brazil, in New York at the World's Fair of 1939, at the Riverside Museum and at the American-British Gallery, New York. She had a solo show at Victoria College, Toronto in 1951. Her retrospective curated by Linda Jansma was held at the Robert McLaughlin Gallery in Oshawa in 2006.

A review of the work by the Canadian Group of Painters at the 1939 World's Fair said:

"These ... are vital and young and imaginative ... Some of the artists are rather more expressionistic ... still others are more interested in highly inventive sophisticated pattern, among them Rody Kenny Courtice with his [sic] Just Cows, or in near-primitive fantasy, like Paraskeva Clark."

== Associations ==
Courtice was an associate member of the Royal Canadian Academy of Arts, and belonged to the Ontario Society of Artists, the Canadian Society of Painters in Water Colour and the Canadian Society of Graphic Art. She became an executive member of the Heliconian Club. She was president of the Ontario branch of the Federation of Canadian Artists from 1945 to 1946. The Federation was a lobbying organization founded after the Kingston Conference of Canadian Artists in 1941. Courtice, women artists such as Yvonne McKague Housser and Elizabeth Wyn Wood, and their male colleagues, worked towards gaining increasing public support for the arts, leading to state sponsorship of professional artists.

== Legacy ==
In 1998, Courtice was one of the four artists in 4 Women Who Painted in the 1930s and 1940s, curated by Alicia Boutilier for the Carleton University Art Gallery, Ottawa.
