= Canadian Guild of Potters =

Canadian non-profit organization

- Successor: Ceramic Masters Canada
- Formation: 20 March 1936
- Dissolved: c. 1975
- Type: Crafts association
- Legal status: Non-profit organization
- Headquarters: Toronto
- Region served: Canada
- Members: Canadian ceramic artists
- Official language: English, French

The Canadian Guild of Potters was a non-profit organization of Canadian ceramic artists that was active from 1936 to 1978.

== Foundation ==
The founding members of the Canadian Guild of Potters were Nunzia D'Angelo, Robert Montgomery and Bobs Cogill Haworth. Howarth was the first honorary president, Montgomery was chairman and Molly Satterly was secretary. Although representing itself as a national organization, most of the early members were based in Toronto. The Guild held its first meeting on 20 March 1936. Mary Dignam's representative invited them to become an affiliate of the Women's Art Association of Canada (WAAC) and to hold their meetings in the WAAC building at 23 Prince Arthur Avenue in Toronto. Shortly after being founded, in 1936 the Canadian Guild of Potters decided to join the Canadian Handicrafts Guild, based in Montreal.

== Activities ==
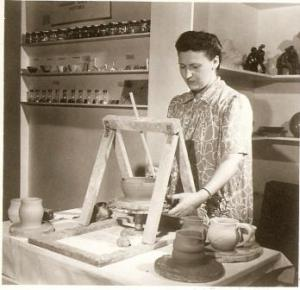
Bailey Leslie at the Wheel - First Demonstration by the Canadian Guild of Potters at Eaton's College Street Store, Toronto 1940

In the early years most of the members were amateurs and quality was a concern. In 1943 Pearl McCarthy wrote in The Globe and Mail, "If this art craft is to advance in quality and number of workers it will need the kind of new member who is willing to take both chemistry and art seriously." Outside Quebec, this amateur image was an ongoing problem, although professionalism grew steadily over the years. Nunzia D'Angelo made great efforts to ensure that members could exhibit on the Ceramic National exhibitions organized by the New York State College of Ceramics.

The Canadian sculptor Elizabeth Wyn Wood gave a speech on "Handicrafts in Relation to Community Art Centres in Canada". at the National Arts Club in New York City on 21 March 1945 that was reproduced in part in the summer issue of Canadian Art. She noted the important role of the Canadian Guild of Potters, and of ceramic educators such as Peter Haworth and Bobs Cogill Haworth at the Central Technical School in Toronto.

An exhibition was held in the Art Gallery of Toronto in March–April 1950 for the 50th anniversary of the gallery. All the visual art schools, styles and media were represented. The Canadian Guild of Potters was among the eight art societies that contributed to the show. The guild held exhibitions of Canadian Ceramics / Céramiques canadiennes in Montreal and Toronto every two years from 1955 to 1971. Ceramics selected from the second national Canadian Guild of Potters exhibition in 1957 were selected by jury for the Canadian Fine Crafts show that year, the first national juried crafts show in Canada. The Guild sent three representatives to the First World Congress of Craftsmen, held on 8–19 June 1964 at Columbia University.

The Guild eventually lost momentum, and was replaced around 1975 by an organization named Ceramic Masters Canada, later renamed Ceramists Canada.

== Members ==
Noted members of the Guild included Florence Wyle (1881-1968), Bobs Cogill Haworth (1900-1988) and Eileen Hazell (1903-1984).
