= Eileen Hazell =

Canadian artist (1903–1984)

- Born: 1903; Surrey, United Kingdom
- Died: 1984 (aged 80–81); Toronto, Ontario, Canada
- Known for: Potter
- Spouse: S. G. Hazell

Eileen Hazell (born 1903) was a Canadian sculptor and potter featured in the 1958 film "Craftsmen of Canada".

== Biography ==
Hazell was born in Surrey, England in 1903 in Surrey, England, emigrating to Canada in 1928. She studied at Central Technical School in Toronto.

Hazell is best known for her work as a ceramicist. She exhibited widely internationally and in Canada at the Canadian Handicrafts Guild (annually at Montreal and Toronto); the Ontario Society of Artists (1959 to 1962); Expo '67 at the Canadian Pavilion, and elsewhere. She was the recipient of several awards, among them the CHG Canadian Design Award, the CHG Contemporary Design Award, and the Diploma and Honneur at the Exposition de La Céramique Contemporaine. Hazell was a member of the Canadian Handicrafts Guild (CHG) (1950), the Canadian Guild of Potters (1960-Director) and the American Craftsmen's Council (c. 1947). Among the public collections which include her work is the Musée national des beaux-arts du Québec and The Department of External Affairs (Canadian Embassy in Washington).

Hazell died in 1984 in Toronto.
