= Kathleen Daly =

Canadian artist

Kathleen Frances Daly
- Born: 28 May 1898; Napanee, Ontario, Canada
- Died: 31 August 1994 (aged 96); Toronto, Ontario, Canada
- Education: OCAD University; Académie de la Grande Chaumière; Parsons School of Design
- Occupation: Painter
- Known for: Depictions of First Nations people
- Spouse: George Pepper (m. 1929; died 1962)

Kathleen Frances Daly (or Kathleen Daly Pepper) RCA (28 May 1898 – 31 August 1994) was a Canadian painter. She is known for her depictions of First Nations and the Inuit in Canada.

== Life ==
Kathleen Frances Daly was born in Napanee, Ontario. She came from a distinguished family. (Note: Kathleen's brother, Richard Arthur Daly, became a wealthy businessman, president of a Toronto-based securities firm. In 1927, he joined the council of the Art Gallery of Toronto. Her sister-in-law Katherine Daly and her two sons were the subject of a group portrait by Frederick Varley.) Her parents were Denis Daly and Mary (Bennett) Daly. She attended Havergal College, Toronto, a girls boarding school. She was admitted to the University of Toronto in 1920.

She studied at the Ontario College of Art, Toronto (1920–1924), where her instructors included John William Beatty, George Agnew Reid, Arthur Lismer and J. E. H. MacDonald. She went to the Académie de la Grande Chaumière, Paris (1924–1925), took private lessons in wood engraving from René Pottier in Paris, and studied at the Parsons School of Design, New York (1926). Between 1924 and 1930, she made a sketching trip to Europe each year. She visited the Basque Country, Italy, and France.

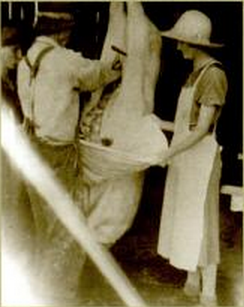
Butchering the swine, Saint-Urbain, Charlevoix county, in the 1930s, photograph by Katherine Daly Pepper

Kathleen Daly met George Pepper (1903–1962) while they were both studying at the Académie de la Grande Chaumière in Paris. They married in 1929 and moved to Canada. At first they were based in Ottawa, Ontario. The Peppers traveled to the north shore of Lake Superior, then to Charlevoix County in the Laurentian Mountains of Quebec in 1930. In 1931, they visited Nova Scotia and the Gaspé, and in 1932 returned to Quebec. In 1932, George Pepper was made a member of the staff of the Ontario College of Art, and the Peppers moved to Toronto.

In 1933, they built a log studio in Charlevoix County, where Kathleen Daly painted French-Canadian genre scenes and landscapes. Their cabin was in the village of Saint-Urbain, where they were great friends of Alphonse and Madame l'Abbé, an extremely outgoing and hospitable family. Other artists would come to stay at the l'Abbé farmhouse.

The Peppers lived and worked at the Studio Building in Toronto from 1934 to 1951. They continued to travel widely in Canada, visiting the east and west coast and going as far north as Ellesmere Island. Kathleen painted portraits of Innu (Montagnais Indians) of the Lac St. Jean district (Mashteuiatsh reserve) in 1936. In 1938–1939, she painted the Quebec landscape and the habitants. In 1952, Daly visited Mexico, and later travelled in Spain and Morocco. In 1954, the Peppers spent ten days on a trawler on the Grand Banks of Newfoundland, sketching the fishermen. In 1960, they travelled on the Canadian government steamer C.D. Howe to the Eastern Arctic on the three-month voyage. They drew and painted the Inuit and ice formations, and prepared reports on Inuit art to the Department of Northern Affairs. In 1961, they spent seven weeks in an Inuit home, and depicted the Inuit of Puvirnituq and the District of Ungava. Her images from this period appeared in the government's North magazine.

George Pepper died in 1962. Kathleen Daly continued to travel and paint in Quebec and other regions. Kathleen Daly died in Toronto on 21 August 1994, aged 96.

== Work ==
Kathleen Daly's work has strong line and rhythm, and has been associated with the Group of Seven. The Peppers were good friends of A. Y. Jackson, who also lived in the Studio Building, and who had a marked influence on their landscape styles. As with members of the Group, her work had a strong element of design and used bold patterns. In her choice of subjects, including the native people of Canada, fishermen and miners, she went beyond the Group. Her work in Quebec goes beyond conventional picturesque subjects and reflects an interest in the social and economic conditions of the country people. Some of her paintings of native people also show concern about social issues. Her pictures of Inuit mothers nurturing their children show them as sources of strength, independence and the preservation of their language and culture. Daly made some of the illustrations for Kingdom of the Saguenay (1936) by Marius Barbeau. (Note: Other illustrators of the Kingdom of the Saguenay were Rody Kenny Courtice, A. Y. Jackson, George Pepper, Peter Haworth, Bobs Cogill Haworth, André Charles Biéler, Arthur Lismer, Gordon Edward Pfeiffer, Yvonne McKague Housser and Albert Edward Cloutier.) In 1966, Daly published a book about James Wilson Morrice.

Daly was a prolific artist. In 1975, Daly was asked by the National Gallery of Canada to provide an update to her biographical data. An eleven-page appendix gave a chronology of her painting expeditions and listed her exhibits and commissions, books and articles she had written, reviews and reproductions of her work and works held in public collections. She left a bequest of more than forty works by herself and George Pepper to the University of Lethbridge. Over five hundred paintings by Daly and her husband were left to the Centre d'art Baie-Saint-Paul. Works held at the National Gallery of Canada include:

- Sous-le-Cap, Quebec, 1928. etching and drypoint on wove paper. 44.8 x 32.3 cm; plate: 35.2 x 24.7 cm
- Mackerel, 1931. oil on canvas. 73.8 x 84 cm
- René, 1935. oil on canvas. 92 x 79.1 cm
- L'escalier canadien, c. 1939. oil on canvas. 107 x 92.1 cm

Her works are also held in public gallery collections such as the Art Gallery of Ontario, and the Beaverbrook Art Gallery in Fredericton. Many of her drawings and paintings were sold to private collectors.

== Exhibitions and memberships ==
Between 1930 and 1956, Daly's work was shown in all the main exhibitions in Canada, and also in London, England. Kathleen Daly exhibited at Hart House (1935), the British Empire Exhibition (1936), in the exhibition "A Century of Canadian Art" (1938), and at the Tate in London (1938). She often exhibited with the Royal Canadian Academy of Arts and the Ontario Society of Artists. Often she and her husband exhibited together. In 1999, a retrospective of their work was shown at the McMichael Canadian Art Collection in Kleinburg, Ontario. In 2025, the Confederation Centre Art Gallery, Charlottetown, Prince Edward Island, organized Kathleen Daly Pepper and George Pepper: The Land and its People, curated by Pan Wendt.

Daly joined the Canadian Group of Painters in 1934 and the Ontario Society of Artists in 1936. She became an Associate of the Royal Canadian Academy of Arts in 1937 and an Academician in 1961. She was an executive member of Toronto's Heliconian Club.

== Signature ==
Her work is known under her birth name, with Kay or K. Daly being the signature she applied most often to her art work.
