= Tacon =

Tacon is a surname. Notable people with the surname include:

- Avelin P. Tacon Jr. (1914–2014), American Air Force major general
- Carlos Fernando Martínez de Irujo y Tacón (1763–1824), Spanish Prime Minister and diplomat,
- Christine Tacon (born 1959), British government administrator
- Edna Taçon (1905–1980), Canadian painter
- Ferran Tacón (born 1986), Spanish footballer
- Joy Tacon (born 1961), British tennis player
- Miguel Tacón y Rosique (1777–1855), Spanish soldier and colonial administrator
- Paul Taçon (born 1958), Australian anthropologist and archaeologist

== See also ==
- Paseo de Tacón, promenade in Havana, Cuba
- Tacón Theatre, was a theatre in Havana, Cuba
