= Marc Séguin =

Marc Séguin may refer to:

- Marc Séguin (painter) (born 1970), Canadian painter and novelist
- Marc Seguin (1786–1875), French engineer, inventor of the wire-cable suspension bridge
