= Wood Interior =

Painting by Emily Carr

- Artist: Emily Carr
- Year: 1929-1930
- Medium: Oil on canvas
- Dimensions: 108.7 cm × 70.0 cm (42.8 in × 27.6 in)
- Location: Robert McLaughlin Gallery, Oshawa

Wood Interior is a painting by Canadian artist Emily Carr. It is oil on canvas, and is in the collection of the Robert McLaughlin Gallery, Oshawa, a gift from Isabel McLaughlin. It was painted around 1929 or 1930.

== Background ==
In Emily’s Carr’s painting career, Lawren Harris of the Group of Seven acted as her mentor and friend. He welcomed her into the ranks of Canada's leading modernists and along with other members of the Group of Seven into the Group of Seven shows as an invited contributor in 1930 and 1931.

Carr's artistic direction was influenced by Harris's work and the advice he gave her in their correspondence. He is the one who told her to seek an equivalent for the totem poles in west coast landscape and leave the First Nations subject behind. As a result, in the late twenties and early 1930s, Carr focused on forest scenes in dense compositions. This painting is an example of the change in her work.

In her studio in the autumn of 1928, Carr had taken a three-week advanced course with the American artist Mark Tobey. He taught her about Cubism and gave her specific advice about formal and technical matters. Importantly, he told her to "pep-up" her dark canvases by using lit areas which "pushed" against the dark, using as an example the work of El Greco, who was one of the masters he admired.

As she worked out what she would use of Tobey's advice, she made or considered studies she had done in the woods around Port Renfrew, B.C., a place near her home in Victoria, B.C. A charcoal drawing titled Port Renfrew (c. 1929, Vancouver Art Gallery, 42.3.120), is related to Wood Interior, and shows that Carr originally drew a huge head lying face-up in the forest behind a central tree.

Whatever Carr intended by the head, when she painted Wood Interior in her studio-home, she did not include it. She combined views of the woods she had seen in Port Renfrew with what she had learned from Tobey. In the process, probably following his advice, she added a sun-lit area at upper center. Within it, she painted Cubist facetted forest form. The result must have pleased her because later she used it often in her forest scenes in different combinations.

In a poem on the last leaf of a Journal, Carr wrote about "cedar pine balsam fir/straight and tall" and the "Tangles of dense undergrowth/...in the distance, receding plane/ after plane..." She wrote in the poem that as she painted, she felt "the nearness of God" and "peace content".

Carr dated the poem 1929 and wrote it in Port Renfrew. That date means that she wrote it at almost the same time as Wood Interior. The poem and the painting express her feelings about the scene. For her, the forest provided peace and contentment and, perhaps, things of the spirit.

In 1930, when she was invited to exhibit with the Group of Seven, she decided to send this painting to represent her along with several others. She called it simply Forest. It was no. 21 in the show. After the Group show, she showed her paintings at the Canadian National Exhibition in 1930.

Isabel McLaughlin was herself a painter, and one of Col. Sam McLaughlin's daughters. She saw Wood Interior and bought it. She was in her late twenties and just returned from studying art in Paris, and was familiar with most of the trends in art there. But this painting struck her with considerable force. She did not know the artist`s name, but felt the painting stood out "not only in relation to the Canadian art with which it was shown, but sharply in contrast to art in Paris". "It was like a breath of fresh, invigorating air, totally different from anything I had been seeing in Paris", McLaughlin recalled.

In 1987, McLaughlin gifted the work with other works from her collection to the Robert McLaughlin Gallery in Oshawa.
