= Alicia Boutilier =

Canadian curator (born 1968)

- Born: Alicia Anna Boutilier; 1968 (age 57–58); Welland, Ontario
- Education: Honours BA in English, University of Ottawa (1990); MA in English, Dalhousie University, Halifax (1992); Qualifying Year in Art History, Carleton University, Ottawa, 1995/1996; MA in Canadian Art History, Carleton University, Ottawa, 1998
- Occupation: Art curator
- Known for: Curator of Canadian art with wide-ranging interests, administrator, educator

Alicia Boutilier (born 1968) is the Chief Curator and Curator of Canadian Historical Art at the Agnes Etherington Art Centre in Kingston. She has been Curator of Canadian Historical Art since 2008 and was appointed Chief Curator in 2017. In 2020, she served as the Interim Director at the gallery and received a special recognition award from Queen's University at Kingston for her work as a team leader, adapting to the new realities caused by Covid. She is a Canadian art historian with wide-ranging concerns with emphasis on women artists, artistic groups, regional scenes and collecting histories.

== Career ==
Boutilier was born in Welland and grew up in Niagara Falls, Ontario. She received her Honours BA in English, University of Ottawa (1990); her MA in English, Dalhousie University, Halifax (1992); then did a qualifying year in Art History at Carleton University, Ottawa (1995/1996) and received her MA in Canadian Art History from Carleton University, Ottawa (1998). Boutilier began her career as an exhibition assistant at the show of Helen Galloway McNicoll: A Canadian Impressionist at the Art Gallery of Ontario in 1999, then worked in various jobs at the Art Gallery of Northumberland (1999-2000), the Art Gallery of Hamilton (2001-2006), as an Independent Curator (2005-2008) and as a research assistant at the Art Gallery of Ontario (2006-2008). She was appointed Curator of Canadian Historical Art at the Agnes Etherington Art Centre in 2008, and in 2017, Chief Curator. In 2020, she served as the gallery`s Interim Director.

In her 1998 inaugural show 4 Women Who Painted in the 1930s and 1940s - Rody Kenny Courtice, Bobs Cogill Haworth, Yvonne McKague Housser, and Isabel McLaughlin, she discussed as part of her narrative their striving to promote a wider Canadian consciousness of art. In her exhibitions and publications, she has continued to be interested in such a "wider consciousness" herself, choosing to discuss, for instance, the intersections of art and craft as in quilts (2011) and assisting with the history of the Art Gallery of Hamilton's historical Canadian collection in Lasting Impressions: celebrated works from the Art Gallery of Hamilton (2005).

She focused as well on Canadian historical art in the exhibition and publication of collections such as that of H. B. Southam (2009), Inuit art (2011) and Northern Indigenous Art (2013), as well as on Canadian artists such as Jack Bush (2009) and William Brymner (2010) (co-curated and co-authored with Paul Maréchal of the Musée national des beaux-arts du Québec). Her A Vital Force: The Canadian Group of Painters (CGP) (2013), which she curated, was the first major touring exhibition to focus exclusively on the CGP in an exhibition of major paintings from public and private collections across Canada, for which she received an oaag Curatorial Writing Award for Major Essay. In 2015, she co-curated The Artist Herself: Self-Portraits by Canadian Historical Women Artists (2015) with Tobi Bruce of the Art Gallery of Hamilton, concentrating on what art and craft offered the genre's definition of self-representation. Her 2021 exhibition Tom Thomson: The Art of Authentication, co-curated and authored again with Bruce, established criteria to authenticate a work of art, taking as its focus the work of Tom Thomson.

Boutilier has written entries to the catalogues of such exhibitions as Uninvited, Canadian Women Artists in the Modern Movement, McMichael Canadian Art Collection (2021) as well as writing numerous essays in publications and journals such as "Road Trip Across Canada with Alan C. Collier" which was related to her show of the same name (2017). Since 2009, she has supervised M.A. and Ph.D. theses in the area of Canadian art at Queen's University, Kingston and since 2019, she has served as an adjunct professor in its department of Art History and Conservation. She also has served on many committees, notably for the city of Kingston, and was a Founding member of the Curators of Canadian Historical Art (COCHA), in 2009 and has remained on it till the present.

== Awards ==
- Research Fellowship in Canadian Historical Art, National Gallery of Canada (2004).
- Curatorial Writing Award for Major Essay (A Vital Force: The First Twenty Years), Ontario Association of Art Galleries (OAAG) (2013).
- Certificate of Achievement, Foundational Leadership Program, Queen's University, 2019.
- Special Recognition for Staff Awards 2020 from Queen's University, Kingston, 2020.
