= Joyce Zemans =

Canadian art historian, curator (born 1940)

- Born: Joyce Pearl; April 21, 1940; Toronto, Ontario, Canada
- Education: BA (French) (1962) and MA in art history (1966) from University of Toronto with additional courses at the University of London Courtauld Institute (1961)
- Known for: first woman to serve as York University`s Dean of Fine Arts and as director of the Canada Council for the Arts (1988-1992)
- Spouse: Frederick H. Zemans (m. 1960)
- Awards: Order of Canada (2003)

Joyce Zemans CM (born April 21, 1940) is a Canadian art historian, curator, cultural policy specialist and academic. She is known as the first woman to serve as York University`s Dean of Fine Arts and as director of the Canada Council for the Arts (1988-1992).

== Career ==
Zemans received her BA in French (1962) and her MA in art history (1966) from the University of Toronto, with additional courses at the Courtauld Institute University of London (1961). She was hired as a lecturer in art history (1966–1975) by OCA in Toronto, chaired the Department of art history (1970–1972) and served as founder and the first chair of the Department of Liberal Arts Studies (1973–1975). She was then hired by York University in Toronto as Associate Professor of Art History (1975–1995) and Chair of the Department of Visual Arts, Faculty of Fine Arts (now the School of Arts Media Performance and Design) (1975–1981), and as Dean of the Faculty of Fine Arts (1985–1988).

From 1988 to 1992, she was director of the Canada Council, Ottawa. The author of the history of the council has written: “Ask …. about Joyce Zemans' time at the Canada Council and they will say "equity". It was under her leadership that Council began to take racial equality and Indigenous art seriously.....Zemans' tenure at the council is often associated with her efforts to expand...programming to Indigenous and culturally diverse communities".

In 1992, she returned to teaching at York, then as acting director of the graduate program in art history (1994–1995), later developing the diploma in curatorial studies. In 1995, she was honoured with a University Professorship. She was appointed Robarts Chair in Canadian Studies (1995–1996). In 1994, she became co-director of the MBA Program in Arts, Media and Entertainment Management in York's Schulich School of Business and served as co-director and director of that program for over 25 years, retiring in 2020 as Senior Scholar; University Professor Emerita.

== Writing ==
Her publications include catalogues and essays for exhibitions she curated including: J.W.G. Macdonald: The Inner Landscape (Art Gallery of Ontario, 1981) which was praised in a peer review for its "diligent research, immensely readable prose and masterful organization"; Alexandra Luke, Christopher Pratt, Kathleen Munn and Edna Taçon, Bertram Brooker and Tony Urquhart. Other publications include an Art Gallery Handbook and Museums after Modernism, Strategies of Engagement, of which she was the co-editor with Griselda Pollock, as well as books on Sorel Etrog, "Sorel Etrog: Paintings and Drawings: 1963 – 1971", and Jock Macdonald: Life and Work (Art Canada Institute, https://www.aci-iac.ca/art-books/jock-macdonald).

She has written Chapters in books including one on Frederick Horsman Varley in Frederick H. Varley (1983), and on "The History of Abstract Painting in English Canada", in The Visual Arts in Canada: the Twentieth Century (Oxford, 2007). She has written or co-authored numerous articles on the themes of 'Where Are the Women?' in Canadian art, and on the National Gallery of Canada's program of reproductions of Canadian art in the Journal of Canadian Art History.

Her publications in the field of cultural policy include: Where is Here? Canadian Cultural Policy in a Globalized World (1997), Comparing cultural policy: A study of Japan and the United States co-edited with Archie Kleingartner (Altamira, 1999) and Making Change: Fifty Years of the Laidlaw Foundation co-edited with Nathan Gilbert (ECW Press). She has also written entries for The Canadian Encyclopedia and has served as a member of the editorial advisory boards of scholarly journals in the fields of art history and cultural policy and is a member of the advisory committees of such institutions as the Toronto Arts Council and others.

== Honours ==
- University Professorship, York University (1995)
- Honorary Doctor of Fine Arts, Nova Scotia College of Art and Design (1995)
- Honorary Fellow, Ontario College of Art and Design (1997)
- Distinguished Woman Scholar, Visiting Lectureship, University of Victoria residency (2000)
- Honorary Life Member of the Canadian Conference of the Arts (2001)
- Queen's Golden Jubilee Medal (2002)
- Appointed Member of the Order of Canada (2003)
- Honorary Doctor of Letters, University of Waterloo (2004)
- Appointed Senior Scholar and University Professor Emerita, York University (2005-)
- Diplome d’honneur, Canadian Conference of the Arts (2010)
- Queen's Diamond Jubilee Medal (2013)
- Honorary Doctorate, Concordia University (2013)
- University College, University of Toronto Alumni of Influence Award (2014)
- Academic Achievement Award, Canadian Association of Fine Arts Deans (2021)
- Honoured by Canadian Women's Art History Initiative (2021)
