= Randolph Hewton =

Canadian painter

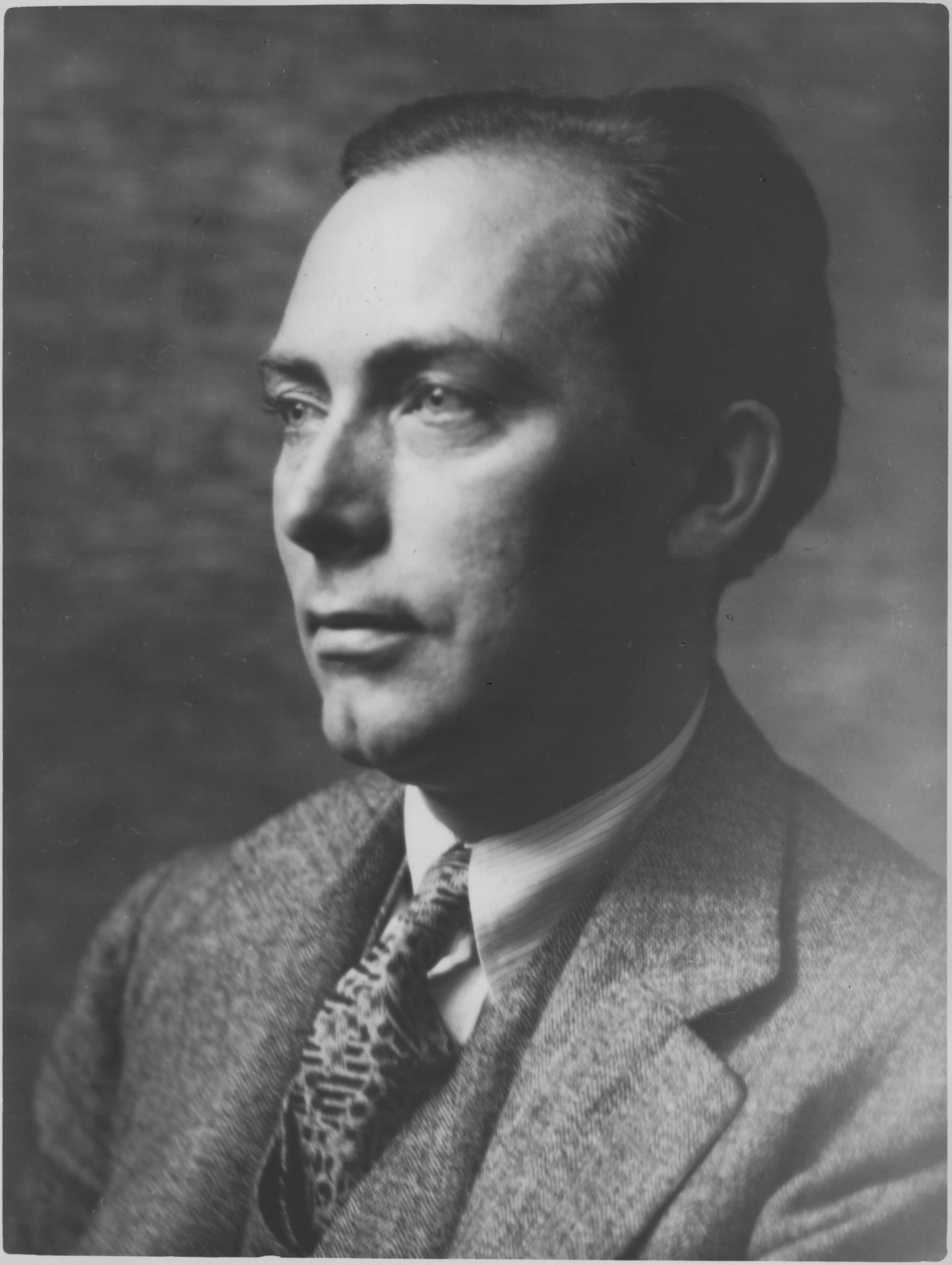
- Born: Randolph Stanley Hewton; June 12, 1888; Maple Grove, Quebec
- Died: March 17, 1960 (aged 71); Belleville, Ontario
- Education: Art Association of Montreal with William Brymner (1903-1907); Académie Julian in Paris with Jean-Paul Laurens (1908-1910) and with Henry Caro-Delvaile (1910-1913)
- Spouse: Isobel Monk (née Robertson)
- Awards: Member in 1934, Royal Canadian Academy of Arts

Randolph Stanley Hewton RCA MC (June 12, 1888 – March 17, 1960) was a Canadian artist, known for his figurative work and as a colorist.

== Career ==
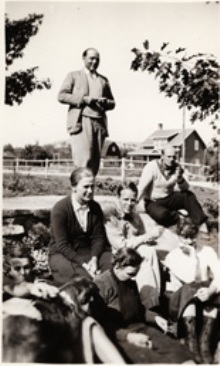
Randolph Hewton, Isabel McLaughlin, Gordon Webber, Audrey Taylor, Prudence Heward and Rody Kenny Courtice, around 1935

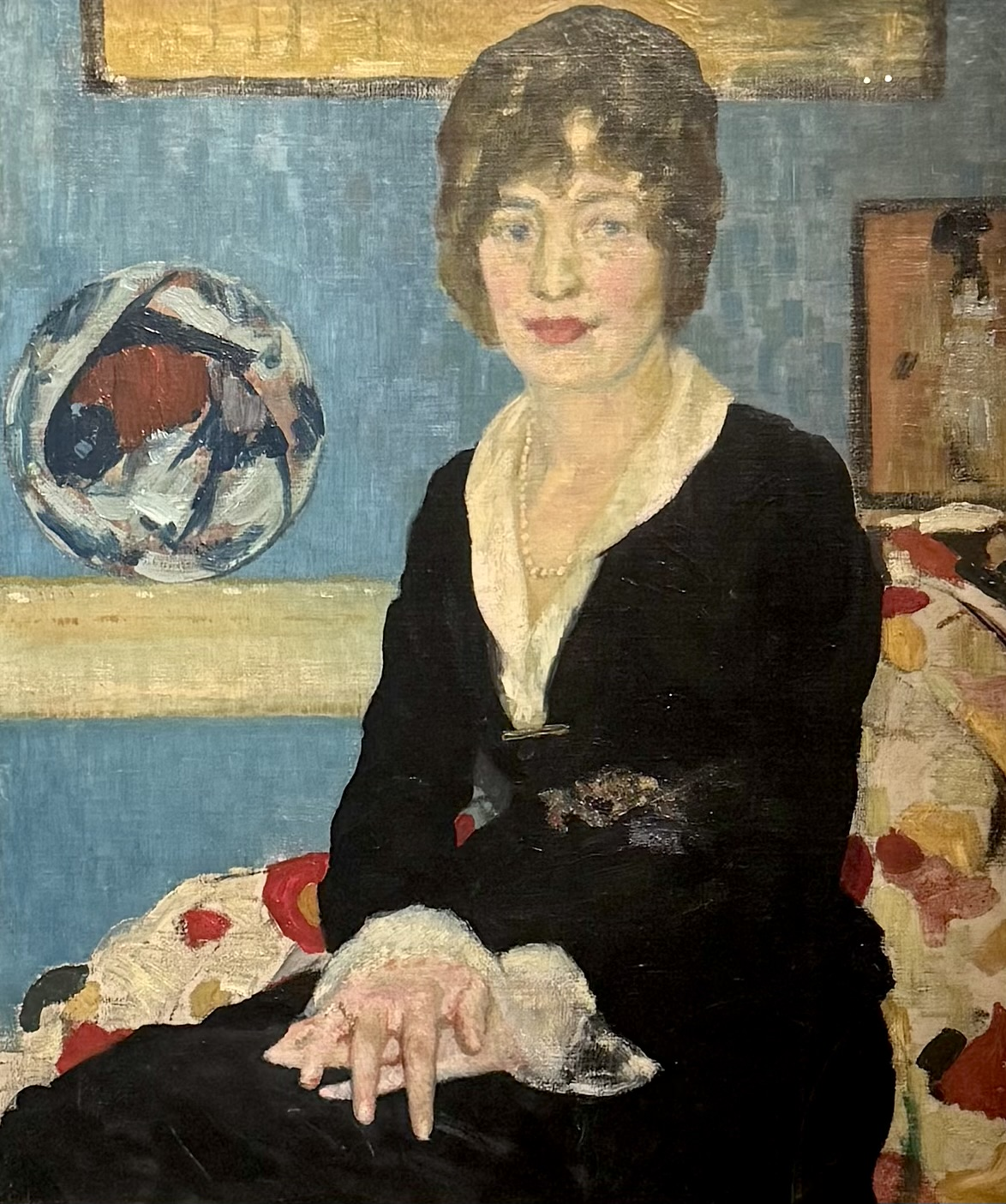
Portrait: Lady in a Black Dress (1921)

He was born in Maple Grove, Quebec, and studied with William Brymner at the Art Association of Montreal, going on to study at the Académie Julian in Paris where in 1912 he met A. Y. Jackson. He served overseas during World War I, taking part in the Somme offensive, and was awarded the Military Cross in 1918. After the war, he worked for Miller Brothers, paper box manufacturers, and became company president in 1921. He left the company to concentrate on painting but had returned to the position of company president by 1926. Hewton also married Isobel Monk (née Robertson) around this time. In 1933, he moved away from Montreal when Miller Brothers moved to Glen Miller, Ontario.

Hewton was invited to show with the Group of Seven in 1920 and he helped found the Beaver Hall Group, a group of Canadian visual artists based in Montreal, that same year. He went on painting trips with Jackson, and Albert Robinson. He was the director and senior painting instructor at the Art Association of Montreal School of Art in the early 1920s. He also was a founding member of the Canadian Group of Painters and was elected to the Royal Canadian Academy of Arts in 1934.

Hewton died in Belleville, Ontario, at the age of 71.

His works are held in the collections of the National Gallery of Canada, the Musée national des beaux-arts du Québec and the Art Gallery of Ontario.
