= Mario Barone =

Italian-born Canadian soccer player

Personal information
- Date of birth: 2 January 1948 (age 78)
- Place of birth: Italy
- Position: Forward

Senior career*
| Years | Team | Apps | (Gls) |
| 1964 | Catanzaro | | |
| 1967 | Italia | | |
| 1968 | Toronto Falcons | 9 | (1) |
| 1969 | Toronto Italia | | |
| 1972 | Vittore-San Marco | | |
- * Club domestic league appearances and goals

Mario Barone (born January 2, 1948) is an Italian-born Canadian former soccer player who played as a forward.

== Career ==
Barone played in the Toronto and District Soccer League in the Fifth Division with Catanzaro in 1964. In 1967, he played with Italia in the First Division of the Toronto and District League. He also played at the high school level and graduated from Central Technical School. In 1968, he played in the North American Soccer League with the Toronto Falcons. In his debut season with Toronto, he played in nine matches and recorded one goal.

The following season, he played in the National Soccer League with Toronto Italia. In his debut season in the NSL, he assisted Italia in securing the NSL Cup. In 1972, he returned to the Toronto and District League and played with Vittore-San Marco.
