= Étienne Biéler =

Canadian physicist (1895–1929)

Étienne Samuel Biéler
- Born: 3 February 1895; Lausanne, Switzerland
- Died: 25 July 1929 (aged 34); Geraldton, Western Australia
- Citizenship: Canadian
- Education: McGill University (BSc 1915, MSc 1920); Gonville and Caius College, Cambridge (PhD 1923)
- Known for: strong interaction
- Scientific career
- Fields: Physics
- Workplaces: Cavendish laboratory; McGill University
- Thesis: The Law of Force in the Immediate Neighbourhood of the Atomic Nucleus (1923)
- Doctoral advisor: James Chadwick

Étienne Samuel Biéler (3 February 1895 – 25 July 1929) was a Swiss-born Canadian physicist who made important advances in the study of the strong interaction that holds the atomic nucleus together.

A graduate of McGill University, he worked at the Cavendish Laboratory, where he studied the atomic nucleus under Sir Ernest Rutherford and James Chadwick. A 1921 paper with Chadwick has been hailed as "marking the birth of the strong interactions". In his doctoral thesis, Biéler explored the strong interaction, and showed that it varied with the fourth power of the distance.

Biéler returned to Canada, where he was appointed assistant professor of physics at McGill. He became interested in geophysics, and he attempted to develop electrical methods for detecting hidden bodies of ore. He was given two years' leave from McGill to participate in an Imperial Geophysical Experimental Survey to try out various methods of ore detection. While in Australia he became ill and died of pneumonia on 28 July 1929.

== Biography ==
=== Early life ===
Étienne Samuel Biéler was born in Lausanne, Switzerland, on 3 February 1895, the second of five sons of Professor Charles Biéler and Blanche Merle-D'Aubigné. His father was Director of Collège Gaillard and his mother was the daughter of the historian Jean-Henri Merle d'Aubigné. Étienne moved to Paris for twelve years with his parents and brothers, Jean, André and Jacques, before the whole family immigrated in 1908 to Canada. His father Charles accepted the position of registrar of the Presbyterian College in Montreal and his younger brother André Charles Biéler later became a renowned painter and professor of art at Queen's University.

Biéler entered McGill University, which awarded him his Bachelor of Science (BSc) degree on Mathematics in 1915. During the First World War, he enlisted in the 38th Battalion (Ottawa), CEF on 29 March 1915. He transferred to Princess Patricia's Canadian Light Infantry on 17 July 1915. On 23 February 1916 he transferred to the Canadian Field Artillery, joining the 3rd Field Artillery Brigade on 23 February 1916, then the 12th Field Artillery Brigade on 28 June 1916, and finally the 1st Field Artillery Brigade on 20 March 1917. He was wounded twice, on 3 August 1916 and again on 29 April 1917, and rose to the rank of lieutenant. During the later part of the war, he worked in the Anti-Submarine Division of the British Admiralty, on methods for locating submarines.

=== Nuclear physics ===
After the war, Biéler resumed his education, earning a Master of Science (MSc) degree in Physics from McGill in 1920. He was awarded 1851 Research Fellowship from the Royal Commission for the Exhibition of 1851 to study at Caius College, Cambridge, and joined the Cavendish Laboratory as a research student. There worked with Sir Ernest Rutherford, studying the bombardment of the atom with alpha particles. A 1921 paper with James Chadwick on The Collisions of Particles with Hydrogen Nuclei, has been hailed by Abraham Pais as "marking the birth of the strong interactions".

Biéler's insights into the strong interaction that bound the atomic nucleus together were presented in hisDoctor of Philosophy (PhD) thesis, titled The Law of Force in the Immediate Neighbourhood of the Atomic Nucleus, which he completed under the supervision of James Chadwick in 1923. In his thesis, Biéler attempted to explain the apparent breakdown of the inverse square law in the vicinity of the nucleus. By studying the scattering of alpha particles by aluminum and magnesium, he showed that the strong interaction varied with the fourth power of the distance.

=== Geophysics ===
Returning to Canada, Biéler accepted an appointment as assistant professor of physics at McGill. He became a member of the Royal Astronomical Society of Canada of 1924, although he never conducted any research into astronomy or astrophysics. He developed an interest in geophysics, and attempted to develop electrical methods for detecting hidden ore bodies, carrying out experiments in northern Quebec and Ontario in 1926 and 1927.

This research attracted widespread attention, and the Empire Marketing Board established an Imperial Geophysical Experimental Survey to try out various methods of ore detection, with Arthur Broughton Edge as its director. Biéler was given two years' leave from McGill to become its deputy director. After negotiations between the Empire Marketing Board and the Australian government, it was agreed that the survey be conducted in Australia rather than Canada or South Africa.

Biéler arrived in Australia in July 1928, and inspected areas in South Australia before moving on to Western Australia, where he was joined by Alexander Ross from the University of Western Australia and Alexander Rankine from Imperial College London. In July 1929, Biéler took a train to Northampton, but only got as far as Geraldton when he fell ill. He was taken to Geraldton Hospital, where he died of pneumonia on 28 July 1929. His papers are in the McGill University archives.
