= Frances K. Smith =

Canadian curator (1913–2012)

- Born: 19 November 1913; Bolton, England
- Died: 22 December 2012 (aged 99); Calgary, Alberta
- Education: Queen's University, Kingston (1956)
- Known for: curator, scholar, donor
- Spouse: Walter MacFarlane Smith (m. 1940)
- Awards: Queen's University Distinguished Service Award (1987)

Frances K. Smith (19 November 1913 – 22 December 2012) was the founding curator of the Agnes Etherington Art Centre in Kingston, Ontario. Through her series of exhibitions and scholarly catalogues and books of 19th and early 20th century Canadian artists, she made a contribution to the study of the visual arts in Canada. She was recognized by Moncrieff Williamson, an early gallery director in Charlottetown, as almost the only professional curator who was a woman active on the early scene of public art galleries in Canada, 1957 on. (Note: There were others. Paddy Gunn O'Brien was hired by the London Regional Gallery (now Museum London) in London, Ontario in 1952.) "How much southern Ontario owes these people", he wrote.

== Career ==
Smith was born in Bolton, England. She and her husband, Canadian-born Dr. Walter MacFarlane Smith, emigrated to Canada in 1944, journeying to Quebec City. In 1946, they moved to Kingston. Smith studied at Queen's University, graduating in 1956. In 1957, she was hired as the assistant to director André Charles Biéler at the Agnes Etherington Art Centre in Kingston which opened in October of the same year. She helped build the collection, catalogued all the artwork at Queen's, organized exhibitions and wrote landmark publications on Kingston artists, chased funds and published catalogues, books and articles, many of which have not been superseded, such as her catalogue of Daniel Fowler and her book on André Biéler. She discussed her difficulties in building a collection for a University and public gallery in an article in Artscanada. Twice, she served as acting director.

She retired as curator emeritus in 1980, having served as an inspirational figure who helped the gallery develop its identity and community presence. Her contribution was considered "incomparable."

After her retirement, she acted as a donor to the gallery she had served for a quarter of a century and established the Frances K. Smith Fund for public lectures on art as well as a scholarship in Canadian Art History at the University. She was awarded the Queen's University Distinguished Service Award in 1987 and a gallery at the Agnes Etherington was named for her. Frances K. Smith died in Calgary, Alberta, on 22 December 2012.

== Selected publications ==
- "Daniel Fowler, 1810-1894" (Toronto: Dundurn Press, 1977);
- Daniel Fowler of Amherst Island, 1810-1894 (Kingston, Ont.: Agnes Etherington Art Centre, 1979);
- George Harlow White, RCA, 1817-1887 (Kingston, Ont.: Agnes Etherington Art Centre, 1975);
- "André Biéler: an artist's life and times" (Toronto: Merritt Pub., 1980);
- The brave new world of Fritz Brandtner= Le meilleur des mondes de Fritz Brandtner by Helen Duffy, Frances K. Smith (Kingston, Ont.: Agnes Etherington Art Centre, 1982);
- Kathleen Moir Morris (Kingston, Ont.: Agnes Etherington Art Centre, 1983);
- André Biéler in rural Québec (Kingston, Ont.: The Centre, Queen's University, 1988);
