= Aba Bayefsky =

Canadian artist (1923–2001)

Aba Bayefsky CM RCA
- Born: April 7, 1923; Toronto, Ontario, Canada
- Died: May 5, 2001 (aged 78); Toronto, Ontario, Canada

Aba Bayefsky CM RCA (April 7, 1923 – May 5, 2001) was an artist and teacher.

== Career ==
Bayefsky was born to a Jewish family in Toronto, Ontario, the second son of a Russian-born father and a Scottish-born mother. He studied at the Central Technical School. During his teens, he attended classes at the Children's Art Centre of the Art Gallery of Ontario, where he was encouraged by such artists as Arthur Lismer, Erma Sutcliffe, Dorothy Medhurst, and A. Y. Jackson. He later studied at the Académie Julian in Paris.

Bayefsky enlisted in the RCAF in October 1942, and was made a flight lieutenant. He was appointed an official Second World War artist in December, 1944, assigned to depict airborne operations over north-west Europe. He entered the Bergen-Belsen concentration camp shortly after its liberation and recorded what he saw in sketchbooks (these were destroyed in a fire later). But Bergen-Belsen became a part of his creative imagination. The Canadian War Museum has 9 works by Bayefsky of scenes in Bergen-Belsen.

After the war, he was an instructor at the Ontario College of Art. In 1958, he was made a member of the Royal Canadian Academy of Arts and in 1979, he was made a member of the Order of Canada. Throughout the late 1970s and early 1980s, Bayefsky maintained an interest in tattooing and produced a series of portraits of tattooed people from Toronto and Japan.
