= James Edward Le Rossignol =

Canadian-American economist (1866–1959)

- Born: 24 October 1866; Quebec City, Canada East
- Died: 4 December 1959 (aged 93)
- Occupations: Economist, author
- Spouse: Jessie Katherine Ross (m. 1898)

James Edward Le Rossignol (24 October 1866 – 4 December 1959) was a Canadian-born American professor of economics with a particular interest in socialism, and also the author of several works of fiction with settings in Quebec.

== Life ==
James Edward Le Rossignol was born on 24 October 1866 in Quebec City, the son of Peter Le Rossignol and Mary (née Gillispie). His father was born on the Jersey Channel Islands. He was educated at the Montreal High School and Huntington academy. He went on to McGill University in Montreal, Leipzig University in Germany and Clark University in Worcester, Massachusetts, earning a B.A., Ph.D., and LL.D. In 1898, he married Jessie Katherine Ross.

Le Rossignol was a professor of economics at the University of Denver in 1907. He was appointed professor of economics at the University of Nebraska in 1911, and director of the School of Commerce from 1913 to 1919. In 1919, he was appointed dean of the College of Business Administration. He wrote works on economics as well as several books of short stories and the novel Jean Baptiste (1915). Le Rossignol died on 4 December 1959.

== Writings ==
Le Rossignol's 1901 Monopolies Past and Present, said to "provide an historical introduction to the study of monopolies for the use of busy men", covered ancient monopolies, gilds, exclusive trading companies, patents, municipal monopolies, railways and capitalistic monopolies. A reviewer said that "it seems to be tolerably well adapted to the needs of the larger constituency for which it was designed." The book was criticized for poor coverage of joint stock undertakings and development of the business corporation. It presented the standard arguments for industrial combinations.

A review of Le Rossignol's 1907 Orthodox Socialism said, "One of our ablest writers on economics here defines broadly the creed of socialism, and points out its weaknesses. Strikes, labor unions, the struggle of mass with class, and the perpetual questions of wages and profit come in for their share of intelligent attention. The book is worth pondering over by every earnest voter". Talking of Karl Marx's theory of value, La Rossignol wrote, "Orthodox socialists are deeply concerned to prove it true, for if it can be shown that all values are created by labor alone, it must surely follow that all should belong to the hand and brain that created them."

Le Rossignol was at the University of Denver when he published his 1910 book on State Socialism in New Zealand, co-authored with William Downie Stewart Jr, a barrister in Dunedin, New Zealand. A reviewer said the authors had achieved their very laudable aim of showing the "workings of the various social experiments as they are without exaggeration of concealment." The reviewer called the book "an illuminating study of the remarkable series of instructive experiments in socialistic legislation, for which New Zealand has become conspicuous, together with that Australian Commonwealth, which is its nearest neighbour."

Peter Haworth and his wife Bobs Cogill Haworth jointly illustrated Le Rossignol's The Habitant Merchant (1939), a collection of short stories.

== Bibliography ==
Non-fiction

- (1892). The Ethical Philosophy of Samuel Clarke.
- (1901). Monopolies Past and Present.
- (1902). Taxation in Colorado.
- (1903). History of Higher Education in Colorado.
- (1907). Orthodox Socialism.
- (1910). State Socialism in New Zealand (with William Downie Stewart).
- (1921). What is Socialism?
- (1923). Economics for Everyman.
- (1926). First Economics.
- (1940). From Marx to Stalin.
- (1943). Inflation and How to Scotch It.

Selected articles

- (1912). "The March of Socialism," The University Magazine, Vol. XI, pp. 429–445.

Fiction

- (1908). Little Stories of Old Quebec (short stories)
- (1915). Jean Baptiste: A Story of French Canada
- (1928). The Beauport Road (Tales of Old Quebec, short stories)
- (1929). The Flying Canoe (La Chasse-Galerie, short stories) Illustrated by Franz Johnston
- (1939). The Habitant-Merchant (short stories)
