= Harold Klunder =

Canadian painter (born 1943)

- Born: 1943 (age 82–83); Deventer, The Netherlands
- Education: Central Technical School, Toronto
- Partner: Catherine Carmichael
- Elected: Royal Canadian Academy of Arts

Harold Klunder RCA (born 1943) is a Canadian painter.

== Career ==
Born in Deventer, The Netherlands, Klunder emigrated with his family to Canada in 1952. He studied art at the Central Technical School, Toronto.

In 1994, he began to teach at Memorial University of Newfoundland and in 1997–1998, he taught at University of Lethbridge, Alberta.

== Work ==
Klunder is principally known for his abstract paintings which are based on a non-traditional notion of "the self-portrait". They often feature an abundant use of paint, applied in layers, and take years to complete. From 1971 to 1979, he used images and patterns often taken from found objects and geometric shapes. He began using oils in 1980 instead of acrylic, thus increasing the sense of materiality of the paint. In the early 1980s, he began developing a figural reference through drawing. By the mid-1980s, Klunder created "portraits" in paint, using his abstract language. He called such work "psychic realism" and his use of an expressionist element was in touch with international painting. In about 1997, his work became more open and brighter, but still suggested figural elements.

== Selected exhibitions, collections and memberships ==
His work has been widely exhibited, both in Canada and abroad. In 1996, the Tom Thomson Memorial Gallery in Owen Sound organized an exhibition, as did Museum London in 1999 curated by Ted Fraser titled Harold Klunder: In the Forest of Symbols. In 2020, his work was included in Painting Nature with a Mirror, a group show from the collection of the Musée d'art contemporain de Montréal. His work is also included in public collections such as the National Gallery of Canada, the Art Gallery of Ontario, and the Art Gallery of Newfoundland and Labrador. He was made a member of the Royal Canadian Academy of Arts.

== Personal life ==
In 1983, he moved to Flesherton, Ontario, northwest of Toronto. In 1980, he moved to Montreal where he lives now with his partner Catherine Carmichael and best friend/artist Shane West. His daughter Saskia Carmichael Klunder, actress/dancer, lives in Montreal, Quebec, and Elizabeth Carmichael Klunder lives in Toronto, Ontario. Klunder also has a son, Willem Klunder, living in Europe (from a previous marriage).

== Bibliography ==
- Murray, Joan (1999). Canadian Art in the Twentieth Century. Toronto: Dundurn. OCLC 260193722.
- Nasgaard, Roald (2008). Abstract Painting in Canada. Douglas & McIntyre. pp. 265–267. ISBN 9781553653943.
