= Musée d'art contemporain de Baie-Saint-Paul =

Museum in Baie-Saint-Paul, Quebec, Canada

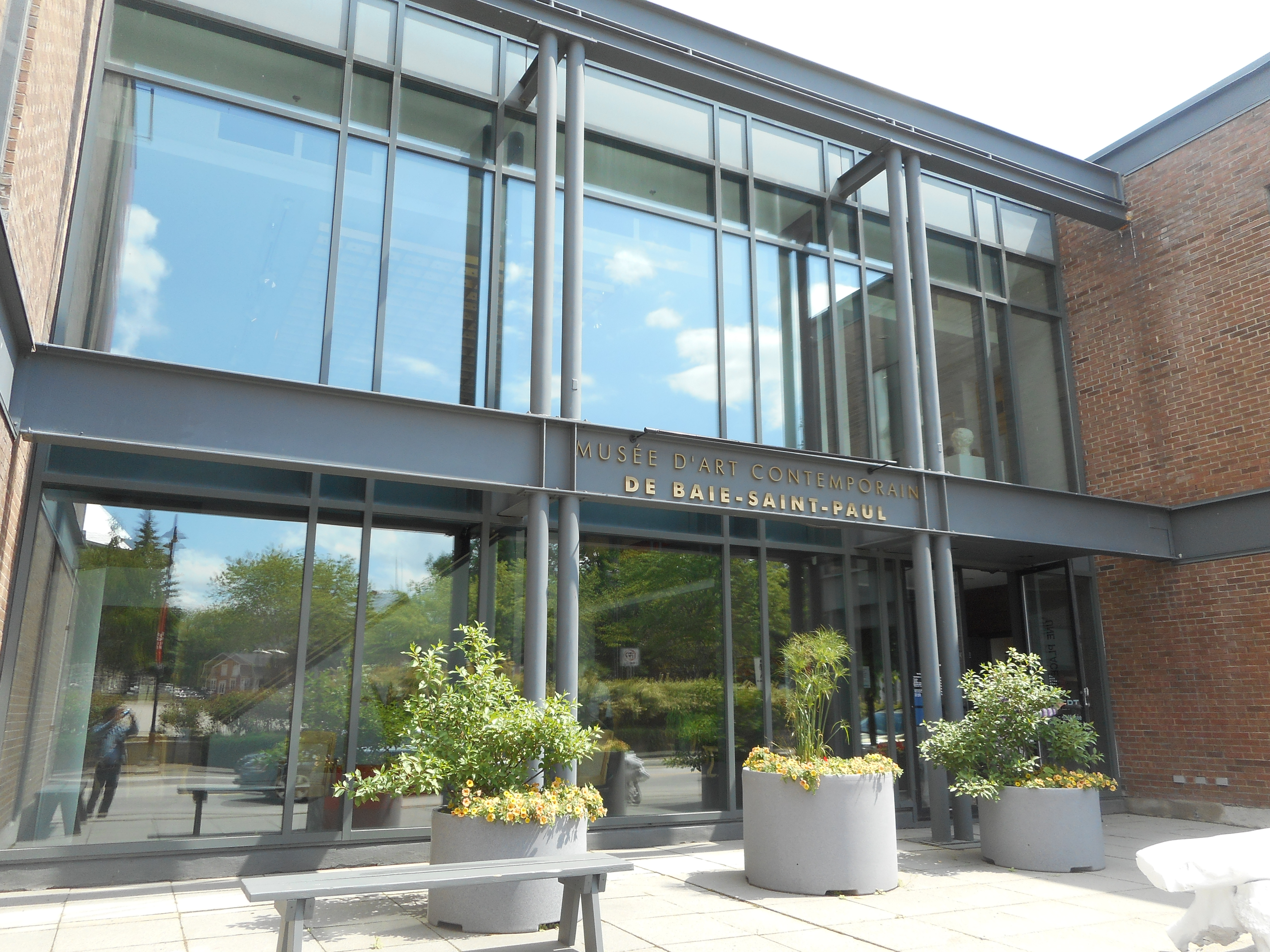
- Entrance to Musée d'art contemporain de Baie-Saint-Paul
- Established: 1992
- Location: Baie-Saint-Paul, Quebec, Canada
- Coordinates: 47.439892°N 70.506545°W
- Type: Contemporary art
- Website: www.macbsp.com

The Musée d'art contemporain de Baie-Saint-Paul, formerly the Centre d'art de Baie-Saint-Paul, is housed in the Centre d’exposition de Baie-St-Paul. It is a contemporary art museum in Baie-Saint-Paul, Quebec, Canada.

== Origins ==
The museum is located in downtown Baie-Saint-Paul in the heart of the cultural district.

The site used to be occupied by Le Laurentien, a cinema that was also used for artistic activities. After World War II (1939–45) the cinema often put on regional shows and travelling theatrical troupes. In the mid-1980s the Art Centre Corporation (Corporation du Centre d’art) launched an appeal for a public subscription to build a new exhibition centre for artistic and cultural activities in the Charlevoix region. $100,000 was raised.

The cinema was too dilapidated to be preserved, but on January 24, 1992, a new building was opened on the site.

The Centre d’exposition de Baie-St-Paul was designed by noted architect Pierre Thibault. It has large rooms and huge glass panels on the wall facing the church. The museum is partially accessible to the physically disabled. It has meeting facilities and a boutique.

The three-story building won first prize for an institutional building in 1992 from the Ordre des architectes du Québec.

== History ==
Françoise Labbé become general director of the Centre d'exposition and general and artistic director of the Centre d'art de Baie-Saint-Paul in which it was housed, in 1993. Labbé was made a Knight of the Ordre National du Québec in 1997. She continued as director of the centre until her death in 2001.

A number of large exhibitions were held during her term as director. Thousands came out for Jean-Paul Riopelle's visit in 1998, which included his celebrated Ice Canoe hung from the ceiling. Painter Marc Séguin exhibited there in 2001, returning later as well in 2013.

The centre was given museum status in 2008. The announcement was made by then-minister of Culture, Communications and the Status of Women Christine St-Pierre on July 16, 2008.

== Purpose ==
The goal of the museum is to make known, promote and preserve contemporary art from 1947 to the present. It emphasizes contemporary artists and is open to new movements and forms of expression.

It is the only museum in eastern Quebec entirely devoted to contemporary art. It is open year-round. Tours are given in French and English.

The museum runs the annual International Symposium of Contemporary Art of Baie-Saint-Paul, which brings together artists from different backgrounds, and encourages interactions with members of the public.

== Collection ==
The Museum's International Symposium of Contemporary Art brings together artists from around the world to create. Its legacy is a collection of works by over 500 artists.

Kathleen Daly (1898–1994) left over 500 paintings, her own and those of her husband George Pepper (1903–1962), to the Centre d’art Baie-Saint-Paul in 1994.

The Art Centre Corporation acquired a valuable collection with works by other major figures in the history of painting in Quebec such as René Richard, the Bolduc sisters and others.

== See also ==
- List of art museums
- List of museums in Quebec
