= Marc Séguin (painter) =

French Canadian painter and novelist (born 1970)

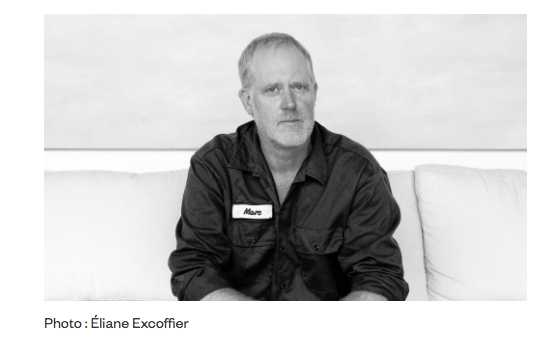
- Born: March 20, 1970 (age 56); Ottawa, Ontario, Canada
- Occupations: Painter and novelist

Marc Séguin (born March 20, 1970) is a French Canadian painter and novelist whose work is held in several important collections.

== Life ==
Marc Séguin was born in Ottawa, Ontario on March 20, 1970. He studied at Concordia University, where he obtained a bachelor's degree in Fine Arts. He writes, paints and makes prints. Recurrent themes in his writings and visual works include destruction, terrorism, the papacy, dictatorship and serial killers. One of his more macabre concepts has been to make paintings using human ashes. He is the father of four children, and divides his time between his organic farm in Hemmingford, Quebec, and his studio in Brooklyn, New York. A documentary film has been made of his life in Hemmingford.

== Exhibitions and collections ==
Séguin's first solo exhibition in 1996 was well received. In 1997 the Musée d'art contemporain de Montréal invited him to participate in the group exhibit De fougue et de passion, and in 2000 invited him to hold a personal exhibition of large paintings based on medieval rose windows. In the summer of 2001 this exhibition was shown at the Canadian Cultural Center in Paris. It toured Canada in 2003-04. Séguin has exhibited at the Musée d'art contemporain de Baie-Saint-Paul twice, in 2001 and 2013. The Musée d’art contemporain de Montréal, the Montreal Museum of Fine Arts and the Musée national des beaux-arts du Québec have all acquired his works, as have many corporate and individual collectors. Séguin has participated in many group exhibitions in North America and Europe.

== Novels ==
- La Foi du braconnier, éditions Leméac, 2009
- Hollywood, éditions Leméac, 2012 (Finalist in the 2013 Governor General's Awards)
- Nord Alice, éditions Leméac, 2015

=== Film ===
- Stealing Alice, 2016
- Piluk, 2026 (with Elisapie)

== Sources ==
- "GG 2013 French Winners and Finalists". Canadian Council for the Arts. Archived from the original on 2013-08-10.
- "Marc Séguin", Les francs-tireurs, Télé-Québec, 2013, archived from the original on 2014-07-28
- "Marc Séguin de retour au Musée d'art contemporain de Baie-Saint-Paul". Le Soleil. 19 June 2013.
- "Marc Séguin". Galeries Simon Blais.
- Petrowski, Nathalie (11 September 2010). "Marc Séguin: le peintre des ruines modernes". La Presse.
