= Edna Taçon =

Canadian painter

- Born: Edna Jeannette MacDougall; 18 August 1905; Milwaukee, Wisconsin
- Died: 1980 (aged 74–75); New York, New York
- Education: University of Toronto (1927)
- Occupation: Painter
- Movement: non-objective art
- Spouse(s): Percy Henry Taçon (married 1929-1948); Paul Arnold (married 1949-1949)

Edna Jeanette Taçon, whose name is often written, incorrectly, as Edna Tacon, (born Milwaukee, Wisconsin in 1905, died New York, New York in 1980) was a Canadian pioneer of modernism.

== Early years ==
Edna Taçon was born as Edna Jeanette MacDougall. Her father, a violinist in vaudeville theaters, died when she was six years old. As a result, her mother gave her up for adoption to a widow, Mrs. Jane MacFarlane, of Goderich, Ontario. Taçon was trained as a violinist and moved with her adopted mother to Toronto in 1924 to pursue a degree in music. She graduated with a bachelor's degree in Music from the University of Toronto in 1927. That year, Lawren Harris brought to Toronto, a show of non-objective art which included Kandinsky, the International Exhibition of Modern Art from the Collection of the Société Anonyme, New York. Charles Comfort, who worked at the show as a docent, was convinced that many artists, Taçon among them, experimented with non-representational painting because of it.

The real reason Taçon chose to paint and paint abstractly was her husband, Percy Henry Taçon, whom she married in April 1929. Although she continued to perform and study the violin in New York and Europe, notably in Switzerland with Oscar Studer during the summer of 1935, her husband's career as a painter and instructor of art and modern languages influenced her in her decision to pursue painting and, particularly, abstraction. Art historians Joyce Zemans, Elizabeth Burrell, and Elizabeth Hunter have written that "Taçon would later tell an interviewer that it was her husband who encouraged her to investigate abstraction," after he began drawing abstractly in 1937.

== Work ==
Taçon was influenced by Kandinsky's theories on abstraction and color and saw the relationship between abstract painting and music as similarly intuitive and creative. She wrote: "Many people will say that painting cannot reach the sublime summit that music has attained as an abstract art. But there is an analogy between music and painting when both are nonrepresentational ... It is the ambitious aim of our modern artist to exploit...all the ramifications of such an analogy."

Taçon used collage in her early years, employing the term "paper plastics," to describe these works. She may have come across this term through the writing Hilla Rebay, curator of the Museum of Non-Objective Painting in New York, who used it in a catalogue as early as 1939. She became involved with the Museum of Non-Objective Painting in 1941 when she took some of her paper plastics to be critiqued. As a result, Taçon was awarded a scholarship by the Foundation and three works by Taçon were exhibited in March 1941 as part of the exhibit Ten American Non-Objective Painters. Taçon was to spend a number of years moving back and forth between Hamilton and New York City. In the fall of 1941 she had her first solo shows in New York at Studio 83 and in Toronto at the Eaton's Fine Arts Galleries. She was at this time working in oils, gouache, and ink, as well as in paper plastics.

== Career ==
Starting in 1942, Taçon's work was included in a series of group shows by the Guggenheim Foundation and in 1943 she joined the museum as a hostess and guide. She was increasingly exhibited in Canada as well. The Art Gallery of Toronto included her in the exhibition Four Canadian Artists, also featuring Jessie Faunt, Michael Forster, and Gordon Webber. She had seven solo shows between 1941-1947 at Eaton's Fine Arts Galleries and was shown in the Hamilton Women's Art Association's annual Spring show in 1942 and 1943.

In 1945, Taçon was included for the first time in the Ontario Society of Artists annual exhibition. The Canadian Group of Painters invited her to exhibit as a non-member in their 1945-46 show. In January 1946, she was elected to the membership of the group. Writing on the 1945-46 Group show, Graham Innes commented that the Group was "in a rut" and that the most interesting work was in the field of reportage and abstraction. Taçon's Tonal Poem illustrated the article.

In 1945, the Taçons moved to Toronto when Percy Taçon was appointed as Head of the Art Department of the Ontario College of Education. Edna Taçon had her first solo exhibition in New York in October 1946. According to Zemans, Burrell, and Hunter, this exhibit marked a change in direction in her work towards a more expressionistic approach. Her paintings nevertheless remained indebted to Kandinsky's "theory of the spiritual nature of art."

During her time in Toronto, Taçon taught design and art history at Toronto Western Technical School. Divorcing Percy Taçon, remarrying Paul Arnold, and divorcing again, Taçon did not exhibit publicly again after 1949 although she continued to paint. Her work can be found in the collections of the Guggenheim Museum, the Art Gallery of Ontario, and the Robert McLaughlin Gallery, Oshawa. Edna Jeanette Taçon died in New York in 1980.

From February 28–August 30, 2026, the Art Gallery of Ontario (AGO) exhibited Edna Taçon: Verve & Decorum, which features more than 25 paintings, watercolors and collages, from the 1940s. It is the first exhibition of her work in 40 years. Her archive is stored at The Edward P. Taylor Library & Archive at the AGO.

== Awards ==
- Solomom R. Guggenheim Foundation Scholarship, 1941
