= Tobi Bruce =

Canadian curator (born 1965)

- Born: 1965 (age 60–61); Montreal, Canada
- Education: Honours BA in art history from Queen's University, Kingston (1989); MA in Canadian art history from Carleton University, Ottawa (1999)
- Occupation: Art curator

Tobi Bruce (born 1965) has been the Director of Exhibitions and Collections and Senior Curator at the Art Gallery of Hamilton since 2015. She is a Canadian art historian who places curatorial collaboration at the centre of her practice.

== Career ==
Bruce was born and grew up in Montreal. She received her Honours BA in Art History from Queen's University, Kingston (1989) and her MA in Canadian Art History from Carleton University, Ottawa (1999). From 1991 to 1992, she served as Acting Registrar of the Agnes Etherington Art Centre, Queen's University, then went to the Art Gallery of Hamilton (AGH), as Registrar in 1993. She was appointed Curator of Historical Art in 1999 and in 2015, Director of Exhibitions and Collections.

She has focused on Canadian historical art in exhibitions ranging from biography with her show of the Canadian artist Harriet Ford (2001) to her exhibition and publication on the history of the Art Gallery of Hamilton's historical Canadian collection Lasting Impressions: celebrated works from the Art Gallery of Hamilton (2005) which she co-authored to her co-curated exhibition William Kurelek: The Messenger (2011) which was the first retrospective of his art in a quarter century and the largest ever mounted. In the same year, she also co-curated The French Connection: Canadians at the Paris Salons, 1880–1900.

In 2014, after three years of research and two trips to Sweden and France, she curated her major retrospective and co-authored the book Into the Light: The Paintings of William Blair Bruce (1859–1906), to examine the artist from different viewpoints (indigenous included) to achieve diversity. In 2015, she co-curated The Artist Herself: Self-Portraits by historical Canadian women artists (2015) with Alicia Boutilier of the Agnes Etherington Art Centre. This exhibition expanded the genre's definition by using not only the human face but other art forms to explore self-representation. Her 2021 exhibition Tom Thomson: The Art of Authentication co-curated and authored again with Boutilier, established criteria to authenticate a work of art, taking as its focus the work of Tom Thomson and exhibiting possible Thomsons and known fakes to illustrate the help authentication can provide. The exhibition was called a "rewarding experience" as an examination of authentication and forgery in art, using Tom Thomson as case in point. The show was rated one of the best exhibitions of the season by the Art Institute of Canada because it gave insight into the extensive problem-solving that museum professionals undertake in tracing authenticity.

Bruce has contributed a chapter to Canada and Impressionism: New Horizons at the National Gallery of Canada (2019) and also has written entries to such exhibitions as Embracing Canada: Landscapes from Krieghoff to the Group of Seven, Vancouver Art Gallery (2015) and Uninvited, Canadian Women Artists in the Modern Movement, McMichael Canadian Art Collection (2021). Her lectures on Canadian art include one on "Canadian Art-Making and Making Art Exhibitions" to a panel of Archivists, Librarians and Curators at the Art Libraries Society of North America 40th Annual Conference, Toronto (2012) and "On Prudence Heward" in 2021. She has been an adjunct lecturer in Canadian art history at McMaster University, Hamilton, since 2016 and has served on the board of trustees, Association of Art Museum Curators (2017–2020; 2020–2022).
