= Canadian Handicrafts Guild =

- Successor: La Guilde (Canadian Guild of Crafts)
- Formation: 1906
- Founder: Mary Martha Phillips and Mary Alice Peck
- Dissolved: 1974
- Type: Non-profit association
- Legal status: Historical
- Purpose: Support handicrafts
- Headquarters: Montreal
- Location: Montreal
- Region served: Canada
- Official language: English, French
- Website: laguilde.com

The Canadian Handicrafts Guild (now known as La Guilde) was an association of Canadians involved in handicrafts that was founded in Montreal in 1906. At first the goal was to preserve and market traditional home crafts that were seen as being at risk of dying out. Demand for high quality products and a shift towards more "professional" craftspeople and modern designs placed stress on the organization. In 1967 the provincial branches became autonomous, and subsequently evolved separately. At the national level the Guild was merged with the Canadian Craftsman's Association in 1974 to form the Canadian Crafts Council, now the Canadian Crafts Federation.

== Origins ==
The Montreal branch of the Women's Art Association of Canada (WAAC) was founded in 1894 by Mary Martha Phillips and Mary Alice Peck. The Montreal branch held major exhibits of applied arts in 1900 and 1902, and in June 1902 opened a store, Our Handicrafts Shop. The Montreal WAAC was a precursor of the Canadian Handicrafts Guild. The same women were involved in both organizations. The crafts committee of the Montreal branch broke away from the WAAC in 1905, becoming the Canadian Handicrafts Guild. (Note: In 1907 the Montreal branch of the WAAC also broke away and formed the independent Women's Art Society of Montreal. The Montreal society remains active today.)

The Handicrafts Guild, led by Alice Peck and May Phillips, was incorporated in 1906. It was a federal non-profit organization, with the Governor General Albert Grey and Alice, Countess Grey as patrons. The objectives of the Guild were to support and encourage crafts in Canada. The Guild was modeled on an idealized view of the medieval guild, and was dedicated to preserving traditional ethnic crafts, seen to be at risk of dying out. It encouraged craftspeople to work together collectively to meet market needs, selling their goods anonymously.

== History ==
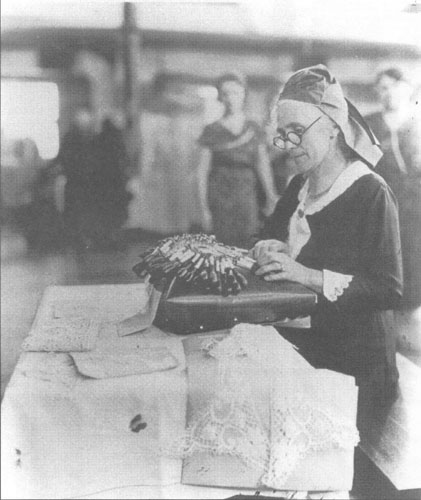
Mme. Soulier, bobbin lace maker at the Canadian Handicraft Exhibition at the Manitoba Agricultural College, Fort Garry (June 1933)

=== Early years ===
The guild set up a reference library in 1909. That year Alice Peck proposed that the Guild should start a permanent collection holding some of the best handwork. The guild sold handicrafts at its shop and through agencies. It awarded prizes at annual competitions and ran educational programs, including classes for immigrant children and a weaving school. By 1911 the Guild was very active across Canada and abroad. From 1905 to 1935 the guild exhibited the work of the First Nations at what is now the Montreal Museum of Fine Arts. In the 1930s the guild opened branch offices in each province. The Manitoba branch was formed in January 1928 by a group of over 30 women at a meeting in Winnipeg, led by Lady Constance Nanton. (Note: Lady Constance Nanton, born Ethel Constance Clark, was the wife of Augustus Meredith Nanton (1860–1925), a prominent Winnipeg businessman.) The organization became interested in education, and as the shop grew they also placed more emphasis on quality of design and workmanship.

=== 1930s ===
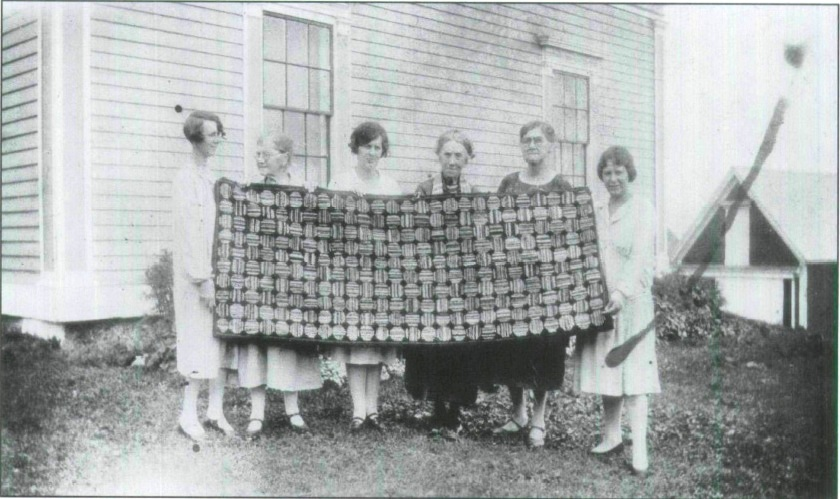
Women's Institute, Lower Granville. Annapolis County, Nova Scotia, displaying a hooked rug c. 1930

In May 1932 the Canadian Handicrafts League (the Guild) announced that the Handicrafts Association of Canada, based in Toronto, had become affiliated with the Montreal-based organization. That year the Handicrafts League obtained the use of one third of the Canadian National Exhibition in Toronto for a large display of handicrafts from across Canada. It was hoped that farmers and country people suffering from the Great Depression would benefit from the League's support. In July 1932 the local paper in Medicine Hat, Alberta, reported that "... there seems to be some doubt about just how many handicraft organizations there are in the country, I think our local Canadian Handicraft Guild must be connected with the Handicrafts Association of Canada Incorporated." The writer described the Handicrafts Association's aim as helping to sell the products of Canadian craftsmen and people making crafts for occupational therapy, such as disabled soldiers. The association had a shop in downtown Toronto stocked with an array of products from the east, but so far with no western crafts.

In May 1933 it was announced that the Canadian Handicrafts Guild had received letters of support from leaders and organizations across the country for their planned exhibition in Montreal for the end of October. It was planned to bring Quebec handicraft workers from their farms to Montreal to demonstrate their work. Some would be seeing the city for the first time. Participating organization included the Guild's branches in Alberta, British Columbia, Manitoba and Prince Edward Island, the Art Association of Montreal, the Women's Art Society, Montreal, and Union Catholique des Cultivateurs, the Handicrafts Association of Canada of Toronto and the Mount Allison Handicrafts Guild of Sackville, New Brunswick. Products exhibited would include homespuns, tweed from a blend of angora and sheep's wool, Indian basketwork, hooked rugs, quilt, blankets and furniture.

Lt.-Col. Wilfrid Bovey was re-appointed president of the guild for 1934. He reported on a successful year in 1933, with high attendance at exhibitions in Edmonton (125,000), Winnipeg (50,000) and Montreal (32,000). Other exhibitions had been held in Toronto, Charlottetown and Banff. Two new branches had been formed, one in Prince Edward Island and the other in the Ottawa Valley. Cape Breton Home Industries, founded by Mrs. Alexander Graham Bell, and the Mabel Hubbard Club of Montreal were now associated with the guild. Finances were in good shape, despite a drop in sales volumes. In 1936 the newly formed Canadian Guild of Potters decided to join the Handicrafts guild. That year the Handicrafts Guild assigned its assets and liabilities to a new branch in Quebec, which assumed a leading role among the other guilds across the country. In 1937 the Guild participated in the international Art, Craft and Science exhibition in Paris, France.

=== Post-war ===
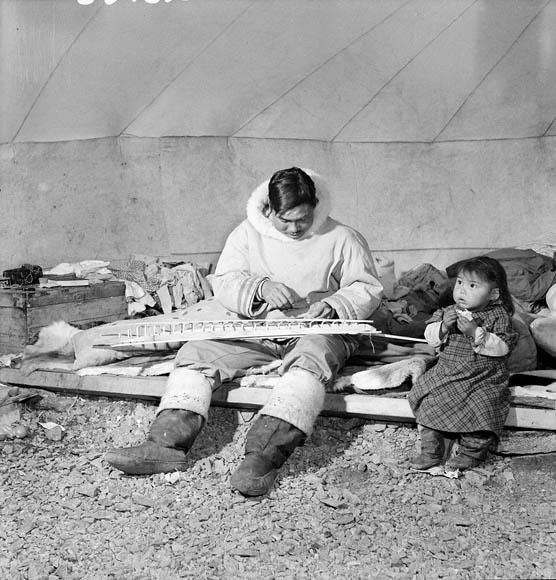
Solomonie, watched by his daughter Annie, working on a model kayak for the Canadian Handicrafts Guild (July 1951)

In the early 1950s the Guild began to help the Inuit of Port Harrison, Quebec, to sell their arts and crafts. Craft organizations in the 1950s changed focus from traditional to modern art, and acquired a more professional image. The artists now began to be recognized as individuals, in contrast to the earlier collective identity. By the 1960s the Guild was struggling to define its direction. It had originally been concerned with home arts, but neglected the growing numbers of fine craftsmen. The Montreal branch realized that by failing to enforce quality standards it had lost standing with the latter group. Their 1963 exhibition was therefore strictly juried. In 1967 the national association and all the branch offices became autonomous.

== Successor organizations ==
The Canadian Craftsman's Association was formed as an alternative national craft organization after the 1964 First World Congress of Craftsmen. In 1974 the Canadian Handicrafts Guild merged with the Canadian Craftsman's Association to form the Canadian Crafts Council (CCC), based in Ottawa. At first the CCC was a federation of provincial crafts councils. Later it accepted membership from other crafts organizations. In 1996 the council began accepting craftspeople as individual members. However, that year the Federal government stopped funding and the council had to close its offices and lay off its staff. It continued as a legal entity, run by volunteers, but had no resources to run programs. In May 1998 the CCC was transformed into a national crafts network, the Canadian Crafts Federation / Fédération canadienne des métiers d'art. The members are the ten provincial crafts councils.

The Quebec branch became the Canadian Guild of Crafts Quebec. It is now called simply the Canadian Guild of Crafts.

In 2014 the Ontario Crafts Council rebranded itself as Crafts Ontario.

The Craftsmen's Association of British Columbia, later renamed the Crafts Council of British Columbia, was initially based in the Dominion Building in downtown Vancouver. It moved to Cartwright Street in Granville Island in December 1979 with federal government funding.
