= Gordon Webber (artist) =

Canadian artist (1909–1965)

- Born: Gordon McKinley Webber; March 12, 1909; Sault Ste. Marie, Ontario, Canada
- Died: November 17, 1965 (aged 56); Montreal, Quebec
- Education: Ontario College of Art, Toronto, with Arthur Lismer (1924–1927); Art Students League, New York; School of Design, Chicago with László Moholy-Nagy (1937); Bachelor of Design, School of Design in Chicago (1942); Teachers Course, Art Gallery of Toronto (1942)
- Elected: Canadian Group of Painters (1937)

Gordon Webber (March 12, 1909 – November 17, 1965) was a multimedia pioneer of modernism in Canada. He was also an educator.

== Career ==
Gordon Webber was born in Sault Ste. Marie, Ontario, the eldest of five children. He was introduced to fine art by his mother. In 1924, he enrolled at the Ontario College of Art, where he studied with teachers who included Arthur Lismer, J.E.H. MacDonald and Emanuel Hahn. In protest against the resignation of Lismer as vice-principal in 1927, Webber and a group of other artists including Isabel McLaughlin founded the Art Students' League (1927–1930) at which prominent Toronto artists such as Lawren S. Harris were invited to give critiques.

Webber was recognized as a talented student since 1930 when he was invited to show with the Group of Seven. In the early 1930s, Webber began teaching with Lismer at the Art Gallery of Toronto. During these years, he was a figurative artist. In 1934, he travelled to Mexico to attend a Progressive Education Association Conference, met Mexican artists and studied the local murals. Back at home, Webber continued to teach at the Children's Art Centre of Toronto, helped found the Picture Loan Society in Toronto in 1936, and exhibited his work to critical approval.

In 1937, Webber enrolled at the New Bauhaus School of Design in Chicago where he studied with László Moholy-Nagy. His contact with Moholy-Nagy was critical for him: he became much more experimental. His work changed: he became an abstract painter, interested in art photography and design, whether applied to graphics, stage or costume. In 1939, Webber accompanied Moholy-Nagy to California to teach a course at Mills College in Oakland, California.

In 1940, Lismer invited Webber to join the School of Art and Design at the Montreal Museum of Fine Arts (MMFA). In 1942, Webber graduated from the School of Design in Chicago with a Bachelor of Design degree. During his studies in Chicago, Webber exhibited his abstract work in Canada to mixed reviews. In 1942, he took the Teachers Course at the Art Gallery of Toronto (1942).

From 1942 to 1953, Webber taught architectural drawing at the School of Architecture, McGill University in Montreal part-time, then in 1953 was appointed assistant professor. He also continued to teach at the MMFA where he had students such as Guido Molinari and Claude Tousignant. (Tousignant recalls Webber introducing him to abstract expressionism in 1950, an experience which deeply moved him.) In the summer of 1950, he taught design, drawing, and painting at the summer school of the University of British Columbia as well. During these years, Webber experimented with photography and film, drawing directly on 35 mm film stock having learned the technique through Norman McLaren at the National Film Board of Canada studios in Montreal.

In the late 1940s and the early 1950s, Webber choreographed two ballets. He was involved with the design of costumes and sets for theatrical presentations at McGill and many commissions integrating art and architecture, executing works such as an exterior mural and interior mobile for the Town of Mount Royal Post Office, and a relief sculpture for the McConnell Engineering Building at McGill. Webber also sought to preserve historic Canadian architecture.

== Selected solo exhibitions ==
In 1936 and 1937, Webber held an exhibition of Paintings and Drawings: "Mexican Impressions" at Mellors Gallery, Toronto. In 1936 and 1937, having helped found the Picture Loan Society in Toronto, he held two exhibitions there. In 1949, he had a show at the School of Architecture, McGill University, Montreal, and in 1959, an exhibition of his paintings was held at the Montreal Museum of Fine Arts. In 2000, a posthumous show was organized by the Art Gallery of Algoma, Sault Ste. Marie, Ontario.

== Selected group exhibitions ==
In 1928, he participated in an Art Students' League Exhibition, Hart House, University of Toronto, Toronto. Webber showed mainly with the Canadian Group of Painters (1935–1946) but he also showed with the Ontario Society of Artists (1930–1935), with the Royal Canadian Academy of Arts (1934 and 1936), with the Canadian Society of Painters in Water Colour in Toronto (1934–1936) and in the Art Association of Montreal Spring Show (1942–1955). In 1943, a show of Edna Taçon, Jessie Faunt, Michael Forster, and Webber, was held at the Art Gallery of Toronto, Toronto. In 1951, his work was included in Painters Portraits, Montreal Museum of Fine Arts, Montreal and in 1959, in the Exposition Helmut Gransow et Gordon Webber, Galerie Norton and Montreal Museum of Fine Arts, Montreal. In 1994, his work was included in Origins of Abstraction in Canada: Modernist Pioneers, Robert McLaughlin Gallery, Oshawa.

== Selected awards ==
- Ontario College of Art Fellowship (1924–1927);
- Carnegie Fellowship, Chicago School of Design (1938–1942)
- Museum of Modern Art, New York, prize (1941)

== Selected public collections ==
- Auckland Art Gallery, Auckland, New Zealand;
- Glasgow Art Gallery and Museum Glasgow, Scotland;
- Art Gallery of Ontario, Toronto, ON;
- Justina M. Barnicke Gallery, Art Museum, University of Toronto, ON;
- Montreal Museum of Fine Arts, Montreal, QC;
- National Gallery of Canada, Ottawa, ON;
- Robert McLaughlin Gallery, Oshawa, ON

== Selected memberships ==
- Canadian Group of Painters (1937);
- Canadian Federation of Artists (1943);
- Executive Officer, Canadian Federation of Artists (1944);
- President, Canadian Group of Painters, Montreal Chapter, (Eastern Group of Painters) (1959–1969);
- Association of Canadian Industrial Designers Member;
- L'Association des artistes non-figuratifs de Montréal

== Personal life ==
Born with spina bifida, he spent much of his youth in medical care. In 1929, Dr. Frederick Banting took an interest in his disability. Following consultation with the Head Surgeon of the Medical School at the University of Toronto, Webber's lame leg was amputated just above the knee. He was fitted with a wooden leg after the surgery, and acquired new mobility. He died of a heart attack in Montreal in 1959, after making four speeches in the campaign to save an historic house marked for demolition in Perth, Ontario. As Robert Ayre wrote in "McGill Ceremony Will Honor Gordon Webber", in the Montreal Star, November 19, 1965, Gordon Webber was a radiant spirit.
