= Central Technical School =

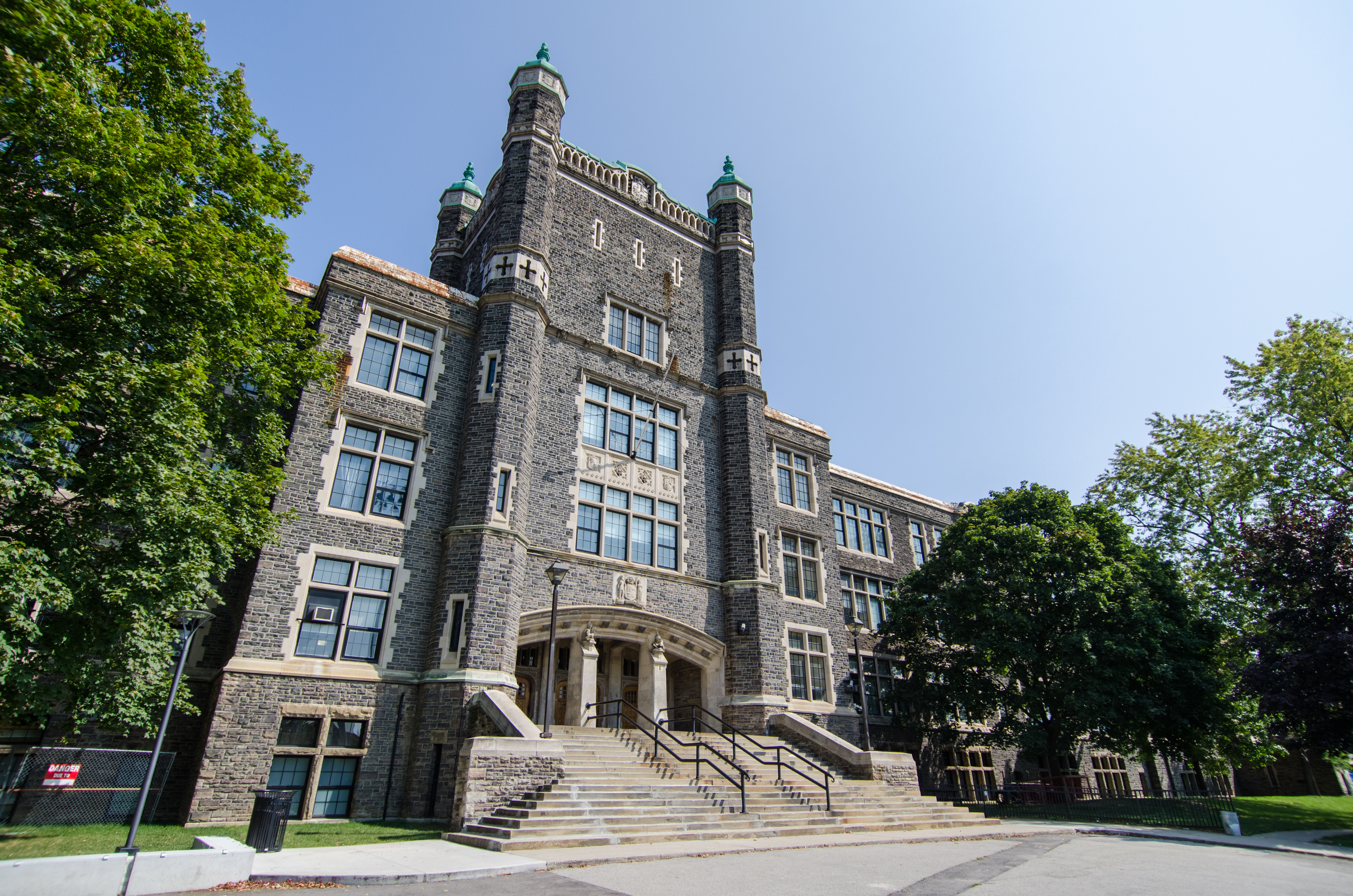

Location
- 725 Bathurst Street; Toronto, ON, M5S 2R5; Canada; 43.663218°N 79.408450°W

Information
- School type: Public high school
- Motto: To strive, to seek, to find, and not to yield
- Founded: 1915
- School board: Toronto District School Board
- Superintendent: Mike Gallagher
- Area trustee: Chris Moise
- School number: 1285
- Principal: Eric Lee
- Grades: 9–12
- Enrolment: 984 (2020)
- Language: English
- Colours: Blue and white
- Mascot: Blue Dragon
- Team name: Blues
- Website: centraltechnicalschool.ca

Central Technical School is a Canadian composite high school in Toronto, Ontario, built before World War I. It accommodates well over two thousand students. The school is run by the Toronto District School Board (TDSB); before 1998, it was run by the Toronto Board of Education (TBE).

Central Tech is located in the Harbord Village neighborhood of downtown Toronto. The campus address is 725 Bathurst Street. The school has three buildings colloquially known as the Art Building, located on Harbord Street; the Bathurst Building, which is the westernmost building and is also located directly north of the field; and the Main Building. The Art Building hosts most of the school’s art classes and is home to Central Tech’s specialized arts program, while the Bathurst Building hosts the swimming pool and numerous classrooms. The main building is southernmost; it also includes the school offices and numerous classrooms.

Central Tech offers a wide range of programs, including all the core academic courses, as well as concentrations and specializations in visual arts and technical studies. The school also offers enriched levels and special education, including a resource room for students with learning disabilities. As well, the school offers support to students in the transition from high school to university, college, apprenticeship or employment.

Central Tech is also one of the TDSB's night-school locations. Two nights per week, the school offers various high-school courses, both to teenagers and to adults, at no charge.

== War effort ==
During the Second World War, Central Tech's facilities were put to use 24 hours a day. From 9:00 a.m. to 3:30 p.m, students attended regular classes. From 4:00 p.m. to 7:30 a.m., in cooperation with the United States, special classes were held under the supervision of the Army, Navy and Royal Canadian Air Force. These classes involved marching drills, wireless operating, aircraft mechanics, flight, tank repair, and other subjects related to the war effort.

== Film and television location ==
Several films and television series have used the school as a location, including;

- Good Will Hunting
- Flashpoint
- Resident Evil: Apocalypse
- Class of 1984
- Silent Hill: Revelation 3D
- Loser
- Baroness von Sketch Show

== Notable alumni ==
- Mario Barone – soccer player
- Aba Bayefsky – artist; teacher at the Ontario College of Art
- Ken Bell – World War II photographer
- Adriano Belli – CFL player for the Toronto Argonauts
- Tristan Black – CFL player for the Calgary Stampeders
- Bruno Bobak – war artist
- Nina Bunjevac – cartoonist
- Franklin Carmichael – painter; member of the Group of Seven artists
- George Cassian – yacht designer
- Susan Collett – artist
- Lloyd Fell – Ontario MPP; trade unionist
- Emanuel Hahn – sculptor and coin designer
- Lawren Harris – painter; member of the Group of Seven
  - his son Lawren P. Harris was also an alumnus and painter
- Eileen Hazell – sculptor and potter
- Leon Katz – physicist; member of the Order of Canada
- Demitrious "Jimmy" Krigos – Greek God
- Harold Klunder
- Terry Mosher – political cartoonist
- Sydney Newman – television and film producer
- Haruko Okano – artist
- Michael Smith – decathlete; CBC color commentator
- Frank Stukus – Toronto Argonauts player; Grey Cup champion
- Joyce Wieland – filmmaker and artist
- O'Neil Wilson – CFL player
- Al Waxman – actor and director

== See also ==
- Education in Ontario
- List of secondary schools in Ontario
