= Paraskeva Clark =

Canadian painter (1898–1986)

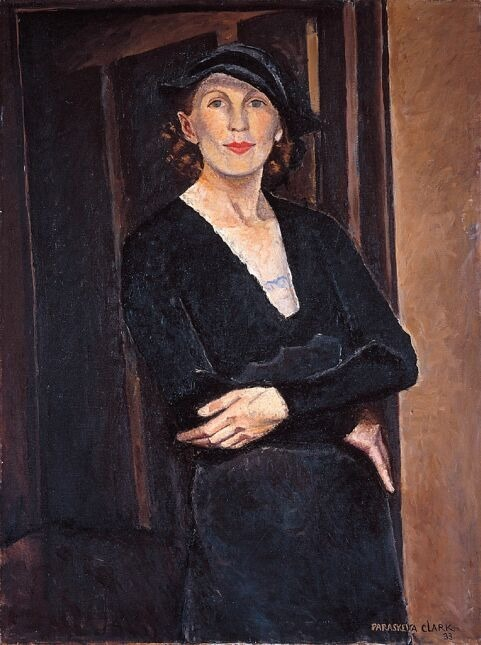
- Self-portrait painted by Paraskeva Clark in 1933, in the National Gallery of Canada's collection
- Born: October 28, 1898; St. Petersburg, Russia
- Died: August 10, 1986 (aged 87)
- Known for: Painter
- Notable work: Petroushka

Paraskeva Clark RCA (October 28, 1898 – August 10, 1986) was a Russian and Canadian painter. who believed that "an artist must act as a witness to class struggle and other societal issues." She was a member of the Canadian Group of Painters, the Canadian Society of Painters in Water Colour, Canadian Society of Graphic Art, the Ontario Society of Artists, and the Royal Canadian Academy (1966). Much of her art now is in the National Gallery of Canada and the Art Gallery of Ontario.

== Early life ==
Clark was born Paraskeva Avdeyevna Plistik in St. Petersburg, Russia, the first daughter of Avdey Plistik and Olga Fedorevna. She was the eldest of the couple's three children and was given four years more schooling than most girls of the time. Her extended education can be attributed to both her father who instilled in her his enjoyment of books and learning and to her mother who made artificial flowers to supplement the family's income. After graduating school in 1914, Clark worked as a clerk in a shoe factory where her father had been previously employed before owning his own grocery store. Clark's mother died of pneumonia in when Clark was 17, a year after her youngest child had graduated.

Enjoying the theatre as a young woman, Clark was initially interested in acting but deterred by the financial expense of training. After encouragement from her coworker Elza Brahmin, Clark attended evening classes at the Petrograd Academy of Fine Arts from 1916 into 1918, at which time the school was closed while changes were made in the art-education program after the October 1917 revolution. The school was reopened as the tuition-free Free Art Studios, and Clark was admitted and given a stipend. She left in 1921 and was recruited among other students to paint sets for theatres. It was in this work that she met Oreste Allegri Jr., an Italian scene painter whom she would marry in 1922. In March of the following year they had a son, Benedict, and they made plans to emigrate to France. Oreste drowned in the summer of 1923 before their plans could be carried out, and Clark and her son Benedict left for the Allegri family home in Paris by themselves in the fall. The Allegris were well connected in the art world, and Clark met many artists through them – including Pablo Picasso. She had little opportunity for her own art, while caring for her son and doing domestic work for her in-laws; despite this she created Memories of Leningrad in 1923: Mother and Child in 1924, and a self-portrait in 1925.

In 1929, six-year-old Benedict was sent to a boarding school during week days and Clark took a job outside of her in-laws home, in an interior design shop. Here, she met her second husband, the Canadian accountant Philip Clark. Clark was visiting Europe for three months at the time, and the two kept in touch until he visited her again in 1931, at which point they decided to marry – and did so in London on June 9, 1931. After the wedding, Clark and Benedict travelled with Philip to their new home in Toronto where the family welcomed a new son, Clive, in June 1933.

== Artistic influences ==
In 1916, Clark discovered that the landscape painter Savely Zeydenberg's studio was on the same streetcar line as the shoe factory where she worked; she began to take art night classes there. Zeydenberg taught figure drawing as well as still life and for months, Clark, as a beginning student, drew in charcoal from plaster heads, while the advanced students worked from a model. She immersed herself in conversations with her peers about art styles, including impressionism, post impressionism, cubism and the artists who were central to those movements.

Vasily Shukhayev was a relatively unknown painter and set designer whose students practiced life drawing and painting. The fallout from the Revolution brought about a great upheaval in all the arts. Clark was familiar with the many prominent artists of the time, including Vladimir Tatlin, who believed that they were creating a revolutionary art – Cubism and Futurism – for the new regime.

Kuzma Petrov-Vodkin was a humanist painter who integrated the European influences of Matisse and Cézanne, with his personal Russian experience. He was a thinker, an intellectual, and from him Clark gained some sense of depth of an intellectual, thoughtful life. Clark was interested in colour and still life, to which Petrov-Vodkin brought his theories of space, and studied his way of depicting a visual perspective that was not an artificial architectural construction. It was from Petrov-Vodkin that Clark learned the technique of spherical perspective in which figures and objects are distorted from their perpendicular axis to produce dynamic moment.

In years to come, Clark drew on her teacher's concept of tilting the usual verticals and horizontals, she employs this technique in her 1947 painting Essentials of Life. Petrov-Vodkin passed on to Clarke his knowledge of Cézanne's techniques in utilizing the shifting axes in a picture.

For her Self Portrait of 1933, Clark borrows from Petrov-Vodkin's compositional methods, but made the decision to build her self-portrait around the colour black, creating her own aesthetic and moving away from the style of her teacher, who discouraged his students from using black. The painting is unified by the tilt of the figure and the slanted architectural elements, reflecting Petrov-Vodkin's influence. Also in Self Portrait, Clark employs the techniques she learned from her teacher—and utilized framing elements like doors, to structure her paintings; she is shown smiling confidently while leaning against a door, and her strong facial features are accentuated by the employment of minimal colour and by the understated elegance of her dress.

In Clark's work, critics have noted two influences: Cézanne and to a lesser extent Picasso; Cézanne because Clark used colour to define form; Picasso, for the way she organized her portraits and still life. The tilt of the surfaces and the placement of the objects show she understood Picasso as she put him together with Petrov-Vodkin to turn out her own Paraskeva Clark still-lifes. Her painting Pink Cloud, 1937 in the National Gallery of Canada collection was cited as an example of her delicate sense of colour. Cézanne's influence is especially clear in her 1939 painting In the Woods. The painting's Cézannesque treatment of the forest floor shows the artist's awareness of European trends as well as her Russian training under Petrov-Vodkin.

Clark's 1933 paintings Self Portrait and Portrait of Philip are her first major works that deal with the composition of the artwork, in which the subject is integrated in time, space and architecture. In terms of configuration she takes inspiration from Cézanne – the balancing of form, his structured and measured employment of the paint on the canvas. In Portrait of Philip for example, the artist creates a complex but very balanced pattern of parallel and perpendicular lines within the stable square of the canvas, containing and supporting the cool, appraising, sartorial figure of her husband. Space is constructed in such a way that the spectator looks down into the picture, and down at the figure of Philip in the deep, perspectively distorted chair, yet meets the glance of the man eyes to eye.

== Petroushka ==
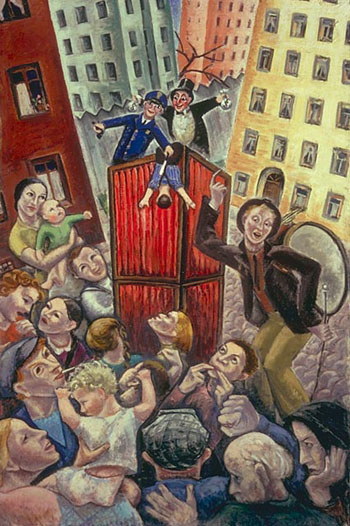
Petroushka, 1937 oil on canvas, 122.4 x 81.9 cm

In Petroushka, Clark creates a seemingly innocent scene of street entertainers; it was painted as an outranged response to newspaper reports of the killing of five striking steelworkers by Chicago police in the summer of 1937. She chose to adapt the story of Petrushka (the Peter puppet and symbol of suffering humanity within Russian tradition) to a North American context.

Clark spoke out about the role and responsibility of the artist; she declared:

"Those who give their lives, their knowledge and their time to social struggle have the right to expect great help from the artist. And I cannot imagine a more inspiring role than that which the artist is asked to play for the defence and advancement of civilization".

She urged Canadian artists to "Come Out From Behind the Pre-Cambrian Shield" as she titled an article she wrote in 1937 in "New Frontier".

== Political influences ==
Clark's early financial challenges in her pursuit of the arts, because of her working class Russian parents and the revolution in her home country, contributed to her belief in the responsibility of artists to depict class struggle and other social issues in their work. She criticized the work of those such as the Group of Seven which lacked reference to real world issues; she showed more reverence for her peers who were dedicated to creating "socially conscious Canadian art", including Pegi Nicol MacLeod, art editor of the Canadian Forum from 1935–1936, who introduced Clark to the noted anti-fascist Dr. Norman Bethune in 1936. Bethune and Clark had a brief affair; the relationship had an influence on the latter's politics. A socialist, a self-identified "red Russian" communist, and one of the few artists producing political art in Canada at the time, Clark at this point became active in the Committee to Aid Spanish Democracy. The Second World War left the artist concerned for her homeland, and she was quite active in support of Russia against the Nazi threat. In 1942, she sold some pieces of her art to donate the proceeds to the Canadian Aid to Russia Fund. She was also appointed by the National Gallery of Canada to record the activities of the Women's Divisions of the Armed Forces during World War II. Parachute Riggers (1947), for example, is a dramatic depiction of women rigging parachutes in a factory near the airbase at Trenton, Ontario. Clark's art from these times reflected her strong political attitude, Petroushka (1937) being the most widely recognised, though the political significance of the work is seen in other works, as in Pavlichenko and Her Comrades at the Toronto City Hall (1943), on which she affirmed her sympathies with the inscription naming the "heroic red army". Her work was to become one of the few politically influenced pieces to survive the era.

== Later life ==
Paraskeva Clark's eldest son Benedict was hospitalized and diagnosed with schizophrenia after a nervous episode in 1943, and she put her artistic career on hold temporarily; though even when she resumed painting a year later she struggled to balance the responsibilities of her family life with her artistic ambitions. From 1951 to 1956, Clark gave several large solo shows which were favourably received. Her son Clive was married in 1959 and gave her three grandchildren, which were "a source of great delight" for the artist. In a poor turn of events Benedict was again hospitalised because of his mental health 1957, and this impacted Clarks's production of art in a predictable manner. In 1965, after multiple rejections of her work, Clark resigned from the Ontario Society of Artists. Then in 1974, mother and son shared a show together during which the National Gallery of Canada purchased her piece Myself (1933). Many exhibitions of her work and new projects featuring her art came about in these later years of her life, including a 1982 film by the National Film Board of Canada, Portrait of the Artist as an Old Lady. Speaking of her art in 1974, Clark said

"I cannot complain, I have had a very good career, considering a great deal of my time has been spent on being a wife and a mother."

Philip Clark died in 1980, and after living for a time in a nursing home Paraskeva Clark suffered a stroke and died on August 10, 1986, at the age of 87.

== See also ==
- Canadian official war artists
- War artist
- Military art
