= Yvonne McKague Housser =

Canadian artist (1897–1996)

- Born: Muriel Yvonne McKague; August 4, 1897; Toronto, Canada
- Died: January 26, 1996 (aged 98); Toronto, Canada
- Known for: Painter
- Spouse: marriage to Frederick B. Housser in 1935. (Housser died in 1936.)

Yvonne McKague Housser, CM RCA (August 4, 1897– January 26, 1996) was a Modernist Canadian painter, and a teacher.

== Early life and education ==
Yvonne McKague was born in Toronto in 1897 to Hugh Henry McKague and Louise Elliott. She studied at the Ontario College of Art (OCA), Toronto, from 1913 to 1918, with George Agnew Reid, J. W. Beatty, William Cruikshank, Robert Holmes and Emanuel Hahn.

== Career ==
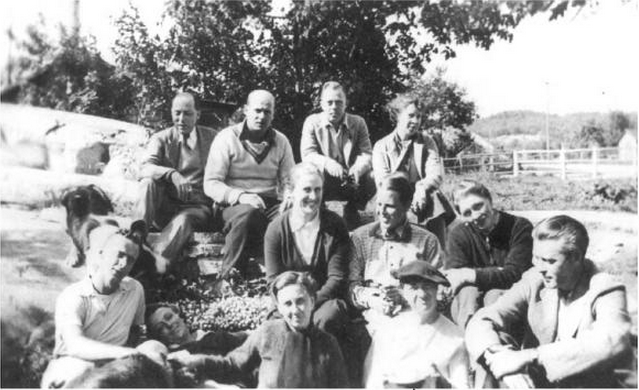
Whitefish Falls in 1936. Top row: Randolph Hewton, Mr. Whittall, Charles Comfort, Yvonne McKague Housser. Middle row: Isabel McLaughlin, Gordon Webber, Bennie Hewton. Bottom row: Hal Hayden, Audrey Taylor, Prudence Heward, Rody Kenny Courtice, Mr. Macdonald.

After one more year as post-graduate and assistant, Housser began teaching as assistant instructor at OCAD, then called OCA. In the 1920 OCA Prospectus, she and Edith Coombs were the only women listed on the teaching staff. In 1921–1922, Housser took a leave of absence to study in Paris, France, at the Académie de la Grande Chaumière, Académie Colarossi, and Académie Ranson.

In 1923, she first exhibited her work with the Royal Canadian Academy, and in 1924 with the Ontario Society of Artists of which became a member in 1928. From 1926, she showed her work in numerous solo and group shows in the Heliconian Club in Toronto, also in the Art Gallery of Toronto and in private galleries. The Robert McLaughlin Gallery in Oshawa held her retrospective in 1995 curated by Joan Murray.

McKague also was a founding member of the Canadian Group of Painters in 1933 (President, 1955–1956), and the Federation of Canadian Artists in 1941. She was made a full member of the Royal Canadian Academy of Arts in 1951. She retired from the Ontario College of Art in 1946 but went on to teach at the Doon School of Fine Art in Kitchener and at the Ryerson Polytechnical Institute in Toronto (now Toronto Metropolitan University) and elsewhere.

In 1954, she was one of eighteen Canadian artists commissioned by the Canadian Pacific Railway to paint a mural for the interior of one of the new Park cars entering service on the new Canadian transcontinental train. Each mural depicts a different national or provincial park; Housser's was Sibley Provincial Park. She was the only woman artist who was asked to do a mural.

She received the Order of Canada in 1984 and received the OCA's A. J. Casson Award for Distinguished Service in 1991.

== Group of Seven ==
Housser was invited to exhibit with the Group of Seven in 1928, 1930 and 1931. The group disbanded to form the country-wide Canadian Group of Painters in 1933, of which Housser was a founding member. In 1935 she married Frederick B. Housser, financial editor of the Toronto Star and author of A Canadian Art Movement: The Story of the Group of Seven, published in 1926. He is called the chief mythologizer of the Group by writers such as Sara Angel.

== Selected public collections ==
- Art Gallery of Ontario, Toronto
- National Gallery of Canada
- Art Gallery of Hamilton
- McMichael Canadian Art Collection
- Musée national des beaux-arts du Québec
- Robert McLaughlin Gallery, Oshawa

== Legacy ==
In 1998, Housser was one of the four artists in 4 Women Who Painted in the 1930s and 1940s, curated by Alicia Boutilier for the Carleton University Art Gallery, Ottawa.
