= George Pepper (artist) =

Canadian painter (1903–1962)

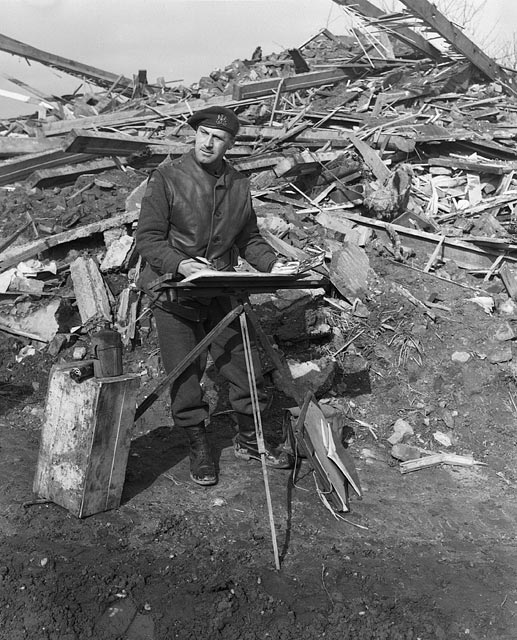
- Pepper in Kleve, Germany (1945)
- Born: George Douglas Pepper; February 25, 1903; Ottawa, Ontario
- Died: October 25, 1962 (aged 59); Toronto, Ontario
- Education: Ontario College of Art, Toronto (1920-1924); Académie de la Grande Chaumière, Paris (1924-1925)
- Known for: Landscape and figure painting
- Title: Official war artist (1943-1945)
- Spouse: Kathleen Daly (m. 1929)
- Elected: Royal Canadian Academy (1957); Canadian Group of Painters (1933 as founding member)

George Douglas Pepper RCA (February 25, 1903 – October 1, 1962) was a Canadian artist.

== Biography ==
Born in Ottawa, he studied with J.E.H. MacDonald and J. W. Beatty in Toronto, going on to study at the Académie de la Grande Chaumière in Paris. He was strongly influenced by the Group of Seven.

Pepper was an Official Second World War artist. He married artist Kathleen Daly in 1929. The couple visited the eastern Arctic in 1960 to study Inuit art. Pepper taught at the Ontario College of Art and the Banff School of Fine Arts. He was a founding member of the Canadian Group of Painters in 1933. In 1957, he was named to the Royal Canadian Academy of Arts. In 1954, he was one of eighteen Canadian artists commissioned by the Canadian Pacific Railway to paint a mural for the interior of one of the new Park cars entering service on the new Canadian transcontinental train. Each the murals depicted a different national or provincial park; Pepper's was Kootenay National Park.

His work is included in the public collections of the Canadian War Museum, the National Gallery of Canada, the Art Gallery of Ontario, the South African National Gallery and the Musée d'art contemporain de Baie-Saint-Paul.

Pepper died in Toronto at the age of 59.

== Signature ==
He signed his works: G Pepper

== Legacy ==
In 2025, the Confederation Centre Art Gallery, Charlottetown, P.E.I., organized Kathleen Daly Pepper and George Pepper: The Land and its People, curated by Pan Wendt.
