= Gordon Edward Pfeiffer =

Canadian landscape painter

Gordon Edward Pfeiffer (October 10, 1899 in Quebec City, Quebec – May 25, 1983 in Rosemère, Quebec) was a Canadian dyer and painter.

== Biography ==
=== Early life ===
Gordon Edward Pfeiffer was born in 1899 in Quebec City, Quebec. He was the child of Adolph Pfeiffer and Lily Wright. He attended Misses Bonhams' school, the Boys High School, Stanstead Wesleyan College and studied chemistry and economics at Harvard for two summers.

=== Later life ===
Pfeiffer married Dorothy Pfeiffer (born Douglas Young), a musician and former art critic for the Montreal Gazette, in June 1925 after a short courtship. It is unclear how many children Pfeiffer had, in Aimers's biography it is mentioned "Pfeiffer now had a family of six to support" with Gordon Jr., Douglas, Helen and Bruce being named in the book.

== Exhibitions ==
=== Spring Exhibitions at the Art Association of Montreal ===
Pfeiffer would exhibit his works Spring Exhibitions of the Art Association of Montreal (now Montreal Museum of Fine Arts) from 1928 to 1954. In McMann's catalogue of paintings exhibited by Pfeiffer his asking price for his works range from $50.00 for Pumpkin Season, 1933 ($882.64 in 2016 dollars adjusted for inflation) to $600.00 for Barley Harvest, 1942 ($8,765.52 in 2016 dollars). The last painting he would exhibit at the Spring Exhibitions, Summer, Baie des Chaleurs had an asking price of $300.00 ($2,704.26 in 2016 dollars).

=== Group exhibitions ===
- Royal Canadian Academy : 1928 to 1951.
- Galerie Pauline Johnson, Montreal : 1979 to 1981.

=== Solo exhibitions ===
- Chateau Frontenac, Quebec : 1930 to 1933, 1935 to 1937, 1948.
- Galerie Colbert, Montreal : 1977 to 1980.

== Notable patrons ==
Cotton Aimers' bibliography and catalogue raisonné Gordon E. Pfeiffer in collaboration with the painter himself documents a rich source of art dealers and patrons that have supported Pfeiffer throughout his career.

=== Corinne "Coco" Dupuis-Maillet ===
Dupuis-Maillet is described as a fellow-artist that helped Pfeiffer break into the Montreal artistic community as he moved to Westmount in the mid-Forties. She would take him under her wings and purchase dozens of his paintings and make the introductions he needed to get noticed.

=== Max Stern (Dominion Gallery of Fine Art) ===
Dr. Max Stern of the landmark Dominion Gallery of Fine Art (1941–2000) in Montreal was one Pfeiffer's earliest supporters during the phase of his life when he started painting landscapes. In the Max Stern Collection, a collection of items bequested at Dr. Stern's death to a joint collaborative effort between Concordia University and McGill University is a copy of Pfeiffer's biography and catalogue raisonné entitled Gordon E. Pfeiffer by Cotton Aimers. It contained a business card laid in of Dr. W. M. Pfeiffer. It is unclear what relation Dr. W. M. Pfeiffer had to Gordon Pfeiffer.

=== Major Institutions and Corporations ===
Cotton Aimers documents that as Pfeiffer established himself as an artist in the Sixties, large corporations such as Hydro-Québec, Industrial Acceptance Corporation, Kilborn Engineering (now a part of SNC-Lavalin) and Molson Brewery (now Molson-Coors) started acquiring his works for their boardrooms. Andrew Sidney Dawes purchased ten of his paintings and presented them to McGill University. The Montreal Museum of Fine Arts also owns one of his paintings.

=== Other notable patrons ===
- Jeannine Bombardier, daughter of Bombardier Inc. founder Joseph-Armand Bombardier, is listed as acquiring "Les Eaux Mortes, 1956".
- Donald S. Bartlett, Andrew Sidney Dawes, and E. Dzieduszycki are listed as having acquired multiple paintings of Pfeiffer.

=== Other notable art galleries ===
- Art dealer William Robinson Watson of Watson Art Galleries (1911–1958) was one of Pfeiffer's earliest patrons. He would sell his artwork at his gallery and in Aimers' catalogue raisonné list one of Pfeiffer's earlier works in his private collection at the time of publishing.
- Walter Klinkhoff Gallery (now Alan Klinkhoff Gallery)
- Continental galleries
- Scotts Art Gallery
- Eaton's Fine Art Gallery
- Galerie Colbert
- Continental Gallery
