= Louis Temporale =

Canadian artist (1909–1994)

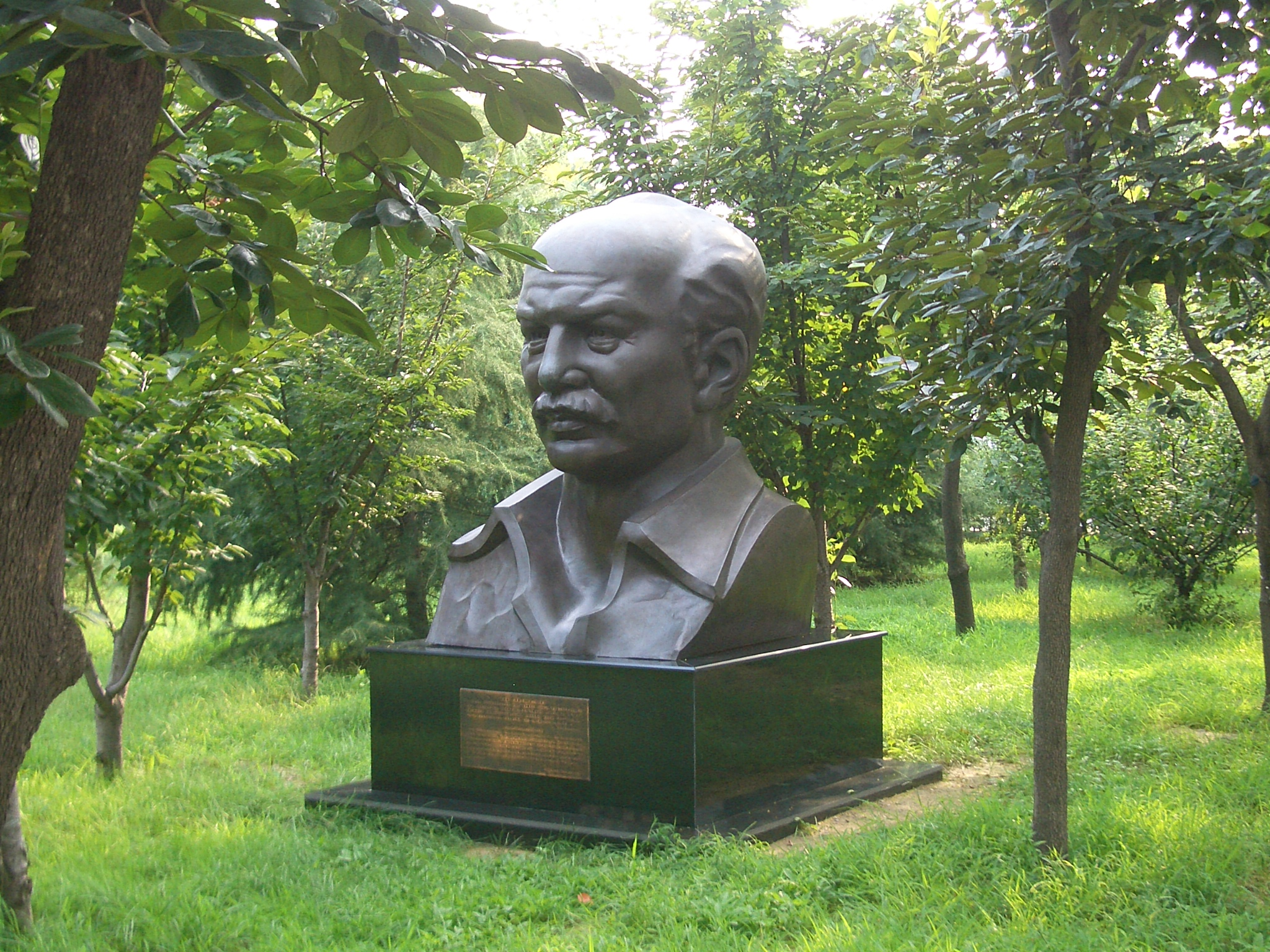
- Statue of Bethune at Wanping Fortress, Beijing
- Born: Louis Luigi Temporale; October 27, 1909; Maiano, Italy
- Died: May 22, 1994 (aged 84); Port Credit, Mississauga
- Education: State School of Design in Maiano, Italy; with Giuseppe Del Fabro in the town of Saint Daniele, Italy; Central Technical School, Toronto with Elizabeth Wyn Wood; Ontario College of Art, Toronto with Emanuel Hahn (late 1920s)

Louis Temporale, OOnt RCA (October 27, 1909 – May 22, 1994) was an Italian–born Canadian sculptor.

== Career ==
Louis Temporale was born in Maiano (now Fiesole), Fruili province, Italy. He began his artistic studies at the age of 14 at the State School of Design in his hometown. He later studied sculpture with Giuseppe Del Fabro in the town of Saint Daniele. He emigrated to Canada in 1927, settling in Toronto. He then studied sculpture with Elizabeth Wyn Wood at the Central Technical School and Emanuel Hahn at the Ontario College of Art. In 1929, Temporale and his brother, Peter, purchased an old ice house in Port Credit, a neighborhood in Mississauga, Ontario, and established the family business of Canadian Art Memorials Limited which delivered a wide range of sculpture, among them, cemetery gravestones. He lived in Port Credit for 60 years, and died there.

Temporale worked largely in granite, limestone, and marble, and his carvings ranged from three-dimensional sculpture, to two-dimensional sculptural reliefs. He was best known for the high quality of his stone relief carving on numerous post offices, banks, bridges, educational institutions and hospitals in Hamilton and Toronto. In Toronto, he created the old Bank of Montreal building, the Crown Life Building on Bloor, and elsewhere. In 1938–1939, he was commissioned to create a 13-panel limestone bas relief carvings depicting Communications & Transportation on the side of the new Toronto Postal Delivery Building (which is now the Scotiabank Arena). He also created other carvings utilized in the facade of the building. In Hamilton, he created the stone carving at the Hamilton Port Authority, including the Indian head prow; the stone ornamentation on the old Bank of Montreal building (Main and James); the frieze on the old post office (Main and John; now the court building); and the stone abutment art on the High Level Bridge. Temporale also executed the Norman Bethune Memorial, Beijing, and an Obelisk in Malaysia. Besides his own work, he also transformed the models and maquettes of Frances Loring and many others into works of art. Elizabeth Wyn Wood said of him, in 1939, that "there is no finer stone carver in the world" than Temporale.

In 1991, he was made a Member of the Order of Ontario. He was a member of the Royal Canadian Academy, the Ontario Society of Artists the Sculptors Society of Canada, and the Monument Builders of North America Inc. His life and business partner was his wife Margaret; his partner was his son, Louis Jr. Temporale, who is preserving his father's legacy.
