= Antoine Labelle =

Canadian Catholic priest (1833–1891)

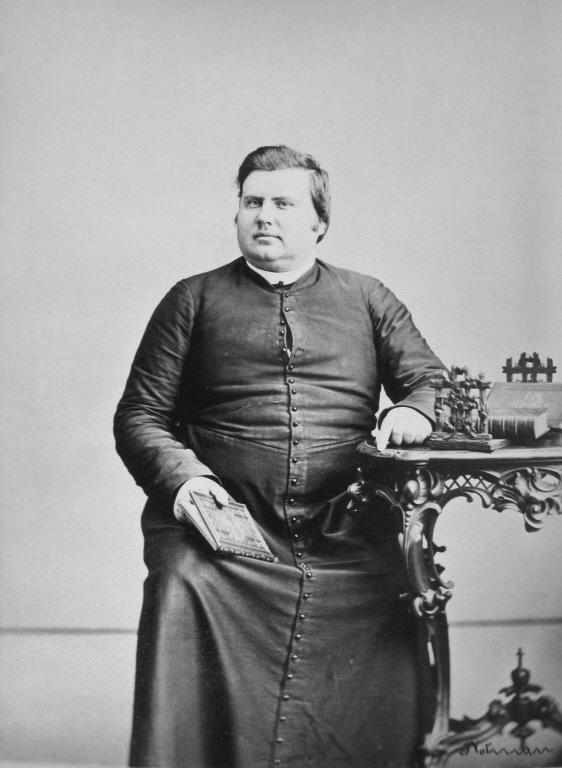
- Born: November 24, 1833; Sainte-Rose (Laval), Lower Canada
- Died: January 4, 1891 (aged 57); Quebec City, Quebec
- Occupation: Roman Catholic priest

François-Xavier-Antoine Labelle (French pronunciation: [fʁɑ̃swa ɡzavje ɑ̃twan labɛl]; November 24, 1833 – January 4, 1891) was a Roman Catholic priest and the person principally responsible for the settlement (or "colonization") of the Laurentians. He is also referred to as "Curé Labelle" and sometimes, the "King of the North."

== Biography ==
This shield is identified as the Labelle family coat of arms, but it is not clear whether the shield or a variation of it was used by Labelle. (See Ecclesiastical heraldry for a discussion of coats of arms used by members of the Roman Catholic clergy.)

He was born Antoine Labelle in Sainte-Rose-de-Lima, the son of Angélique Maher (documents vary as some have Mayer and others have Maillet) and Antoine Labelle, who were quite poor. He studied at the Sainte-Thérèse seminary. Little is known about the first years of his life but it is known that he liked to read Auguste Nicolas and Joseph de Maistre. He added François-Xavier to his name in honour of Saint Francis Xavier. He was ordained as a priest on June 1, 1856, after a comparatively brief theological education from 1852 to 1855. His physical size made him a giant: he was 180 cm (5 ft 11 in) tall and weighed 152 kg (335 pounds). He was first appointed vicar at the parish of Sault-au-Récollet by bishop Ignace Bourget, and later to the parish of Saint-Antoine-Abbé, near the United States border, where he worked until 1863, after which he was assigned to the parish of Saint-Bernard-de-Lacolle. About 1867, frustrated by his debts, he asked to be transferred to an American diocese or a monastery. Instead, Bishop Bourget asked to him to remain, assigning him to the more prosperous parish of Saint-Jérôme.

Labelle immediately sought the construction of a railway line along the Rivière du Nord in the Laurentians to encourage the area's economic development. One of his objectives was to put an end to the emigration of French Canadians towards New England, where many had found employment in textile mills. His social activism was recognized, and he was compared to Auguste-Norbert Morin, who founded Sainte-Adèle. On the whole, he was responsible for five thousand people settling in the Laurentians.

Hugh Allan and John Joseph Caldwell Abbott acknowledged Labelle's support of the Canadian Pacific Railway, and when the first section of the Canadian Pacific's Montreal-Saint-Jerome railway line was inaugurated on October 9, 1876, one of the engines bore Labelle's name. Labelle received support from journalist Arthur Buies (fr) and coureur des bois Isidore Martin.

On May 16, 1888, Quebec premier Honoré Mercier named Labelle deputy minister of the province's department of agriculture and colonization. The end of his life was marked by difficulties with the Conservative party, which placed pressure on bishop Édouard-Charles Fabre, since Labelle had become too liberal for the party's taste and had fought the ultramontanes. He wanted to go to Rome before he died, but he died on January 4, 1891, at 57 years of age.

== Honours ==
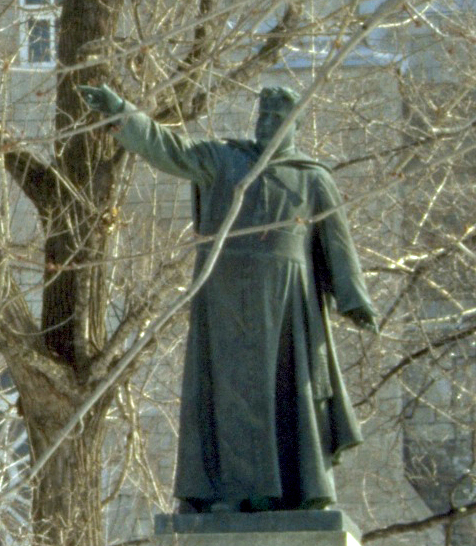
Alfred Laliberté's statue of Antoine Labelle in Saint-Jérôme, Quebec.

A large statue of Labelle was created by sculptor Alfred Laliberté and was erected in front of the Saint-Jérôme cathedral. His efforts to colonize the Laurentides region figure prominently in the 1956–1970 television series Les Belles Histoires des pays d'en haut, in which he was portrayed by Paul Desmarteaux, and in the 2016–2021 remake Les Pays d'en haut, in which he was portrayed by Antoine Bertrand.

The Papineau-Labelle Wildlife Reserve is named after him and Louis-Joseph Papineau.

A secondary school named after him was opened in Laval, Quebec, in 1961, near the Roi-du-Nord park, also named after him. Curé-Antoine-Labelle School currently has more than 2,600 students and more than 200 staff members.

Many other sites and landmarks were named in honour of Curé Labelle. They include:

- Boulevard Curé-Labelle (Route 117), located in the Laurentides area, Quebec, Canada;
- The municipality of Labelle;
- The regional county municipality of Antoine-Labelle;
- The provincial electoral district of Labelle, Quebec;
- Rue Labelle (Labelle Street), located in Shawinigan, Quebec.
