= Florence Wyle =

American-Canadian sculptor, designer and poet

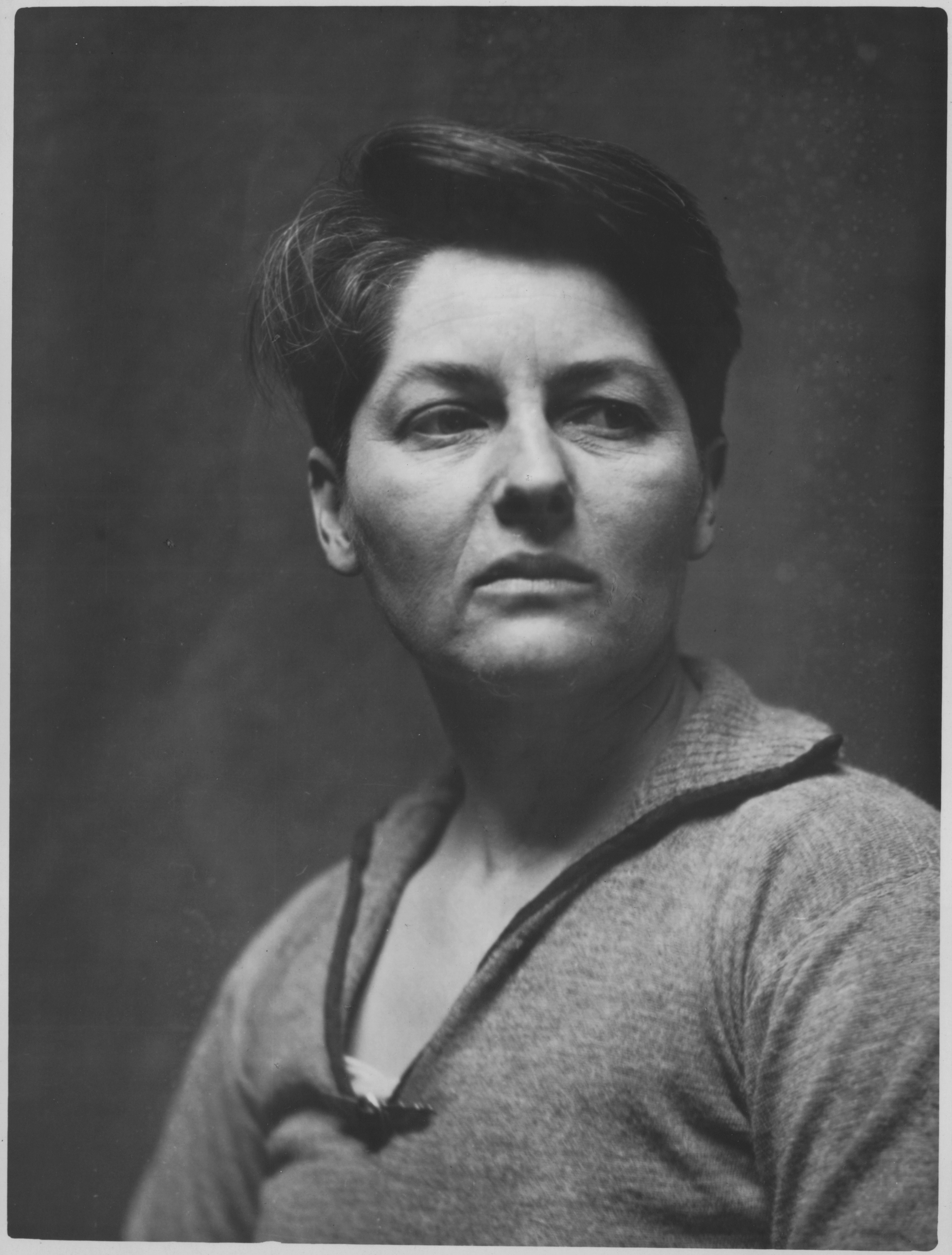
- Wyle in 1930
- Born: Florence Norma Wyle; November 14, 1881; Trenton, Illinois, US
- Died: January 14, 1968 (aged 86); Newmarket, Ontario, Canada
- Education: School of the Art Institute of Chicago
- Known for: Sculptor and designer
- Movement: Neo-Classical
- Partner: Frances Loring
- Patrons: Elizabeth Bradford Holbrook

Florence Norma Wyle RCA (November 14, 1881 – January 14, 1968) was an American-Canadian sculptor, designer and poet; a pioneer of the Canadian art scene. She practiced chiefly in Toronto, living and working with her partner Frances Loring, with whom she shared a studio and home for almost sixty years. In 1928, with Loring, Alfred Laliberté, Elizabeth Wyn Wood, Emanuel Hahn and Henri Hébert, she co-founded the Sculptors' Society of Canada, for which she served as president in 1942. She was the first woman sculptor to become a full member of the Royal Canadian Academy of Arts. Throughout her career, alongside Loring, she persistently and convincingly advocated for policy, tax benefits and living wages in support of artists' work.

== Biography ==
Wyle was born in Trenton, Illinois and in 1900 enrolled at the University of Illinois as a pre-med student where anatomy classes awakened in her a wonder and reverence for human anatomy. Three years later (1903) she transferred to the School of the Art Institute of Chicago where she began studying clay modeling with Lorado Taft. She studied modelling and sculptural design in the US with Frances Loring.

Wyle moved to Toronto in 1913 to join Loring who had moved there the year before. Wyle worked as a sculptor in clay, plasticine, stone and wood until her death in 1968. Most of her carvings were executed by herself. One of her early works, Sun Worshipper (1916) is a bronze female nude "basking in the rays" and arching her body in a way that "hints more than a little at sexual pleasures."

Wyle was a member of the Ontario Society of Artists (1920–1933, then from 1948), the Sculptors Society of Canada (1933), the Royal Canadian Academy of Arts (associate 1920, full member 1938) and the Canadian Guild of Potters.

=== Career and official commissions ===
Wyle preferred to make sculpture that was small in scale and concerned with pure form compared with that of her partner Frances Loring. Curators observe that she had a better grasp of modelling and anatomy.

She was made a member of the Royal Canadian Academy of Arts. Her work, like Loring's, was often exhibited by many institutions such as the Royal Canadian Academy of Arts, the Ontario Society of Artists, the Sculptors Society of Canada and the Women's Art Association of Canada. Small figurines in wood which were part of the Dominion Drama Festival trophy set were among her commissions the year she was 80. The Ontario Veterinary College has one of her pieces, a bas-relief panel 13' high depicting farm animals. The late Pearl McCarthy, art critic for the Globe and Mail, once said that large or small, cats or heroes, the sculpture of Frances Wyle had a lyrical as well as classical quality.

- 1926 – St. Stephen War Memorial
- 1957 – Mother and Children, Canadian National Exhibition

=== Posthumous honour ===
In 2000, the Canadian Portrait Academy made Wyle an Honorary Academician naming her one of the Top 100 Artists of the 20th Century.

The Loring-Wyle Parkette, located at Mount Pleasant Road and St Clair Avenue in Toronto, Ontario, contains a bust of Wyle sculpted by Loring.

== Publications ==
- Wyle, Florence (1959). Poems. Toronto: Ryerson Press.
- Wyle, Florence; Kilbourn, Rosemary (1976). The shadow of the year: poems. Toronto: Aliquando Press.
