= Alfred Laliberté =

Canadian artist (1877-1953)

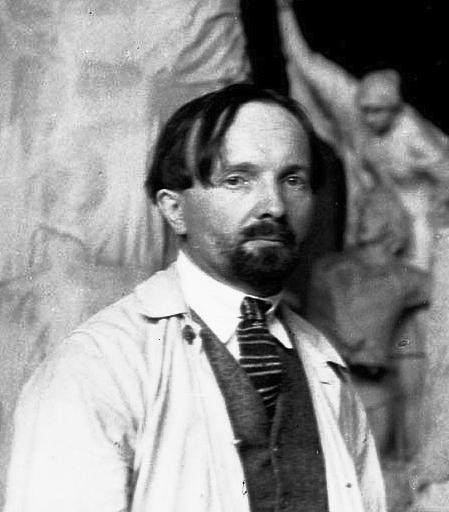
- Alfred Laliberté, circa 1920
- Born: 19 May 1877; Sainte-Élisabeth-de-Warwick, Quebec
- Died: 13 January 1953 (aged 75); Montreal, PQ
- Education: École nationale supérieure des Beaux-Arts in Paris
- Known for: sculptor
- Spouse: Jeanne Lavallee (m. 1940)

Alfred Laliberté RCA (19 May 1877 – 13 January 1953) was a French-Canadian sculptor and painter based in Montreal. His output includes more than 900 sculptures in bronze, marble, wood, and plaster. Many of his sculptures depict national figures and events in Canada and France such as Louis Hébert, François-Xavier-Antoine Labelle, Adam Dollard des Ormeaux, and the Lower Canada Rebellion. Although he produced hundreds of paintings as well, he is chiefly remembered for his work as a sculptor.

== Life and career ==
Born in Sainte-Élisabeth-de-Warwick, Quebec, in the district of Arthabaska, Laliberté was the son of Joseph Laliberté, a farmer, and Marie Richard. From an early age he began learning the agricultural trade and he initially intended on working in the family business. He began sculpting as a hobby at the age of 15. His work drew the attention of the Honourable Wilfrid Laurier who encouraged him to enter the Conseil des arts et manufactures (CAM) in Montreal. It was largely through Laurier's attention that Laliberté earned his father's approval to enter the CAM in 1896. In 1888 he won first prize at the Québec City Provincial Exhibition for his life size sculpture of Laurier.

In 1902, Laliberté entered the École nationale supérieure des Beaux-Arts in Paris at the age of 23. While there he became friends with his compatriot, the painter Marc-Aurèle de Foy Suzor-Coté. He returned to Canada in 1907 where he began producing works that showed a marked influence of the sculptor Auguste Rodin.

In 1922, Laliberté joined the faculty of the École des Beaux-Arts de Montréal (now a part of the Université du Québec à Montréal). Alfred Laliberté cofounded the Sculptors Society of Canada in 1928 with Frances Loring, Florence Wyle, Elizabeth Wyn Wood, Wood's teacher and husband Emanuel Hahn and Henri Hébert. He was made a member of the Royal Canadian Academy of Arts.

Between 1928 and 1932, he produced 215 small bronze sculptures depicting legends, customs and rural activities of the past and present history of the pioneers of Canada. On 22 June 1940, he married Jeanne Lavallee. He died in Montreal in 1953 and is buried in the Notre Dame des Neiges Cemetery. He wrote three manuscripts about his life and works, Mes mémoires, Réflexions sur l'art et l'artiste, and Les artistes de mon temps, all of which were published together in 1978 under the title Mes souvenirs.

== Works ==
Title/Subject	Public Office	Artist	Date Painted/Created	Medium
Robert Borden	Prime Minister	Alfred Laliberté	1915	Marble
Adam Dollard des Ormeaux	colonist and soldier in Ville Marie, New France	Alfred Laliberté	1923 (circa 1911–1915)	Bronze

== Works ==
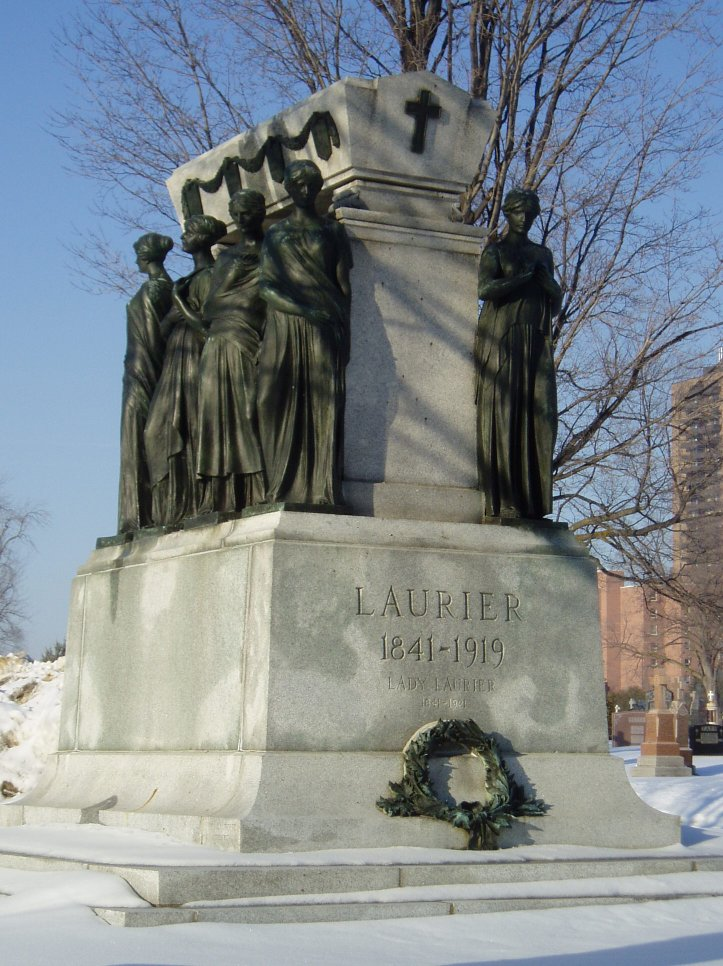
Alfred Laliberté's sculpture at Wilfrid Laurier's grave in Ottawa, Ontario's Notre-Dame Cemetery (Ottawa)

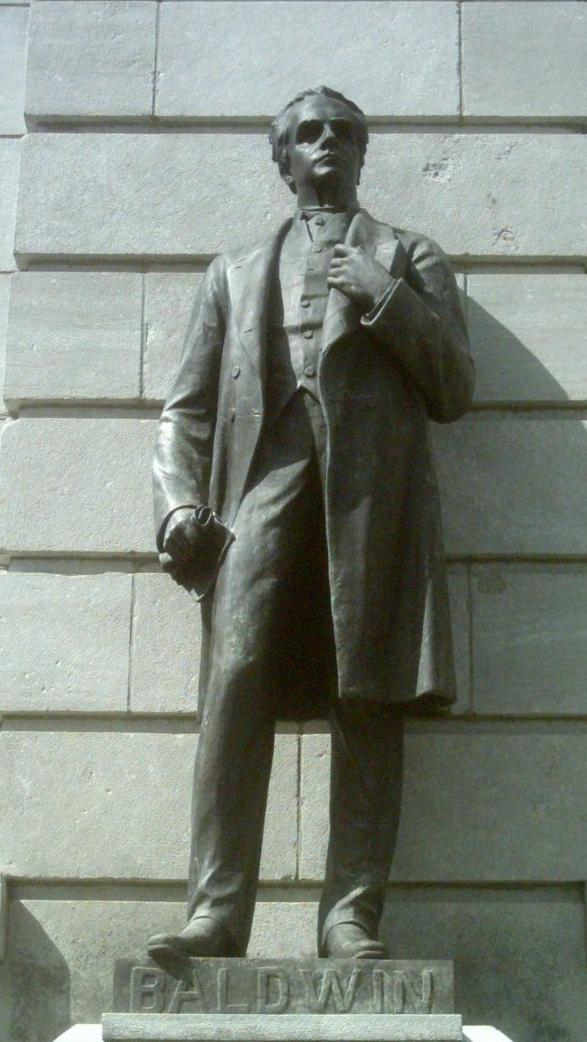
Alfred Laliberté's Robert Baldwin sculpture in front of Parliament Building (Quebec)

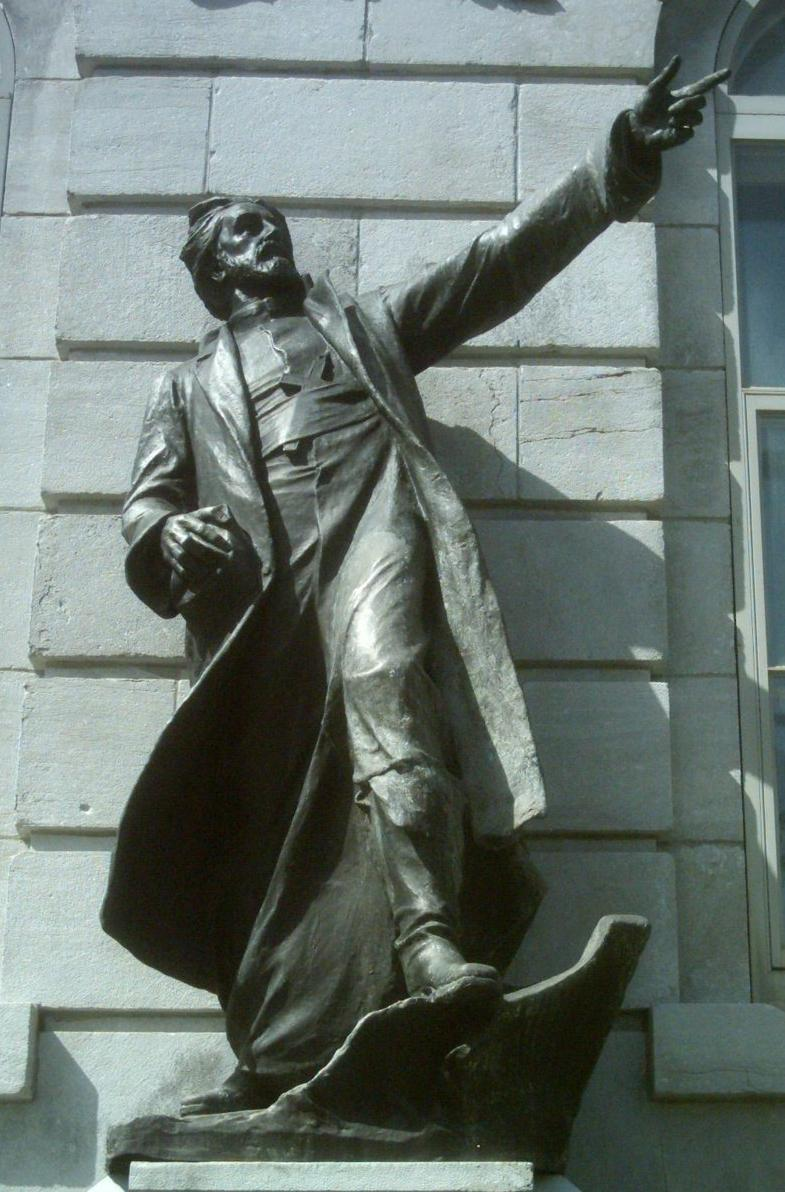
Alfred Laliberté's Jacques Marquette sculpture in front of Parliament Building (Quebec)

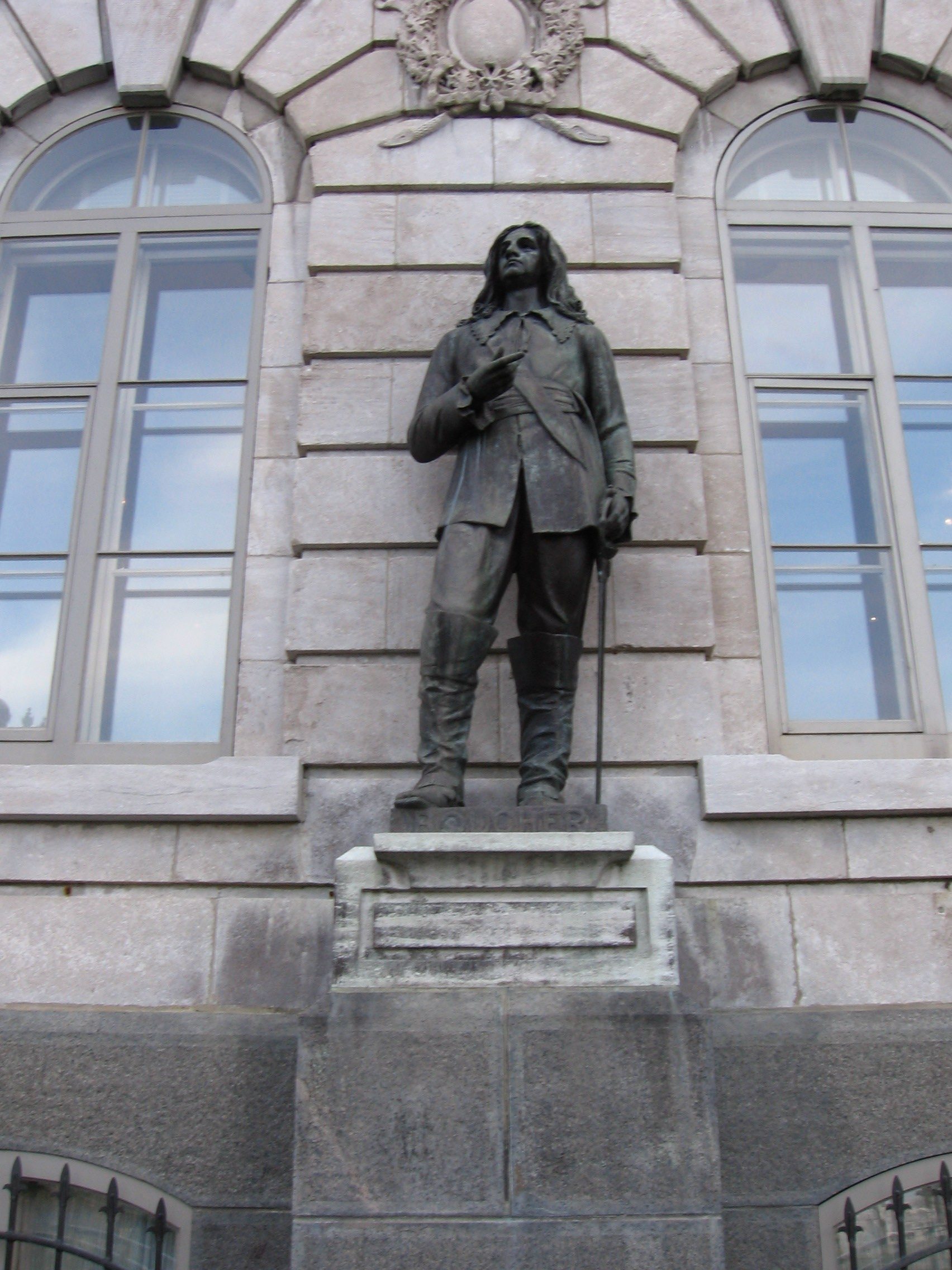
Alfred Laliberté's Pierre Boucher sculpture in front of Parliament Building (Quebec)

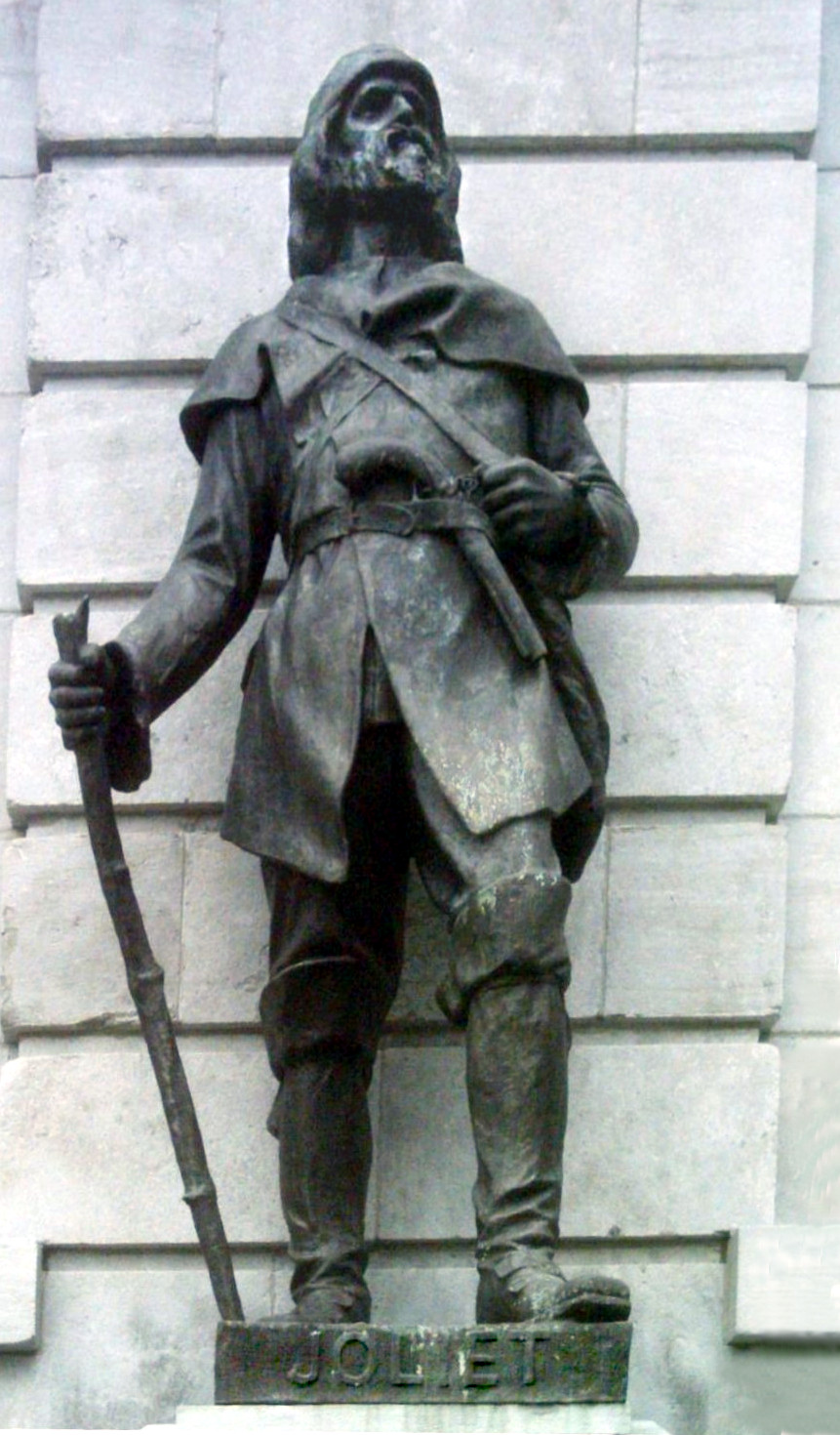
Alfred Laliberté's Louis Jolliet sculpture in front of Parliament Building (Quebec)

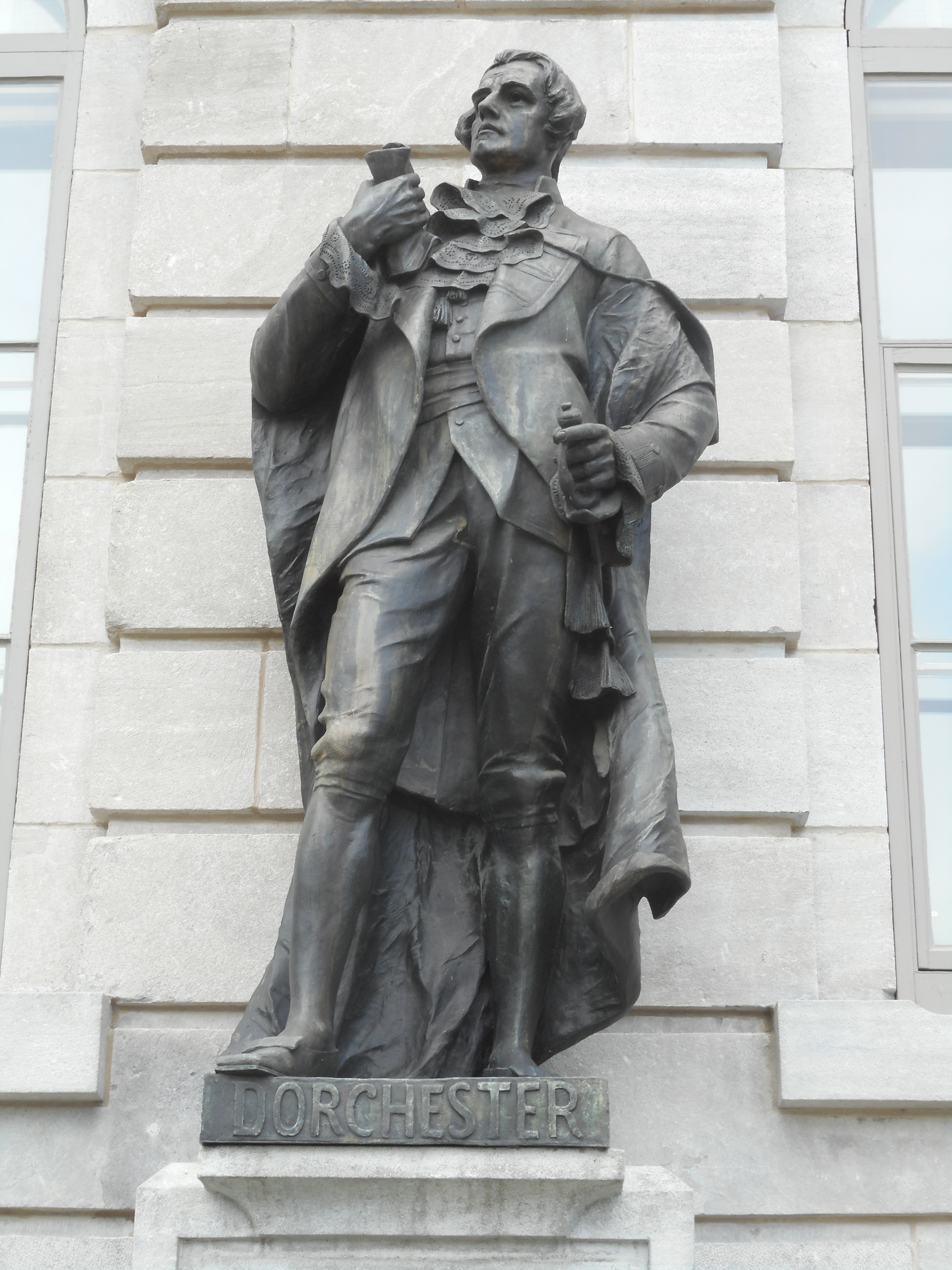
Alfred Laliberté's Guy Carleton, 1st Baron Dorchester sculpture in front of Parliament Building (Quebec)

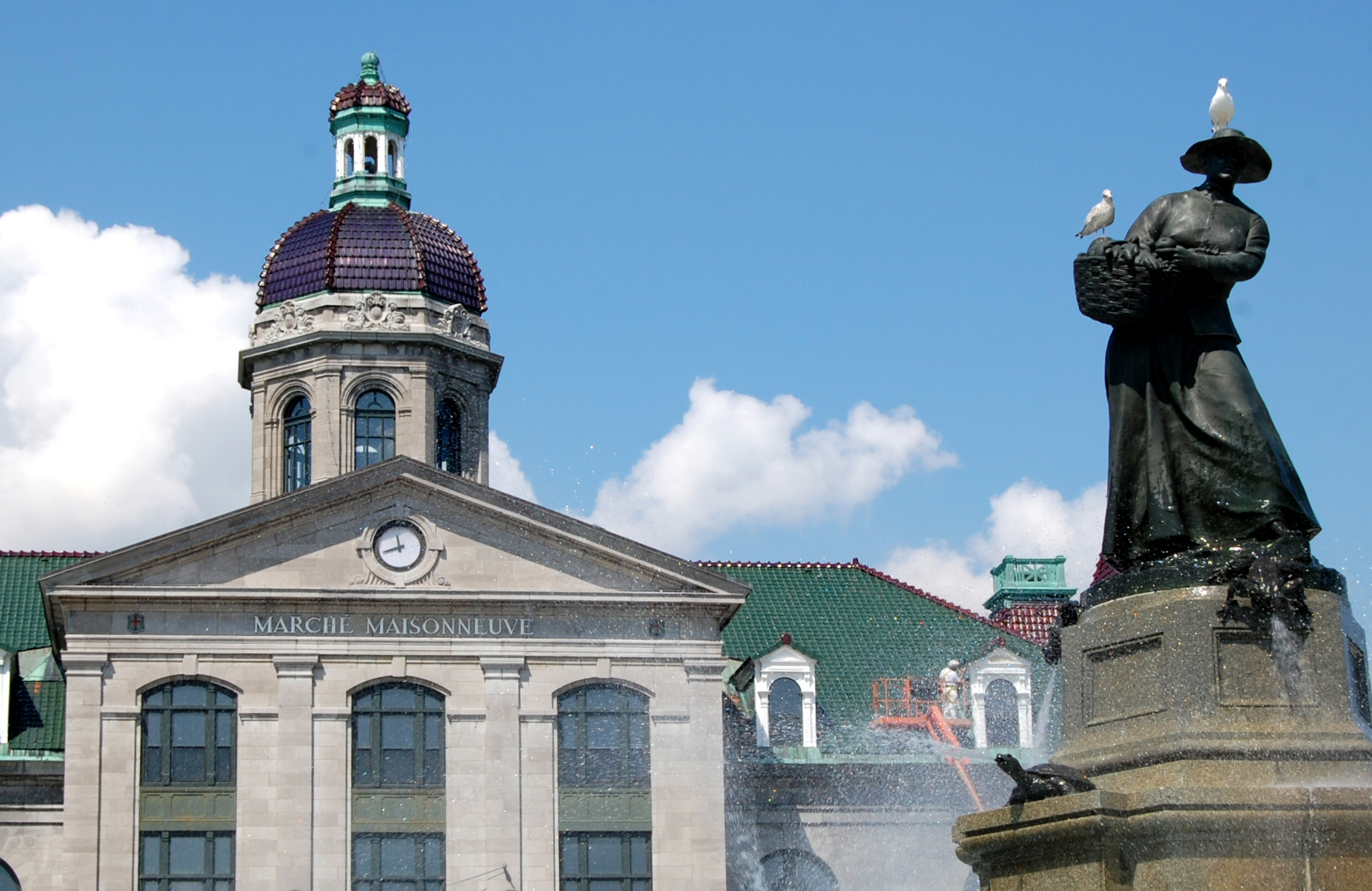
Alfred Laliberté's Fermière Monument La Fermière at Marché Maisonneuve, d'Hochelaga-Maisonneuve

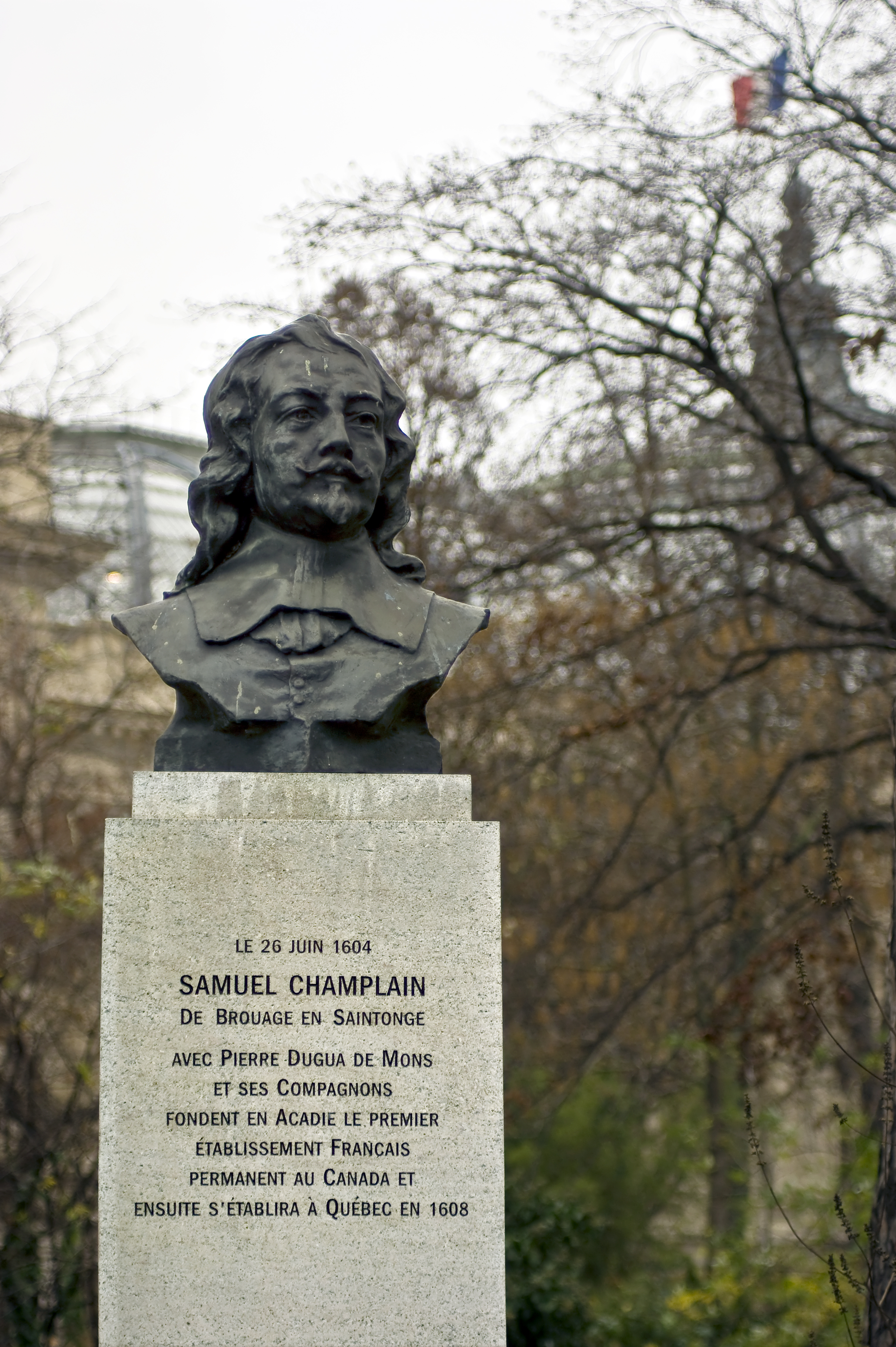
Alfred Laliberté's Samuel Champlain, 8th arrondissement of Paris

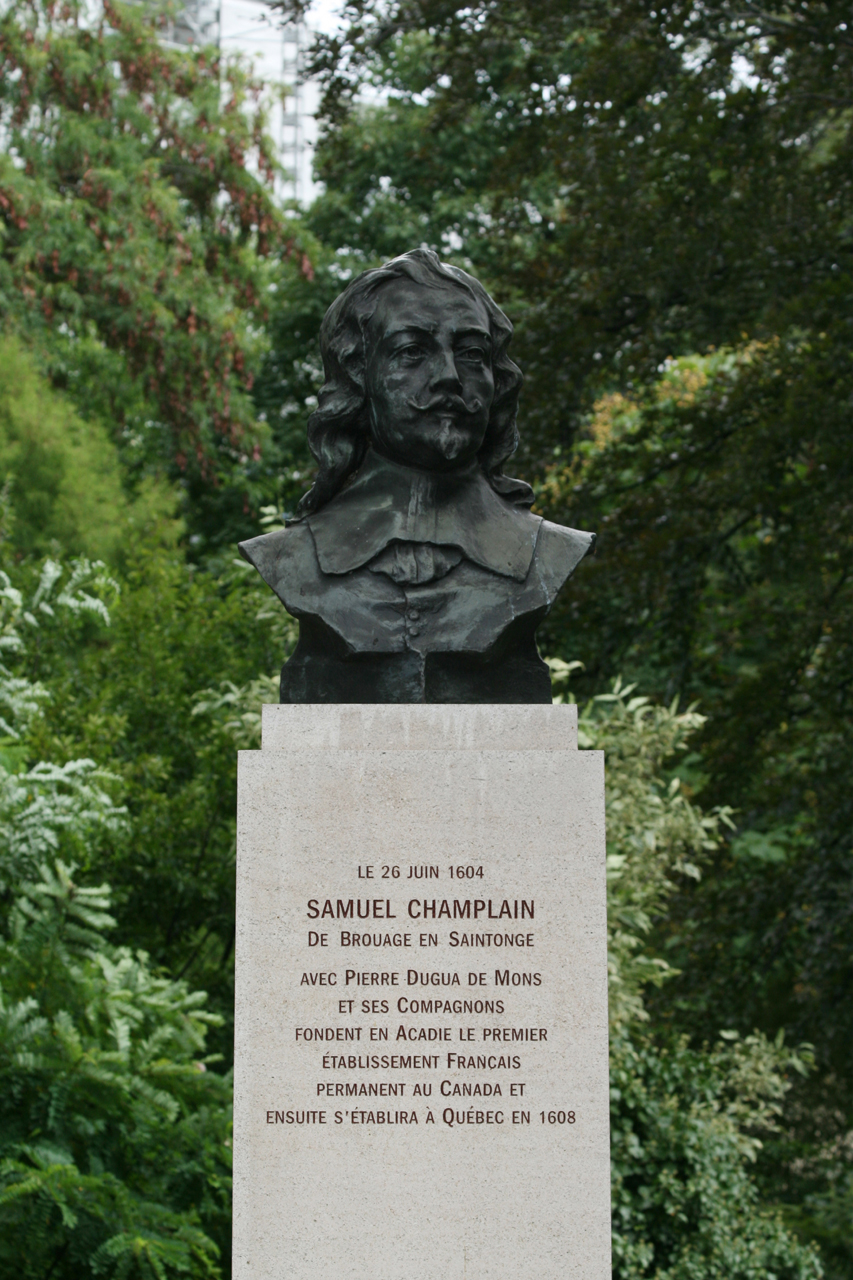
Alfred Laliberté's Samuel Champlain, 8th arrondissement of Paris

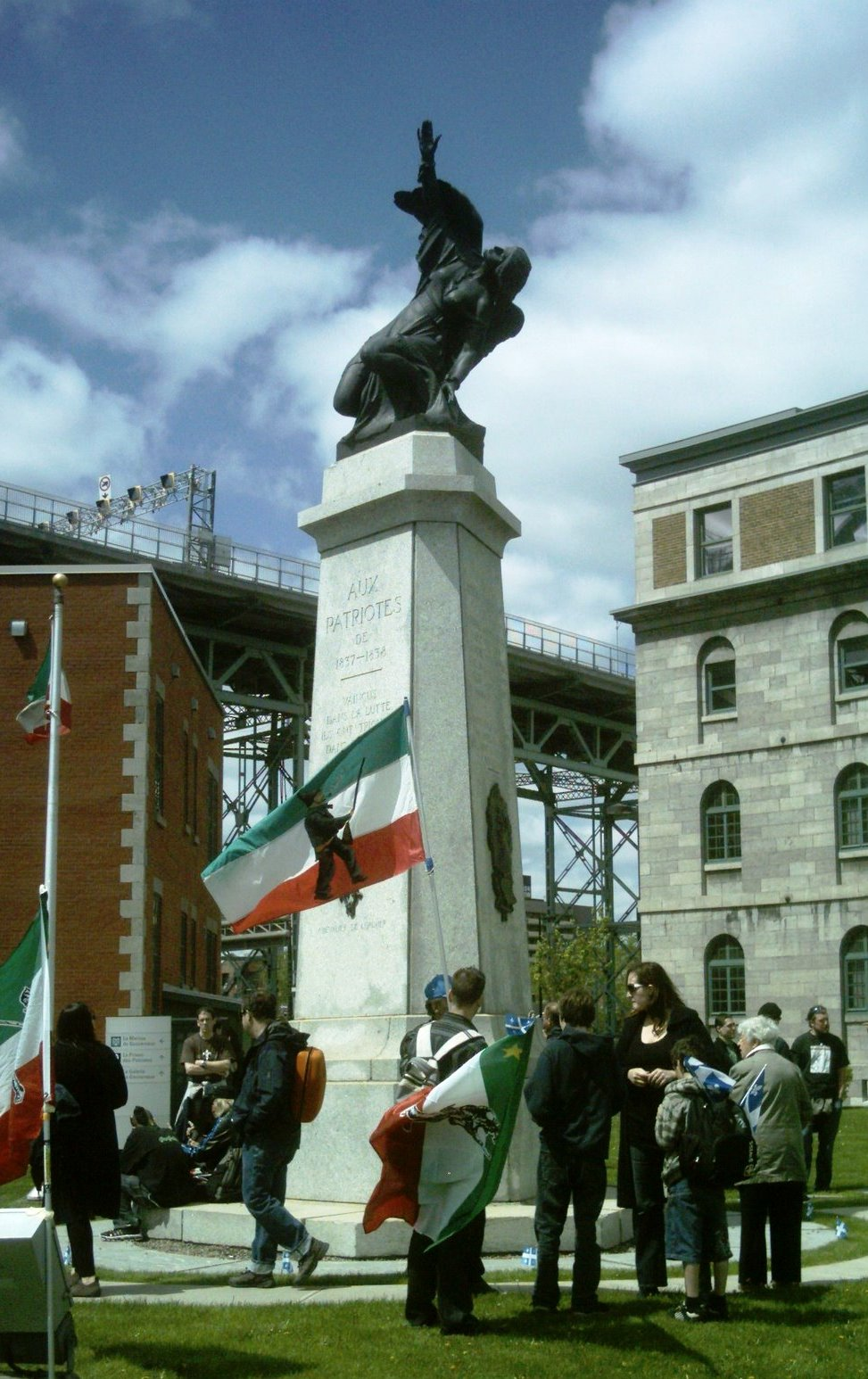
Alfred Laliberté's Monument aux Patriotes, Montreal 1926, War memorial Pied-du-Courant Prison Montreal, Quebec

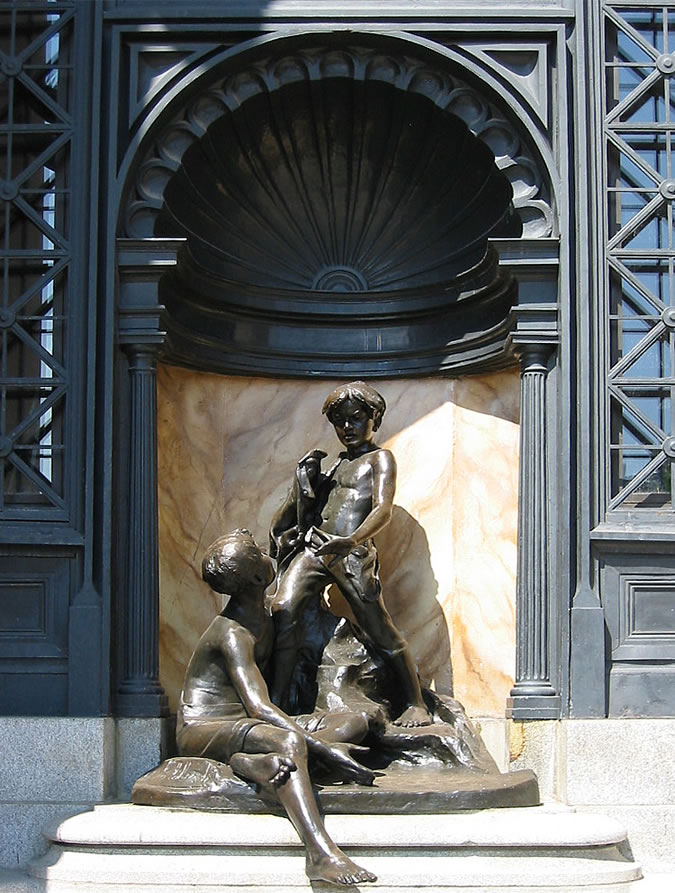
Alfred Laliberté's "Les petits Baigneurs" (1915) restored 1992 at Maisonneuve public baths, Montreal, Quebec

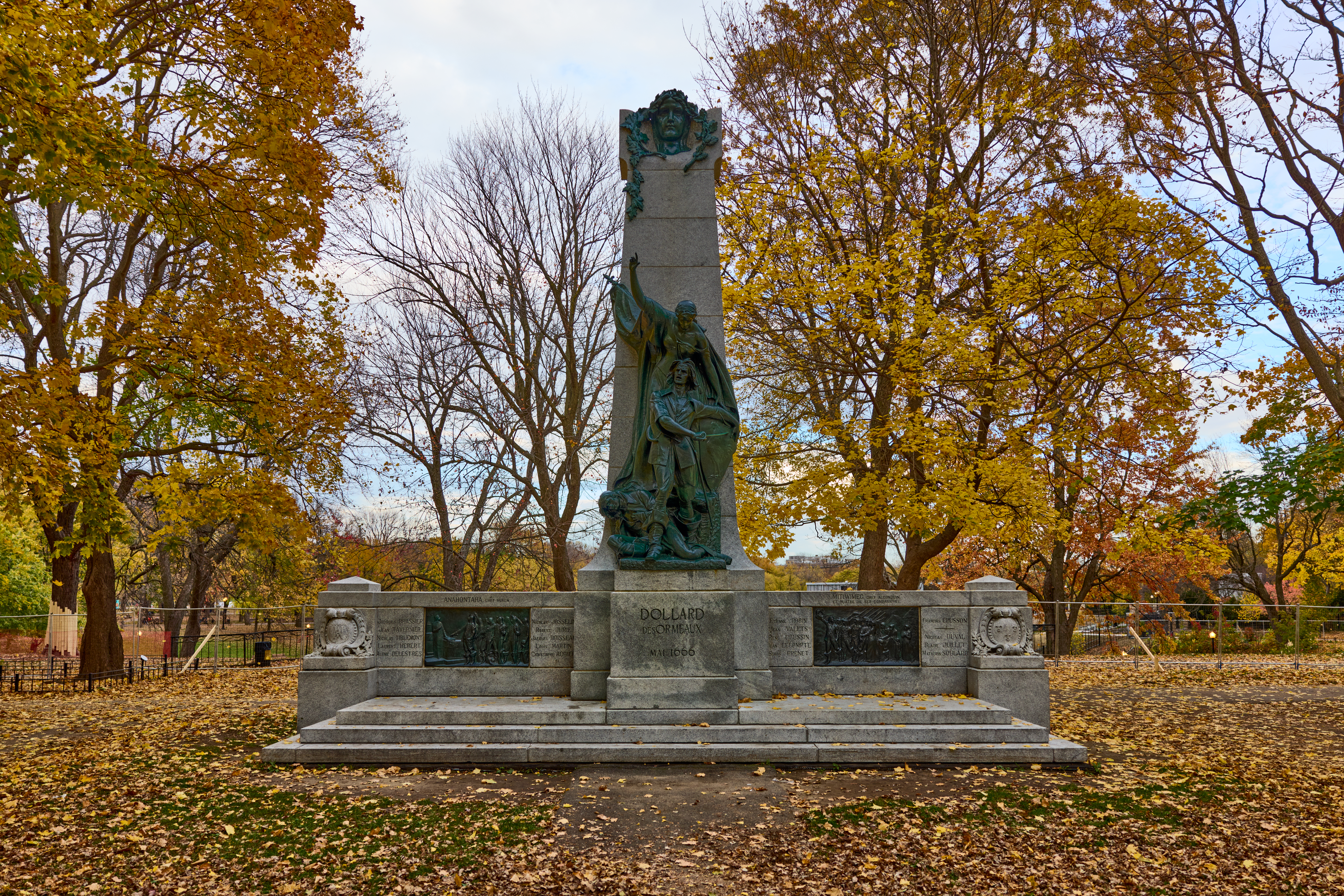
Alfred Laliberté's Adam Dollard des Ormeaux in parc Lafontaine Montréal, Quebec

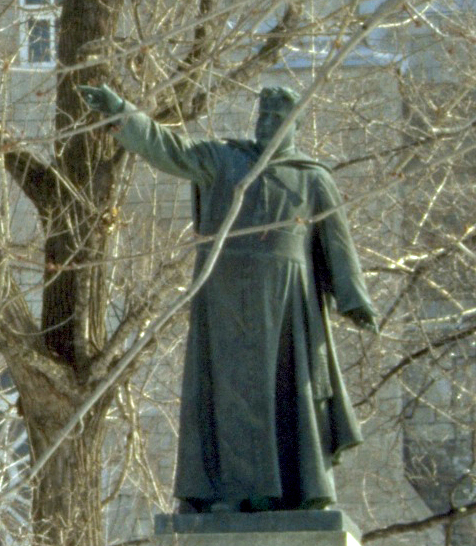
Alfred Laliberté's statue of François-Xavier-Antoine Labelle in Saint-Jérôme, Quebec
- Alfred Laliberté's La Corriveau (1928–32) is a statue of Marie-Josephte Corriveau

== Sources ==
- Alfred Laliberté, Witness to His Era (in French)
- Gallery of works of Alfred Laliberté at Cybermuse
