= Elizabeth Wyn Wood =

Canadian sculptor

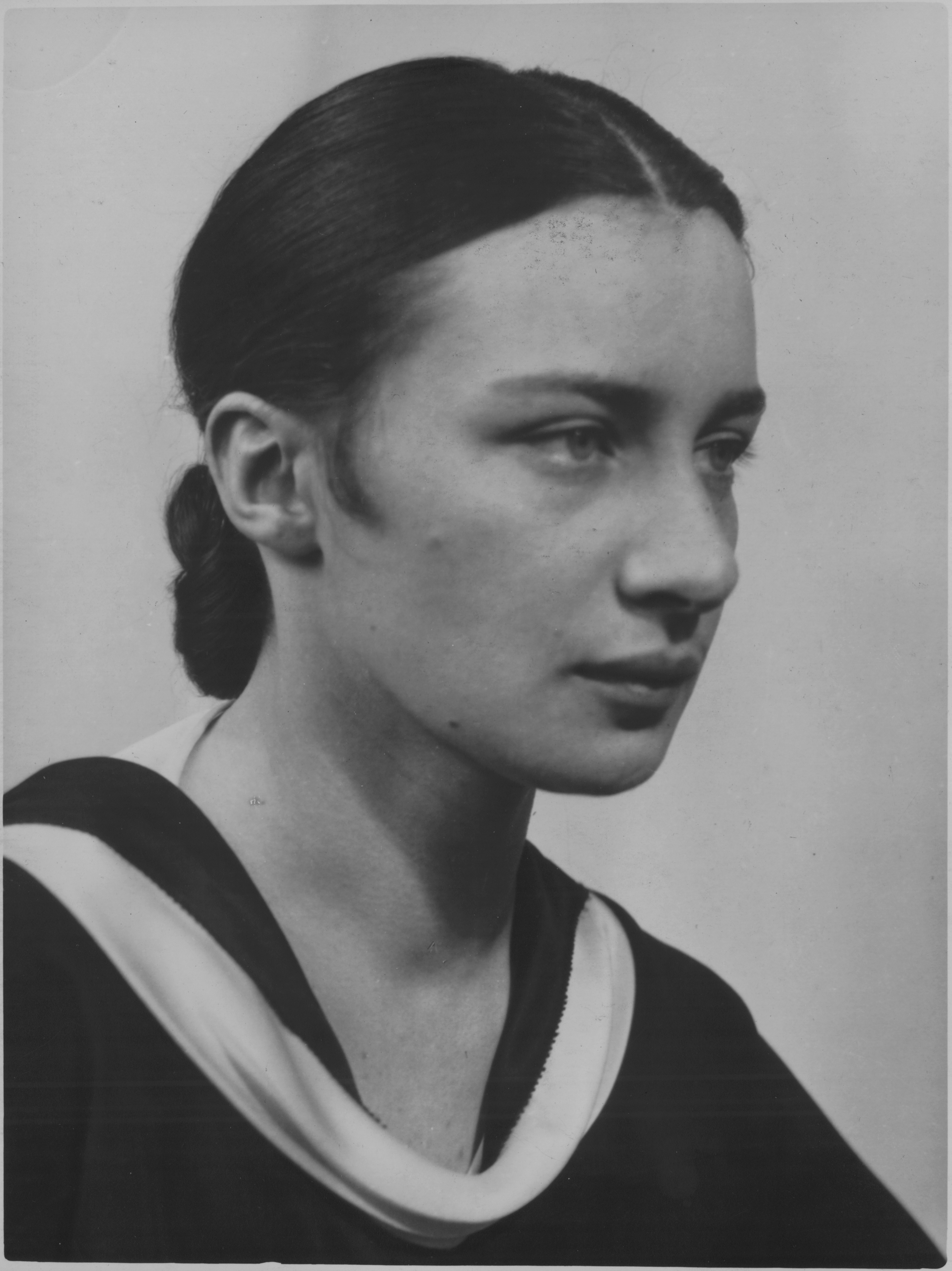
- Born: October 8, 1903; Orillia, Ontario, Canada
- Died: January 27, 1966 (aged 62); Willowdale, Ontario, Canada
- Education: Ontario College of Art; Art Students League of New York
- Known for: Sculptor
- Movement: Modernism
- Spouse: Emanuel Hahn (m.1926)

Elizabeth Winnifred Wood RCA (October 8, 1903 – January 27, 1966), known as Elizabeth Wyn Wood, was a Canadian sculptor and advocate of art education. A notable figure in Canadian sculpture, she is primarily known for her modernist interpretation of the Canadian landscape in her works.

== Early life and education ==
Elizabeth Wyn Wood was born at her family's cottage on Cedar Island, just offshore from Orillia, Ontario, on October 8, 1903. She was the fourth child of Edward Alfred Wood (1860–1915) and Sarah Elizabeth Weafer (1864–1952). Wood had an older brother named Edward, two older sisters, Fern, and Elmo, and a younger brother named John.

Edward Wood Sr. was the proprietor of a dry-goods and women's clothing store in Orillia, Ontario. The same year that Elizabeth was born, the Woods moved into their home at 136 West Street in Orillia. The family also had two summer homes on Lake Couchiching. During the summer months, the family spent the majority of their time on the lake, and Wood learned how to swim and canoe at an early age.

Wood demonstrated an affinity for sculpture at a young age, using plasticine and clay to create art as a child. From 1910–1917, starting at the age of seven, Wood attended St. Mildred's College in Toronto, Ontario. She returned to Orillia every summer to spend time with her family in the wilderness surrounding their summer homes. Wood attended Ontario College of Art (OCA), graduating in 1926. While at OCA, Wood studied with Group of Seven artists Arthur Lismer and J.E.H. MacDonald. She studied sculpture under Emanuel Hahn (whom she married in 1926). In November 1926, Wood began a two-month placement at the Art Students League of New York, studying with Robert Laurent and Edward McCarton. While in New York, she spent time studying Ancient Egyptian art and sculpture. By 1930, Wood was described as "perhaps the most advanced and adventurous sculptor working in Canada" by art critic Blodwen Davies. Wood was a founding member of the Sculptors' Society of Canada.

== Notable works and affiliations ==
"Sculptural form is not the imitation of natural form any more than poetry is the imitation of natural conversation . . . While a piece of sculpture may contain visual forms with which we are acquainted by daily experience, it is essentially a design worked out by means of the juxtaposition of masses in space, just as poetry is a design wrought by the sounds of words in time." (Elizabeth Wyn Wood, 1935)

=== Passing Rain (1928) ===
Passing Rain is a relief sculpture, designed by Elizabeth Wyn Wood. The relief was originally made from plaster, then later commissioned to be made in marble when she was 26 years old. Passing Rain is an early example of Wood's modernist style and landscape work. The relief gained praise very quickly and would win her the Lord Willingdon Award in 1929. Passing Rain is owned and displayed at the National Gallery of Canada in Ottawa, Ontario.

=== Welland-Crowland War Memorial (1939) ===
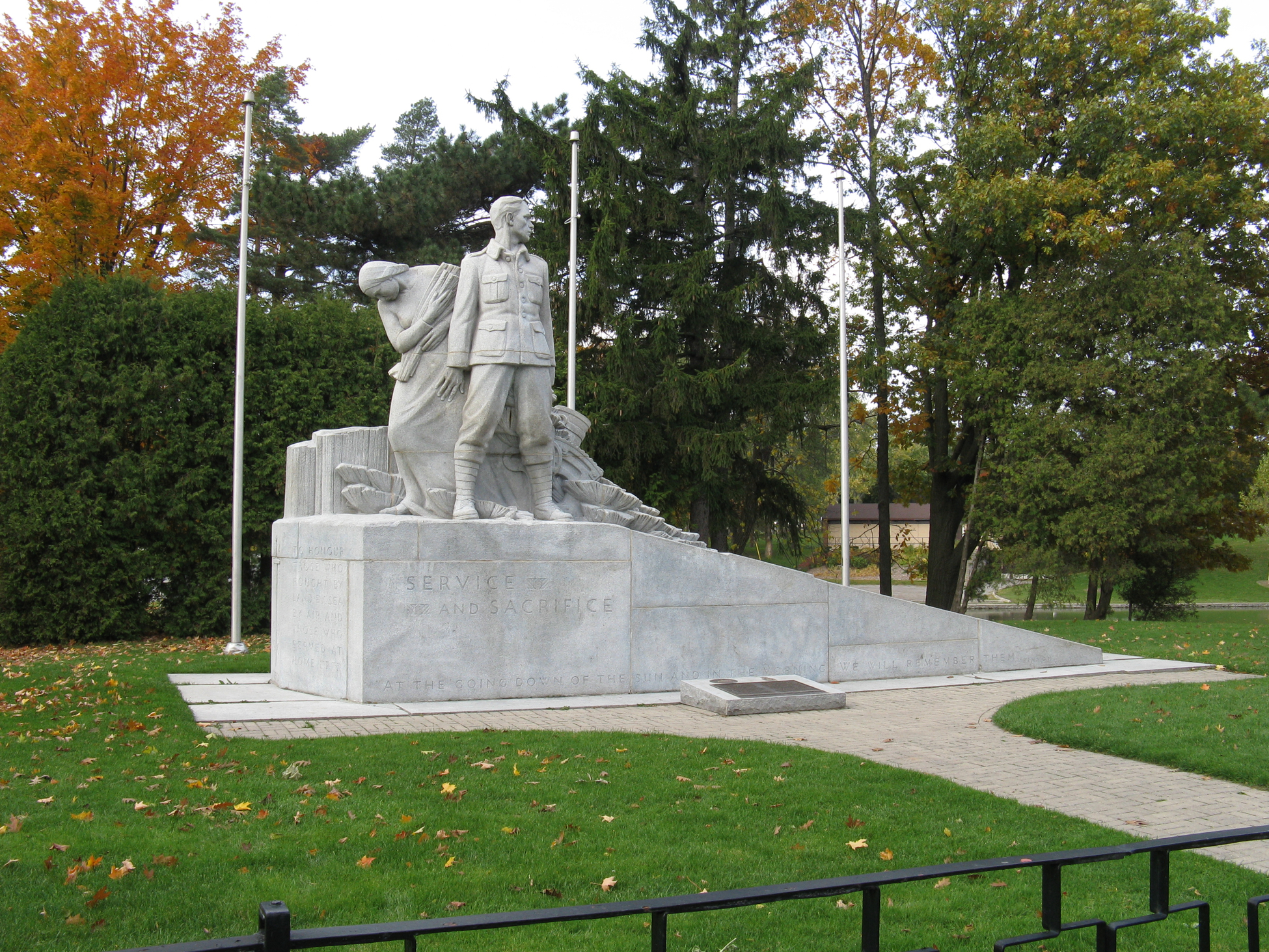
Welland-Crowland War Memorial in Chippawa Park, Welland, Ontario.

The Welland-Crowland War Memorial designed by Elizabeth Wyn Wood, features two heroic figures, Man the Defender and Woman the Giver, set against the Canadian landscape. Wood was chosen as the sculptor by winning a national competition for the project. Planned as part of a regional beautification plan for the lands along the Welland Canal, the memorial was intended to be visible and intelligible to passengers on passing boats. The memorial was the final large World War I memorial unveiled in Canada, built with over $36,000 of donations collected from the citizens from the city of Welland and Crowland during the peak of the depression. Sculpted from LaCass Granite located in Quebec, the piece was cut to size by the Thomson Monument Company based on Wood's full-size clay model. Canadian artist and sculptor, Louis Temporale, completed the fine surface carving of the monument.

The Welland-Crowland War Memorial depicts two heroic figures, a soldier and a woman. The monument represts the sacrifice and the service of those who fought and those who supported the war from home. It uses similar design elements, such as a single soldier based on common designs of vintage monuments. Unlike vintage sculptures, Wyn Wood includes elements of red pine and wheat sheaves based on a World War I trench mortar. The Welland-Crowland War Memorial was unveiled one day after World War II began on September 4, 1939, by Lieutenant Colonel Archdeacon F.G. Scott, D.S.O., Senior chaplain of the First Canadian Division during World War I, and Canadian poet.

=== Other works ===
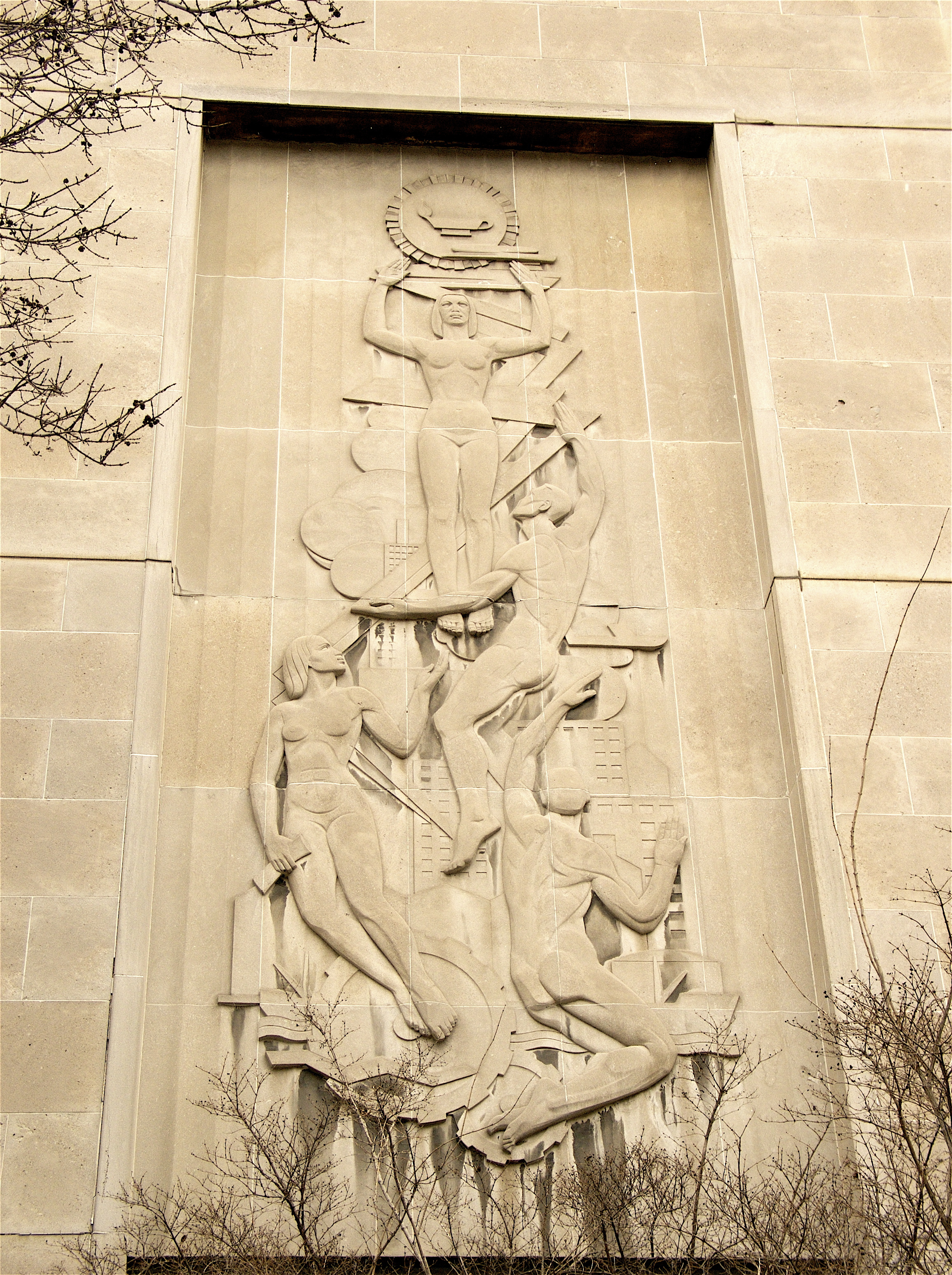
Elizabeth Wyn Wood's Bas-relief at Toronto Metropolitan University, Ontario.

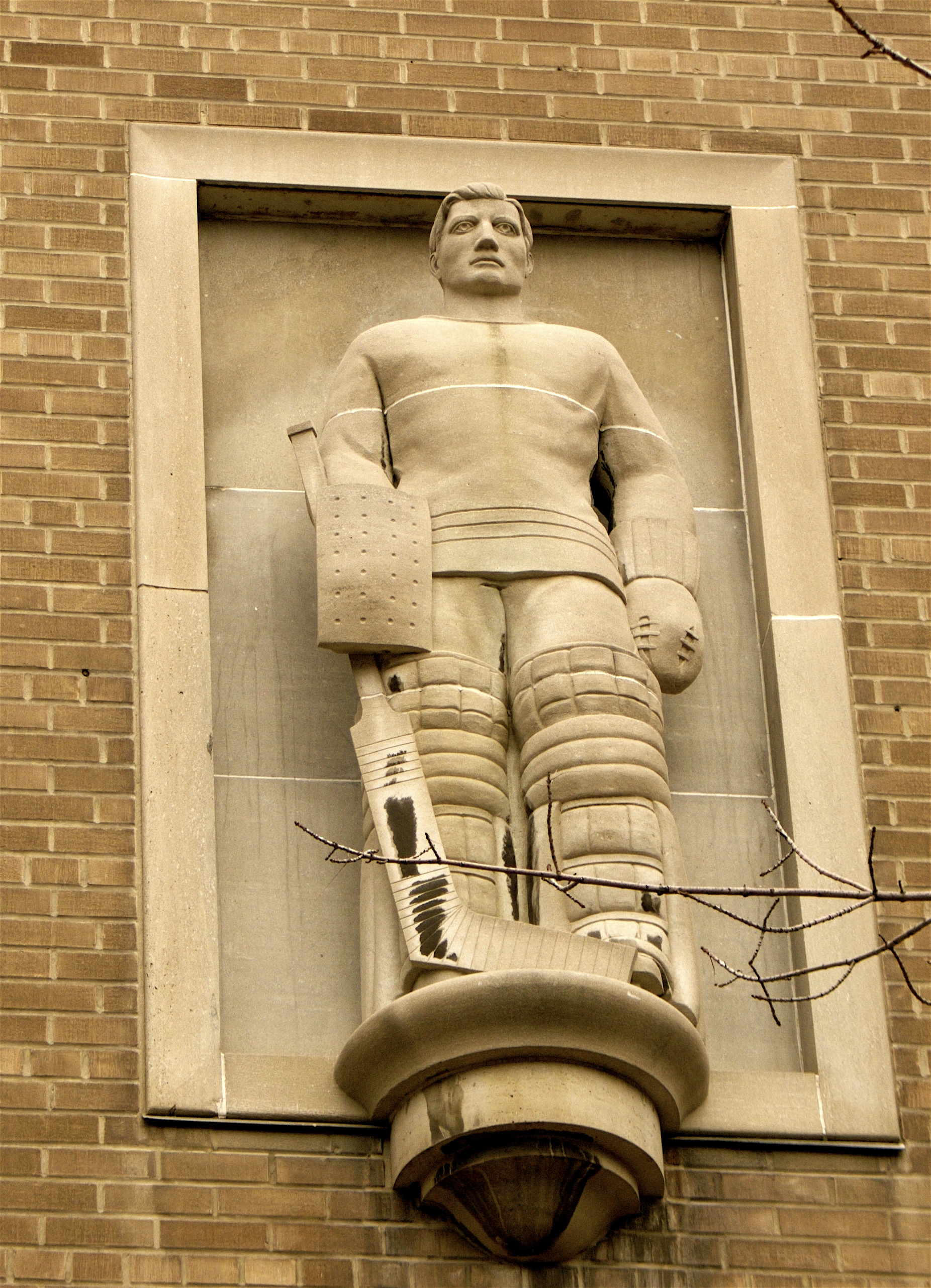
Elizabeth Wyn Wood's high relief of a Goaltender at Toronto Metropolitan University, Ontario.

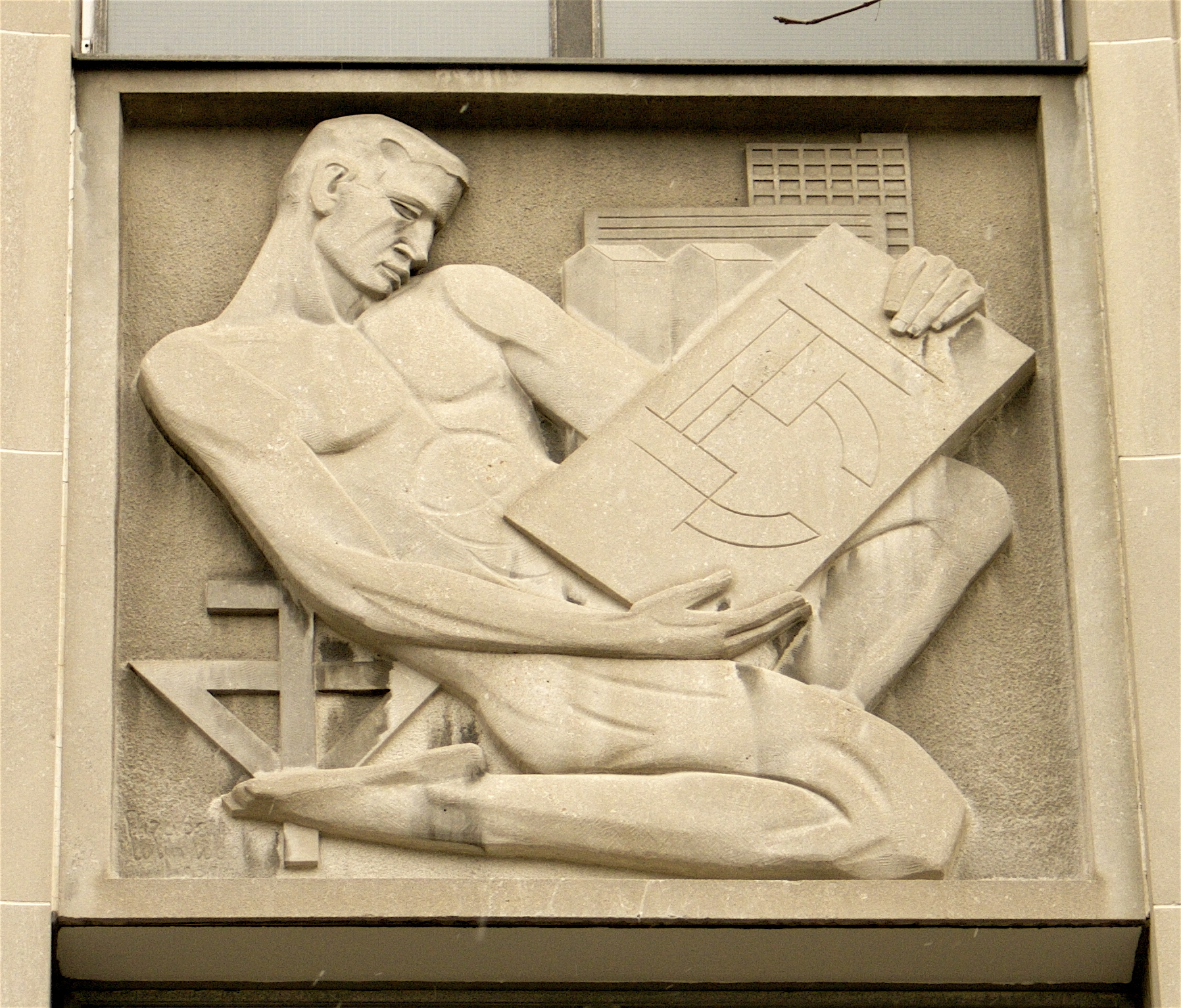
Elizabeth Wyn Wood's Bas Relief at Ryerson University in Toronto, Ontario.

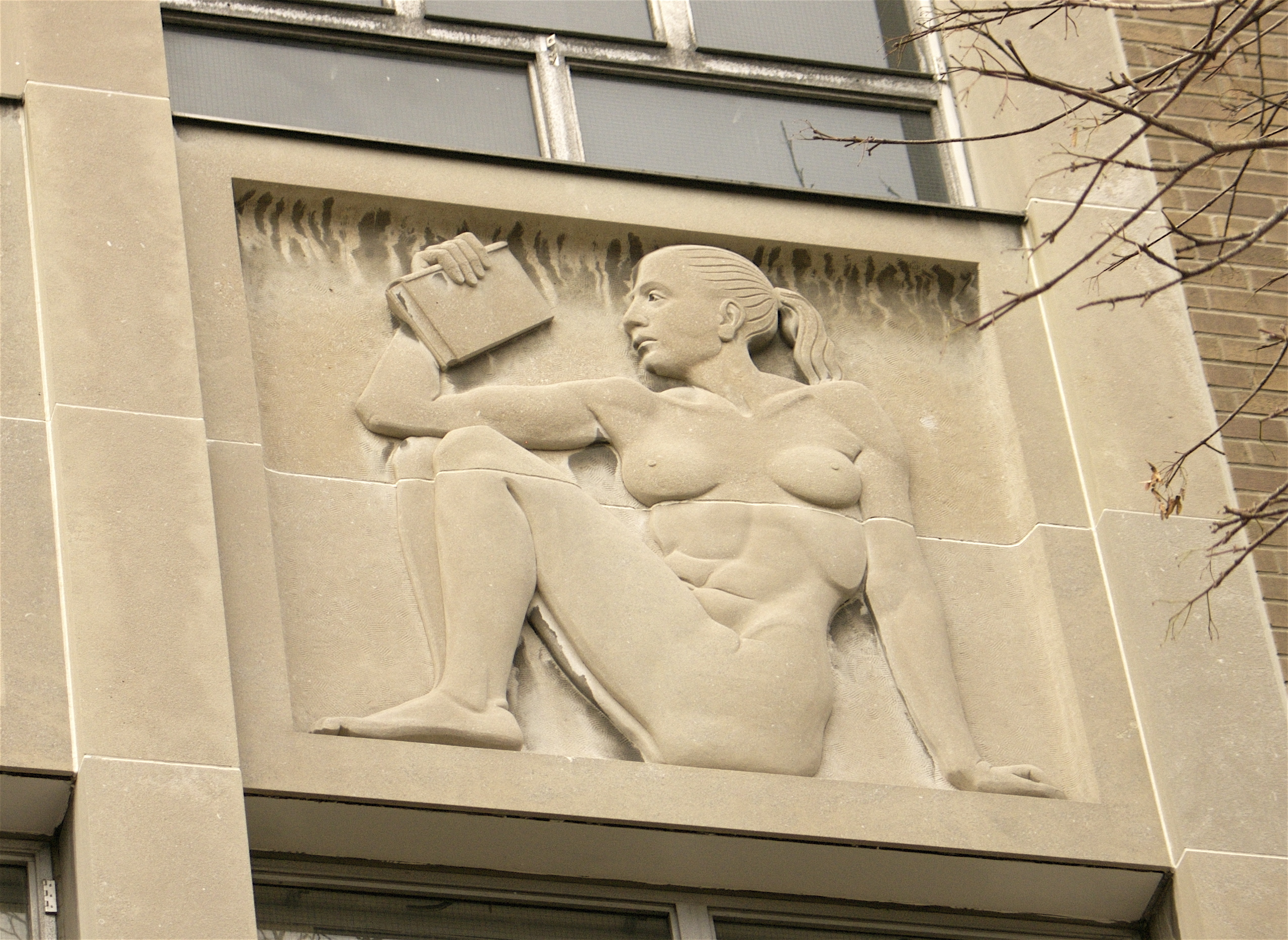
Elizabeth Wyn Wood's Bas Relief at Ryerson University in Toronto, Ontario.

=== Professional affiliations and awards ===
Wood was a founding member of the Sculptors' Society of Canada along with Alfred Laliberté, Frances Loring, Florence Wyle and Henri Hébert, in which the worked in collaboration with The National Gallery of Canada. In 1945, she was a founding member of the Canadian Arts Council (renamed the Canadian Conference of the Arts in 1958). As a Council member, she served as Organizing Secretary (1944–1945), Chair of the International Relations Committee (1945–1948), and Vice President (1945–1948). As chair of the Foreign Relations Committee, she participated in the organization of, and wrote the catalogue foreword for, an exhibition of 74 artists entitled Canadian Women Artists at the Riverside Museum, New York, N.Y. (April 27 – May 18, 1947). She was made a member of the Royal Canadian Academy of Arts (1948) and a member of the Ontario Society of Artists (1929). She was inducted into the Orillia Hall of Fame in 1966. Wood taught at Central Technical School in Toronto, for twenty-eight years.

The National Gallery of Canada's director from 1959–1965, Charles Comfort, stated in his eulogy to Wood;

"The death of Elizabeth Wyn Wood on January 27th, 1966, has removed from our midst a distinguished Canadian Sculptor and a vital and imaginative personality. … All of her work, no matter how large or how small, has a monumental simplicity. Simplicity is not an end it itself, but Elizabeth Wyn Wood’s simplifications are magnificent attempts to bring order and control into an environment of distraction. Her search for the image in the material, her purification of form and contour, reveal a spirit of great nobility and composure. … The Canadian art world mourns a great artist and I, personally, the loss of a valued and lifelong friend."

== Legacy ==
In 2026, thr Art Gallery of Ontario exhibited three of her sculptures, recent acquisitions, in an exhibition of her work curated by Renée van der Avoird.
