= Henri Hébert (sculptor) =

Canadian artist (1884–1950)

- Born: April 3, 1884; Montreal, PQ
- Died: May 11, 1950 (aged 66); Montreal
- Education: Hébert studied with Edmond Dyonnet at the Monument National, Montreal in 1896 and in 1902, with William Brymner. In the intervening years, he studied in France at different institutions, including the Ecole des Beaux Arts
- Known for: sculptor

Henri Hébert RCA LL. D. (April 3, 1884 – May 11, 1950) was a well-known sculptor in his day, known for his portrait busts and sculptural monuments.

== Biography ==
Henri Hébert was born in Montreal, the son of sculptor Louis-Philippe Hébert and Maria Roy and brother to Adrien Hébert. (Note: In The Studio as Art: Histories of Artists' Studios in Québec, Laurier Lacroix included Adrien Hébert's Le Dîner dans l'atelier (Montreal Museum of Fine Arts), c. 1941 [Lunch in the Studio], a painting which shows his brother Henri serving the meal with the help of a woman.) He received his early education in France, then back in Canada, he studied with Edmond Dyonnet at the Monument National, Montreal in 1896 and in 1902, with William Brymner at the Art Association of Montreal. In the intervening years, he studied in France at different institutions, including the Ecole des Beaux Arts. In Canada, from 1909 on, he taught at McGill University in Montreal. In 1923, he taught modeling at the Conseil des arts et manufactures, at the Monument National.

Hébert was committed to modern art in his own work and that of others. He joined a circle of friends to start the first art and literature avant-garde Québec magazine called "Le Nigog" in 1918.

He sculpted some 20 portrait busts and decorative works for private and public buildings, including bas-reliefs for McGill University. Among the most well-known are the ones he did of Evangeline (Grand Pré, NS) in collaboration with his father, his Louis-Hippolyte La Fontaine, located in Montreal's La Fontaine Park, and his war memorial in Outremont (1925) (Montreal).

He was a co-founder of the Sculptors Society of Canada (1928) and a member of the Royal Canadian Academy of Arts (R.C.A. 1922), a Fellow of the Royal Society of Arts (F.R.S.A. 1939);and he received an Honorary Doctorate from the University of Montreal (1940). He is represented in the collections of the National Gallery of Canada, Ottawa; the Musée national des beaux-arts du Québec; and the Montreal Museum of Fine Arts.
