= Frances Loring =

Canadian sculptor

- Born: October 14, 1887; Wardner, Idaho, United States
- Died: February 5, 1968 (aged 80); Newmarket, Ontario, Canada
- Education: Art Institute of Chicago
- Known for: sculptor
- Notable work: Queen Elizabeth Way Monument
- Partner: Florence Wyle

Frances Norma Loring RCA LL. D. (October 14, 1887– February 5, 1968) was a Canadian sculptor.

== Biography ==
Loring was born in Wardner, Idaho, on October 14, 1887 to mining engineer Frank Curtis Loring (1859–1938) and Charlotte Moore. She studied at multiple schools including the Ecole des Beaux-Arts in Switzerland, the Academie Colarossi in Paris, the Art Institute of Chicago, the School of the Museum of Fine Arts at Tufts in Boston, and at the Art Students League of New York.

At the Art Institute of Chicago Loring met Florence Wyle with whom she was to have a lifelong partnership. In 1909, Loring moved to New York City and was soon joined by Wyle. The first of the three studio homes they would share over their lives was located on MacDougal Alley, a lively artist colony in the heart of Greenwich Village. Living at no. 6, a converted stable with additional living space, they sculpted well-known portrait busts of each other.

In 1913, Loring and Wyle moved to Toronto, where they began being referred to as "The Girls." As curators observe, such an appelation is one of "pre-sexual, adolescent identity", suitable to the ultraconservative Toronto of the day. It had overtones of homosexuality.

Both of them quickly became major forces in the city and across the country, getting major commissions during World War I and II. In Toronto they rented a studio-home that occupied the top-floor above a carpenters shop at the corner of Church and Lombard Street called Hunters Inn. Eight years later, in 1920, Frances (aged 33) and Florence (aged 39) bought "The Church" at 110 Glenrose Avenue in the Moore Park neighborhood. The Loring-Wyle Parkette, located a block north of "The Church," at the northeast corner of Mount Pleasant Road and St. Clair Avenue East, is now home to their sculpture busts of each other. In 1928, Loring and Wyle were founding members of the Sculptors' Society of Canada with Alfred Laliberté, Elizabeth Wyn Wood, Wood's teacher and husband Emanuel Hahn and Henri Hébert. In addition to being their studio-home, The Church became the official head office for the Sculptors' Society of Canada and a gathering place for Toronto's artistic community. A. Y. Jackson called The Church "the most fascinating gathering place in the country" and it has been described as the closest Toronto came to having a Bohemian salon. Robertson Davies based characters on them and The Church in The Cunning Man.

Loring was made a member of the Royal Canadian Academy of Arts and was one of the chief organizer of the Federation of Canadian Artists and the Canada Council of the Arts. Her work was often exhibited by many institutions such as the Royal Canadian Academy of Arts, the Ontario Society of Artists, the Sculptors Society of Canada and the Women's Art Association of Canada. In 1960, works by Loring along with those of Edmund Alleyn, Graham Coughtry, Jean Paul Lemieux and Albert Dumouchel represented Canada at the Venice Biennale.

== Artistic career ==
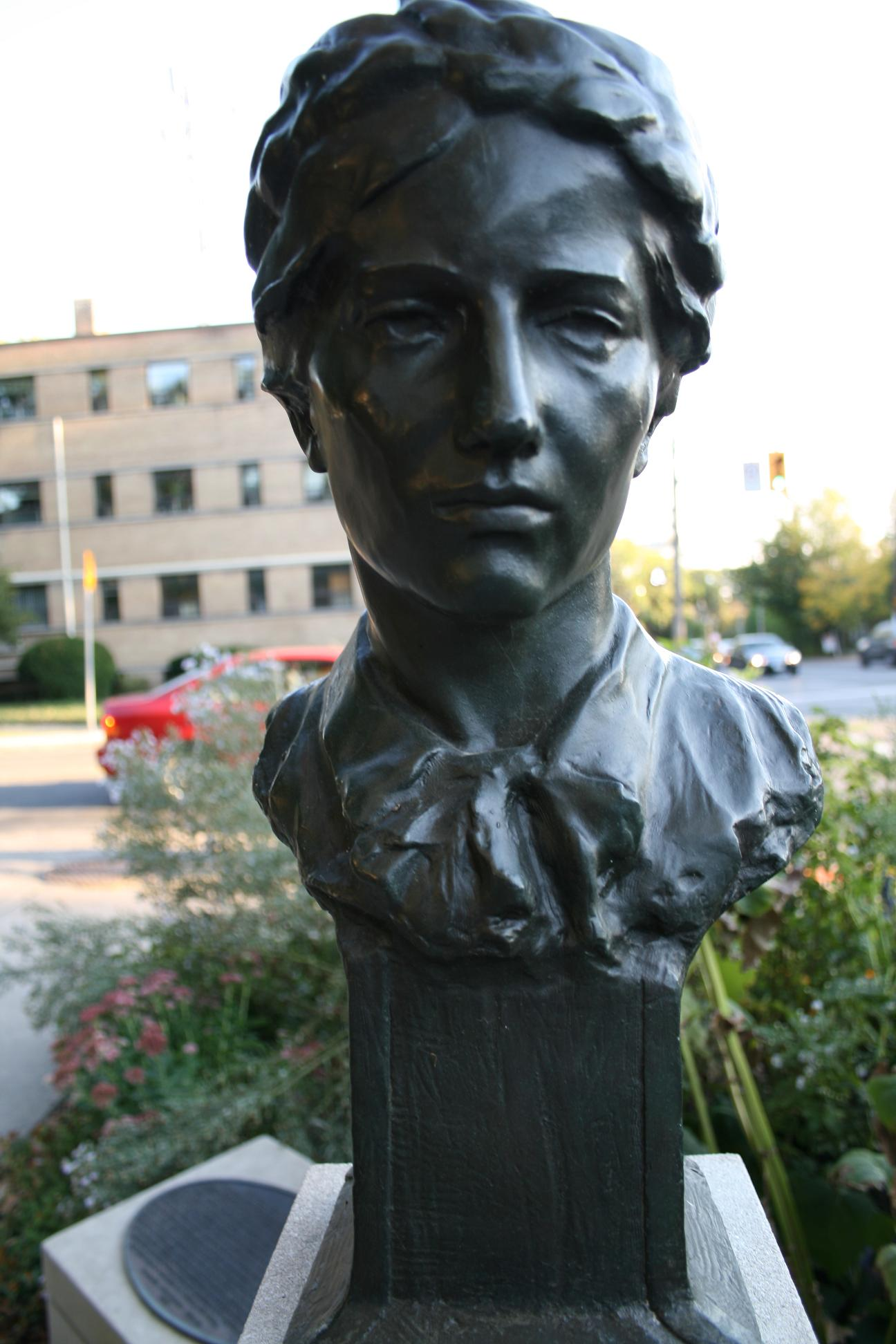
Florence Wyle

Frances Loring created hundreds of different pieces of art in a large variety of materials, including public monuments, sculptures and memorials during the First World War, war memorials after the war, architectural sculptures, portraits, and garden sculptures. Commissions included those by the Canadian War Memorial Fund and the City of Toronto government to create sculptures of women on the Canadian home front. For the Queen Elizabeth Way Monument, a monument for Queen Elizabeth and her husband, King George VI, Loring designed and carved the lion and column, and Wyle carved the much smaller King and Queen in relief. Known as the Lion Monument and as the Loring Lion, has been located in Casimir Gzowski Park in Toronto, Ontario, since 1975. Loring also created a portrait of Prime Minister Robert Borden in bronze and various war memorials in Cambridge, Ontario.

In 1965, Loring and Wyle made mirroring wills that called for the creation of The Sculpture Fund, an acquisition fund for museums, galleries and places of learning to purchase sculpture. They died three weeks apart in 1968. While their intention was to leave all their money from estate sales to support a new generation of Canadians sculptors by buying their sculptures and displaying them in public galleries across the country. The fund has "had a significant impact on the art of sculpture in … [Canada] and continues to inspire both admirers and artists alike".

== Works ==
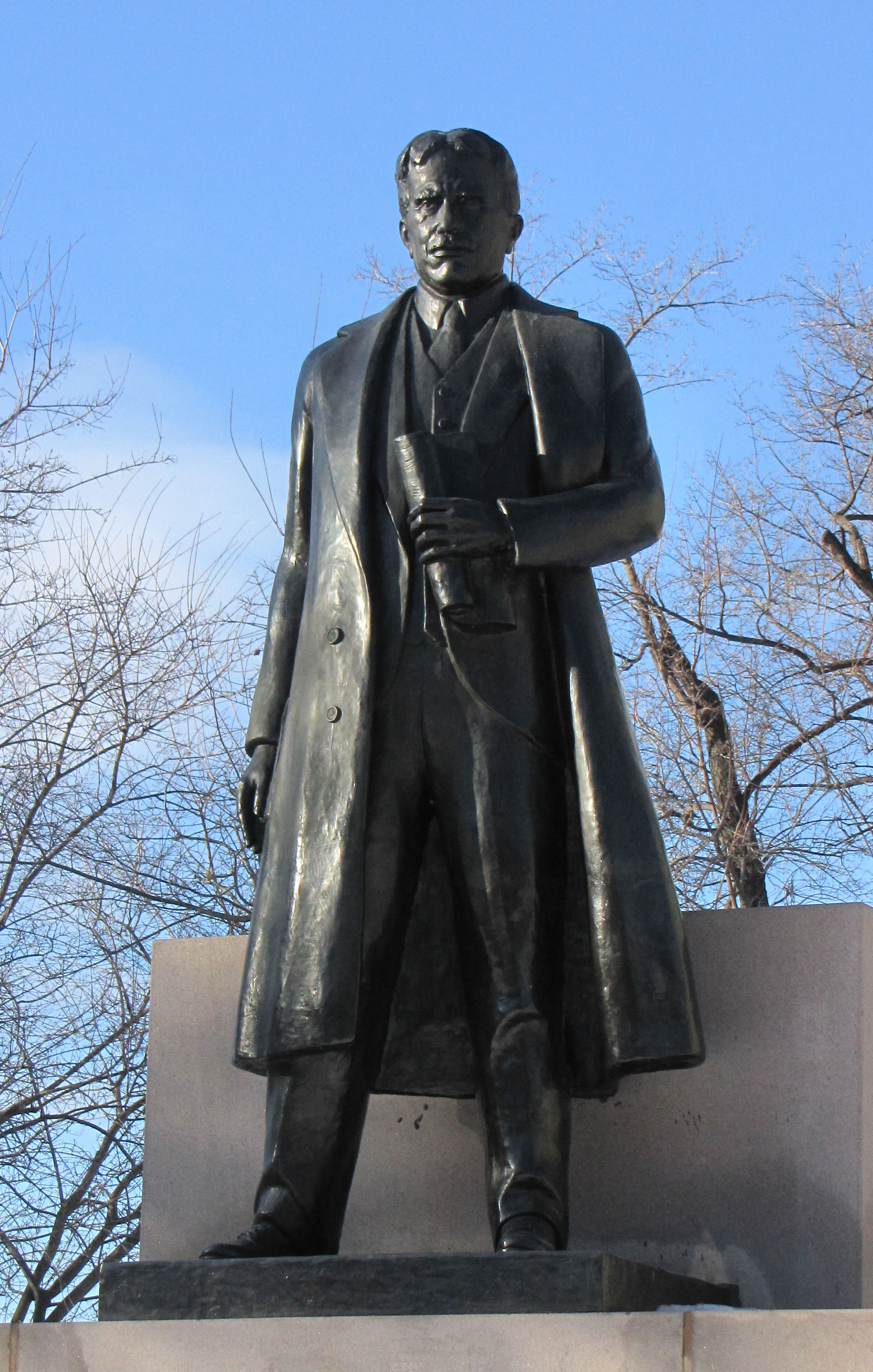
Frances Loring's Sir Robert Borden (1957) at Parliament Hill Ottawa, Ontario

Frances Loring's Lion sculpture at the base of the Queen Elizabeth Way Monument

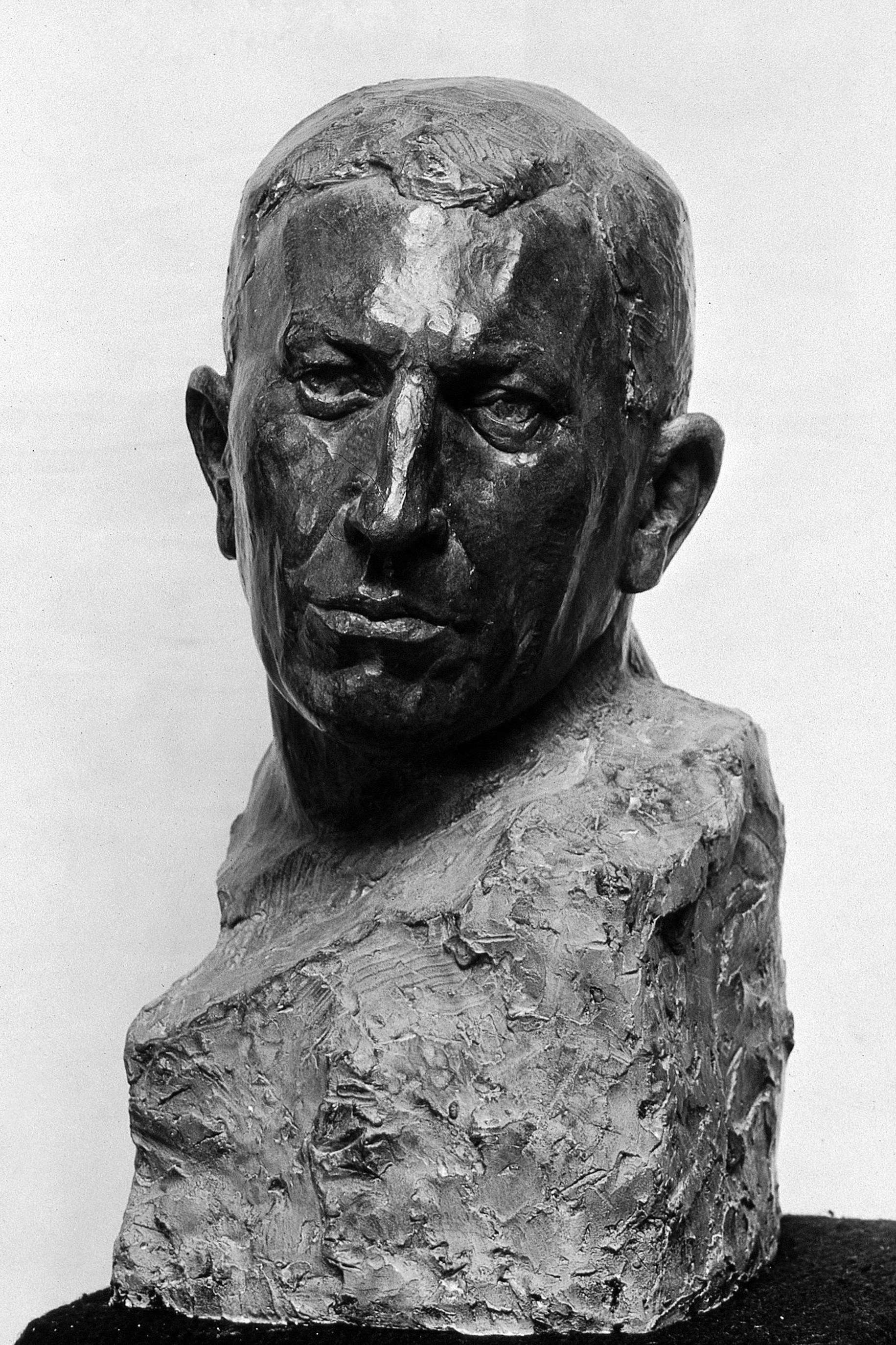
Head of Sir Frederick Banting - National Gallery of Canada
