= Auguste Nicolas =

French Roman Catholic apologetical writer

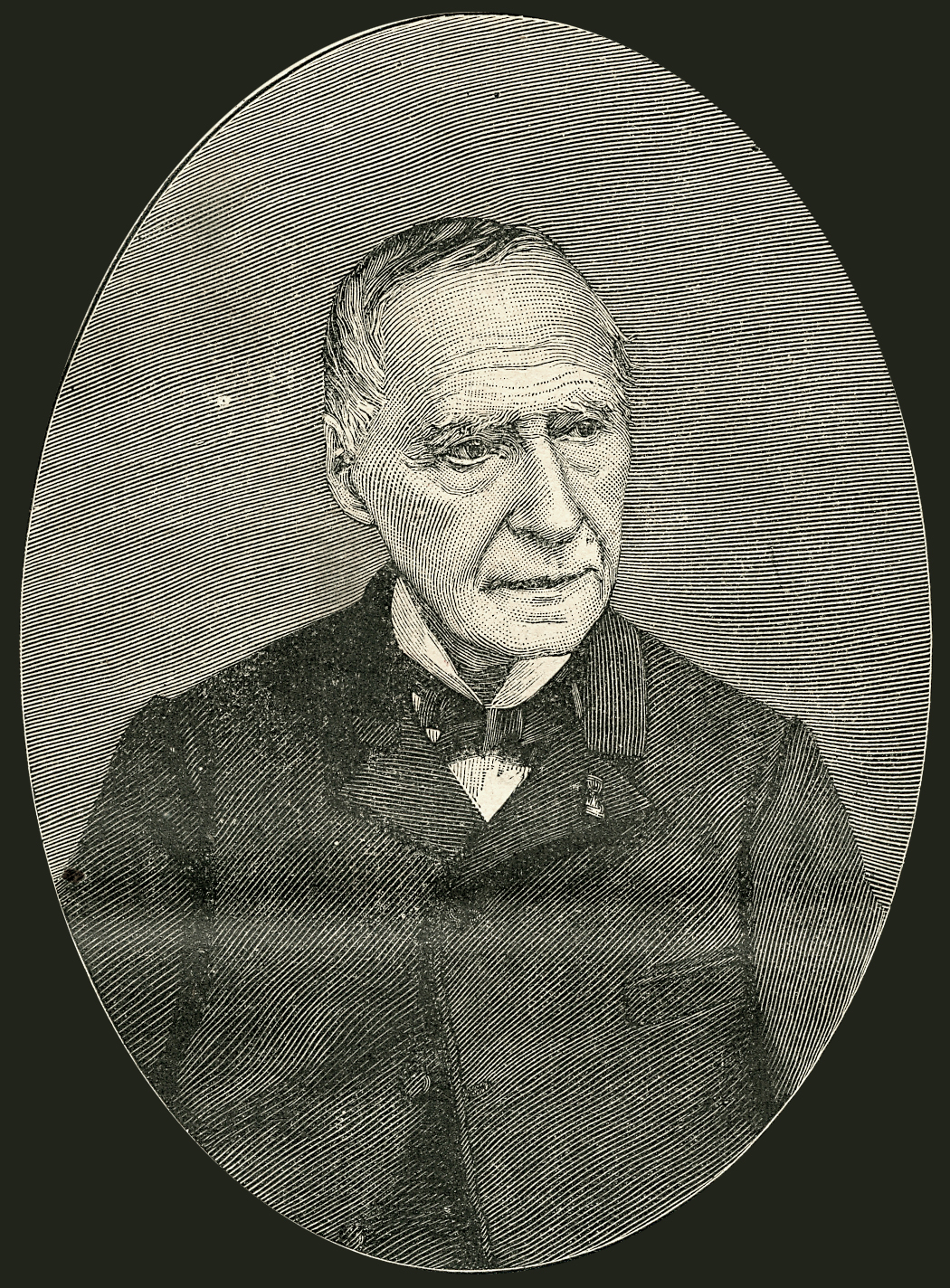
Auguste Nicolas

Auguste Nicolas (6 January 1807 – 18 January 1888) was a French Roman Catholic apologetical writer.

== Life ==
Nicolas was born at Bordeaux. He first studied law, was admitted as an advocate and entered the magistracy. From 1841 to 1849 he was justice of the peace at Bordeaux.

From 1842 he began the publication of his apologetical writings which soon made his reputation among Catholics. When in 1849 M. de Falloux became minister of public worship he summoned Nicolas to assist him as head of the department for the administration of the temporal interests of ecclesiastical districts. He held this office until 1854 when he became general inspector of libraries. In 1860 he was appointed judge of the tribunal of the Seine and finally councillor at the Paris court of appeals. He died at Versailles.

== Author ==
Nicolas employed his leisure and later his retirement to write works in defense of Christianity taken as a whole or in its most important dogmas. He lived in a period when Traditionalism still dominated many French Catholics, and this is reflected in his works. Otherwise the author addressed himself to the general public and especially to the middle classes which were still penetrated with Voltairian disbelief, and he succeeded in reaching them.

He aimed no doubt at defending religion by means of philosophy, good sense, and arguments from authority; but he also often appeals to the traditions and the groping moral sense of man-kind at large. He showed his conception of apologetics by adapting to the dispositions and the needs of the minds of his time. The testimonies, however, which he cites, are often apocryphal; and frequently also he interprets them uncritically, and ascribes to them a meaning or a scope which they do not possess.

His apologetics became obsolescent, when ecclesiastical and critical studies were revived in France and elsewhere. His writings also betray at times the layman lacking in the learning and precision of the theologian, and some of his books were in danger of being placed on the Index. Some bishops, however, among them Cardinal Donnet and Cardinal Pie, intervened in his behalf and certified to his intentions.

== Bibliography ==
His books were very successful in France and in Germany, where some of them were translated. Among his works were the following:

- Etudes philosophiques sur le Christianisme (Paris, 1841–45), a philosophical apology for the chief Christian dogmas, which reached a twenty-sixth edition before the death of the author
- La Vierge Marie et le plan divin, nouvelles études philosophiques sur le Christianisme (4 vols., Paris, 1852, 1853, 1861), in which is explained the role of the Blessed Virgin in the plan of Redemption, and which was translated into German, and reached the eighth edition during the author's lifetime
- Du protestantisme et de toutes les hérésies dans leur rapport avec le socialisme (Paris, 1852, 2 vols., 8 editions)
- L'Art de croire, ou préparation philosophique au Christianisme (Paris, 1866–67), translated into German
- La Divinité de Jésus-Christ, démonstration nouvelle (1864)
- Jésus Christ introduction à l'Evangile étudié et medité à l'usage des temps nouveaux (Paris, 1875)

Semi-religious and semi-political were:

- La Monarchie et la question du drapeau (Paris, 1873)
- La Révolution et l'orde chrétien (Paris, 1874)
- L'Etat contre Dieu (Paris, 1879)
- Rome et la Papauté (Paris, 1883)

Works in historico-philosophic vein:

- Etude sur Maine de Biran (Paris, 1858)
- Etude sur Eugénie de Guérin (Paris, 1863)
- Mémoires d'un père sur la vie et la mort de son fils (Paris, 1869)
- Etude historique et critique sur le Père Lacordaire (Toulouse, 1886)
