= Sculptors Society of Canada =

The Sculptors Society of Canada (SSC) promotes and exhibits contemporary Canadian sculpture.

Founded by Canadian sculptors Frances Loring, Florence Wyle, Elizabeth Wyn Wood, Wood's teacher and husband Emanuel Hahn, Henri Hébert and Alfred Laliberté, the Sculptors Society of Canada has been exhibiting sculpture in Canada since 1928, particularly in Montreal, Ottawa and Toronto.

The Canadian Sculpture Centre is the Society's public exhibit gallery, and was previously located at 500 Church Street (before 2019), in the Distillery District (2019—2024) and at 95 Moatfield Dr in North York (2024-2025). It is currently located at 260 Spadina Avenue (since 2025) in Toronto.
