= Emanuel Hahn =

German-Canadian sculptor (1881–1957)

Emanuel Otto Hahn RCA
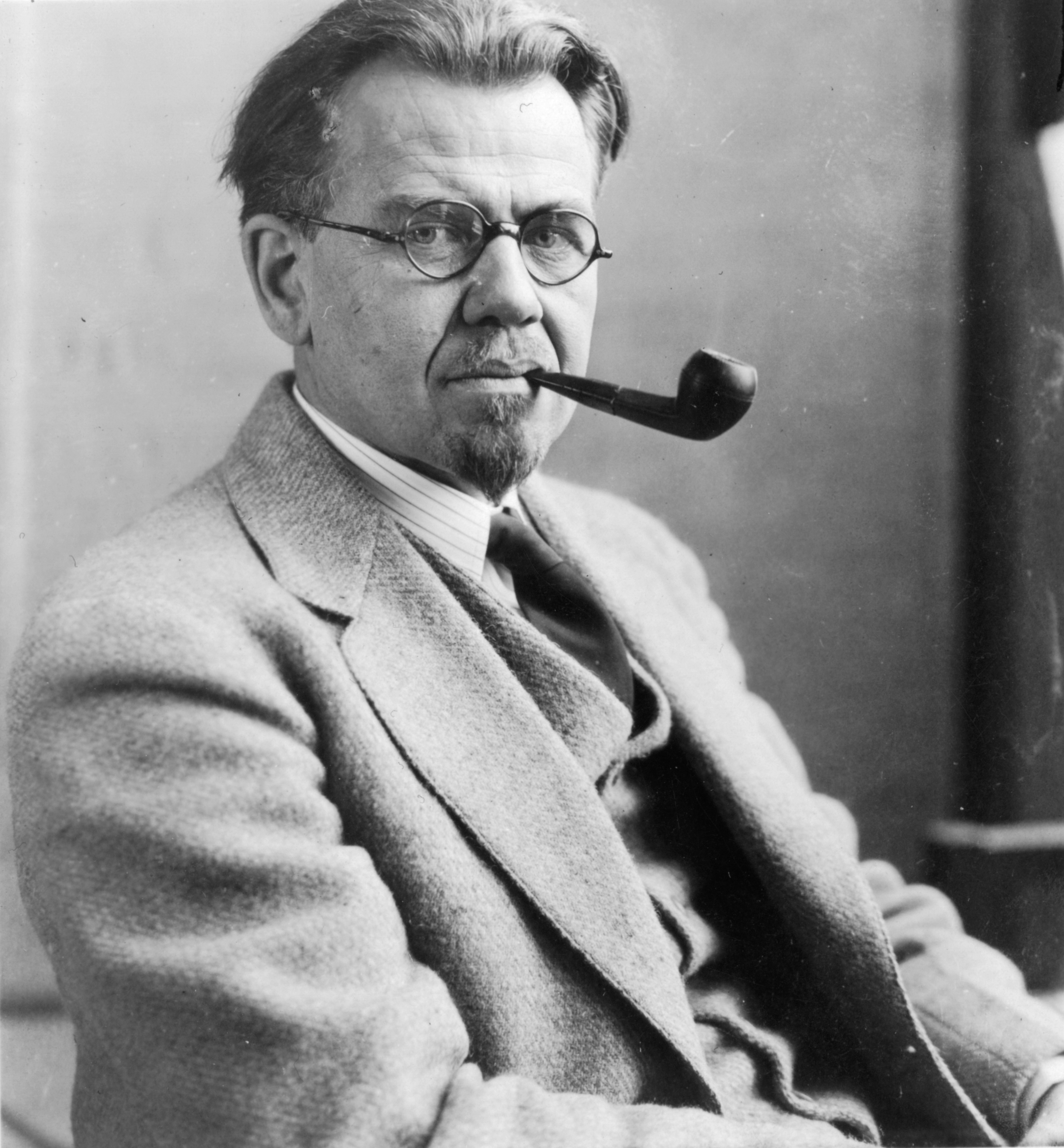
- Born: 30 May 1881; Reutlingen, Kingdom of Württemberg, German Empire
- Died: 14 February 1957 (aged 75); Toronto, Ontario, Canada
- Known for: Sculptor and coin designer

Emanuel Otto Hahn RCA (30 May 1881 – 14 February 1957) was a German-born Canadian sculptor and coin designer. He taught and later married Elizabeth Wyn Wood. He co-founded and was the first president of the Sculptors' Society of Canada.

== Biography ==
=== Education and training ===
Hahn was born in Reutlingen (today a part of Baden-Württemberg, Germany) and moved to Toronto in 1888 with his family. He studied modelling and commercial design at the Toronto Technical School and Ontario College of Art as well as Industrial Design from 1899 to 1903. In 1901, he was hired by the McIntosh Marble and Granite Company where he created the bronze reliefs on various monuments. Hahn then went on to study in Stuttgart, Germany in 1903, he pursued art and design at the local school of art and design and the Polytechnical School, and briefly apprenticed in the studio of a sculptor teaching at the academy.

From 1908 to 1912 Hahn was a studio assistant to sculptor Walter Seymour Allward, helping in the construction of Allward's South African War Memorial in Toronto, the Alexander Graham Bell Telephone Memorial in Brantford Ontario, and the Baldwin-Lafontaine Monument on Parliament Hill in Ottawa. In 1912 he was hired as a modeling instructor at the Ontario College of Art, ultimately heading the sculpture department until his retirement in 1951.

He was made a member of the Royal Canadian Academy of Arts.

=== Personal life ===
Hahn married his former student Elizabeth Wyn Wood in 1926. The couple had one daughter and lived in Toronto at 159 Glen Road. and died in Toronto in 1957.

=== Career and official commissions ===
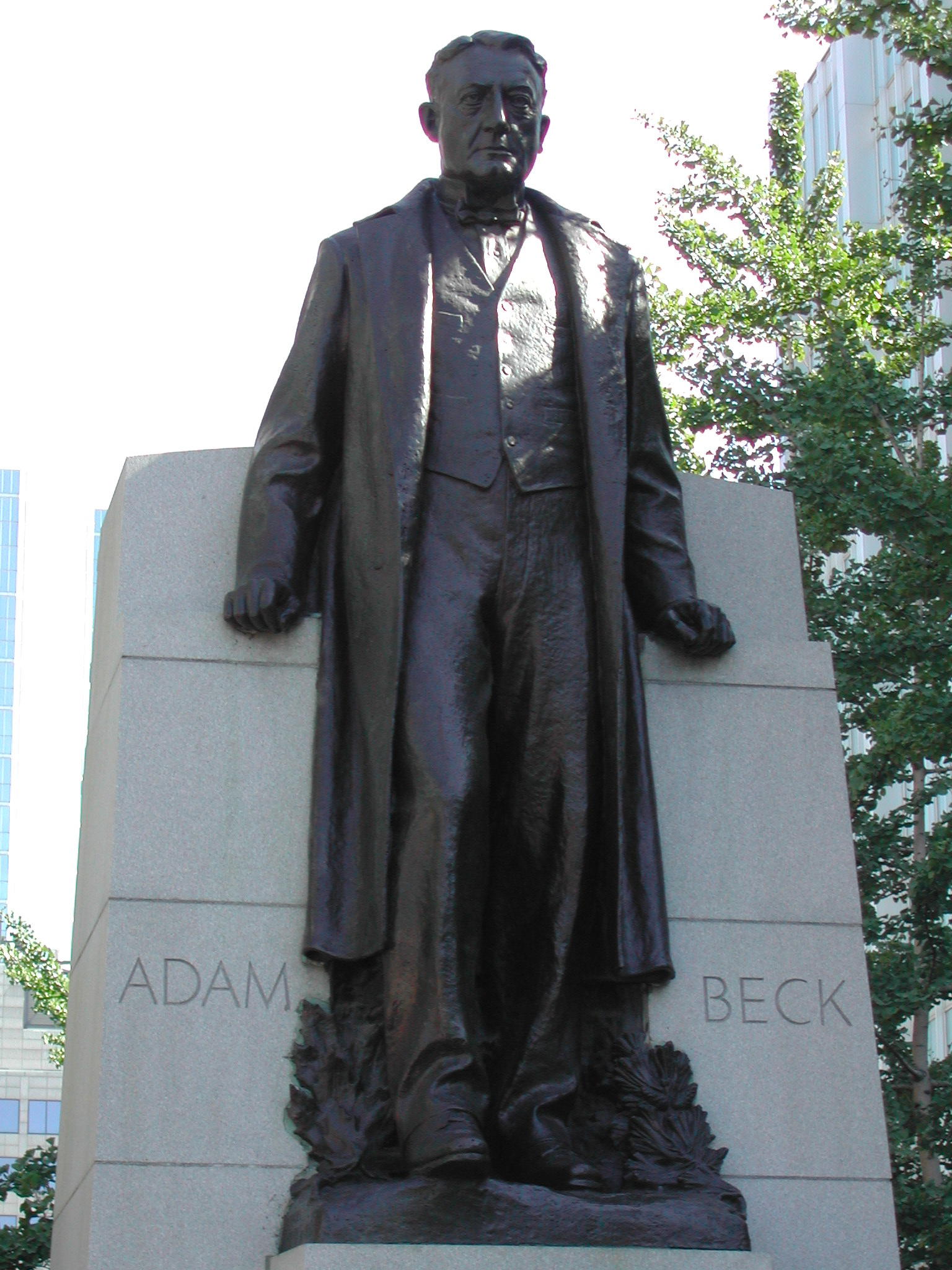
Emanuel Hahn's Sir Adam Beck Memorial (1934) on University Avenue at Queen Street West in Toronto

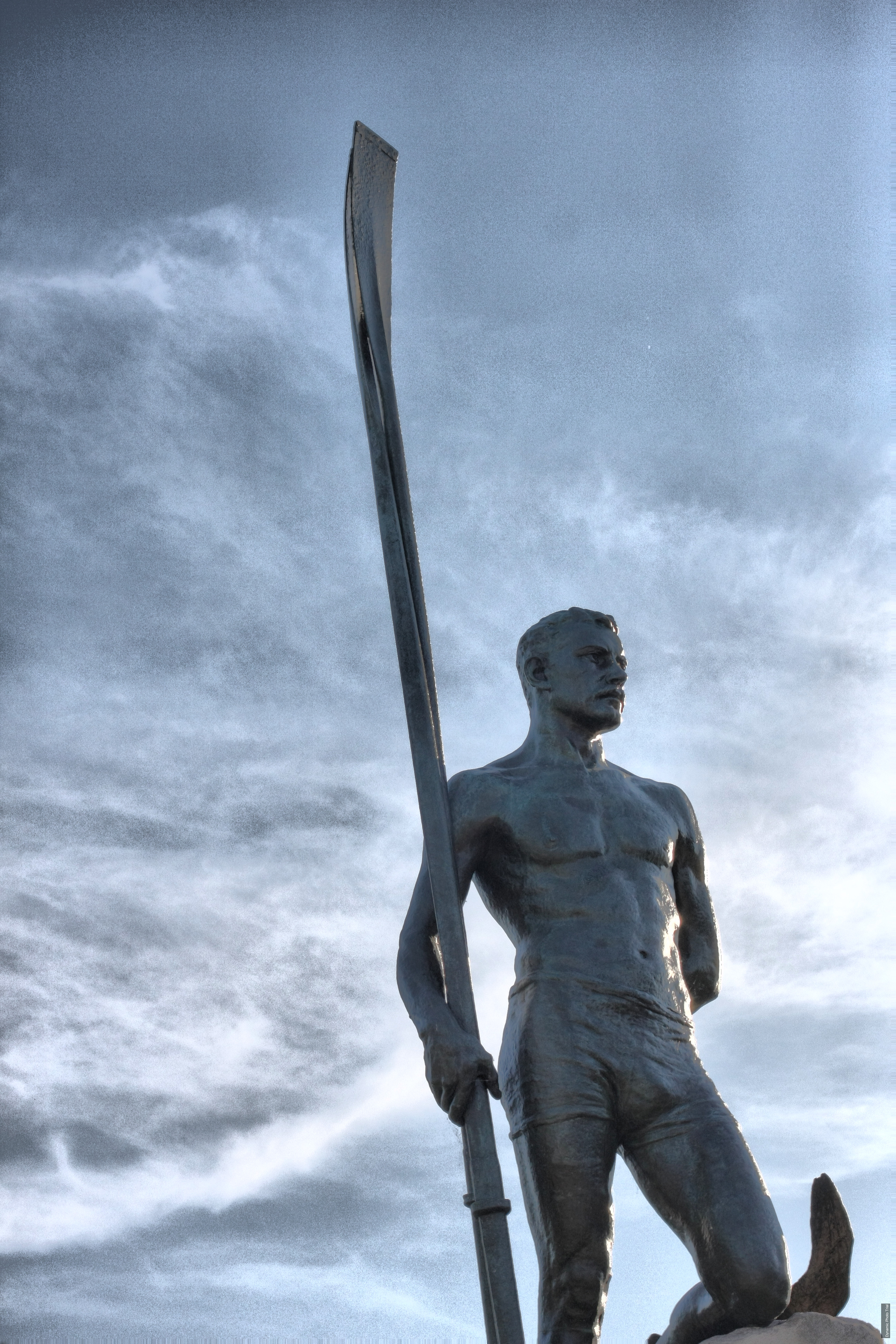
Emanuel Hahn's monument to Ned Hanlan (1926) on the Toronto Islands

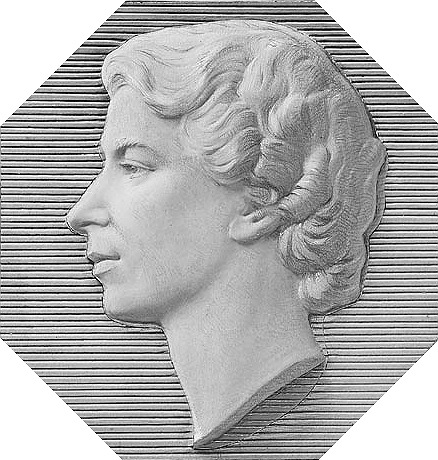
Emanuel Hahn's design for Canadian stamps issued in 1953 for the coronation of Queen Elizabeth II

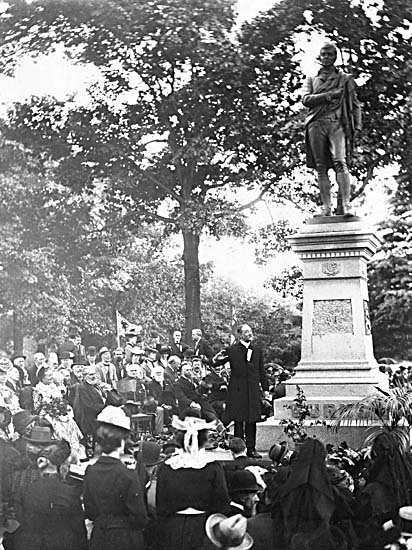
Emanuel Hahn's Robert Burns monument (1902) in Allan Gardens, Toronto

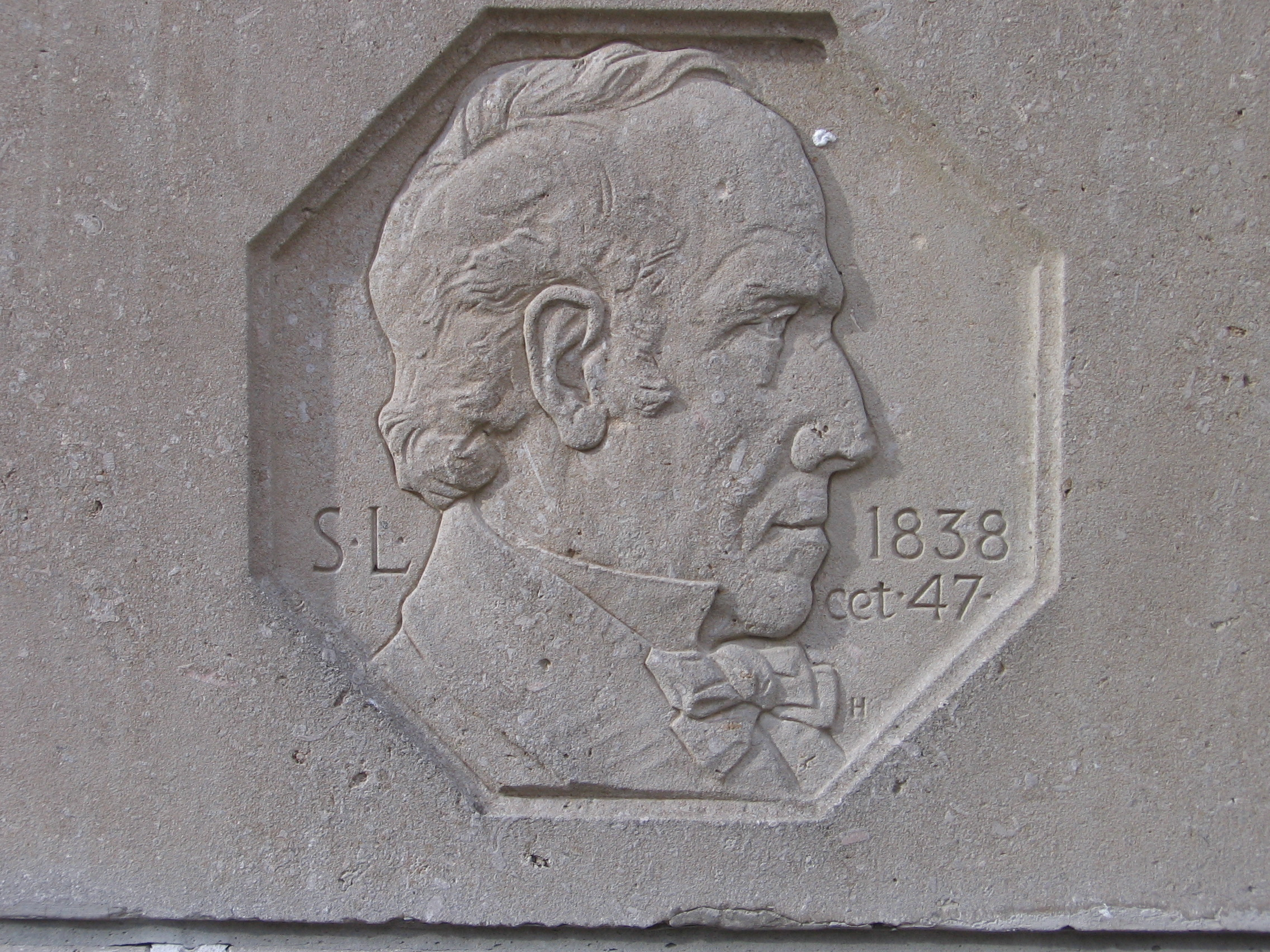
Emanuel Hahn's Memorial to Samuel Lount (1938) at Mackenzie House, Toronto

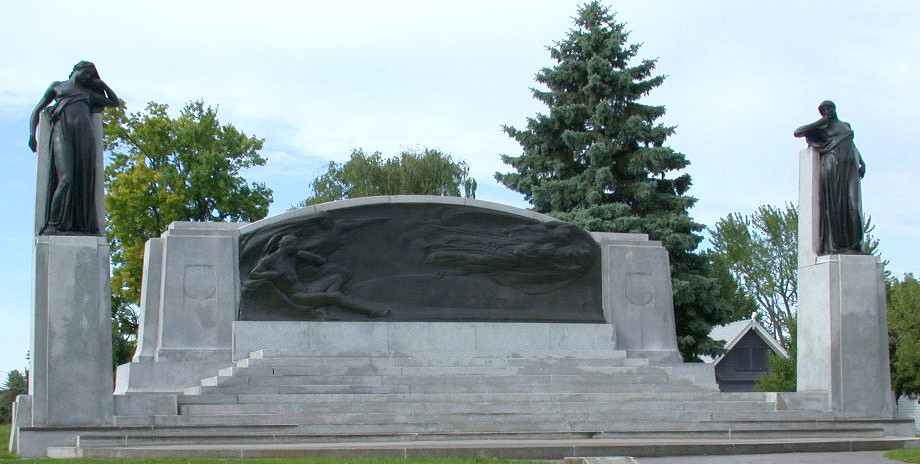
Bell Telephone Memorial, Brantford Ontario, a monument Hahn worked on with W.S. Allward, unveiled 24 October 1917

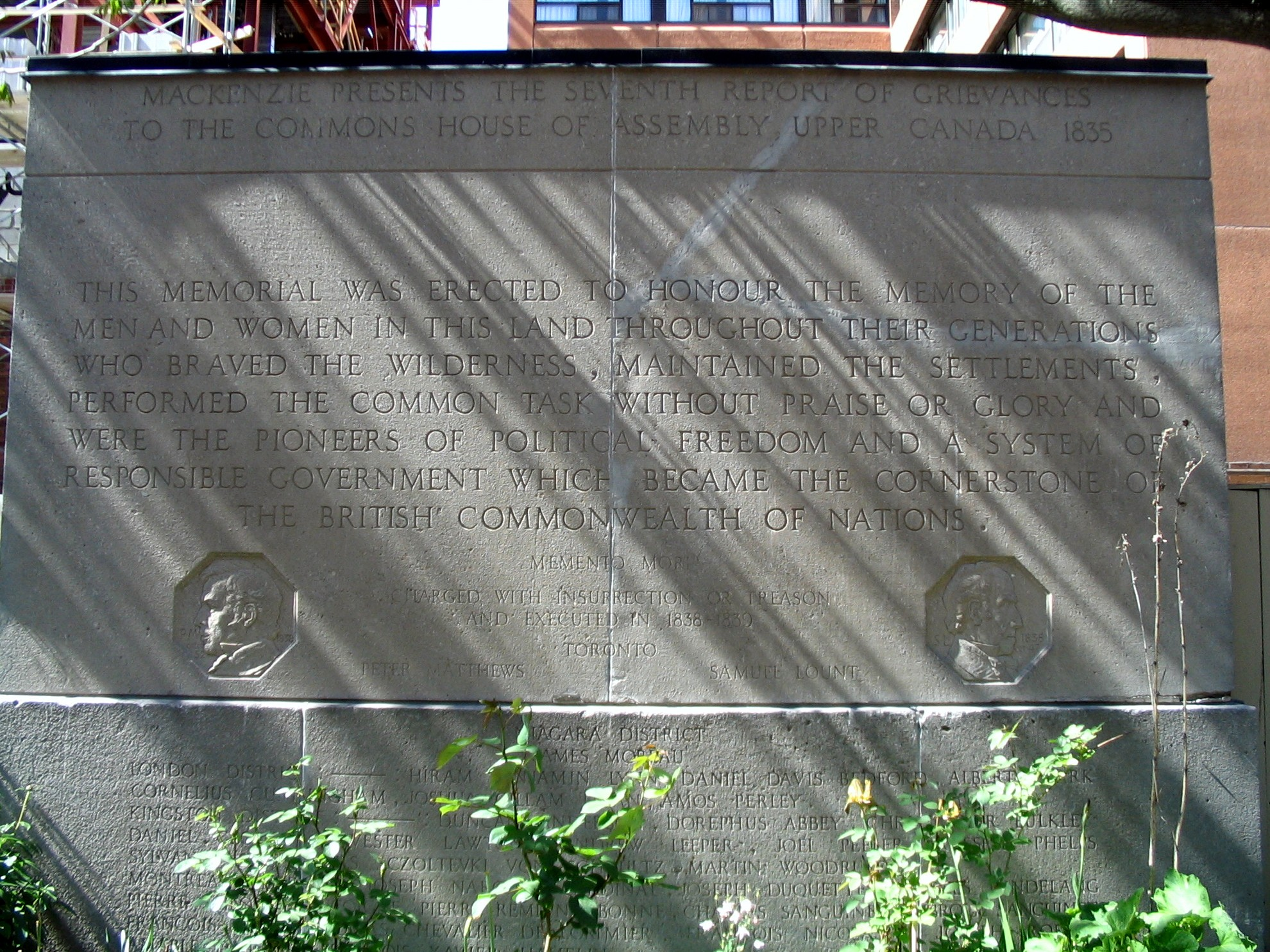
Emanuel Hahn's "Mackenzie Panels" (1938) in the garden of Mackenzie House, Toronto

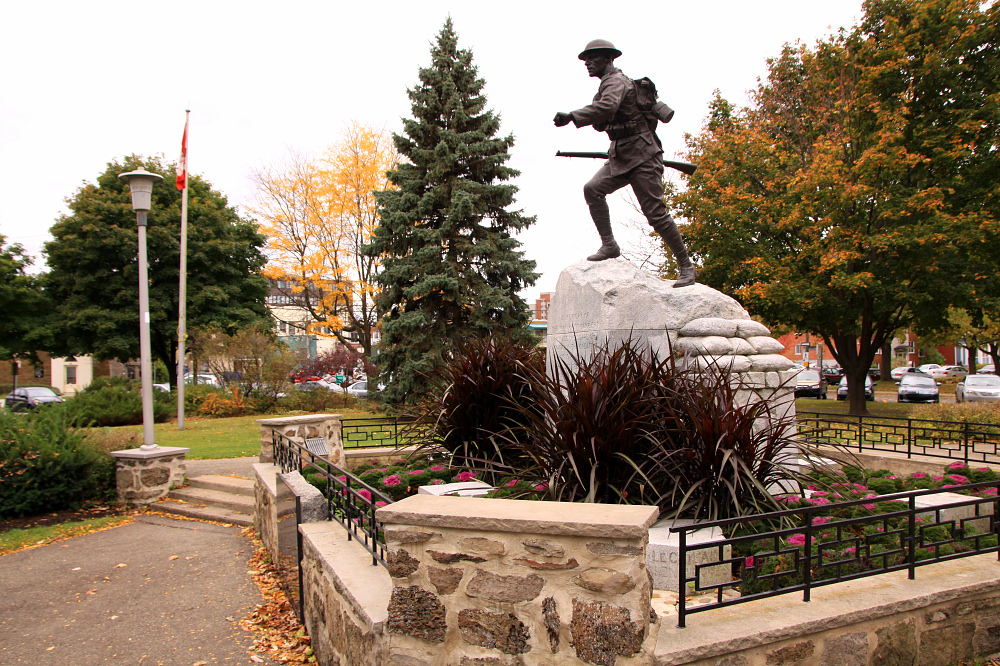
The Saint-Lambert, Quebec Cenotaph by Emanuel Hahn, inaugurated on July 9, 1922, by General Sir Arthur Currie
- In 1916, a monument designed by Salvation Army Major Gideon Miller, and sculpted by Emanuel Hahn was dedicated to Salvationists who died in the sinking of the RMS Empress of Ireland 29 May 1914, was unveiled. Every year, the church holds a special service of remembrance at the memorial in Mount Pleasant Cemetery, Toronto on the Sunday closest to 29 May.
- Hahn's statue of a grieving soldier for the War Memorial, Westville, Nova Scotia was replicated for several other monuments, including the cenotaph in Gaspé, Quebec.

After the First World War Hahn gained fame for his war memorial designs as communities sought to honour their veterans with cenotaphs and memorial sculptures. He designed a monument on the theme of a realistic soldier figure "going over the top" in Saint-Lambert, Quebec and a meditating figure of Tommy in his Greatcoat in Lindsay, Ontario. Hahn's winning proposal for the city of Winnipeg's war memorial caused a national controversy when the sculptor's German ancestry was revealed in 1925. Hahn was forced to relinquish the commission, although he was able to keep the prize money. Controversy erupted again when the competition was reopened and his wife Elizabeth Wyn Wood won the contract for the memorial. Critics condemned Wood for using her maiden name in the competition and accused her of copying her husband's design. She was also forced to withdraw from the contract and the memorial was awarded to the third-place winner.

Hahn's career was not significantly harmed, however, since he received wide press coverage, some of which condemned the city of Winnipeg because Hahn was a naturalized Canadian citizen. The following year he was awarded the contract for the Edward Hanlan monument (1926), erected on the Canadian National Exhibition grounds, and moved to the Toronto Islands in 2004. In 1929 he won the competition for a memorial to Sir Adam Beck, his most important and largest monumental project, unveiled in 1934 on University Avenue, Toronto.

Hahn was a member of The Arts and Letters Club of Toronto and served as the first President of the Sculptors' Society of Canada, which he established with Frances Loring, Florence Wyle and Elizabeth Wyn Wood in 1928. Membership in the sculptors' society permitted Hahn to exhibit smaller sculptures independently of museums and galleries.

Hahn contributed two architectural stone sculpture panels for the Bank of Montreal Toronto headquarters building of 1948. These were recovered when the building was demolished in 1972 and are now displayed in the garden of Guild Park and Gardens, along with other panels commissioned for the building.

The Ontario Heritage Foundation plaque for the South African War Memorial (Toronto) erroneously states that Walter Seymour Allward studied under Emanuel Hahn, when in fact it was the contrary. James Saull, who constructed the Oak Bay, British Columbia Cenotaph in 1948, studied under Emanuel Hahn.

Hahn's last work is likely the Robert H. Saunders Memorial, a bas relief marker located on University Avenue south of College Street in 1957.

== Coin design ==
Among the coins of Canada, Hahn designed the voyageur dollar, which depicts a fur-trapper (coureur de bois) from the Hudson's Bay Company and a First Nations man in a canoe with the Northern Lights in the background; the Nova Scotia racing schooner Bluenose on the 10¢ coin; the caribou head on the 25¢ coin; and the Canadian Parliament Buildings reverse of the 1939 royal tour of Canada silver dollar.

== Portraits by other artists ==
Hahn was the subject of a larger than life-size (56 cm) bust by his former student Elizabeth Bradford Holbrook entitled Head of Emanuel Hahn. The sculpture was purchased by the National Gallery of Canada in 1962 for its permanent collection.

== See also ==
- Gustav Hahn, his brother
- Bell Telephone Memorial
- List of German Canadians
