= Alma Frances McCollum =

Canadian poet and composer

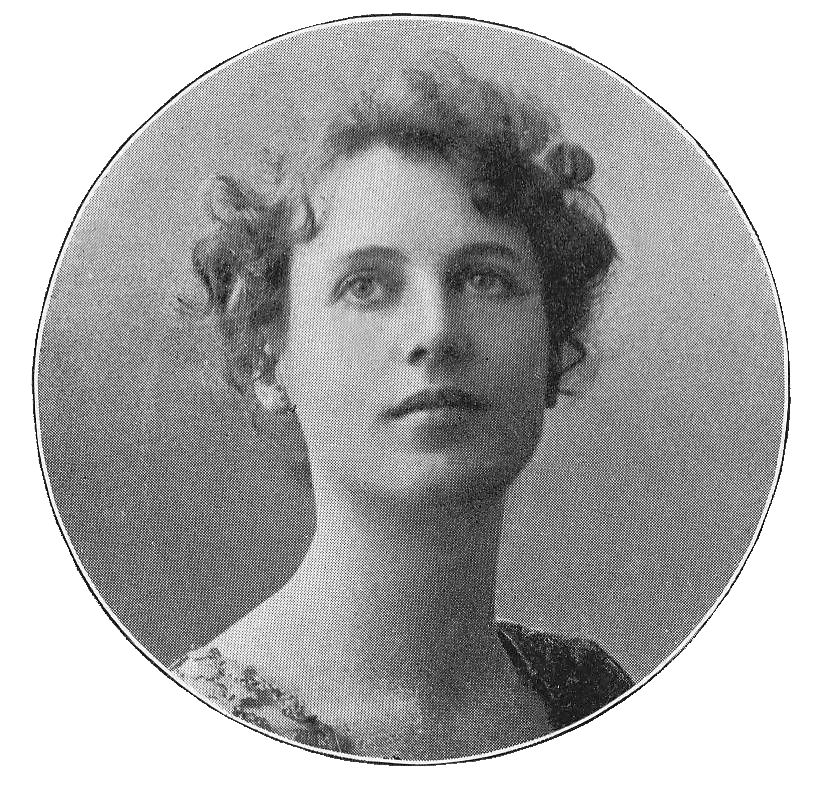
- Born: Alma Frances McCollum; 7 December 1879; Chatham, Ontario, Canada
- Died: 21 March 1906 (aged 26); Toronto, Canada
- Occupations: Poet, composer

Alma Frances McCollum (7 December 1879, near Chatham, Ontario – 21 March 1906, Toronto) was a Canadian poet and composer. She is best known for her collection of poems Flower Legends and Other Poems (1902).

== Early life and education ==
Alma Frances McCollum was born on 7 December 1879, in a village near Chatham, Ontario to Edward Lee Collum (1826 – 1887) and Mary Ann Sharpe (1833 – 1919). She was the youngest daughter of six in her family. Her parents both were born and brought up in Ireland. Her father, Edward Lee Collum, died when McCollum was still a child, and the family moved to Peterborough, Ontario, where they lived till 1905 before moving to Toronto.

McCollum graduated from the Collegiate Institute at Peterborough and studied at the Toronto Presbyterian Ladies College, as well as in Cambridge, Massachusetts.

== Career ==
McCollum early started making rhymes and wrote most of the poems in her teen years. A collection of her poems named Flower Legends and Other Poems was published in 1902. The cover design of the book was sketched by McCollum herself. The book was positively accepted by the Toronto literary community, namely Ethelwyn Wetherald, Jean Blewett, and J. W. Garvin.

Having moved to Toronto she received musical training at the School of Expression in the Toronto Conservatory of Music and wrote plays for children. She also took lectures in English Literature at University College, but after brief attendance she had to discontinue her studies due to health problems.

== Death and legacy ==
McCollum was diagnosed with incipient appendicitis, and during the operation on 21 March 1906 she died at the age of 26.

Her book Flower Legends and Other Stories (1902) and its reprints can be found in libraries throughout the world, including The British Library, McGrill University Library, Plymouth State University Library and others.

Her poems are also anthologized in following collections: Campbell, Oxford Book of Canadian Verse (1913); Caswell, Canadian Singers and Their Songs (1925); Garvin, Canadian Poets (1916); Garvin, Canadian Verse for Boys and Girls (1930); Whyte-Edgar, Wreath of Canadian Song (1910).

== Bibliography ==
=== Books ===
- Flower Legends and Other Poems (1902).

=== List of selected poems ===
- Why Blossoms Fall
- Love
- A Song of the Forest
- The Angel of the Sombre Cowl
- The Silent Singer
- Little Nellie’s Pa
- Forest Sounds
- The Angel’s Kiss
- Where Sings the Whippoorwill
