= Panabaker =

Panabaker is a surname. Notable people with the surname include:

- Danielle Panabaker (born 1987), American film and television actress
- Frank Panabaker (1904–1992), Canadian landscape painter
- Kay Panabaker (born 1990), American film and television actress, sister of Danielle
- John H. Panabaker (1928-2023), Canadian insurance executive
