= Frank Panabaker =

Canadian artist (1904-1992)

- Born: Frank Shirley Panabaker; August 16, 1904; Hespeler, Ontario, now part of Cambridge, Canada
- Died: 1992
- Education: Ontario College of Art; Grand Central School of Art in New York City (c. 1926)
- Spouse: Katherine Marks

Frank Shirley Panabaker (1904 – 1992) was a Canadian landscape painter. His work focused on Southern Ontario and the area surrounding Mount Assiniboine.

== Career ==
Frank Shirley Panabaker was born in Hespeler, Ontario, the son of the local woollen mill manager and one-time mayor of the town, now part of Cambridge. He studied art in many locations, beginning in Hespeler under Farquhar McGillivray Knowles (1859–1932) and his wife, Elizabeth McGillivray Knowles. who gave him lessons, and his father was so encouraged that he was able to attend the Ontario College of Art for two years, studying with Arthur Lismer and J.E.H. MacDonald. He continued his artistic studies at the Grand Central School of Art in New York City (c. 1926) and became a member of the Salmagundi Club and Allied Artists of America, also in New York. A self-supporting professional artist for his entire adult life, he began his painting career during the Great Depression in Hamilton, Ontario where he lived with his wife Katherine (née Marks).

He would drive across Southern Ontario, to the shores of Georgian Bay, through Haliburton, Muskoka and Algonquin Park painting in all seasons, in all kinds of weather. He ventured to paint the Rockies several years, and even travelled abroad to Nassau and the British Isles. He also marked the times by painting scenes of the Hamilton Farmer's Market, the Royal yacht Brittania in Hamilton Harbour and documenting the Steel City in all its elements and growth. He used various empty buildings in Hamilton for his one-man shows, once renting the old Birks building for an exhibition in 1933 where he sold eight paintings during the first four days. However, it was a visit to the gallery by Sara D. Roosevelt, mother of Franklin D. Roosevelt, that really boosted his fortunes as The Mail and Empire reported that Mrs. Roosevelt had purchased a small seascape. The artist sold 18 more pictures in the following two days.

Early in his lengthy career, he was hired by Cootes-Hallmark to produce a painting of a winter scene each year for its "Painters of Canada Series", to be reproduced for Christmas cards and sold nationally. In 1957, he published a book titled Reflected Lights, about his youth, travels and art.

He was a long-standing member of the Allied Artists of America (one of a handful of Canadians ever to be elected), as well as an associate member of the Royal Canadian Academy. He was a member of the board of trustees for the National Gallery of Canada in Ottawa for six years (1959-1966). He painted up until the last weeks of his life, dying at 87 in 1992.

== Selected public collections ==
- Agnes Etherington Art Centre, Kingston
- Art Gallery of Ontario, Toronto
- Art Gallery of Hamilton
- Museum London, London, Ontario

== Awards ==
In 1930, he was awarded the Jessie Dow Prize for landscape painting at the Spring exhibition of the Montreal Art Association.

== Legacy ==
In 1996, Frank Panabaker was inducted into the Hamilton Gallery of Distinction. In 2019, the Hamilton-Wentworth District School Board announced that the new school in Ancaster, Ontario replacing Fessenden Public School and Ancaster Senior Public School would be named Frank Panabaker Elementary School.
