= Heliconian Club =

Canadian non-profit association

Toronto Heliconian Club
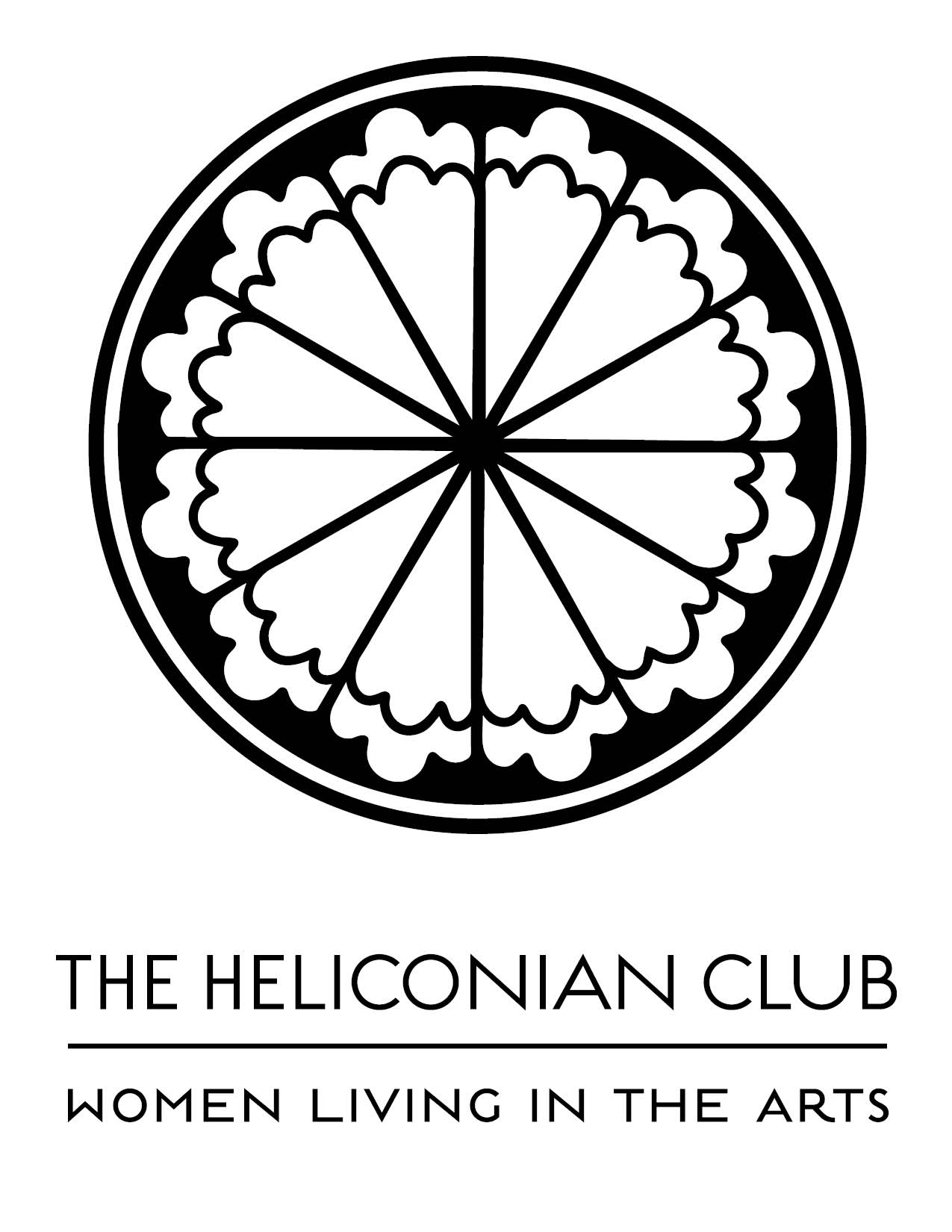
- Named after: Mount Helicon in Greece
- Founded: 1909; 117 years ago
- Type: Nonprofit organization
- Purpose: Association for women in the arts and letters
- Location(s): Heliconian Hall; 35 Hazelton Avenue; Toronto, Ontario, Canada
- Website: heliconianclub.org

Heliconian Hall
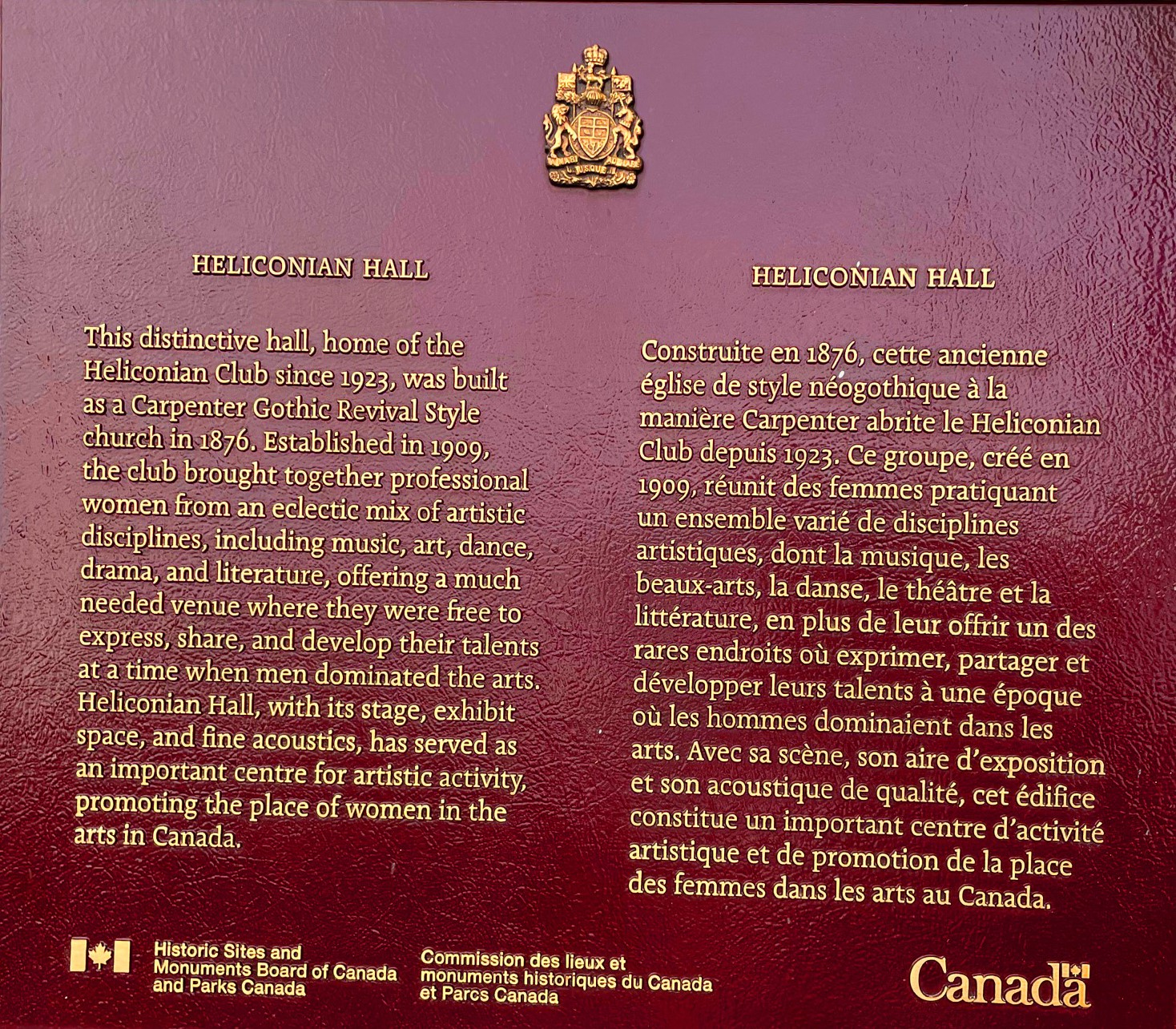
- Interactive map of Heliconian Hall
- Location: 35 Hazelton Avenue in Yorkvile

History
- Built: 1876
- Built for: Olivet Congregational Church

Site notes
- Owner: Heliconian Club (since 1923)

National Historic Site of Canada
- Designated: 2008

Ontario Heritage Act
- Designated: 1973

The Toronto Heliconian Club is a non-profit association of women involved in the arts and letters based in Toronto, Ontario. It operates out of Heliconian Hall, a historic building located in the Yorkville area of central Toronto. Founded in 1909, the Club still focuses on its original commitment to women supporting and working in the arts.

Today, the club has six sections – Drama, Dance, Humanities, Literature, Music and Visual Arts – open to all professional women working in or supporting the arts. The Club runs a Literary Lecture Series (founded in 1996) and a Concert Series, as well as a Salon Series that features speakers from across the arts spectrum. These are open to the public, with the exception of the Literary Lecture Series, which is by subscription only.

A key initiative of the Club over the last decade has been to establish artistic residencies for young female artists setting out on a professional career in Music, Literature, Visual Arts, Drama and Dance. The club offers the musician, dancer and dramatist rehearsal space at the club, and an evening in which they can perform their artistic projects at the club before a paying audience. The Visual Artist is given a solo show of her works at the end of the residency in June of each year and is able to attend weekly Sessions at the Monday Life Drawing Program free of charge. The Writer in residence is given a subscription to the Literary Lecture Series and the opportunity during her residency to share her current writing project with members of the club.

== History ==
Mary Hewitt Smart (later Shenstone), a teacher of singing at the Toronto Conservatory of Music, had helped establish the Women's Musical Club of Toronto in 1899, and during the early 1900s, she was contemplating a more ambitious project. She wanted to bring together women living and working in all the arts – not just music – for social interaction and intellectual stimulation. To that end, she and 59 fellow artists attended a formal meeting at the Teapot Inn on Wednesday, January 20, 1909. On that day, the Heliconian Club was born with Mary Smart as its first president. It was named for Mount Helicon, the mythical abode of the Muses.

The founding members were professionals in painting, music, literature and drama. The first Vice President was painter Elizabeth McGillivray Knowles. Charter members (founding members) included Jean Blewett (poet); Bessie Bonsall Barron (singer), Mona Bates (pianist), Estelle Kerr (painter), Ellen Elliott (publisher), Mary Dignam (founder of the Women's Art Association of Canada), Emma Scott Raff (dramatist), Jessie Alexander Roberts (dramatist), Ida McLean (singer), and Marjory MacMurchy – aka Lady Willison (journalist & author). Other early active members were: Lina Adamson, Maude Wilks, Katherine Hale (writer), Mrs. J.V. Fairburn, as well as visual artists Dorothy Stevens, Mabel Cawthra, Marion Long, Rody Kenny Courtice, Isabel McLaughlin and Kathleen Daly.

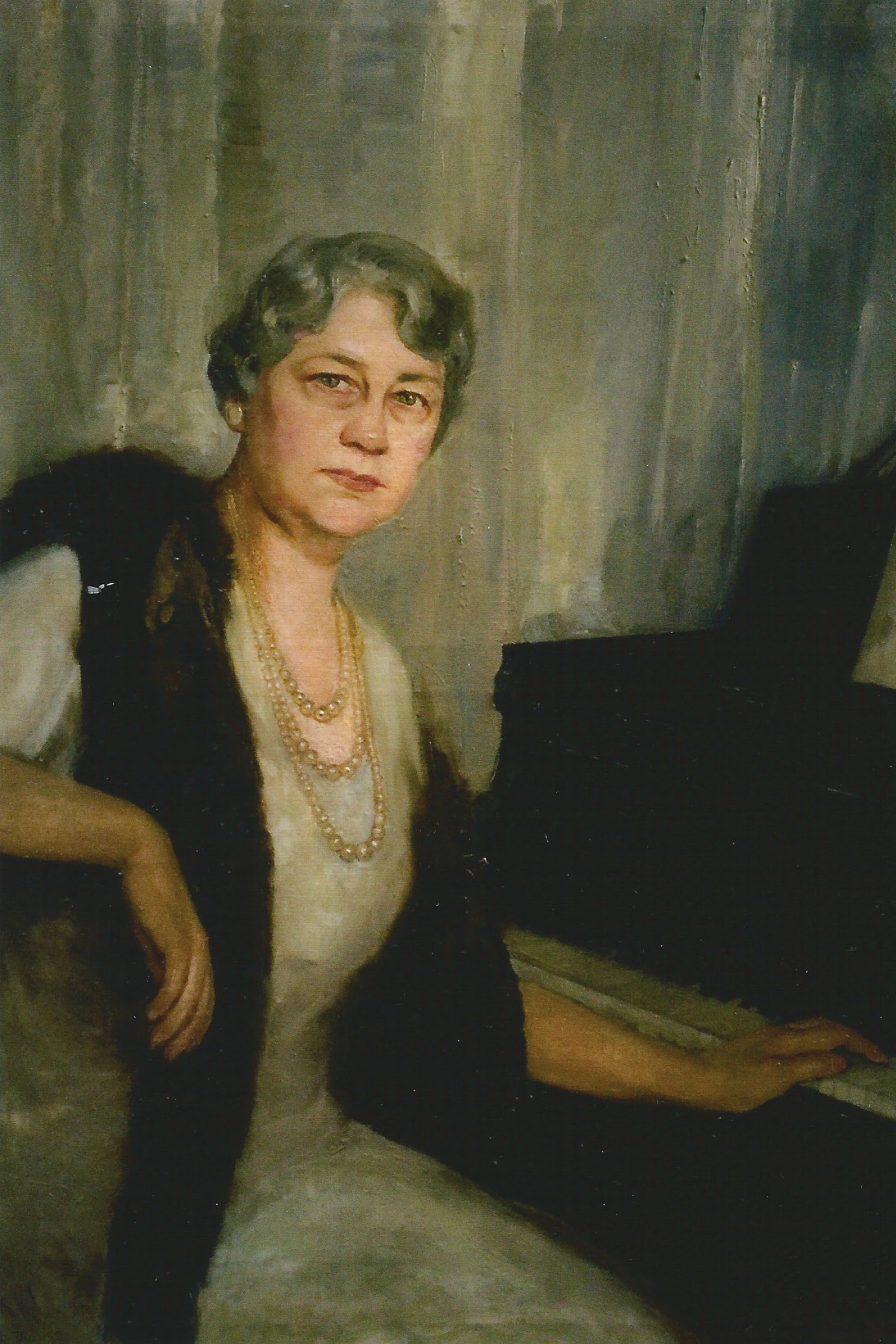
This 1934 painting of Club founder Mary Hewitt Smart (later Shenstone) by fellow member Dorothy Stevens is on display in Heliconian Hall.

Another impetus for creating the Heliconian Club was that women were excluded from the Arts and Letters Club of Toronto, which had been founded in 1908. Membership was by invitation only, and candidates were required to have distinguished themselves in their particular field.

The early Heliconians resembled nomads, giving performances, holding meetings and hosting receptions for visiting artists in several different locations before settling in a permanent home. In 1914, members met in a suite of rooms over a bank at the corner of Yonge and Grosevenor streets. Better accommodation was found at 617 Yonge Street; later the Club moved again to a large room over a closed movie house at 801 Yonge St. At the club's annual meeting of 1923, the acquisition of permanent headquarters was discussed and members were asked to keep an eye open for a suitable building. Shortly afterward, artist Emily Louise Elliot spotted a "For Sale" sign on an apparently empty church on Hazelton Ave. It was the former Olivet Baptist Church, then owned by the Painters' Union, whose asking price was $8,000. In July, 1923, the club acquired the building with a down payment of $2,000 and the prospect of a $5,000 bill for renovations and structural repairs. Diligent fundraising enabled the work to be done. The mortgage was discharged in 1931.

In its earliest iteration, the Club hosted receptions for artists visiting Toronto, as well as mounted theatricals, skits, concerts, art exhibits, arranged art lessons and held a variety of social events such as luncheons and dinners. One of its specialties was extravagant tableaux vivants involving the talents of all of the members, including musicians, artists, actors and writers.

== Heliconian Hall ==
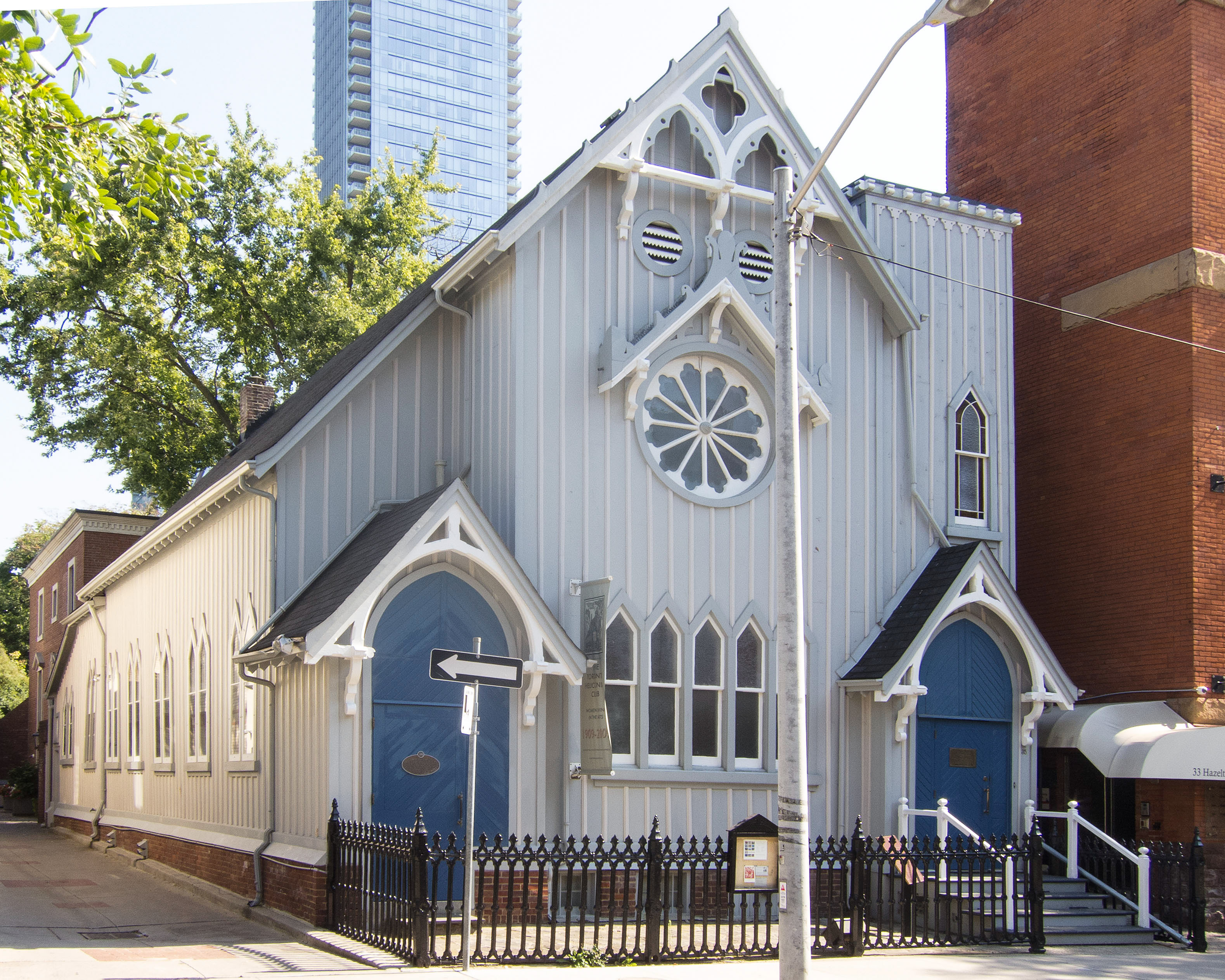
Heliconian Hall

The club's building, known as Heliconian Hall, is located at 35 Hazelton Avenue in the Yorkville area of Toronto. It is situated on the east side of Hazelton Avenue, north of Scollard Street. The area is home to many art galleries and boutiques, as well as picturesque Victorian and Edwardian houses.

The building was constructed in 1876, and its architecture is Carpenter Gothic. It has a board-and-batten exterior, and a unique carved rose window with drip moulding on the west façade. It is one of very few board-and-batten buildings still in use in Ontario. The building is protected under Part IV of the Ontario Heritage Act, designated by the City of Toronto since 1973.

In 1983, the Toronto Historical Board recognized it with an appropriate plaque as "the oldest building" in the Yorkville area. In 1990, the Heliconian Hall Foundation was founded as a vehicle to acquire funds for the preservation and restoration of what is often called the gem of Yorkville. Heliconian Hall was designated a National Historic Site of Canada in 2008, due to its distinctive architecture and its association with the Heliconian Club.

Other noteworthy architectural features include the square, flat-roofed tower, asymmetrically located on the building's southern elevation, two symmetrical steeply gabled entrance porches, and an arcade of narrow-pointed arched windows. The main hall has a vaulted ceiling, a low stage and a fireplace. Due to its excellent acoustics, the venue is in high demand for concerts and other performances. In addition, there is a small meeting room beside the hall, with a bar and a kitchen. The hall may be rented for events and performances.

== Current activities ==
While the Heliconian Club remains true to its objective as a forum for interaction among women in the arts, it has also evolved. Club events attract participants from across the city – the Monday Life Drawing Group, founded by artist and teacher Erma Lennox Sutcliffe in the early 1970s, is vigorous. The Literary Lecture Series, founded by Janet L'Heureux and Jocelyn Paul in the mid-1990s, is consistently sold out. Since it was initiated, more than 170 exceptional Canadian authors have been featured. An annual concert series of varied programmes featuring the Clubs' high-caliber performers is another well-ensconced tradition. Each month, member artists present art exhibitions in the hall for public viewing; exhibitions include drawings, paintings, mixed media, found objects, textile art, photography and occasionally sculpture.

== Notable members ==
The longevity of the Heliconian Club comes from its many members, whose reputation and accomplishments are not limited to Toronto but recognized across Canada. Many early Heliconians were trailblazers in their areas of expertise.

Seven Heliconians have received the country's highest honour, the Order of Canada:

1. Dora Mavor Moore (1888–1979), actor and director who was instrumental in establishing Canadian professional theatre and has an annual award named in her honour

2. Marjorie Wilkins Campbell (1901–1986), a writer who also twice won the Governor General's Award

3. Isabel McLaughlin (1903–2002), visual artist, patron and philanthropist

4. Edna Staebler (1906–2006), prolific writer at Maclean's and Chatelaine magazines

5. Francess Halpenny (1919–2017), editor at University of Toronto Press, Dean of U of T faculty of Library Science

6. Doreen Hall (1921-2025), violinist and music educator who brought Orff method of teaching to Canada

7. Lois Marshall (1924–1997), soprano

Other notable members are listed below:

- Mary Hiester Reid (1854–1921) - painter
- Jessie Alexander Roberts (1864–1955) – famous elocutionist and author of Platform Sketches
- Susie Frances Harrison (1859–1931 or 1935) – writer under the name “Seranus” and composer
- Jean Blewett (1862–1934) – poet and writer
- Virna Sheard (1862–1943) – poet and novelist
- Florence Helena McGillivray (1864–1938) – painter
- Elizabeth McGillivray Knowles (1866–1928) – romantic landscape painter
- Emily Louise Orr Elliott (1867–1952) – artist, graphic designer, fashion designer
- Mabel Cawthra (1871–1943) – painter and decorator active in the Arts and Crafts Movement
- Katherine Hale (1874–1956) – prolific poet and writer of travel books
- Lorrie Dunington-Grubb (1877–1945) – landscape architect
- Mary Wrinch (1877–1969) – painter
- Mazo de la Roche (1879–1961) – author of the famous Jalna novels
- Estelle Muriel Kerr (1879–1971) – painter, illustrator and writer
- Marion Long (1882–1970) – painter of military portraits, landscapes and still life
- Dorothy Stevens (1888–1966) – etcher and portrait painter
- Rody Kenny Courtice (1891–1973) – painter and teacher; member of the Canadian Group of Painters
- Grace Morris Craig (1891–1987) - painter and writer
- Yvonne McKague Housser (1897–1996) – painter often associated with the Group of Seven; member of Canadian Group of Painters
- Jacobine Jones (1897–1976) – sculptor
- Kathleen Daly (1898–1994) – landscape and portrait painter
- Mary Quayle Innis (1899-1972) - novelist, historian, Dean of Women University College, Toronto
- Jane Mallett (1899–1984) – actor
- Lorna McLean Sheard (1901–1983) – actor and theatrical director who created an Experimental Theatre Group at Hart House Theatre in the early 20th century
- Alexandra Luke (1901–1967) – painter; Member of Painters 11
- Mona Coxwell (1892-?) – writer, dramatist; published theatre periodical called “The Curtain Call” from 1929 to 1941; member of the Canadian Women's Press Club
- Isabel McLaughlin (1903 – 2002) – artist, patron and philanthropist; member of the Canadian Group of Painters
- Claire Wallace (c.1900–1968) – journalist at the Toronto Star and the Canadian Broadcasting Corporation radio broadcaster
- Ellen Elliot (1901–1973) – publisher and editor
- Marie McPhedran (1900–1974) – writer; Governor General's Award winner
- Byrne Hope Sanders (1902–1981) – journalist, editor of Chatelaine Magazine 1929 – 1952
- Lotta Dempsey (1905–1988) – journalist; wrote for the Globe and Mail and columnist at the Toronto Star for many years
- Ruby Mercer (1906–1999) – opera singer and founder of Opera Canada Magazine and writer
- Muriel Stafford (1906–2004) – organist and choir master
- Eleanor Beecroft (1906–2007) – actor
- Helen Sewell (1906–2001) – painter and teacher
- Margaret Aitken (1908–1980) – journalist at the Toronto Telegram and the Globe and Mail who later became a politician
- Isabel LeBourdais (1909–2003) – journalist and author
- Hilda Kay Grant (1910–1996) – writer and artist
- Kay Kritzwiser (1910–2009) art critic, feature writer at the Globe and Mail
- Bronisława Michałowska aka Bronka Michalowska (1915–2015) – ceramicist
- Pearl Palmason (1915 -2006) – violinist; first woman to play violin section of the Toronto Symphony Orchestra
- (Aileen) Tyrell Morrow (1915–2005) – artist
- Amelia Hall (1916–1984) – actor
- Faith Wood Breen (1917–2005) – painter
- Elizabeth Dingman (1918–2010) – journalist at several major newspapers including the Toronto Telegram
- Jean Townsend-Field (1921–2006) – painter
- Joanne Mazzoleni aka Edith Joanne Ivey (1924–2019) – opera singer and author; member of Heliconian Hall Foundation
- Suzanne Mess (1928–2019) – costume designer
- Margaret Keslering Weiers (1928 – 2018) – diplomat, author; worked at the Toronto Star from 1963 until 1991 as a reporter, feature writer and member of the editorial board
- Patricia Rideout (Rosenberg) (1931–2006) – soprano
- Mary Gardiner (1932 -2010) – composer, pianist, educator; founding member and former Chair of the Association of Canadian Women Composers
- Maryon Kantaroff (1933–2019) – sculptor

== Gallery ==
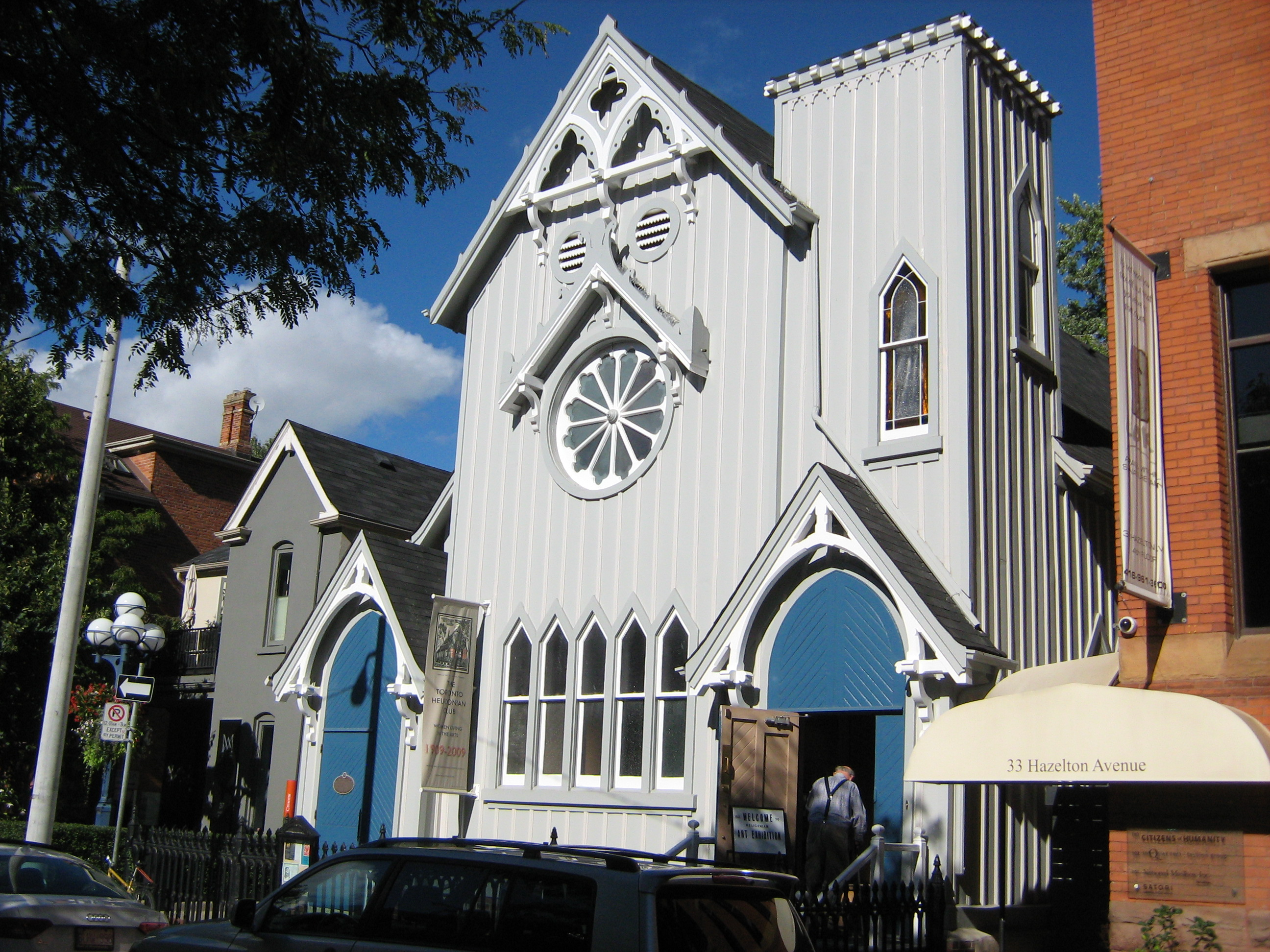
Heliconian Hall

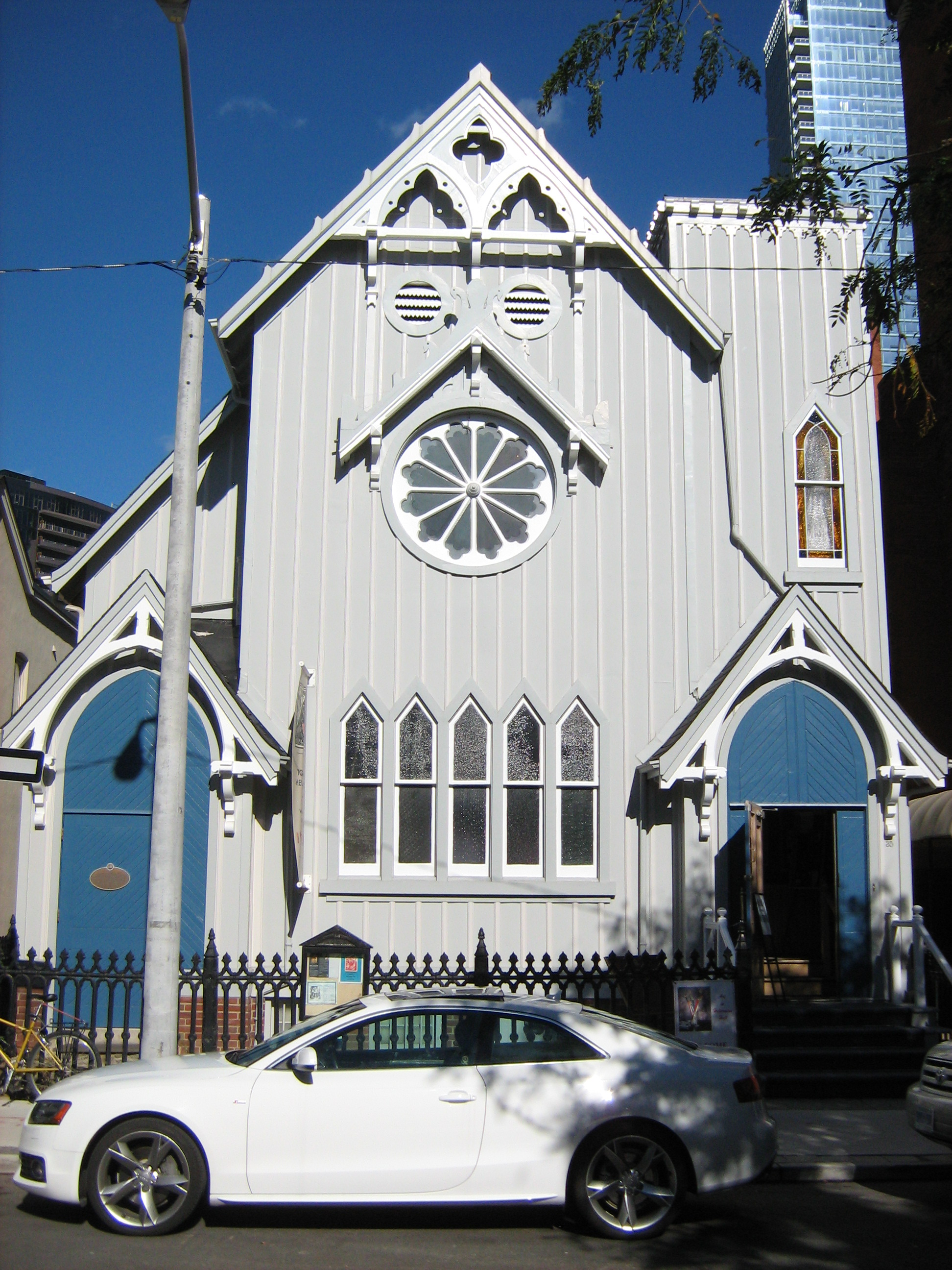
Front façade

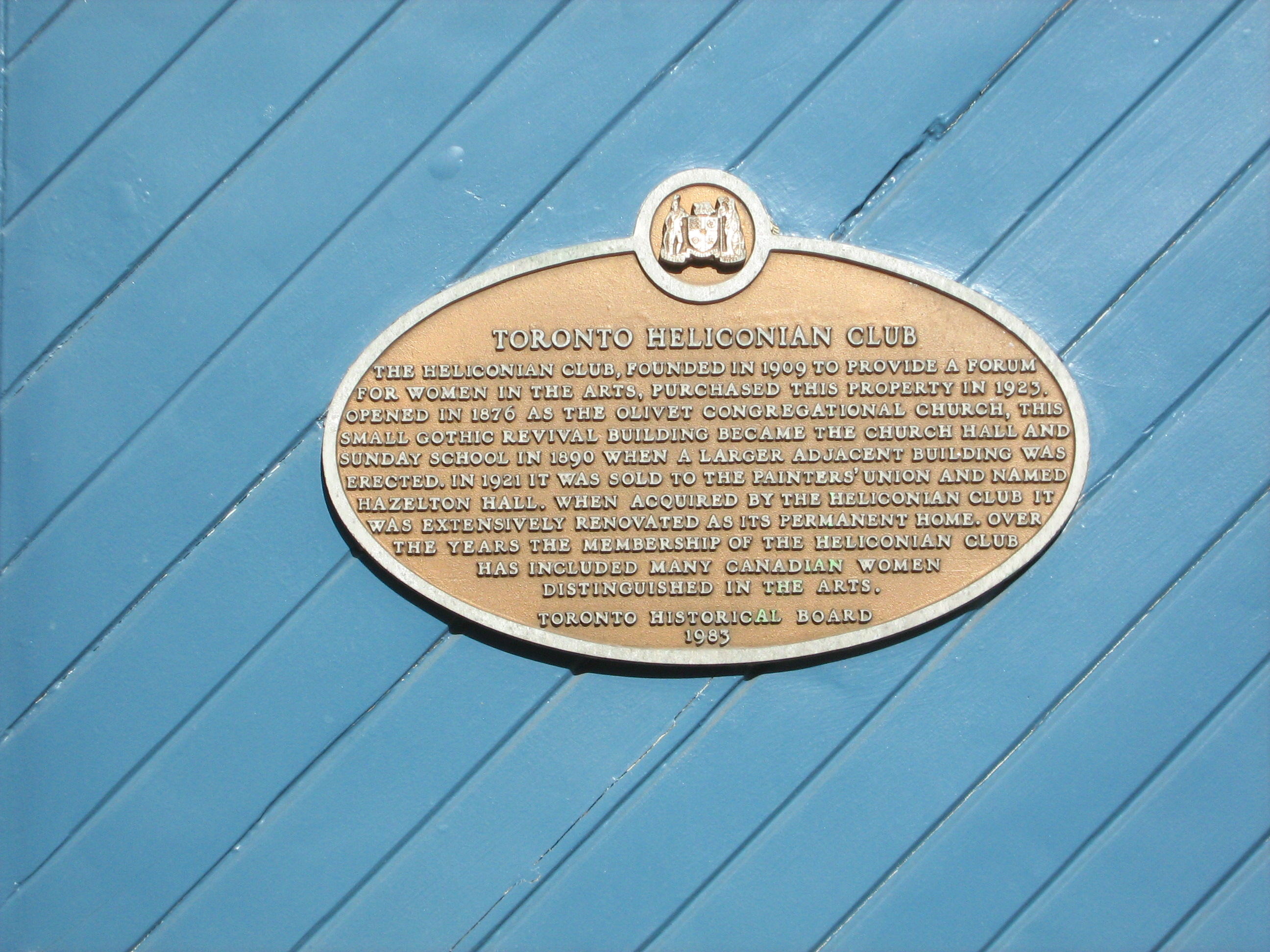
Toronto Historical Board plaque

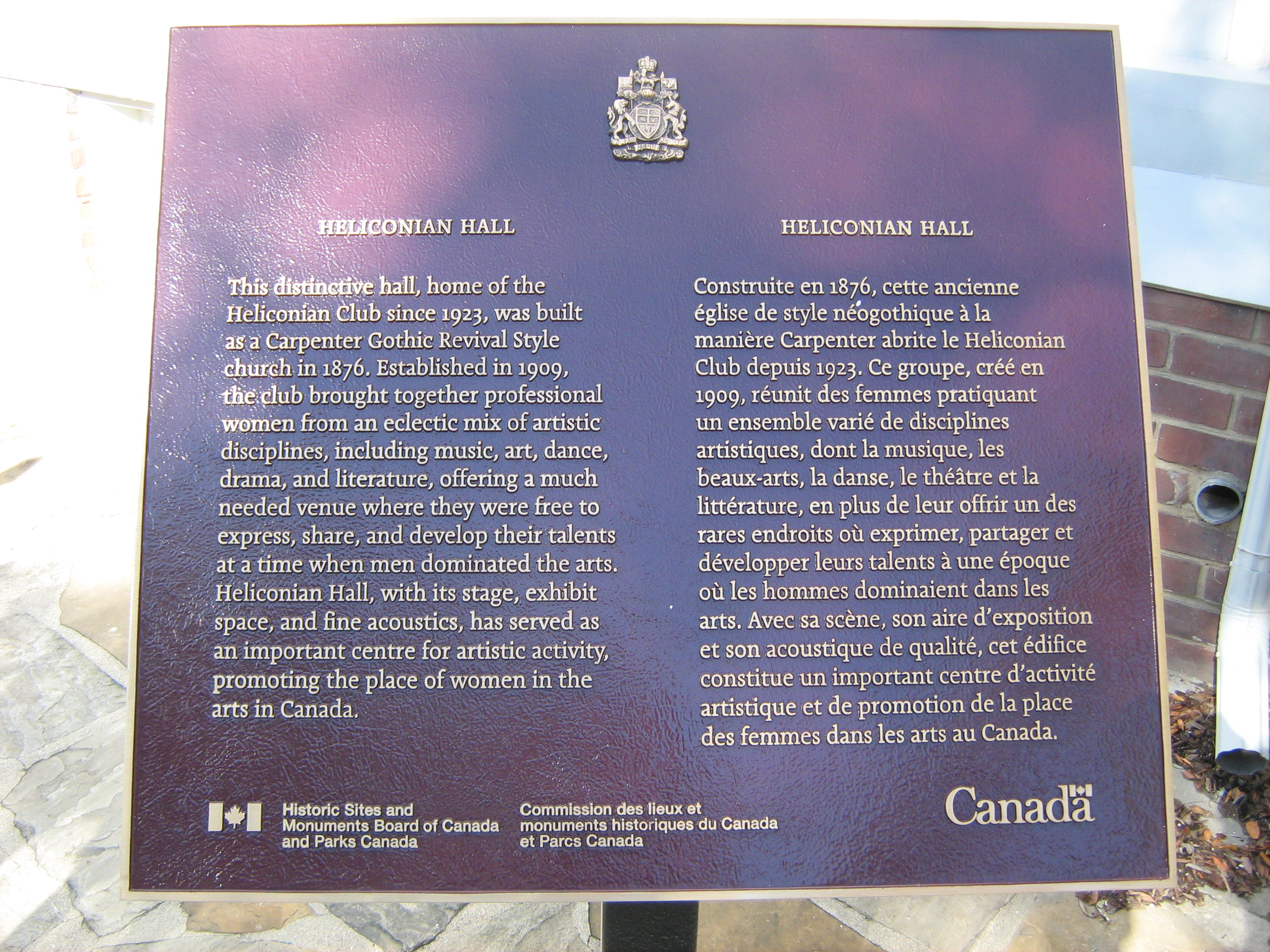
Parks Canada plaque
