= Dorothy Stevens =

Canadian etcher, portrait painter, print maker, illustrator and teacher

- Stevens in 1930 by M. O. Hammond
- Born: 2 September 1888; Toronto, Ontario, Canada
- Died: 5 June 1966 (aged 77); Toronto, Ontario, Canada
- Occupation(s): Portrait painter, printmaker
- Spouse: Reginald de Bruno Austin

Dorothy Stevens RCA (2 September 1888 – 5 June 1966) was a Canadian etcher, portrait painter, printmaker, illustrator and teacher, perhaps the most accomplished Canadian etcher of her day. She is known for the prints she made of factory workers during World War I. She exhibited in Canada, the United States, England and France.

== Early years ==
Dorothy Stevens was born in Toronto, Ontario, Canada, on 2 September 1888. In 1904 she left Canada to study at the Slade School of Fine Art in London under Henry Tonks, Philip Wilson Steer and Walter Westley Russell. She also studied in Paris at the Académie Colarossi and at the Académie de la Grande Chaumière under Lucien Simon. Stevens returned to Canada in 1911, and began a successful career as a painter and etcher. In 1912 she joined the Chicago Society of Etchers. Around 1913 she shared a studio in Toronto with Estelle Muriel Kerr.

== War artist ==
Stevens continued her career as an etcher during World War I (1914–1918), alternating between Toronto and New York. Her personality was unconventional and exuberant. She said that at one time in New York she went to so many parties that she saw no daylight for three weeks. Late in 1918 she heard of a program to commission works from Canadian artists depicting home-front subjects, led by Eric Brown, Director of the National Gallery of Canada, when her friends Frances Loring and Florence Wyle were given commissions. She sent a letter to Brown offering to make a series of etchings, and he agreed to accept two, one on shipbuilding and the other on women in a munitions or airplane factory. The etchings were to be sold to raise money for war relief.

Stevens insisted on doing four more plates. One was of the Toronto airplane factory, two were of the British Forgings munitions plant in Toronto and one was of construction of a freighter in Toronto Harbour. Brown seems to have resented her pushiness, and only allowed her to print twenty-five editions of her etchings, although Arthur Lismer had printed one hundred and Charles William Jefferys had printed fifty. Her prints were among the best produced under the program, vividly depicting the "hustle and forced pace" of the work. Her pictures showed both women and men working, including women making shells and men in a steel plant. Her picture of a heavy-shell factory shows both men and women working on the assembly line. Stevens made draft plates of Montreal factories, but the program ran out of funding before approval could be given for the work. The proofs have been lost.

== Later career ==
After World War I Stevens won a traveling scholarship to Europe to continue her art studies, where she sketched the cathedrals of Antwerp, Ghent, Bruges, and Brussels. She made several portraits of gypsies in the 1920s. She submitted La Gitana to the 1922 art show at the Canadian National Exhibition. Her exhibitions received excellent reviews, she won many awards and was given many commissions to paint portraits. She was known for her etchings, but was also a painter, portraitist, printmaker, illustrator and art teacher. In 1922 Stevens joined the Society of American Graphic Artists, then known as The Brooklyn Society of Etchers, and exhibited her etching Alhambra, Granada in the 7th Annual Exhibition in 1922 and her etching Segovia, Spain (for $18) in The Second International Exhibition of Etching (1923) sponsored by The Brooklyn Society of Etchers at the Anderson Galleries in New York City.

Stevens married in 1930 and became Mrs. Reginald de Bruno Austin. She became president of the Toronto-based Women's Art Association. Helen McLean recalls studying under her as a child at an art class arranged by the Women's Art Association in 1940. Stevens wore trousers and chain smoked. When the weather allowed she took her students over to the Toronto Islands to draw whatever they saw in the park. She told stories of the past, such as a costume party she had gone to with Frederick Varley of the Group of Seven. He was Anthony and she was Cleopatra, wearing a bodice made out of copper wire.

Stevens joined various other artists' associations in Canada including the Federation of Canadian Artists, the Ontario Society of Artists and the Society of Canadian Painter-Etchers and Engravers. During World War II (1939–1945) she arranged dances for soldiers at the Heliconian Club to raise money for the war effort. In 1949 she was elected a full member of the Royal Canadian Academy of Arts. Her paintings were shown in the United States and Canada, and in the London and Paris salons. She died in hospital in Toronto on 5 June 1966. The National Gallery of Canada, Art Gallery of Ontario and Art Gallery of Alberta hold her paintings.

== Illustrations ==
Publications illustrated by Stevens include:

- Hale, Katherine. (cover design) The White Comrade and Other Poems Toronto: McClelland, Goodchild and Stewart, 1916
- MacKay, Isabel Ecclestone. The Curtain Canadian Magazine 48.2 (Dec. 1916)
- Macbeth, Madge. The Mind of the Family Canadian Magazine Jan. 1917
- Bayne, Edith G. The Double Intriguer Canadian Magazine 50.2 (Dec. 1917):129-38
- Lugrin, Ann de Bertrand. The East in the West Canadian Magazine 52.2 (Dec. 1918)
- Bayne, Edith G. Honour To Whom Canadian Magazine 53.5 (Sept. 1919)
- Toronto Publicity Bureau. Toronto: The Canadian Metropolis and Convention City. Toronto: Toronto Publicity Bureau, 1922
- Grant, George Monro. Ocean To Ocean: Sandford Fleming's Expedition Through Canada in 1872 Toronto: Radisson Society of Canada, 1925 [revised edition]
- Hale, Katherine. Canadian Houses of Romance Toronto: Macmillan, 1926
- Hale, Katherine. Canadian Cities of Romance. Toronto McClelland and Stewart, 1933
- Hale, Katherine. Historic Houses of Canada Toronto: Ryerson Press, 1952
