= John William Garvin =

Canadian publisher and teacher in Toronto, Ontario

John William Garvin (1859–1935) was a Canadian publisher and teacher in Toronto, Ontario. He was also the husband of the writer known as Katherine Hale, the pen name of Amelia Beers Warnock.

Garvin was a prolific editor and published numerous literary anthologies.

== Selected works ==
- Garvin, J. W. (ed): The collected poems of Isabella Valancy Crawford, Toronto: W. Briggs, 1905. With an introduction by Ethelwyn Wetherald.
- Garvin, J. W. (ed): Canadian Poets, Toronto, Ontario, Canada: McClelland, Goodchild & Stewart, Publishers, 1916; with a second, updated edition 1926.
- Garvin, J.W. (ed): Canadian Verse for Boys and Girls, Thomas Nelson & Sons, Limited, Toronto
- Garvin, J. W. (ed): Wanderings of an Artist: Among the Indians of North America, The Radisson Society of Canada Ltd, Toronto, 1925. A republication of Paul Kane's original travel account from 1859 with an introduction by Lawrence J. Burpee.
- Garvin, J. W. (ed): Voyages from Montreal on the river St. Laurence through the continent of North America to the frozen and Pacific Oceans in the years 1789 and 1793 : with a preliminary account of the rise, progress, and present state of the fur trade of that country by Alexander MacKenzie, The Radisson Society of Canada Ltd, Toronto, 1927.
