= Edward S. Caswell =

Canadian librarian, publisher, and editor (1861–1938)

Edward Samuel Caswell was a Canadian librarian, publisher, and editor. He was born in Goderich, Ontario (at that time Canada West) in 1861. He was for many years the manager of the book publishing department of the Methodist Book and Publishing House in Toronto (which later evolved into the Ryerson Press), and in that capacity did much to advance literature in Canada. Among the writers he championed were William Wilfred Campbell, Isabella Valancy Crawford, Agnes Christina Laut, Charles Mair, Nellie McClung, Catharine Parr Traill, and Ethelwyn Wetherald. He began working at the Methodist Book and Publishing House in 1881 and was put in charge of book publishing in 1892; he continued in the latter role until his resignation in 1909. He worked subsequently at the Toronto Public Library and died in 1938.

== See also ==
- Canadian literature
