= Claire Wallace (broadcaster) =

Canadian journalist, broadcaster and author

- Born: 1900 or 1906; Orangeville, Ontario, Canada
- Died: 1968
- Occupations: Journalist and broadcaster

Claire Wallace (1900 or 1906–1968) was a pioneering Canadian journalist, broadcaster and author. Wallace was the first woman broadcaster to learn how to fly a plane, and one of Canada's first regular female radio stars. After first becoming a regular columnist for the Toronto Star in the 1930s, Wallace turned to radio broadcasting, hosting programs for CFRB and the Canadian Broadcasting Corporation (CBC). From 1942 until 1952, she hosted CBC's They Tell Me, which eventually peaked in popularity as the second highest-rated radio program in the country. She was known for her daring stories and reporting style, which included joining a deep-sea diving expedition, climbing a Mexican volcano, and broadcasting from 5,000 feet (1,500 m) above Niagara Falls.

After retiring from CBC during the 1950s, Wallace returned to CFRB as an adviser on etiquette and travel. She authored a number of books, including the 1953 etiquette guide Mind Your Manners, before establishing the Claire Wallace Travel Bureau in 1955: she took tourists to places such as Russia and China. As a well-loved Toronto celebrity, Wallace remained highly sought after for her charity work.

== Early life ==
Wallace was born in either 1900 or 1906 in Orangeville, Ontario. Her father was the owner of a local newspaper, having worked his way up from a position as apprentice. Wallace attended Branksome Hall School in Toronto. After graduation from Branksome, she took a variety of technical courses on topics such as cooking and motor mechanics.

== Career ==
=== Print journalism ===
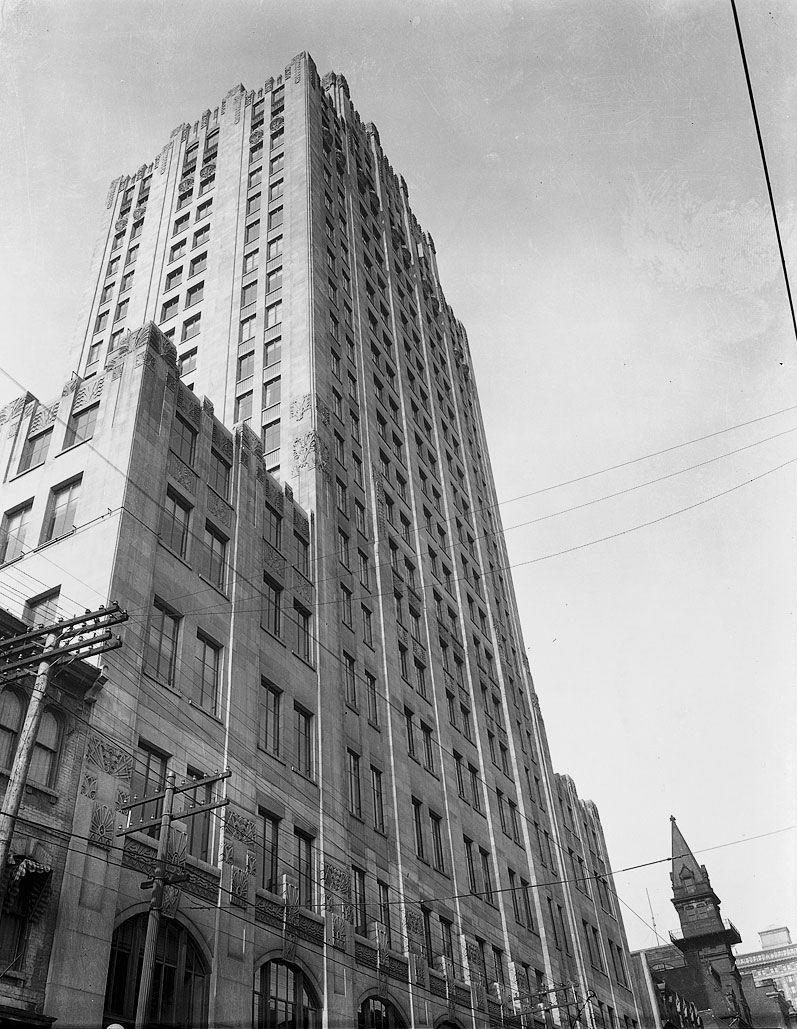
The Toronto Star building in the 1930s

In 1929, Wallace divorced her husband and turned to journalism as a source of income for herself and her son. For a while, she earned money by rewriting small pieces from urban newspapers and sending them to rural papers for $1 per story.

Looking for better pay, Wallace searched for bigger, more interesting stories to write. She took a job as a domestic maid to see what the conditions were like, and wrote about the experience. She tried to get a job as a taxicab driver, but was unable to persuade local authorities to give her a taxi license (it was an all-male field), and she had to settle for writing about the experience of being a chauffeur, instead. For one of her stories, she tested the honesty of local residents by dropping nine envelopes of money in different places around Toronto, then watching from afar to see whether people would try to return the envelope to its rightful owner or keep it (most of the envelopes were returned). Wallace's efforts gained her notice, and she was offered a job as full-time columnist for the Toronto Star.

=== Radio broadcasting ===
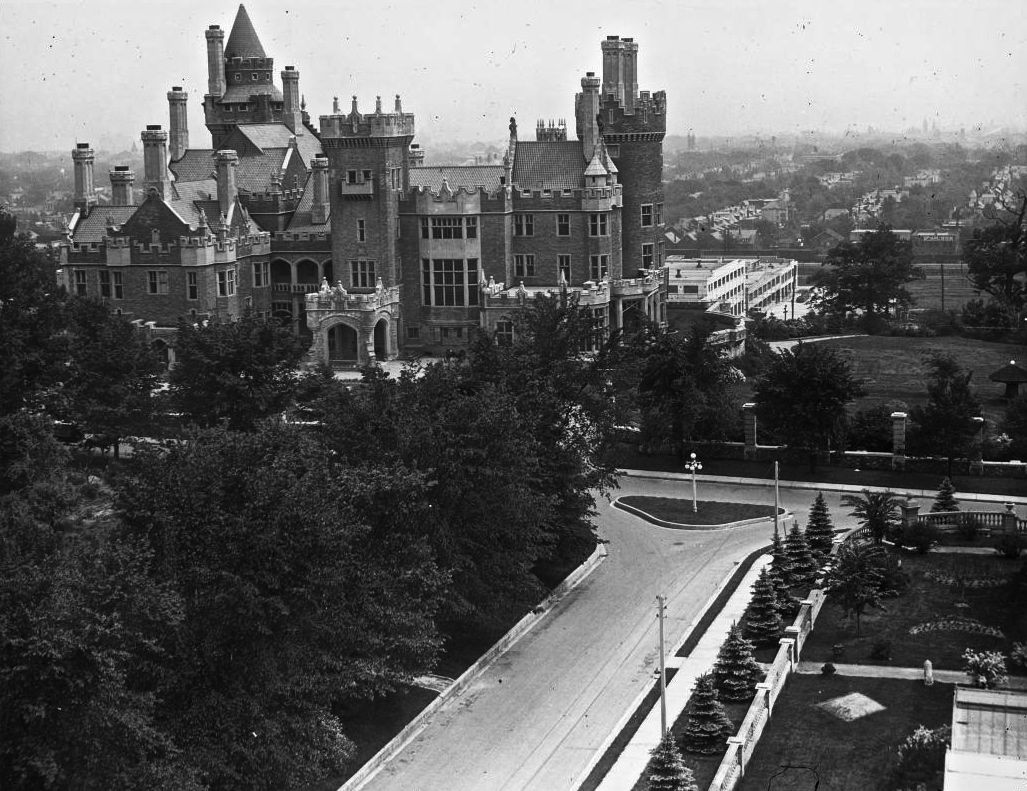
View of Casa Loma, circa 1920

Starting in 1935, Wallace delved into radio. Her Toronto Star column developed into a weekday evening radio program for CFRB, titled Teatime Topics. Travelling to England, Wallace crafted a firsthand account of London life during the coronation of King George VI for her Canadian listeners. After spending a night at Toronto's Casa Loma mansion, collecting material for a story about ghosts and supernatural phenomena, Wallace later broadcast an appeal to save the old building from demolition, directly impacting its preservation as a historic landmark.

In 1936, she joined CBC Radio. By 1942, Wallace was covering "off-beat" stories for CBC about life during the war. For the next ten years, she hosted CBC's They Tell Me, becoming one of Canada's first regular female radio stars and one of the best known voices on radio. Her celebrity guests included Dwight Eisenhower, and as a joke she once interviewed singing cowboy Gene Autry's horse. In 1946, Wallace received the Broadcaster Magazine's Beaver Award for her status as Canada's top woman commentator. At its peak, They Tell Me was the second-highest-rated radio program in Canada, bested only by The Happy Gang. A young Doris Anderson – who would eventually find fame as the editor of Chatelaine – got her start as a writer and researcher for Wallace's show in the 1940s.

Wallace became one of the highest paid women in broadcasting, earning $170 every week at a time when many newspaper employees were earning $40-$50 weekly. She was a member of the Women's Press Club and the Heliconian Club of Toronto for women artists and writers.

She was known for going to extraordinary lengths to find interesting stories for her listeners. During Wallace's career as journalist, she joined a deep-sea diving expedition in the West Indies and reported on her experiences. She interviewed British royalty visiting Canada and Canadian movie stars living in Hollywood, and she once interviewed an Inuit family from Wales, Alaska. Wallace hiked up the side of a volcano in Mexico, visited a gold mine and climbed down into it, and once broadcast from 5000 feet above Niagara Falls. She got an "undercover" job working as a store detective, and once posted an ad looking for a gigolo, just to see what would happen (she received 300 replies). In addition to all this, Wallace decided to take aviation lessons. She was the first female broadcaster to learn how to fly a plane, and the first woman to fly with TCA (later Air Canada) across Canada.

After 1952, Wallace returned to CFRB, advising on etiquette and travel.

=== Other work ===
Wallace published several books, including the 1953 etiquette guide Mind Your Manners. In 1955, she established the Claire Wallace Travel Bureau, and she took tourists to places such as Russia and China.

She was sought after for her charity work. Toronto Star writer Lotta Dempsey once said that Wallace "was the most glamorous, most loved celebrity of her day... if you could get Claire Wallace for a charity event or a fundraising occasion, you had it made."

== Death ==
Wallace died in 1968. Her papers and documents were donated to the University of Waterloo.
