= Elizabeth Cameron (editor) =

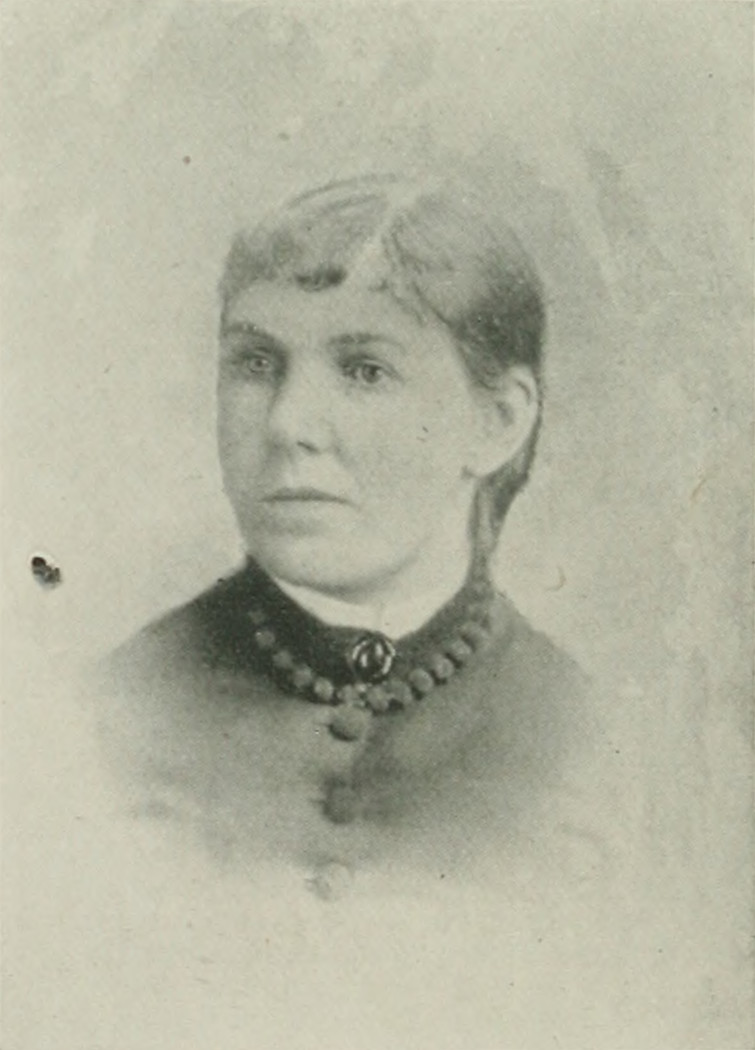
- Portrait photo from A Woman of the Century
- Born: Elizabeth Millar; 8 March 1851 Niagara, Ontario, Canada
- Died: 17 November 1929 (aged 78) Evanston, Illinois, U.S.
- Resting place: Graceland Cemetery
- Occupation: magazine editor
- Literary movement: temperance
- Notable works: Wives and Daughters
- Spouse: John Cameron (m. 1869)

Elizabeth Cameron (1851–1929) was a Canadian magazine editor, writer, and temperance advocate. Born in Niagara Falls, Ontario, she spent her early years in Montreal and Kingston before settling in London, Ontario, where she established reading clubs for women. Between 1890 and 1892, Cameron edited and conducted Wives and Daughters, a successful monthly paper published as a supplement to the London Advertiser. Her mission as editor was to encourage women to pursue systematic reading and intellectual enrichment, in addition to domestic responsibilities.

== Early life and education ==
Elizabeth Millar was born in Niagara, Ontario, Canada, 8 March 1851. Her early years were passed in Montreal and Kingston, and afterwards in London, Ontario.

Educated in private and public schools, Cameron was an insatiable reader.

== Career ==
She established several reading clubs for women.

She was strongly interested in temperance work. Cameron served as superintendent of the franchise department of the London Woman's Christian Temperance Union (WCTU), and was of the opinion that intemperance would never be overthrown permanently till women were allowed to vote.

Between 1890 and 1892, Cameron conducted a monthly paper, Wives and Daughters, a monthly supplement to the London Advertiser. Ethelwyn Wetherald served as assistant editor. It had a large circulation in the U.S. as well as in Canada. A call for articles -compositions for and about wives and daughters- was recorded in The Canadian Magazine of Science and the Industrial Arts, Patent Office Record. As editor of that journal, Cameron's mission was to stimulate women to become, not only housekeepers, but to be better furnished mentally by systematic good reading, more intelligent as mothers, well informed concerning the chief wants of the day, and thoroughly equipped intellectually and spiritually for all the duties of woman of that era.

== Personal life ==
On 30 September 1869, in London, Ontario, she married John Cameron, founder and conductor of the London Ontario Advertiser.

In 1927, Elizabeth Cameron relocated to Evanston, Illinois where she died 17 November 1929. Interment was at Graceland Cemetery.
