= Marion Long =

- Self portrait
- Born: 1882; Toronto, Ontario
- Died: 1970 (aged 87–88); Toronto, Ontario
- Education: Ontario College of Art and Design, Art Students League of New York
- Known for: figure and portrait painter in oil and pastel
- Movement: Realism and Impressionism

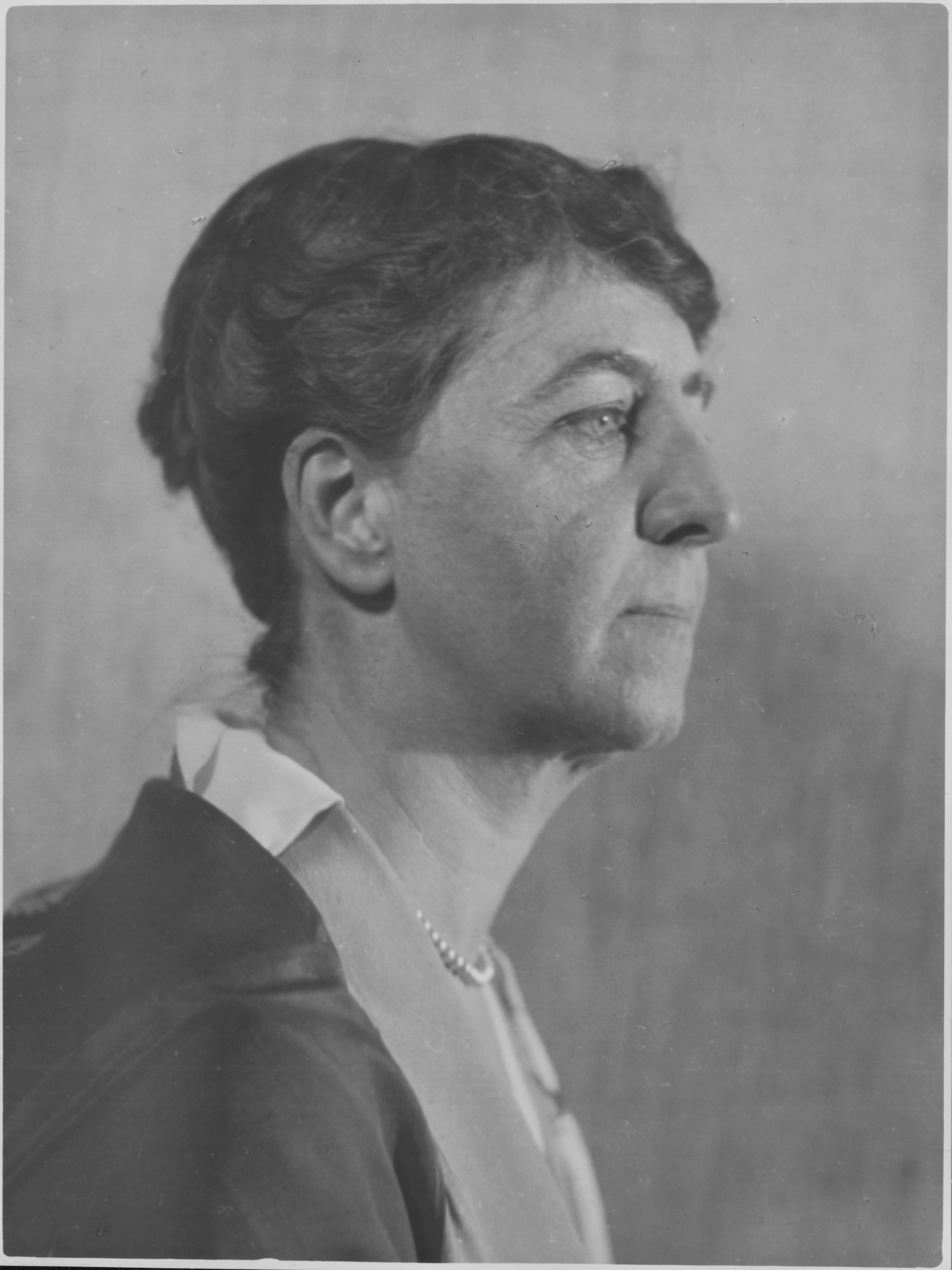
Marion Long, A.R.C.A., 192- or 193-

Marion Long RCA (1882 – 1970) was an artist, elected to the Royal Canadian Academy in 1922. She was often commissioned to paint portraits, sometimes of military figures. She is known for her urban scenes and portraits, landscapes and flower paintings.

== Biography ==
Long studied at OCAD University (then known as Ontario College of Art and Design), privately with Laura Muntz Lyall and Charles Hawthorne. In New York she studied at the Art Students League from 1907 to 1908 with Robert Henri, William Merritt Chase, and Kenneth Hayes Miller. Long opened her own studio in Toronto in 1913. She eventually occupied Studio One in the Studio Building when A. Y. Jackson went on active military service and Tom Thomson moved to the shack near the building. In 1915, Long contributed three drawings to The Canadian Magazine that provide a fresh interpretation of the First World War from a woman's point of view, including Home on Furlough (1915), Looking at the War Pictures (1915), and Killed in Action (1915). In 1933 she was elected as a full member of the Royal Canadian Academy of Arts.

== Memberships ==
- Royal Canadian Academy of Arts, Associate, 1922; Academician, 1933
- Ontario Society of Artists, 1916
- Ontario Institute of Painters
- Heliconian Club, President, 1919

== Awards ==
- received the King Haakon VII medal of liberation for services to Norway during World War II.

== Legacy ==
Long's work also was included in The Artist Herself, an exhibition co-curated by Alicia Boutilier and Tobi Bruce who also co-edited the book/catalogue.

== Record sale price ==
At the Heffel Auction, April 2021, Marion Long's Little Fruit Store, an 8 1/2 x 10 1/2 in. sketch, sold for $40,250.00 CAD.

== Bibliography ==
- Bradfield, Helen (1970). Art Gallery of Ontario: the Canadian Collection. Toronto: McGraw Hill. ISBN 0070925046. Archived from the original on 2020-06-07.
- Prakash, A. K. (2008). Independent Spirit: Early Canadian Women Artists. Toronto: Firefly.
