= Helen McLean =

Canadian author and painter (1927–2017)

- Born: 1927; Toronto, Ontario, Canada
- Died: February 7, 2017 (aged 89–90); Etobicoke, Ontario, Canada
- Occupations: Author, painter
- Known for: Details From a Larger Canvas

Helen McLean (1927 – February 7, 2017) was a Canadian author and painter, known for her autobiographical Details From a Larger Canvas.

== Biography ==
Helen McLean was born in Toronto, Ontario, in 1927. As a teenager, in 1940, she studied under Dorothy Stevens at an art class arranged by the Women's Art Association. She attended the University of Toronto, where she earned a B.A., and gained an M.A at the University of Calgary.

She married Ross McLean, and had three children.

McLean became an artist, writer, art critic, and teacher. She wrote two autobiographical books, Sketching from Memory: A Portrait of My Mother (1994) and Details from a Larger Canvas (2001). Her second book describes her struggles against the expectations she had set for herself, or that had been set for a woman by her family or society. Her 1998 novel Of all the Summers describes the experiences of a woman, Rachel, during different periods of her life. Rachel is now in mid-life and is rediscovering herself. The lyrical novel recalls her earlier relationships and work.

McLean's 2003 novel Significant Things was short-listed for the 2004 Commonwealth Writers Prize Best Book Award, Caribbean and Canada Region.

McLean died in Etobicoke, Ontario on February 7, 2017.

== Paintings ==
McLean's paintings have been exhibited widely in Canada. They are held in private and corporate collections that include the Bank of Canada in Ottawa. Her portrait of Margaret Laurence hangs in the Margaret Laurence Home in Neepawa, Manitoba.

== Publications ==
McLean published articles, essays and reviews in The Globe and Mail, the National Post, Brick, Quill & Quire, Books in Canada, the Literary Review of Canada, Room of One's Own and Ars Medica.

McLean's published books include:

- McLean, Helen (1994-01-01). Sketching from Memory: A Portrait of My Mother. Oberon Press. ISBN 978-0-88750-974-2.
- McLean, Helen (1998). Of All the Summers: A Novel. Women's Press. ISBN 978-0-88961-235-8.
- McLean, Helen (2001-04-01). Details from a Larger Canvas. Dundurn. p. 41. ISBN 978-1-4597-1457-1. (autobiography)
- McLean, Helen (2003-04-01). Significant Things: A Novel. Dundurn. ISBN 978-1-55488-607-4.
- McLean, Helen (2008). Just Looking: And Other Essays. Seraphim Editions. ISBN 978-0-9808879-2-1.
