= Estelle Muriel Kerr =

Canadian painter and illustrator

- Born: 1879; Toronto, Canada
- Died: 1971 (aged 91–92)
- Occupations: Painter and critic

Estelle Muriel Kerr (1879-1971) was a Canadian painter, illustrator and writer.

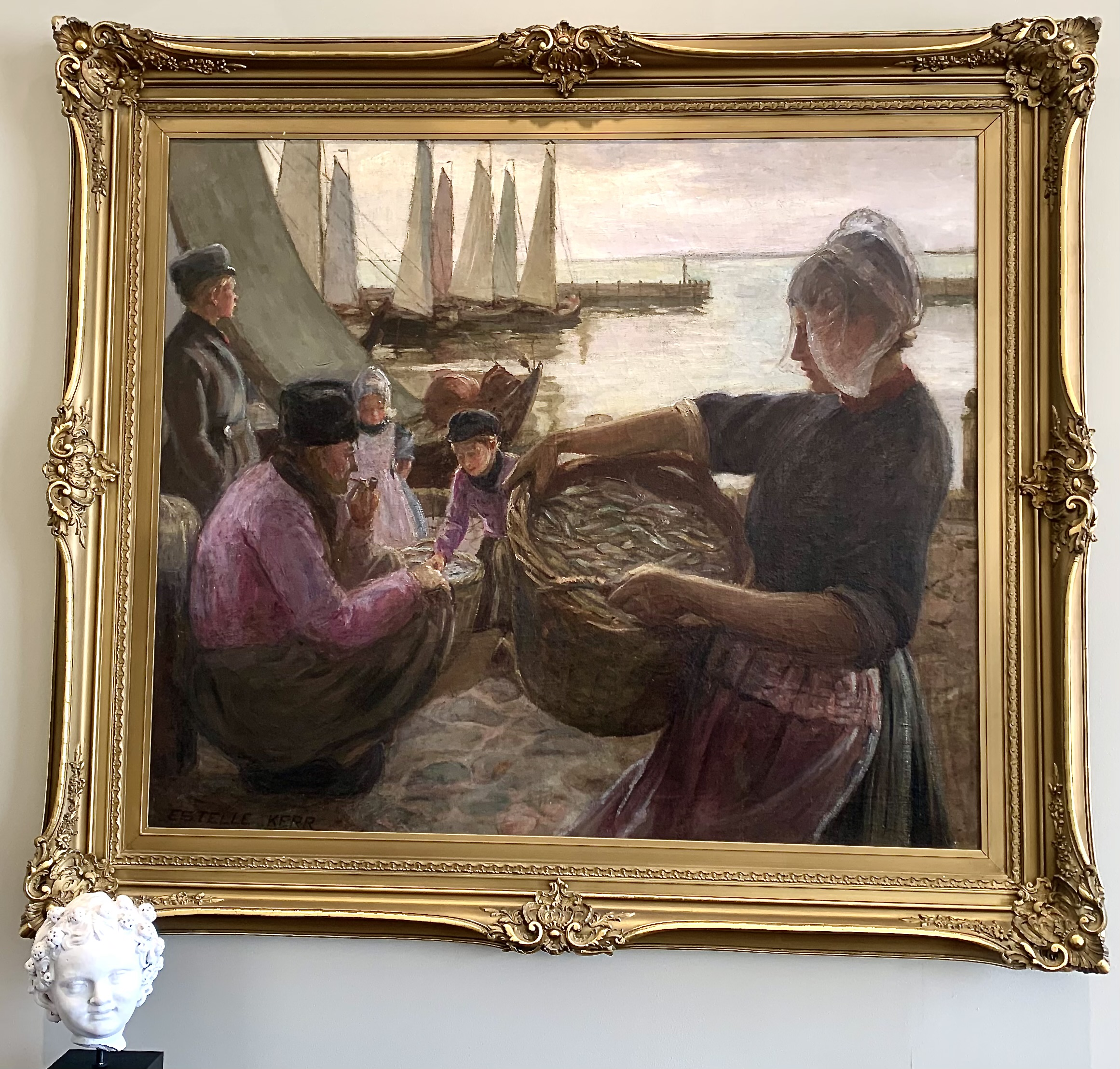

== Life ==
Estelle Muriel Kerr was born in Toronto, Canada, in 1879. In Toronto she studied with Mary Ella Dignam and Laura Muntz Lyall. She studied at The New York Art Students League (NYASL) for about two years from 1901. She also spent two years at the Académie de la Grande Chaumière. During the summers she sketched in Italy, Switzerland, France, Belgium and the Netherlands.

Around 1913 Kerr shared a studio in Toronto with Dorothy Stevens. In World War I (1914-1918) she drove an ambulance in France. She became well known as an art critic and a painter of children. She also painted landscapes and figure studies. Kerr was among the founding members of the Graphics Art Club and the Heliconian Club. She died in 1971.

== Publications ==
Kerr illustrated several children's books and contributed illustrated stories and poems to several publications. She published:

- Little Sam in Volendam, children's book
- The Town Crier of Gevrey, based on her experiences in World War I.

=== Selected writings ===
- Concerning Canadian Art. Courier (7 Oct. 1916?).
- Do You Speak Spanish? Toronto Star Weekly (21 Aug. 1926): 21.
- How Henri Won His Maple Leaf. Canadian Magazine 54.3 (Jan. 1920): 220-22.
- I Seek Lodgings in Paris. Toronto Star Weekly (14 May 1927).
- In the Vineyards of Burgundy. Canadian Magazine 52.2 (Dec. 1918): 631-35.
- Monsieur Le Fou: The Tale of a Misunderstanding - Reggie Is Locked Up But Makes His Escape. Toronto Saturday Night (16 Jul. 1927).
- Recommended Hotels. Toronto Star Weekly (11 Dec. 1926).
- The Artist. Toronto Saturday Night 26: 35 (7 Jun. 1913): 29.
- The Etcher's Point of View. Canadian Magazine 48 (Dec. 1916): 152-59.
- Uncle Norman's Portrait. Canadian Magazine 50.6 (Apr. 1918): 489-495.
- Women Sculptors in Toronto. Women's Saturday Night (20 Jun. 1914).
- Royal Castles in France. Canadian Magazine 64.4 (Feb. 1916): 282-94.
