= Katherine Hale =

Canadian poet

Amelia Beers Warnock Garvin
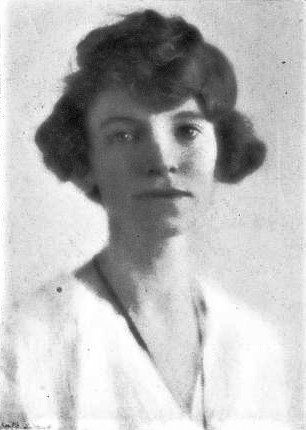
- Born: August 13, 1874
- Died: September 7, 1956 (aged 82)
- Occupations: Poet, Writer, Critic
- Spouse: John William Garvin
- Writing career
- Pen name: Katherine Hale
- Notable works: Grey Knitting and Other Poems

Amelia Beers Warnock Garvin (August 13, 1874 – September 7, 1956), who wrote under the pen name Katherine Hale, was a Canadian poet, critic, and short story writer.

== Biography ==
Amelia Beers Warnock was born in Waterloo, Ontario, in 1874. Her father, James Warnock, was a Scottish industrialist, and her mother, Katherine Hale Byard, was from Mobile, Alabama and a relation of Edward Everett Hale. She attended school in Galt, Ontario, including Galt Collegiate Institute, where she performed in operettas. She also studied at Glen Mawr day school in Toronto, before traveling to New York and Europe to train as an opera singer.

Following her studies, Hale toured as a soprano recitalist and gave lectures on a variety of topics, including Canadian literature. She had begun submitting pieces about Wagnerian opera to publications while still studying in New York. Her work was well received and resulted in a position as Editor of Contemporary Literature with the Toronto newspaper The Mail and Empire. As her profile rose she adopted the pen name Katherine Hale, in a nod to her mother. Already an active journalist, musician, lecturer, and critic, Hale gained popular notoriety for her war poetry during the First World War. Her first book of poetry, Grey Knitting and Other Poems, ran into four editions of a thousand each, before it had been on the market for six weeks.

In addition to writing, Hale was a member of various association and served as president of organizations such as the Heliconian Club, the Women's Press Club, and the Women's Canadian Club.

She was married publisher and teacher John William Garvin, of Toronto, in 1912. She died in 1956.

== Works ==
- Grey Knitting, And Other Poems, (1914)
- The White Comrade And Other Poems, (1916)
- The New Joan And Other Poems, (1917)
- Morning In The West, (1923)
- Isabella Valancy Crawford, (1923)
- Legends Of The St Lawrence, (1926)
- Canadian Houses Of Romance, (1926)
- Story Of Jeanne Mance, (1930)
- Story Of Pierre Esprit Raddison, (1931)
- Canadian Cities Of Romance, (1933)
- The Island, And Other Poems, (1934)
- Canada's Peace Tower And Memorial Chamber..., (1935)
- This Is Ontario!, (1937)
- The Flute And Other Poems, (1950)
- Historic Houses Of Canada, (1952)
