= Farquhar McGillivray Knowles =

Farquhar McGillivray Strachan Stewart Knowles
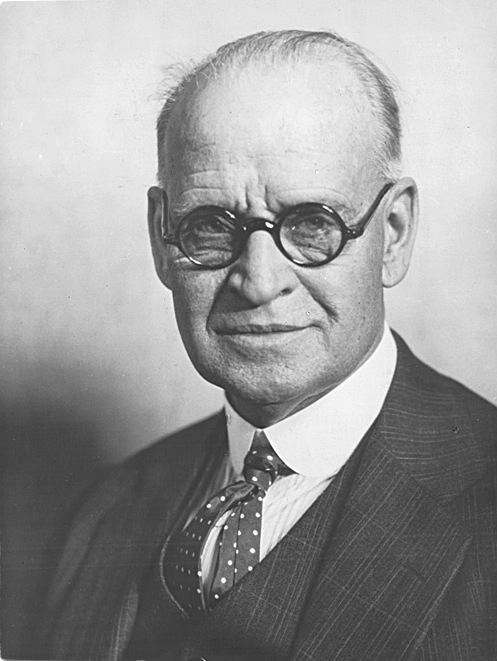
- Farquhar McGillivray Knowles in 1930
- Born: May 22, 1859; Elora, Canada West
- Died: April 9, 1932 (aged 72); Toronto, Ontario, Canada
- Occupation: Painter
- Known for: Seascapes
- Spouses: Ada Cullen (d. 1887), Elizabeth Annie Beach (1866-1928), Lila Taylor (m. 1931)

Farquhar McGillivray Knowles, also known as F. McGillvray Knowles, RCA (1859–1932) was a Canadian painter. He was best known for his seascapes.

== Early years ==
Farquhar McGillivray Knowles was born in Elora Village, Nichols Twp., Wellington Co., Canada West on May 22, 1859. His parents were Scottish in origin. In 1863 Knowles was educated in Guelph, Ontario. Due to the influence of his grandfather Thomas Knowles (Royal Hibernian Marine) Farquhar enrolled in the artillery at the military academy in West Point around 1877. He suffered a serious accident in his fourth year which ruled out a military career.

Knowles found work in New York City retouching photographs, and took some art courses there. He returned to Canada where he found employment with the William Notman and John Fraser photographic studios in Toronto. He added color to their portrait photographs of wealthy customers. The studio's co-owner was John Arthur Fraser, R.C.A., an accomplished watercolor artist, who instructed him in painting miniatures and watercolors. In 1885 McGillivray Knowles went to Europe, where he studied painting in England and France. Knowles married Ada Cullen, who died in 1887.

== Career ==
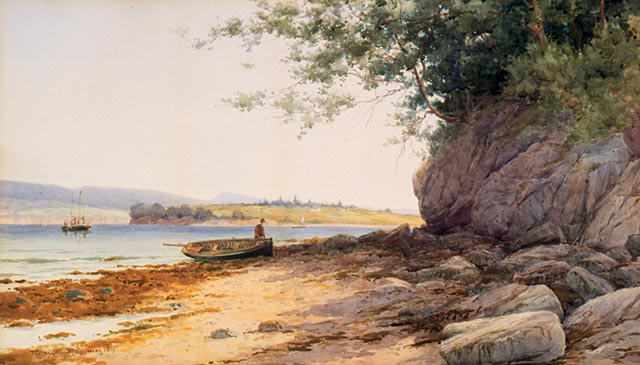
At Gaspé, 1891

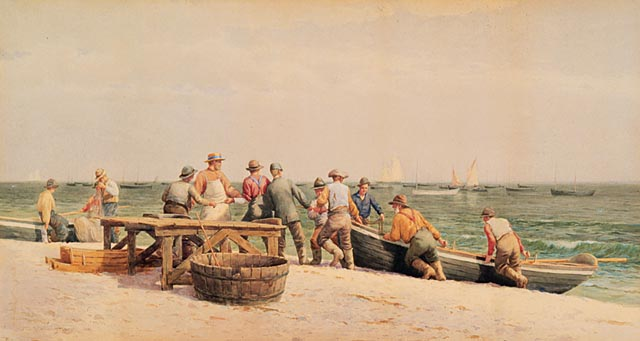
Are you ready, lads?, 1891

Knowles was elected an Associate of the Royal Canadian Academy of Arts in 1889 based on his reputation as a watercolor artist. He married his former student Elizabeth Annie Beach (1866–1928) in 1890. She was a niece of the well-known Canadian painter Frederic Marlett Bell-Smith. They went to Europe in 1891. Knowles studied in England for two years under Sir Hubert von Herkomer, R.A., and then in Paris for four years under Benjamin Constant, Jean-Paul Laurens, Henri Gervais and Veir Schmidt.

The couple returned to Canada and opened a school of painting, design, ceramics and life classes. A biographer wrote of Knowles at this time, "He was also keenly interested in literature, music, and in his moments of leisure indulged in a passion for carpentry, yachting, motoring, shooting and travel. Some years ago his beautiful studio in Toronto was filled with pictures, rugs, and quaint curios picked up in many parts of the world, and there he and his accomplished wife, herself also a musician and artist . . . kept open house, for they had a wide circle of friends and occupied a prominent place in the social life of the city".

Their studio in Toronto became a meeting place for artists. Knowles became renowned for his harbor scenes and seascapes, and also painted decorative murals in the houses of wealthy patrons. In 1911 Knowles installed eleven mural panels in the music room of the wealthy Eaton family of Toronto. They depicted historical musical scenes and included one of Arcadia with Pan playing his pipes, and his goats.

The couple spent 1916 living on their yacht in New York Harbor, where Knowles painted the harbor. At this time he was aged fifty-seven. They returned to Toronto, but in 1920 moved to New York. They took an apartment in Washington Heights, Manhattan. They often returned to Canada and participated in the main exhibitions, including the annual exhibitions of the Royal Canadian Academy.

Farquhar and Elizabeth Knowles had a studio at their summer residence in Riverton, New Hampshire. Elizabeth McGillivray Knowles died on October 4, 1928, in Lancaster, New Hampshire. In 1931 Farquhar Knowles married Lila Taylor, an artist and former student. Farquhar McGillivray Knowles died in Toronto on April 9, 1932.

== Work ==
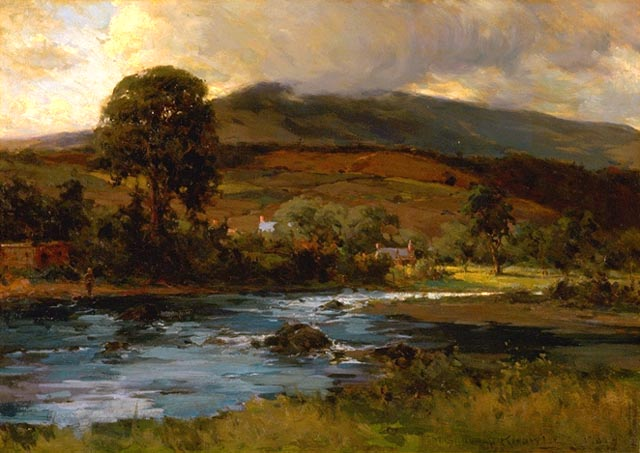
Beaupré, 1909

Knowles was best known for his marine studies. A reviewer in the Ottawa Citizen describing an exhibition in Ottawa wrote, "In the United States he has a strong following of those who admire his pictures of the sea. There are a number of these on view at the present exhibition and a few of them represent his highest achievement in this direction. They are all notable for their freedom of movement and authentic atmosphere. One of these is Windswept, a very successful rendering of air, sky and water as the tide begins to ebb on a bright boisterous day. Another is Shades of Evening, which depicts a seaway set against a range of steep and sombre hills. The whitecaps dance and the wind carries the waves before it. It is close of day, and the last rays of the sun strike the summit of the hills in the background while a ghostly schooner runs for home in the shaded lee of the cliffs."

The Mail & Empire said, "His Titan Bathers was for many years one of the most notable pictures in the Chicago Art Institute. Land and sea pictures from his brush are to be found in nearly all Toronto's seats of higher education and of his best known portraits might be mentioned those of Sir Robert Falconer, Hon. Chester Massey, Mrs. Timothy Eaton and Miss Addison. His series The History of Music is in the deaconess home in this city, and the Finding of Leander by Hero has been for years in the Ontario Art Museum."

The photographer Margaret Watkins visited Annie and Farquhar McGillivray Knowles in New York in 1923. She wrote they, "are both awfully orthodox in their work and made a great to-do about the modern movement in art ... My prints are a darned sight more up and coming than his silly little paintings of boats and pink apple trees. They are beginning to realize that their attitude is a bit behind the times and instead of catching up with the procession they wax sarcastic and grouch on the side."

== Gallery ==
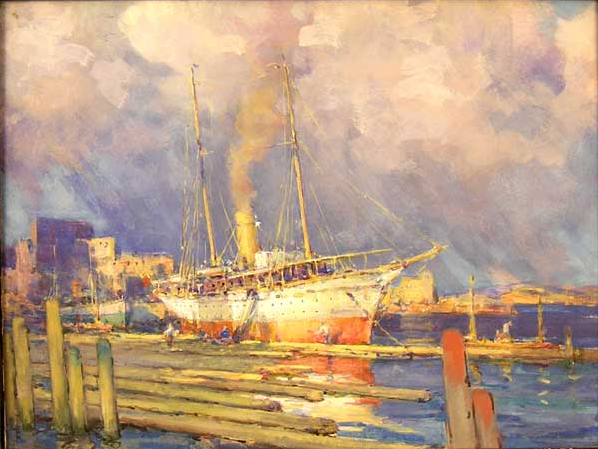
Getting Up Steam, c 1891

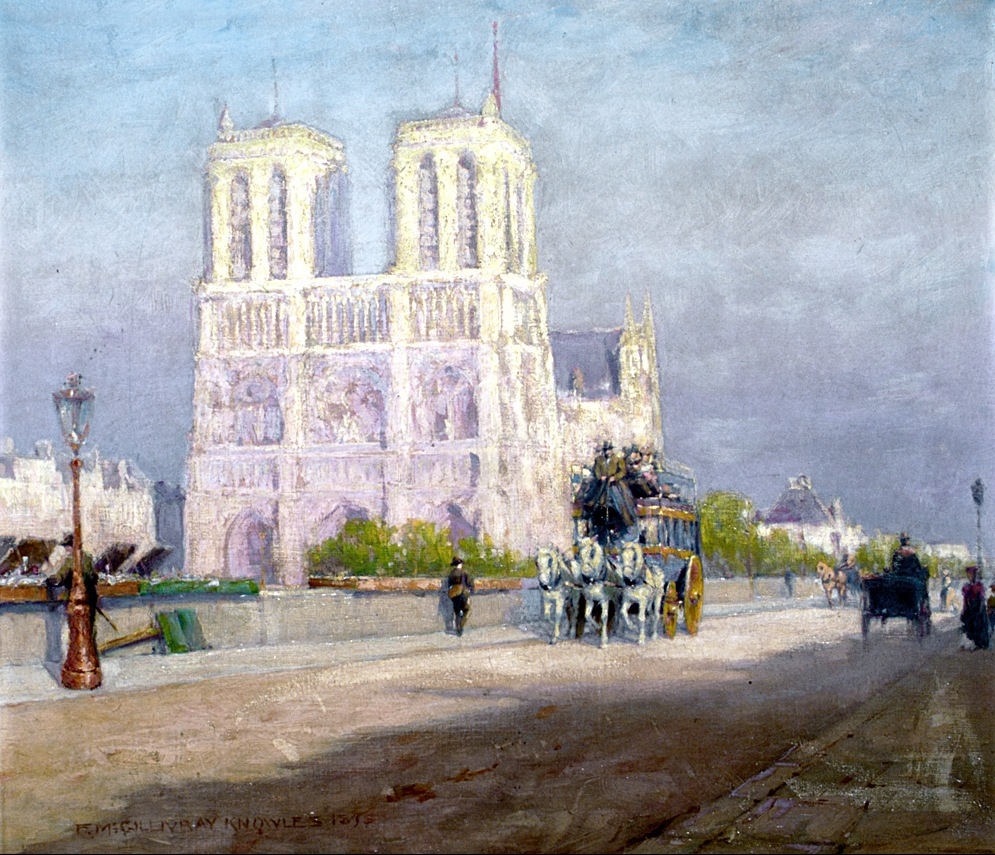
Notre Dame, Paris, 1895

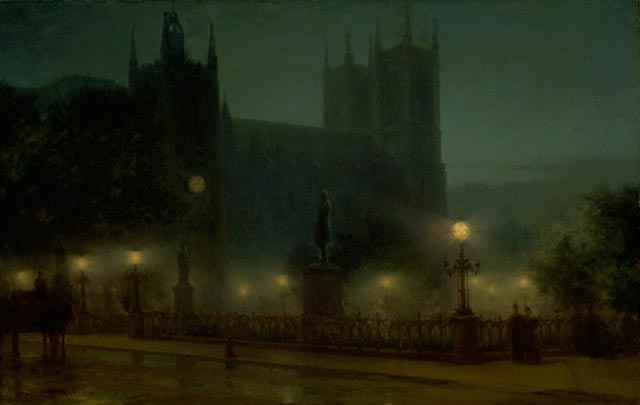
Westminster, 1895

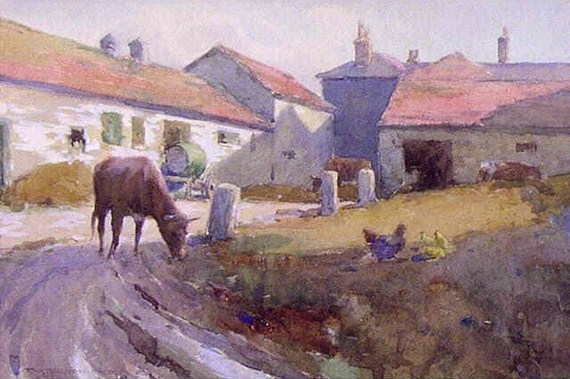
Farmyard, 1902

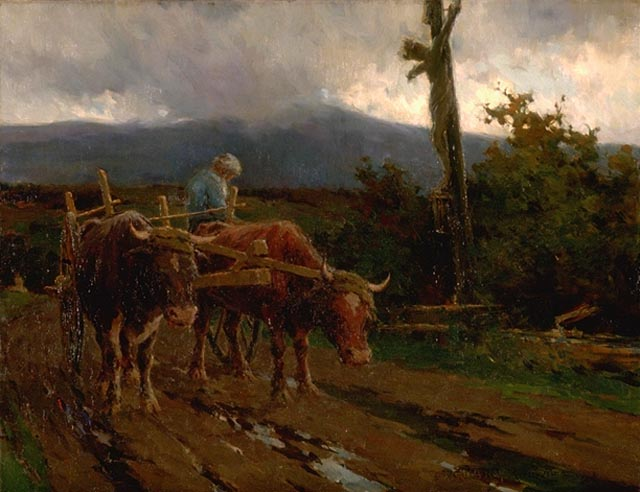
The Wayside Cross, 1905

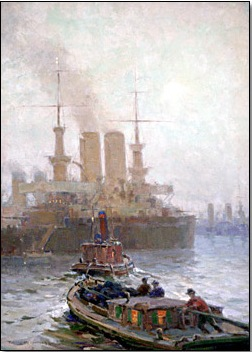
In Time of Peace, 1907

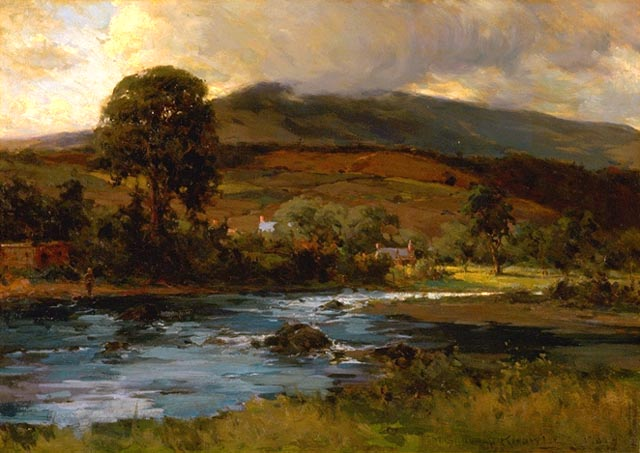
Beaupré, 1909

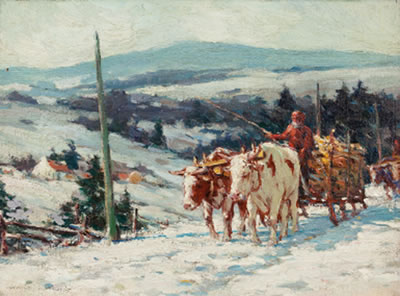
The Hay Cart, before 1933

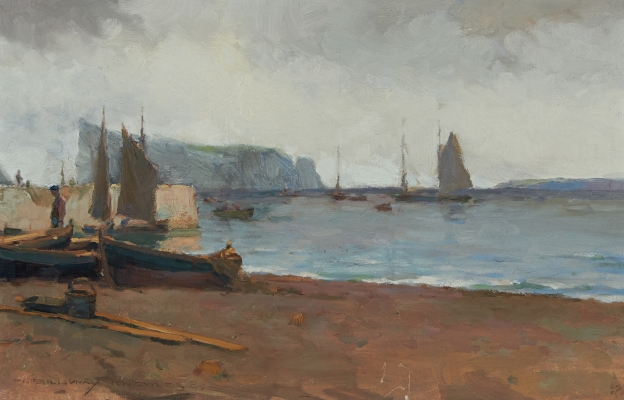
Percé, Quebec, undated

== Exhibitions and collections ==
A Memorial Exhibition of paintings, prints, drawings and lithographs of F. McGillivray Knowles was held at The Art Gallery of Toronto in October 1932. The paintings were assembled from a large number of private collections in Ontario. Other exhibitions of his work included:

- 1941: Mellors Galleries, Toronto
- 1944: Robert Simpson Co. Canadian House of Art, Toronto. The exhibition also included paintings by Elizabeth Knowles and Lila C. Knowles
- 1966: Jerrold Morris International Gallery, Toronto

At least three of his paintings are held by the National Gallery of Canada, a number are in the Art Gallery of Ontario and four are held by the Agnes Etherington Art Centre at Queen's University in Kingston, Ontario.

== Awards ==
In 1904, he received a bronze medal at the Canadian exhibition at the Louisiana Purchase Exposition in St. Louis, Missouri.

== Bibliography ==
- "Canadian Artist Called by Death". The Montreal Gazette. October 5, 1928.
- "Farquhar McGillivray Knowles". National Gallery of Canada.
- "Farquhar McGillivray Knowles (1859–1932)". The Canada Site.
- "Farquhar McGillivray Knowles and Elizabeth Annie (Beach) McGillivray Knowles". The Grinnell at 100.
- Huneault, Kristina; Anderson, Janice (April 11, 2012). Rethinking Professionalism: Women and Art in Canada, 1850–1970. McGill-Queen's Press – MQUP. ISBN 978-0-7735-3966-2.
- MacDonald, Colin S. (2006). "KNOWLES, Farquhar McGillivray Strachan Stewart". A Dictionary of Canadian Artists. National Gallery of Canada / Musée des beaux-arts du Canada. Archived from the original on August 8, 2014.
- McKay, Marylin J. (April 12, 2011). Picturing the Land: Narrating Territories in Canadian Landscape Art, 1500–1950. MQUP. ISBN 978-0-7735-9096-0.
- Prakash, A.K. (2015). Impressionism in Canada: A Journey of Rediscovery. Stuttgart: Arnoldsche Art Publishers. pp. 266–295. ISBN 978-3-89790-427-9.
