= Arts and letters =

Arts and letters is a historical and traditional term for arts and literature, implying a comprehensive appreciation or study of visual arts, performing arts, and literary arts or literature. The concept is similar to the liberal arts and has been used in similar ways.

== Arts and letters categories ==
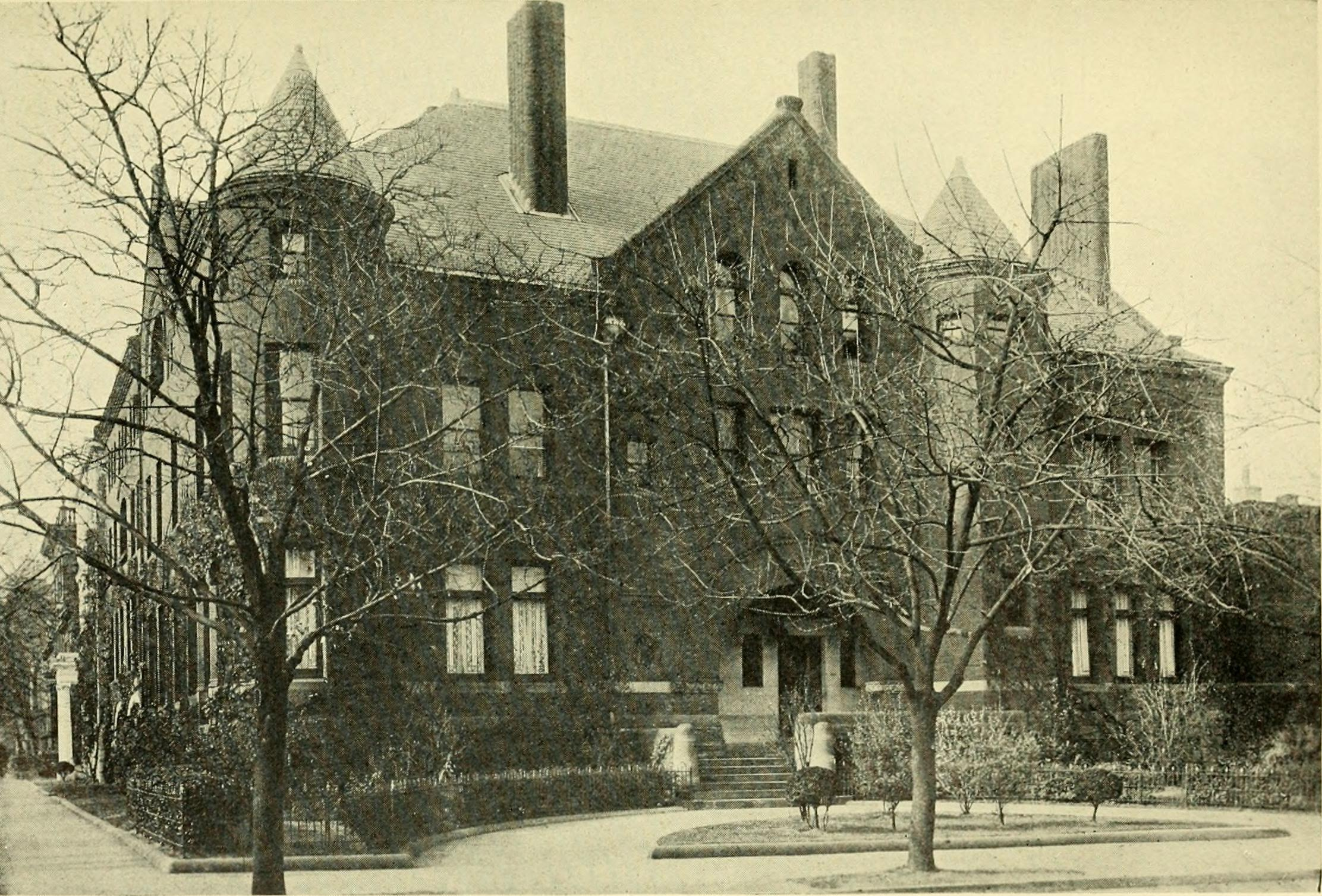
Institution of Arts and Letters, New York (1910)

=== As a discipline ===
The discipline of ‘Arts and Letters’ now involves the decomposition and understanding of the subcategories of humanities and the surrounding criticism of each medium. Its origin was in the study of Latin poetry but has since transformed to reflect an intellectualist critique of multimedia. Geoffery N. Berry is quoted interpreting the study as “criticism as an exploration” and states that the category “makes a commitment to the affairs of the world as well as books, history and science”. This is an example of the practical application of ‘Arts and Letters’ to the interpretation and documentation of wider society.

'Arts and Letters' is a critically and internationally recognised discipline. Studies produced under "Arts and Letters" are a contribution to the study of history, arts and sociology respective to the content or context of the medium. Studying pieces of 'Arts and Letters' supplies a sociological, intellectual and artistic insight to the era of its production. This insight is beneficial to understanding past societies and the functions that shaped its culture.

=== As an institution ===
The institution of ‘Arts and Letters’ is rooted in the 19th to 20th century American intellectualism scene where the first institute was The American Academy and Institute of Arts and Letters which was founded in 1865, Boston. The institution was founded “for the advancement of art and literature” on the idea of maintaining the culture and discipline of the category. The institution, however, has undergone many changes over the last century and is now a 300-member honorary society dedicated to literature, music and art.

'Arts and Letters' can be studied at collegiate institutions across North America. The study is made available in a bachelor's degree, honors, master's, and doctorate program each with the option of independent and specialized study.

=== As an education ===
The education of ‘Arts and Letters’ has taken on many forms. It is considered a sector of tertiary or higher education and is recognised as a bachelor’s degrees in some institutions. It is available in many institutions under humanities and offers the specialised study of the discipline. 'Arts and Letters' as an education has been studied for centuries prior to institutional education. In contemporary times, an ‘Arts and Letters’ major is a field of study that combines elements of literature with visual, liberal, and performing arts. The major’s highest frequency is in the North American University system. Ranked in the highest sector, The ‘College of Arts and Letters at Stevens institute of Technology’ engages in the specific research of humanities through ‘Arts and Letters’ and covers the historical and contemporary derivations of the category.

'Arts and Letters' can be studied as a bachelors, major, honours, masters or doctorate program and is often recognised under the institutions faculty or college of arts. The education of its categories is largely centralised and accessible through arts-related programs.

== History ==
The study of ‘Arts and Letters' has roots in Humanism where Latin poetry and drama were studied to trace the socio-political setting of different cultures and literary eras. Since then, much of the study had been isolated before globalization and the era of translation. By the late 19th century the term was used to name a few arts-related institutions in the United States. A subscription-based Theatre of Arts and Letters opened in New York in 1892, but closed within a year. The American Academy of Arts and Letters was founded in 1904.

Though 'Arts and Letters' is a study that has been conducted for centuries prior, the education and wide-spread institutionalization of ‘Arts and Letters’ possess origins in 19th and 20th-century North American culture. Established in 1842, the University of Notre Dame holds the largest and oldest college of ‘Arts and Letters' in North America with over 20 departments and research centres dedicated to the discipline. The term has also figured in higher education. For example, by 1889 students at Swarthmore College were sorted into two categories of study: "Arts and Letters" or "Science and Engineering." Since 2010, course requirements at the University of Pennsylvania College of Arts and Sciences have included a "sector" (category) called "Arts and Letters." The college defines the sector as including "visual arts, literature and music, together with the criticism surrounding them."

A resurgence occurred in the 19th-century American essayist movement which saw the centralization of the discipline in a formally recognized institution and society. The National Institution of Art and Letters (Swathmore College, USA) was founded in the late 19th century as a sub-branch of The Academy and Institute of Arts and Letters. The sub-branch centralized the previously fractured study of arts and letters into an acknowledged study of anthropology.

The Academy and Institute of Art and Letters is a historical institution and is now represented through The Art World Journal. The peer-reviewed journal details the annual meetings of the society that were held by “The Academy” in New York, Boston, Philadelphia, and select locations in France during 1916. The journal offers an insight into the place “Arts and Letters” had in intellectual society in the early 20th century as well as the global reach of its discoveries. Operating under and for the institution was their “Arts and Letters society” – an elitist group now deemed defunct.

Scholarly contributions to ‘Arts and Letters’ vary. The Propulsion Model of Creative Contributions Applied to Arts and Letters is a detailed tracing of the different scholarly and social voices that have held the discipline and study of ‘Arts and Letters' for the last century. Techniques and styles in the study of this category have evolved over the years and have since been applied to collegiate programs, scholarly thesis’ and academic journals. Contributions and collaborations to the category have become more attainable due to the dismantlement of “academic elitism”, translation, technology, and globalization.

== Different mediums ==
"Arts and Letters" can be considered an umbrella term for the study of various mediums of art. These mediums are the subject of the study and are used universally across discipline, institution and education. They include performing arts, visual arts, literary arts and liberal arts. Under these categories are different mediums that offer new sources and representations of information utilised by the study of 'Arts and Letters'. The evolution of mediums considered have expanded with the development of globalisation, technology and the digital age. Different mediums have become more prevalent in the last three decades due including digital art, music, photography, and multimedia. Though these mediums stray from the traditional literary medium they comprise the majority of the study in current times. As a result, contemporary mediums have expanded the study of 'Arts and Letters' and developed its use in society. Examples of each categories medium is seen below:

Mediums of Arts and Letters & Examples
| Category | Example |
|---|---|
| Performing Arts | Theatre; Screenwriting; Opera; Spoken word; Musical theatre; Dance; Specialised fine art; Performance art |
| Visual Arts | Drawing; Sketching; Painting; Digital art; Sculpting; Multimedia; Collage; Photography |
| Literary Arts | Fiction; Non-fiction; Manuscripts; Poetry; Contributions to collective works; Theses; Dissertations; Compilations of data or other literary works |
| Liberal Arts | Humanities: Literature (umbrella term); History; Philosophy; Arts: Theatre; Painting; Music; Social Science: Economics; Sociology; Psychology; Natural Science: Chemistry; Physic; Mathematics |

== Future ==
‘Arts and Letters’ has since been made more accessible and collaboration-based since the advent of digital technologies including online publication platforms, digital discourse and globalisation. Since translation has been made accessible, the study of international arts and letters has seen an expansion. The study now connects to global study and the interplay between different mediums.

Currently, contemporary forms of ‘Arts and Letters’ are found in publications and online platforms including “Literary Letters: Correspondence as Art Letters” which is serving as a platform for “true stories”, “literary discourse” and criticism of the present art scene. By extension, the online magazine has labelled itself as “the voice of genre” and has reformed the previously historical and intellectualist interpretation of ‘Arts and Letter’s’ to a more reachable audience. Another prevalent online platform currently publishing weekly discourse on contemporary and historical art is “New Books Network” – a digitalised interviewing and essay platform presenting on the criticism of ‘Arts and Letters’ and its subcategories. The “New Books Network” tracks digital humanities through “insightful interviews with scholars about their new art” which is a modern iteration of the academic category. This platform posts weekly and is free of use. Its publications include podcasts, interviews, essays, visual media and journal entries from a collection of scholars.

The digital and technical age has enabled the study of 'Arts and Letters' to be contributed to and collaborated upon. Global platforms have unified the study of multi-media and the collaboration of artists around the world. Social media, collaborative platforms and online forums have enabled public commentary on 'Arts and Letters' and contributes to its expansion. Derivations of the study have also been found in marketing, performance, classics work and politics.
