= Elizabeth McGillivray Knowles =

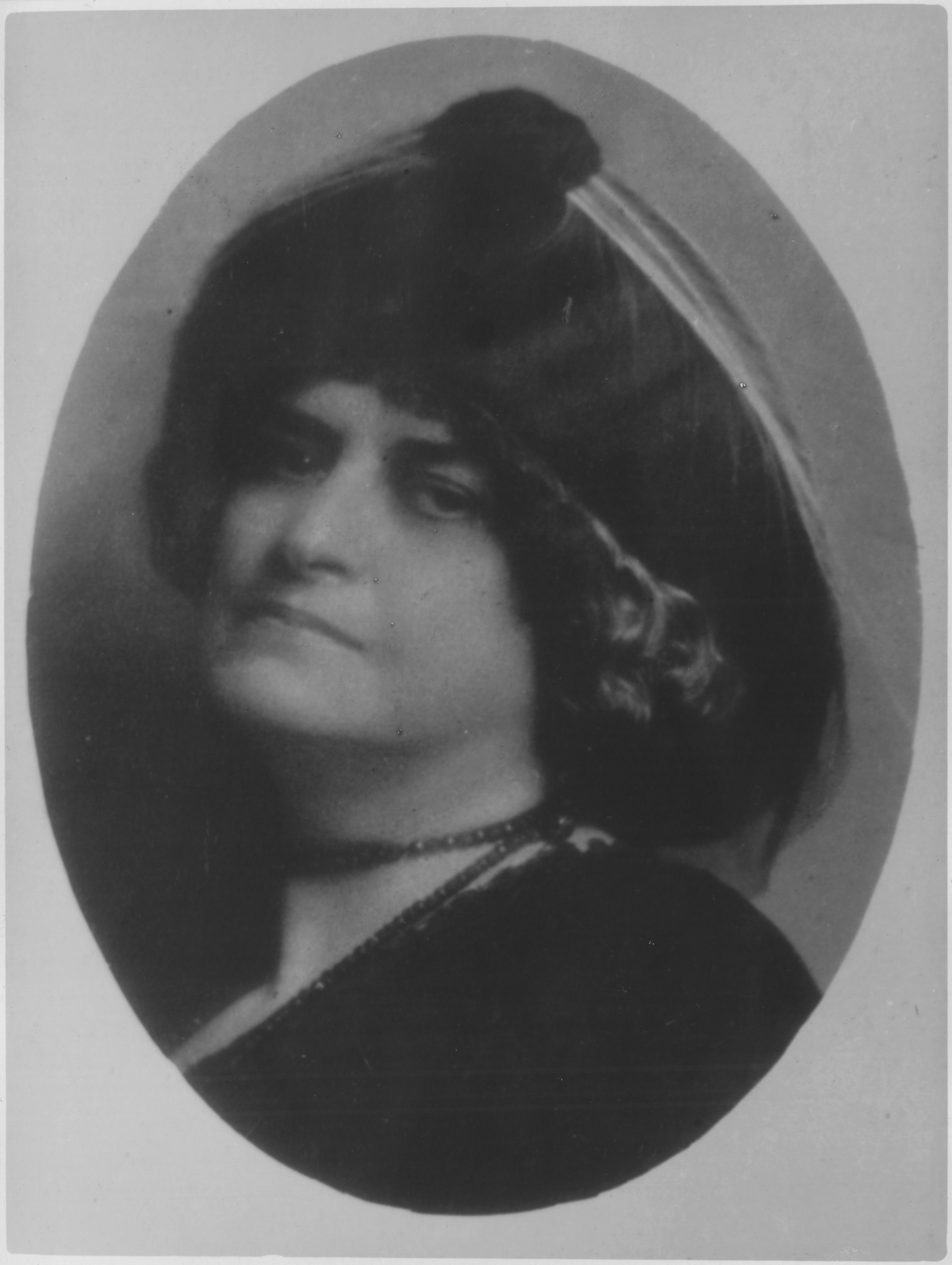
- Born: Elizabeth Annie Beach; January 8, 1866; Ottawa, Canada West
- Died: October 4, 1928 (aged 62); Lancaster, New Hampshire, US
- Known for: Painter
- Spouse: Farquhar McGillivray Knowles (m. 1895)

Elizabeth Annie McGillivray Knowles (January 8, 1866 – October 4, 1928) was a Canadian landscape painter, known for her paintings of domestic animals, especially fowl.

== Canada ==
Elizabeth Annie Beach was born in Ottawa on January 8, 1866. She was a niece of the well-known Canadian painter Frederic Marlett Bell-Smith. She was a student of Farquhar McGillivray Knowles, whom she married in 1895 after his first wife had died. Her husband had been born in Syracuse, New York, in 1859 of English parents who moved to Canada when he was an infant. After the marriage the couple made an extended study trip to Europe, then returned to Canada where they found a studio. Their studio in Toronto became a meeting place for artists. In 1908, Elizabeth Knowles was elected an Associate of the Royal Canadian Academy of Arts. She was a member of the Ontario Society of Artists. She also became an executive member of the Heliconian Club in Toronto.

== United States ==
Elizabeth and her husband moved to New York in 1915. They spent 1916 living on their yacht in New York Harbor, then moved to an apartment in Washington Heights, Manhattan. In 1919, Elizabeth was elected a member of the National Association of Women Painters and Sculptors based in New York. She and her husband continued to exhibit in Canada. She often exhibited at the Royal Canadian Academy of Arts shows, at the Spring Exhibitions of the Art Association of Montreal, and in galleries across the US. She often held exhibitions in the Johnson Art Galleries on St. Catherine Street W. in Montreal, sometimes with her husband.

Elizabeth Knowles became a member of the Pennsylvania Society of Miniature Painters, the Brooklyn Society of Miniature Painters, the Washington Watercolor Club, the American Watercolor Society and the League of American Pen Women. After 1927, Farquhar had a studio in Riverton, New Hampshire. Elizabeth Beach McGillivray Knowles died on October 4, 1928, in Lancaster, New Hampshire.

== Work ==
Elizabeth McGillivray Knowles received much acclaim during her lifetime for her miniatures and garden scenes. She favoured rural scenes, and was known for her studies of chickens. The National Gallery of Canada holds her Nocturne and the Art Gallery of Ontario, miniatures and an oil. The Agnes Etherington Gallery in Queen's University, Kingston, Ontario also holds her work.
