= Ethelwyn Wetherald =

Canadian poet and journalist (1857–1940)

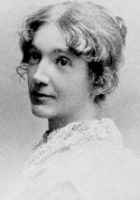
- "A Woman of the Century"
- Born: Agnes Ethelwyn Wetherald; 26 April 1857; Rockwood, Ontario, Canada
- Died: 9 March 1940 (aged 82); Pelham, Ontario, Canada
- Occupations: Poet, Journalist

Ethelwyn Wetherald (26 April 1857 – 9 March 1940) was a Canadian poet and journalist, published across Canada and the United States.

== Life and career ==
Wetherald was born of English Quaker parents at Rockwood, Ontario, on April 26, 1857. She was one of eleven children of Jemima Harris Balls and William Wetherald, the founder and principal of Rockwood Academy, and later a Quaker minister. Her family then moved to Pennsylvania where her father William became superintendent of Haverford College. Only two years later, the family moved back to Ontario. She was further educated at the Friends' Boarding School, Union Springs, N.Y., and at Pickering College. She never married, but did adopt a daughter, Dorothy Rungeling.

Wetherald had been known principally as a journalist and poet, but she also co-authored an historical romance novel An Algonquin Maiden: A Romance of the Early Days of Upper Canada with Graeme Mercer Adam in 1887. Her first independent publication, The House of the Trees and Other Poems, was published in 1895 and two more books of verse, Tangled in Stars and The Radiant Road, were published in 1902 and 1904. She wrote both prose and verse as a contributor to The Christian Union, The Chicago Current, The Week, Canadian Magazine, and Saturday Night. She also worked as an editor and contributor for The Globe using the pen name Bel Thistlethwaite, and was part of the editorial staff for The Advertiser including its monthly Wives and Daughters as assistant editor to Elizabeth Cameron in London, Ontario. She was an assistant to editor Francis Bellamy of the Ladies Home Journal and to Forrest Morgan, the editor of The World's Best Literature. In 1921, she published a book entitled Tree Top Morning, which she dedicated to her daughter Dorothy Rungeling who also became an author. In the last few years of her life, she contributed to the Welland-Port Colborne Evening Tribune children's column "Patty Perkins Club". She used her own name and occasionally used the pseudonym "Octo" for octogenarian.

== Publications ==
- Adam, G. Mercer; Wetherald, A. Ethelwyn (1887). An Algonquin Maiden: A Romance of the Early Days of Upper Canada. Montreal: John Lovell and Son.
- The House of the Trees and Other Poems. Boston, New York, Lamson, Wolffe, 1895.
- Tangled in Stars. Boston: Badger, 1902.
- The Radiant Road. Boston: Badger, 1904.
- The Last Robin: Lyrics and Sonnets. Toronto: Briggs, 1907.
- Tree-Top Mornings. Boston: Cornhill, 1921.
- Lyrics and Sonnets. Ed. John W. Garvin. Toronto: Nelson, 1931.
- "Going on an Excursion." Rose-Belford's Canadian Monthly and National Review 5 (1880): 236-38.
- "A Ghost Story." Rose Belford's Canadian Monthly and National Review 6 (1881): 499-503.
- "The Peculiar Trials of Old Daddy Herm" Globe [Toronto] Christmas Number 1885: 11.
- "Some Qualities of a Poet." The Week 3 (1885): 20-21.
- "One Vice of the Poets." The Week 3 (1886): 414.
- "Unliterary People." The Week 4 (1887): 250.
- "Critics and Criticism." The Week 4 (1887): 281.
- "Some Canadian Literary Women.-I. Seranus." The Week 5 (1888): 267-68.
- "Some Canadian Literary Women.-II. Fidelis." The Week 5 (1888): 300-301.
- "Some Canadian Literary Women.-III. Louisa Murray." The Week 5 (1888): 335-36.
- "Some Canadian Literary Women.-IV. Annie Rothwell." The Week 5 (1888): 494-95.
- "Snowflakes and Sunbeams." Rev. of Snowflakes and Sunbeams, by W.W. Campbell. The Week 5 (1888): 845.
- "A Bit of Country Life." The Week of 6 (1889): 138-39.
- "Lake Lyrics." Rev. of Lake Lyrics, by W.W. Campbell. The Week 6 (1889): 615.
- "A New Year's Story." Saturday Night 4 Jan. 1890: 7.
- "Going South. Bel Thistlethwaite has a Holiday. The Business of Starting." Globe [Toronto] 9 Jan. 1890: 2.
- "In the Mint. Bel Thistlethwaite at Home of the Dollar. How Coins are Made." Globe [Toronto] 18 Jan. 1890: 2.
- "The Quaker City. An Abode of Neatness and Regularity. Large Buildings. Large Ideas." Globe [Toronto] 1 Feb. 1890: 3.
- "Going South. Something More about the Quaker City. Tomb of the Franklins." Globe [Toronto] 8 Feb. 1890: 7.
- "Going South. The Journey from Washington to Atlanta. Into the Land of Cotton." Globe [Toronto] 22 Feb. 1890: 5.
- "Going South. A Pleasant Visit to Atlanta in January. Summer Instead of Winter." Globe [Toronto] 1 Mar. 1890: 11.
- "Going South. Marching through Georgia by Railway. A Marketless City." Globe [Toronto] 15 mar. 1890:4.
- "Going South. A Visit to the Old City of Savannah. Its Claims to Antiquity." Globe [Toronto] 29 Mar. 1890: 10.
- "Land of Cotton. Bel Thistlethwaite's Trip thro' Georgia. Chat with a Planter." Globe [Toronto] 12 Apr. 1890: 6.
- "Queen Dido's Dead. An Incident of Life in Florida. Bel Breaks the Pledge." Globe [Toronto] 19 Apr. 1890: 4.
- "Blind Man's Buff. Bel Thistlethwaite in Jacksonville. The 'Homelike' Hotel." Globe [Toronto] 26 Apr 1890: 4.
- "Value of Smiles. Bel Thistlethwaite Moralises on the Subject. A Stewardess's Compliments." Globe [Toronto] 17 May 1890: 4.
- "Letter from BUB. Bel Thistlethwaite Corresponds with Her Brother. Gives Her the News." Globe [Toronto] 7 June 1890: 11.
- "Orange Groves. Bel Thistlethwaite Still in Florida. A Chat about Oranges." Globe [Toronto] 14 June 1890: 5
- "Pathetic Bit of Real Life. Bel Thistlethwaite at St. Augustine and Savannah. The Quaint Old Spanish Town." Globe [Toronto] 5 July 1890: 7.
- "A Necessity of Life." Wives and Daughters Nov. 1891: 14.
- "Browsing in a Library." [B.T.] Wives and Daughters Nov. 1891: 3.
- "Browsing in a Library." [B.T.] Wives and Daughters Dec. 1891: 3.
- "Browsing in a Library." [B.T.] Wives and Daughters Jan. 1892: 3.
- "Browsing in a Library." [B.T.] Wives and Daughters Mar. 1892: 3.
- "Browsing in a Library." [B.T.] Wives and Daughters Apr. 1892: 3.
- "Browsing in a Library." [B.T.] Wives and Daughters May 1892: 3.
- "Browsing in a Library." [B.T.] Wives and Daughters Jun. 1892: 3.
- "Browsing in a Library." [B.T.] Wives and Daughters July 1892: 3.
- "Browsing in a Library." [B.T.] Wives and Daughters Aug. 1892: 3.
- "Browsing in a Library." [B.T.] Wives and Daughters Sept. 1892: 3.
- "My Little Sister." The Youth's Companion 8 Sept. 1892. 442-43.
- "Browsing in a Library." [B.T.] Wives and Daughters Oct. 1892: 3.
- "Browsing in a Library." [B.T.] Wives and Daughters Nov. 1892: 8-9.
- "Our Platform." [with Elizabeth Cameron] Wives and Daughters Nov. 1892: 5-6.
- "Browsing in a Library." [B.T.] Wives and Daughters Dec. 1892: 28-29.
- "Dress Reform: Rational Dress." Wives and Daughters Dec. 1892: 30-31.
- "William Wilfred Campbell." The Week 9 (1892): 166-167.
- "Browsing in a Library." [B.T.] Wives and Daughters Jan. 1893: 48-49.
- "The Corset Question." Wives and Daughters Jan 1893: 47.
- "On Enemies." Wives and Daughters Jan. 1893: 51.
- "Browsing in a Library." [B.T.] Wives and Daughters Feb. 1893: 68-69.
- "On Prayer." Wives and Daughters Feb. 1893: 67.
- "Some Favorite Quotations." Wives and Daughters Feb. 1893: 65-67.
- "Browsing in a Library." [B.T.] Wives and Daughters Mar. 1893: 88-89.
- "Browsing in a Library." [B.T.] Wives and Daughters Apr. 1893: 108-09.
- "On Sympathy." Wives and Daughters Apr. 1893: 119.
- "Woman and the Public." Wives and Daughters Apr. 1893: 110.
- "Beauty in Dress." Wives and Daughters May 1893: 130-131.
- "Browsing in a Library." [B.T.] Wives and Daughters May 1893: 128-29.
- "Browsing in a Library." [B.T.] Wives and Daughters June 1893: 148-49.
- "Woman Suffrage in the Provincial Legislature." Wives and Daughters June 1893: 150-151.
- "A Word or Two on Delsarte." Wives and Daughters July 1893: 178.
- "Browsing in a Library." [B.T.] Wives and Daughters July 1893: 168.
- "Browsing in a Library." [B.T.] Wives and Daughters Aug. 1893. 188.
- "Dr. Salisbury's Method. Wives and Daughters Aug. 1893: 187.
- "A Strong-Minded Woman in Ancient Fiction." Wives and Daughters Sept. 1893: 209.
- "Browsing in a Library." [E.W.] Wives and Daughters Sept. 1893: 206-07.
- "Browsing in a Library." [E.W.] Wives and Daughters Oct. 1893: 226-27.
- "Notes on the World's Fair." Wives and Daughters Oct. 1893: 236-37.
- "The Big Boy at Holcomb's." The Youth's Companion 21 May 1896: 3.
- "Mr. Galloway's Mothers." Saturday Night 16 May 1903: 4.
- "An Half-Ounce Playmate." The Youth's Companion 13 Apr. 1905: 181.
- "Introduction". The Collected Poems of Isabella Valancy Crawford. Ed. John W. Garvin. Toronto: Briggs, 1905. 15-29.
- "The Hired Man's Story." Globe [Toronto] 4 May 1907, Saturday Magazine Section: 12.
- "A Winter Picnic." Globe [Toronto] 5 Mar. 1910, Saturday Magazine Section: 2.
- "The House in the Willow." Globe [Toronto] 16 Apr. 1910, Saturday Magazine Section: 2.
- "Representative Women: Agnes Maule Machar." Globe [Toronto] 9 July 1910, Saturday Magazine Section: 4.
- "Henmindedness." Globe [Toronto] 6 Aug. 1910, Saturday Magazine Section: 3.
- "A Word for the Rooster." Globe [Toronto] 10 Sept. 1910, Saturday Magazine Section: 5.
- "The Corn Roast in Uncle Henry's Wood." Globe [Toronto] 8 Oct. 1910, Saturday Magazine Section: 5.
- "Pigheadedness." Globe [Toronto] 10 Dec. 1910, Saturday Magazine Section: 3.
- "Jane and the Chicken Man." Globe [Toronto] 1 Apr. 1911, Saturday Magazine Section: 2-3.
- "A Lovers' Quarrel." Canadian Magazine 39 (1912): 163-67.
- "My Father As I Knew Him." Canadian Friend Feb. 1915: 6-9.
- "On Becoming Eighty." Saturday Night 26 June 1937: 1.
- "Silent Meeting." Saturday Night 6 Nov. 1937: 3.
- "Advancing Years." Saturday Night 20 Aug. 1938: 31.
- "Introduction". Homer Watson: Artist and Man. By Frank E. Page. Kitchener, ON: Commercial Printing, 1939, xi.
