= Lily Osman Adams =

Canadian painter

- Born: 1865; Toronto, Canada West
- Died: 1945; Toronto, Ontario, Canada
- Occupation: Painter
- Known for: Trilliums (AGO)

Lily Osman Adams (1865–1945) was a Canadian painter. She worked mainly in pastel and watercolor, and depicted landscapes, flowers and still life.

== Early years ==
Lily Osman Adams was born in Toronto in 1865. She studied privately under Farquhar McGillivray Knowles (1859–1932) and Lucius Richard O'Brien (1832–1899). She attended the Toronto Art School where she was taught by John William Beatty (1869–1941). In New York, she studied at Columbia University and the Art Students League of New York under Arthur Wesley Dow and John F. Carlson. She also studied at the University of Toronto, St John's Wood Art School, the Ontario School of Art and the Newlyn School of Art, Newlyn, England, under Stanhope Forbes. In her later years, she studied under L. Birge Harrison at Woodstock, New York.

== Style ==
Adams is a painter who specialized in landscapes, flowers, and still life genres. Adams’ primary mediums are watercolour, pastel, and occasionally oil paint. Her landscapes are evocative of the impressionist movement where she utilizes bold brushstrokes to depict nature.

== Career ==
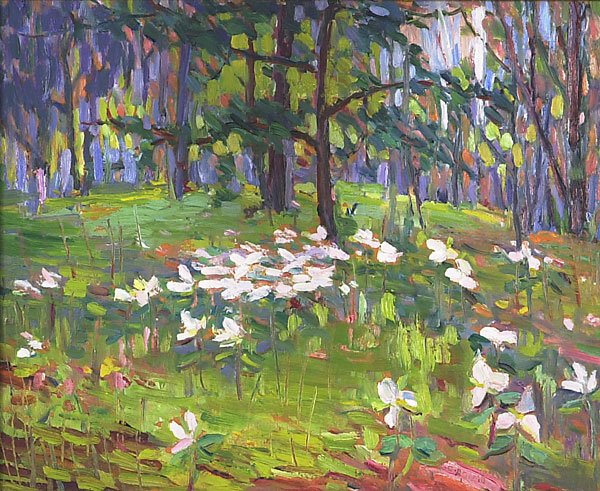
Trilliums c. 1910

Adams mostly used pastel and water color, and painted landscapes, flowers and still life. She also used oil at times.

In 1896, the Woman's Art Association of Canada (WAAC) decided to commission a Canadian State Dinner Service to be painted on china by members of the association. The artists included Lily Osman Adams, Alice Egan (1872–1972) and Phoebe Amelia Watson (1858–1947). Adams painted eighteen plates with underwater designs as part of the service.

Adams exhibited at the Royal Canadian Academy of Arts from 1904 to 1936. Her work was shown at the Canadian National Exhibition in 1907, and at the Ontario Society of Artists from 1903 to 1920. In 1924, she had a joint exhibition with Minnie Kallmeyer for which Saturday Night gave her work a favorable review. She held annual exhibitions at her studio on Irwin Street in Toronto during the 1930s.

Lily Osman Adams died in Toronto in 1945. One of her pastel studies of trilliums is held by the Art Gallery of Ontario.

== Sources ==
- "ADAMS, Lily Osman". Canadian Women Artists History Initiative. Concordia University.
- Lerner, Loren R.; Williamson, Mary F. (1991-01-01). Art and Architecture in Canada: A Bibliography and Guide to the Literature. University of Toronto Press. ISBN 978-0-8020-5856-0.
- "Lily Osman Adams". Canadian Museum of History.
- MacDonald, Colin S. (2014). "Lily Osman Adams". Robert Gallery. Archived from the original on 2014-07-17.
- "The Artists". Canadian Museum of History.
