= McGeouch =

McGeouch is a surname. Notable people with the surname include:

- Darren McGeouch (born 1990), Scottish footballer
- Dylan McGeouch (born 1993), Scottish footballer

== See also ==
- McGeoch
- McGeough
