= Phoebe Watson =

Phoebe Watson may refer to:

- Phoebe Amelia Watson (1858–1947), a Canadian painter who decorated china and also worked in watercolors and oils
- Phoebe Holcroft Watson (1898–1980), a tennis player from the United Kingdom

== See also ==
- Phebe Watson (1876–1964), South Australian educator and teachers' union activist
