= Women's Art Club =

The Women's Art Club may refer to

- National Association of Women Artists, a United States organisation for women involved in fine art, founded in 1889 as the Women's Art Club
- Women's Art Association of Canada, a Canadian association for women artists, founded in 1890 as the Women's Art Club
