= Kallmeyer =

Kallmeyer is a German surname. Notable people with the surname include:

- Helmut Kallmeyer (1910–2006), German chemist and Action T4 perpetrator
- Minnie Kallmeyer (1882–1947), American-born Canadian artist
