= Lady Margaret Taylor =

Canadian teacher, Presbyterian missionary organiser, and social reformer

Lady Margaret Vallance Taylor
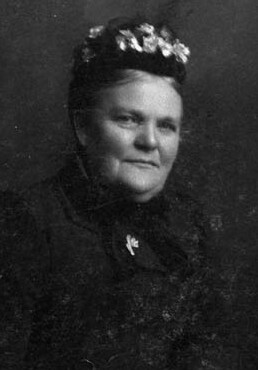
- Born: Margaret Vallance; 1 April 1840; Hamilton, Upper Canada
- Died: 26 December 1922 (aged 82); Winnipeg, Manitoba, Canada
- Resting place: Hamilton Cemetery, Hamilton, Ontario
- Education: Toronto Normal School (first-class certificate, 1864)
- Occupations: Teacher; Presbyterian missionary organiser; Social reformer
- Years active: 1860s–1910s
- Known for: President of the National Council of Women of Canada (1899–1902; 1910–1911); founder of the Aberdeen Association; child-welfare advocacy
- Spouse: Thomas Wardlaw Taylor (m. 20 October 1864; died 1917)

Margaret Vallance Taylor (née Vallance; 1 April 1840 – 26 December 1922) was a Canadian teacher and social reformer, who for half a century promoted women's missionary work, child welfare, travelling libraries and public-health initiatives in Ontario and Manitoba. Twice president of the National Council of Women of Canada (NCWC), she also founded Winnipeg's Children's Home and, at the suggestion of Lady Aberdeen, organised the nationwide Aberdeen Association to ship books and magazines to remote Prairie settlements.

== Early life and education ==
Margaret Vallance was the fourth of seven children born to customs officer Hugh Vallance and Ann Little, a Scottish immigrant whose first husband had died of cholera soon after the family reached Hamilton in 1832. She received a “good basic education” at a private school that stressed deportment and social graces. When her father died in 1856 the family finances collapsed, delaying her professional training until she could enter the Toronto Normal School in 1863. She graduated the following year with a first-class teaching certificate and began teaching in Bartonville (now part of Hamilton). Her school was located directly across from Thomas Wardlaw Taylor’s residence. During her time there, she caught his attention and they later married in 1864, making her his second wife. The couple had no children together.

== Career and reform work ==
=== Presbyterian missionary work ===
Taylor joined the newly formed Woman’s Foreign Missionary Society of the Presbyterian Church in Canada (WFMS) in 1876. After the family moved to Winnipeg in 1883, Sir Thomas having been appointed to the Manitoba Court of Queen’s Bench, she founded the WFMS’s first western auxiliary (1884) and later served as president of the Augustine Church auxiliary and vice-president of the Winnipeg presbyterial.

=== Child-welfare initiatives ===
An early member of the Christian Women's Union of Winnipeg (1883), Taylor steered the establishment of the Children’s Home of Winnipeg (1885) and chaired its board from 1887 to 1899. Under her leadership the Home cared for more than 1,200 children in its first two decades. The Home cared for destitute children and aimed to place them in foster or adoptive homes.

=== Aberdeen Association ===
Prompted by Lady Aberdeen’s address at a Winnipeg women’s meeting on 19 October 1890, Taylor organized the Aberdeen Association within a month and served as its president until 1899. She drafted detailed regulations to ensure a steady flow of “instructive and entertaining” literature, including religious, agricultural, and scientific periodicals, fashionable magazines, children's books, history, biography, and fiction, to settlers in the Northwest. Under Taylor's leadership, the Association mailed 300–400 parcels of literature each month to isolated Prairie households, with free carriage arranged through the post office, steamship, and railway companies. At its peak, the Association operated 12 to 16 branches nationwide, aided by these transportation partnerships

=== Winnipeg Local Council of Women ===
A founding vice-president of the Winnipeg Local Council of Women (1894), Taylor served as its second president (1896–99). The council campaigned successfully for police matrons, improved prison conditions for women and the 1897 opening of the Girls’ Home of Welcome for immigrant women.

=== National Council of Women of Canada ===
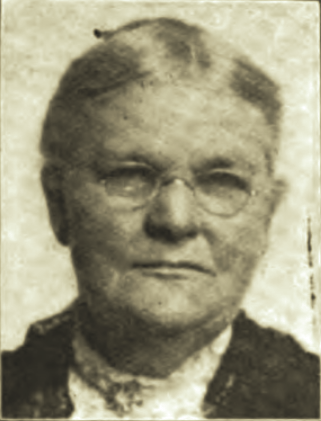
Taylor, c. 1909

Taylor succeeded Lady Aberdeen as National Council of Women of Canada president in 1899 and guided the organisation through 1902; she served again from 1910 to 1911 after the sudden death of Lady Edgar. She resisted proposals to reduce the council's annual meetings, arguing that yearly sessions were vital despite their cost, and repeatedly tackled the body's chronic funding shortfalls. During her terms the NCWC her actions included:

- Expanded the fledgling Canadian Red Cross from six to 50 branches during the Second Boer War;
- Launched a survey of Canadian women's legal status (1911);
- Advocated kindergartens, supervised playgrounds, water-filtration plants and stricter food inspection;
- Pressed for custodial care of “feeble-minded” women and a national women's labour exchange.

=== Position on women’s suffrage ===
Taylor's Presbyterian and maternalist convictions did not extend to women's suffrage. In 1910, she told National Council of Women of Canada delegates that manhood suffrage had proved “venal” and argued that doubling the electorate would simply “double political corruption.”

== Later life, and legacy ==
Taylor resumed Red Cross work during World War I in 1914, but poor health soon curtailed her public activity. Following Sir Thomas's death in 1917 she divided her time between Hamilton and Winnipeg. She died in Winnipeg on 26 December 1922 and was buried in Hamilton Cemetery beside her husband. Scholars of Canadian women's history credit Taylor's “strength, clear thinking and sound judgement” for shaping the NCWC into an influential voice in public policy.

== Selected works ==
- “Report of the Aberdeen Association for 1894.” Winnipeg: Aberdeen Association, 1895.
- “The National Council of Women: Its Aim and Duty” (presidential address, 1910). Toronto: NCWC pamphlet, 1910.

== See also ==
- National Council of Women of Canada
- Traveling library
- Woman's Missionary Society (Presbyterian Church in Canada)
