= Canadian Historical Dinner Service =

204-piece eight-course dinner service

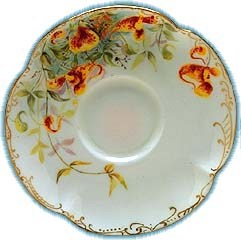
- Coffee cup saucer – Jewel-weed; Anna Lucy Kelley (1849–1920)
- Artists: Alice Egan, Lily Osman Adams, Phoebe Amelia Watson and others
- Year: 1897
- Type: Dinner service
- Medium: Painted ceramics
- Subject: Canada
- Dimensions: 24 place settings for eight courses
- Owner: National Trust for Scotland, Edinburgh

The Canadian Historical Dinner Service, originally called the Cabot Commemorative State Dinner Service, is 204-piece eight-course dinner service with 24 place settings of hand-painted porcelain. It was created in 1896–97 to commemorate the 400th anniversary of the first visit to Canada by a European, John Cabot. The illustrations all have Canadian subjects, and no two pieces are the same.

== Background ==
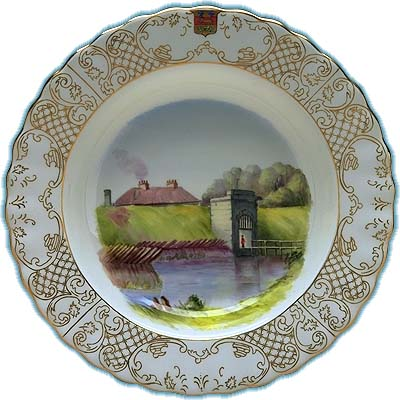
Soup plate Entrance to Fort Lennox by Clara Elizabeth Galbreaith (1864–1941)

In 1896 the Woman's Art Association of Canada (WAAC) decided to commission a state dinner service to be painted on china by members of the association. The WAAC formed a Ceramic Committee, which pulled together photographs and drawings of old forts, battlefields and other historical scenes. The committee also assembled reproductions of Canadian game, fish, shells, ferns and flowers. A competition of Canadian ceramic artists was held, and the work was divided among them "according to their individual proficiency in the painting of various subjects." The artists were to represent each province of Canada. In fact the chosen artists were from Ontario, Quebec and Nova Scotia. Eight of the artists were from Toronto.

Mary Ella Dignam, first president of the Women's Art Association of Canada, was the driving force behind production of the dinner service. Dignam supervised the work of Alice Egan and other Ontario and Quebec artists. These included Lily Osman Adams (1865–1945) and Phoebe Amelia Watson (1858–1947). The dinner service for eight courses with 24 place settings was to commemorate the 400th anniversary in 1897 of John Cabot's discovery of Canada. Sixteen Canadian women artists were chosen to paint the 204 (Note: One source gives 192 pieces. Another gives 204 pieces. A third source inexplicably gives 208. 8 courses and 24 settings would give 192 pieces, assuming a cup and saucer is considered one piece. The discrepancy between the first two may be due to whether or not the twelve coffee cups and saucers of Limoges porcelain are counted.) china blanks with Canadian historical scenes and birds, ferns, fish, flowers and fruits. They were given details of the plates or cups and saucers they were to paint, and worked independently.

The WAAC arranged to obtain the china blanks. According to the Secretary of the WAAC, E .J . Thompson, "our object was to get nothing but the best, for we want our State Set to be as near perfect as possible ... Sir Henry Doulton has taken quite an interest in our State Set and has given us the only plain china with the red factory mark that has ever left the factory to be decorated, and has sent us their best china and at the lowest price ." Mary E. Dignam wrote to Alice Egan that the blanks would cost $6.60 a dozen to the artist. "Your best work is expected - not less than $60.00 will be asked per dozen in disposing of the set, proceeds to go to the artist, less 10%. Details of border of gold edge and W.A.A. stamp will be sent you, when you are ready for them. The pieces are to be finished by May 18th [1897]." The dinner service was not assembled as whole, inspected and approved until 7 July 1897.

== Plates ==
All of the plates are painted on circular bone china blanks from Doulton & Co. of Burslem, Staffordshire, England, with twenty-four plates of each type. All but the desert plates have scalloped rims, and all but the game plates and dessert plates are bordered with a gilt scroll and trellis design. The soup plates each have a shallow bowl decorated with a historic Canadian landscape. The heraldic shield of the landscape's province is included on the border. Clara Elizabeth Galbreaith of Hamilton, Ontario, painted twelve of the soup plates, and Phoebe Amelia Watson of Doon, Ontario, painted the other twelve.

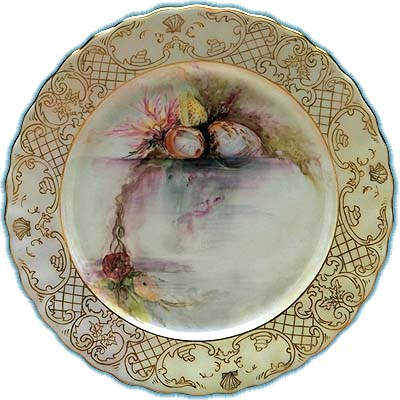
Fish plate Cytherea gibbia, Halymenia ligulata by Lily Osman Adams (1865-1945)

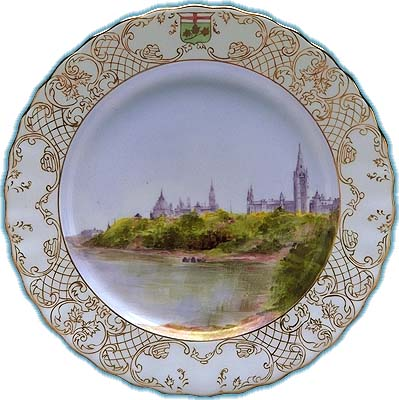
Dinner plate Parliament Buildings and Ottawa River by Martha Logan (1863-1937)

The fish plates illustrate Canadian freshwater and saltwater fish, shells and seaweeds. Lily Osman Adams of Toronto painted eighteen of the fish plates, with underwater designs, and Louise Couen, also of Toronto, painted the other six. The dinner plates show historic landscapes, and also include the heraldic shield of the province in the border design. Margaret Irvine of Toronto and Martha Logan, originally from Hartford, Connecticut, each painted twelve of the dinner plates. Margaret Irvine was born in County Fermanagh, Ireland, sometime between 1847 and 1856. She was the daughter of William Irvine and Jane Dignam, who came to Canada from County Fermanagh, Ireland, between 1846 and 1859. The Irvine Family settled in London, Middlesex, Ontario, Canada.

The game plates each depict a different Canadian game bird, and the borders are decorated with plants from the bird's habitat. Small maple leaf motifs decorate the rims. Alice Egan of Halifax, Nova Scotia, was chosen to paint twelve of the game plates, and Elizabeth Whitney of St. Catherine's Street in Montreal to paint the other twelve. They were asked to decide how they would divide the task. Alice wrote "I chose the ducks, or rather my father did. (Note: Alice Egan's father, Colonel Thomas J. Egan, was a respected taxidermist.) My father was afraid that other artists would paint the birds with deformed legs and wings, as they paid no attention to bird's joints. Her father was a hunter, and she used his Audubon books as guides for her illustrations.

The salad plates illustrate different Canadian ferns. Justina A. Harrison of Toronto painted twelve salad plates and M. Roberts, of whom little is known other than that she lived in Toronto, painted the other twelve. The cheese plates show Canadian songbirds. Hattie Proctor of Toronto painted twelve of the cheese plates and Elizabeth Whitney painted the other twelve. Whitney also painted twelve game plates. The dessert plates show wild or cultivated Canadian fruits. Alice M. Judd of Hamilton and Margaret McClung of St. Catharines each painted twelve of the dessert plates.

== Coffee cups and saucers ==
There are twenty-four coffee cups and saucers of bone china from Doulton & Co., and twelve coffee cups and saucers of Limoges porcelain. The twenty-four Doulton coffee cups and saucers are lobed, as are their saucers, and have scroll handles. The cups and saucers have gilts rims and handles, and are decorated with Canadian wildflowers. The Limoges coffee cups have straight sides and ring handles, with circular saucers. Twelve of the coffee cups and saucers were painted by Jane Bertram of Toronto, twelve by Juliet Howson of Toronto and twelve by Anna Lucy Kelley of Yarmouth, Nova Scotia.

== Reception ==
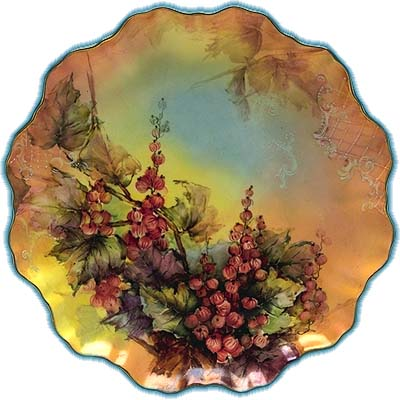
Dessert plate Redcurrants Alice M. Judd (died 1943)

In July 1897 the service was put on display in Toronto. It was then exhibited in Montreal and Quebec City. The finished product was well received. It was called "a most valuable and interesting work on a large scale, accomplished by the most representative talent in the Dominion ... it is hoped that it will be accepted by the government and placed where it may be seen and studied and preserved to mark the first era in ceramics in Canada." However, the government was unwilling to pay the asking price of CDN$1,000.

Mary Dignam and Lady Edgar, wife of the speaker of the House of Commons of Canada, asked some members of the Senate and House of Commons for help. They arranged for the service to be bought at the artists' prices by private subscriptions from members of the Senate and House of Commons of Canada. On 13 June 1898 the service was formally presented by the members to Lady Aberdeen after the end of the term of her husband as Governor General. In accepting the gift, Lady Aberdeen made an eloquent speech that ended,

These painted scenes will remind us of many voices from prairie, lake and river which will haunt us in our home, but there will be an undertone of deeper voices which will speak of human love and friendships and these voices will form a choir invisible and will speak to us in the truest music of Canada.

The service was shipped to Scotland and placed on display in Haddo House, home of the Countess and Earl of Aberdeen.

This is still its home, although the house and the ceramic display are now the property of the National Trust for Scotland.
