= Gertrude Richardson =

English-born pacifist, feminist, and socialist (1875–1946)

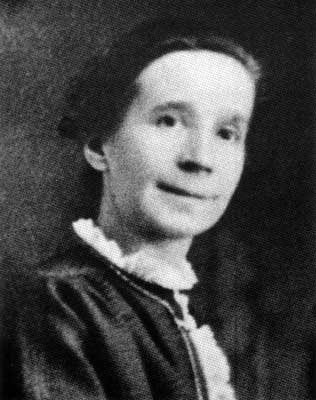
- Gertrude Richardson (c. 1912)
- Born: Gertrude Matilda Twilley; 1875,01; Leicester, England
- Died: 1946,09,05; Brandon, Manitoba
- Occupations: Socialist, feminist

Gertrude Richardson (born Gertrude Matilda Twilley; 1875–1946) was an English-born pacifist, feminist and socialist who was prominent in the fight for women's rights in Manitoba, Canada before World War I (1914–18). During the war she became disillusioned with the women's movement, since many of its members supported the fighting. She suffered from recurrent physical and mental illness after the war, and ended her life in a mental hospital.

== Early years ==
Gertrude Matilda Twilley was born in Leicester, England in 1875 to a working-class family. She married, but was abandoned by her husband within a year. The marriage was never consummated, but was also never annulled or invalidated. Her family was involved in the peace movement during the Second Boer War (1899–1902). Gertrude collected petitions and gave out anti-war literature for the Stop the War Committee. She had poor health, and the stress of the war and the death of her father seem to have contributed to a nervous breakdown. She was periodically hospitalized from 1901 to 1906.

Gertrude Twilley was deeply religious, and felt that a true Christian should feel compassion for all suffering people and should work for economic and social justice. For the sake of justice women should have the vote, and women's moral sensitivity could work good against the greed and violence of men, Gertrude therefore became involved in the women's suffrage movement in Leicester. She also wrote for the Midland Free Press, a weekly socialist paper published in the Midlands of England.

== Manitoba ==
In 1911 Gertrude and her mother moved to Canada to stay with her brother Fred on his homestead in the Roaring River district of Manitoba, to the south of the town of Swan River. Gertrude settled in easily, and began to publish verse (Note: Richardson was not a gifted poet, and her work has not stood up to the test of time.) and articles in the Swan River Star. The Manitoba Grain Growers' Association had taken a position in favor of suffrage in 1911. The Roaring River Suffrage Association was founded in March 1912, with both men and women as members. Getrude Twilley was president and her sister Fannie Livesey was secretary. They thought they were the first suffrage group in Manitoba. (Note: In fact, Icelandic settlers had established suffrage groups before 1912, and the Political Equality League was founded in Winnipeg in March 1912, so the Roaring River Suffrage Association was not the first.) Gertrude married Robert Richardson, a successful local farmer, and took his name. He was at least twenty-five years older than Gertrude. They adopted a child. (Note: There is some mystery about the adoption. After nineteen years, when Gertrude was hospitalized and the status of her second marriage was under question, the child's birth mother reappeared and became a "housekeeper" to Gertrude’s husband.)

Getrude Richardson became involved in the local Missionary Society, and eventually became its president. She also co-founded a Home Economics Society at which women in the region exchanged recipes and learned about trade so they could understand and influence their husbands' business dealings. She was invited to contribute to Woman's Century, the organ of the National Council of Women of Canada. Her main interest was the Suffrage Association. This was closely associated with the Grain Growers, which held meetings in the local schoolhouse. The men of the Grain Growers were implicitly expected to support women's suffrage in exchange for the ample refreshments supplied at their meetings by the women .

The Roaring River suffragists supported the Liberal William Henry Sims in the 1914 provincial election, although Richardson was uncomfortable with identifying suffrage with a political party. Nellie McClung came to Swan River and stayed with the Richardsons. She addressed a women's meeting in the afternoon and a packed meeting of both sexes in the evening. William Henry Sims was returned for Swan River, but the Conservatives led by Rodmond Roblin were the overall winners in the province.

== World War I ==
Richardson actively opposed World War I (1914–18). She was against conscription and in favor of an early end to the war with a just peace settlement. Her family was divided. One brother enlisted while another was a conscientious objector and was jailed. There was a natural link between pacifism and maternal feminism. Augusta Stowe-Gullen (1857–1943) said in 1915 that "when women have a voice in national and international affairs, war will cease forever. This became an increasingly hard position to support as World War I dragged on, but Richardson stood firm. She wrote that "war and militarism are the bitterest of all foes of womanhood, wifehood, motherhood and the home". Unlike other feminist writers she did not blame the deterioration in morality on the soldiers or the loose women who tempted them. She wrote "Shall we who drive them to the hell of war condemn their departure from our standard of morals? Ours is the responsibility, not only for the blighted purity, but for the maimed forms, the shattered brains, the sightless eyes."

In 1915 the Roaring River Suffrage Association made itself a branch of the Manitoba Political Equality League. Richardson helped organize sections of the league in other Swan River valley communities. In February 1915 she attended the Political Equality League's convention in Winnipeg, and joined a deputation that confronted the Tory Premier Rodmond Roblin. The next day Richardson was elected first vice-president of the provincial division, with responsibility for organizing Equality groups throughout Manitoba. Richardson later became disillusioned with the women's movement, which failed to represent "women’s traditional values of peace and nurture". Some leaders of the movement supported the war. She abandoned the suffrage movement, and also abandoned organized religion.

Harriet Dunlop Prenter may have encouraged Richardson to contribute to Canadian Forward from June 1917 onward. Richardson came to believe that "true socialism is Christianity". Richardson was both a maternal feminist and a Marxist. She called on Canadian women to "arise and save our men" and blamed the war on "the blood-stained Capitalists of the world."

== Last years ==
After the war Richardson tried to help the civilians in the countries that had been defeated and were now suffering from an embargo. She began to suffer from illness and showed signs of mental stress, including loss of appetite, sleeplessness and depression. She suffered from aural and visual hallucinations. She was hospitalized in Winnipeg in 1921. She was released in 1925, but did not fully recover physically or mentally. In 1930 she was admitted to the Hospital for Mental Diseases in Brandon, Manitoba. She remained there, sometimes lucid and sometimes suffering from hallucinations, until her death from heart failure in 1946.

== Sources ==
- Campbell, Allison (Spring–Summer 1998). "Review: Barbara Roberts, A Reconstructed World: A Feminist Biography of Gertrude Richardson". Manitoba History (35).
- Gutkin, Harry; Gutkin, Mildred (Autumn 1996). ""Give us our due!" How Manitoba Women Won the Vote". Manitoba History (32).
- LeGates, Marlene (2012-09-10). In Their Time: A History of Feminism in Western Society. Routledge. ISBN 978-1-136-77903-9.
- Roberts, Barbara (1996-06-18). Reconstructed World: A Feminist Biography of Gertrude Richardson. McGill-Queen's Press - MQUP. ISBN 978-0-7735-1394-5.
