= Christian Women's Union of Winnipeg =

Charity in Manitoba, Canada

- Abbreviation: CWU
- Formation: February 1883
- Type: Nonprofit
- Location: Winnipeg, Manitoba, Canada
- Region served: Winnipeg
- Services: Residential accommodations
- Fields: women; children; aged
- Affiliations: Protestant
- Funding: Government grant; civic grant

The Christian Women's Union of Winnipeg (sometimes, Christian Woman's Union; acronym CWU) was a women's charity established in Winnipeg, Manitoba, Canada, in February 1883. One of the oldest charitable institutions of the city, it originated the Women's Boarding House, the Children's Home, the Maternity Hospital, the Woman's Home, and the Old Folks' Home, all of which became charities of the city. The CWU was a Protestant society drawing its members from the different Protestant denominations in the city. The workings of the union were non-sectarian. There was no religious component required of those seeking admission to the CWU's facilities, and the inmates were allowed to follow their religious beliefs. It operated with Government and civic grants.

== Establishment ==
On February 21, 1883, an announcement was made in the Manitoba Free Press calling for a meeting of the Christian Women's Union to be held later that day at the Historical Society. The meeting had been called for the purpose of forming a union of Christian women for the promotion of the welfare of the women of Winnipeg, and to provide a boarding house for them and a day nursery for the infants of working women. At that meeting, the following were elected officers pro tem: President, Mrs. Galton, she having been one of the leading members in the movement; Vice-President, Mrs. R. J. Whitla; Treasurer, Miss Jazdowski; Committee of Management, Mrs. Tuttle, Mrs. Joseph Greenfield, Mrs. Campbell, Mrs. Mercer, Miss Mercer, Mrs. Banning, Mrs. Jas. H. Ashdown, Mrs. F. P. Roblin, Mrs. Irwin, Mrs. R. D. Richardson, Mrs. Burkholder, Mrs. McCausland, and Miss Wood. The meeting then adjourned. Subsequently, the first meeting of the committee was held, when it was decided to ask four women from each church congregation in the city to become ex-officio members of the committee. Mrs. Amos Rowe was appointed to negotiate for the loan of the old government building, to be used for the purposes of the Union, and for permission to convert it into a home. It was decided that the next meeting of the committee would be held inMrs. F. B. Roblin's room at the Douglas House, when subscription cards would be distributed.

The next meeting of the members of the CWU committee was held at the room of the Board of Education, Bigg's Block, Main Street, on March 16, and the general committee of the CWU met again on April 27. Those women had a strong desire was to bring together women of different Protestant denominations and varied predilections and to unite them in some important work in which they could all be interested. The proposed work naturally took the form of work among women.

== Incorporation ==
Collectors were appointed to raise funds and the city was divided into districts for this purpose. In order to receive a Government grant, an Act of Incorporation was applied for early in 1894 under the name of the Christian Women's Union of Winnipeg. The Act was passed by the Legislature in April of that year and a grant of $500 was given ($250 in 1899). The annual fees were $3.00; life membership, $50. The women applying for this Act were Mary E. J. Aikens, honorary president; Catherine Rowe, president; Eleanor Whitla, vice-president; Mary Jazdrowski, treasurer; Annie Monk, corresponding secretary; Jemima Irwin, recording secretary; Marion Bryce, first director; and Matilda Lynch, second director. To conduct the affairs of the corporation, a Board of Management, consisting of thirty women, and an Advisory Board of six men was established.

A change was assented to the CWU's article of incorporation on April 28, 1921:

The body incorporated by this Act may acquire by purchase or otherwise any lands or tenements, or any interest therein which may be required by the corporation in carrying out its corporate objects, and the said corporation may from time to time take or hold by gift inter vivos, or by devise, or bequest, any lands or tenements or interest therein; but the said lands, tenements or interest unless required for actual use by the corporation shall not be held by the said corporation for a longer period than ten years from the acquisition thereof, and within such period they shall respectively be absolutely disposed of by the said corporation so that it no longer retain any interest therein.

== Works ==
=== Women's Boarding House ===
The opening conversation of the Women's Boarding House, under the direction of the ChWU, took place on May 15, 1883, at the Home, which was the late residence of Andrew Bannatyne), on Bannatyne Street East. A large group of influential people were present. The CWU committee prepared entertainment for their guests, the proceedings being informal and social in character. An address was delivered by the Rev. O. Fortin, explanatory of the purpose for which the home had been founded, namely, as a boarding-house tor young women, such as convalescents from the hospital, immigrants, and others having no homes of their own. Seven young women occupied the Home at the time, with the highest number at any one time having been nine. These numbers did not represent the whole number of those that have been benefited as some were almost constantly leaving and others arriving to take their places. It was determined that as the objects and recommendations of the Home became more widely known, there would be many more who would want to take vantage of the opportunities which the Home afforded. The building was large and commodious. Bible readings were conducted every Tuesday evening by the women of the Union. A reading room had been established, with something of a library also, which women from the city were invited to attend. The city papers and a number of books which were kept on hand. The Bannatyne residence was located on the river bank, with its grounds extending from Bannatyne to McDermot Street.

This institution was later moved to a smaller house on Hargrave Street, but it was not taken advantage of by those for whom it was intended-it rather seemed to attract the idle and incompetent, so in a short time, it was thought advisable to have it closed.

=== Maternity Hospital ===
In the meantime, with the approval of the leading physicians of the city, the society opened a Maternity Hospital in the Bannatyne building. The hospital was not designed only to benefit those who were poor, but also poor married women who were destitute of comforts in their own homes, which at that time, was common. There were also private wards for women coming from the country and from distant towns for the advantage of good medical care and nursing.

The Bannatyne building having been sold, the maternity hospital was moved in September 1884, to a large house formerly occupied by Sheriff Armstrong, at the foot of May Street, Point Douglas, and in 1886, it was again moved to the adjoining house, the former residence of Major Morice.

These frequent changes of residence shewed that the board were never altogether satisfied with the hospital quarters, and they were always aware that their accommodation came far short of the requirements of modern science. Among nearly 200 adult inmates, not one woman died. But two slight outbreaks of fever warned the directors of the risk to life they were running. They felt the necessity of erecting a proper building, but the medical men began to see in the state of advancement of the city, and in the interests of the Medical College, that it was time for the Maternity Hospital to be placed under the wing of the General Hospital. The women's union agreed with them, and towards the end of 1887, after the second fever outbreak, the Maternity Hospital was closed.

=== Children's Home ===
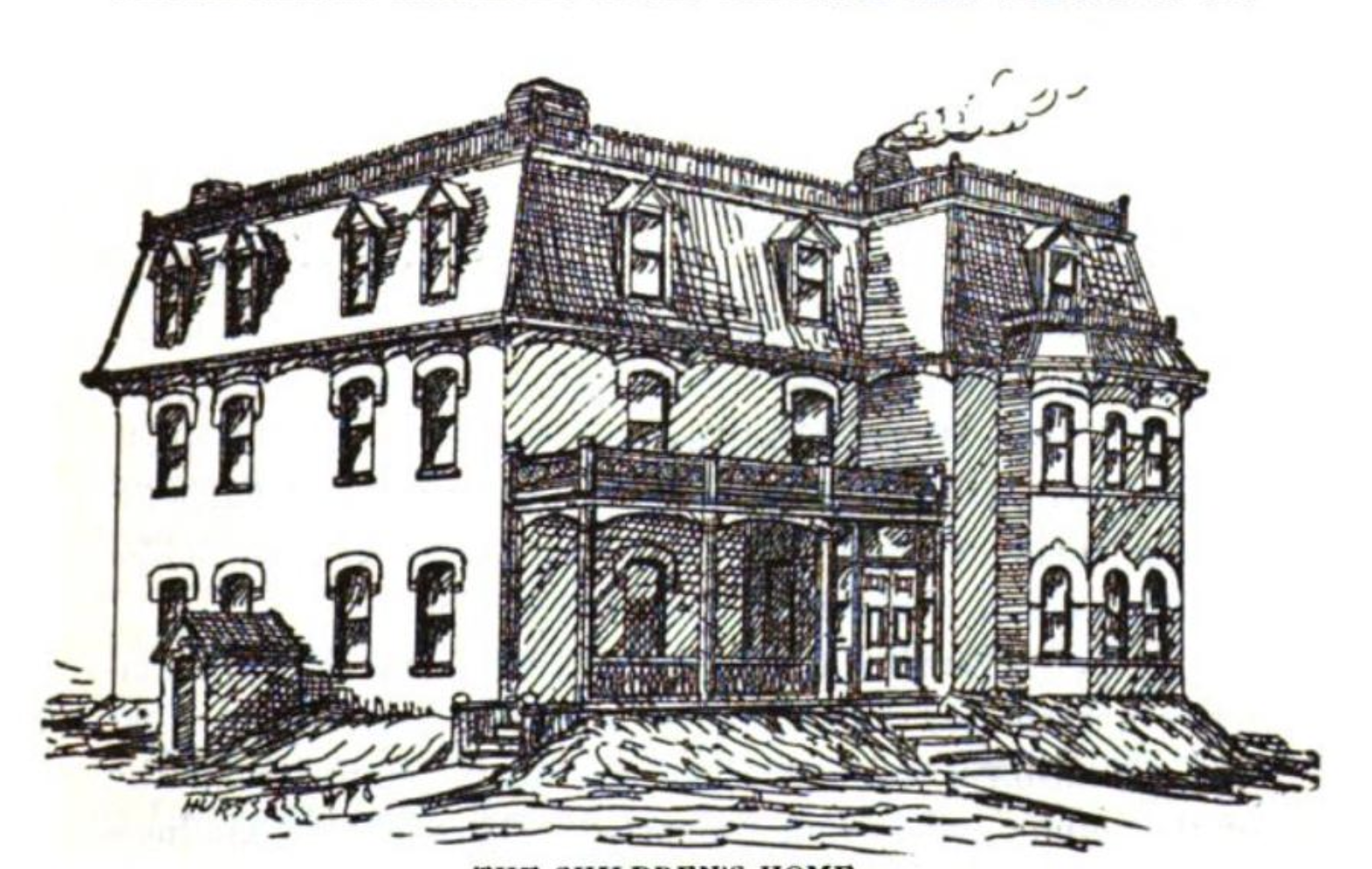
Children's Home (1899)

Lady Margaret Taylor, an early member of the CWU, steered the establishment of the Children’s Home of Winnipeg. On January 1, 1885, in a small building adjacent to the Maternity Hospital, the Children's Home was opened by the CWU. It was primarily for the benefit of the babies born in the hospital that the home was intended, but other needy children were admitted. The family soon outgrew the narrow limits of the premises, and in April of that same year, the home was moved to a larger home on Assiniboine Avenue, at the foot of Hargrave Street. In September 1896, it was again transferred to a larger building on Portage Avenue.

When the Children's Home was removed to a distance from the Maternity Hospital, a separate committee was appointed from the members of the CWU for its management, and this was a stepping stone to its finally becoming an independent institution.

Those who primarily sought to work among the children, applied for and obtained from the Legislature an Act of Incorporation as the board of management to the Children's Home in June 1897.

=== Refuge for women ===
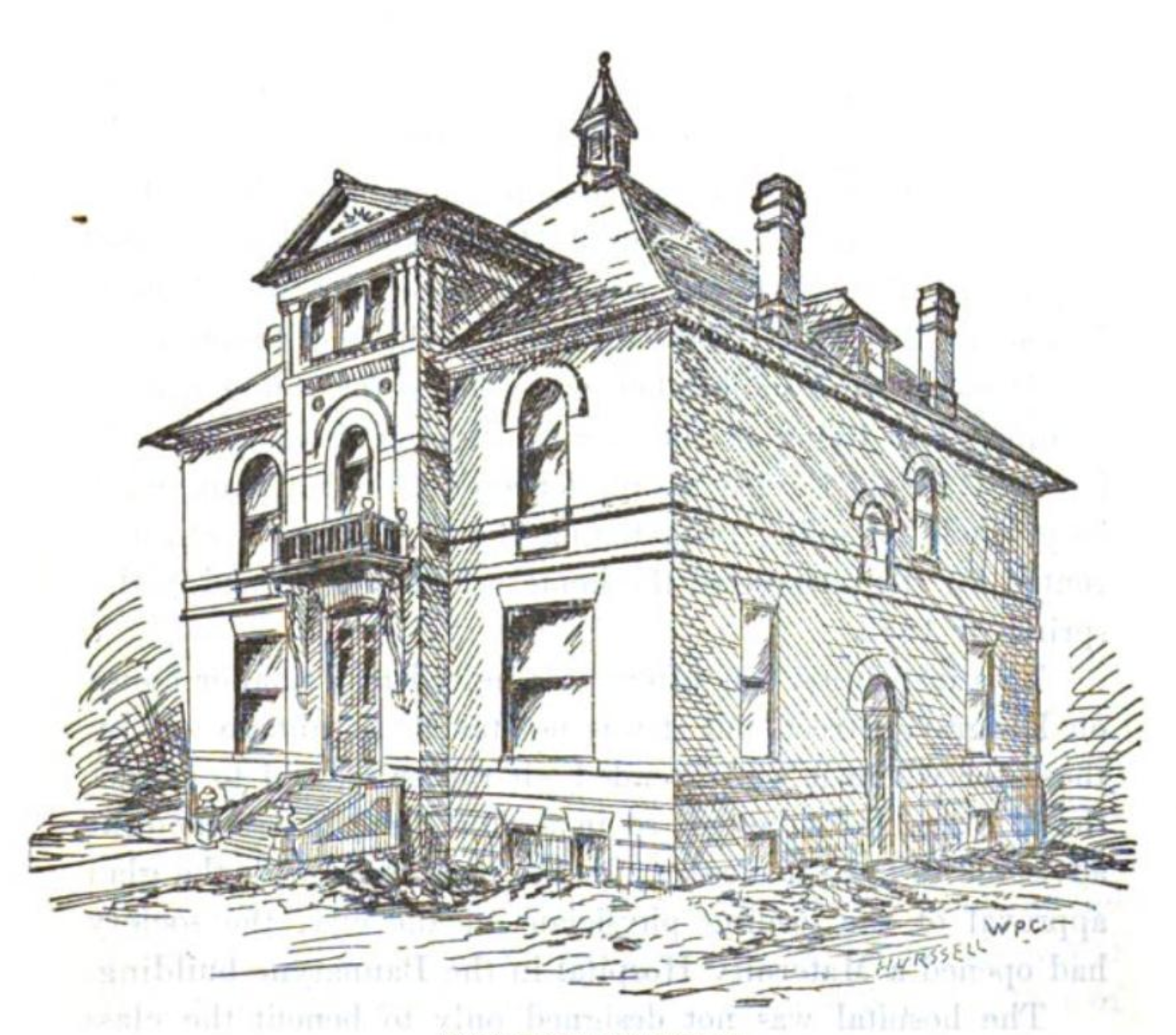
Woman's Home (1889)

After the Children's Home had been removed from under the care of the CWU, and the Maternity Hospital had become an adjunct of the General Hospital, the CWU had more opportunities for its work. In 1889, the union was chiefly engaged in canvassing the city for the means to erect the building, and it was met with a generous response. In March 1891, the new home was opened with a reception given to a large gathering. Since that time, it was found to be suitable for the work with a few improvements made from time to time. As since the opening of the Salvation Army Rescue Home, the more degraded cases were not admitted to the CWU home. It was suitable as a refuge for aged poor women as well as for married women coming to the city for medical care. There were no hard and fast lines drawn with regard to admission, excepting several very necessary ones in the by-laws, with each case considered when the application was made. The home sheltered about 60 inmates during the year.

There was one phase of work open to them akin to their former hospital work and springing out of it, but it was feared that this would not have public sympathy. They hesitated, but there was money in the treasury, over $1,000, and they felt that they should without delay put it to some useful purpose.

That the corporation was so wealthy came about as follows: From the opening of the Maternity Hospital, there had been admitted from time to time patients from the immigrant population. The General Hospital authorities, it was understood, were paid at the rate of 60 cents a day for each immigrant patient placed under their care and the board of the Maternity Hospital concluded that they should be paid at the same rate for each immigrant woman sent to them, and the bills were made out accordingly. Year after year, these accounts were disputed by the Dominion Government, but finally, the sum amounting to $900, was paid, just when the society seemed to require it least.

It was not long before the CWU became convinced that it was their duty to open up a refuge for women. The Maternity Hospital had served the double purpose of a hospital and a refuge and now the members of the union felt that an industrial home was needed for the kind of inmates that were likely to come under their care. But the inconveniences of a rented house for the purposes of the home determined the union to build, so as to have room for industrial branches to occupy and improve the inmates. The money on hand enabled the board to pay cash for spacious lots on an ideal site on MeDermot Avenue, west of Kate Street, as the work was so closely connected with that of the General Hospital.

==== Architecture and fittings ====
Messrs. Bruce & Madden were the contractors, and George Browne was the architect.

The plan consisted of a basement, ground floor, bedroom flat, and an attic. The basement contained the laundry, kitchen, dining room, store room, and a furnace room with coal bin. On the ground floor were the board room, matron's room, sewing room and parlor. The bedroom flat and attic contained sleeping accommodations for between 20 and 30 inmates, with bathroom. The building had a frontage of 40 feet 6 inches on McDermott Street, and a depth of 370 feet on Lydia Street. The foundation was of stone, and the superstructure wsa of brick. the exterior walls were strapped and lathed for back plastering, as well as for finished plastering. A 100-bbl. rain water tank was provided. The ground floor was reached from McDermott Street frontage by a flight of broad steps, and from Lydia Street by a side entrance. The building contained not only room for accommodation of the inmates, but also premises for laundry work and other types of labor in order to make the building, as far as possible, to be self-supporting.

The last installment of a mortgage debt upon the property was paid in 1895.

=== Old Folks' Home ===
In 1906, the CWU converted the Woman's Home on Lydia Street to became a rest home for the aged. Known then as the "Old Folks' Home", it was often referred to as the "Old Peoples' Home". Still later, it became the "Middlechurch Home of Winnipeg"). The location shifted in 1907. By 1913, it was under the auspices of the Woman's Christian Temperance Union. 25c. a day allowance for 1910, while the amount of 31,344 was expended for building a Home at Portage la Prairie for Aged and Infirm. that institutjon was entirely a Government one, and build and maintained absolutely at the expense and under the control of the Government. A further amount of some $50,000 cpaital expenditure was made on buildings in 1911. The expenditure for 1911, as required by "The charity Aid Act" of Manitoba in reference to the Old Folks' Home was $7,397. In 1958, the name changed to "Middlechurch Home of Winnipeg".

== Notable people ==
- President: Mrs. Galton, Mrs. Rowe, Mrs. George Bryce, Lady Schultz (Honorary president)
- Vice president: Mrs. Whitla, Mrs. Lynch, Mrs. Wesbrook, Mrs. J. B. Somerset (1st vice-president), Mrs. J. M. O'Loughlin (2nd vice-president)
- Secretary: Mrs. Irwin, Mrs. Doupe, Mrs. J. В. Monk, Mrs. (Dr.) Kerr, Mrs. (Dr.) Orton, Mrs. Culver, Mrs. C. Campbell, Mrs. T. J. McBride, Mrs. Atkinson, Mrs. A. V. McClenaghan (recording secretary), Mrs. J. J. Roy (corresponding secretary), Mrs. William Bathgate (financial secretary)
- Treasurer: Miss Jazdowski, Mrs. M. T. Hunter, Mrs. (Dr.) C. W. Clark.

== Legacy ==
The papers, president's addresses, reports (e.g., annual reports, religious instruction reports, and secretaries' reports), and related data of the CWU are held in the repositories of the Legislative Library of Winnipeg and Provincial Archives of Manitoba.
