= Marie Elwood =

Canadian museum curator (1932–2012)

Marie Elwood ONS
- Born: Marie Beatrice Elwood; January 30, 1932; Belfast, Northern Ireland
- Died: March 25, 2012 (aged 80); Halifax, Nova Scotia
- Occupations: Museum curator; historian
- Known for: Chief Curator of History at the Nova Scotia Museum from 1973 to 2012

Marie Beatrice Elwood ONS (30 January 1932 – 25 March 2012) was a Canadian museum curator and historian from Nova Scotia. She served as the Chief Curator of History at the Nova Scotia Museum from 1973 to 1992, and was among the first recipients of the Order of Nova Scotia in 2002.

== Early life and education ==
Marie Elwood was born on 30 January 1932 in Belfast, Northern Ireland. She attended Victoria College and Queen's University in Belfast, where she earned diplomas in Fine Art, Education, and Testimonium in Theology. In 1958, she moved to Toronto, Ontario, with her husband T. Neville Elwood and became a Canadian citizen. They subsequently moved to Halifax, Nova Scotia, in 1961, where they raised four children.

== Career ==
Elwood became the Chief Curator of History at the Nova Scotia Museum in 1973. During her time in this role, she oversaw the repatriation of Canadian artwork by John E. Woolford and John Singleton Copley, along with an archive from George Ramsay, 9th Earl of Dalhousie during his time as Lieutenant Governor. She also researched and developed exhibitions focusing on antique furniture, ceramics, and the work of Nova Scotian ceramic artist Alice Mary Hagen. Elwood retired as Chief Curator in November 1992.

Elwood served on the Canadian Cultural Property Export Review Board (CCPERB) from 1981 to 2003, and the Canadiana Foundation's Board of Directors from 1994 to 2008. She was the Curatorial Advisor for the National Capital Commission's Official Residences of Canada from 1991 to 2008, during which she provided guidance on furnishings and décor for Rideau Hall in Ottawa. From 1994 to 2004, Elwood was contracted by the Province of Nova Scotia to inventory, preserve, and restore the furnishings and decorations at Province House and Government House in Halifax. In 2004, she performed similar inventory work for the Legislative Assembly of New Brunswick. During renovations at Government House, Elwood discovered historic portraits of King George III and Queen Charlotte, which were subsequently restored and reframed.

Recognized as an authority on ceramics, Elwood was on the Acquisition Sub-Committee for Ceramics of the Art Gallery of Nova Scotia from 1994 to 1997. She traveled to Jingdezhen, China, where she delivered a lecture at the Jingdezhen Ceramic Institute.

Elwood was the designer of the first coat of arms of the Halifax Regional Municipality, used from 1997 to 1999. She designed the official logo of the Medical History Society of Nova Scotia in 2004.

== Awards and honours ==
Elwood was named a Fellow of the Royal Society of Arts in London, England in 1982, and received an honorary degree from the University of King's College in 1987. She was among the first members of the Order of Nova Scotia, appointed in 2002.

== Publications ==
=== Books ===
- Elwood, Marie (2009). The Egyptian Album of John Elliott Woolford. Lewiston: Edwin Mellen Press. ISBN 978-0-7734-3880-4.

=== Articles ===
- Elwood, Marie (October 1976). "Two Halifax Cabinetmakers". Canadian Collector. 11 (5). Toronto: Denmount Publishing Company: 16–19. OCLC 808141573.
- — (1980). "Historical and Curatorial Aspects of Furniture Conservation". Proceedings of the Furniture and Wooden Objects Symposium: 2–3 July, 1980. Ottawa: Canadian Conservation Institute. OCLC 7973699.
- — (1983). "The Weldon Collection". Canadian Collector. 18 (4). Toronto: Denmount Publishing Company: 26–29. OCLC 808141573.
- — (1987). "The Discovery and Repatriation of the Lord Dalhousie Papers". Archivaria. 24. Ottawa: Association of Canadian Archivists: 108–116. ISSN 0318-6954.
- — (1989). "Two 19th Century Collectors and Their Collections". American Ceramic Circle Journal. VII. New York: American Ceramic Circle. ISSN 0899-806X.
- — (1990). "Wicker, Rattan, Bamboo and Willow". The Occasional. Halifax: Nova Scotia Museum. ISSN 0704-5824.
- — (1996). "Two Wedgwood Services in Canada: Two Studies in Provenance". Josiah Wedgwood and The Potter's Arts. Toronto: Wedgwood International Seminar. pp. 159–162. ISBN 0-9680-8980-1.
- — (2002). "Their Few Possessions: Colonial Wares in British North America". Wedgwood: Art, Design, & Production. Toronto: Wedgwood International Seminar. pp. 46–54. ISBN 978-0-9680-8983-5.
