= Winnifred Kydd =

Canadian feminist, disarmament activist, and academic dean

Winnifred Kydd CBE
- Born: Mary Winnifred Kydd
- Died: 1969
- Education: Trafalgar School for Girls; McGill University, B.A.; McGill University, M.A.
- Occupations: Feminist activist; Disarmament activist; Academic dean

Mary Winnifred Kydd, CBE (died 1969), was a Canadian first-wave feminist, academic dean, and disarmament activist in the years leading up to World War II. Kydd was the President of the Montreal Council of Women, and then the National Council of Women of Canada. In that position, she was one of five women to be chosen as an official delegate to the League of Nations World Disarmament Conference. She was also the Dean of Women at Queen's University from 1934 until 1939. She was prominent in the leadership of the Girl Guides, and in addition to serving as the Chief Commissioner of the Girl Guides of Canada, she was the first Canadian to serve as Director of the World Association of Girl Guides and Girl Scouts.

== Early life and education ==
Kydd attended the Trafalgar School for Girls in Montreal, Canada, starting her studies there in 1910 and graduating in 1919. Kydd then completed a BA degree at McGill University in 1923, and went on to also graduate with an M.A. degree with honours in economics and political science. While in Montreal, Kydd was involved in social work.

After completing her M.A. degree Kydd won the Julius C. Strawbridge Fellowship to attend Bryn Mawr College, where she spent two years. Her academic studies focused on the status of women in Europe.

== Career ==
Kydd was the President of the Montreal Council of Women from 1929 until 1931. In 1931, Kydd became the President of the National Council of Women of Canada, and she remained in that position until 1936. One particularly notable position during her tenure was the organization's neutral stance on birth control.

In the leadup to World War II, Kydd was involved in disarmament activities. For example, as president of the National Council of Women of Canada Kydd was a featured speaker at a disarmament rally at Central Hall, Westminster in May 1934. Kydd was also an official delegate to multiple large international pre-war conferences related to international affairs. In 1932, she was appointed by Canadian Prime Minister R. B. Bennett to be a delegate to the World Disarmament Conference. Kydd was one of just five women to be delegated to that conference. Kydd presented disarmament and the prevention of war as an issue that was and should be of concern to women. Kydd was also a delegate to the Institute of Pacific Relations conference in 1936.

Kydd was appointed Dean of Women at Queen's University in 1934. That year she also became president of the Canadian National Parks Association, a position she held until 1936. She would leave her position as Dean of Women at Queen's on May 6, 1939. She initially resigned intending to return to social work in Montreal, but was instead persuaded by H. A. Bruce to move to Toronto and work for the Leadership League.

Kydd was both the Chief Commissioner of the Girl Guides of Canada, as well as the Director of the World Association of Girl Guides and Girl Scouts. She was the first Canadian to direct the World Association.

Kydd died in 1969.

== Honours ==
Kydd was named a Commander of the Most Excellent Order of the British Empire (CBE). She was included in the 1934 Birthday Honours.

On the 125th anniversary of the Trafalgar School for Girls (the secondary school that Kydd attended), she was included in a celebratory list of "125 women of Trafalgar".
