= Harriet Dunlop Prenter =

Canadian women's rights leader

Harriet Irene Dunlop Prenter
- Born: 1865
- Died: 16 July 1939 (aged 73–74); Belleville, Ontario, Canada
- Occupations: Feminist, politician
- Known for: First woman candidate for Canadian federal election

Harriet Irene Dunlop Prenter (1865 or 1856 – 16 July 1939) (Note: According to Jane Addams Online, she may have been born in 1856 or 1865 (Jane Addams n.d.).) was a leader in the women's rights movement in Canada. In 1921 she was among the first group of women to run as candidates in a Canadian federal election. She was a committed socialist.

== Family ==
Harriet Irene Dunlop was the daughter of Archibald Dunlop. She belonged to the Presbyterian faith. She married Hector Henry Weir Prenter on 8 September 1892 in York, Ontario. (Note: In conformance with the custom of the time, Harriet Dunlop was sometimes called Mrs. Hector Prenter (Naylor 1991, p. 282).) Her husband was born in Ireland on 2 February 1860, and had emigrated to Canada around 1890.

== Pacifist ==
During World War I (1914–18) Harriet Dunlop Prenter took an idealist position against church ministers who supported military training in schools. She wrote, "After all, militarism is not a system: it is a spirit, and if we allow this thing now, we are denying the very principle for which our men are dying in Europe." The Women's International League for Peace and Freedom (WILPF) developed from the Women's Peace Party (WPP) that Jane Addams and other feminist pacifists had organized in January 1915. Prenter became secretary of the Canadian section of the WILPF. In the fall of 1916 Prenter informed the WILPF headquarters that Rose Henderson in Montreal had "fifty women ready to join a group".

Many feminists were opposed to pacifism. Woman's Century responded in late summer 1917 to a report that Prenter and Laura Hughes, described as "prominent suffragists", had drawn a link between suffrage and pacifism in Ontario. According to the editor, Jessie Campbell MacIver, "National Union and Ontario Equal Franchise Association have again and again expressed themselves as repudiating utterly any question of premature peace. Any pacifist literature which has been received from the Hague and elsewhere has been consigned by these societies to the waste-paper basket."

== Feminist ==
Prenter was an outspoken supporter of women's suffrage. She was president of the Political Equality League in Toronto. In late 1918 Prenter and Lucy MacGregor of the Women's Social Democratic League formed a Women's Labor League (WLL) in Toronto. The WLL was a working-class organization. Prenter mocked the "silken dames ... so occupied with 'committees' and 'uplifting' that they allow the social revolution to walk right past them." Prenter wrote regularly for Canadian Forward, which reported on labour and socialist topics and published feminist and pacifist material for about 30,000 readers. Her articles also appeared in the White Ribbon Bulletin and Woman's Century. She may have encouraged Gertrude Richardson to contribute to Canadian Forward from June 1917 onward. In 1920 Prenter started a women's page in the Industrial Banner. She made it clear that she would not "endlessly discuss cooking, children, church and clothes." The column would be concerned with topics such as the money value of the work a woman does in the home, and whether she should be paid a wage.

== Socialist ==
At first a member of the Liberal Party of Canada, Prenter became a socialist and joined the Independent Labour Party. She ran as a candidate in the 1921 Federal election, one of the first women to run as candidates in a Canadian federal election. (Note: Other than Prenter, who ran on a Labour platform, the women who ran for election to the House of Commons of Canada in the 1921 election were Rose Mary Louise Henderson (Labour), Elixabeth Bethune Kiely (Liberal), Agnes Macphail (Progressive) and Harriet S. Dick (Independent) (Trimble, Arscott & Tremblay 2013, p. 254).) She ran in Toronto West in December 1921, winning 1,741 votes. She was not elected. In the 1920s Prenter continued to be active in left-wing politics in the United States as well as Canada. In 1922 Prenter joined the Workers' Party of Canada (WPC), and ensured that the WLL helped the WPC with communist campaigns. In 1922 she and Janet Inman addressed two hundred women of the WPC at a public meeting in Hamilton, Ontario. In 1924, for the first time in Canada, the WLL celebrated International Women's Day.

Prenter also became involved with the Canadian Labor Party (CLP). She and other Workers' Party members such as Jack MacDonald tried to overcome the caution of the CLP members and instill a more revolutionary spirit. This communist influence was disturbing to some of the trade union delegates. At the 1927 annual convention of the CLP there was a crisis in which the party split. The non-communist Ontario Labor Party headed by Arthur Mould left the CLP.

== See also ==
- List of peace activists

== Sources ==
- Campbell, Peter (2 November 2010). Rose Henderson: A Woman for the People. McGill-Queen's Press (MQUP). ISBN 978-0-7735-3764-4.
- Forestell, Nancy M.; Moynagh, Maureen (1 April 2013). Documenting First Wave Feminisms: Volume II Canada – National and Transnational Contexts. University of Toronto Press. ISBN 978-0-8020-9414-8.
- "Harriett Irene Dunlop". Ancestry.ca.
- Howard, Irene (1 October 1992). The Struggle for Social Justice in British Columbia: Helena Gutteridge, the Unknown Reformer. UBC Press. ISBN 978-0-7748-0425-7.
- "Marriage Records for Hector Prenter and Harriett Dunlop". Ancestry.ca.
- McLaughlin, Robert (2013). Irish Canadian Conflict and the Struggle for Irish Independence, 1912–1925. University of Toronto Press. ISBN 978-1-4426-1097-2.
- Naylor, James (1 January 1991). The New Democracy: Challenging the Social Order in Industrial Ontario, 1914–1925. University of Toronto Press. p. 20. ISBN 978-0-8020-6886-6 – via Internet Archive.
- "Prenter, Harriet Irene Dunlop (1865-1939)". Jane Addams Digital Edition. n.d.
- Roberts, Barbara (18 June 1996). Reconstructed World: A Feminist Biography of Gertrude Richardson. McGill-Queen's Press (MQUP). ISBN 978-0-7735-6592-0.
- Sayers, A.M. (2017). "Harriet Dunlop Prenter". Canadian Elections Database.
- Trimble, Linda; Arscott, Jane; Tremblay, Manon (31 May 2013). Stalled: The Representation of Women in Canadian Governments. UBC Press. ISBN 978-0-7748-2522-1.
