= Alice Mary Hagen =

Canadian ceramic artist

- Egan in her younger years
- Born: Alice Mary Egan; 1872; Halifax, Nova Scotia, Canada
- Died: January 1972 (aged 99–100); Nova Scotia, Canada
- Other name: Alice Egan Hagen
- Occupations: China painter, potter
- Known for: The Christina Morris bowl

Alice Mary Hagen (née Egan; (Note: Alice Egan already had a recognized name as a professional china painter before her marriage. After she married she began to sign her work "Alice M. Hagen". Earlier works discussing the artist refer to her as "Alice Egan", while later works use "Alice Hagen".) 1872 – January 1972) was a Canadian ceramic artist from Halifax, Nova Scotia. She was trained in china painting, and earned her living through selling painted chinaware and teaching. She was among the artists selected to paint plates for the 1897 Canadian Historical Dinner Service. She gained a high reputation for the quality of her work, for which she won various prizes. She married happily and had two daughters. She continued to paint china while raising her family in Canada and Jamaica. When she was about sixty and her husband had retired she learned to make pottery at her studio in Nova Scotia, and was a pioneer of studio pottery in the area. She continued to produce and sell painted pottery until she was aged 93. Many ceramic artists acknowledged their debt to Alice Hagen as a teacher and an example.

== Early years ==
Alice Mary Egan was born in Halifax, Nova Scotia, in 1872. Her parents were Lieutenant-Colonel Thomas J. Egan and Margaret Kelley. Her father owned a store that sold guns and sporting goods in downtown Halifax, and by the early 20th century was also offering taxidermy services. He was a prominent member of the Irish Catholic community of the city, a founding member of the Halifax Rifles militia unit and the author of the History of the Halifax Volunteer Battalion and Volunteer Companies 1859-1887. She had two sisters and one brother.

Alice's mother was an amateur artist of some ability, and encouraged Alice to draw and paint. She determined to become a professional artist, against her parents' wishes. Her father thought that millinery would be a more secure source of income than art, even though pay was low, but Alice was determined. Alice Egan first studied art at the Mount Saint Vincent Academy, Halifax. She then studied at the Victoria School of Art and Design, which later became the Nova Scotia College of Art. She also studied at the Osgood Art School in New York.

== China painter ==
Around 1892 an artist named Bessie Brown taught Alice Egan basic china painting techniques. Bessie Brown was the sister-in-law of John Thompson, prime minister of Canada. China painting was a popular medium at that time for professional women artists. It was one of the few respectable media for women artists, perhaps due to its associations with decorating the home. She went on to study china painting under Adelaïde Alsop Robineau in New York in 1896. Alice Egan leased a studio in Halifax in the commercial Roy Building. She equipped it with a kiln, purchased from the profits from her early sales, and used the studio to paint and to teach. Photographs show that she took care to give the room and feminine and domestic feeling despite its commercial purpose.

In 1896 the Woman's Art Association of Canada decided to commission a state dinner service to be painted on china by members of the association. Mary Dignam supervised the work of Alice Egan and twelve other Ontario and Quebec artists. These included Lily Osman Adams (1865–1945) and Phoebe Amelia Watson (1858–1947). The dinner service for eight courses with 24 place settings was to commemorate the 400th anniversary in 1897 of John Cabot's discovery of Canada. Alice Egan was chosen to paint twelve of the game plates. Her father was a hunter, and she used his Audubon books as guides for her illustrations. Each of these plates is painted on bone china blanks from Doulton & Co. of Burslem, Staffordshire, England, and depicts a different Canadian game bird. The finished product was well received. In 1898 the "Canadian Historical Dinner Service" was purchased by private subscriptions from members of the Senate and House of Commons of Canada, and on 13 June 1898 was formally presented to Lady Aberdeen by the Senate of Canada after the end of the term of her husband as Governor General.

Alice Egan taught china painting at her studio in 1898–99. She was an instructor in china painting in the Victoria School of Art & Design in 1899-1900. She was particularly adept in lustre, an overglaze colorant fired at low temperatures. All the lustre seems brown when it is painted on the piece, but the colors emerge during firing. Sometimes Hagen would paint and fire several layer in succession. She used published pictures and designs for the images and motifs on her work, and sometimes drew from nature. The images were in a broad range of styles including naturalist, figurative, Asian and Art Nouveau.

In 1901 Alice married John Hagen of the Halifax and Bermudas Cable Company. They had two daughters, Rachel, born 1902, and Kathleen, born 1905. In 1910 John Hagen was transferred to Jamaica. Alice Hagen worked and taught in Jamaica, and her work was widely exhibited in the Caribbean islands. She sold her work and donated the proceeds to the Red Cross. She was the first woman to be awarded the bronze Musgrave Medal for her contribution to art in Jamaica, and the first woman to be awarded the silver medal. The Hagens returned to Halifax in 1916. Soon after she held an exhibition at the Women's Art Association Studio in Toronto. Alice Hagen continued to paint china, to teach and to exhibit in Halifax and Toronto. Her students were often school teachers and nuns.

== Potter ==
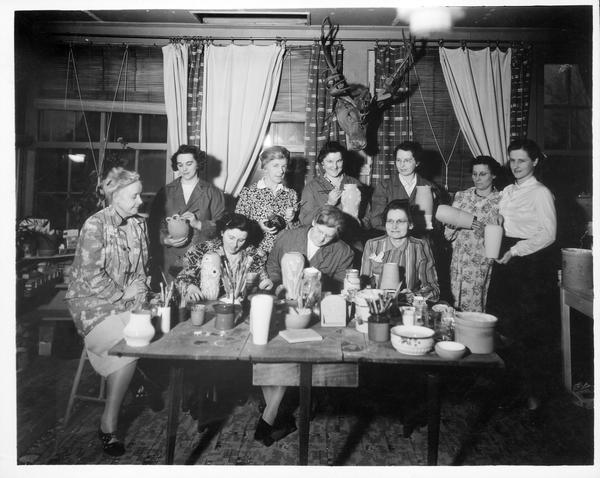
Hagen seated with pottery class students in Mahone Bay

In 1930 John Hagen retired from the Halifax and Bermuda Cable Company. The Hagens went on a tour of Europe, and Alice visited leading china manufacturers in England, France and Italy. In London she saw early Near Eastern lustre wares in a Persian Art Exhibit. In France she became interested in making pottery when she visited a pottery staffed by war veterans and saw how absorbed they were in their work. In retirement, John Hagen was very supportive of his wife, and would do the cooking to give her time for her work.

After returning in 1931 Alice studied pottery under Charles Prescott, who owned a small industrial pottery in Fairview, Nova Scotia. She obtained a kiln and made a studio in her home. When Alice Hagen began working in clay in 1931 the craft revival was already underway elsewhere, but in Nova Scotia she was a pioneer of studio pottery. In 1932 the Hagens moved to Mahone Bay, Nova Scotia. Alice Hagen launching into a new career as a potter. She exhibited her work and won various awards. She also taught a summer school for the Department of Education until around 1950.

A pioneer artist potter, she experimented with local clays and glazes, and with clays from other parts of Canada. She developed a form of agateware using clays stained green, white and blue, which she called "Scotian Pebble". She continue to experiment until she was aged 93. According to Homer Lord, who worked with her for a month and a half in the summer of 1949, she was a very strong china painter but not a strong potter. Her main interest in pottery was decoration of the surfaces, so she often cast rather than threw her pots. The journalist Kay Hill visited Hagen in 1959 for an interview for the Atlantic Advocate. She said of the house,

Oil paintings covered most of the wall space. Casually disposed on ceramic tile tables stood vases and priceless lustre. Chinaware and decorated glass spilled out of cupboards and china cabinets, or stood carelessly on the floor ... She mixes her cakes in a gorgeous punch bowl hand painted in enamel overglaze. Every room upstairs is hung with oils, too, including the bathroom!

John Hagen died in 1964. Alice Mary Hagen died in January 1972. The Nova Scotia government received forty-eight pieces of her handpainted china, glass and pottery, which are on display at the Citadel Museum in Halifax. In 1966 she gave the Mount Saint Vincent Academy many of her works of pottery and painted china. Her work is held by the Nova Scotia Museum, the Art Gallery of Nova Scotia, the Mahone Bay Museum, and Rideau Hall, Ottawa.
