= Phoebe Amelia Watson =

Canadian painter and curator

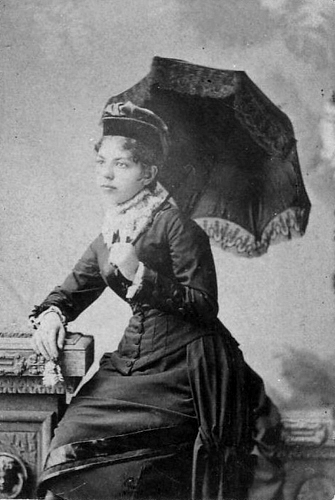
- Phoebe Amelia Watson in 1885
- Born: 1 June 1858; Doon, Kitchener, Ontario, Canada
- Died: 22 October 1947 (aged 89); Kitchener, Ontario, Canada
- Occupation: Painter

Phoebe Amelia Watson (1 June 1858 – 22 October 1947) was a Canadian painter and curator. She worked in painted ceramics, watercolor and oils. She was the sister of Homer Watson, the well-known landscape artist, and devoted much of her life to promoting her brother's work, including her role as the curator of the Homer Watson Art Gallery at Doon.

== Life ==
Phoebe Amelia Watson was born on 1 June 1858 in the village of Doon, now part of the city of Kitchener, Ontario (the area was then in Canada West). Her parents, Ransford Watson (1824–1861) and Susannah Mohr, had married on 3 October 1852. They owned a mill. Phoebe Amelia Watson belonged to the Christadelphians.

Her brother was Homer Watson (1855–1936), who became a celebrated artist. She left school while she was in her teens to help support her widowed mother and her siblings so her brother could devote himself to his art. It was said that "Miss Watson throughout her life has preferred rather than to put forward her own undoubted attainments, to base her chief claim to fame on her relationship with the painter of Doon, who from her childhood days loomed on her horizon a genius."

Watson painted china, and also painted landscapes and portraits in watercolor and oil. In 1896, the Women's Art Association of Canada (WAAC) decided to commission a Canadian State Dinner Service to be painted on china by members of the association. The chosen artists included Watson, Lily Osman Adams (1865–1945) and Alice Egan. Watson painted twelve of the soup plates. Among Watson's portraits are six of mayors of Waterloo, Ontario, and two of Queen Victoria. Her work was exhibited by the Ontario Society of Artists and the Women's Art Association of Canada.

Watson moved into her brother Homer's house after his wife Roxanna died in 1918. She became a curator of the Homer Watson Art Gallery in Doon, and held this post until her death on 22 October 1947. She never married. She was buried in the Kinzie Cemetery, Kitchener.

As of 2004, the Homer Watson house was an art school and a small gallery with four rooms that feature the work of Homer Watson and other artists.

== Sources ==
- "Homer Watson 1855 – 1936". Homer Watson House & Gallery. Archived from the original on 29 July 2014.
- "Homer Watson House and Gallery". An Insider's Guide to Waterloo Region.
- Lerner, Loren R.; Williamson, Mary F. (1 January 1991). Art and Architecture in Canada: A Bibliography and Guide to the Literature. University of Toronto Press. ISBN 978-0-8020-5856-0.
- "Phoebe Amelia Watson". Canadian Museum of History.
- "Phoebe Amelia Watson". Waterloo Region Generations. 2014.
- Russell, Ruth Weber (2000). Women of Waterloo County. Natural Heritage/Natural History, Incorporated. ISBN 978-1-896219-72-1.
- "The Artists". Canadian Museum of History.
