= McGeoch =

McGeoch is a surname. Notable people with the surname include:

- Alex McGeoch (1854–1922), Scottish footballer
- Catherine McGeoch, American computer scientist
- Charles McGeoch (1899–1985), American football coach
- Ian McGeoch (1914–2007), British Royal Navy officer
- John McGeoch (1955–2004), Scottish guitarist
- John Alexander McGeoch (1897–1942), American psychologist and educator
- Lillian McGeoch (1903–1992), Canadian painter and sculptor
