= Marion Bryce =

- Born: Marion Samuel; February 18, 1839; Kirkliston, West Lothian, Scotland
- Died: October 1920 (aged 81); Winnipeg, Canada
- Occupations: educator; community leader

Marion Bryce (née Samuel; 1839–1920) was a Scottish-born Canadian educator and community leader prominent in religious, education, and philanthropic activities in Winnipeg.

== Early life and education ==
Marion Samuel was born in Kirkliston, West Lothian, Scotland, a few miles from Edinburgh on a farm beside Niddry Castle, on February 18, 1839. For a few years, she lived with her family in Newry, Northern Ireland.

She was educated privately.

== Career ==
Bryce emigrated to Toronto where she served as head mistress of Mrs. Birnie's Ladies School. Later, she joined the staff of Manitoba College as lecturer in French and German.

Bryce was identified with the earliest philanthropic activities of Winnipeg. She was one of the founders of the Christian Women's Union of Winnipeg (CWU), which took charge of the first maternity hospital and later established the Women's Home. She was the first president of the CWU; president, Old Folks Home, Middlechurch, Manitoba, 1911; secretary-treasurer, Knox Church Ladies Aid, for 20 years; first president, Presbyterian Women's Union; president, Victorian Order of Nurses; and president (succeeding Lady Taylor), National Council of Women, Winnipeg. She was also president of the McAll Mission, president of the Women's Missionary association, and an honorary member of Knox societies.

Bryce read many papers before historical and scientific societies, and was a Fellow of the Royal Society of Canada.

== Personal life ==
She married Dr. George Bryce in Toronto in 1873, (Note: According to Marion's obituary in the Free Press Prairie Farmer, the couple married in 1872.) and then came to Winnipeg.

She traveled much in Europe and in the United States and often visited her native Scotland.

She made her home in Kilmadock, Manitoba. The couple spent the last two winters of Bryce's life in Victoria, British Columbia.

After having been ill for some months, Marion Bryce died in Winnipeg in October 1920, due to hardening of the arteries. She was buried in Kildonan beside the grave of her son, George Norman, who died in infancy.

== Selected works ==
- "Historical Sketch of the Charitable Institutions of Winnipeg", Manitoba Historical Society, Transactions, Series 1, No. 54, read 21 February 1899, Winnipeg: Manitoba Free Press.
- Early Red River Culture (Winnipeg: Manitoba Free Press, 1901.) Transaction, No. 57.
