= Matilda Ridout Edgar =

Canadian historian (1844–1910)

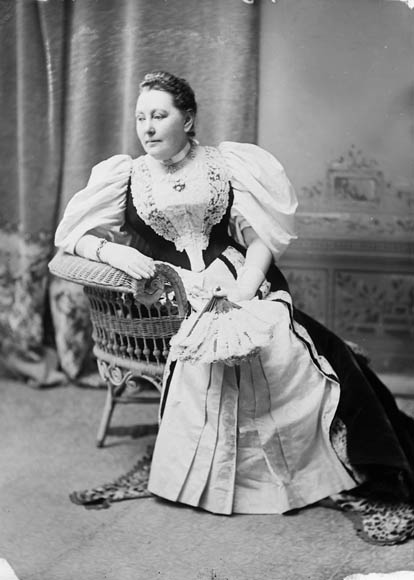
- Matilda Edgar in October 1896
- Born: Matilda Ridout; 29 September 1844; Toronto, Canada West
- Died: 29 September 1910 (aged 66); London, England
- Occupations: Historian and feminist
- Known for: Ten years of Upper Canada in peace and war, 1805–1815

Matilda Ridout Edgar (29 September 1844 – 29 September 1910) was a Canadian historian and feminist. She was born Matilda Ridout, became Matilda Edgar by marriage, and became Lady Edgar in 1898 when her husband was knighted. The mother of nine children, she turned to historical research and writing when in her forties. She published three books in her lifetime and was working on a fourth when she died. She was active in a number of Toronto-based societies and in her later years was a strong advocate of women's causes.

== Early years ==
Matilda Ridout was born in Toronto, Province of Canada, on 29 September 1844, the fifth child and second daughter of Thomas Gibbs Ridout and Matilda Ann Bramley. Her grandfather, Thomas Ridout of Sherborne, Dorset, was surveyor general of Upper Canada from 1810 to 1829. Her father was the first cashier of the Bank of Upper Canada from 1822 until he retired in 1861. Her father died a few months after retiring, and his mother was left with little money to support a family of nine. On 5 September 1865 Matilda married James David Edgar, a barrister, lawyer and author, becoming Matilda Edgar. The marriage of "Tillie" (Matilda) and James was happy and loving, as is shown by the letters he wrote to her daily when politics took him to Ottawa.

She enjoyed raising their three daughters and six sons, although they left her with little free time. Eight of the children lived into adulthood. Their eldest son was James Frederic Edgar, born on 6 July 1866. Their second surviving son was Pelham Edgar and their oldest daughter was Maud. They were followed by William Wilkie, born on 26 October 1874, Beatrice on 25 August 1877, David Keithock on 29 November 1879 and Herbert Wedderlie on 20 June 1883. Marjorie was born in 1886.

Her husband ran on the Liberal platform and was elected to the House of Commons of Canada to represent Monck, Ontario on 12 October 1872, but lost his seat in the election of 22 January 1874. He ran again without success in several by-elections and elections until being elected on the Liberal platform for Ontario West on 22 August 1884. During his time out of office he became the unofficial organizer for Prime Minister Alexander Mackenzie in Ontario, and negotiated a new railway clause for the entry of British Columbia into the Confederation of Canada.

== Philanthropist ==
James David Edgar was appointed Speaker of the House of Commons on 19 August 1896, holding this position until his death. As his wife, Matilda Edgar was invited to become patron of enterprises such as the Toronto Infants' Home, the Imperial Order Daughters of the Empire, and the Women's Art Association of Canada (WAAC) In 1898 Matilda Edgar and Mary Dignam, president of the WAAC, arranged for members of the House and Senate to subscribe $1,000 to purchase the Cabot Commemorative State Dinner Service. This was a hand-painted eight-course, 24-place dinner set representing Canadian subjects that had been made by WAAC members to commemorate the 400th anniversary of John Cabot's discovery of Canada. The set was formally presented to Lady Aberdeen on the occasion of her husband finishing his assignment as Governor General of Canada.

Prime Minister Sir Wilfrid Laurier appointed Edgar to the Privy Council, and in 1898 he was knighted. He was already showing the symptoms of nephritis, a kidney disease. For part of 1898 Matilda, now Lady Edgar, was acting president of the National Council of Women of Canada. When her husband died on 31 July 1899, Matilda Edgar was devastated, and gave up all public activities for the next year. She briefly turned to spiritualism, and thought she received a message from her husband telling her to continue to work and to give her support to the children.

Matilda Edgar became active in public again in 1900. She threw herself into women's causes, proposing that women should have the right to receive higher education, support themselves, vote, and not lose control of their property when they married. She became a life member of the National Council of Women in 1906, and was elected president of the council that year. She was elected president again in 1909.

== Historian ==
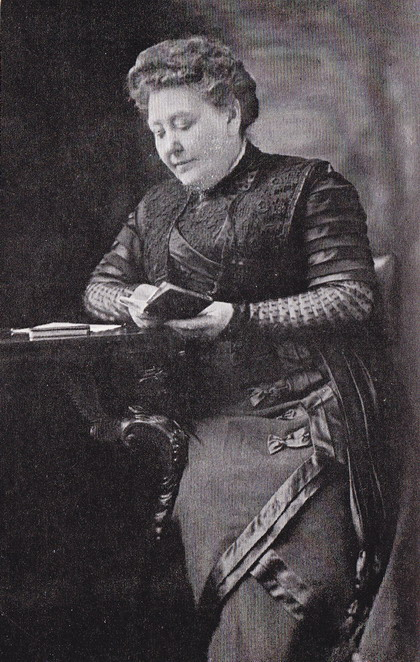
Image of Lady Edgar from the Women’s Canadian Historical Society of Toronto Transaction No 8 (1914)

In 1890 Matilda Edgar published an edited collection of letters between her grandfather and his sons George and Thomas. They described life in Toronto and London and the battles of the War of 1812. The work celebrated the achievements of Canada in an effort to build national pride, and was well received. A sketch of her life published by the Women's Canadian Historical Society in 1914 said, "The resultant volume ... revealed her sense of historical perspective, her easy mastery of detail, and her possession of a literary style that was at once limpid, nervous and strong".

Matilda Edgar and Sarah Anne Curzon founded the Canadian Women's Historical Society in 1895. She replaced Curzon as president of the Society in 1897, when Curzon retired. In 1904 she published a biography of Sir Isaac Brock, another "whig" celebration of Canadian achievement. The Montreal Standard said of this book that "for accuracy and completeness of information…and for beauty of style, it has seldom been surpassed." Her third book also drew on the Ridout family papers. It was a biography of Horatio Sharpe, a colonial governor of Maryland. The book was published in 1912, after her death, and was highly praised.

Matilda Edgar began work on a biography of an ancestor of her husband, James Edgar, a Scottish Jacobite. For more than forty years he was private secretary to James Francis Edward Stuart, the Chevalier St. George. She was given permission to conduct research at Windsor Castle, where his correspondence was preserved, and spent the winter of 1909–10 working in the library. The book was complete apart from the last three chapters when she went back to London to conduct some research in the British Museum. She died of heart failure in London, England, on 29 September 1910. Her body was taken back to Toronto for burial.

James Frederic Edgar served in the Second Riel Rebellion, then completed his legal studies and was called to the bar of Ontario. He was eventually created a King's Counsel. Pelham Edgar became an English professor at Victoria College in the University of Toronto. Maud co-founded Miss Edgar's and Miss Cramp's School in Montreal, and for many years was headmistress of this private school for girls. Marjorie married Keith Hicks. Their daughter Maud McLean co-authored a biography of Matilda and her husband, published in 1988.

== Bibliography ==
Matilda Edgar's published works were:

- Matilda Ridout Edgar (1890). Ten years of Upper Canada in peace and war, 1805–1815. Toronto: William Briggs.
- Matilda Ridout Edgar (1899). "Sketch of Mrs. Curzon's life and work". Transactions. 2. Women's Canadian Historical Society of Toronto: 3–4.
- Matilda Ridout Edgar (1904). Duncan Campbell Scott; Oscar Pelham Edgar (eds.). General Brock. Makers of Canada. (biography). Toronto: George Nathaniel Morang.
- Matilda Ridout Edgar (1912). A colonial governor in Maryland; Horatio Sharpe and his times, 1753–1773. (published posthumously). London.

== Sources ==
- Bird, Kim (2007). "Sarah Anne Curzon". The Canadian Encyclopedia. Historica Canada.
- Breault, Erin (2014). "RIDOUT, MATILDA". Dictionary of Canadian Biography. Vol. 13. University of Toronto/Université Laval.
- "EDGAR, The Hon. Sir James David, P.C., Q.C." Parliament of Canada.
- Elwood, Marie (Spring 1977). "The State Dinner Service of Canada, 1898" (PDF). Material History Bulletin. Ottawa: National Museum of Man.
- Holmlund, Mona; Youngberg, Gail (2003). "Matilda Ridout Edgar, Lady Edgar". Inspiring Women: A Celebration of Herstory. Coteau Books. ISBN 978-1-55050-204-6.
- "Hon. Sir James David Edgar". Parliament of Canada.
- "James Frederick Edgar". Ancestry.com.
- "James Frederic Edgar". Archives Canada. Archived from the original on 15 July 2014.
- McLean, Maud J.; Stamp, Robert (15 August 1998). My Dearest Wife: The Private and Public Lives of James David Edgar and Matilda Ridout Edgar. Dundurn. ISBN 978-1-55488-235-9.
- Plummer, Kevin (25 September 2010). "Historicist: "Amateur Historians" and "Housewives"". Torontoist.
- "Sketch of Lady Edgar's Life". Transaction No. 8. Women's Canadian Historical Society. 1914.
