= McGeough =

McGeough is a surname. Notable people with the surname include:

- Gerry McGeough (born 1958), Irish republican
- Jim McGeough (born 1963), Canadian ice hockey
- Jimmy McGeough (born 1944), Northern Irish footballer and manager
- Jimmy McGeough, Jr., American soccer player
- Joseph McGeough (born 1940), Scottish engineer and academic
- Joseph McGeough (nuncio) (1903–1970), American archbishop, Vatican diplomat
- Mick McGeough (1956–2018), Canadian ice hockey referee
- Paul McGeough, Australian journalist
- Dan McGeough, (Born 2008) Professional e-sports player
