= Mary Dignam =

Canadian painter (1857–1938)

Mary Ella Dignam
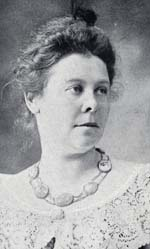
- Mary Dignam in 1903
- Born: Mary Ella Williams; 13 January 1857; Port Burwell, Canada West
- Died: September 6, 1938 (aged 81); Toronto, Canada
- Known for: Painter

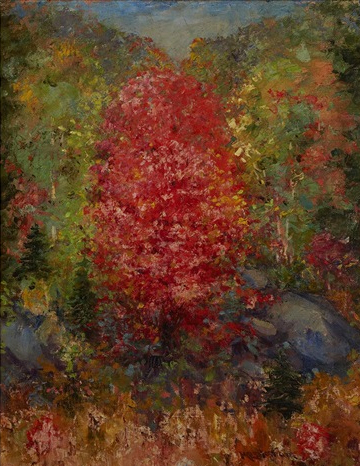
Red Maple by Mary Dignam

Mary Ella Dignam (Born Mary Ella Williams; 1857–1938) was a Canadian painter, teacher, and art organizer best remembered as the founder and first president of the Women's Art Association of Canada (WAAC).

== Life ==
Mary Ella Williams was born in Port Burwell, Canada West, on 13 January 1857. She studied art at the Western School of Art and Design in London, Ontario. In 1886 she went to New York City to further her training at the Art Students League, followed by time in Paris, France, at the artist's workshop run by Raphaël Collin (1850–1916) and Luc-Olivier Merson (1846–1920).

In 1886, Dignam founded the Women's Art Club, which later evolved into the WAAC. During her presidency (1887–1913, 1935–1938), Dignam was the driving force behind production of the Cabot Commemorative State Dinner Service. This was a hand-painted eight-course, 24-place dinner set representing Canadian subjects that had been made by WAAC members to commemorate the 400th anniversary of John Cabot's discovery of Canada.

Following her return to Canada in 1891, she taught at a ladies' art school in Toronto, Ontario and later organized the first Art Studios of Moulton Ladies' College at McMaster University. In 1898, Dignam and Lady Edgar, wife of the Speaker of the House of Commons, arranged for members of the House and Senate to subscribe $1,000 to purchase the service, which was formally presented to Lady Aberdeen on the occasion of her husband finishing his assignment as Governor General of Canada. She later helped organize the International Society of Women Painters and Sculptors and in 1900, founded the first all-women international art exhibition calling on Women's Art Association members & Women's International Art.

Dignam was a member of the Art Association of Montreal (1886–1931), the Ontario Society of Artists (1883–1912), the Royal Canadian Academy of Arts (1883–1924), and the Toronto Industrial Exhibition (1891–1900). She was also a member of the New Society of Artists in London. Her works were exhibited across Canada and New York, London, and Paris. Dignam exhibited her work at the Palace of Fine Arts at the 1893 World's Columbian Exposition in Chicago, Illinois.

== Death ==
She died 6 September 1938 in Toronto, Ontario.
