= Thomas J. Egan =

Welsh-Canadian merchant, gunsmith, taxidermist, and naturalist

- Born: Thomas James Egan; 1842; Wales, United Kingdom
- Died: 11 April 1914 (aged 71–72); Halifax, Nova Scotia, Canada
- Other name: T.J. Egan
- Occupations: Merchant; Gunsmith; Taxidermist
- Father: John Egan
- Relatives: Alice Mary Hagen (daughter)

Thomas James Egan (1842 – 11 April 1914) was a Welsh-Canadian merchant, gunsmith, taxidermist, and naturalist.

== Early life ==
Thomas James Egan was born around 1842 in Wales, United Kingdom.

His father, John Egan, established himself as a gunsmith in the city of Halifax, Nova Scotia in the late 1840s.

== Career ==
Enlisting on 10 January 1860, Thomas J. Egan became part of the Halifax Rifles, one of six companies to form the Halifax Volunteer Battalion. Private Egan represented the Halifax Rifles in shooting competitions held by the Nova Scotia Rifle Association. Pte. Egan and Corp. Brennan were selected to represent the Halifax Rifles at the first provincial rifle match in Windsor, Nova Scotia, on 1 October 1861. That same month, Privates Egan and M. Neville represented the unit at the New Brunswick rifle match in Sussex. He was promoted to corporal in May 1862.

As early as 1876, T.J. Egan ran a shop at 177 Lower Water St., near the Halifax Hotel, specializing in firearms, ammunition, and taxidermy services. Birds and animals were stuffed for sale, with specimens put on display. His firm also sold fishing tackle and sporting goods.

The Nova Scotia taxidermist participated as a member of the Canadian delegation at the 1876 Centennial Exposition in Philadelphia. He earned a bronze medal for his land animal exhibit, which featured six glass cases of Canadian birds, a caribou, two caribou heads, two moose heads, and a black bear.

In February 1878, he attended the Nova Scotia Poultry and Floricultural Association's exhibition in Halifax, winning first prize for his Rouen duck display.

Prior to 1880, he had partnered with Edward William Myers as stock brokers in London at 78 Old Broad Street. The partnership officially dissolved on 28 June 1880 by mutual consent, with Myers intending to continue the business alone.

Egan advanced to captain on 21 August 1880, assuming command of the 63rd Halifax Battalion of Rifles. He was appointed Major by general order on 20 July 1883. That October, his former company honored him with a field officer's regulation bridle recognizing his promotion.

He began dog breeding in Halifax by the early 1880s and obtained a red Irish Setter. He also purchased a Clumber Spaniel that was brought to Nova Scotia, winning several prizes with it and breeding multiple litters with different dogs. At a dog show in Saint John, New Brunswick on 17 January 1884, he entered one category with Irish setters and another with Clumber spaniels. Awarded "Best Clumber Spaniel," he received a silver cup donated by Charles Burpee. That night, a prized Irish setter broke its chain and fled the show grounds, with a reward offered for its return.

Thomas J. Egan played a key role alongside Halifax taxidermist Andrew Downs in preparing the Dominion of Canada's taxidermy display for the 1883 International Fisheries Exhibition in London. He spent $248 on specimen procurement. Egan's preparation was showcased in the exhibit, featuring five large cases of fish-destroying birds, including ducks, two eagles soaring above two fish-hawks guarding a nest with eggs, loons with young and eggs, cranes—including a rare white crane—shore birds, bitterns, kingfishers, and other species.

In the fall of 1888, Maj. Egan published "History of the Halifax Volunteer Battalion and Volunteer Companies: 1859-1887". The work covered the formation of the local battalion and volunteer companies raised in Nova Scotia.

By the mid-to-late 1880s and early 1890s, he was active in Nova Scotia as a naturalist. He recorded the first red crossbill's nest and eggs in the province on 30 March 1889. His findings were detailed in "Netting of the American Crossbill," an article featured in The Ornithologist and Oölogist, edited by Frank Blake Webster. In 1889, the taxidermist mounted an ivory gull. The Nova Scotian Institute of Science admitted him as an ordinary member on 6 January 1890. He mounted two holboell's grebes between 1891 and 1894. By 1893, he had acquired 20 red phalarope and 12 northern phalarope. He mounted a pair of king eiders in Nova Scotia and donated them to the American Museum of Natural History in 1898. In the following year, he corresponded with Canadian zoologist Hubert Lyman Clark on the study of ptarmigans. The first adult wild whistling swan ever found in Canada was purchased and mounted by T.J. Egan in 1900 for his native bird collection. The collection was selected by the Dominion exhibition commission for the 1900 Paris Exhibition.

Attempting to enter politics in 1901, Egan ran for alderman in Halifax's Ward 2 and lost to Thomas J. Berry in the April 24 civil election.

He continued to run his sporting goods business successfully. One of his 1902 ads in the Halifax Herald boasted "the largest stock of shotguns, rifles, shot cartridges, and ammunition in the province." His inventory featured English, Belgian, and American guns, and ammunition from Kynoch, Curtis and Harvey (England), Winchester Repeating Arms Company, Union Metallic Cartridge Company (U.S.), and Dominion Cartridge Company (Canada). In 1904, the building housing his shop on Lower Water Street caught fire, resulting in its destruction. Most of the stock on the first floor was saved by Egan, but losses still totaled $13,000. Displayed in glass cases on the second floor, his bird collection with every known species in the Dominion was destroyed by fire and water.

He was serving as the treasurer of the Charitable Irish Society of Halifax before his death.

== Personal life ==
He was married to Margaret Theresa (née Kelly) Egan. Their children included a son, James J. Egan, and three daughters. His daughter, Canadian ceramic artist Alice Mary Hagen, was born in Halifax in 1872. He had a daughter named Jean Grant Egan, who in 1900 married Daniel Chisholm of Sheet Harbor. Egan and his son-in-law Daniel Chisholm later purchased a property called Rockwood Cottage on the North West Arm in Nova Scotia.

By 1882, he was a shareholder of Merchants' Bank of Halifax (now Royal Bank of Canada) and held five shares valued at $500. In 1911, he held 38 shares worth $3,800.

== Death ==
Thomas James Egan died at 72 on 11 April 1914 in Halifax, Nova Scotia, Canada. He had suffered from a 6-week battle with pleuropneumonia and pulmonary edema. His body was later interred at Mount Olivet Cemetery.

== Works ==
- History of the Halifax Volunteer Battalion and Volunteer Companies: 1859-1887 (1888)
