= Lillian McGeoch =

Canadian painter and sculptor (1903–1992)

Lillian Jean McGeoch
- Born: Lillian Jean McKittrick; 17 January 1903; Sundridge, Ontario, Canada
- Died: 1992 (aged 88–89)
- Occupations: Painter, sculptor
- Known for: Landscape, still life

Lillian Jean McGeoch (born Lillian Jean McKittrick; 17 January 1903 – 1992) was a Canadian painter and sculptor.

== Biography ==
Lillian Jean McKittrick was born in Sundridge, Ontario on 17 January 1903. Her parents were Edward James McKittrick and Ida Caroline Curran. E. J. McKittrick was an Algoma clergyman. McKittrick studied under John William Beatty and George Agnew Reid at the OCAD University. She also studied art at the Port Hope summer school, and with groups of artists in Toronto, Nova Scotia and Rockport, Maine. She won two scholarships in succession while studying under Alfred Howell (1889–1978) at the Toronto Central Technical School.

On 24 April 1926, McKittrick married Rae McGeoch, a sales manager in Toronto. She worked as a freelance commercial artist and taught art. She mainly painted oil and tempera landscapes and still life studies. She also worked with metal, clay and wood. McGeoch had solo exhibitions in Halifax, Nova Scotia (1950), the Toronto Lyceum Club (1957), the Women’s Art Association, Toronto (1961), Richview Library, Toronto (1967, 1969), Newport Hotel, Clarkson, Mississauga (1968) and the Douglas Art Gallery, Toronto.

== Sources ==
- "MCGEOCH, Lillian Jean". Canadian Women Artists History Initiative. Concordia University.
- "McGeoch, Lillian Jean". CHIN. Archived from the original on 2014-07-14.
- "Port Sydney Churchwomen Hold Art Show" (PDF). The Algoma Anglican: 3A. October 1966. Archived from the original (PDF) on 2014-07-14.
- "Toronto 1926, part 11". rootsweb.
