= National Council of Women of Canada =

Canadian non-government organization

Coordinates: 45.416376°N 75.696948°W

- The coat of arms of the NCWC
- Abbreviation: NCWC
- Formation: October 27, 1893
- Type: NGO
- Headquarters: Ottawa
- Location: Canada
- Region served: Canada
- Official language: English & French
- President: Penny Rankin
- Main organ: Board of directors
- Affiliations: International Council of Women
- Website: ncwcanada.ca

The National Council of Women of Canada (NCWC, French: Conseil national des femmes du Canada (CNFC)) is a Canadian advocacy organization based in Ottawa, Ontario, aimed at improving conditions for women, families, and communities. A federation of nationally-organized societies of men and women and local and provincial councils of women, it is the Canadian member of the International Council of Women (ICW). The Council has concerned itself in areas including women's suffrage, immigration, health care, education, mass media, the environment, and many others. Formed on October 27, 1893, in Toronto, Ontario, it is one of the oldest advocacy organizations in the country. Lady Aberdeen was elected the first president of the National Council of Women of Canada in 1893. Prominent Council leaders included Lady Gzowski, Dr. Augusta Stowe-Gullen, and Adelaide Hoodless.

== Founding ==
The International Council of Women was founded in 1888 in Washington, D.C., United States. By May 1893, the IWC World's Congress of Representative Women had met in Chicago and discussed creating a Canadian Council. The Council formally began its existence on October 27 at a public meeting at the Horticultural Pavilion of the Allan Gardens in Toronto. Over 1,500 women attended the meeting, which was chaired by Lady Aberdeen, wife of then-Governor General John Campbell Hamilton-Gordon, 7th Earl of Aberdeen. Lady Aberdeen served as the Council's first president until her resignation in 1899; she was succeeded by Lady Margaret Taylor.

== Activities ==
The Council serves an advisory role on issues based on existing organization policy. New policies are proposed as resolutions, which are developed through grassroots discussions on the local and provincial scale and are then debated and voted upon. If they are accepted, they become policies. The organization then creates briefs (formal papers based on policy), which suggest a course of action and are submitted to an official body, such as a government.

The organization has sent representatives to government boards and international bodies such as the League of Nations. The Council played a key role in creating the Victorian Order of Nurses, the Children's Aid Society, and the Consumers' Association of Canada. One of the first affiliate organizations was the Women's Art Association of Canada, of which Lady Aberdeen was the sponsor. It has also played a role in developing the Women's Bureau of Labour Canada, the Federal Bureau on Ageing, and supported the call for the Royal Commission on the Status of Women, which created the Canadian Advisory Council on the Status of Women.

The Council's major cause 1894–1918 was its fight to upgrade the status of women, without seeking the vote. It promoted a vision of "transcendent citizenship" for women. The ballot was not needed, for citizenship was to be exercised through personal influence and moral suasion, through the election of men with strong moral character, and through raising public-spirited sons. The National Council position was integrated into its nation-building program that sought to uphold Canada as a White settler nation. While the woman suffrage movement was important for extending the political rights of White women, it was also authorized through race-based arguments that linked White women's enfranchisement to the need to protect the nation from "racial degeneration."

Between 1914 and 1921 the NCWC published the monthly journal Woman's Century. The purpose was to educate women about public issues and the reforms that were needed, and to provide a forum for discussion by different women's groups. The title page described it as "A journal of education and progress for Canadian women." The monthly journal was modeled on successful British and American feminist periodicals. It was one of the very few women's rights journals published in Canada.

In 1918, the federal government granted women the right to vote in federal elections. In 1929, The Famous Five won Edwards v. Canada (Attorney General), commonly known as the "Persons case", which determined that women were "persons". Three of The Five were active members of the NCWC, and the NCWC played a vital role in winning the case.

Other causes include child welfare measures such as preventing child abuse, and encouraging education and good health care. General health measures include pasteurization, clean water, and medical inspections in schools. The Council has also fought controversial battles, such as broadening the grounds for divorce, wider availability of birth control information, removing abortion from the Criminal Code, and programs to protect and rehabilitate prostitutes.

The organization holds Consultative Status (II) with the United Nations Economic and Social Council (ECOSOC).

== Notable members ==
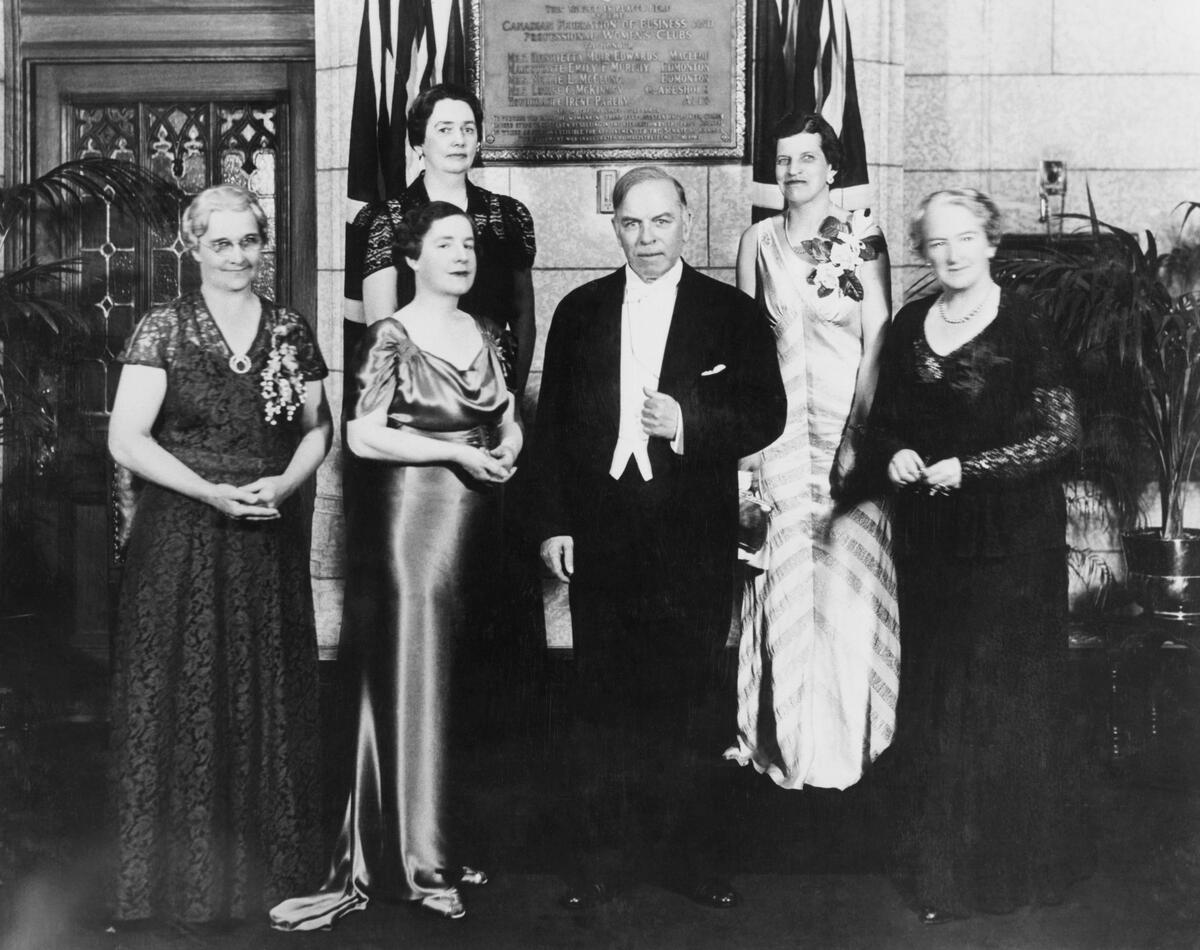
W.L. Mackenzie King unveiled a plaque from the Canadian Federation of Business and Professional Women’s Clubs honouring The Famous Five (1938, Nellie McClung at front right).

Several members of the Council have played prominent roles in Canadian history. Lady Aberdeen was instrumental in forming the Canadian branch of the National Council of Women. She had the first idea of creating the organization, despite other statements. Augusta Stowe-Gullen, one of the Society's co-founding members, was the first woman to earn a medical degree in Canada and was an important figure in the women's suffrage movement. Matilda Ridout Edgar (1844–1910), later Lady Edgar, was president in 1906 and 1909. She was an accomplished historian and an influential feminist. President Winnifred Kydd was a delegate to the League of Nations. In 1930 Cairine Wilson of the Ottawa Council became the first woman to be appointed to the Senate. Each of The Famous Five (Emily Murphy, Irene Parlby, Nellie McClung, Louise McKinney, Henrietta Edwards) were members in the organization. and also Edith Archibald led the organization for a bit in the 1880s. Nan Macpherson Smith served as president of the New Brunswick provincial organization, and represented the National Council at international meetings.

== See also ==
- Local Council of Women of Halifax
- Feminism in Canada
