= Minnie Kallmeyer =

- Born: 30 May 1882; Detroit, Michigan, USA
- Died: 22 March 1947 (aged 64); Toronto, Ontario, Canada
- Occupation: Painter

Minnie Kallmeyer (30 May 1882 – 22 March 1947) was an American-born artist who spent most of her life in Canada.

== Life ==
Minnie Kallmeyer was born on 30 May 1882 in Detroit, Michigan. She moved to Canada as a young girl. She studied under Farquhar McGillivray Knowles (1859–1932) at the Ontario School of Art in Toronto. She also took private lessons from John William Beatty (1869–1941). She went to Europe, where she studied under Walter Thor (1870-1929) in Munich and under Richard E. Miller (1875–1943) in Paris.

Kalmeyer became a well-known artist. In 1922 she joined the Ontario Society of Artists, where she exhibited her work. She died on 22 March 1947 in Toronto. She was survived by her sister Clara Kallmeyer, who was living with her in Toronto.

== Work ==
Minnie Kallmeyer was known for her oil paintings of Canadian and English scenes, including fishermen and quaint cottages. A critic writing in The Globe and Mail about an exhibition she held in 1933 at Eaton's Fine Art Galleries said, "Miss Kalmeyer knows her Canada in many localities and moods, and her work is rich in color and broad in treatment. For general home decoration, she is most happy in her medium-sized pictures, which seems to 'compose' better than the larger works, though the latter are rich in carrying power. Many of the studies in the present exhibition represent the Nova Scotian coast and fishing scenes . . . . There are sketches from Georgian Bay and England, and a flower-hung Devonshire cottage is beautiful in its simple, decorative quality." A canvas called "Hartung's Wharf, Boothbay Harbor, Maine" is held by the National Gallery of Canada.
