= Women's Art Association of Canada =

Organization founded in 1887

- Abbreviation: WAAC
- Founded: 1887; 139 years ago
- Type: Non-profit association
- Purpose: Supporting women artists
- Location(s): 23 Prince Arthur Avenue; Toronto, Ontario, Canada
- Coordinates: 43.669475°N 79.396434°W
- Website: womensartofcanada.ca

The Women's Art Association of Canada (WAAC) is an organization founded in 1887 to promote and support women artists and craftswomen in Canada, including artists in the visual media, performance artists and writers. At one time, it had almost 1,000 members. Although smaller today, it still plays an active role in fundraising and providing scholarships for young artists.

== Inception ==
In 1886 the young Canadian artist Mary Dignam (1857–1938) returned from six years in Europe, where she had supported herself by organizing art tours for young ladies in Italy and the Netherlands. She joined the staff of Miss E.K. Westmacott's Associated Artists' School of Art and Design, founded in Toronto in 1884, which taught handicrafts to women. She began to teach classes in drawing, painting and modelling in the school's studio on the 2nd floor of the Arcade building. In 1887 Dignam created a young women's artists organization which shared the premises of the handicrafts school. The organization was part of the Lyceum Club. (Note: The WAAC was closely associated with the Toronto Lyceum Club. The 1887 organization was part of the Lyceum Club. The property at #21 Prince Arthur Avenue was occupied by the Lyceum Club, next door to the WAAC house at #23. It was purchased by the WAAC in 1924. The name was retained. Emily Carr exhibited at the Lyceum Club, Toronto in 1936 and 1941. Lillian McGeoch exhibited at the Toronto Lyceum Club in 1957. The painter Charlotte Schreiber (1834–1922) had exhibited at the Toronto Lyceum Club in 1892. Her work was again exhibited at the Toronto Lyceum Club in 1967. Barker Fairley exhibited at the Lyceum Club, Women's Art Association, Toronto in 1972.) After two years, Dignam replaced Miss Westmacott as president of the school.

In 1890 Dignam incorporated the artist's organization as the Women's Art Club. It was renamed the Women's art Association of Canada in 1892. Dignam wrote later, "We had a Royal Academy branch in Toronto but I found I had to do something to open the door for women and the only way seemed to be the organization of the Women's Art Association." The association adopted the motto of the Plantin Press of Antwerp, Labore et Constantia (Labour and Constancy), the colours of red and white and the wild rose as emblem.

== Objectives ==
The goal of the association was to encourage and support Canadian women artists, including those involved in branches of fine art, applied and performance arts. According to the 1907 Bill No.30 An Act To Incorporate The Women's Art Association of Canada, "The objects of the Association shall be the creating of a general interest in art and the encouragement of women's work for the purpose of mutual help and co-operation of its members, the establishment of art lectures and reading clubs, the holding of exhibitions of painting, designs, sculpture, engraving and the industrial arts, and the encouragement and development of the art handicrafts and home industries of Canada."

In a 1917 article in Woman's Century the WAAC stated, "Service is the keynote to happiness. Every part of the Art Association's activities is based on service to the individual, to the community, and to the nation." The 1919 National Council of Women of Canada Yearbook defined the purpose of the WAAC as "to create a general interest in art, to encourage art handicrafts and home industries, and to establish art lectures and exhibitions of painting, sculpture and design." The yearbook added that "In this way it hopes to supply in some measure that great need of the artist: a public able to understand and trained to appreciate the best in art." The WAAC appreciated and promoted the different cultural heritages of native Canadians, French Canadians and immigrants from different countries.

== Early years ==
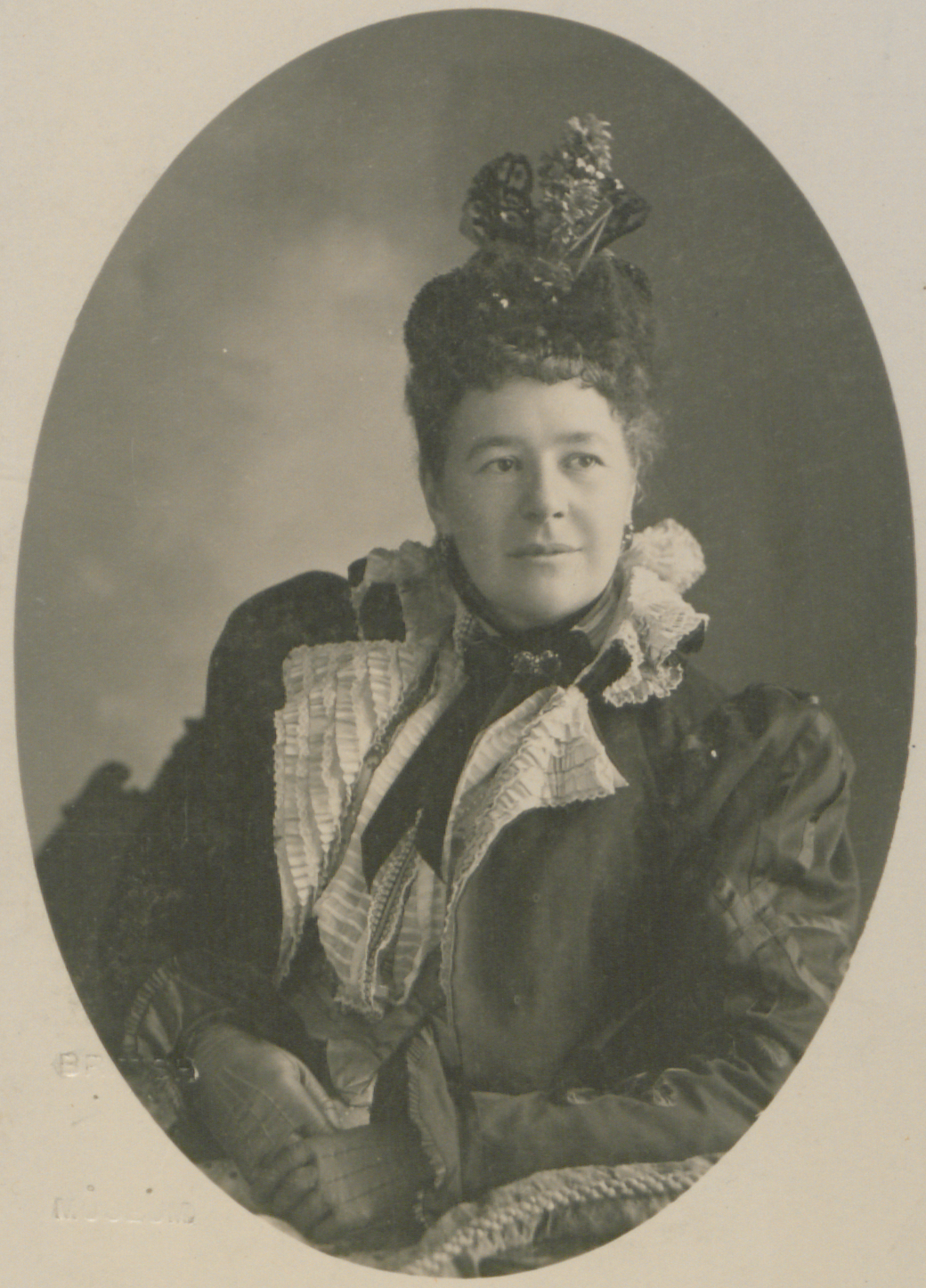
Lady Aberdeen, first patron of the WAAC (1898)

The first branches after the 1892 incorporation in Toronto were founded in Winnipeg, London, Ontario, and Montreal. The Hamilton, branch was established in 1894. Late in 1893 the WAAC became the first women's organization to affiliate with the National Council of Women of Canada, which had been founded on the initiative of Lady Aberdeen, wife of the Governor General of Canada from 1893 to 1898. The WAAC elected Lady Aberdeen as patron. (Note: The WAAC and the National Council of Women of Canada were among a number of Women's organizations founded around this time and run by exceptionally capable women, others being the Imperial Order Daughters of the Empire (IODE), the Young Women's Christian Association (YWCA), the Girls' Friendly Society of Canada, the Dominion Women's Enfranchisement Association, Women's Institutes and the Woman's Christian Temperance Union (WCTU).) This established a tradition that has been followed since then by all the wives of Governors General. Florence Deeks, who in 1912 prepared a "historical sketch" of the early years of the association, seems likely to have joined in the mid-1890s.

The group held thirteen annual exhibitions from 1889 to 1901, and occasional loan exhibitions after that. The catalogues for the early exhibitions include paintings and sketches by members, and works on loan from private collections. Often there were also handicrafts made by members. In the 1900 exhibition there were oil and watercolour paintings, pastel drawings, designs, miniatures and 112 handicraft items. There was also a loan exhibit that showed decorative art from many different places and ages. The catalogue said these specimens were intended to show "the possibilities open to women of artistic bent". In 1896 the WAAC proposed that a State Dinner Service of painted china be made by Alice Mary Egan of Halifax, Nova Scotia, and twelve other artists from Ontario and Quebec. The service was made and was a success.

The WAAC opened branches across Canada, eventually reaching Alberta in the west and New Brunswick in the east. By 1898 there were almost 1,000 members. The Montreal branch of the Women's Art Association was founded in 1894 by Mary Martha Phillips and Mary Alice Peck. In 1907 it broke away from the WAAC and formed the independent Women's Art Society of Montreal. This was extremely successful, and in 1911 had to impose a cap of 350 members. Despite taking the name l'Association culturelle des femmes de Montréal in 1981, it remained essentially Anglophone. The Montreal society remains active today. (Note: The Montreal WAAC was a precursor of the Canadian Handicrafts Guild. The same women were involved in both organizations. The Handicrafts Guild, led by Alice Peck and May Phillips, was incorporated in 1906.)

The Winnipeg Branch of the WAAC was established in February 1894. It separated its members into "active" and "honorary", the first group being professional artists or serious students of art, and the second being women who were interested in the arts. Membership rose from about 20 in 1894 to 188 in 1907. Most of the members grew impatient with the degree of control exerted by Mary Dignam, and broke away in 1908 to form the Western Art Association. The last groups associated with the WAAC in Winnipeg disbanded in 1909.

== Later evolution ==
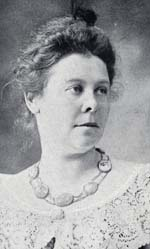
Mary Dignam, the founder and long-time president, c. 1903

In 1912 the Toronto-based association was formally incorporated under federal legislation as the Women's Art Association of Canada. Mary Dignam was president until 1913, and remained in an advisory role for many years after. In 1936 she returned as president for the 50th anniversary of the WAAC. Matilda Ridout Edgar (1844–1910), historian, feminist and wife of the politician and businessman James David Edgar, was also associated with the WAAC in its early years.

Howard and Lorrie Dunington-Grubb, well-known landscape gardeners, moved to Toronto in 1911 and soon after founded Sheridan Nurseries. Howard became a member of the Arts and Letters Club of Toronto, but Lorrie was unable to join since she was a woman. Lorrie became involved with the Women's Art Association around 1915 and was president of the WAAC from 1925 to 1930. Lorrie was also an active member of the Lyceum Club of Toronto and the Heliconian Club, both devoted to women's involvement in the arts. In April 1930 the WAAC became affiliated with the Lyceum Club of London, England, and changed its name to the Lyceum Club and Women's Art Association of Canada.

The branch in St. Thomas, Ontario, illustrates the evolution of one local branch. It was founded by eleven members at a meeting at the St. Thomas Business College on 26 March 1895, with the painter and teacher Miss Susan Paul as first president. The branch met at different locations, including the YWCA, the St. Thomas-Elgin Art Gallery and Sifton House at Alma College. Membership fees were the main source of funding, but the branch also held exhibitions, lectures, teas and other events. The branch arranged tours of studios and museums, and sponsored display of artwork in schools. It was most active from the late 1940s to the mid 1950s, when it usually had more than 100 paid members. After this the branch slowly declined in activity and membership, and closed around 1990.

The sculptor Frances Loring was president of the WAAC from 1938 to 1940. The name was changed back to the Women's Art Association of Canada after World War II (1939–45). The WAAC remains active, and as of 2014 had 200 members, including women and men. It is based in a Victorian-era house in downtown Toronto. The building at 23 Prince Arthur Avenue was purchased in 1916 for $13,000. The adjoining house at 21 Prince Arthur Avenue was purchased in 1924. It contains the Dignam Gallery and has a large garden landscaped in traditional style. The houses at #21-23 Prince Arthur are in Second Empire style. Roughcast stucco was later covered by siding. Neighboring houses have eclectic architectural styles ranging from Italianate to crenelated Tudor Revival. The garden is named after Lorrie Dunington-Grubb.

== Activities ==
The WAAC founded a gallery where its members' work could be exhibited, and arranged sales and shows of paintings and sculpture. The organization arranged lectures and even staged outdoor dramatic productions. It provided courses in jewellery making, weaving and ceramics. The Home Industries Department supported craftswomen involved in pottery, weaving and embroidery, and gave them a means to become known to the public and to sell their work. It marketed products such as traditional hooked rugs and French-Canadian homespuns.

Emily Carr held her first solo show in eastern Canada in 1935 at the WAAC gallery in Toronto. (Note: Carr noted in her diary on 19 October 1935 "I have known for some days that I was to have an exhibition at the "Woman's Art." I felt a little thrilled about this—a chance to see if my work means anything to the outside world." The Saturday Night review of her showing at the WAAC at 23 Prince Arthur Avenue was enthusiastic, saying, "She paints quickly and with a fierceness and passion that are completely convincing. Her technique is astonishing... there is in her work, despite its strength and dynamic movement, a joyous quality reminiscent of the early work of Vlaminck...") The gallery often showed sculptures by Frances Loring and Florence Wyle. The WAAC also sponsored music, dance and literature. It arranged scholarship for young performance artists, and arranged concerts and readings. In the 1920s and 1930s the WAAC staged tableaux vivants in their garden in Toronto. From 1917 they have held an annual garden party there.

The WAAC remained active in the National Council of Women until the 1970s. The WAAC continues to provide scholarships to students at institutions such as Canada's National Ballet School, The Royal Conservatory of Music, the University of Toronto Faculty of Music, OCAD University, Sheridan College and George Brown College. Members raise funds through art shows and auctions, an annual garden party, textile shows and book sales. The gallery and garden of the headquarters building are available for rental for use in shows and events.
