= Mabel May =

Canadian artist (1877–1971)

Henrietta Mabel May
- Born: September 11, 1877; Montreal, Quebec
- Died: October 8, 1971 (aged 94); Burnaby, British Columbia
- Education: Art Association of Montreal
- Notable work: Women Making Shells (1919), Three Sisters (1915), Melting Snow (1924)
- Movement: Beaver Hall Group, Canadian Group of Painters
- Elected: Royal Canadian Academy of Arts, associate

Henrietta Mabel May (September 11, 1877 – October 8, 1971) was a Canadian artist in the early 20th century. She helped organize two significant groups of Canadian artists and extended collegiality to women within those groups.

== Career ==
Henrietta Mabel May was born in Montreal and grew up in Verdun and Westmount. As a teenager, May showed an interest in art; however due to a sense of family responsibility, May, the fifth of ten children, postponed academic studies until her mid-twenties to look after her younger siblings. She enrolled at the Art Association of Montreal, where she studied with William Brymner and Alberta Cleland until 1912. Much like other Brymner students, she was then encouraged to travel to Europe. She spent a year there, from 1912 to 1913, during which she and her friend Emily Coonan travelled to Paris, Brittany, and London, among other places. The work she painted abroad, genre scenes and figure groupings demonstrate her knowledge of what she learned abroad, Impressionism. She returned from Europe ready to apply what she had learned to scenes of her homeland. During the First World War, she was commissioned by the Canadian War Memorials Fund to record the efforts of women working in Montreal munitions factories in paintings such as Women Making Shells (1919, Canadian War Museum). Following 1920 she painted in a style influenced by Post-Impressionism, and the Group of Seven and her work become more stylized.

May was based in Quebec early in her career, then worked as a teacher from her studio in Montreal, at the Elmwood School in Ottawa. She was associated with the National Gallery of Canada in Ottawa, Ontario for a decade, returned to Quebec and ended her career in Vancouver, British Columbia. She showed with or organized groups including the Art Association of Montreal, the Beaver Hall Group and the Canadian Group of Painters. Her works are in the collection of the Canadian War Museum, the National Gallery of Canada, the Musée des Beaux-Arts Montréal, Musée National des Beaux-Arts du Québec, the Vancouver Art Gallery and other galleries.

One art critic referred to May as the "Emily Carr of Montreal" due to her interest in landscape and nature. Her art was originally influenced by her avid interest in French Impressionism, but her mature style owed much to the Group of Seven and more international modernist trends.

== Early life ==
May was born to Evelyn Henrietta Walker and Edward May. Her date of birth is often reported as 1884, but she was in fact born on September 11, 1877. Her father, Edward May was a self-made man and became the mayor of Verdun, a borough on the outskirts of Montreal. He later became a successful real estate developer and moved her and the rest of her family to a more prosperous neighbourhood in Montreal called Westmount.

== Education ==
Though Henrietta displayed an active interest in art throughout her early years, she did not pursue formal education until she was in her mid-twenties. She delayed her education in order to help take care of her nine younger brothers and sisters while her parents worked trying to provide for them. In 1902, she became one of the first female students enrolled in the Art Association of Montreal (AAM) (1909 – 1912) with teachers Alberta Cleland and William Brymner. There she was awarded scholarships twice. During this time, she exhibited small watercolours as part of the 1910 Art Association of Montreal Annual Spring Exhibition. Cleland was a woman artist from Montreal who worked with a broad range of subjects and tools. Brymner was an important influence on Mabel's style of art and taught her from 1909 until the end of her studies in 1912. May was influenced by Brymner's teachings of French modernism, including Impressionism and Post-Impressionism and his encouragement for students to find their own individual style. These influences took her and her friend fellow artist Emily Coonan to France, England and Holland after her graduation in 1912. There she travelled, visited galleries, studied and painted until her return to Montreal in 1913 where she opened a studio. During her travels, she studied with James Wilson Morrice, who strongly influenced her style of painting. Her family owned a second home in the countryside of Hudson, Quebec, where she frequently retreated to paint.

== Career ==
The years following her education brought May a series of remarkable achievements and work opportunities. In 1913 the National Gallery of Canada bought three of her art works and would eventually buy two more before 1924. In 1916, after May returned to Montreal, she joined other female artists who worked on commissioned pieces specifically about women's involvement in the First World War. One of her major works was a detailed six-by-seven foot canvas entitled Women Making Shells (1919) honouring munitions workers in a factory. Characterized by scattered light and textured brushwork, this painting displays May’s interest in Impressionism. During May's commissioned employment with the Royal Canadian Academy, she made 250 dollars per month, a large fee at that time.

== Beaver Hall Group ==
In 1920, May was a founding member of the Beaver Hall Group in Montreal, which supported the local Montreal art community and organized exhibits of their work. Initially led by A. Y. Jackson of the Group of Seven, the Beaver Hall Group was a selection of talented painters from Montreal; most of them had attended the Art Association of Montreal and/or studied under William Brymner. The Beaver Hall Group was extremely progressive at the time for allowing women to join and have important roles and positions. Though the group officially disbanded around 1924, a majority of the female members continued to do artistic work afterwards, nearly all of them foregoing marriage or childbearing to do so. Many of the women continued to work with and exhibit with each other. Among those were Prudence Heward, Lilias Torrance Newton, Mabel Lockerby, Anne Savage, Sarah Robertson, Nora Collyer, Kathleen Morris, Ethel Seath and Emily Coonan, with whom May had travelled in Europe in 1912, was also a member of the group but preferred to go her own way when the group disbanded.

In the winter of 1924, May travelled to Baie-Saint-Paul, where she painted with A.Y. Jackson of the Group of Seven. May developed a landscape style in part based on the aesthetic of the group. In 1927, May, along with three other women from the Beaver Hall Group, met with the British Columbian painter Emily Carr.

== Canadian Group of Painters ==
Shortly after the Beaver Hall Group dissolved, May founded a new group: the Canadian Group of Painters, which officially began in 1933. The group had their first exhibition the same year of their founding in Atlantic City, New Jersey, followed by another exhibition in Toronto a few months later. The group was the successor of the Group of Seven and the Beaver Hall Group. May's involvement with the Canadian Group of Painters lasted a few years, but while she was in that group, the problems of the Great Depression affected her and her family's finances. She moved to Ottawa, Ontario, where she taught in a private school. In 1938, she was appointed leader of children's classes at the National Gallery of Canada. She taught for 12 years until 1950, when she returned to Montreal, before later moving to Vancouver, British Columbia.

== Artistic style ==
Henrietta Mabel May's primary medium was painting in oil. Initially, she followed the Impressionists. Her main focus was landscapes, although she also painted human figures. Her paint strokes were very strong and pleasing to the eye as the colours flowed together softly. The colours she used were not straight from the tube but blended for more of a naturalistic approach. While May travelled to Europe, she was inspired by the culture of Paris, which was incorporated into her work.

During the time she spent in Hudson every summer, she painted the views around her, creating some of her most successful works. In 1913 her paintings began garnering a lot of recognition and attention. She won the Art Association of Montreal's Jessie Dow Award in 1914 and 1918. She sold four of her works to the National Gallery of Canada and continued to sell several more in the following years. She was elected as an associate of the Royal Canadian Academy of Arts in 1915. May was a bold painter who could paint unusual scenes that people did not expect from a woman. For example, Women Making Shells was a powerful painting conveying a scene where women were working in a factory along with men, a novel scene at that time.

Once she became a member of the Beaver Hall Group, her style began to deviate from its impressionistic origins. As the years went on, May's naturalistic approach of applying colour in soothing, rhythmic brushstrokes developed greatly. Her art exhibited more realism, and showed a greater understanding of light and the atmosphere in her landscapes. She began to take on the style of the Group of Seven by whom she was heavily influenced. May's Melting Snow (1925) was a reflection of the dancing waters and lyrical mountains surrounded by flat colours and hills. In addition, she used loose brushstrokes in the sky.

Her palette was further modified by the influence of a religious group she joined in the late 1930s. An offshoot of the theosophists, the I AM group believed that dark colors produce negative effects.

== Collections ==
- The Market under the Trees (1912-3), The Regatta (1914), Street Scene, Montreal (1914), Boats on the St. Lawrence (1916), In the Laurentians (1925), The Village (1925), and Melting Snow (1925) are part of the permanent collection of the National Gallery of Canada.
- Été (about 1935) and Paysage d'automne (about 1930) are both part of the permanent collection at the Musée national des beaux-arts du Québec.
- Three Sisters (1915) is part of the Beaverbrook Art Gallery collection.
- Snowflakes, Studio Window (1925) is part of the Montreal Museum of Fine Arts.
- Autumn in the Laurentians (1925) is part of the permanent collection of the Vancouver Art Gallery.

== Exhibitions ==
May exhibited frequently. She participated in the Art Association of Montreal's spring exhibitions from 1910 to 1967, and in the exhibitions of the Royal Canadian Academy of Arts from 1910 to 1952. She also showed with the Group of Seven in Toronto in 1928, 1930, and 1931 and, as a founding member of the Canadian Group of Painters in 1933, she also exhibited with them. From 1938 to 1947, she showed her work with a group called Le Caveau. May's international exposure in group shows included the influential British Empire Exhibition in Wembley, England, the Musée du Jeu de Paume in Paris, the Corcoran Gallery of Art in Washington, DC as well as the Tate Gallery in London, among others. Upon her retirement to Vancouver at the age of 50, she held a retrospective of her work at the Dominion Gallery. This show resulted in the sale of 100 of her paintings. A posthumous exhibition of her work along with other works from the Beaver Hall Group occurred at the Sir George Williams Art Galleries (now Concordia Art Gallery) in October 1982. In 2015, the Musée des Beaux-Arts Montréal organized a multi-museum tour of a show containing May's work among others: 1920s Modernism in Montreal: The Beaver Hall Group.

== Personal life ==
May never married, but was immersed in the family life of her nine brothers and sisters. After the dissolution of the Beaver Hall Group's studios, she retained close personal friendships with the remaining female artists, including Lilias Torrance Newton, Mabel Lockerby, Anne Savage, Sarah Robertson, and Nora Collyer. Savage remembered her as both a painter and a person:

She was a brilliant figure at the gallery. She painted with such vigour and strength - gay, rhythmic colour using the impressionist's technique of scintillating colour. She spent some time in France, came back radiant - loved life - painted in the landscapes of the Eastern Townships, where she built up her singing happy pictures.
