= Nora Collyer =

Canadian modernist painter (1898–1979)

- Born: Nora Frances Elizabeth Collyer; June 7, 1898; Montreal, Quebec
- Died: June 7, 1979 (aged 81); Montreal
- Education: Art Association of Montreal (AAM), where she studied with Alberta Cleland, William Brymner, and Maurice Cullen
- Known for: artist, educator

Nora Frances Elizabeth Collyer (June 7, 1898 – June 11, 1979) was a Canadian modernist painter who was inspired by the Canadian landscape, nature, and urban communities. Both an artist and a teacher, she received her formal art training at the Art Association of Montreal (AAM), where she studied with Alberta Cleland, William Brymner, and Maurice Cullen. Nora Collyer was the youngest of the ten women artists who today are commonly referred to as the Beaver Hall Group. Aside from being an artist and a teacher, she was also a volunteer for the Children's Memorial Hospital of Montreal. Collyer's work was exhibited at the British Empire Exhibition at Wembley, England, in 1924 and 1925, as well as at the 1939 New York World's Fair.

== Early life and education ==
Collyer was born in Montreal, Quebec on June 7, 1898. Her father, Alfred Collyer (1872–1946), left England at the age of sixteen, and after graduating from McGill University he joined the General Electric Company of Canada. Around the time of Nora's birth, the family moved to Tupper Street in Westmount, a suburb of Montreal, where they lived until 1916. In her youth, Collyer attended Trafalgar School for Girls from 1910 until her graduation in 1917. Collyer, an only child until the age of twelve, and very shy, benefited from the small classes and intimate atmosphere of a private school. Two girls whom she'd met there, Margaret Taylor and Jane Speir, became her lifelong friends.

Collyer, along with other artists Anne Savage, Sarah Robertson, Mabel Lockerby, and Kathleen Morris, received virtually all their professional training at the Art Association of Montreal (AAM). Collyer studied for nine years at the AAM with Alberta Cleland, William Brymner, and Maurice Cullen. Brymner, who was a director for thirty-five years, had previously trained in Paris at the Académie Julian and organized the Montreal school on the Parisian model. Brymner's emphasis on the importance of self-expression and enthusiasm for new developments became greatly evident in Collyer's work.

== Joining the Beaver Hall Group ==
Collyer became a member of the Beaver Hall Hill Group at the time of its Montreal establishment in the fall of 1920. Anne Savage and Collyer were the only Beaver Hall women who completed their secondary education. The President and co-founder, A. Y. Jackson, provided an important link between the Group of Seven and the Beaver Hall Group. He encouraged the women to free themselves of their old-fashioned academic training and to disregard female stereotypes. Nora and her female colleagues took this advice; they broke with Victorian convention despite social standards of the time.

== The Beaver Hall Group ==
The Beaver Hall Group was one of Canada's most iconic unstructured artistic associations. The group only survived for a year and a half, but the friendships and alliances formed continued through the next two decades. The group held four exhibitions during its short existence, and at least one other show was held in the group's “club rooms,” from 22 November to 4 December 1920.

Collyer left AAM in May 1921, and later shared a studio with Anne Savage. In 1924 the artists could no longer afford their studios; however, the women members who remained after the studios were closed to them, Mabel May, Lilias Torrance Newton, Mabel Lockerby, Anne Savage, Sarah Robertson, and Nora Collyer formed a network of friends who supported each other and expanded to include Prudence Heward, Kathleen Morris, and Ethel Seath.

== Style and technique ==
Afternoon, the Village of Cap-à-l'Aigle Overlooking the St. Lawrence River, 1950

The sketching trips Collyer took as a student with Maurice Cullen resulted in a harmonious and rhythmic technique. Collyer's work was known for its shapes, rich colours, and soft rhythms. Her paintings were rarely figurative and did not focus on people; her favourite subjects were flowers, the forest, riverscapes, nature, old houses, villages, and churches, as in Afternoon, the Village of Cap-à-l'Aigle Overlooking the St. Lawrence River, 1950. Although Nora was aware of social problems and volunteered in hospitals, these concerns were not depicted in any of her paintings, and she did not use her painting as a direct vehicle for social commentary. Rather, her paintings focused on picturesque subjects, such as Mount Royal and the old Martello Towers of Quebec.

Anne Savage had claimed that Collyer's work had a "freshness and vitality" that convey a lively sensitivity to both the rural and urban environments. Nora Collyer composed her images carefully, creating an interplay between the diagonals of the flowering trees, the triangular messes of land, and the horizontal bands of blue rivers, brown trees and mauve-blue hills. In addition, she would also make buildings such as a church or a barn as the focal point of the composition, as in Village Church In Summer (unknown date)

== Teaching career ==
With a shining reference from William Brymner (a mentor at AAM), Collyer began her teaching career in September 1925. Although she had no previous training in teaching, she was appointed art mistress at Trafalgar School, with an annual salary of $800. After five years, her teaching career was brought to an abrupt halt due to the passing of her mother, Gertrude Palmer Collyer, on September 20, 1930. Collyer felt obligated to return home to manage the household for her father and brother. Inspired by her mother's volunteer work with the Anglican Church, Nora began to teach art at the Children's Memorial Hospital and other institutions. Some years later after her father's death in 1946, she became even more active as a teacher; organizing classes for children and adults in her own home. Kathleen Morris's niece, Susan Kilburn, attended one of Collyer's children's classes in the late 1940s and in 1953 took private lessons at Collyer's duplex on Elm Avenue. One of Collyer's preferred teaching techniques was to set up a still life for her student to paint, using it to demonstrate the use of contrast in painting.

== Later years ==
Collyer kept up relationships with her friends from Trafalgar School, but her closest friend was Margaret Reid, who supplied the social ease in which she lacked. After her father's death in 1946, Collyer took an apartment at 3400 Ridgewood where she was later joined by Reid. Four years later, the two women bought a lot overlooking Lake Memphremagog where they built a summer cottage they called Strawberry Hill. Collyer would spend the summer there sketching and gardening and Margaret would visit on weekends. They had this cottage until 1967.

Collyer and Reid moved into a duplex in Westmount in 1953, where Collyer used her sitting room for teaching. Reid had a family history with Alzheimer's disease, and in later years began to show symptoms of the disease. Collyer took care of her as long as she could, but finally had to put her in a nursing home. Collyer lived in the duplex until she died on June 11, 1979, just twelve days after her friend.

== Legacy ==
There have been five retrospectives devoted to her work:

- Dominion Gallery, Montreal (1946)
- Walter Klinkhoff Gallery, Montreal (1964)
- National Gallery of Canada, Ottawa (1969)
- Paul Kastel Gallery, Montreal (1971)
- Galerie Continentale, Montreal (1981)
