= Sarah Robertson (painter) =

Canadian painter (1891–1948)

- Born: Sarah Margaret Armour Robertson; June 16, 1891; Montreal, Canada
- Died: December 6, 1948 (aged 57); Montreal, Canada
- Known for: Painter

Sarah Margaret Armour Robertson (June 16, 1891 – December 6, 1948) was a Canadian painter of landscapes, still lifes, portraits, and murals for private homes.

== Early life ==
Robertson was born in Montreal on June 16, 1891, the daughter of John Armour Robertson and Jessie Anne Christie, and the oldest of four siblings. Her parents were originally from Scotland. She was educated in Montreal. During her childhood, the family lived comfortably, but later faced financial struggles. She began art studies at the age of nineteen with a Wood Scholarship to the Art Association of Montreal under William Brymner and Maurice Cullen. World War I interrupted her studies, after which she continued them from 1921 to 1924 under Randolph Hewton, a founding member of the Canadian Group of Painters, and Wood Scholarship winner.

== Artistic career ==
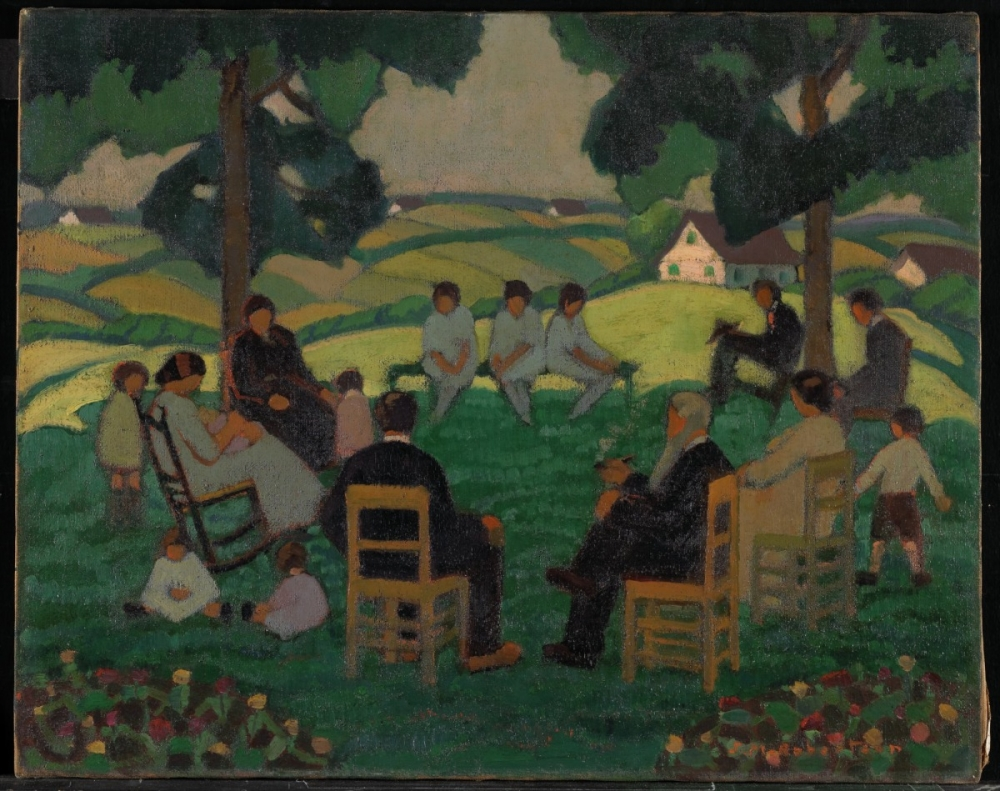
Le Repos, c. 1926. Oil on canvas. In the permanent collection of the National Gallery of Canada.

During her last few years at the Art Association, Robertson joined former and current students, and fellow artists, along with her teacher Randolph Hewton, in the Beaver Hall Group. A. Y. Jackson was the president of the group named after the Montreal street, Beaver Hall Hill. Robertson became close friends with Prudence Heward. Both painters were dedicated to their art and often painted together. Robertson's work was shown in a solo exhibition at the National Gallery of Canada in 1951. Robertson also exhibited in the United States, in group exhibitions at the Yale University Art Gallery in 1944, the Museu Nacional de Belas Artes in Rio de Janeiro, and the Riverside Museum in New York.

== Later life ==
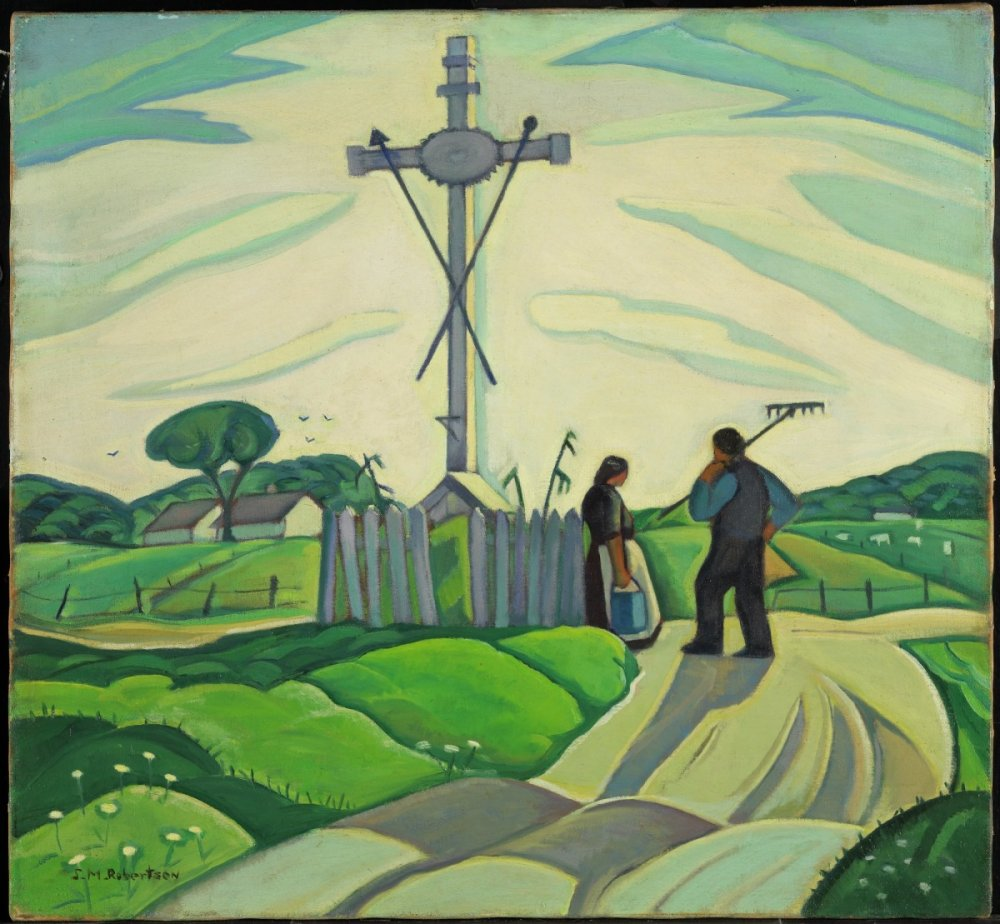
Joseph and Marie-Louise, c. 1930. Oil on canvas. In the permanent collection of the National Gallery of Canada.

Robertson's later work was freer in composition and bolder in colors. It reflected her love of nature, and her unique style. She died on 6 December 1948 in Montreal.

== Associations with other artists and groups ==
The Beaver Hall Group was a Montreal-based group of Canadian painters who met in late 1910 while studying art at a school run by the Art Association of Montreal. Nora Collyer, Emily Coonan, Prudence Heward, Mabel Lockerby, Mabel May, Kathleen Morris, Lilias Torrance Newton, Sarah Robertson, Anne Savage and Ethel Seath were part of this group, sometimes known the Beaver Hall Hill Group or Beaver Hall Women. This association of nineteen Montreal artists, eight of whom were women, had been committed to developing distinctive artistic visions while acknowledging the influence of the Group of Seven, and French modernism. The Beaver Hall artists held their annual exhibition at their studios on Beaver Hall Hill. By the end of 1921, the Beaver Hall group ran into serious financial difficulties which necessitated relinquishing their studios. The men went their own way, but most of the women remained in close touch with each other.

In the summers, Robertson would also visit Prudence Heward at her family's summer home near Brockville on the St. Lawrence River. At the same time, Robertson also maintained a long correspondence with A.Y. Jackson, who offered vital critical judgment. Jackson was a close friend of both Robertson and Heward. Some of Robertson’s paintings were inspired by her visits to the Hewards' summer home.

Robertson was a founding member of the Canadian Group of Painters, exhibiting with them for many years. The group was made up of 28 different English-speaking painters from across Canada. This group was instrumental in establishing a new direction for Canadian art, expressing the diversity of the Canadian experience of landscapes and buildings based on the vision of the Group of Seven.

== Exhibitions and collections ==
Robertson's paintings appeared in exhibitions of Canadian art at Wembley, England, in 1924 and 1925 and she was invited to participate in shows by the Group of Seven in 1928, 1930 and 1931.

Robertson's works are included in the collections of the National Gallery of Canada, the Montreal Museum of Fine Arts, the University of Alberta, and the Art Gallery of Ontario.

Although she mainly painted landscapes in oil, she also painted still lifes and portraits, as well as murals for private homes.

== Bibliography ==
- Millar, Joyce. "The Beaver Hall Group: Painting in Montreal, 1920-1940." Woman's Art Journal 13.1 (1992): 3. Web.
- "Independent spirit: early Canadian women artists." Choice Reviews Online 46.09 (2009): n. page. Web.
