= Pepita Ferrari =

Canadian filmmaker

- Born: 1952
- Died: December 30, 2018 (aged 65–66); Lac Brome, Quebec
- Occupation: Filmmaker

Pepita Ferrari (1952 - 2018) was a Canadian filmmaker. In 1994 she began her long-standing relationship with the National Film Board of Canada, who produced seven of her films, five of which are available to stream online in both English and French. Her directorial debut By Woman's Hand was a documentary about the Beaver Hall Group, a group of Canadian women painters, who were associated with the Group of Seven. Ferrari focused on the three most prominent artists from the group: Prudence Heward, Sarah Robertson and Anne Savage. Her 2010 documentary Capturing Reality: The Art of Documentary features well-known living documentary filmmakers such as Nick Broomfield, Werner Herzog, Kim Longinotto and Errol Morris watching their own films and discussing the technical and ethical choices that guided their work. The film sets out to answer the question - “What is documentary?” - by taking the viewer through the process of creating a documentary from initial idea to final edit. Ferrari also wrote for Point of View, a Canadian magazine about documentary film and photography.

Pepita Ferrari died at her home in Lac Brome, Quebec on December 30, 2018.

== Filmography ==
Year	Film	Director	Producer	Writer	Notes
2011	Source	Yes			Short
2008	Capturing Reality	Yes			Documentary
2006	Canticum Canticorum	Yes			
2004	The Unsexing of Emma Edmonds	Yes	Yes	Yes	TV movie
2001	Dogs with Jobs: Willy & Rope	Yes			TV series documentary
2001	Dogs with Jobs: Kavic & Mas	Yes		Yes	TV series documentary
2001	Dogs with Jobs: Petro & Mel	Yes			TV series documentary
1997	The Petticoat Expeditions	Yes		Yes	
1997	The Petticoat Expeditions: Part One: Anna Jameson	Yes		Yes	Short
1997	The Petticoat Expeditions: Part Two: Frances Hopkins	Yes		Yes	Short
1997	The Petticoat Expeditions: Part Three: Countess of Aberdeen	Yes		Yes	Short
1994	By Woman's Hand	Yes	Yes	Yes	Documentary about Beaver Hall Group
