= Ethel Seath =

Canadian artist (1879–1963)

- Born: February 5, 1879; Montreal, Quebec, Canada
- Died: April 10, 1963 (aged 84)
- Education: Art Association of Montreal
- Movement: Beaver Hall Group

Ethel Seath (February 5, 1879 – April 10, 1963) was a Canadian artist. Seath was a prominent figure on the Montreal art scene for sixty years and her artistic work included being a painter, printmaker (etching), commercial artist, and art instructor at the all-girls private school, The Study, in Montreal. Seath’s oil and watercolour paintings were primarily still life and landscape, exploring colour and adding abstract elements to everyday scenes.

== Career ==
Due to her father’s failing business, chronic health issues and later separation from her mother, Seath joined the workforce right after high school to help support her mother and four siblings. She spent two decades as a commercial illustrator for various newspapers, the Montreal Witness and later the Montreal Star, constantly improving with supportive mentors at the companies. Seath achieved success within her illustrative career and financially she was able to afford art classes at the Art Association of Montreal and sketching trips of the Quebec countryside with Maurice Cullen. She began instructing art as a teacher at The Study which she continued for forty-five years. Her teaching methods were creative unlike the conformism of Victorian times. Being up to date with new trends, Seath encouraged creativity and exploration believing that, "The aims of Art education are to help children to see, to feel and to express beauty with clean, spontaneous feeling. It should given them the ability to use the experience of everyday life creatively, in order that they may gain increased intelligence through the use of their hands . . . Nearly all children have something to say through drawing, and training in Art results in refinement of thought, eye and hand."

Seath was a founding member of the Beaver Hall Group and was also a member of the Canadian Group of Painters in which she entered art into local and international exhibitions such as in Baltimore, Maryland (1931), Yale University, Cambridge, and Massachusetts. Her work was also exhibited at the British Empire Exhibition at Wembley, England in 1924 and 1925, at the 1939 New York World's Fair and at the exhibition A Century of Canadian Art at the Tate in London, England.

== Early life ==
The daughter of Norman Alexander Seath and Lizetta Annie Foulds, Seath was born to a Scottish-Presbyterian family in Montreal on February 5, 1879. Her father had an unsuccessful business in importing leather goods, and also struggled with chronic illness; evidence suggests he was an alcoholic which led to the separation of her parents when she was a teenager. After Seath's parents separated she helped her mother raise her four siblings. To help support her family when she finished high school in 1896, she joined the workforce at the age of 17 and went straight to work at the Montreal Star where she was inspired by the head of the art department, who at the time was well-known cartoonist Arthur G. Racey. In 1901, Seath moved to the art staff on the Montreal Star where the dean of Canadian illustrators, Henri Julien, was another influence on the young artist who described him as supportive and helpful "with his splendid knowledge and talents.". Seath spent three years studying drawing with Edmond Dyonnet at the Conseil and lithography with J. A. Harris at the Board of Arts and Manufactures of Montreal during the late 1890s. Her drawing skills improved and her illustrations became a regular addition to the Weekly Star.

In 1903, Seath was the first and only female contributor to the AAM exhibition organized by the Newspaper Artists' Association which shows her acclaim in a primarily male world of newspaper illustration. The Art Association of Montreal published a registry of local Canadian artists on June 29, 1903, noting that Seath was the youngest of the artists to be working in black and white. In Seath's time working as a successful commercial artist she was able to afford art classes at William Brymner's Art Association of Montreal. Brymner brought light and colour to Seath's artwork which had primarily been in black and white. She pursued the use of bold colours when she embarked on open air sketching trips with Maurice Cullen into the Quebec countryside in 1911. Seath furthered her training at the Cape Cod School of Art in Provincetown with Charles Hawthorne. Seath pursued art from beyond her illustration work for newspapers and started to exhibit her work of etchings, watercolours, and oil paintings.

== Artistic career ==
=== Early training ===
Seath began her training in textile design at the Conseil des Arts et Manufactures, in the late 1890s. There, she took drawing and lithography classes, under Edmond Dyonnet and Robert Harris, respectively. At seventeen, she found work as a commercial illustrator for the Montreal Witness, and later joined the art staff at the Montreal Star in 1901. With the influence and encouragement of her mentors, the Montreal Witness's caricaturist, Arthur G. Racey and political cartoonist, Henri Julien, within two years of working at the Montreal Star, Seath’s illustrations experienced a rapid improvement. Bolstered by her success in her chosen profession, Seath attended William Brymner and Maurice Cullen's summer plein air sketching classes at the Art Association of Montreal. Later, she continued her studies with Charles Hawthorne, an American painter and renowned figure, at his school the Cape Cod School of Art in Provincetown, Massachusetts.

Since 1903, Seath proved to possess a strong, emotional affinity toward nature and everyday objects. Thus, she often painted still lifes and landscapes, documenting the domestic, rural, and urban life around her. Seath worked in a variety of media, such as charcoal, gouache, oil paint, pastel, watercolour, graphite, pen and ink. Post Impressionism and Fauvism influenced her style, and she took particular interest in abstraction and realism. This is evident in her still lifes and cityscapes, most of which favour a vibrant, yet earthy, colour palette with distinctive, curvilinear forms. In 1905, Seath submitted some of her oil paintings to the Art Association of Montreal's spring exhibition. The following year, she participated in the annual exhibition at the Royal Canadian Academy of Arts.

In 1917, Seath—having worked a cumulative twenty years as a newspaper illustrator for the Montreal Witness, the Star, the Weekly Star, and latterly the Family Herald—was invited to teach at the Montreal all-girls private school, The Study, by her friend and school founder, Margaret Gascoigne. At The Study, Seath taught with a passion that belied her shy, retiring disposition. Disregarding the traditional Victorian values and attitudes embraced at the time, Seath's strong personality and progressive teaching methods sought to liberate the imagination, intuition, and spontaneity of an entire generation of young followers.

=== Mid-career and the Beaver Hall Group ===
Around 1920, Seath joined a diverse coterie of artists, known as the Beaver Hall Hill Group. Contrary to the patriarchal Group of Seven, the Beaver Hall Hill Group welcomed both male and female artists, held exhibitions of their combined work, and granted them access to other social events. Although the works they produced expressed each artist’s individual style and perspective, as a whole they presented a unified vision in their colour and mood. Insufficient funds eventually led to the group’s dissolution; however, many of its female members remained in close contact with each other soon afterwards.

Notwithstanding her teaching responsibilities, Seath continued to find time to participate and exhibit her work. During the 1920s and 1930s, she—along with Beaver Hall colleagues Sarah Robertson, Kathleen Morris, and Anne Savage—designed a series of Christmas cards inspired by Canadian artists for Rous and Mann. In 1925, she created woodcut illustrations for Gascoigne’s Chansons of Old French Canada.

Due to the Great Depression, Seath, along with many other Beaver Hall artists, sought additional means to supplement their waning income. During those financially turbulent years, Seath—having already experienced multiple wage cuts—grew anxious about her tenure at The Study. Consequently, in 1937, she in conjunction with Anne Savage organized Saturday morning modelling classes for children at the Art Association of Montreal.

In 1939, Seath was elected a member of the Contemporary Arts Society of Montreal, an honour that was bestowed again the following year by the Federation of Canadian Artists. Although Seath was gradually gaining recognition for her skills, she—like many aspiring female artists of this period—still struggled to exhibit her work in galleries. Despite the disbandment of the Beaver Hall Hill Group, many of its members continued to identify and organize group exhibitions under the association’s name. Seath soon realized that by forming a unified alliance, the women painters stood a greater chance of attracting art curators and collectors to view their works. Therefore, in 1940, with the Beaver Hall painters’ support of each other, Seath joined a four-woman show with Prudence Heward, Sarah Robertson, and Anne Savage at the Art Gallery of Toronto. She took part in several more group exhibitions, one in 1944 (December 4–30) at the Art Association of Montreal, another in 1945 at the Willistead Art Gallery (today, Art Gallery of Windsor), as well as a daunting six-woman show in 1950 (May 3–24) at the Montreal Museum of Fine Arts, Gallery XII.

=== Later career and life ===
In her latter years, Seath, with her duties to The Study and her responsibilities caring for her ailing mother, gradually withdrew from the art community. Endorsed by the Canadian Group of Painters, the artist often held exhibitions in her home. After she retired from The Study at the age of eighty-three, Seath continued to experiment with different styles and techniques until her death in 1963.

=== Legacy ===
In 1987, Galerie Walter Klinkhoff Inc., Montreal, held an Ethel Seath Retrospective Exhibition.

== Collections ==
Her work is included in the collections of the National Gallery of Canada, the Montreal Museum of Fine Arts and the Art Gallery of Ontario.

== Record sale prices ==
At the Cowley Abbott Spring Live Auction of Important Canadian Art, 2024, Lot #133, St. Sulpice Garden, 1930, oil on board, 16 x 12 in ( 40.6 x 30.5 cm ), Auction Estimate: $40,000.00 - $60,000.00, realized a price of 156,000.00.
