= Edwin Holgate =

Canadian artist (1892–1977)

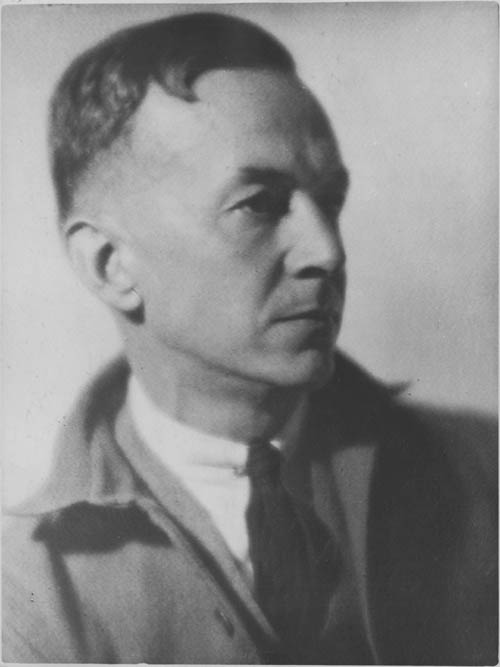
- Edwin Holgate, 1930
- Born: Edwin Headley Holgate; August 19, 1892; Allandale, Ontario, Canada
- Died: May 21, 1977 (aged 84); Montreal, Quebec, Canada
- Known for: painter and engraver
- Spouse: Mary Frances Rittenhouse (m. 1920)
- Awards: Art Association of Montreal's Jessie Dow Prize (1938)

Edwin Headley Holgate RCA (August 19, 1892 – May 21, 1977), was a Canadian painter, muralist, and printmaker. Holgate played a major role in Montreal's art community, and the Montreal Museum of Fine Arts, where he both studied and taught. He was known primarily as a portraitist and for his treatment of the female nude in an outdoor setting in a series of paintings and prints during the 1930s.

== Life and career ==
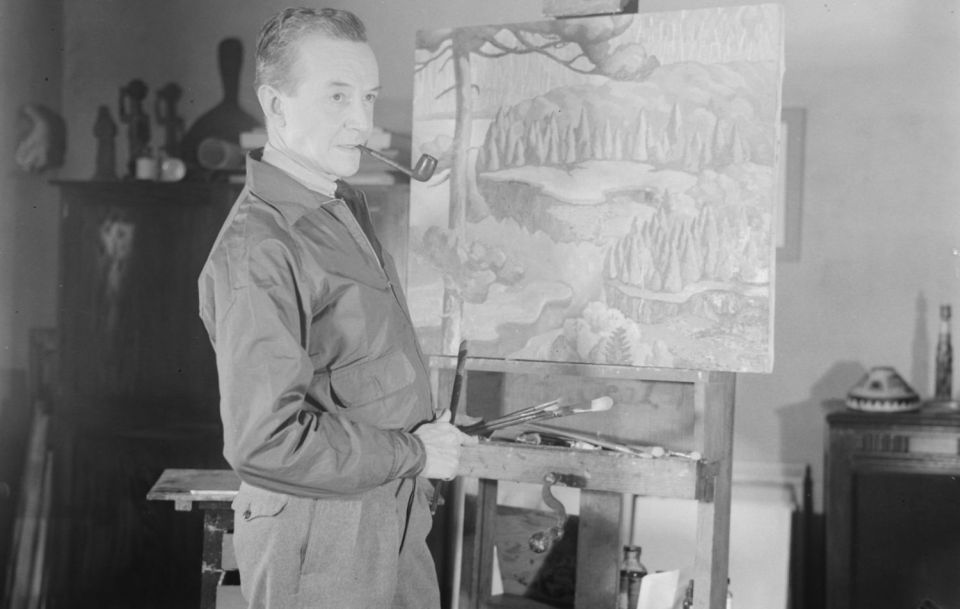
Edwin Holgate painting in his workshop, Montreal, 1940

Holgate was born in Allandale, Ontario, Canada, the son of Bessie Bell (Headley) and Henry Holgate. Holgate's family moved to Jamaica in 1895 where his father worked as an engineer. In 1897, he was sent to Toronto to go to school. In 1901, his family returned from Jamaica and settled in Montreal.

Holgate studied at the Art Association of Montreal with Alberta Cleland (beginning in 1905), William Brymner (who also taught A. Y. Jackson), and later Maurice Cullen. From 1912 until 1923, he exhibited in the annual Spring Exhibitions almost every year. From 1912 to 1914, he studied in Paris at the Académie de la Grande Chaumière but found it disappointing. He was travelling in Ukraine at the outset of World War I, and was forced to cross Asia to return to Canada. He enlisted in 1916 and returned to France with the Canadian Army.

Holgate's first exhibition was held at the Arts Club of Montreal in 1922. In 1933, he had a solo exhibition at the Montreal Museum of Fine Arts. He taught wood engraving at the École des Beaux-Arts de Montréal from 1928 to 1934, then with Lilias Torrance Newton directed art classes at the museum from 1934 to 1936 and again, from 1938 to 1940.

Holgate was said by A. Y. Jackson to be the instigator of the Beaver Hall Group, of which he was a member, in 1920. He was the eighth member of the Group of Seven — he was invited to join the group in March 1929 and showed with it in 1930 and 1931. In 1934, he was elected an associate of the Royal Canadian Academy of Arts. He was elected a full member in 1935. He resigned in 1945 but was reinstated in 1953. He was also a founding member of the Canadian Group of Painters.

Holgate worked as an official Canadian war artist with the Royal Canadian Air Force in England during World War II. On his return to Montreal after the war, he found that the arts scene had changed, with the arrival of the Automatistes. He left Montreal to live in the Laurentians in 1946. In 1954, he was one of 18 Canadian artists commissioned by the Canadian Pacific Railway to paint a mural for the interior of one of the new Park cars entering service on the new Canadian transcontinental train. Each the murals depicted a different national or provincial park; Holgate's was Mont-Tremblant National Park.

Holgate died in 1977 and was buried at Mount Royal Cemetery in Montreal.

The National Gallery of Canada held a retrospective of his work which travelled across Canada in 1975. The Montreal Museum of Fine Arts organized a second retrospective in 2005, curated by Rosalind Pepall and Brian Foss. In 2024, the Museum of Fine Arts Boston displayed his prints in Edwin Holgate as Printmaker.

== Notes ==
=== Bibliography ===
- Harper, Russell. Painting in Canada: A History 2nd ed. Toronto: University of Toronto Press, 1981. ISBN 0-8020-6307-1
- Pepall, Rosalind; Foss, Brian (2005). "Edwin Holgate". Montreal: Montreal Museum of Fine Arts.
- Reid, Dennis A Concise History of Canadian Painting 2nd Edition. Toronto: Oxford University Press, 1988. ISBN 0-19-540663-X.
