= W. P. Weston =

Canadian artist (1879-1967)

- Born: William Percival (Percy) Weston; 30 November 1879; Battersea, London, England
- Died: 20 December 1967 (aged 88); New Westminster, British Columbia
- Education: Trained as a teacher at the Battersea Pupil-Teacher Centre and the Borough Teacher Training College in London, England and as an artist at the Putney School of Art in London

W. P. Weston (November 30, 1879 – December 12, 1967), also known as William Percival (Percy) Weston, was a painter and printmaker, best known for his landscapes of British Columbia, and as a teacher.

== Career ==
Weston was born in Battersea, London, England and trained as a teacher at the Battersea Pupil-Teacher Centre and the Borough Teacher Training College in London, England and as an artist at the Putney School of Art in London. He immigrated to Canada in 1909 and settled in Vancouver, British Columbia. He accepted the position of art teacher at King Edward High School in 1909 and in 1914, was appointed Art Master of the Provincial Normal School. He taught until 1946 when he retired and devoted himself to painting full-time. Throughout all his teaching positions, he emphasized the importance of drawing and on his frequent sketching trips to coastal British Columbia applied his knowledge.

In the 1920s, Weston began to paint landscape in a linear, decorative style and simplified his composition, reducing detail, and introducing solidly molded and sculptural form, influenced possibly by Japanese art and the Group of Seven. An exhibition of his work was held at the Vancouver Art Gallery in 1946 and a retrospective titled Fifty Years of Painting in B.C., marking the 50th anniversary of Weston's arrival in British Columbia, in 1959, along with one-man shows at the Victoria Arts Centre, Coste House in Calgary, the Vancouver Arts Club, and the Richmond Art Gallery. In 1993, the Richmond Art Gallery organized the exhibition titled Silence and Solitude: The Art of W.P. Weston.

He was an important member of the local art community and an admirer of Emily Carr with whom he corresponded. In 1910, he joined the British Columbia Society of Fine Art, became president twice (1922–1926, 1931–1937) and was made a Life Member in 1948. In 1933, he was a charter member of the Canadian Group of Painters. In 1936, Weston was elected an Associate of the Royal Canadian Academy of Arts, then in 1938, was appointed to the Royal Society of Artists, London. He also was a founding member of the Federation of Canadian Artists in 1941. In 1948, he became a member of the Western Group of Painters.

Weston's work is in public collections such as the National Gallery of Canada, the Art Gallery of Ontario, the Vancouver Art Gallery, the University of Toronto Art Museum and the University of British Columbia.

== Publications ==
In 1924, Weston co-authored The Teacher’s Manual of Drawing and Design for Elementary and High Schools, which he revised in 1933. These books became standard texts in Manitoba and British Columbia. Weston also revised the curriculum for British Columbia's Department of Education.

== Record sale prices ==
At the Heffel Auction, Canadian, Impressionist & Modern Art, 20 Nov. 2024, Lot 120, Howe Sound—Yesterday, Today and Forever (1927), oil on canvas, 42 3/8 x 48 1/2 in, 107.6 x 123.2 cm, ESTIMATE: $50,000 - $80,000 CAD, Sold for: $241,250.
