= Bess Larkin Housser Harris =

Canadian painter

- Born: Bess Larkin; 1890; Brandon, Manitoba, Canada
- Died: 1969 (aged 78–79); Vancouver, Canada
- Known for: Painter
- Spouses: F. B. Housser (m. 1914–1934) Lawren Harris (m. 1934)

Bess Larkin Housser Harris (1890–1969) was a Canadian painter who participated in Group of Seven exhibitions and was a member of the Canadian Group of Painters.

== Biography ==
Bess Larkin was born in Brandon, Manitoba. She attended Havergal College in Toronto, Ontario. Bess married F. B. Housser in 1914. The two eventually divorced due to personal differences, and in 1934 Bess married Lawren Harris. After her marriage to Lawren Harris the two spent time in the United States. In 1940, they moved to Vancouver, British Columbia.

Harris did not have a formal art education, but she did take painting lessons from Frederick Varley. Throughout the 1920s she participated, when invited, to Group of Seven shows. In 1926, Harris participated in the Wembley show in England, and in 1930 her work was shown at the Corcoran Gallery of Art in Washington, DC. She was a member of the Canadian Group of Painters.

Harris contributed articles about art to the Canadian Bookman between 1923 and 1926.

Harris died in 1969 in Vancouver. Her work is in the collection of the Robert McLaughlin Gallery, Oshawa.

== Record sale prices ==
At the Heffel Auction, Canadian, Impressionist & Modern Art, Nov. 2024, LOT 113, Near Moraine Lake, oil on canvas, 44 x 54 3/4 in, 111.8 x 139.1 cm, Estimate: $50,000 – $70,000 CAD, Sold for: $133,250 (including Buyer's Premium).
