= Charles C. Hill =

Canadian curator (born 1945)

- Born: Charles Christie Hill; 25 October 1945 (age 80); Ottawa, Ontario
- Known for: curator of historical Canadian Art
- Partner: Brian Foss
- Awards: member of the Order of Canada (2001); honorary doctorate from Concordia University in Montreal (2002)

Charles Christie Hill, CM (born 25 October 1945) is a Canadian curator and writer, well known for his exhibitions of historical Canadian art and major catalogues on the Group of Seven, Canadian Art in the 1930s, and Emily Carr. In his 47-year duration at the National Gallery of Canada (he retired in 2014), he has acted as an invaluable resource to students of historical Canadian art. In addition, he has played a key role in making the Gallery's Canadian art library and archives a key centre of research. In Canadian art what may be referred to as the Charles C. Hill brand of exhibition cataloguing offers rich resource material beyond the scholarly essays.

== Early life ==
Charlie Hill`s family has been associated with Ottawa since early Bytown days and he was born and grew up there. He left Ottawa in 1963 to attend McGill University in Montreal where he obtained his BA in Fine Arts and French Literature in 1966, then went to Toronto where he obtained his MA in the History of Art at the University of Toronto (1969). However, his life and career mainly have been in Ottawa since 1967 when he began to work at the National Gallery of Canada as a summer student.

== Career ==
After working as a lecturer at the Ontario College of Art in Toronto, teaching the history of Canadian art (1970–1971), he was hired by the National Gallery of Canada to work in the library, then as the assistant curator of Post-Confederation art in 1972. In 1980, he was made the National Gallery curator of the permanent collection of Canadian art up to 1970, in charge of its care, installation and development.

In his work as a curator, he organized such important, ground-breaking exhibitions accompanied by major book catalogues as Canadian Painting in the 30s (1975), Morrice A Gift to the Nation The G. Blair Laing Collection (1992); The Group of Seven: Art for a Nation (1995), (with Dennis Reid) Tom Thomson, (2002), (with Johanne Lamoureaux and others) Emily Carr: New Perspectives on a Canadian Icon (2006), and Artists, Architects and Artisans 1890–1918 (2013) as well as co-authoring with Pierre B. Landry Catalogue of the National Gallery of Canada Ottawa Canadian Art Volume One A – F. Among his other shows are To Found a National Gallery: the Royal Canadian Academy of Arts, 1880–1919 (1980). He also lectured widely on his exhibitions. In 1920, the National Gallery of Canada Review published his article titled "Portraits of Canadian Artists, Architects, and Writers: The Photographs of Edmond Dyonnet, 1891–1915".

Hill counts among his major acquisitions Emily Carr's The Welcome Man, the gift of Bryan Adams, and Charles Comfort's The Romance of Nickle, given by Natural Resources Canada. He had been at the National Gallery 47 years when he retired in 2014.

In 2001, he was made a member of the Order of Canada. He received an honorary doctorate from Concordia University in Montreal in 2002.

== Personal life ==
He was the first president of the University of the Toronto Homophile Association (1969), was a co-organizer of the first large-scale gay rights demonstration in Canada, We Demand (1972), and became president of Gays of Ottawa the same year, until 1975. His portrait hangs in the National Portrait Collection of The ArQuives.

His long-term partner is Brian Foss, professor of art history and until 2021 director of Carleton University's School for Studies in Art and Culture.
