= Beaver Hall Group =

Anglo-Quebecois group of artists

The Beaver Hall Group refers to a Montreal-based group of Canadian painters who met in the late 1910s while studying art at a school run by the Art Association of Montreal. The Group is notable for its equal inclusion of men and women artists, as well as for its embrace of Jazz Age modernism. They painted a variety of subjects, including portraits, landscapes, urban scenes and still lifes, in a mix of Modernist and traditional styles.

== Members ==
The ten female artists who were part of the Beaver Hall Group are:

- Nora Collyer
- Emily Coonan
- Prudence Heward (Although she never showed in any of the group's exhibitions and was not an official member, she was allied with them in her aesthetic aims and through friendships, including with Mabel Lockerby and Sarah Robertson.)
- Mabel Lockerby
- Mabel May
- Kathleen Morris
- Lilias Torrance Newton
- Sarah Robertson
- Anne Savage
- Ethel Seath

All ten of the group's participants had studied with William Brymner (1855–1925), a prominent Canadian artist who encouraged them to explore new modernistic approaches to painting. In an era when women artists were viewed as little more than hobbyists and were left out of the mainstream world of professional art, the Beaver Hall Group was the first Canadian artists association in which women played a central role. Importantly, they not only painted but also exhibited and sold their work. Most of the women affiliated with the Beaver Hall Group chose to remain unmarried.

However, a touring exhibition at the Montreal Museum of Fine Arts titled 1920s Modernism in Montreal: The Beaver Hall Group, in 2015, co-curated by Brian Foss and Jacques Des Rochers, has changed the perception of the group to a new realization of the group's activities and all its artist members or those who were closely associated with the group.

== History ==
The group was formally founded in May 1920, inaugurated through the efforts of Randolph Stanley Hewton, Edwin Holgate, Mabel May and Lilias Torrance Newton. The group's name derives from 305 Beaver Hall Hill, the location of the downtown Montreal studio where its members shared space. It counted among the founding members eleven men and eight women. In addition to Hewton, Holgate, May and Newton, original members included Mabel Lockerby, Anne Savage, Albert H. Robinson and President of the group, A.Y. Jackson.

The first Beaver Hall exhibition took place January 17, 1921. In his opening speech, Jackson emphasized the right of the artist to paint what they feel "with utter disregard for what has hitherto been considered requisite to the acceptance of the work at the recognized art exhibitions in Canadian centres. 'Schools' and 'isms' do not trouble us," Jackson stressed, "individual expression is our chief concern". He identified its goals as being those of the Group of Seven, and over the years Jackson maintained the contact between Toronto and Montreal, supporting and stimulating the Montreal artists through regular visits and correspondence. He kept them informed of events in Toronto and arranged for their works to be included in the Group of Seven exhibitions. Both the Montreal Gazette and La Presse gave generous coverage to the vernissage.

The association only survived for three years, during which time they held only four exhibitions with many different artists exhibiting among them. In 1924, the Beaver Hall Group gave up their rented studio but maintained their working studios at home. Many of the women from the Beaver Hall Group exhibited with the all-male Group of Seven internationally. When the Group of Seven formally disbanded in 1932, the women of the Beaver Hall Group helped establish the Canadian Group of Painters in 1933, to provide exhibition opportunities. Nevertheless, Group artists maintained an informal association into the early 1960s.

The current understanding of the Beaver Hall Group as a group of Montreal-based women painters can be traced back to Norah McCullough's (National Gallery of Canada liaison to Western Canada) 1966 traveling exhibition "The Beaver Hall Hill Group". Until that time, the ten women who had continued their informal network after the disbanding of the formal Beaver Hall Group had not had a name for their association. McCollough's aim was to expose the talent of Quebec's women artists to western Canada. Anne Savage and A.Y. Jackson had told her about the original Beaver Hall Group and the name of the group became somehow confused with the name of the street, which is how the exhibition got its name.

More recently, curators have discovered a new dimension of Canadian modernism in the Beaver Hall Group. In contrast to the familiar modernist icons of the Toronto-based Group of Seven, the Montreal Beaver Hall painters were occupied with distinctly urban subjects: industry, fashion, and city life. Commenting on a recent exhibition, 1920s Modernism in Montreal: The Beaver Hall Group at the Montreal Museum of Fine Arts, co-curator Brian Foss said, "As fascinating and important as the Group of Seven was, it wasn't the only word on Canadian Modernism. Hopefully visitors will be struck by the extraordinary vibrancy, diversity and sheer quality of the art, and will come away with enhanced admiration for the real contributions Montreal artists made to Modernist art in this country."
