= Canadian Group of Painters =

Artist collective founded 1933

The Canadian Group of Painters (CGP) was a collective of 28 painters from across Canada who came together as a group in 1933. Its Archives are located at the Robert McLaughlin Gallery in Oshawa, Ontario.

== Formation ==
The Canadian Group of Painters succeeded the disbanded Group of Seven, whose modernist paintings of the Canadian north land had been a strong influence on Canadian art. In the early 1930s, the Group of Seven's prominence had caused controversy as many believed that the National Gallery of Canada exhibited favouritism for their work and they were the only Canadian artists to receive global recognition. Concern over the Gallery's potential bias and exclusion of modern artists led to the formation of the Canadian Group of Painters in February 1933.

The group was made up of 28 different English-speaking painters from across Canada with Lawren Harris as their inaugural president. Several of the other Group of Seven painters were also included in the new group including A. J. Casson, Arthur Lismer, A. Y. Jackson, F.H. Varley and Franklin Carmichael.

Although the group never created a manifesto, they lived and worked with two objectives: to foster closer cooperation between Canadian artists and to encourage and cultivate Canadian artistic expression.

== History ==
Their first exhibition of "nationalist art" was held in Atlantic City, New Jersey in November 1933. They showcased 57 works at the Heinz Art Salon, which proved to be a great international venue to showcase their brand. However, the pieces that gained the most recognition and press were still the Group of Seven works. The first CGP exhibition in Canada was held in November 1933. The exhibit was less restrictive in style and featured a wider range of works that fell outside of the Canadian landscape style.

Their next exhibition was not held until January 1936 at the Art Gallery of Toronto. The significant delay was caused by a variety of scandals between group members, including an affair between Lawren Harris and Bess Larkin Housser, fellow artist and the wife of CGP's secretary, Fred Housser. Harris stepped down as president and A. Y. Jackson took the lead with vice presidents Arthur Lismer and Prudence Heward in 1936. The group held a number of exhibitions under their new leadership and were making strides towards a unified style.

The Eastern Group of Painters was formed in Montreal, Quebec in 1938 to counteract the influence of the Canadian Group of Painters.

== Influence ==
As active painters and as a group they continued to produce and influence Canadian art for many years. The Canadian Group of Painters organized exhibitions of the works of the Beaver Hall Group. Jock Macdonald, who was a founding member of the Canadian Group of Painters, was also a founding member of Painters Eleven.

A Vital Force: The Canadian Group of Painters (CGP) (2013), which was curated by Alicia Boutilier for the Agnes Etherington Art Centre, was the first major touring exhibition to focus exclusively on the CGP in an exhibition of major paintings from public and private collections across Canada. The Canadian Group of Painters Up Close is a film of a talk given during 2013 which focuses on four painters in the show.

== Members ==
=== 1933 founding members ===
- Bertram Brooker
- Franklin Carmichael
- Emily Carr
- A.J. Casson
- Charles Comfort
- L.L. FitzGerald
- Bess Harris
- Lawren Harris
- Prudence Heward
- Randolph S. Hewton
- Edwin Holgate
- Yvonne McKague Housser
- A.Y. Jackson
- Arthur Lismer
- Jock Macdonald
- Thoreau MacDonald
- H. Mabel May
- Isabel McLaughlin
- Lilias Torrance Newton
- Will Ogilvie
- George Pepper
- Sarah Robertson
- Albert H. Robinson
- Anne Savage
- Charles H. Scott
- F. H. Varley
- W. P. Weston
- W. J. Wood

=== 1935–1940 additions ===
- André Charles Biéler
- John Martin Alfsen
- Paraskeva Clark
- Rody Kenny Courtice
- Bobs Cogill Haworth
- Pegi Nicol MacLeod
- Kathleen Daly
- Carl Schaefer
- Gordon Webber
- Caven Atkins
- Peter Haworth
- Jack Humphrey
- Mabel Lockerby
- Henri Masson
- David Milne
- Kathleen Morris
- Louis Muhlstock
- Ethel Seath

=== 1942–1954 additions ===
- Fritz Brandtner
- Goodridge Roberts
- Marian Dale Scott
- Jack Nichols
- William Winter
- Edna Taçon
- E. Michael Mitchell
- E. J. Hughes
- Jack Bush
- B. C. Binning
- Stanley Cosgrove
- L. A. C. Panton
- Jacques de Tonnancour
- Roloff Beny
- Lionel Thomas

== Select group exhibitions ==
- 1933: Heinz Art Salon, NJ
- 1936: Art Gallery of Ontario
- 1937: Art Gallery of Ontario
- 1937: Art Gallery of Ontario
- 1938: National Gallery of Canada
- 1939: New York World's Fair, NY
- 1940: Art Association of Montreal, QC
- 1951: Montreal Museum of Fine Arts, QC
- 1953: Art Gallery of Ontario
- 1993: Pilgrims in the Wilderness: The Struggle of the Canadian Group of Painters (1933–1969), the Robert McLaughlin Gallery, Oshawa
- 2013: A Vital Force: The Canadian Group of Painters, Agnes Etherington Art Centre, Kingston
