= Alberta Cleland =

Canadian artist and educator

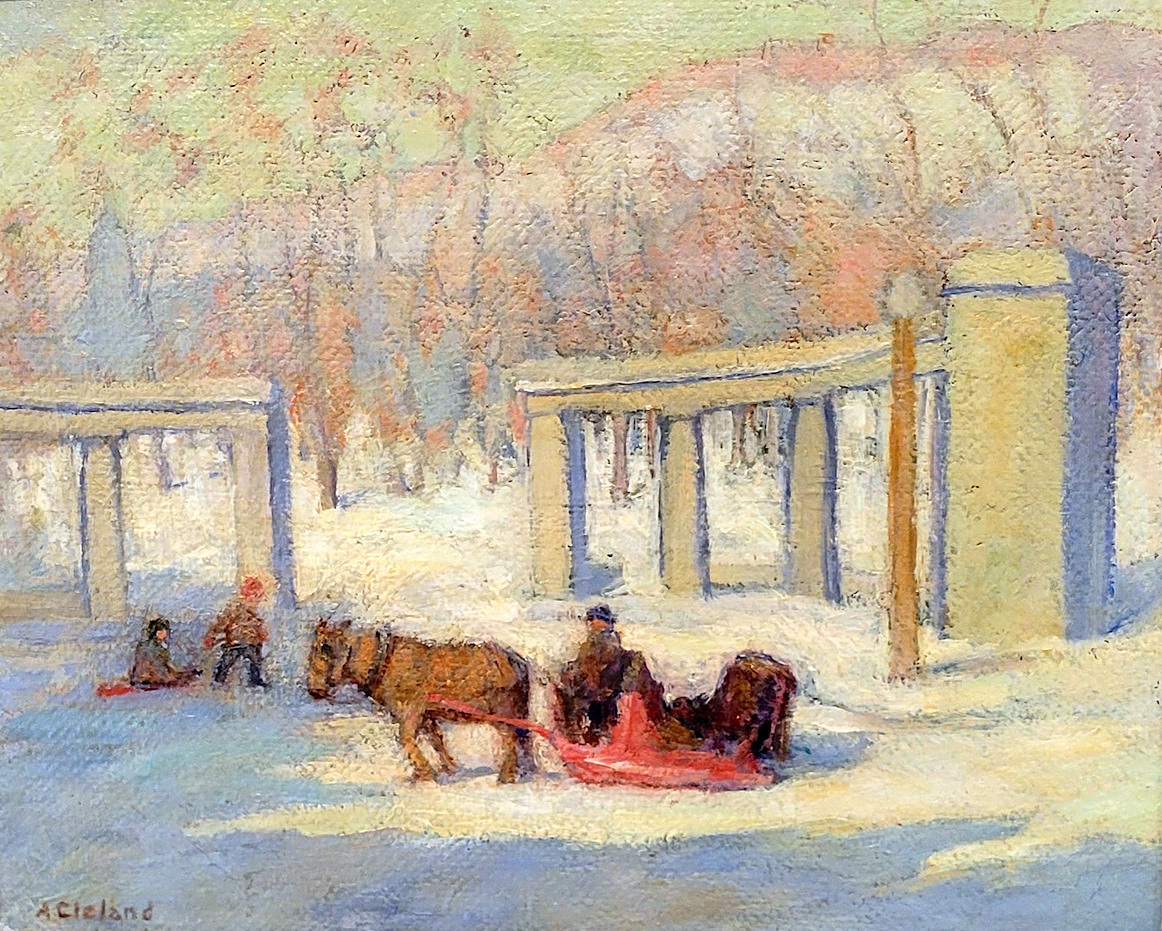
Mary Alberta Cleland (Canadian, 1876-1960) Construction of the McGill gates winter 1925. Oil on canvas, 13 x 15 inches. Private Collection, Toronto. Canadian Impressionism.

Mary Alberta Cleland (August 20, 1876 – February 25, 1960) was a Canadian Impressionist painter and educator.

She was born in Montreal and studied at the Art Association of Montreal. Cleland taught at the Art Association of Montreal alongside William Brymner and Maurice Cullen (artist) from 1898 to 1937. Her works were exhibited at the Montreal Museum of Fine Arts spring exhibitions from 1897 to 1943 and at the Royal Canadian Academy of Arts annual shows from 1899 to 1943.

Her students included Nora Collyer, Edwin Holgate, Helen McNicoll and Marian Scott.

Cleland painted landscapes in oil and watercolour and portraits in pastel.

She died in Montreal at the age of 83.
