= Prudence Heward =

Canadian painter (1896–1947)

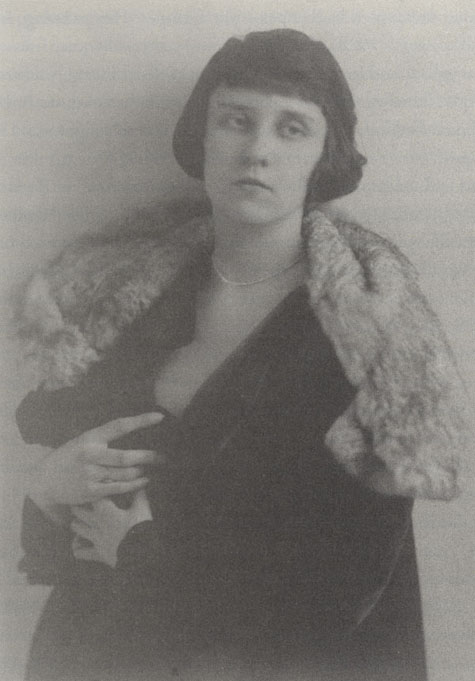
- Prudence Heward
- Born: Efa Prudence Heward; 2 July 1896; Montreal, Quebec
- Died: 19 March 1947 (aged 50)
- Education: Art Association of Montreal
- Known for: painter
- Movement: Expressionism; abstract art; Beaver Hall Hill Group.

Prudence Heward (July 2, 1896 – March 19, 1947) was a Canadian figure painter, known for using acidic colour, a sculptural treatment, and giving an intense brooding quality to her subjects. She was a charter member of the Canadian Group of Painters, the Contemporary Arts Society and the Federation of Canadian Artists. Although she did not show her work with the Beaver Hall Group, she was allied with many of its artists in her aesthetic aims and through friendships.

== Biography ==
Born Efa Prudence Heward in Montreal, Heward was the sixth of eight children and was educated at private schools. She showed an interest in art at a young age, possibly encouraged by her artistically-inclined mother and sister Dorothy, and started drawing lessons at age twelve at the Art Association of Montreal school with William Brymner and Maurice Cullen.

During World War I, Heward lived in England where her brothers served in the Canadian Army while she served as a volunteer with the Red Cross. Returning to Canada at war's end, she continued her painting, studying at the Art Association of Montreal. As a student in the advanced class, in 1924, she won the Women's Art Society Prize for painting and her work was given its first public showing at the Royal Canadian Academy of Arts in Toronto, Ontario. However, it was still an era when women artists were given little credibility and it wasn't until 1932 that Heward's first solo exhibition came at the W. Scott & Sons Gallery in Montreal.

Wanting to refine her skills, and drawn to the great gathering of creative genius in the Montparnasse Quarter of Paris, France, between 1925 and 1926 Prudence Heward lived and painted in Paris. While studying at the Académie Colarossi, she frequented Le Dome Café in Montparnasse, the favorite haunt of North American writers and artists and the place where Canadian writer Morley Callaghan came with his friends Ernest Hemingway and F. Scott Fitzgerald. In 1929, in Paris, Heward met Ontario painter Isabel McLaughlin with whom she became friends and upon her return to Canada, would join with her and other artists on nature painting trips. In the same year 1929 her career got a major boost when her painting, Girl on a Hill, won the top prize in the Governor General Willingdon competition organized by the National Gallery of Canada.

She was invited to exhibit with the Group of Seven and through it became friends with A. Y. Jackson with whom she would go on sketching excursions along the Saint Lawrence River. She did a number of landscapes, with a particular attachment for Quebec's Eastern Townships.

She joined the executive committee of "The Atelier: A School of Drawing Painting Sculpture" in 1931. During the Second World War she designed war posters. In 1933, Prudence Heward was a charter member of the Canadian Group of Painters, but her struggle with asthma and other health problems eventually slowed her down. A 1939 automobile accident curtailed her abilities further but she still produced some outstanding portraits until 1945 when her health had deteriorated to the point where she had to give up painting. She died two years later, while seeking medical treatment in Los Angeles, California.

== Work ==
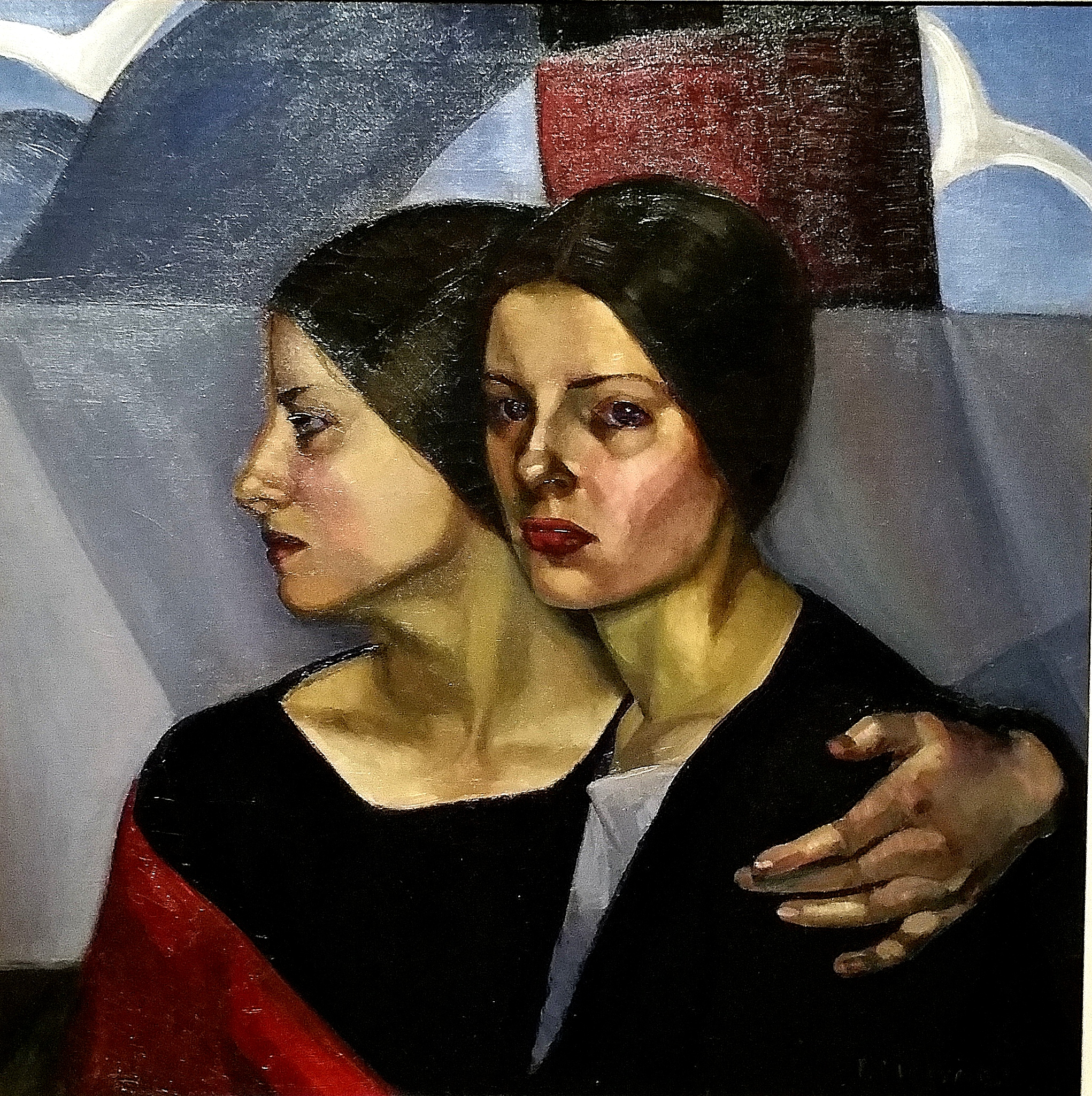
The Immigrants, Prudence Heward, 1929, Private Collection, Toronto

Though Heward also painted landscapes and still lifes, she was primarily a painter of human subjects. As Julia Skelly points out in Prudence Heward: Life & Work, Heward preferred the term "figures" to portraits, and most of her figurative paintings are of women who often return the viewer's gaze, and who are "realistically rendered rather than unrealistically idealized". These include nude subjects which was sometimes controversial in the 1930s. Art historian Charmaine Nelson has critically examined Heward’s depictions of black women she painted.

Her work was influenced by schools of European modernism and her application of these principles and styles was more than merely formal. They provided her "with a dynamic visual vocabulary for depicting modern Canadian women in both rural and urban contexts".

Works by Prudence Heward can be found in the collections of several Canadian galleries including the Winnipeg Art Gallery, the Montréal Museum of Fine Arts, the Musée national des beaux-arts du Québec, the Robert McLaughlin Gallery in Oshawa and the National Gallery of Canada.

== After her death ==
In the year after her death in 1947 a memorial touring exhibition with 102 works was shown at the National Gallery of Canada. In 1996, her cousin, politician Heward Grafftey, wrote "Chapter Four: Prudence Heward" for the book Portraits of a Life. By Woman's Hand (1994), a National Film Board documentary film by Pepita Ferrari, examines her life and that of two fellow painters, Anne Savage and Sarah Robertson.

On July 2, 2010, Canada Post released a commemorative stamp and a souvenir sheet in honour of Heward as part of its Art Canada collection. The two paintings featured were At the Theatre (1928) and Rollande (1929).

In 2021, the McMichael Canadian Art Collection organized Uninvited: Canadian Women Artists in the Modern Moment and included eight of her paintings. In 2025, Art Windsor-Essex included her work in a show of painting about sport, called Game On.
