= Brian Foss (art historian) =

Canadian academic (born 1955)

- Born: Brian Frederick Foss; 1955 (age 70–71); Aklavik (Northwest Territories)
- Known for: academic, art historian, writer, curator
- Partner: Charles C. Hill

Brian Frederick Foss (born 1955) is a Canadian art historian, academic, curator, and writer who specializes in the art history of Canada and British war art, especially of the late 19th and early 20th centuries. Some of the works Foss and partners in relation. these subjects have gained some notoriety. Receiving prizes for their commendable work.

== Career ==
Foss was born in Aklavik, Northwest Territories and grew up in Winnipeg. He received his BA Honours in History from the University of Winnipeg (1979), his MA in Canadian Art History from Concordia University, Montreal (1985), and his PhD in the History of Art from University College at the University of London (1991). From 1982, he taught art history in Montreal including in the Department of Art History at Concordia University (1988-2009; Full Professor from 2004), where he was also Associate Dean in the Faculty of Fine Arts (2002-2006, 2007-2009). In 2009 he became Professor of Art History, and Director of the School for Studies in Art and Culture (2009-2021), at Carleton University. From 2014 to 2015, he was the Craig Dobbin Visiting Professor of Canadian Studies, University College Dublin, Ireland. In addition to teaching, he has supervised M.A. and Ph.D. theses in the area of Canadian art history as well as commenting on radio on Canadian art.

== Writing ==
Foss organized, co-organized or contributed essays to exhibitions on the art of Robert Harris (1991), Molly Lamb Bobak (1993), Miller Brittain (1998), Mary Hiester Reid (2000), and Edwin Holgate (2005), and has curated exhibitions on a broad range of subjects from the growth of the modern city to the development of art collections. He was the co-editor of The Visual Arts in Canada: The Twentieth Century (Oxford University Press, 2010) for which he also wrote the chapter on "Into the New Century: Painting, 1890-1914", and is author of the e-book Homer Watson: Life and Work (Art Canada Institute, 2018). With Jacques Des Rochers of the Musée des Beaux-Arts de Montréal he co-organized the monumental exhibition 1920s Modernism in Montreal: The Beaver Hall Group (2015), which took its curators ten years to put together, and which the Globe and Mail said dispelled the mythology surrounding the group and placed the artists in their proper context. He also wrote for the Beaver Hall exhibition catalogue the chapter on "Out on the Town: Modernism, Arts and Entertainment in Montreal, 1920-1933" and was featured in the CBC 1 documentary on the show.

His book War Paint: Art, War, State and Identity in Britain 1939-45 was published by Yale University Press (2007) and was one of the five books shortlisted for that year’s international William M.B. Berger prize for British Art History. He has had a long involvement with the Journal of Canadian Art History and as a member of the editorial team of RACAR (Revue d’art Canadian / Canadian Art Review).

In 2025, Foss wrote George Agnew Reid: Life & Work for the Art Canada Institute. This is the first publication to present a thorough analysis of Reid's career.

== Awards ==
- 2003: Distinguished Teaching Award, Faculty of Fine Arts, Concordia University, Montreal.
- 2013: Universities Art Association of Canada Award for service to the UAAC and for commitment to Art History.
- 2016: (with co-curator Jacques Des Rochers) 1920s Modernism in Montreal: The Beaver Hall Group (2015) won the Award of Outstanding Achievement for an Art Exhibition from the Canadian Museums Association, while the accompanying catalogue won the Prix d'excellence for exhibition catalogues from the Société des Musées Québécois, and the Melva J. Dwyer Award from the Art Libraries Society of North America.
- 2022-2027: Chancellor’s Professor, Carleton University, Ottawa.
