= Mabel Lockerby =

Canadian painter (1882–1976)

- Born: Mabel Irene Lockerby; March 13, 1882; Montreal, Quebec
- Died: May 1, 1976 (aged 94); Montreal, Quebec
- Education: Art Association of Montreal with William Brymner and Maurice Cullen
- Movement: Beaver Hall Group
- Elected: Canadian Group of Painters (1939); Contemporary Arts Society, Montreal

Mabel Irene Lockerby (March 13, 1882 – May 1, 1976) was a Canadian artist.

== Career ==
Lockerby's birth year is sometimes attributed as 1887 from her own curriculum vitae but she was actually born in 1882. She was born in Montreal to Alexander Lockerby, a grocer, and Barbara Cox and had seven siblings, of whom four survived to adulthood. According to the family bible, the family grew up in a number of houses on MacKay street in Montreal.

She studied at the Art Association of Montreal with William Brymner and Maurice Cullen winning two awards, one for her drawing in the "antique class" (1902) and another for composition (1911). In 1914, she began to exhibit in the annual Spring Exhibition at the Association and continued to paint throughout the First World War.

She was a member of the Beaver Hall Group. She exhibited regularly with the group and in 1926 the National Gallery of Canada purchased one of her works. She joined the Canadian Group of Painters in 1939 and was a member of the Contemporary Arts Society of Montreal. Her work was exhibited in the British Empire Exhibition at Wembley Park, Wembley, England in 1924 and 1925, at the 1939 New York World's Fair and at the 400th Anniversary Exhibition in Sao Paulo, Brazil in 1954.

Her painting style is characterized by rich colours, visible brushstrokes and strong sense of design. She primarily painted portraits, still lifes and landscapes with figures. In the 1930s, she incorporated humour and fantasy into her work. The National Gallery of Canada has four of her pieces in their collection, including her painting Early Winter. Her work is also in the collections at the Art Gallery of Ontario and the Art Gallery of Hamilton.

Lockerby died in Montreal at the age of 94 after suffering a stroke a few months earlier.
