= Emily Coonan =

Canadian painter

- Born: Emily Geraldine Coonan; March 25, 1885
- Died: June 23, 1971 (aged 86); Montreal, Quebec, Canada
- Education: Conseil des arts et manufactures, Montreal (1898); Art Association of Montreal with William Brymner (1905-1909)
- Known for: Figure painter
- Movement: Beaver Hall Group, 1921
- Awards: first artist to receive travel grant from the National Gallery of Canada; Women`s Art Society scholarship (1916)

Emily Coonan (25 March 1885 – 23 June 1971) was a Canadian impressionist and post-impressionist painter, born in the Pointe-Saint-Charles area of Montreal. As a member of the Beaver Hall Group, Coonan mostly did figure paintings. Influenced by William Brymner and James Wilson Morrice in early years and later on by work done in Europe, Coonan's work has features that are related both to impressionism and modernism.

== Early life ==
The daughter of William Coonan, a machinist for the Grand Trunk Railway, and Mary Anne Fullerton, she was born in the Pointe-Saint-Charles neighbourhood of Montreal and was educated at the nearby St. Ann's Academy for Girls. Emily was encouraged to study art early on when she was enrolled in art classes at the Conseil des Arts & Manufactures around 1898, with the instructors Edmond Dyonnet, Joseph Charles Franchere, Joseph Saint-Charles, and Charles Gill. She then studied at the Art Association of Montreal with William Brymner between 1901 and 1905. Brymner was the primary instructor for the members of the Beaver Hall Group, in which Coonan took part, and he was especially open to her exploration into the styles of impressionism and post-expressionism, while also supporting her development of a more modernist style.

== Artistic career ==
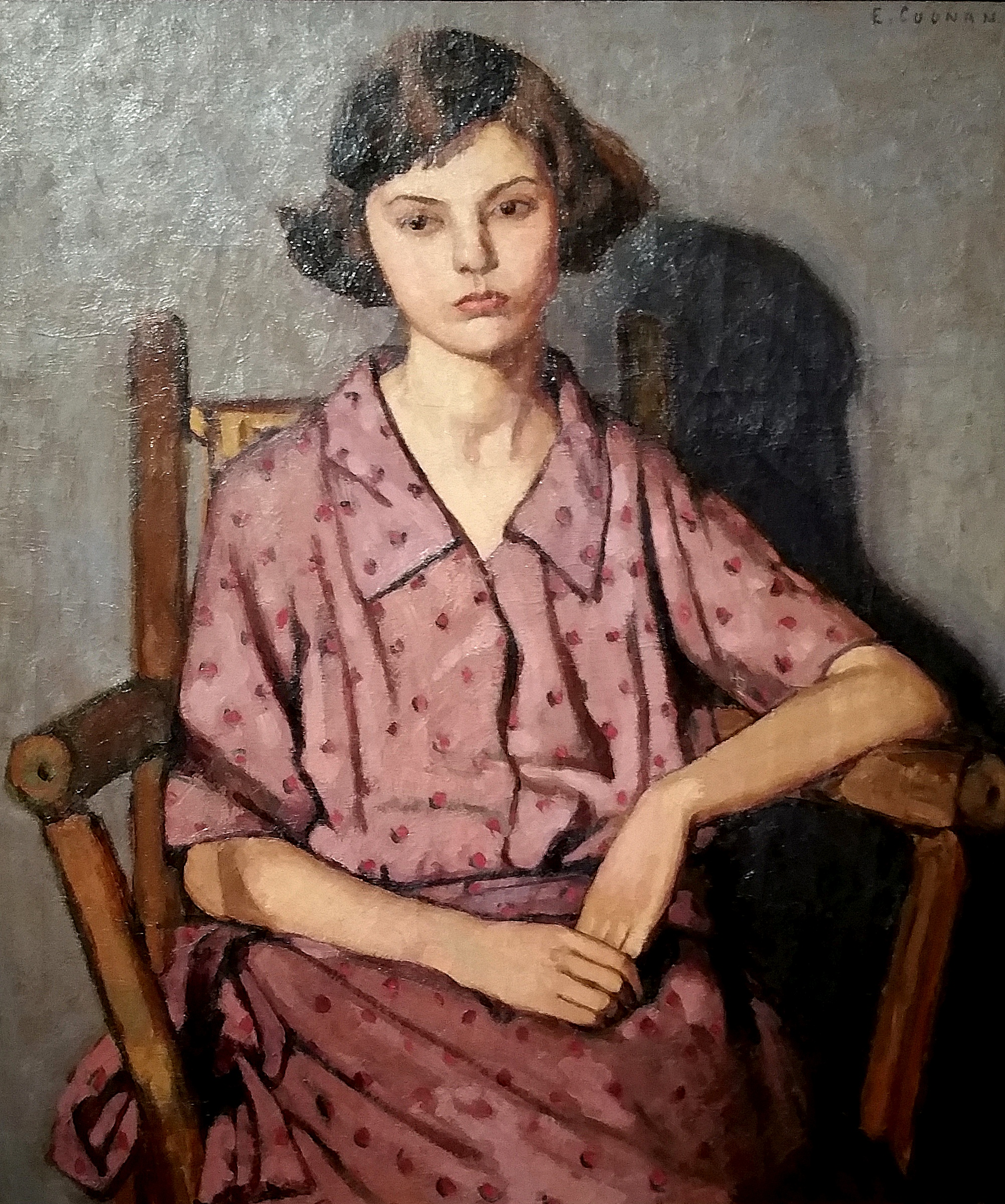
Girl in Dotted Dress, 1923

In 1907, once enrolled into the Art Association of Montreal, Coonan started exhibiting her work in the institute, where she would continue to show her work until 1933. Her first award-winning piece, Eva and Daisy (1907), was a figure study of the Coonan sisters, which won her first place in the annual Art Association of Montreal student show of 1907. In 1913, the National Gallery of Canada awarded her with their first travelling bursary, which was a prize that was given to the art student that exemplified the most potential to study and practice in Europe. Due to the onset of the First World War, Coonan's trip was postponed to 1920. During her stay abroad, she started to use a stylized version of European modernism in her work and began creating landscape paintings.

Once she returned to Canada in 1921, she became a member of the Beaver Hall Group. Unlike the other members of the Beaver Hall Group who were members of Montreal's Protestant upper class, Coonan was a devout Roman Catholic from a working-class background. As a member of the Beaver Hall Studios, Coonan participated in a few of the four shows that the group put on before the group went their separate ways in 1922. Coonan gained international acclaim as her piece Girl in Dotted Dress (1923) was selected to show in the British Empire Exhibition in England. She took inspiration from the French impressionists and James Wilson Morrice. After her instructor, Brymner, died, Coonan created and exhibited fewer works, opting out of participating in the Royal Canadian Academy of Arts spring exhibition and then only taking part in three more spring shows in her life. Although she continued to paint later in life, Coonan stopped participating in public exhibitions after 1933.

== Late life ==
Coonan did not stop painting altogether after 1933, but she ceased to produce for the public sphere. Due to harsh criticism for her progressive style and the death of Brymner, her mentor, and then her father, Coonan painted only for her family and friends for the remainder of her life. Although Coonan never married and preferred to live and work in solitude, the majority of her works represented her close ones. Coonan lived in her childhood home until 1966. She died in 1971 at the age of 86 while living with her niece Patricia Coonan in Montreal.

== Work ==
Curators today praise her coherent and innovative coherent approach.

Coonan's works are included in the collection of the Musée national des beaux-arts du Québec and the National Gallery of Canada.
