= Kathleen Morris =

Canadian painter (1893–1986)

- Kathleen Morris, 1930
- Born: Kathleen Moir Morris; December 2, 1893; Montreal, Quebec, Canada
- Died: December 20, 1986 (aged 93); Rawdon, Quebec, Canada
- Known for: Painter

Kathleen "Kay" Moir Morris RCA (December 2, 1893 – December 20, 1986) was a Canadian painter and although not an official member of the Beaver Hall Group, she often is counted as a member since she was friendly with many of its members and exhibited with them.

== Biography ==
The fourth child and only daughter of Montague John Morris and Eliza Howard Bell, she was born in Montreal, Quebec and was educated there, going on to study for ten years (1907–1917) at the Art Association of Montreal with William Brymner. She also spent two summers under Maurice Cullen at his outdoor sketching classes. Her father died in 1914, the same year she began to exhibit with the Royal Canadian Academy of Arts and the Art Association of Montreal. In the early 1920s, she was associated with the Beaver Hall Group and in 1921 she began to show with the Ontario Society of Artists.

In 1922, Morris went to live with her mother in Ottawa, Ontario. (Note: Morris: "I had a wonderful mother, she would take me off on sketching trips and sit beside me while I painted. But on cold days I would go alone. I couldn’t walk miles, so I would be taken out to paint in a sleigh where I would be dropped off. The snow was so deep that the only place I could paint was in the tracks of the sleigh... But do you know, I was never cold. It was so beautiful.") Eliza Bell was a strong woman with feminist opinions, and encouraged her daughter's involvement in art. Support such as this was significant, as it was a struggle for women at the time to cross the conventional social boundary lines and succeed as an artist. Her mother's cousin, portrait painter Robert Harris also took an active interest in her career. The Beaver Hall Group officially dissolved in 1922, but she participated in their exhibitions while living in Ottawa. She also showed her work abroad. She returned to the Montreal area in 1929 and lived there for the remainder of her life.

Morris became a member of the Royal Canadian Academy of Arts that same year. She took inspiration from the work of James Wilson Morrice while Morrice was also interested in her; he purchased one of her paintings from Watson Art Galleries in Montreal. Her work has been favourably compared to that of A. Y. Jackson and in 1930 she won Honourable mention at the Second Willingdon Arts Competition, placing second to Frederick Varley.

== Style and work ==
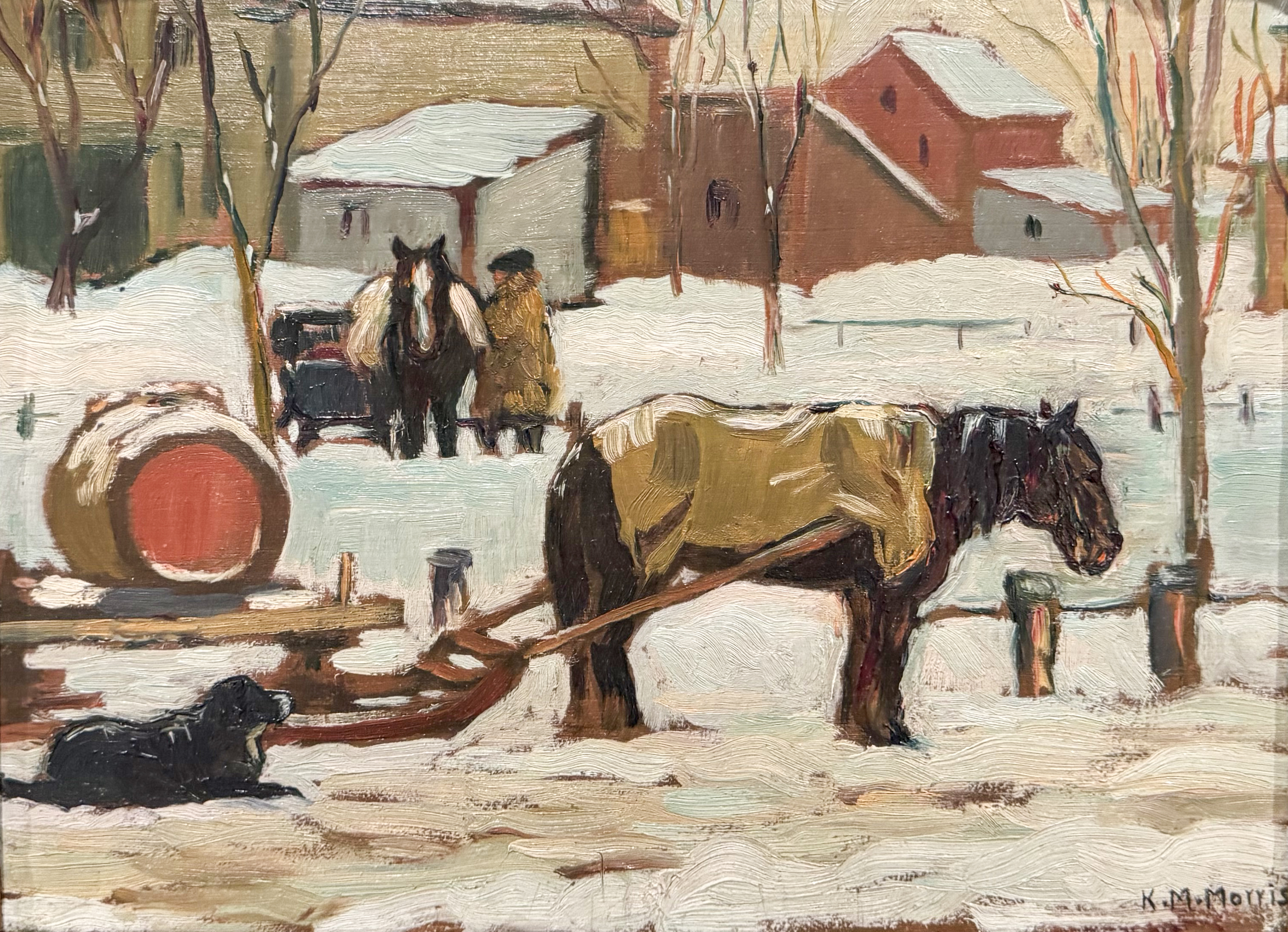
Waiting, 1919

Village Street Scene, 1920

Morris painted scenes of urban and pre-industrial rural Quebec (Note: Morris: "Quebec is the most perfect place to paint. A.Y. Jackson my great friend used to say to me, 'You're so lucky. Everywhere you look there's a painting— a church, a house. I have to go so far to find my pictures’".) not in support of a French Canadian identity but to suggest that the "primitive" could provide a sanctuary from modern life. From the first, deeply textured, strokes of her early works, to the gentle swoops of colour and line in her later landscapes, Morris exhibited a unique style that set her apart from her contemporaries. She painted from sketches, in which she simplified the forms and applied colour in bold, thick patches. Her subject matter reflected her kinship with her surroundings and an appreciation of the simple life. She also felt deeply for the animal world, voicing her concerns publicly to protest the annual seal hunt. Throughout her life, she spent two months of every summer in Marshall's Bay near Arnprior, Ontario, at a small secluded cottage that had been in the family for over a hundred years. There she would paint the fields and sunsets or indulge in her love for animals by painting cows and sheep. (Note: Morris: "I don’t think I showed any evidence of talent until I started drawing horses all over my schoolbooks. I love to paint animals. I think cows are just beautiful but they are awfully hard to paint. They’ve got bumps and lumps. And the flies! They love the smell of paint. They don’t go all over the cows, they go all over you.") However, since exhibitors preferred her town rather than her country scenes, most of her time was spent developing her winter sketches into larger canvases.

"I won a hundred dollars in the Ontario Humane Society Lottery the other day. They, and the International Fund for Animal Welfare, are running a campaign to abolish the Leg Hold Trap in Fredericton, N.B., and I am very interested in that as I think it is the worst thing of all. So sent fifty to one and fifty to the other. I could not have done it otherwise and that was found money. They have done it in England and different parts of the States but I am afraid they will never do it here but the only thing is to try. Think of having your finger caught in a car door for a week or longer and no food or water and to be killed by another animal or a brutal trapper. In these days when they can do such wonderful things they surely could make very nice artificial furs but of course the furriers will fight it tooth and nail. Government should force them to use the trap that kills. The women of course the most to blame."

— Kathleen Morris

Morris's paintings can be compared to the work of Les Nabis, a group of mainly French painters active in the 1890s, whose works were influenced by Paul Gauguin’s expressive use of colour and rhythmic pattern. Like them, Morris translated her surroundings in an intuitive manner, guided by colour more than form, the latter at the service of the former. They resonate with courage, both personal and artistic, and place her in the same category as David Milne. They hover on that edge between reality and the unseen, allowing the eye to complete the image, allowing the one looking into the picture to see into the heart of the artist. Morris painted that way she was, unassuming and yet very present. In his assessment of the Beaver Hall Group exhibition at the 1937 Royal Institute Galleries in London, W.G. Constable singled out Morris as an outstanding example of the second generation of Impressionists. Although few of her paintings are dated and titles are often used more than once, her paintings are nostalgic reminders of a former time.

== Recognition ==
In 1923, the Montreal newspaper La Presse began to take notice of her work. Canadian writer Albert Laberge called it extremely interesting and in 1924 and 1927 her name made it into the headlines of the reviews of the annual Art Association of Montreal spring exhibition. In 1928, one of her paintings of a Quebec fish market was reproduced in the Toronto Telegram newspaper under the title Canadian Art Reaches Peak at R.C.A. Show. Canadian Homes and Gardens magazine also reproduced one of her paintings called Sunday Morning in 1932. In 1980, her painting McGill Cab Stand, 1927 was chosen for a series of Christmas postage stamps by Canada Post.

== Exhibitions ==
Between 1914 and 1940, her work was exhibited regularly with the Beaver Hall Group and the Canadian Group of Painters at the annual Spring Exhibitions with the Art Association of Montreal as well as in annual shows at the Art Gallery of Ontario with the Ontario Society of Artists and the Royal Canadian Academy exhibitions.

She also participated in the following international group shows.

- Canadian Section of Fine Arts, British Empire Exhibition, Wembley, England (1924, 1925)
- First Pan-American Exhibition, 1925
- Exposition d'art canadien, Musée du Jeu de Paume, Paris, France, 1927
- Canadian art at the British Empire Trade Exhibition, Buenos Aires, Argentina, 1931
- Contemporary Canadian Painting circulated in Southern Dominions of British Empire in 1936
- Exhibition of Paintings, Drawings and Sculpture by Artists of the British Empire Overseas, Royal Institute Galleries, London, Eng., 1937
- A Century of Canadian Art, Tate Gallery, London, Eng., 1938
- 1939 New York World's Fair
- Pintura Canadense Contemporanea, Rio de Janeiro, Brazil, 1944
- Canadian Women Artists, Riverside Museum, New York, 1947
- Contemporary Canadian Painting, Canadian Club, New York, 1948
- Festival of Britain, London, 1951

Solo or two-person showings of her work have been held at the Art Association of Montreal in 1939, the Montreal Arts Club in 1956 and 1962, from which Dorothy Pfeiffer noted:

"Kathleen Morris's work appears all of a piece. Her solidly composed souvenirs of Old Montreal and its environs should be collectors' treasures. ...Such painting brings peace to the soul. It is humane, it is technically authoritative, it is the personal expression of the joy of life and of tangible emotion by a gifted, forthright, fearless artist."

In 1983, the Agnes Etherington Art Centre at Queen's University held a retrospective of her work.

=== Collections ===
Morris' work is most notably included in the collections of these galleries and museums.

- Art Gallery of Greater Victoria
- Art Gallery of Hamilton
- Hart House at the University of Toronto
- Montreal Museum of Fine Arts
- Musée national des beaux-arts du Québec
- Corcoran Gallery in Washington
- National Gallery of Canada
- Mackenzie King Museum
- Power Corporation of Canada
- McCord Museum
- Library and Archives Canada
- Embassy of Canada, Paris

== Personal life ==
Morris had cerebral palsy, a congenital disorder of the nervous system, which challenged her physically but could not suppress her joy for life. She never married and after the death of her mother in 1948 she lived with her brother Harold. In 1978, she had a stroke and could no longer paint. She died in Rawdon, Quebec, at the age of 93. Her obituary asked for donations in memoriam to the Society for the Prevention of Cruelty to Animals.
