= Lilias Torrance Newton =

Canadian painter (1896–1980)

- Self-portrait, c. 1929
- Born: Lilias Torrance; November 3, 1896; Lachine, Quebec
- Died: January 10, 1980 (aged 83); Cowansville, Canada
- Known for: Painter
- Spouse: Frederick G. Newton (m. 1921–1933) ending in divorce

Lilias Torrance Newton RCA LL. D. (November 3, 1896 – January 10, 1980) was a Canadian painter and a member of the Beaver Hall Group. She was one of the more important portrait artists in Canada in the 20th century.

== Early life and education ==
Newton was born in Lachine, Quebec, a suburb of Montreal. Her parents, Alice Mary Stewart and Forbes Torrance, were prominent Montreal figures; her father being a member of the Pen and Pencil Club of Montreal. An old sketchbook of her father's is thought to have been her early artistic inspiration. She studied at Miss Edgar's and Miss Cramp's School, where she was taught by Laura Muntz Lyall. She left school at 16 to attend classes given by William Brymner at the Art Association of Montreal, where she won a scholarship in the Life class in her first year. She later studied with Alfred Wolmark in London and Alexandre Jacovleff in Paris.

== Career ==
During the First World War, she worked for the Red Cross in England. In 1922, she won an Honorable Mention at the Paris Salon while studying with Alfred Wolmark (she used the same strong colour schemes as him later).

She was a founding member of the Beaver Hall Group and of the Canadian Group of Painters.

In 1933, at the first show of the Canadian Group of Painters, Newton's Nude in the Studio was removed from the exhibition by the board of the Art Gallery of Toronto (AGO), because it felt that the public would find it shocking since the model wore green, high-heeled shoes. These were taken as evidence that she was too naked to be a nude. The painting was bought by Alice and the Rt. Honourable Vincent Massey, Toronto and Port Hope, Ontario, and in time came to the Thomson collection at the AGO. In an interview, Newton said she was pleased about the rumpus over the painting because it brought her attention. As she said, "everybody I ever knew wanted to come and have a look at it!"

Newton is best known for her portraits, over 300 in her career, including her 1957 portraits of Queen Elizabeth II and Prince Philip. Newton was the first known Canadian commissioned to make a portrait of either subject. Her portraits are said to suggest the psychology of the subject. Like Edwin Holgate, she shows a concern for solid structure derived from Cézanne in her work but she also was interested in Modigliani and André Derain.

Her work is in the collections of the National Gallery of Canada, the Art Gallery of Alberta, the Glenbow Museum, the Art Gallery of Ontario, Hart House at the University of Toronto, the Montreal Museum of Fine Arts, the Musée national des beaux-arts du Québec, the Canadian War Museum, and other public institutions in Canada.

Newton was elected an Associate of the Royal Canadian Academy of Arts in 1923, and became its third female member in 1937. She became an Academician in 1939 and 1973. She also was a member of the Canadian Group of Painters. She taught at her alma mater, the Art Association of Montreal, and received an honorary LL.D. from the University of Toronto.

== Personal life ==
In 1921, she married Frederick G. Newton, and had a child. She divorced in 1933. Newton continued to paint until 1975, when she fell and broke her collarbone. Newton died at the age of 83 in Cowansville, Quebec in 1980.
