= Anne Savage (artist) =

Canadian painter and art teacher (1896–1971)

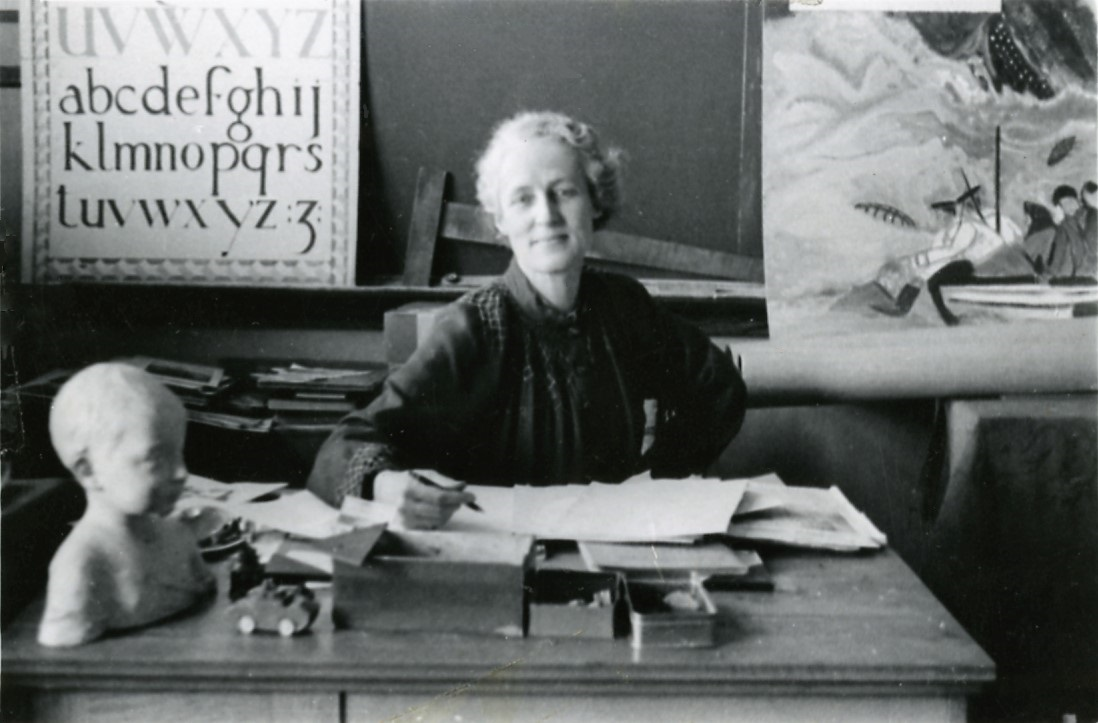
- Anne Savage sitting at her desk, 1940
- Born: Annie Douglas Savage; July 27, 1896; Montreal, Quebec, Canada
- Died: March 25, 1971 (aged 74); Montreal, Quebec, Canada
- Known for: painter and art teacher

Anne (Annie) Douglas Savage (July 27, 1896 – March 25, 1971) was a Canadian painter and art teacher known for her lyrical, rhythmic landscapes. She was a founding member of the Canadian Group of Painters.

== Early life ==
Savage was born in Montreal, Quebec, Canada, the daughter of John Savage, a wealthy industrialist. She grew up in what was then the rural area of Dorval, Quebec, and spent her summers at the family cottage in the Laurentian Mountains, where she developed a love of her surroundings that became a source of inspiration for her art. She studied at the High School of Montreal.

== Artistic career ==
Between 1914 and 1918, Savage studied art at the Art Association of Montreal under several instructors including William Brymner (1855–1925) and Maurice Cullen. Her private world was permanently changed when her beloved twin brother was killed in action in France during World War I. After the end of the war, Savage went to Minneapolis, Minnesota where she studied design at the Minneapolis School of Art. On her return to Montreal, she took a job as an art teacher at Baron Byng High School where she would remain for 26 years (1922–1947). In addition, she taught art courses to children, promoting their early exposure to the field and years later was able to see the formation of the Child Art Council in Quebec, later known as the Quebec Society for Education through Art.

In 1921, Savage joined the Beaver Hall Hill Group whose painters were closely allied to the Group of Seven. A. Y. Jackson, a member of the Group of Seven would become Savage's lifelong close friend. After spending some time at the Ontario College of Art in Toronto with the painter Arthur Lismer, another member of the Group of Seven, Savage traveled to Europe where some of her works were exhibited. Savage also spent time in British Columbia and did sketches of native villages on the northwest coast; this work was displayed in 1927 at the National Gallery in the exhibition "Canadian West Coast Art, Native and Modern". In 1933, she was one of the founding members of the Canadian Group of Painters and in 1949 and 1960 would serve as its president. She was appointed supervisor of art for the Protestant School Board of Montreal in 1948. She was instrumental in the founding of the High School Art Teaching Association and in 1955 inspired the formation of the Child Art Council which became the Quebec Society for Education through Art.

Savage retired from full-time teaching in 1953 and was named the Supervisor of Art for the Protestant School Board of Greater Montreal. She was then invited by McGill University to teach, where she ended up teaching between 1954 and 1959.

Throughout her life, Savage was involved with women's rights and gender inequity. Among the groups she joined was the League for Women's Rights, Montreal's suffrage organization. Curiously, in a speech in 1942, she said that she felt that women artists no longer faced gender inequality. They were equal to men except for housekeeping. Yet, as Kristina Huneault, the author of this article, points out, housekeeping is no minor matter because it takes time and energy away from art-making and reinforces the perception that women's place was in the home.

== Death ==
Savage died in Montreal in 1971 and was interred there in the Mount Royal Cemetery.

The Anne Savage Archives can be found at Montreal's Concordia University.

== Works ==
- Early Settlers, c.1930
- The Wood, 1938
- Le lac le soir, Wonish, c. 1950s
- The Little Pine - Lake Wonish, n.d.

== Record sale prices ==
At Cowley Abbott Spring Auction of Select Masterworks of Canadian and International Art, May 27, 2026, lot 42, Savage's Concarneau, 1924, 8.75 × 12.5 in., estimated at CA$15,000 - CA$20,000, sold for$181,250 (including Buyer's Premium).
