= Maurice Cullen (artist) =

Canadian artist (1866–1934)

Maurice Galbraith Cullen
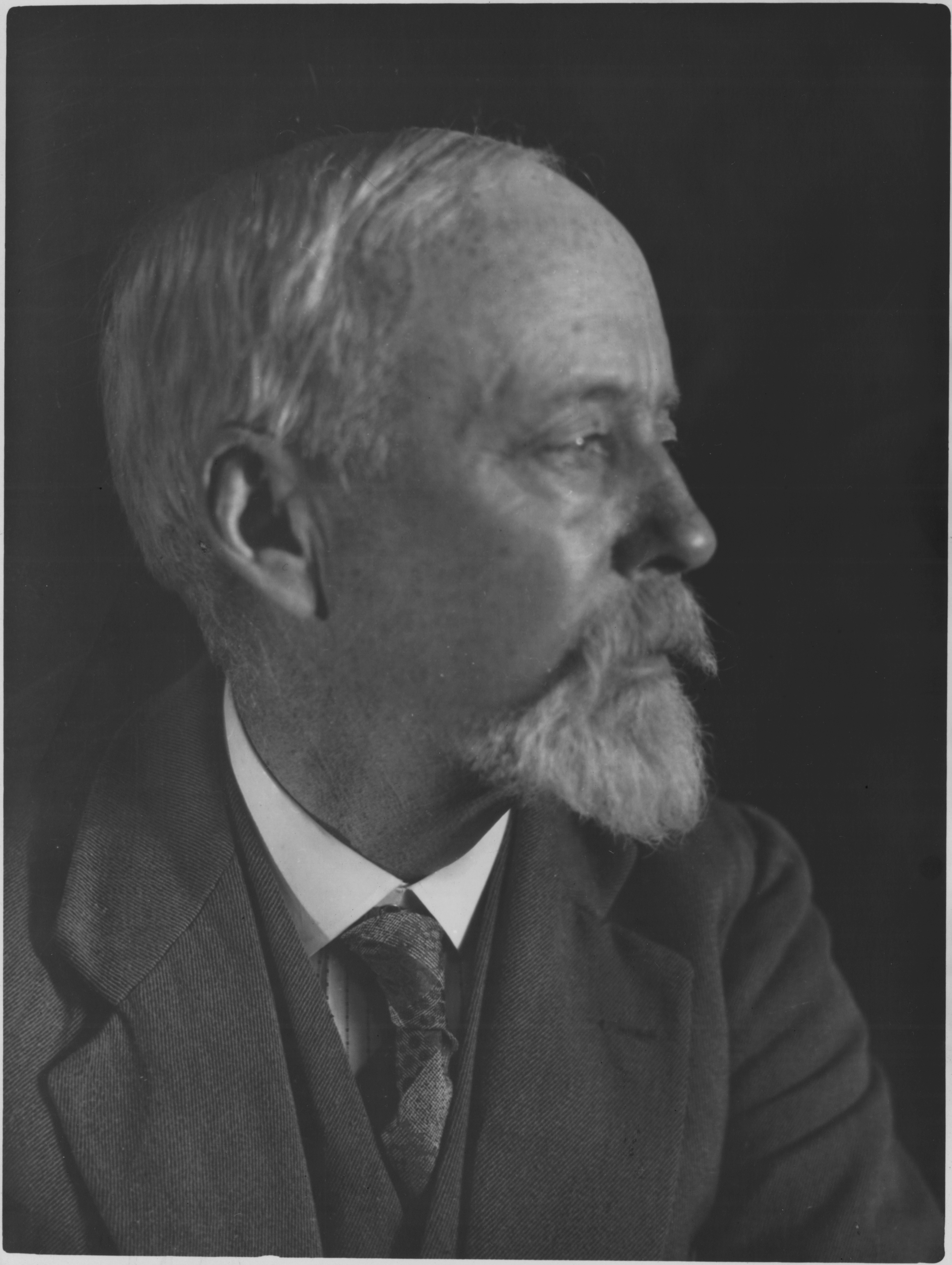
- Born: Maurice Galbraith Cullen; 6 June 1866; St. John's, Newfoundland Colony
- Died: 28 March 1934 (aged 67); Chambly, Quebec, Canada
- Education: Montreal, Conseil des Arts et Manufactures (sculpture); Montreal, with sculptor Louis-Philippe Hébert, 1880s; Paris, École des Beaux Arts, with Élie Delaunay, 1889–1892, turned from sculpture to painting; Paris, with Alfred Philippe Roll
- Known for: Painter, teacher at Art Association of Montreal (1911)
- Movement: Impressionism
- Spouse: Barbara Merchant Pilot (married 1910)
- Awards: Associate, Société Nationale des Beaux-Arts, Paris, 1895; Associate, Royal Canadian Academy of Arts, 1899; member, R.C.A., 1907

Maurice Cullen RCA (June 6, 1866 – March 28, 1934) is considered to be the father of Canadian Impressionism because he was the first artist to skillfully adapt French Impressionism to Canadian conditions. He is best known for his paintings of snow and his depictions of ice harvest scenes, featuring horse-drawn sleighs traveling across the frozen waters of Quebec during winter. The Laurentians were his greatest love and he painted there often. He excelled in painting crisp northern light.

== Life and work ==
Cullen was born in St. John's, Newfoundland Colony. His parents were James Cullen of St. John’s and Sarah Galbraith Ward of Montreal. In 1870 his family moved to Montreal, Quebec where he began his art training studying sculpture at the Conseil des Arts et Manufactures and with the sculptor Louis-Philippe Hébert at the Monument National.

Maurice Cullen went to Paris in 1889 to study sculpture on the advice of Hébert. He entered the École des Beaux-Arts and had not been there long when, according to Montreal art dealer William R. Watson, he realized his vocation was painting and he "exchanged his chisel for a brush." Besides the Quebec landscape, with Jean-Léon Gérôme and at the Académie Colarossi with Gustave Courtois and L.A. Rixens. He later studied at the Académie Julian and was admitted to the École des Beaux-Arts in 1890 and studied with Élie Delaunay and Alfred Philippe Roll.

Although he received academic training, he was influenced in his painting by the Impressionists, especially Claude Monet and, as early as 1891, critics gave positive reviews to his Impressionist-influenced work. In 1895, the French Government purchased a painting entitled Été from the Société's annual salon (now at the Musée de Pithiviers) and he was elected an associate of the Société Nationale des Beaux-Arts – the first Canadian to be so honoured.

However, in 1895, he returned to Montreal and made it his home, turning from French subjects to Canadian ones, with an emphasis on snowscapes and using a modified Impressionist technique. Besides the Quebec landscape, he became the chronicler of the city, darkening his palette. In 1899, he was elected an associate member of the Royal Canadian Academy of Arts (he was elected a full member in 1907). After about 1900 he achieved commercial and critical success. He won a bronze medal in 1901 at the Pan-American Exhibition in Buffalo and in 1904, another at the Canadian exhibition at the Louisiana Purchase Exposition, (the St. Louis World's Fair).

In 1910, he married Barbara Merchant Pilot, a widow whose son, his stepson, grew up to be the artist Robert Wakeham Pilot. In the same year, he was invited to be a member of the progressive Canadian Art Club (1910). In 1911, he won the Jessie Dow Prize at the Art Association of Montreal. Cullen set an example for Canadian painters and progressive artists abroad. A. Y. Jackson said of him,

"To us, he was a hero."

Beginning in January 1918, Cullen served with Canadian forces with the rank of Captain in the First World War. He came to the attention of Lord Beaverbrook, who arranged for him to be commissioned as one of the Canadian official war artists along with Frederick Varley, J.W. Beatty and C. W. Simpson.

He was recognized by two retrospectives of his work in his lifetime: one organized by the Quebec government in 1930, one by the Watson Art Galleries in 1934. Cullen died March 28, 1934, at Chambly, Québec.

== Exhibitions ==
William Robinson Watson (1887–1973) in Montreal, of Watson Art Gallery, represented Cullen and published a book on him in 1931. In 2000, his retrospective was held in Montreal by Alan Klinkhoff Gallery with a catalogue essay by Conrad Graham. An exhibition, Legacies of Impressionism in Canada: Three Exhibitions, was held from January 31 to April 19, 2009 at the Vancouver Art Gallery. In 2019, the National Gallery of Canada travelling show, Canada and Impressionism: New Horizons, 1880-1930, opened in Munich. It came to the National Gallery of Canada in 2022.

== Selected works ==
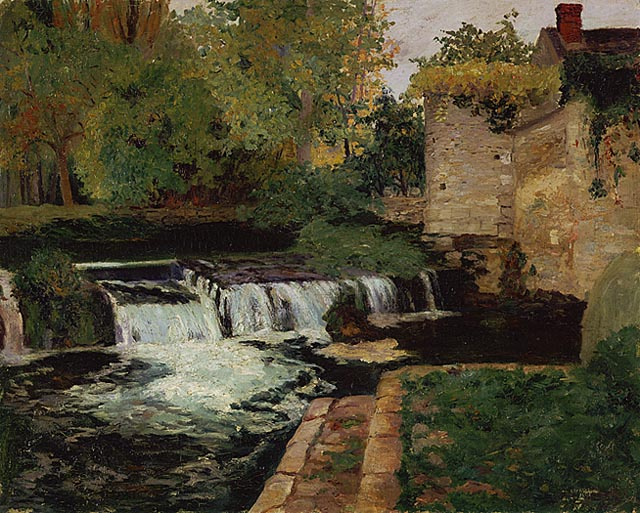
The Mill Stream (ca 1905), National Gallery of Canada.

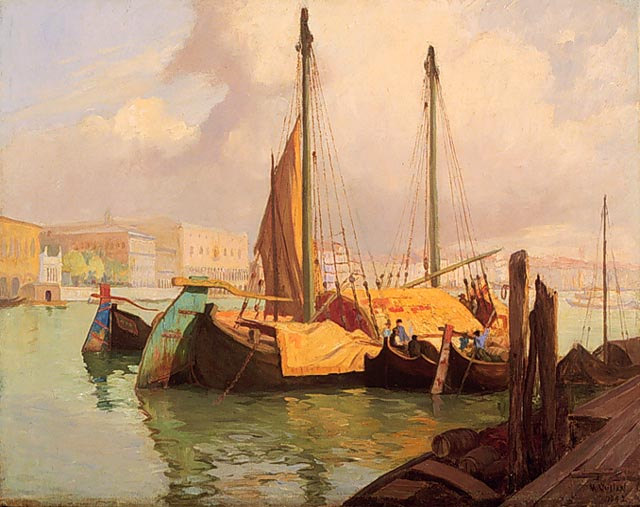
Customs Port, Venice (1897), National Gallery of Canada

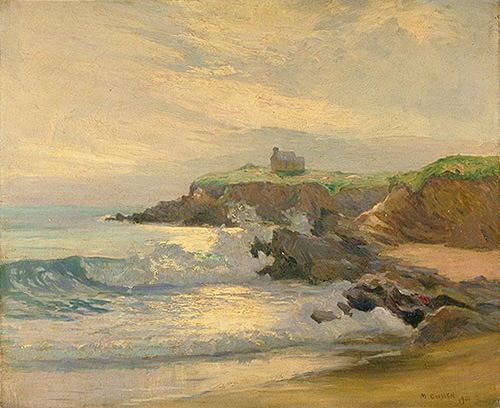
Rising Tide, Le Pouldu, Bretagne (1901), Musée des beaux-arts du Québec

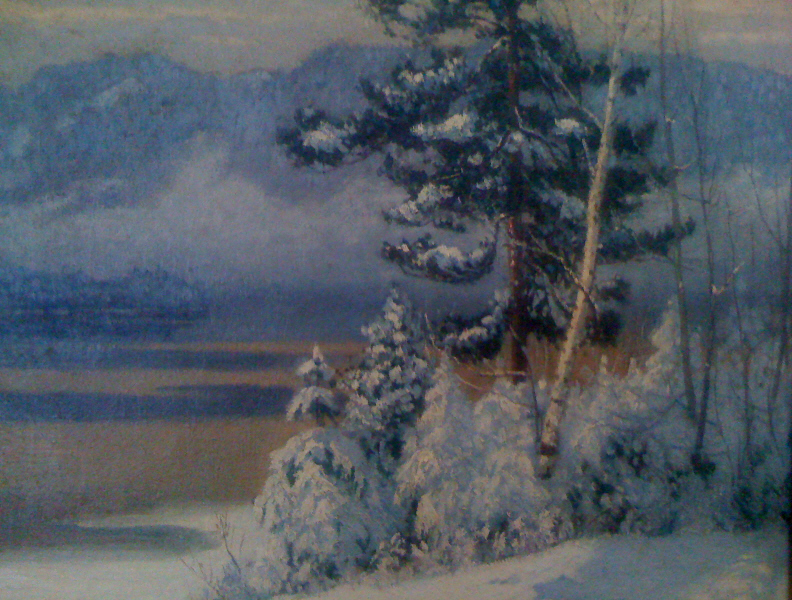
Snowfall, Lac Tremblant (1922) Private Collection

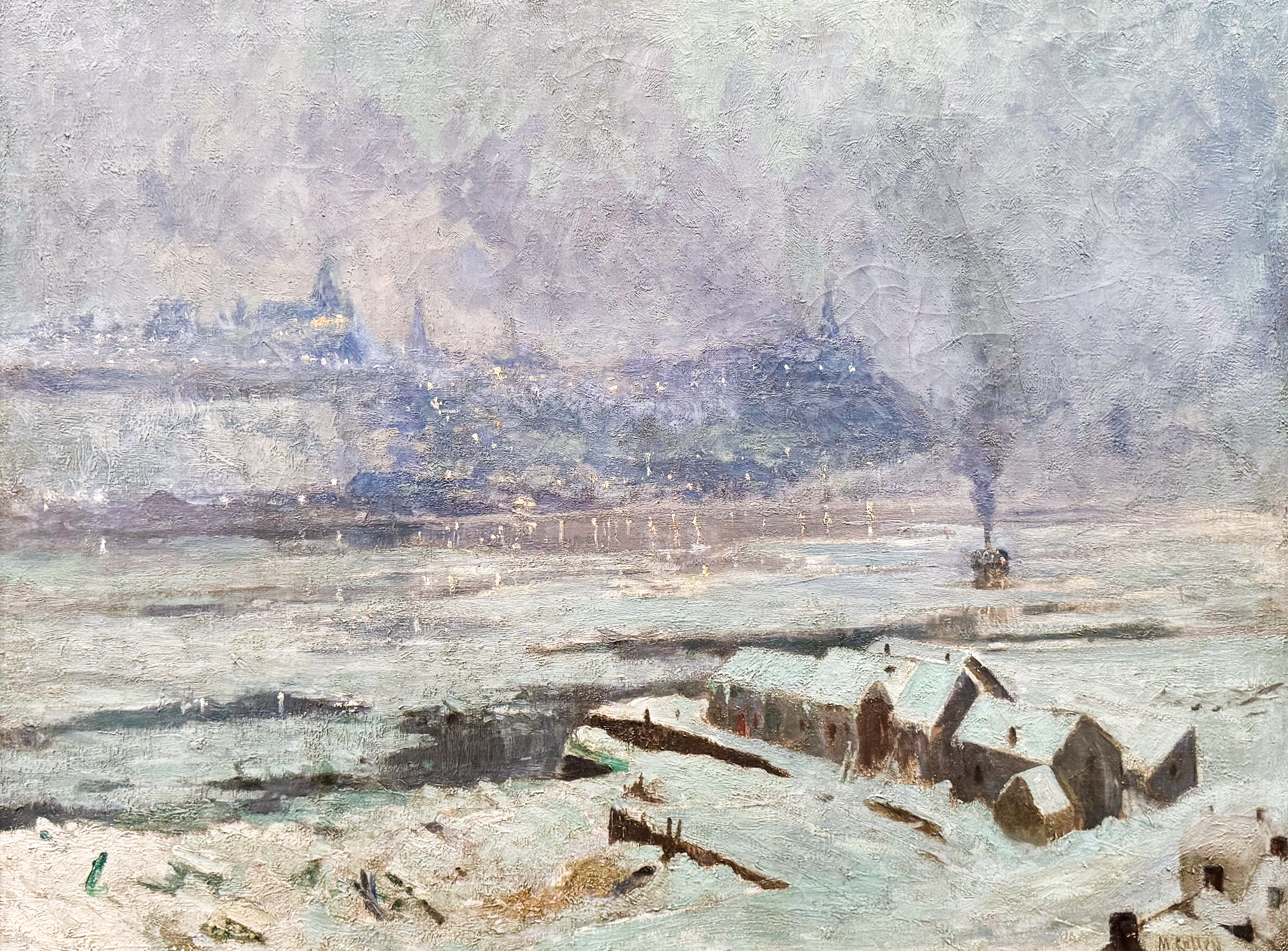
Winter Evening, Quebec (ca 1905), National Gallery of Canada

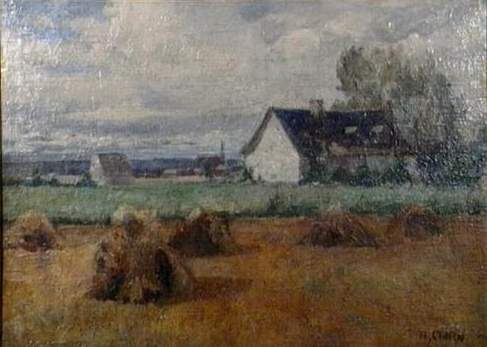
Ile d'Orleans landscape, Musée de la civilisation, Quebec

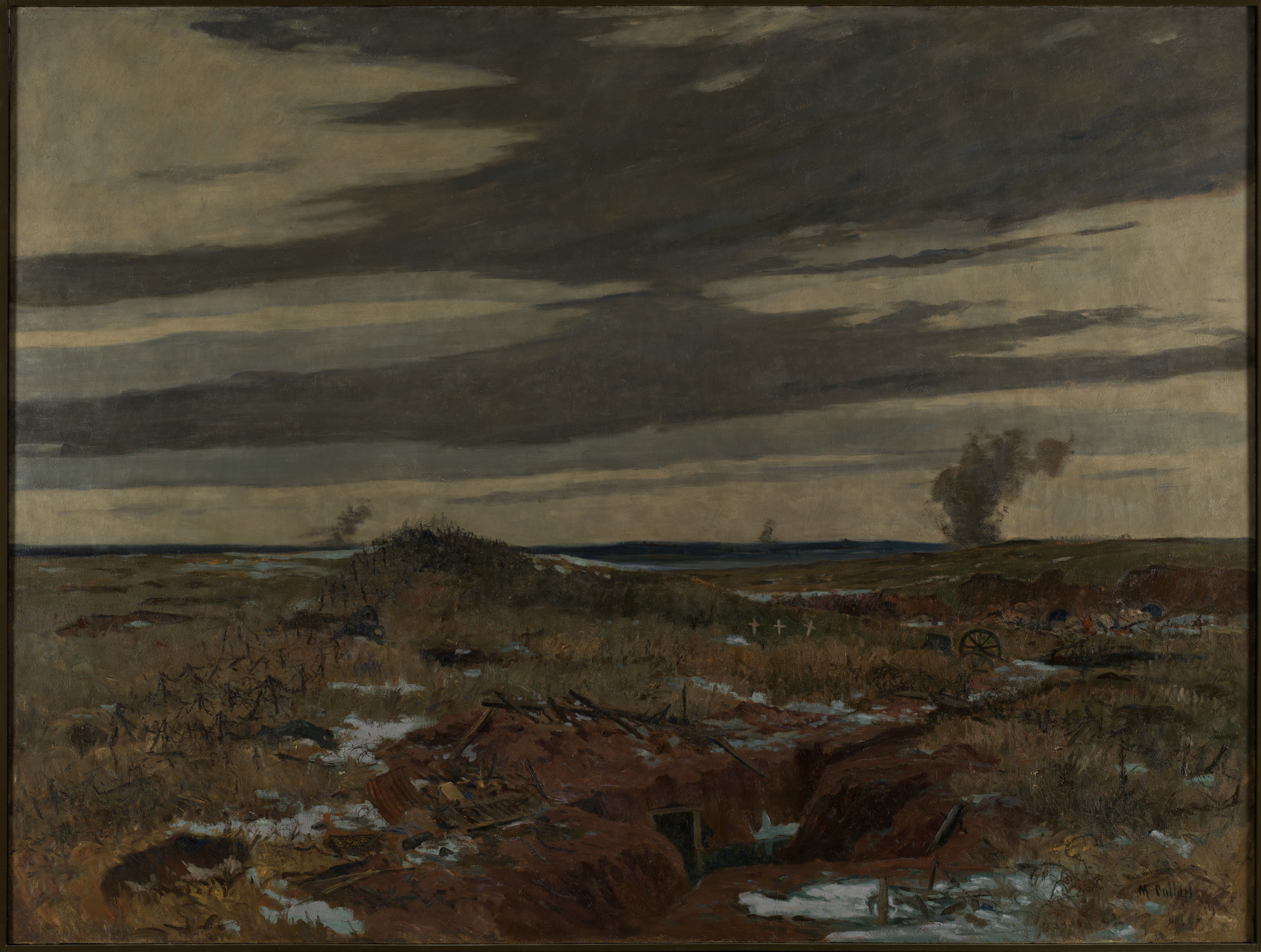
No Man's Land (Douai plain, France) (1920), Canadian War Museum

== Honours ==
- First Canadian to be elected associate member of Société nationale des Beaux-Arts, Paris, 1895;
- Royal Canadian Academy of Arts, elected full member 1907;
- Bronze medal, Canadian exhibition at the Louisiana Purchase Exposition, St. Louis, Missouri, 1904;
- Awarded Jessie Dow Prize, Art Association of Montreal, 1911, 1913;
- Elected first vice-president of Arts Club, Montreal (founded at his studio), 1912;
- He was declared a Canadian Person of National Historic Significance in 1944;

== See also ==
- Canadian official war artists

== Notes ==
=== Further reading ===
- Antoniou, Sylvia (1982). Maurice Cullen: 1866-1934. Kingston: Agnes Etherington Art Centre. ISBN 0889113696.
- Bruce, Tobi; Cable, Patrick Shaw (2011). The French Connection: Canadian Painters at the Paris Salons 1880-1900. Hamilton, Ontario: Art Gallery of Hamilton.
- Davis, Ann (1992). The Logic of Ecstasy: Canadian Mystical Painting, 1920–1940. Toronto: University of Toronto Press. ISBN 9780802059161; ISBN 9780802068613; OCLC 26256269
- Lowrey, Carol, Visions of Light and Air: Canadian Impressionism, 1885–1920, Americas Society, 1996.
- Prakash, A.K. (2015). Impressionism in Canada: A Journey of Rediscovery. Stuttgart: Arnoldsche Art Publishers. pp. 266–295. ISBN 978-3-89790-427-9.
