= Group of Seven (artists) =

Group of Canadian landscape painters (1920–1933)

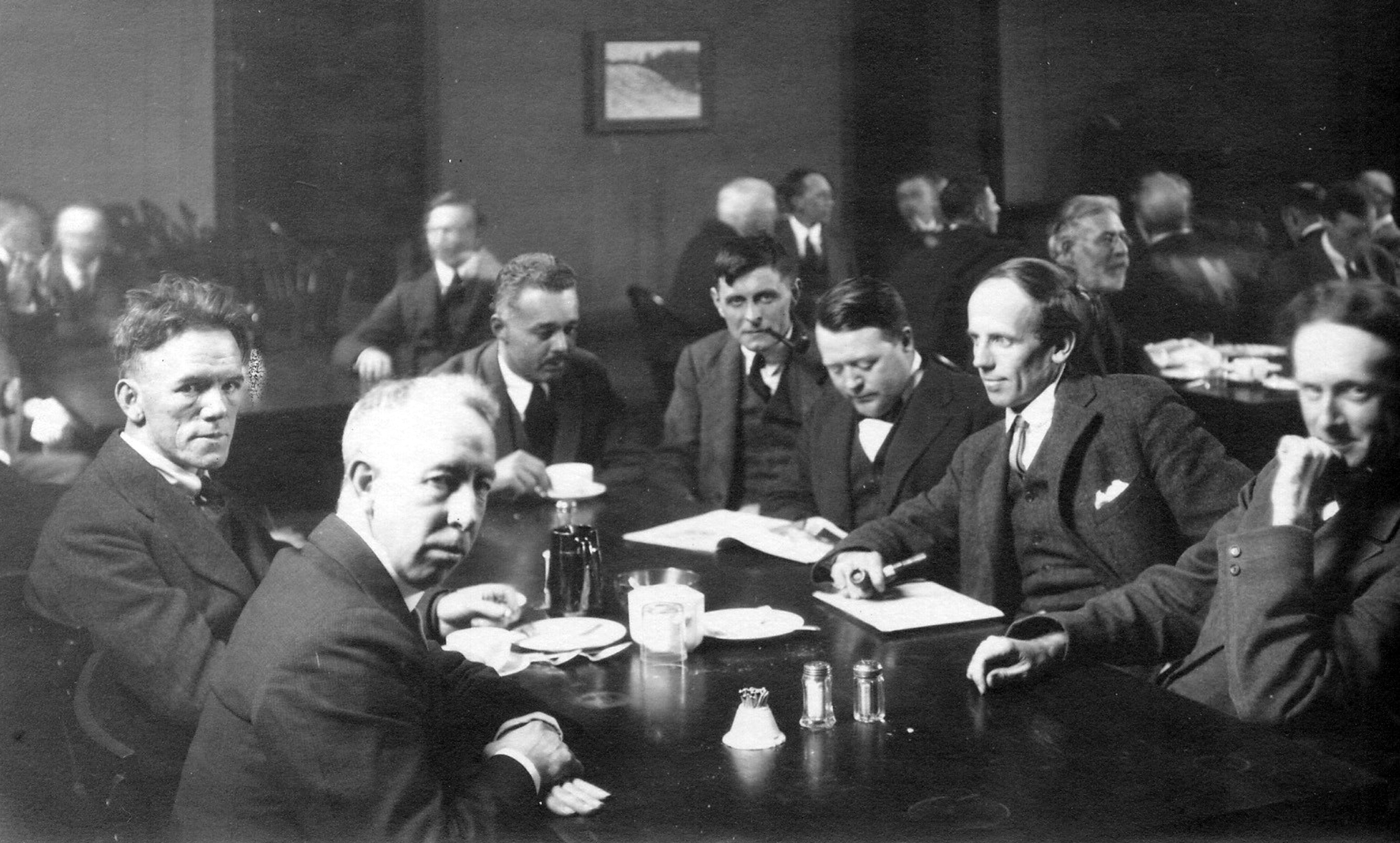
(l-r) Frederick Varley, A. Y. Jackson, Lawren Harris, Barker Fairley (not a member), Frank Johnston, Arthur Lismer, and J. E. H. MacDonald. Image ca. 1920, F 1066, Archives of Ontario, I0010313

The Group of Seven, once known as the Algonquin School, was a group of Canadian landscape painters from 1920 to 1933, with "a like vision". It originally consisted of Franklin Carmichael (1890–1945), Lawren Harris (1885–1970), A. Y. Jackson (1882–1974), Frank Johnston (1888–1949), Arthur Lismer (1885–1969), J. E. H. MacDonald (1873–1932), and Frederick Varley (1881–1969). A. J. Casson (1898–1992) was invited to join in 1926, Edwin Holgate (1892–1977) became a member in 1930, and Lionel LeMoine FitzGerald (1890–1956) joined in 1932.

Two artists associated with the group are Tom Thomson (1877–1917) and Emily Carr (1871–1945). Although he died before its official formation, Thomson had a significant influence on the group. In his essay "The Story of the Group of Seven", Harris wrote that Thomson was "a part of the movement before we pinned a label on it"; Thomson's paintings The West Wind and The Jack Pine are two of the group's most iconic pieces.

Believing that a distinct Canadian art could be developed through direct contact with nature, the Group of Seven is best known for its paintings inspired by the Canadian landscape, and initiated the first major Canadian national art movement. The Group was succeeded by the Canadian Group of Painters in 1933, which included members from the Beaver Hall Group who had a history of showing with the Group of Seven both nationally and internationally.

Contemporarily, the Group of Seven has received criticism that many of their works show the Canadian wilderness without Indigenous people residing there. Early reviews of their artwork described their style as rough, modern, or unusual, however with time the Group's style became appreciated and important to Canadian art and identity.

== Collections ==
Large collections of work of the Group of Seven are located at the Art Gallery of Ontario in Toronto, the National Gallery of Canada in Ottawa as well as the Ottawa Art Gallery (home to The Firestone Collection of Canadian Art) and the McMichael Canadian Art Collection in Kleinburg, Ontario. The National Gallery, under the directorship of Eric Brown, was an early institutional supporter of artists associated with the Group, purchasing art from some of their early exhibitions before they had identified themselves officially as the Group of Seven and afterwards. The Art Gallery of Ontario, in its earlier incarnation as the Art Gallery of Toronto, was the site of their first exhibition as the Group of Seven in 1920. Their work and that of their contemporaries was later included in the McMichael Canadian Art Collection.

== History ==
Red Maple, 1914, by A. Y. Jackson, National Gallery of Canada, Ottawa

Tom Thomson, J. E. H. MacDonald, Arthur Lismer, Frederick Varley, Frank Johnston and Franklin Carmichael met as employees of the design firm Grip Ltd. in Toronto. In 1913, they were joined by A. Y. (Alexander Young) Jackson and Lawren Harris. They often met at the Arts and Letters Club of Toronto to share their opinions about art.

This group received monetary support from Harris (heir to the Massey-Harris farm machinery fortune) and Dr. James MacCallum. Harris and MacCallum jointly built the Studio Building in 1914 in the Rosedale ravine to serve as a meeting and working place for the new Canadian art movement. MacCallum owned an island on Georgian Bay and Thomson worked as a guide in nearby Algonquin Park, both places where he and the other artists often travelled for inspiration.

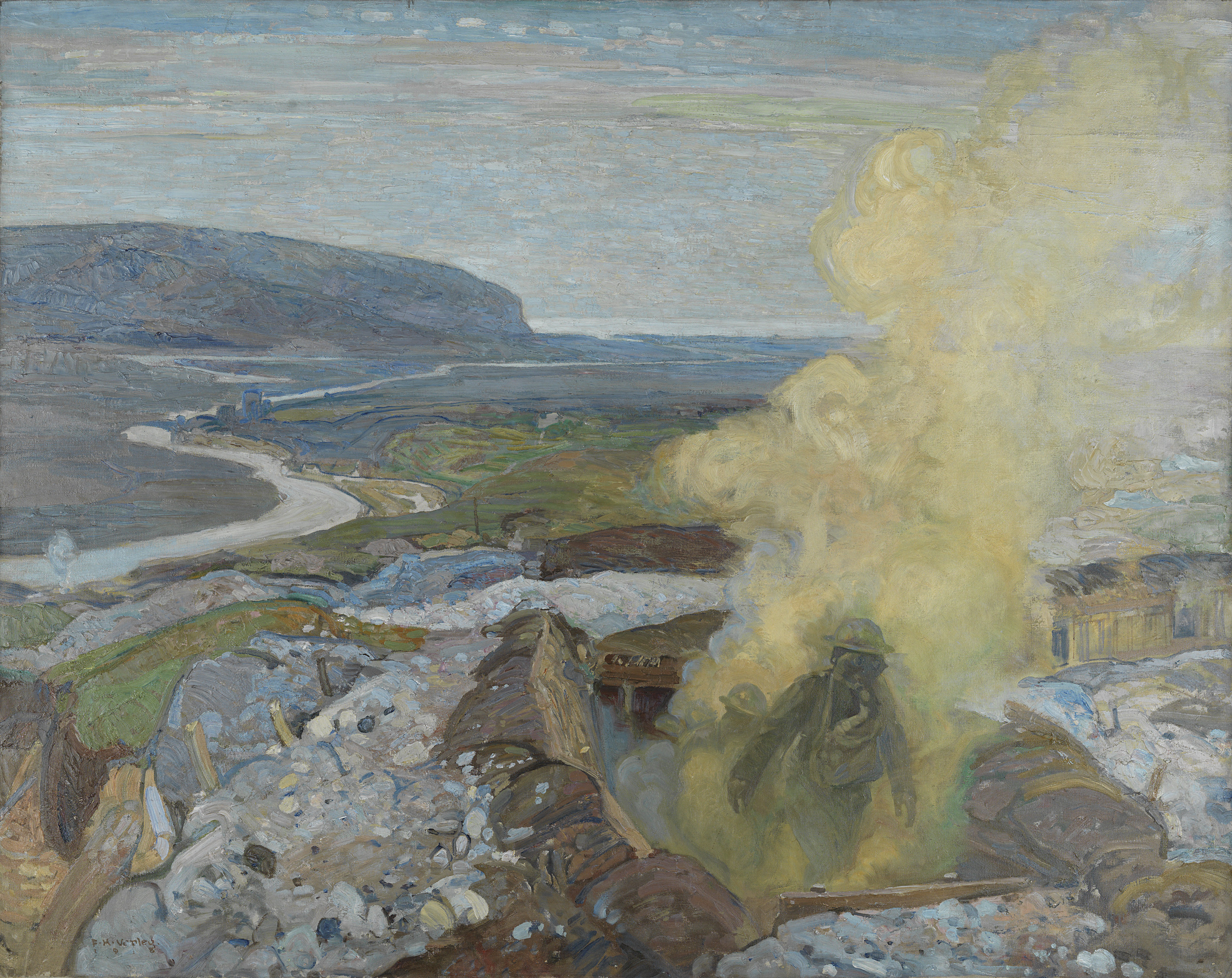
Gas Chamber at Seaford, 1918, by Frederick Varley, Canadian War Museum, Ottawa

The informal group was temporarily split up during World War I, during which Jackson and Varley became official war artists. Jackson enlisted in June 1915 and served in France from November 1915 to 1917, at which point he was seriously injured. Harris enlisted in 1916 and taught musketry at Camp Borden. He was discharged in May 1918 after suffering a nervous breakdown. Carmichael, MacDonald, Thomson, Varley and Johnston remained in Toronto and struggled in the depressed wartime economy. (Note: For a thorough discussion of the activity of the group during the war, refer to Mellen 1970, 70; Larisey 1993, 34-36; Reid 1971, 109-120) A further blow to the group came in 1917 when Thomson died mysteriously while canoeing in Algonquin Park. The circumstances of his death remain unclear.

The seven who formed the original group reunited after the war. They continued to travel throughout Ontario, especially the Muskoka and Algoma regions, sketching the landscape and developing techniques to represent it in art. In 1919, they decided to make themselves into a group devoted to a distinct Canadian form of art which did not exist yet, and began to call themselves the Group of Seven. It is unknown who specifically chose these seven men, but it is believed to have been Harris or Harris in combination with MacDonald. By 1920, they were ready for their first exhibition thanks to the constant support and encouragement of Eric Brown, the director of the National Gallery at that time. Reviews for the 1920 exhibition were mixed, but as the decade progressed the Group came to be recognized as pioneers of a new, Canadian, school of art.

After Frank Johnston moved to Winnipeg in the fall of 1921, Percy James Robinson is claimed to have been invited to fill the open spot. Robinson participated in the group's 3rd exhibition at the Art Gallery of Ontario. In 1926, A. J. Casson was invited to join. Franklin Carmichael had taken a liking to him and had encouraged Casson to sketch and paint for many years.

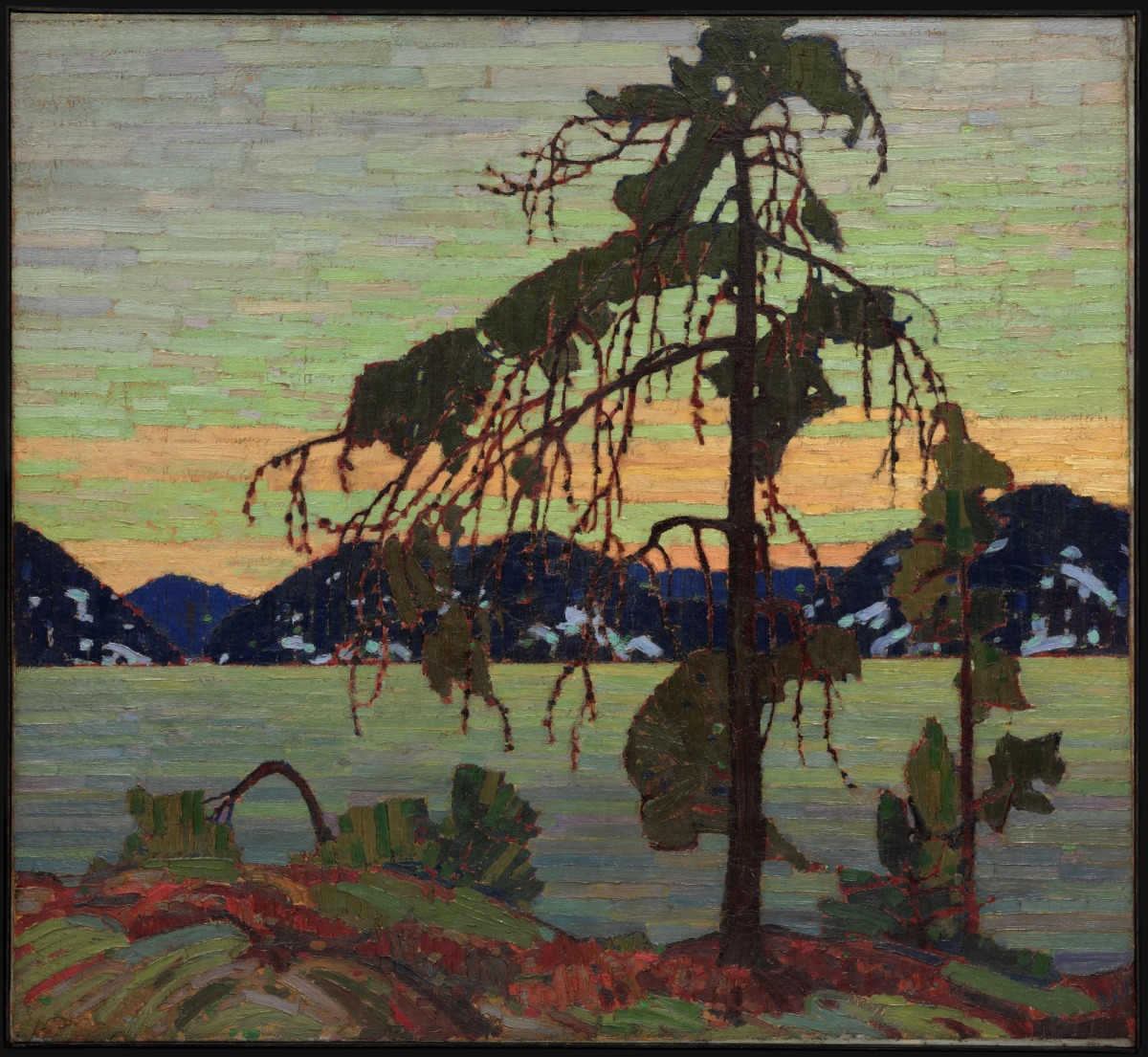
The Jack Pine, 1916–17, by Tom Thomson, National Gallery of Canada, Ottawa

The Group's champions during its early years included Barker Fairley, a co-founder of Canadian Forum magazine, and the warden of Hart House at the University of Toronto, J. Burgon Bickersteth.

The members of the Group began to travel elsewhere in Canada for inspiration, including British Columbia, Quebec, Nova Scotia, and the Arctic. After Samuel Gurney Cresswell and other painters on Royal Navy expeditions, these were the first artists of European descent who depicted the Arctic. Soon, the Group made the decision that to be called a "national school of painters" there should be members from outside Toronto. As a result, in 1930 Edwin Holgate from Montreal, Quebec became a member, followed by Lionel LeMoine FitzGerald from Winnipeg, Manitoba in 1932.

The Group's influence was so widespread by the end of 1931, and after J. E. H. MacDonald's death in 1932, they no longer found it necessary to continue as a group of painters. They announced that the Group had been disbanded and that a new association of painters would be formed, known as the Canadian Group of Painters. The Canadian Group — which eventually consisted of the majority of Canada's leading artists — held its first exhibition in 1933, and continued to hold exhibitions almost every year as a successful society until 1967.

== Recognition ==
On September 18, 1970, Canada Post issued 'The Group of Seven', designed by Allan Robb Fleming and based on a painting, Isles of Spruce (1922), by Arthur Lismer and held in the Hart House Permanent Collection, University of Toronto. The 6¢ stamps are perforated 11, and were printed by Ashton-Potter Limited.

On June 29, 1995, Canada Post issued 10 stamps, each based on a painting of a member of the group (7 original members and 3 additional members):

- Francis Hans Johnston, Serenity, Lake of the Woods
- Arthur Lismer, A September Gale, Georgian Bay
- James Edward Hervey MacDonald, Falls, Montreal River
- Frederick Horsman Varley, Open Window
- Franklin Carmichael, October Gold
- Lawren Stewart Harris, North of Lake Superior
- Alexander Young Jackson, Evening, Les Éboulements
- Alfred Joseph Casson, Mill Houses
- Lionel LeMoine FitzGerald, Pembina Valley
- Edwin Headley Holgate, The Lumberjack

On May 7, 2020, Canada Post honoured the centennial of the Group's first exhibition, at the Art Gallery of Toronto (May 7, 1920), by issuing seven stamps, featuring paintings by each of the original members. The stamps were produced in a booklet of seven self-adhesives, and on a souvenir sheet of seven gummed stamps. First day ceremonies were cancelled, due to the Covid-19 pandemic, so designs were unveiled online on May 6, via the social media accounts of the postal service and several galleries across the country which own the works featured on the stamps:

- In the Nickel Belt (1928), by Franklin Carmichael
- Miners’ Houses, Glace Bay (circa 1925), by Lawren S. Harris
- Labrador Coast (1930), by A.Y. Jackson
- Fire-swept, Algoma (1920), by Frank H. Johnston
- Quebec Village (1926), by Arthur Lismer
- Church by the Sea (1924), by J.E.H. MacDonald
- Stormy Weather, Georgian Bay (1921), by F.H. Varley

In 2012–2013, the Royal Canadian Mint issued seven pure silver one-ounce coins, collectively reproducing one painting by each original member:

- F.H. Varley Stormy Weather, Georgian Bay (April 2012)
- Arthur Lismer Nova Scotia Fishing Village (July 2012)
- Franklin Carmichael Houses, Cobalt (October 2012)
- Lawren S. Harris Toronto Street, Winter Morning (January 2013)
- Franz Johnston The Guardian of the Gorge (March 2013)
- J.E.H. MacDonald Sumacs (June 2013)
- A.Y. Jackson Saint-Tite-des-Caps (September 2013)

== Legacy ==
In 1966, the Legislative Assembly of Ontario incorporated the McMichael Canadian Art Collection, an art gallery with an institutional focus on the Group of Seven, along with "their contemporaries and on the aboriginal peoples of Canada". In addition to housing a collection of works by the Group of Seven, the museum property also contains the burial ground for six members of the group, including A.Y. Jackson, Arthur Lismer, Frederick Varley, Lawren Harris, Frank Johnston, and A.J. Casson; along with four of the artists' wives. The McMichael cemetery is situated in a small patch of consecrated land bordered by trees, with graves marked by large chunks of the Canadian Shield. The idea to use the property as a burial ground for the group was first proposed to the institution by Jackson in 1968.

In 1995, the National Gallery of Canada compiled a Group of Seven retrospective show, for which they commissioned the Canadian rock band Rheostatics to write a musical score. That score was released on album as Music Inspired by the Group of Seven.

Shows of Group of Seven members or single paintings in some combination are a perennial favorite of the Canadian exhibition world, particularly of the National Gallery of Canada. Usually the Group is simply regarded as part of Canadian art history and explored in depth, as, for instance, for the centenary, the Kelowna Art Gallery in 2020 organized Northern Pine: Watercolours and Drawings by the Group of Seven from the McMichael Canadian Art Collection curated by Ian M. Thom. For the centenary as well, the National Gallery of Canada's Philip Dombowsky of the Library and Archives at the Gallery organized a show titled Group of Seven: Graphic Design.

The Group of Seven has received criticism for reinforcing the concept of terra nullius by presenting the Canadian wilderness as pristine and untouched by humans, despite the fact that these areas had been lived in for centuries. Their status as contributors to modernism "rests ultimately on their best paintings".

== See also ==
- Beaver Hall Group
- Canadian Group of Painters
- Eastern Group of Painters
- Indian Group of Seven (group of Canadian First Nations Artists)
- Jewish Painters of Montreal
- Painters Eleven
- Regina Five
