= Valentin Gallery =

Art gallery in Canada

- Former name: L'Art français
- Established: 1934
- Location: Montreal, Quebec, Canada
- Coordinates: 45.4972°N 73.5808°W
- Type: Art Gallery
- Collections: Canadian, French and Quebecois artists
- Founders: Lucienne & Louis Lange
- Curator: Jean-Pierre Valentin

Valentin Gallery is an art gallery in Quebec. Created in 1934, it was first called "L'Art français" and had its start on Laurier Street in Montreal. Owners Lucienne (1900-1992) and Louis (1890-1956) Lange initially showed works by French artists. By the 1940s they were offering art by Marc-Aurèle Fortin and Philip Surrey. In 1975, Jean-Pierre Valentin purchased the gallery. The gallery moved to its present Sherbrooke Street location later and changed the name to Valentin Gallery.

== Galerie L'Art français ==
In the beginning, L'Art français was a shop selling frames and reproductions of French paintings. The owners were Louis and Lucienne Lange, who came to Canada in 1930. Louis was from Belgium and Lucienne from France. They were ready to go back to Europe when they decided to open the framing gallery on Laurier Avenue, incorporating print sales for better access to the public. Through the framing activity, they started meeting artists who came there to have their paintings framed. In 1936, the first show by Quebec artist Fleurimont Constantineau was the starting point in a non-stop series of exhibitions. Mr. Lange then decided to travel to Europe, especially to France and Belgium, in order to buy paintings. The gallery also exhibited young Canadian painters. While it opened with a stock entirely from France, World War II interrupted importations so it went Canadian. In 1943 and 1944 two solo exhibitions of Henri Masson and the first solo of René Richard were held. Sculptures by Jordi Bonet were also exhibited. In the 1950s, painters such as John Little were regularly exhibited. Canadian painters were now the main feature of exhibitions at L'Art français. The Lange also sold the paintings of painters such as Adrien Hébert, Suzor-Côté, Alfred Laliberté, Clarence Gagnon, Horatio Walker, Cornelius Krieghoff, Coburn, Lyman, Jackson, and also abstract surrealist works by Riopelle, Pellan, Borduas, and Jean Dallaire. In 1956, Mr. Lange died and his wife decided to carry on. She exhibited Miyuki Tanobe. During these years, Stanley Cosgrove, Ozias Leduc, Paul Soulikias and Goodridge Roberts exhibited their works here. The gallery exhibited also Henri Masson, Berthe des Clayes, Edmund Alleyn, Ghitta Caiserman, P.V Beaulieu, Lismer, Borenstein, Pilot, Emily Carr, Brymner, Cullen, Franchère, Adrien Hébert, Massicotte, Plamondon, John Young Johnstone, Bourassa, Laliberté and Henri Julien.

== Valentin Gallery ==
Since the early 1970s, the gallery exhibits Miyuki Tanobe, young Canadian painters and more "classical" painters such as Marc-Aurèle Fortin. The Musée national des beaux-arts du Québec had access to the Fortin's research resources for an exhibition about the artist. The gallery also helps tracking down works in private collections for exhibitions in museums. Instead of focusing on French art, the gallery forged ahead by choosing to display Québécois and Canadian artists like Lemieux, Riopelle, Suzor-Coté. Retrospective exhibitions were held with artists such as Philip Surrey, Molinari, Dallaire, Borduas, Lyman. The gallery also exhibits young sculptors and painters such as Christian Deberdt, Geneviève Jost, Élène Gamache et Pearl Levy, Jeannette Perreault, Maja Vodanovic, Henry Wanton Jones, Stanislav Germanov, Thérèse Lacasse, Guylaine Beauchemin. At each anniversary the gallery presents a selection of Canada classics.

== Jean-Pierre Valentin ==
Born in France in 1949, he is a master in International Trade after studies in a Paris commerce school. He was a Paris-based art dealer who travelled the world selling works of art. In 1977, he occupied a position on the Board of Trustees of the Professional Art Dealers Association of Canada. In 1981, he became the youngest president and was re-elected in 1983. He has given conferences on how to build an art collection and on how to invest in art, on the importance of a good appraisal and on the works of Marc-Aurèle Fortin. He is working on a catalogue raisonné of this artist.
