= Alan Klinkhoff Gallery =

Coordinates: 45.4978°N 73.5803°W

- Industry: Canadian Art specialty services
- Founder: Alan Klinkhoff
- Headquarters: Montreal and Toronto, Canada
- Area served: worldwide
- Key people: Alan Klinkhoff; Jonanthan Klinkhoff
- Website: www.klinkhoff.ca

Alan Klinkhoff Gallery is a Canadian fine art corporation located in Montreal and Toronto. A member of the Art Dealers Association of Canada, the firm provides acquisition and evaluation services for collectors, as well as exhibitions and sales of Canadian art by such artists as Paul-Émile Borduas, Emily Carr, Marc-Aurèle Fortin, Lawren Harris, A.Y. Jackson, Jean Paul Lemieux, David Milne, Robert Pilot, and Marc-Aurèle Suzor-Côté. Alan Klinkhoff, a frequent commenter on Canadian art and art market, is quoted in the Montreal Gazette, The Globe and Mail, Toronto Star, Financial Post, The New York Times, and on CBC Television. The gallery, a successor to Galerie Walter Klinkhoff, is known for museum-quality, non-sale exhibitions of important Canadian painters.

== Alan Klinkhoff ==
The son of Montreal gallerists Walter and Gertrude Klinkhoff, Alan Klinkhoff (born 1953) was first introduced to the art world at age 12 when he delivered three paintings from A.Y. Jackson's Ottawa studio to Galerie Walter Klinkhoff (1949-2013). A dealer of the Group of Seven (1968), the gallery was known for "museum-quality exhibitions at which nothing was for sale". In 1970 Alan took his first purchasing trip overseas and in 1972 began to assist in the gallery during school holidays. In 1974 he studied art in Paris and, on his return to the gallery, co-founded with his brother Eric a fine-art evaluation, restoration and framing service, Services D'Art Klinkhoff (1975-1983). Alan also assisted with the gallery's retrospectives for Marc-Aurèle Suzor-Coté (1977), Paul-Émile Borduas (1986), and A.Y. Jackson (1990). The Klinkhoffs, known for their support of the Beaver Hall Group, also organized retrospective exhibitions for Prudence Heward (1980), Ethel Seath (1987), Mabel Lockerby (1989), Ann Savage (1992), and Lilias Torrence (1995) as well as a group show (1999). From 1988 to 1997 Alan Klinkhoff was contracted as an art evaluator for the federal Department of Justice. After the death of his father in 1997, Alan's sons Jonathan and Craig apprenticed with the gallery. In 2013, following Sotheby's departure from art auctions in Canada, Alan was interviewed on the Canadian art market in The Financial Post. After the dissolution of Galerie Walter Klinkhoff, Alan, together with his wife Helen and sons Jonathan and Craig, established the Alan Klinkhoff Gallery.

== Alan Klinkhoff Gallery ==
Alan Klinkhoff Gallery (Galerie Alan Klinkhoff) opened at 1448 Sherbrooke Street West on Gallery Row adjacent the Montreal Museum of Fine Arts (MMFA) in February 2014. In October the gallery participated in the Journal of Canadian Art History's colloquium: "Frame and Framing in Canada: Functions and History" organized by the MMFA. That year the Klinkhoffs also opened a Toronto office and gallery at 113 Yorkville Avenue, managed by son Jonathan. In 2015 Alan was interviewed on the authenticity of sketches attributed to J.E.H. MacDonald. In October, concurrent with the Beaver Hall Group's MMFA exhibition, the Montreal and Toronto galleries mounted The Beaver Hall Group & The Klinkhoff Family with memorabilia and anecdotes from previous group exhibitions. In 2016 both galleries also presented the exhibition René Richard: Tom Thomson of the North. In November Alan was interviewed on Canadian art sales when Lawren Harris' painting Mountain Forms, previously sold by Galerie Walter Klinkhoff, set auction records at $11.2 million. The gallery also held the estate sale of collector William I M. Turner Jr which included works by Albert Robinson, Franklin Carmichael, A. J. Casson, J.E.H. MacDonald, Goodridge Roberts, and F. H. Varley. In spring 2017, the Toronto gallery opened the Lawren Harris & Canadian Masters Sale with a lecture on Harris' work by Charles C. Hill, former curator of Canadian Art at the National Gallery of Canada. The sale of 14 of Harris' works included one painting for $9.5 million for a total over $30 million. At the time of the federal review of the Art Gallery of Nova Scotia's acquisition of 2,000 photographs by Annie Leibovitz, Alan Klinkhoff as a former "expert for the Canadian government" was quoted in the Toronto Star, as well as in The New York Times, and on CBC Television. In November 2017 the gallery held non-sale exhibitions in both Montreal and Toronto of John Little's paintings, the first that Little "consented to in nearly 40 years".

== Public Events and Exhibitions ==
The gallery encourages visits by "art students, teachers, collectors and a general public" through lecture series and open exhibitions. The Montreal gallery, managed by Alan Klinkhoff and son Craig, mounted the graduating class of Montreal's Lower Canada College Exhibition. The gallery also mounts popular, non-sale retrospective exhibitions open to the public. In 2016 the Montreal and Toronto galleries exhibition of art and hockey sticks Fine Art & Hockey: A Point of View attracted hockey stars Sidney Crosby and Brad Marchand.

== Honours and awards ==
- 2025 Recipient of the King Charles III Coronation Medal for the Promotion and Preservation of Canadian Art.
