= William R. Watson =

Canadian art dealer (1887–1973)

- Born: William Robinson Watson; 1887; Freshfield, England
- Died: March 6, 1973 (aged 86); Montreal, Canada

William Robinson Watson (1887 – March 6, 1973) was an English-born Canadian art dealer who, through his staunch friendships with artists and his energetic enthusiasm for their work, helped establish the market for Canadian art. By the second half of the 1920s, he was Montreal's leading art dealer.

== Life ==
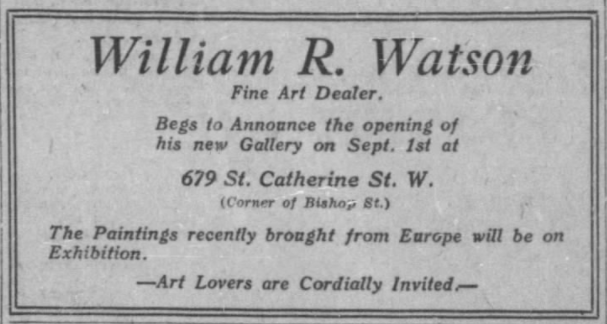
Advertisement in the Montreal Gazette, 1922

Watson was born in 1887 in Freshfield, England. He immigrated to Canada in 1905 and got his first job, with John Ogilvy, a former dry goods merchant who ran an art business as a hobby. He recalled later that they sold contemporary French, English, and Dutch paintings, sent from England by Harry Wallis, an art dealer in London. Watson believed that the art shop of John Ogilvy was the first gallery in Montreal devoted exclusively to art.

Watson, who advocated that Ogilvy take on works of Canadian art, was told that they were too noisy to mix with quiet Dutch pictures. However, when Watson's father, Robinson Watson (1851–1920), formerly a prosperous jute merchant in England, established an antique shop in Montreal, Watson discovered that his father's clients could be interested in buying works of art. Having acquired the business of Ogilvy when Ogilvy retired in 1908, he became an art dealer as well as an art critic for the newspapers, with a one-room gallery at the back of his father's store. There, Watson sold European and British art, some of it sent to him from the firm of Vicars Brothers of Bond Street, London, England, a firm to which he had been introduced by Ogilvy. Hazel Vicars was Watson's mentor in both art and life. Vicars had fundamental honesty, keen perception, and a positive attitude to life, qualities that Watson admired.

In 1921, after his father's death, when Watson's Antique Galleries closed, William Watson opened Watson Art Galleries, which sold art goods exclusively at 679 St. Catherine Street West (St. Catherine and Bishop). In 1932, he moved to 1434 Sherbrooke Street West, where he remained until he retired in 1958.

In Paris, Watson bought paintings by Maurice Utrillo among others and purchased many by Eugène Boudin from the firm of Durand-Ruel, which had been the artist's champion. In Canada, Watson was one of the first art dealers to carry and promote Canadian art, becoming friendly in the process with artists such as James Wilson Morrice, Maurice Cullen, Marc-Aurèle de Foy Suzor-Coté, Clarence Gagnon, and William Brymner. He helped these artists, even placing shows at galleries other than his own. In 1914, when he became President of the Montreal Arts Club, he organized one-person shows in the Club of Morrice and Jackson. Other Canadian artists such as Helen McNicoll, found their work praised in the newspaper review he wrote in the Montreal Gazette.

The first Canadian painting he sold, in 1906 when he was with Ogilvy, was by Frederick S. Coburn, and he maintained a friendship with Coburn and sold his work, as well as that of Albert H. Robinson, A. Y. Jackson, Emily Carr and Robert Pilot. His ledger books show that Watson was also interested in earlier Canadian art, such as the paintings of Cornelius Krieghoff and Otto Reinhold Jacobi. He also devoted a chapter to locating the work of Krieghoff in his book Retrospective: Recollections of a Montreal Art Dealer.

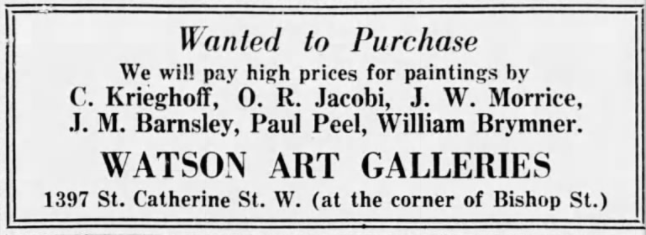
Advertisement in the Montreal Gazette, 1930

Among these artists, he had a special relationship with Cullen, whom he met around 1908 and whose work he began to sell that year and in the years that followed: he held thirteen one-person shows for Cullen from 1923 to 1935. These shows were well attended and a commercial success, which made an immense difference to Cullen. In 1926, Cullen had enough money to move from Montreal and buy a house at Chambly, where he settled with his family, all due to Watson.

In 1931, Watson published a book about Cullen, Maurice Cullen, R.C.A.: A Record of Struggle and Achievement. In 1934, he organized a retrospective of Cullen's work.

In 1925, after the death of Brymner, he organized a show of All the Remaining Paintings and Water Colors by Brymner, as well as giving a show to Alfred Laliberté. In 1926, he gave one-person exhibitions to Cullen's stepson, Robert Pilot, his first, as well as A. H. Robinson and Suzor-Coté. In the period from 1927 to 1929, he gave Suzor-Côté a major exhibition as well as giving three one-person shows to Pilot. In the 1930s, besides Cullen, he showed the work of Pilot in nine one-person shows as well as showing the work of Alex Colville and B.C. Binning.

When he closed the Watson Art Gallery in 1958 at seventy-one years of age, Jackson wrote a letter in which he acknowledged Watson's role, writing "You have known, and been a good friend to nearly all the artists, and must have happy memories of them."

== Personal life, death and legacy ==
Watson was married to Cécile Bérard. They had two daughters, Claire and Louise.

Watson died on March 6, 1973, at the age of 86. His memoir, Retrospective: Recollections of an Art Dealer, was written shortly before his death, edited by his daughters, and published posthumously by the University of Toronto Press in 1974. In the National Post, writer Arnold Edinborough described it as "a sunny account of a life lived in the midst of great paintings and among a host of artists who became friends."

Watson is credited for his role in encouraging the growth of Canada's art scene. His papers and ledger book are included in the Library and Archives of the National Gallery of Canada. Another William Robinson Watson fonds is held by Library and Archives Canada (MG30-D310, R2836-0-1-E).

In 1982, the prominent Canadian art dealer G. Blair Laing wrote in his "Memoirs of an Art Dealer2" that Watson deserves credit as one of Montreal's most reliable dealers, writing that

"When you see a Watson label on a picture he has previously sold, you can be absolutely sure it is a genuine work by the artist represented".
