= Galerie Walter Klinkhoff =

Galerie Walter Klinkhoff (1949 - 2013) was a Canadian art gallery in Montreal, Quebec, which specialized in the purchase and sale of Canadian Art from 1850 on.

Founded in 1949 by Walter and Gertrude Klinkhoff, the gallery dealt directly with some of the most important Canadian artists including A.Y. Jackson, Arthur Lismer, Edwin Holgate, Marc-Aurele Fortin, Prudence Heward and Kathleen Morris, to name a few.

At the time of Walter Klinkhoff's death in 1997, he was described as "a dealer who shaped Canadian art collections". The gallery continued under the direction of Gertrude Klinkhoff and sons Eric and Alan, and grandsons Jonathan and Craig. In December 2013 the firm was dissolved and successor galleries established as Galerie Eric Klinkhoff in Montreal and Alan Klinkhoff Gallery in Montreal and Toronto.

Galerie Walter Klinkhoff was a founding member of the Art Dealer's Association of Canada in 1966. Walter Klinkhoff was honoured posthumously with The Art Dealers Association of Canada's Lifetime Achievement Award in 2004.

Following the Randolph Hewton Retrospective (1962), the gallery became known for its annual view-only, "museum-quality exhibitions at which nothing was for sale".
