= Paul Soulikias =

Greek-Canadian painter (1926–2023)

- Πωλ Σουλικιάς
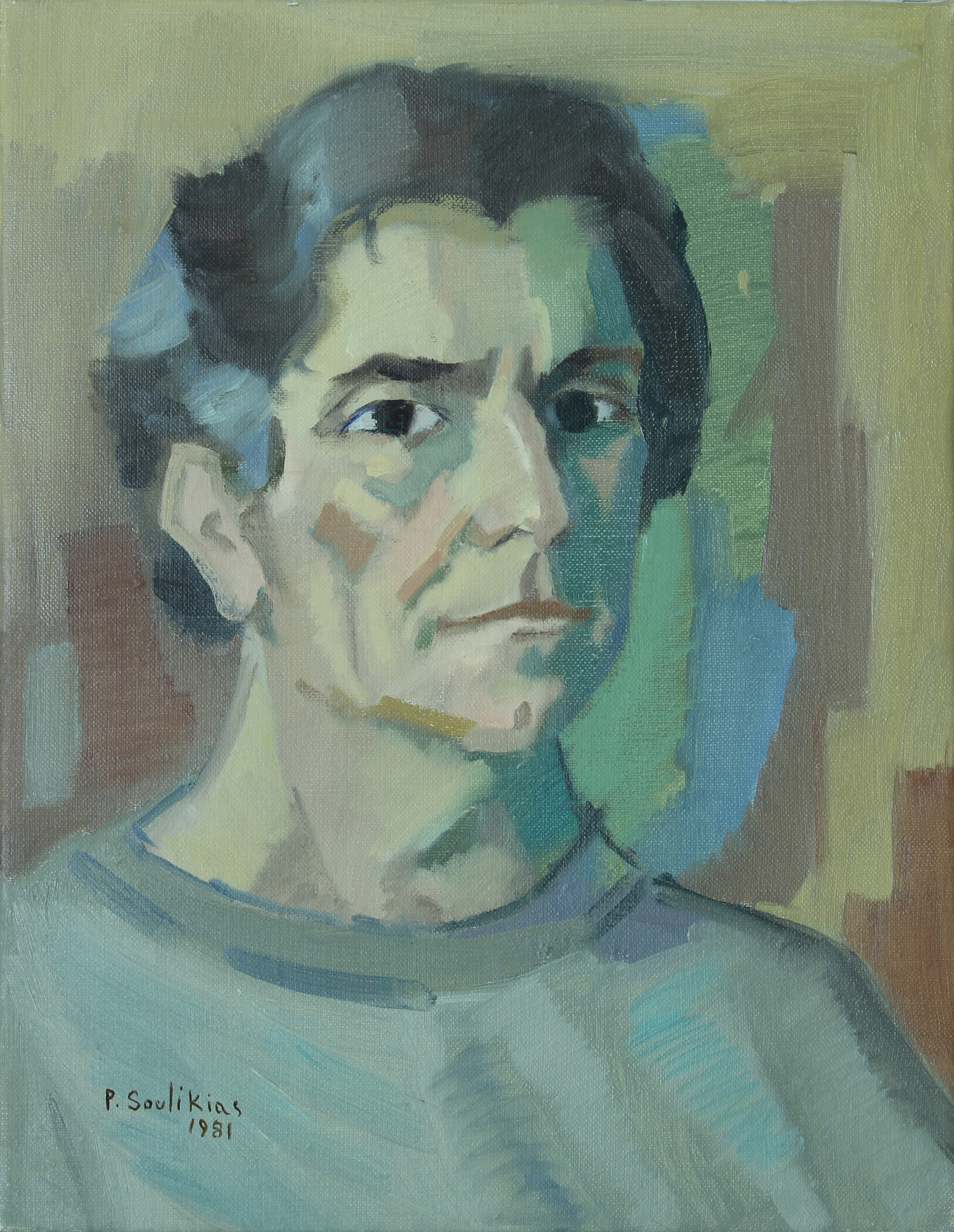
- A 1981 self-portrait by Soulikias
- Born: Παλαιολόγος Σουλικιάς; 13 October 1926; Komotini, Second Hellenic Republic
- Died: 17 January 2023 (aged 96); Larissa, Greece
- Known for: Painting
- Notable work: Canadian landscapes
- Spouse: Helen Kantza

Paleologos Soulikias (Παλαιολόγος Σουλικιάς; 13 October 1926 – 17 January 2023) was a Greek-Canadian painter, known primarily for his Canadian landscape scenes.

== Biography ==
Soulikias was born in Komotini, Greece on 13 October 1926, and raised in Volos. After the hardships of the German Occupation and the Greek Civil War, he spent time studying art in Athens and in Paris and ultimately settled in Montreal in 1959. His value as an artist-painter was first recognized in 1965 at a competition among Neo-Canadians, where he received the first prize. During the same year, Soulikias participated in the exhibition for Quebec artists, organized by the City of Montreal and was invited by mayor Jean Drapeau to sign the city's Golden Book. He then exhibited his recent works on the Laurentians at the Galerie de la Place for which The Montreal Star art critic Michael Ballantyne praised him and spoke of his 'ravishing harmonies'.

In 1966, Soulikias was married to educator Helen Kantza and began dedicating himself fully to painting by rendering artistically the Canadian autumn and winter.

By 1967, his paintings were shown in known Montreal galleries such as the Galerie Moos Inc. and Galerie Gauvreau and in 1968 he began a long collaboration with Galerie L'Art français. On one of his exhibitions there, art critic Hélène Ouellet wrote:

...by his grasp of landscape, this European artist is renewing the rich tradition of the Group of Seven and of all those Canadian artists who have made nature their guide and inspiration.

By 1974, he began his association with The Dominion Gallery and in 1982 the gallery's owner, Dr Max Stern offered him a joint exhibition together with sculptor Henry Moore which was associated with the presentation of a book on Paul Soulikias' works published in the Marcel Broquet Signatures series. Since then, he has exhibited his works in Montreal, Quebec City, Toronto, New York, Athens and elsewhere in Canada, the USA and Greece.

A second book was published in November 1996 for which an exhibition was held at the Montreal Museum of Fine Arts. In 1997, the Canadian Embassy in Greece organized an exhibition for Soulikias in Thessaloniki as part of Canada's representation in that city's European Capital of Culture events. In 2004, he was honoured by the Olympic City of Nea Ionia with an exhibition as part of the cultural events of the Athens 2004 Olympic Games.

For the exhibition in October 2006 to mark the artist's eightieth birthday, the art critic Robert Bernier wrote:

Paul Soulikias did not only last but has also contributed to the adventure of painting of the twentieth century in Quebec...and continues.

Soulikias died of pneumonia in Larissa, Greece, on 17 January 2023, at the age of 96.

== Work ==
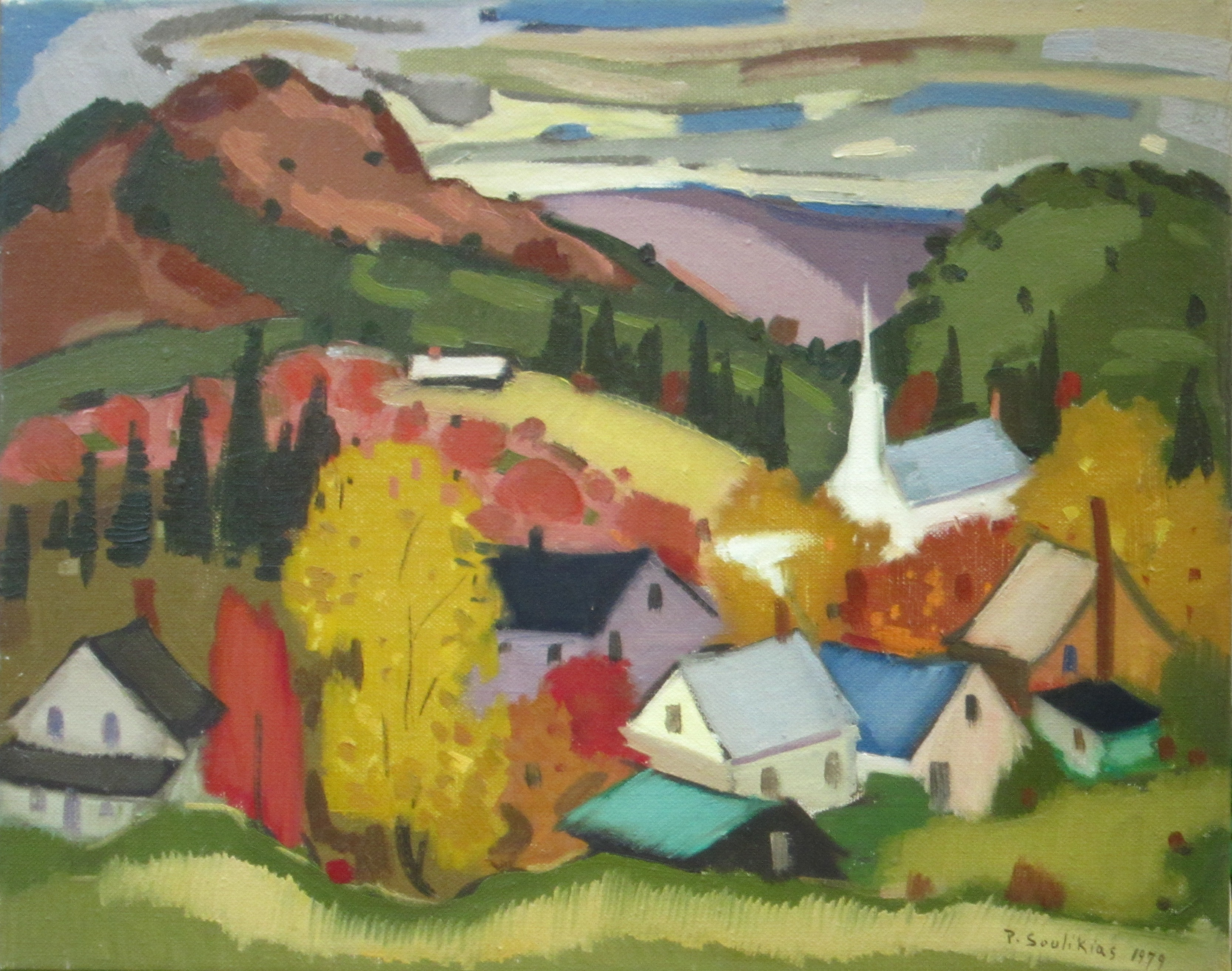
Fall in the Townships

Paul Soulikias was a figurative artist painter with influences from expressionism. Critics have repeatedly praised his colour harmonies and composition as opposed to detail, his warm tones and personal style. Apart from the Laurentians, his work had been informed by several travels, primarily in Greece, the Northeastern United States and the Maritimes as well as from his visit to Mexico in 1982. A large number of his paintings are still lifes and portraits, chiefly female. Although the majority of his work is in oil colours, he had also worked in gouache, watercolours, charcoal and mixed media.

His paintings are shown in galleries in Montreal and in the city's Museum of Fine Arts. They are also in many public and private institutions such as the Musée national des beaux-arts du Québec, City of Montreal, Reader's Digest, Telephone Quebec, Gazoduc TQM, ABB Group, Thiro Ltee, the National Bank of Greece and others as well as in many private collections throughout Canada, the USA and Europe.

== Exhibitions ==
- 1956 Tourist Office, Volos Greece
- 1963 Galerie La Mansard, Montreal
- 1965 Galerie de la Place, Montreal
- 1967 Eaton's Gallery, Montreal
- 1969 Artists' Association, Chicoutimi
- 1970 University of Ottawa (with the cooperation of Wallack Gallery)
- 1971 Galerie L'art français, Montreal
- 1972 Artists' Association, Rockport, Massachusetts
- 1973 Galerie L'art français, Montreal
- 1974 M.Vaianos Cultural Centre, Athens
- 1975 Galerie L'art français, Montreal
- 1975 Galerie d'art Montcalm, Quebec City
- 1977 Galerie L'art français, Montreal
- 1978 Galerie d'Artagnan, Quebec City
- 1978 Centre Culturel de Verdun
- 1979 Galerie L'art français, Montreal
- 1980 Galerie L'art français, Montreal
- 1982 Dominion Gallery, Montreal
- 1983 K.G. Heffel Gallery, Vancouver
- 1984 Kasspar Gallery, Toronto
- 1984 G.Press & T.O., New York
- 1984 Galerie d'art Clarance Gagnon, Montreal
- 1985 Galerie d'art Vincent, Ottawa
- 1985 Kreonidis Gallery, Athens
- 1987 Galerie d'art Rimouski (unveiling of P.Soulikias' painting featured on the front cover of the Quebec City Telephone Directory)
- 1989 Wilfert's Hambleton Galleries, Kelowna
- 1992 Galerie d'arts contemporains, Montreal
- 1995 Melas Mansion of the National Bank of Greece, Athens
- 1996 Giorgio de Chirico Cultural Centre, Volos, Greece
- 1997 Museum of Fine Arts, Montreal
- 1997 Picture Gallery of the Polytechnic School of Thessalonica, Thessaloniki Cultural Capital of Europe
- 1997 Porphyrogeneion Foundation, Agria, Volos, Greece
- 1997 Centre of Contemporary Art, Larissa, Greece
- 2001 Margonis Art Gallery, Larissa, Greece
- 2001 Municipal Picture Gallery, Karditsa, Greece
- 2004 Metaxourgio, Nea Ionia (Olympic City for the 2004 Olympics, Volos, Greece
- 2005 Municipality of Sparta
- 2006 Galerie Lamoureux Ritzenhoff, Montreal
- 2007 Giorgio de Chirico Cultural Centre, Volos, Greece
- 2008 French Institute, Larissa
- 2009 Honorary exhibition by the Prefecture of Magnesia at the Cultural Centre of Nea Ionia, Volos, Greece
- 2016 Honorary exhibition by the Ark of Magnesia at the Cultural Centre of Nea Ionia, Volos, Greece

== Sources ==
- Ballantyne, Michael (1965). 'Civic Support For The Arts'. The Montreal Star. 10 January.
- Ballantyne, Michael (1965). 'A Short Stroll For The Visual Arts'. The Montreal Star. 10 July.
- Ballantyne, Michael (1965). 'A Fresh Look At The Laurentians'. The Montreal Star. 4 December 18.
- Bernier, Robert. (2006). 'Paul Soulikias: Imposer ses harmonies'. Parcours: Art & art de vivre.(12)3,52-53.
- Ouellet, Hélène (1971). 'Paul Soulikias'. "Vie Des Arts". no.63, 71.
- Paul Soulikias: exhibition. (2004). Volos: Cultural Department of Nea Ionia's City Hall-Magnesia. (Pamphlet)
- Paul Soulikias. (1997). Thessaloniki: Thessaloniki Cultural Capital of Europe 1997. (Pamphlet)
- Roussan de, Jacques, eds. (1996). Paul Soulikias. Montreal: Roussan éditeur. ISBN 9782921212243 (2921212242).
- "Steppin' Out" (1982). CBC television Montreal Channel 6. 25 November.
- Waller, Adrian. (1982). P. Soulikias / texte Adrian Waller; préface Jean Brouillet; traduction en français Marie-Sylvie Fortier-Rolland. La Prairie, Quebec: Éditions Marcel Broquet. ISBN 2890000605.
