= Arthur Dominique Rozaire =

Canadian artist (1879–1922)

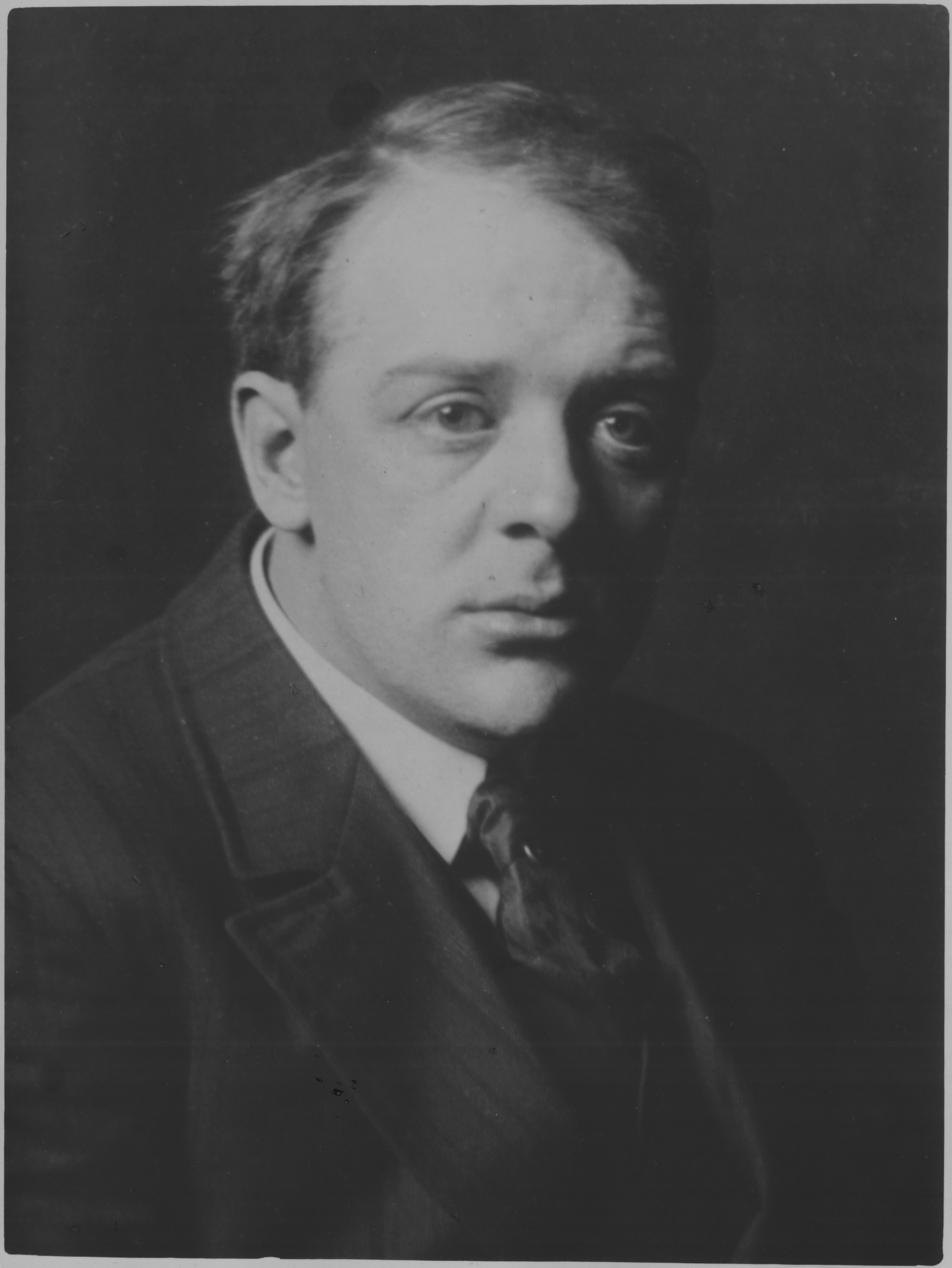
- Born: Arthur Dominique Rosaire; January 17, 1879; Montreal, PQ
- Died: February 26, 1922 (aged 43); Los Angeles, California
- Education: Quebec Council of Arts and Manufactures at Monument National with Edmond Dyonnet; Art Association of Montreal (AAM) with William Brymner and Maurice Cullen
- Spouse: Margaret Isabella Stroud (m. 1903)
- Elected: Canadian Art Club (1910); Associate member, Royal Canadian Academy of Arts (1915)

Arthur Dominique Rozaire (January 17, 1879 – February 26, 1922) was a Canadian impressionist painter, who painted landscape, and a photographer. His personal form of Impressionism, using broad expressive brushstrokes, evolved from Maurice Cullen, one of his teachers. He changed the spelling of his last name in the paintings he signed due to a misprint in an Art Association of Montreal Spring show catalogue of 1900.

== Career ==
Arthur Dominique Rozaire was born in Montreal and studied at the Quebec Council of Arts and Manufactures at the Monument National in Montreal with Edmond Dyonnet. Upon graduation, Rozaire continued his studies at the Art Association of Montreal (AAM) with William Brymner and Maurice Cullen. Cullen took him sketching in the Laurentians and introduced him to Impressionism. He exhibited his work at the Art Association of Montreal Spring Shows (1900–1917), the Royal Canadian Academy of Arts (1907–1920) and with the Canadian Art Club (1908) where he was invited to be a member in 1910. He was a dedicated Impressionist painter with a lush handling and heavy impasto in his sketches.

In 1915, he was diagnosed with tuberculosis and in 1917, moved with his wife and children to Los Angeles to find a more congenial climate than Canada. There, he discovered an enthusiastic art community and acceptance by art critics, one of whom - Anthony Anderson - wrote of him in 1921:

". . . Mr. Rosaire differentiates the seasons with remarkable sureness of hand, especially in his Canadian subjects. Here [in California] he is more 'realistic', if I may use that often misused word, though in the nice discriminations of his realism he never loosens his firm, yet tender, clasp on idealism on the poetical…His poetry dwells first in his choice of subject, second in his handling of it. His feeling is as exquisite as his sight is keen. All this in Canada, but not always in California, where the glory of our sunshine has bewitched him to such an extent that nothing but feeling seems to be left - hence perhaps, the picture that he calls 'Poetic Emotion'.

Rozaire was active in art circles around the area and served as a judge for the California Art Club as well as renewing his friendship with William Henry Clapp in 1922. But on February 26, 1922, at the age of forty-three, Rozaire developed pneumonia and died, leaving his wife and six children. His work is represented in the following public collections: National Gallery of Canada, the Montreal Museum of Fine Arts, the Musée national des beaux-arts du Québec, Art Gallery of Hamilton, Confederation Centre Art Gallery, The RiverBrink Art Museum, and the California Art Club. He died in 1922 and is buried in California.

The Papers of Arthur D. Rozaire are in the Huntington Library, Art Collections & Botanical Gardens, California. In 1996, Katherine Hallingan and Janet Blake wrote Arthur Dominique Rozaire: Poet With A Brush (West Hollywood, CA: George Stern Fine Arts) about the artist. In 1920–1922, his work was included in the National Gallery of Canada's travelling exhibition Canada and Impressionism: New Horizons.

== Bibliography ==
- Prakash, A.K. (2015). Impressionism in Canada: A Journey of Rediscovery. Stuttgart: Arnoldsche Art Publishers. ISBN 978-3-89790-427-9.
