= John Young Johnstone =

Canadian Impressionist painter (1887-1930)

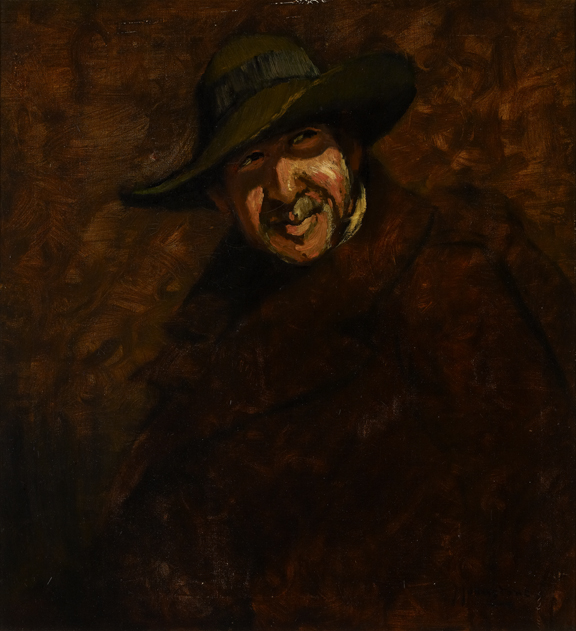
- Self-portrait, c. 1916
- Born: John Young Johnstone; November 12, 1887; Montreal, Quebec, Canada
- Died: February 13, 1930 (aged 42); Havana, Cuba
- Known for: Painter
- Movement: Impressionism

John Young Johnstone (November 12, 1887 – February 13, 1930) was a Canadian Impressionist painter, known for his paintings of life in city, town or countryside, as well as for scenes of Montreal's Chinatown.

== Biography ==
Johnstone is considered to be one of the more enigmatic of the Canadian Impressionist painters. With no contemporary texts about his life, myths and speculations have filled that void.

Johnstone's training as an artist followed the path of other Montreal artists of his generation. In 1905–1910, he studied with William Brymner at the Art Association of Montreal, then in Paris, France at the Académie de la Grande Chaumière in 1911–1915 with Lucien Simon and Émile-René Ménard. In Paris, where he shared a studio with Adrien Hérbert, he painted a number of small Impressionist cityscapes and landscape in the French countryside, Switzerland and Belgium. Upon his return to Canada, he chose as his subject matter observations of life in Quebec. His paintings were well received and he showed intermittently in the annual spring shows of the Art Association of Montreal until 1925 and with the Royal Canadian Academy from 1918 to 1923. He was made an associate member of the latter in 1920.

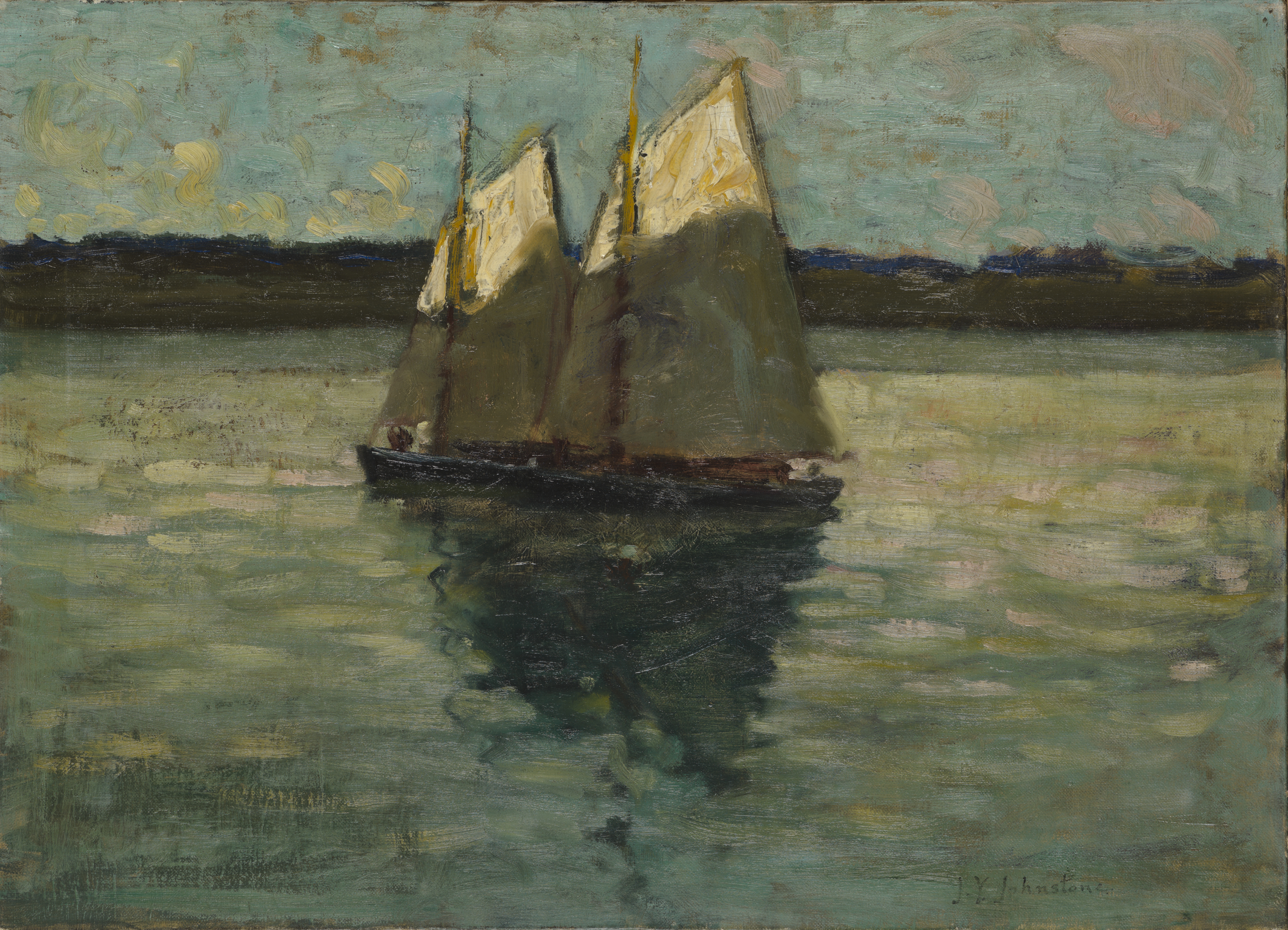
Soleil sur les voiles, created between 1910 and 1928

Johnstone was noted by institutional collectors and as a sign of support, the National Gallery of Canada bought six of his canvases in his lifetime. Moreover, he received critical acclaim. In 1925, art critic, Newton MacTavish, suggested he was among the very fine painters of the day in his book, The Fine Arts in Canada. He was a member of the Beaver Hall Group which had its first exhibition in 1921, of the Pen and Pencil Club of Montreal and of the Arts Club of Montreal.

In 1921, he inherited from his mother a pre-Confederation townhouse at 781 University Street (now 3533) and proceeded to transform the upper floor to a six metre high studio where he painted and lived with friends until his departure for Cuba. To supplement his income Johnstone taught at the Conseil des arts et manufactures, at the Monument-National from 1918 to 1928 and various art schools. In 1928, he was expelled from the Arts Club of Montreal.

In 1930, he moved to Cuba, where he died destitute six weeks later in Havana. The cause of his death is described both as "after a brief illness" and as the result of a "duel over a woman".

== Style and work ==
Johnstone's paintings were of life in city, town or countryside, as well as scenes of Montreal's Chinatown and portraits. A self portrait in the collection of the Robert McLaughlin Gallery, shows him with a handsome, half-smiling visage looking up attentively at something over the viewer's shoulder but accounts of his fits of depression and a resulting habit of heavy drinking suggest a darker side to his personality. His particular gift was a subtle gloom in his paintings, and one writer suggests that he could not maintain the sense of compression he achieved in his small panels in his large canvases. He is considered one of the first true Moderns among Canadian artists at the beginning of the 20th century.

=== Works ===
- Le Marché Bonsecours au crépuscule, 1910?, Musée national des beaux-arts du Québec
- Quai des Augustins, Bruges, 1915, National Gallery of Canada
- Start Another, 1915, gouache, Agnes Etherington Art Centre
- Un coin du Marché Bonsecours, Montréal, 1915, Musée national des beaux-arts du Québec
- Café d'or, Paris, 1916?, Musée national des beaux-arts du Québec
- Indienne au Marché Bonsecours, 1916, Montréal, Musée national des beaux-arts du Québec
- Bonsecours Market, 1916, National Gallery of Canada
- Jacques Cartier St., Montreal, 1917, Art Gallery of Greater Victoria
- Arrière-cour d'une vieille maison de la rue Saint-Vincent, Montréal, 1919 or 1920, Musée national des beaux-arts du Québec
- Self Portrait, c.1916, The Robert McLaughlin Gallery
- Deux femmes de Caughnawaga, 1930, Musée d'art contemporain de Montréal
- In Havana, 1930, Art Gallery of Hamilton
- Le Soleil sur les voiles, 1910–1928, Musée national des beaux-arts du Québec
- Paysage au ciel jaune, 1910–1928, Musée national des beaux-arts du Québec
