= Douglas Brymner =

Canadian civil servant (1823–1902)

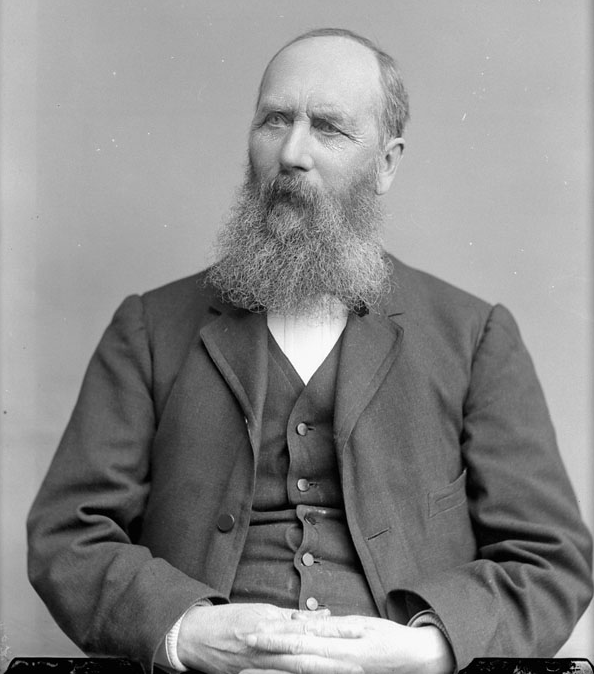
- Douglas Brymner, 1892
- Born: July 3, 1823; Greenock, Scotland
- Died: June 19, 1902 (aged 78); New Westminster, British Columbia, Canada
- Children: William Brymner; George Douglas Brymner

Douglas Brymner (July 3, 1823 – June 19, 1902) was a Canadian politician, journalist, civil servant and archivist.

Born in Greenock, Scotland, Brymner immigrated to Canada in 1857 with his wife and son settling in Melbourne, Lower Canada. He served two terms as mayor of Melbourne before moving to Montreal in 1864 where he became editor of the Presbyterian and joined the editorial staff of the Montreal Herald. In 1872, he moved to Ottawa where he worked as Senior Second Class Clerk in charge of archives for the Department of Agriculture. In 1872, he was appointed the first Dominion Archivist, a position he held until his death in 1902. In 1895, he was elected a fellow of the Royal Society of Canada. In 1898 he was elected a member of the American Antiquarian Society.

== Creation of Canadian Archives and Appointment of Brymner, 1872 ==
After Canadian Confederation in 1867, there was a major push led by the Literary and Historical Society of Quebec for a national archive; it was a deemed as necessary for the Canadian government to create an archive because of the relationship between archives, history, national consciousness and national unity. A petition had been signed by more than fifty leading authors and scholars that urged parliament to create a repository of historical archives where archives could be collected, maintained, arranged and accessible to scholars for reference. The petition was strongly endorsed by the Canadian Library Committee and was transfer to the Minister of Agriculture who at the time was responsible for arts and manufactures. The petition was then put into action and in 1872 Canadian Parliament voted a sum of $4000 to the creation. Parliament appointed Douglas Brymner, then a noted journalist, as Senior Second Class Clerk and was responsible to oversee and create a national records repository and undertake general archival responsibilities.

== First Year as Senior Second Class Clerk, 1873 ==
Brymner, given the task of creating a Canadian Archives and was allocated, as reported later, an empty room and vague instructions; in starting, there was no single document with any description. Brymner approached his new position with much enthusiasm though and in his first year visited Toronto, Montreal, Quebec, Halifax, Saint John and Fredericton, reporting on the state of various accumulations of government records. In doing so, he captured his first major collection of records. In Halifax records of the British Army from the conquest of Canada in 1759 to the withdrawal of garrison in 1871 were found and transferred to Ottawa. These records, estimated at 400,000 items were the first major accession for the new archives.

== Brymner's Notable Acquisitions, 1873-1902 ==
Brymner's notable acquisitions and contributions to the archives consisted of the making of calendars of the Bouquet and Frederick Haldimand Papers, the state papers of Lower Canada from 1761 to 1838, Upper Canada from 1791 to 1838, Nova Scotia from 1603 to 1801, New Brunswick from 1784 to 1801, Prince Edward and Cape Breton Islands from 1763 to 1801, and those relating to Hudson's Bay from 1673 to 1759. By 1883 the holdings of the archival branch contained 1, 063 volumes of British military records, 197 volumes of Canadian civil and military records, 189 volumes of copies of private military records from the British Museum, 450 maps and charts, 1, 395 books and 24 volumes of miscellaneous private papers.

== Brymner’s Vision for Canadian Archives ==
Brymer’s greatest role was his setting the standard, goals and concept for future archivists. After spending time in Britain, and Paris from 1881 to 1883, Brymner became influenced by the European archival system and sent memorandum on government records in Europe. He also urged for the creation of a new building to house archives.

In 1882, Brymner had started to develop this role for Canadian Archives and emphasized the importance of documenting all aspects of Canadian society, rejecting any gearing towards political life. In an Archives Report in 1882, he wrote: "The special object of the office [Canadian archives]… is to obtain from all sources, private as well as public, such documents as may throw light on social, commercial, municipal as well as purely political theory."

It was Brymner’s goal to create an archive that looked past the traditional archival function as an administrative governmental body. Brymner wanted to archives to act as an information repository that took in information from various sources in which created a robust information repository that reflected Canadian heritage and life in general. Later, in a report for the American Historical Association, he wrote "My ambition aims at the establishment of a great storehouse of the history of the colony and colonists in their political, ecclesiastical, industrial, domestic, in a work every aspect of their lives. It may be a dream, but it is a noble dream."
