= Newton MacTavish =

Canadian journalist and art critic

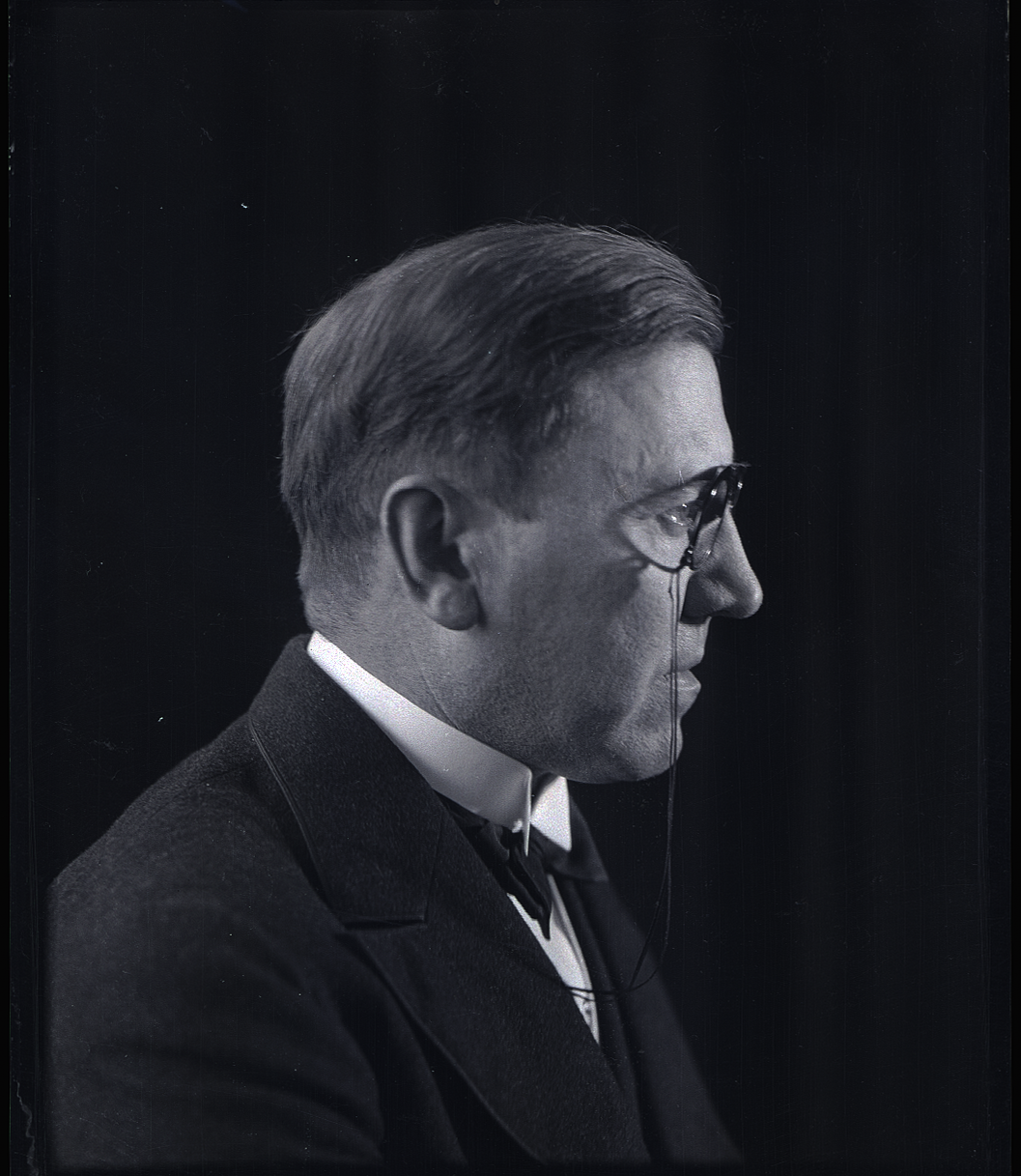
MacTavish in 1926

Newton McFaul MacTavish (February 19, 1875 – August 17, 1941) was a Canadian journalist and art critic.

== Early life and education ==
Newton McFaul MacTavish was born on February 19, 1875, in Staffa, Ontario, a community in West Perth, Ontario.

He was educated by private tutors and at McGill University.

== Career ==
MacTavish joined the staff of The Globe in 1899 and became its Montreal correspondent in 1903.

Beginning in 1906, he was the editor of the Canadian Magazine.

On June 27, 1926, MacTavish was named a member of Canada's federal civil service commission, now the Public Service Commission of Canada. Before his appointment, he had been a trustee of the National Gallery of Canada and Acadia University.

MacTavish died on August 17, 1941, in Toronto.

== Publications ==
=== Books ===
- Thrown In. Macmillan. 1923. OCLC 1157938952.
- The Fine Arts in Canada. MacMillan. 1925.
- Ars Longa. Ontario Publishing Company. 1938.

=== Articles ===
- "A Renaissance of Art in Canada". Art and Progress. 2 (11): 318–325. 1911. ISSN 2151-2531. JSTOR 20560470.
