= John Little (Canadian painter) =

Canadian artist (1928–2024)

John Geoffrey Caruthers Little
- Born: February 20, 1928; Montreal, Quebec, Canada
- Died: October 29, 2024 (aged 96)
- Other names: John Geoffrey, John Geoffrey Caruthers
- Known for: painter of urban Montreal

John Little RCA (February 20, 1928 – October 29, 2024) was a Canadian artist, known as the chronicler of the urban heritage of his home city of Montreal in oils.

== Life and career ==
Little was born in Montreal on February 20, 1928. After studying at the École des beaux-arts de Montréal and with the Art Students League of New York (where he met Ray Bailley and helped to illustrate the Bruce Gentry comic strip), Little joined Luke & Little, his family's architectural practice in 1951, working as a draftsman. After his marriage in 1953 he made painting his primary profession, and showed his work at the Watson Art Gallery. Besides painting, he illustrated covers for Maclean's Magazine.

Little joined the Royal Canadian Academy as an associate member in 1961 and became a full member in 1973. His work is held in many public collections such as the National Gallery of Canada, the Beaverbrook Art Gallery, the Leonard & Bina Ellen Art Gallery at Concordia University, and the Montreal Museum of Contemporary Art.

After Little died, his archive of 11,000 photographs of Montreal city streets was handled by Craig Klinkhoff of Klinkhoff Gallery in Montreal, his long-time dealer.
