= Marc-Aurèle Fortin =

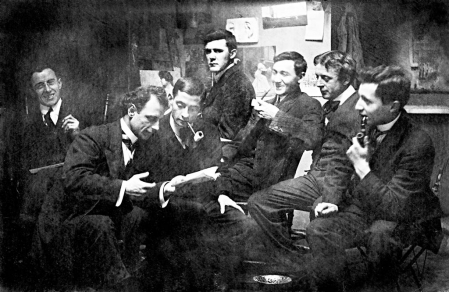
- Born: 14 March 1888; Sainte-Rose, Quebec
- Died: 2 March 1970 (aged 81); Macamic, Quebec

For the electoral district see Marc-Aurèle-Fortin.

Marc-Aurèle Fortin RCA (French pronunciation: [maʁk ɔʁɛl fɔʁtɛ̃]; March 14, 1888 – March 2, 1970) was a Québécois painter, known best for paintings that convey the charm of small-town Quebec.

== Career ==
Marc-Aurèle Fortin was born in 1888 in Ste-Rose, Quebec, son of Thomas Fortin. He studied in Montreal under Ludger Larose and Edmond Dyonnet, then under Edward J. Timmons at the Art Institute of Chicago. Upon his return to Montreal in 1914, Fortin held various jobs and painted in his spare time. It was in 1920, after a short trip to England and France, that he began to seriously paint and exhibit his works. He was known for painting landscapes of the St. Lawrence Valley, which he travelled around by bicycle. Fortin appreciated Quebec history, the life of the rural villages (as did Jean Paul Lemieux) and landscape, saying "Just like the French, we must excel in landscape".

He was part of the first Atelier art school exhibition at Henry Morgan Galleries in Montreal in April 1932 together with Atelier co-founders John Goodwin Lyman and André Biéler. Edwin Holgate also was in the show. His first solo show was at the Art Association of Montreal in 1933. In 1935, after an inspirational trip to France, he began to apply pure colour onto a black surface which initiated his so-called 'black period' based on an Oriental carpet he saw with a black background. In his later years, he participated in numerous international exhibitions and held solo exhibitions at the Musée du Québec (1944), in Almelo, Netherlands (1948), the Montreal Museum of Fine Arts (1954), and at the National Gallery of Canada (1963). His work was shown in Montreal in the Galerie L'Art français from about 1945 and in the Walter Klinkhoff Gallery. Today, it is shown in the Alan Klinkhoff Gallery and Rookleys Canadian Art Gallery.

Fortin won the Jessie Dow prize from the Art Association of Montreal (1938), a bronze medal at the New York World's Fair (1939), and was an Associate of the Royal Canadian Academy. He died in 1970.

== Recognition ==
On 22 May 1981, Canada Post issued 'Marc-Aurèle Fortin' designed by Pierre Fontaine in the Canadian Art series. The stamps are based on a painting À la Baie Saint-Paul (1937), by Marc-Aurèle Fortin in the Musée national des beaux-arts du Québec, Québec, Quebec. The 17¢ stamps are perforated 12.5 mm and were printed by Ashton-Potter Limited

The electoral district Marc-Aurèle-Fortin is named in his honour. He was designated a National Historic Person by the federal environment minister, on advice of the National Historic Sites and Monuments Board.

A street is named in his honour in Saint-Charles-Borromée as well as in Sainte-Rose, Québec.

A film was made of his life titled Marc-Aurèle Fortin, 1888-1970 by Nanouk Films Ltée, distributed by Cinéma Libre, c. 1983.

== Exhibitions since the 1970s ==
- Dimanche à l'Ile Sainte-Hélène, Musée du Québec, exhibition not dated
- Collections d'Artistes, Place des Arts, Montreal, 1979
- Les Esthétiques modernes au Québec 1916-1946, National Gallery of Canada, 1982
- Musée Marc-Aurèle Fortin, Exhibition, 1984
- Marc-Aurèle Fortin Retrospective Exhibition, Galerie Walter Klinkhoff, September 2006
- Marc- Aurèle Fortin: The Experience of Colour. Musée National des Beaux-Arts du Québec, 2011

== Legacy ==
In 2007, the Musée Marc-Aurèle Fortin donated its entire collection to the Montreal Museum of Fine Arts.
