= Robert Pilot =

Canadian artist

Robert Wakeham Pilot MBE DCL RCA
- Born: 9 October 1898; St. John's, Newfoundland
- Died: 17 December 1967 (aged 69); Montreal General Hospital, Quebec, Canada
- Education: Académie Julian
- Occupation: Painter
- Spouse: Patricia Dawes

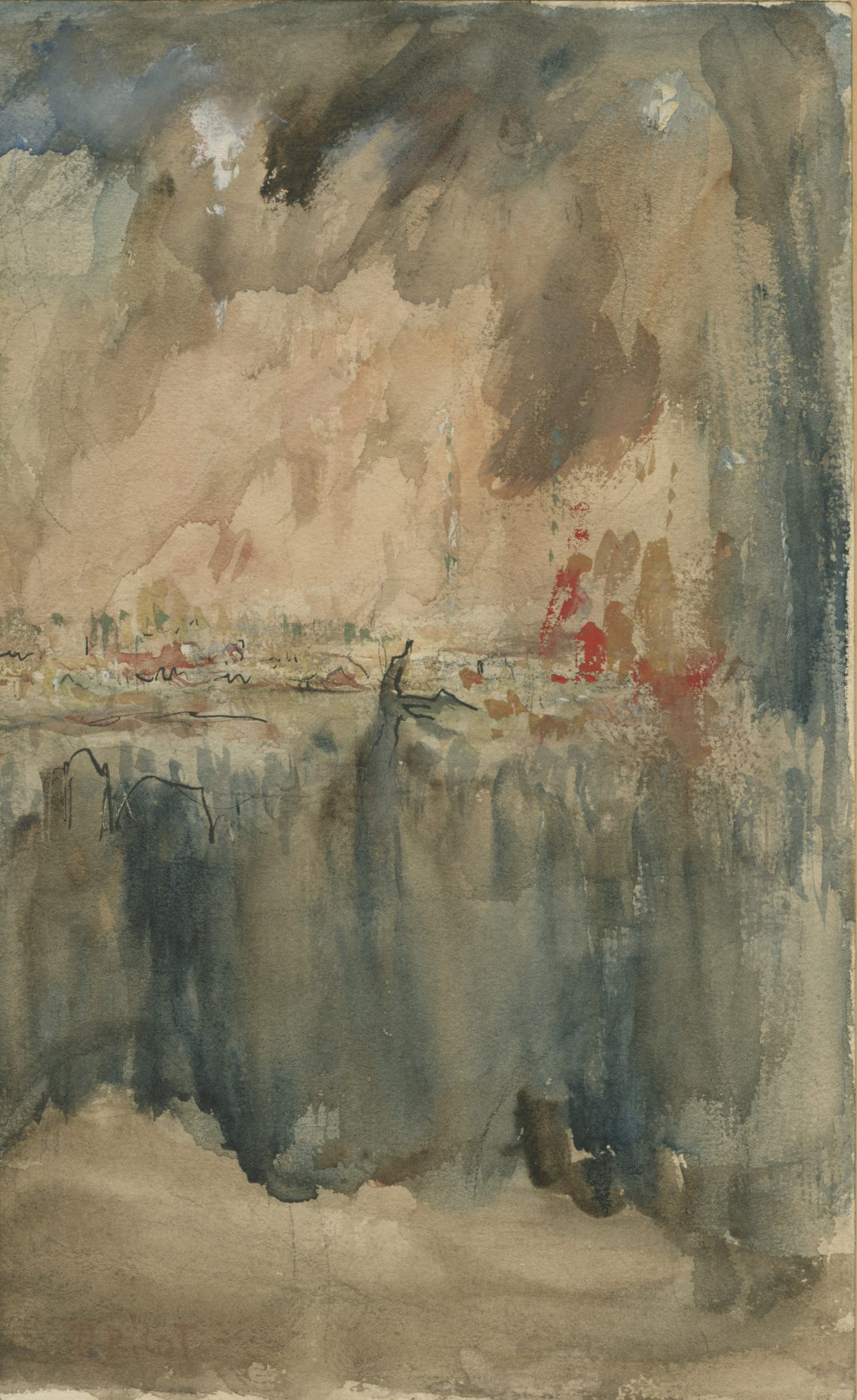
War Scene

Robert Wakeham Pilot DCL MBE RCA (9 October 1898 – 17 December 1967) was a Canadian artist, who worked mainly in oil on canvas or on panel, and as an etcher and muralist. He is known for his ability to capture the tone and atmosphere, especially at twilight, of the landscape of Quebec. Pilot is the last of the Canadian painters considered "to lend authority to Canadian Impressionism". He also accepted commissions as a book illustrator.

== Career ==
Pilot was born at St. John's, Newfoundland, to Edward Frederick Pilot and his wife Barbara (née Merchant). In 1910, his widowed mother married the artist, Maurice Cullen, moving into Cullen's home in Montreal. As a child, Pilot assisted Cullen in his studio, and the two would take sketching trips together. He later studied in Montreal in night classes of the Monument National where he learned drawing, then attended night classes at the Royal Canadian Academy of Arts with William Brymner, and finally full-time classes with Brymner at the Art Association of Montreal.

In March 1916, he joined the army and served as a gunner on trench mortars in the Canadian Expeditionary Force, Fifth Division Artillery, during World War I. In 1919 he returned to Brymner's classes and there won the Wood Scholarship. From 1920 to 1922, he studied at the Académie Julian in Paris. In 1922, he exhibited at the Paris Salon and was elected a member of the Société Nationale des Beaux-Arts.

On returning to Canada, he was elected an associate of the Royal Canadian Academy of Arts in 1925, full member in 1935, and served as the academy's president from 1952 to 1954. The subject he preferred to paint was the urban landscape, particularly that of Quebec. He was influenced by Cullen's interpretation of Impressionism and also by Camille Pissarro and James Wilson Morrice because they had to his mind the appropriate balance of form and atmosphere.

His first solo show was in 1927, at the Watson Art Galleries. He won the Jessie Dow Prize at the Art Association of Montreal in that year and in 1934. In 1938 he became professor of Engraving at the École des Beaux-Arts, Montreal and continued in this capacity until 1940.

He re-enlisted in 1941, during World War II, serving as a captain in The Black Watch. He was mentioned in dispatches while in Italy, which resulted in him being made a Member of the Order of the British Empire (MBE) in 1944.

Pilot held his first Toronto solo show in 1948 at the Laing Galleries. In 1953, he was elected a member of the National Academy of Design in the U.S.A; in the same year Bishop's University in Sherbrooke, Quebec conferred on him the degree of Doctor of Civil Laws (Honoris Causa). He was also awarded the Queen Elizabeth II Coronation Medal in 1953.

Paintings by Pilot were presented to Winston Churchill and to Queen Elizabeth II and the Duke of Edinburgh. Others are in the collection of the National Gallery of Canada and the Musée national des beaux-arts du Québec. Although he did at least three murals in Quebec, it is his 1953 mural for the Canadian Pacific Railway that is most widely known.

Pilot died at Montreal General Hospital on 17 December 1967, and was survived by his wife Patricia (née Dawes) and son, Wakeham. A retrospective exhibition of his work was held at the Montreal Museum of Fine Arts in 1968. In 1988, the Walter Klinkhoff Gallery in Montreal held another retrospective.

== Selected public collections ==
- Royal Collection Trust;
- National Gallery of Canada;
- Musée national des beaux-arts du Québec.
- Sobey Art Foundation;

== Selected public collections ==
- Musée de la civilisation;
- Art Gallery of Hamilton;
- Museum London;
- Canadian War Museum;

Cultural offices
Preceded by A. J. Casson (1948-1952)	President of the Royal Canadian Academy of Arts (1952-1954)	Succeeded by H. L. Allward (1954-1957)
