= René Richard =

Swiss painter (1895–1982)

- Born: René Jeanrichard; 1 December 1895; La Chaux-de-Fonds, Switzerland
- Died: 31 March 1982 (aged 86); Baie-Saint-Paul, Quebec, Canada
- Occupation: Painter
- Known for: Landscapes

René Richard (1 December 1895 – 31 March 1982) was a Swiss-born Canadian painter known for his semi-abstract landscapes of the Canadian wilderness and of the country around Baie-Saint-Paul in Quebec.

== Early years ==
René Jeanrichard (later shortened to René Richard) was born on 1 December 1895 in La Chaux-de-Fonds, Switzerland. His father engraved pocket watches. His mother's family were artists. He had two brothers and four sisters. At the age of eleven René began to work in the watch factory after school. Due to financial difficulties, the family decided to emigrate to Canada, and landed in Quebec City in 1909. At first they stayed in Montreal. René Richard went on to Edmonton, Alberta, in 1910 with his father and brothers, and then to Cold Lake, Alberta, where they began to work the land. Richard's mother and sisters joined them later.

Conditions on the prairies in the early days were brutally demanding, and after some time Richard's father gave up farming. Instead he opened a general store. René Richard helped his father in the store as a teenager, and made trips into the bush to trap furs. René was attracted by the lifestyle of the nomadic First Nations people. From 1913 to 1926, travelling by canoe or by snowshoe, Richard traveled widely in northern Alberta, Saskatchewan, Manitoba and the Northwest Territories. He voyaged down the Mackenzie River to the Beaufort Sea, and lived for a while with the Inuvialuit. On these expeditions he would make sketches of the scenery. Richard studied drawing and painting in Edmonton, Alberta, in 1926.

== Artistic career ==
Richard spent 1927–30 in Paris, where he studied at the Académie de la Grande Chaumière and the Académie Colarossi. While in Paris he met Clarence Gagnon and James Wilson Morrice. Gagnon encouraged him to devote himself to art. After returning to Alberta in 1930, Richard resumed his former career as a trapper. He made hundreds of sketches during his long wilderness journeys. He would depict landscapes and the camps of prospectors and trappers. This was an intensely productive period, when his unique style began to emerge. With little money, often he would draw on butcher's paper cut into sheets.

In 1938 Clarence Gagnon invited him to move to Montreal. That summer he helped Gagnon make an inventory of the work of Horatio Walker, a painter who had recently died, on the Île d'Orléans near Quebec City. They went to Baie-Saint-Paul, Quebec, where they stayed with the Cimons, friends of Gagnon. Gagnon helped René to get seasonal work as a game warden in the Parc de la Montagne de la Table below Mont Albert on the Gaspé Peninsula. Richard was laid off and returned to Baie-Saint-Paul where the Cimons gave him a place to stay in exchange for doing odd jobs. Richard fell in love with Blanche Cimon, the daughter of the family, and they married in 1942.

Richard sold his first paintings in 1943. His first exhibition at L'Art français gallery in Montreal was a great success, and his reputation began to grow. In 1948, Richard joined a McGill University-Canadian Museum of Nature expedition to Quebec's Ungava Peninsula. In 1951, he returned to George River with botanist Jacques Rousseau from the Montreal Botanical Gardens. He produced large landscapes between 1950 and 1965 based on memories of these journeys. In 1957 Richard drove with his wife and Gabrielle Roy across the United States to Mexico. (Note: Richard was the model for Gabrielle Roy's fictional character Pierre Cadorai.) His later work mostly depicted the Charlevoix region around Baie-Saint-Paul.

Richard's landscapes became highly valued by collectors. When Queen Elizabeth II visited Canada in 1959 she was given one of Richard's paintings by the mayor of Chicoutimi. Richard often exhibited in Quebec City and Montreal. The Musée national des beaux-arts du Québec held a solo exhibition of his work in 1967, and a retrospective ten years later. He received the Order of Canada in 1973. In 1980 Richard was elected a member of the Royal Canadian Academy of Arts.

René Richard died on 31 March 1982 at Baie Sant-Paul, aged 86. His autobiography Ma vie passée was published in 1990. He was inducted into the Cold Lake Hall of Fame on January 13, 2024.

== Work ==
René Richard sketched with lead pencil, charcoal, soft lead pencil and red pencil, and painted in oil. He is known for his landscapes, drawn or painted in a semi-abstract style. Unlike other Canadian landscapes, Richard's pictures often included trappers, hunters and the Inuit and First Nations people who lived in the north country, with their homes and sled dogs. Richard donated many of his works to Laval University in 1980. His work is held by museums in Montreal, Québec and La Malbaie. The Musée d'art contemporain de Baie-Saint-Paul holds some of his work. Richard illustrated the novel Menaud maître draveur by Félix-Antoine Savard. One of his works showing the Northwest Territories was used by Canada Post in a series of stamps on Canadian Art.

== Sources ==
- Bousfield, Arthur; Toffoli, Garry (2002-09-01). Fifty Years the Queen: A Tribute to Elizabeth II on Her Golden Jubilee. Dundurn. ISBN 978-1-4597-1435-9.
- "Décès du peintre Richard" (PDF). Le Soleil: A7. 1 April 1982.
- Grace, Sherrill E. (2002-04-15). Canada and the Idea of North. McGill-Queen's Press - MQUP. ISBN 978-0-7735-6953-9.
- "Historique". Musée d'art contemporain de Baie-Saint-Paul'.
- Linteau, Paul-Andre; Durocher, Rene; Robert, Jean-Claude (1991-01-01). "The Triumph of Modernity". Quebec Since 1930. James Lorimer & Company. ISBN 978-1-55028-296-2.
- Pelletier, Esther (2014). "René Richard, peintre paysagiste".
- "René Jean Richard". Heffel's.
- "René Richard (R.C.A.)". Galerie Perreault.
- "Richard, René". Galerie Beauchamp.
