= William Brymner =

Canadian artist (1855–1925)

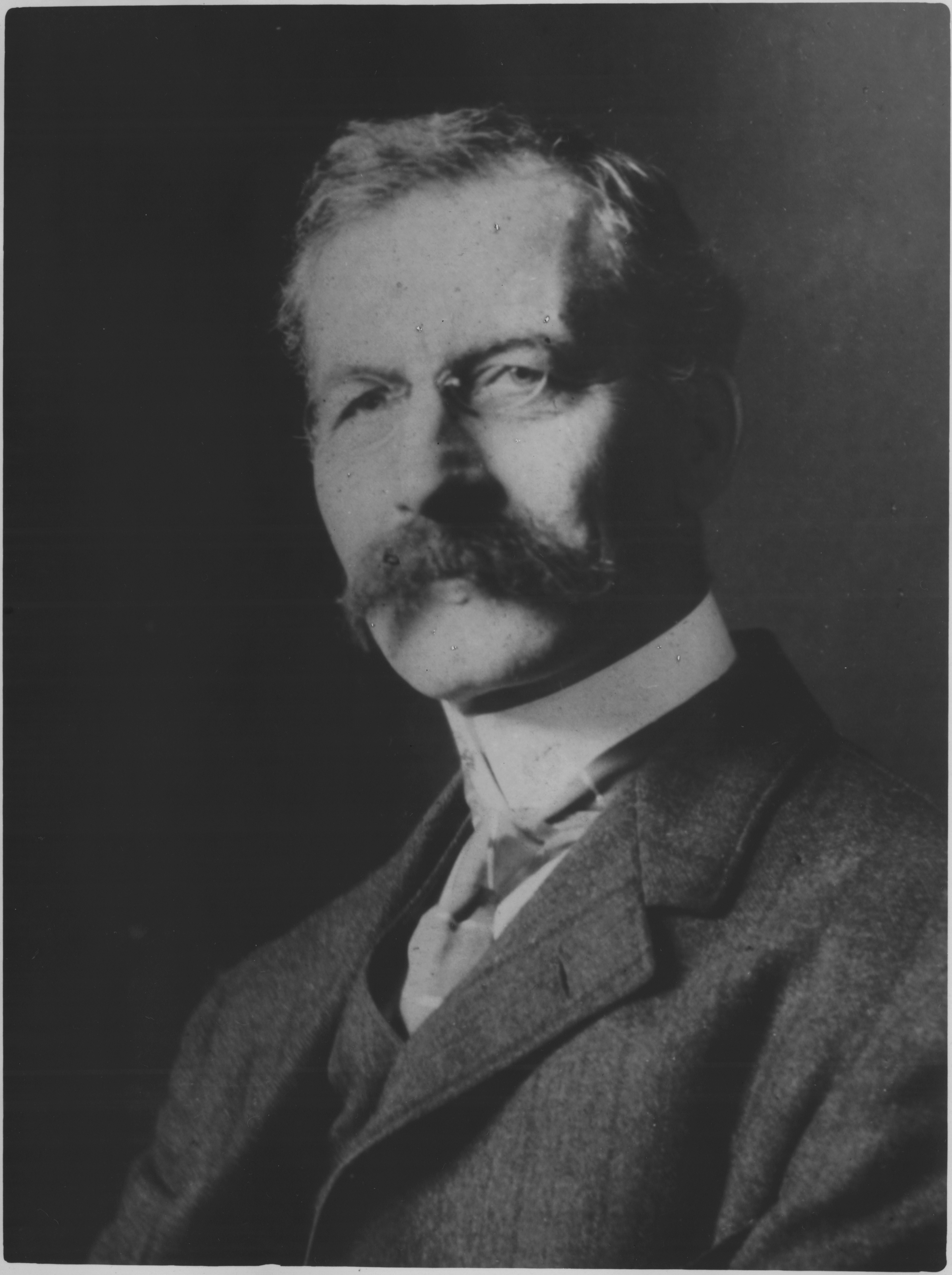
- Portrait of William Brymner
- Born: December 14, 1855; Greenock, Scotland
- Died: June 18, 1925 (aged 69); Wallasey, England
- Education: Académie Julian
- Known for: Painter
- Movement: founding member Canadian Art Club (1907-1915)

William Brymner, CMG RCA (December 14, 1855 – June 18, 1925) was a Canadian figure and landscape painter and educator. In addition to playing a key role in the development of Impressionism in Canada, Brymner taught numerous artists who became leading figures in Canadian modern art.

== Early years ==
Born in Greenock, Scotland, the son of Douglas Brymner the first Dominion Archivist and Jean Thomson, Brymner moved with his family to Melbourne, Canada East in 1857. In 1864, his family moved to Montreal, Canada East. They later lived in the area of Ottawa, Canada West where Brymner attended the Ottawa Grammar School.

Following architectural studies, Brymner enrolled at the Académie Julian in Paris, France, in 1878, where his instructors were William-Adolphe Bouguereau and Tony Robert-Fleury. Both of his teachers were famous exponents of 'Grand manner' naturalism. During this period at the Salon Brymner became interested in the work of Jean-Louis Ernest Meissonier, who was already popular with the French public.

In the spring of 1884, Brymner travelled to Runswick Bay, North Yorkshire, England, with the British artist Frederick W. Jackson (1859–1918) and Scottish-Canadian artist James Kerr-Lawson (1862–1939). It was there that Brymner completed his major works A Wreath of Flowers (1884), which later served as his diploma submission for the Royal Canadian Academy of Arts, and The Lonely Orphans Taken to Her Heart (1884).

In January 1885, Brymner returned to Paris to resume his studies at the Académie Julian. During this time, he created the Barbizon school-inspired landscape painting Border of the Forest of Fontainebleau (1885), which was exhibited at the Paris Salon.

Returning to Canada in 1885, Brymner spent the summer in Baie-Saint-Paul in the Lower Saint Lawrence region of Quebec. There he created his first paintings depicting rural Quebec, a subject he frequently would return to throughout his career.

== Later life ==
In 1886, Brymner settled in Montreal after staying in Paris "on and off for almost seven years." That year, he travelled to Western Canada via the newly completed Canadian Pacific Railway, hoping to take advantage of the fact that the CPR was commissioning landscapes of the Rocky Mountains. Brymner spent several weeks on the Siksika Nation Reserve near Gleichen (now Alberta), where he witnessed the severe hunger of the Siksika People due to the government's failure to provide adequate food rations. This experience culminated in one of Brymner's most haunting paintings, Giving Out Rations to the Blackfoot Indians, NWT (1886).

Upon his return from Western Canada, Brymner began teaching at the Art Association of Montreal, where he would remain for thirty years. Many members of the Beaver Hall Group studied under Brymner, who encouraged them to explore new modernist approaches to painting.

Brymner specialized in figure scenes and avoided large historical subjects except for his paintings of the Canadian Pacific Railway. Two Girls Reading of 1898 displays a careful treatment of light and an understanding of the force of a simple emphatic composition.

== Pupils ==
Among Brymner's pupils were:

- Nora Collyer
- Emily Coonan
- Clarence Gagnon
- Charles Gill
- Prudence Heward
- Randolph Hewton
- Edwin Holgate
- Mabel Lockerby
- John Young Johnstone
- Mabel May
- Helen McNicoll
- Kathleen Morris
- Lilias Torrance Newton
- A. M. Pattison
- Robert Wakeham Pilot
- Sarah Robertson
- Arthur Dominique Rozaire
- Anne Savage
- Ethel Seath

== Recognition and awards ==
In 1883, he was made an associate of the Royal Canadian Academy of Arts (RCA). In 1904, he received a silver medal at the Canadian exhibition at the Louisiana Purchase Exposition. He was elected vice-president of the RCA in 1907 and president in 1909. In 1916, he was made a Companion of the Order of St Michael and St George and could use the honorary prefix C.M.G. after his name.

== Artworks ==
- La Vieille Fileuse, île d'Orléans, 1883, Musée national des beaux-arts du Québec
- A Wreath of Flowers, 1884, National Gallery of Canada
- La Femme au métier, 1885, Musée national des beaux-arts du Québec
- In the Orchard (Spring), 1892, National Gallery of Canada
- Early Moonrise in September, 1899, National Gallery of Canada
- Ile aux Coudres, c. 1900, National Gallery of Canada
- La Vallée Saint-François, île d'Orléans, 1903, Musée national des beaux-arts du Québec
- Evening, 1907, National Gallery of Canada
- Near Louisbourg, Cape Breton, N. S., c. 1909, National Gallery of Canada
- A Young Lady, c. 1910, National Gallery of Canada
- Fog on the Coast, 1914, National Gallery of Canada
- Octobre sur la rivière Beaudet, 1914, Musée national des beaux-arts du Québec
- Jeune Fille au chapeau bleu (La Breloque), 1916, Musée national des beaux-arts du Québec

== Gallery ==
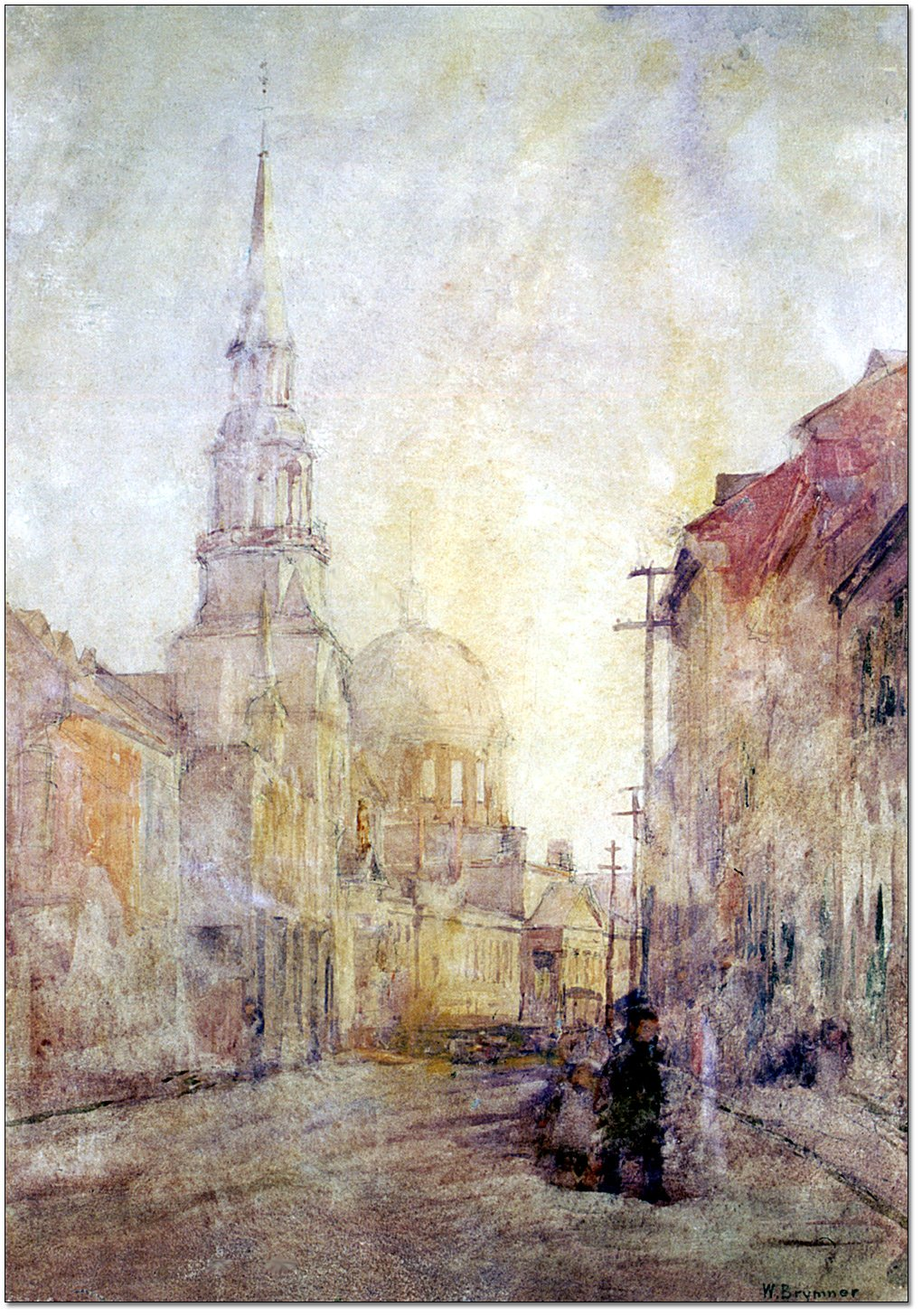
Bonsecours Church and Market, 1913

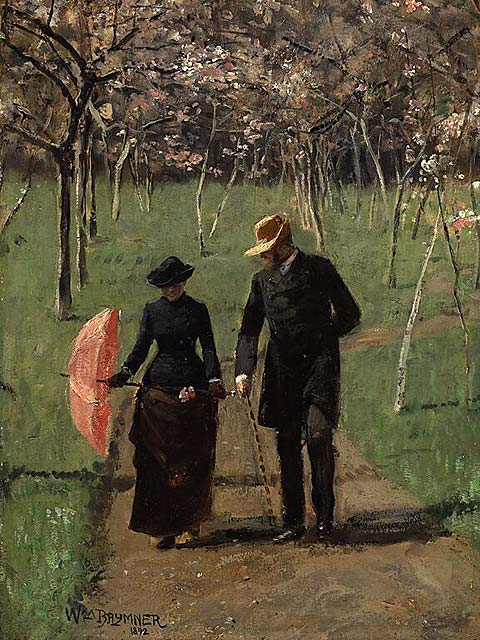
In the Orchard (Spring), 1892, National Gallery of Canada

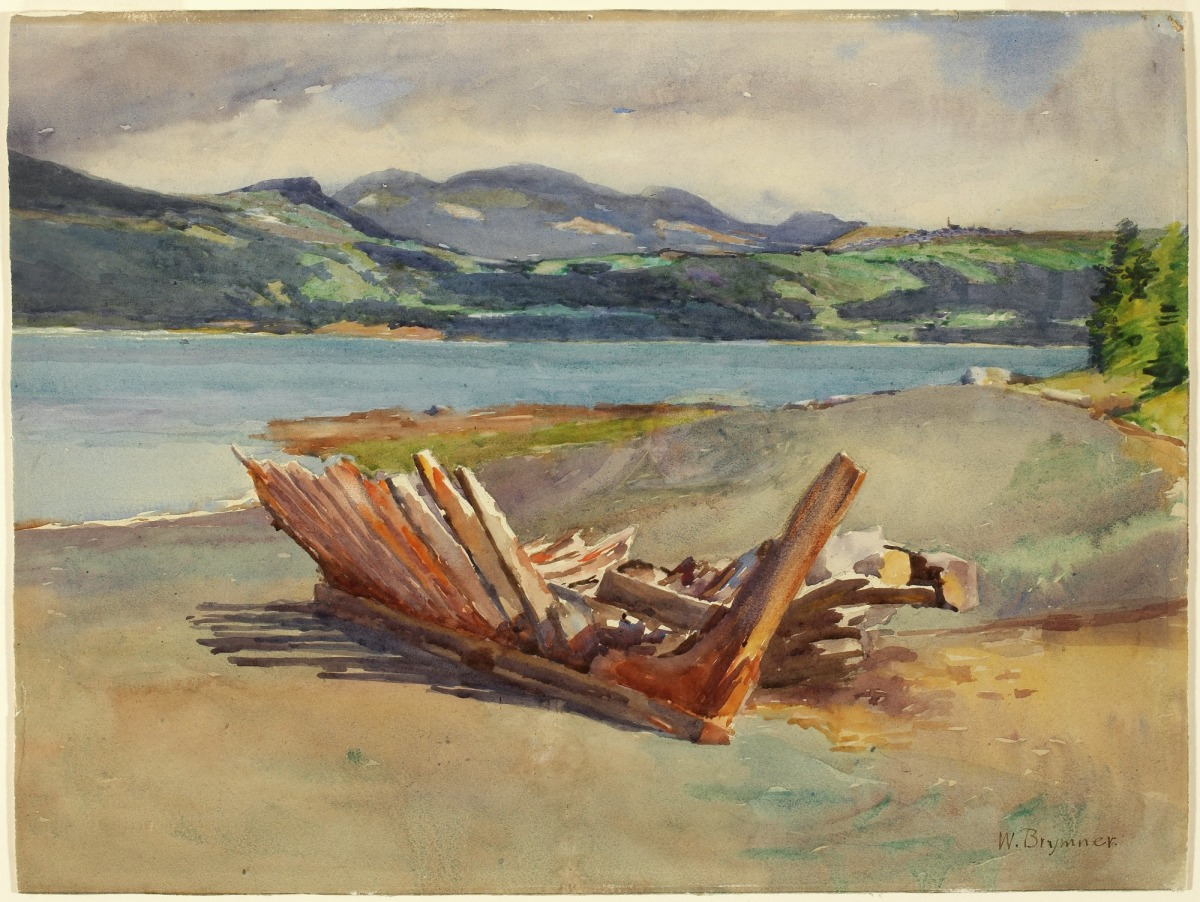
Ile aux Coudres, c. 1900, National Gallery of Canada

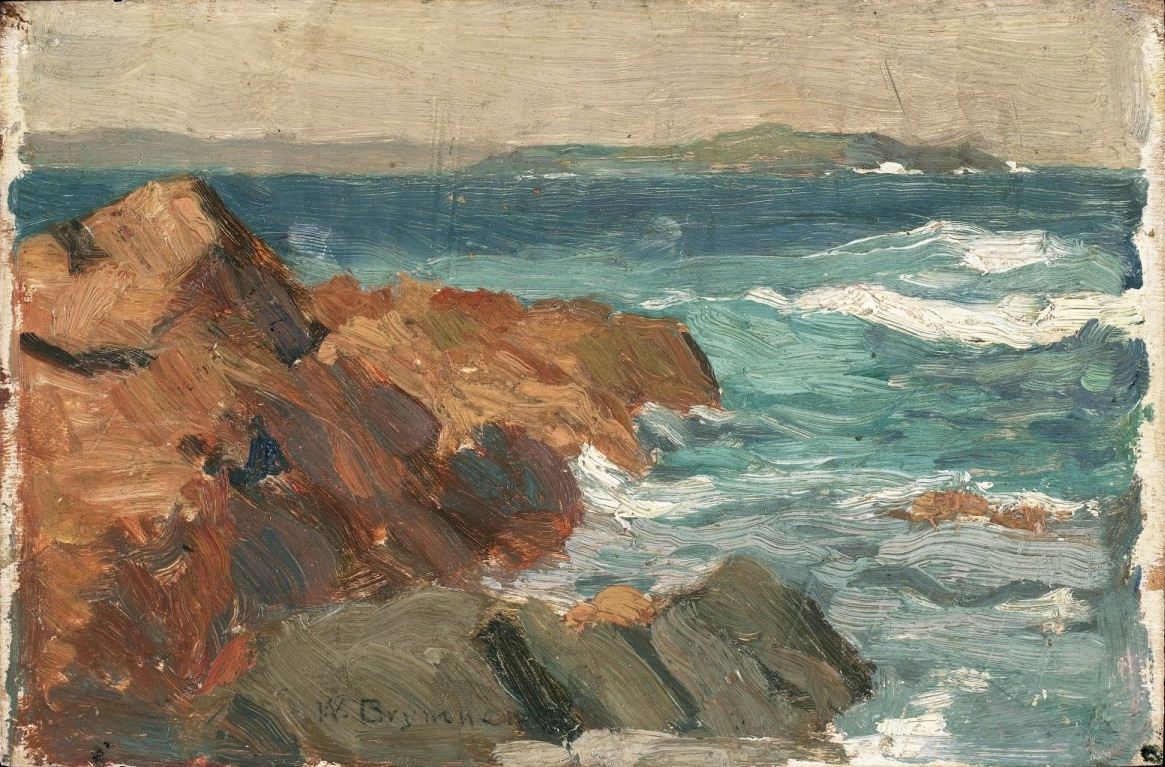
Near Louisbourg, Cape Breton c. 1904–1914, National Gallery of Canada

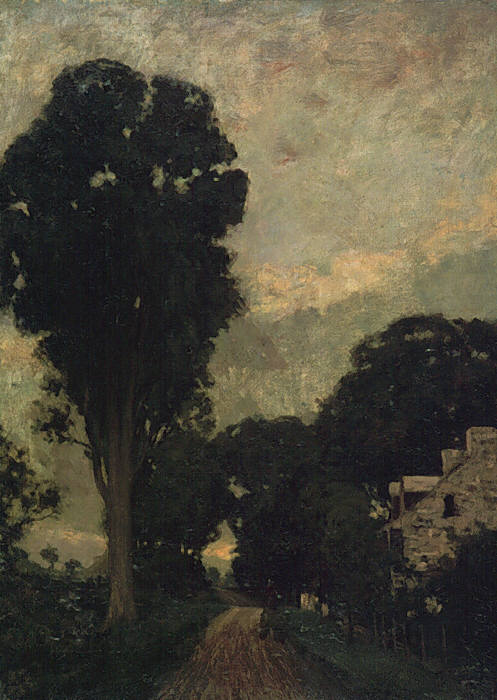
Evening, 1907, National Gallery of Canada

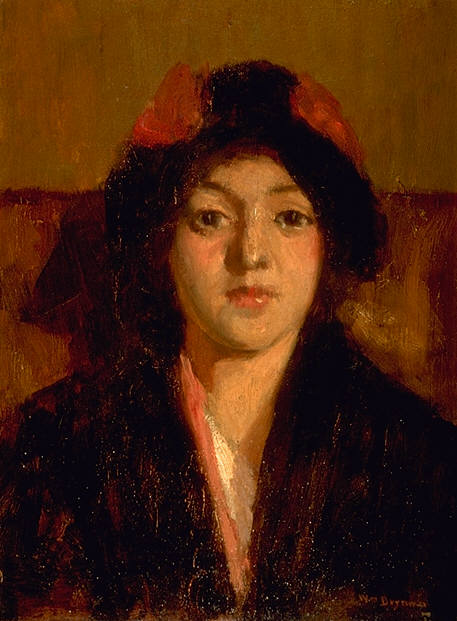
Young Lady, c. 1910, National Gallery of Canada

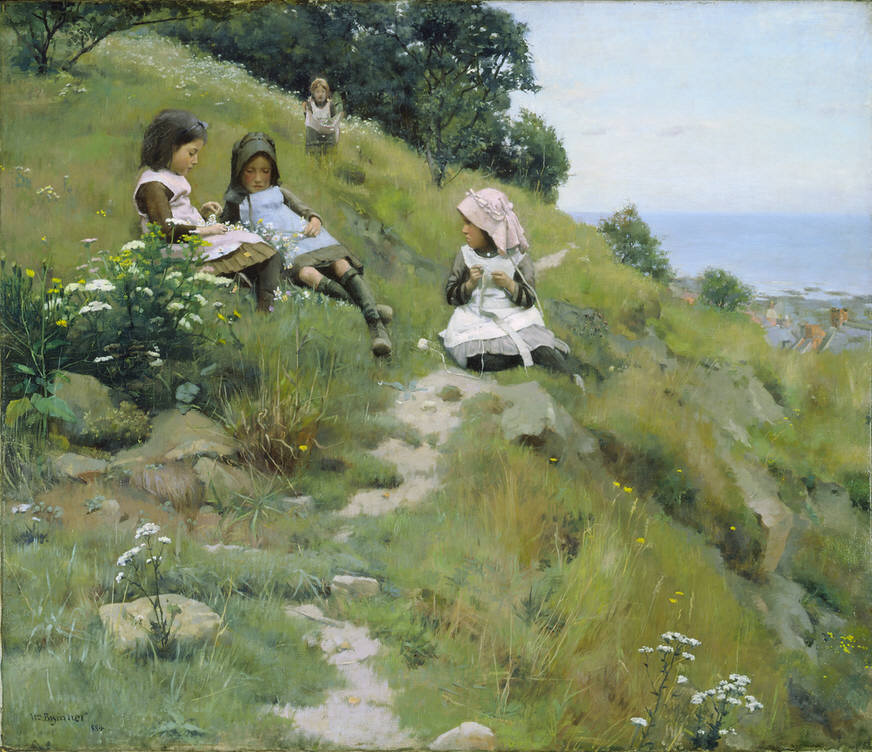
A Wreath of Flowers, 1884.

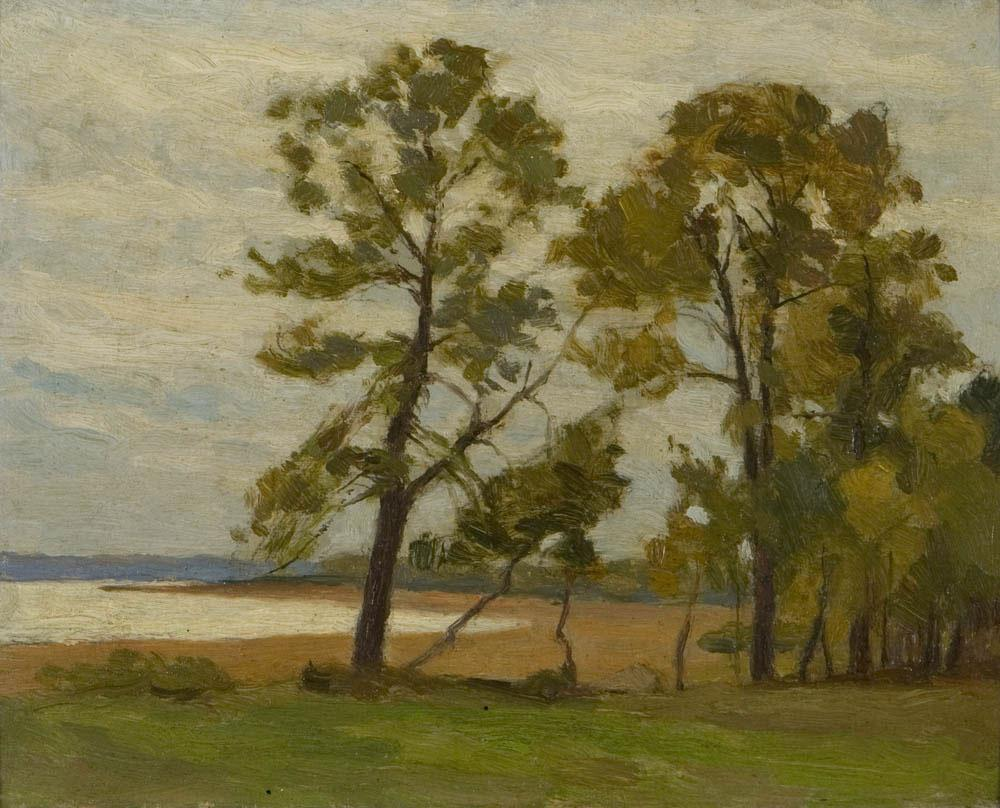
Lakeside view

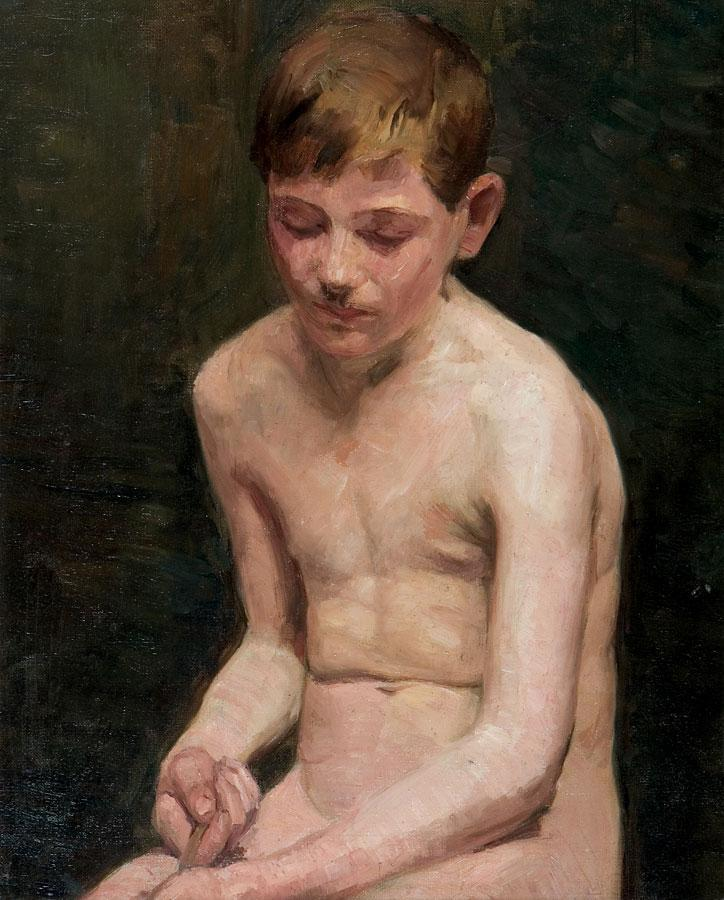
Portrait of a boy

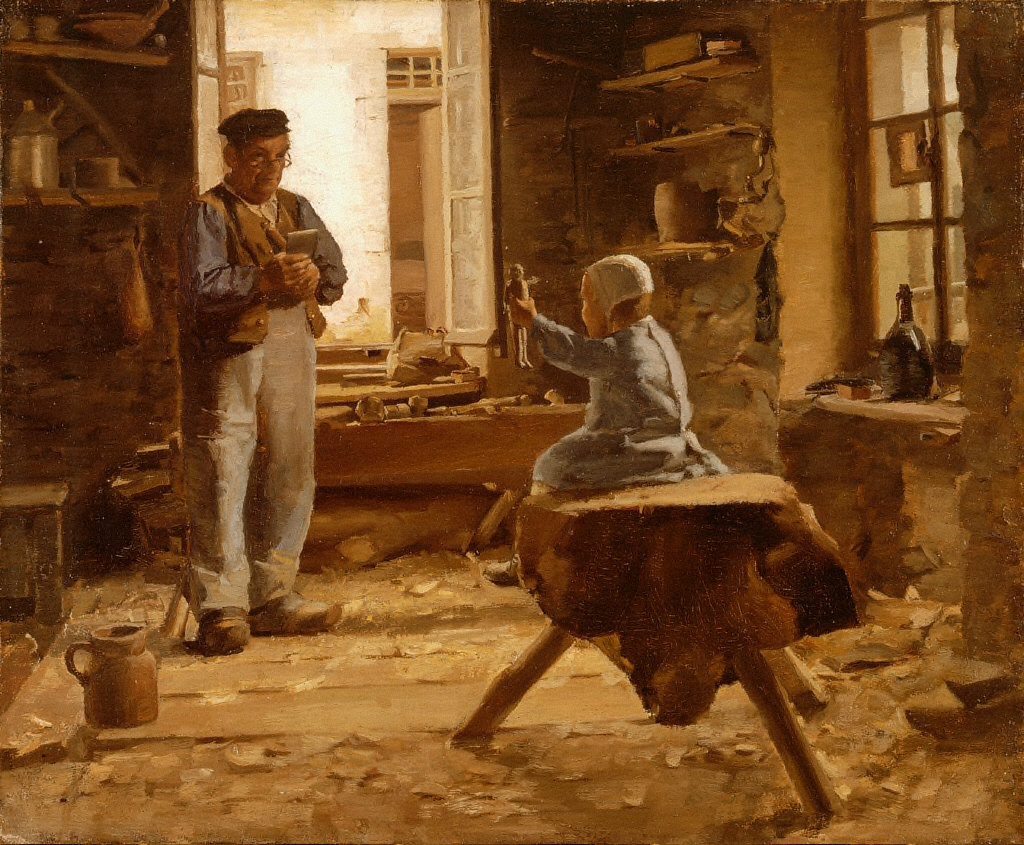
With Dolly at the Sabot-makers, 1883.

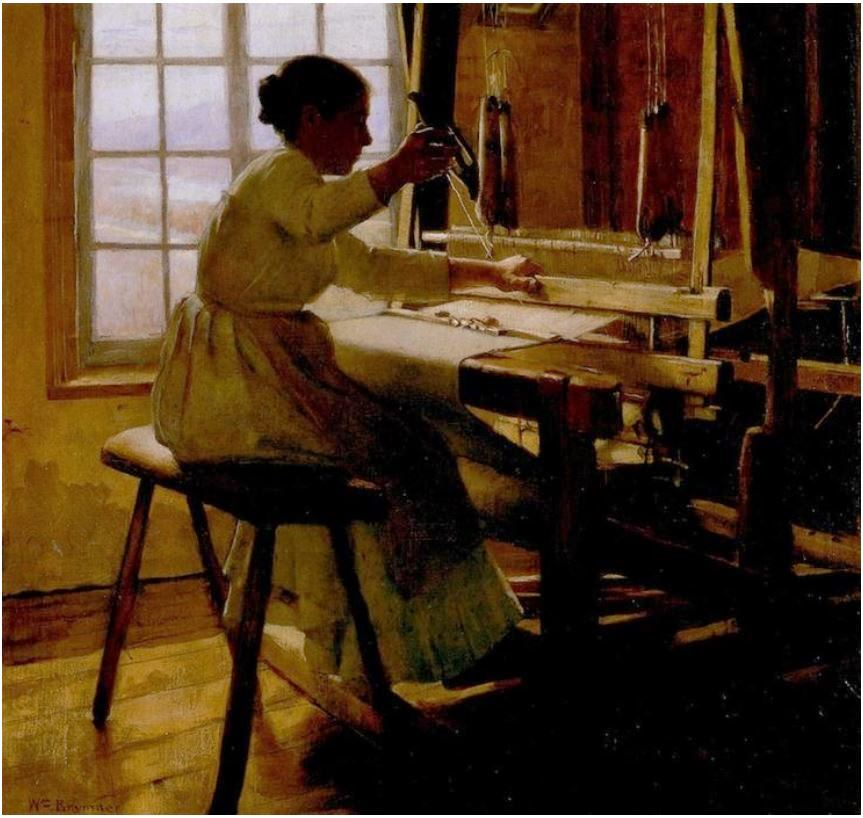
Femme en train de tisser/La Femme au métier, 1885.

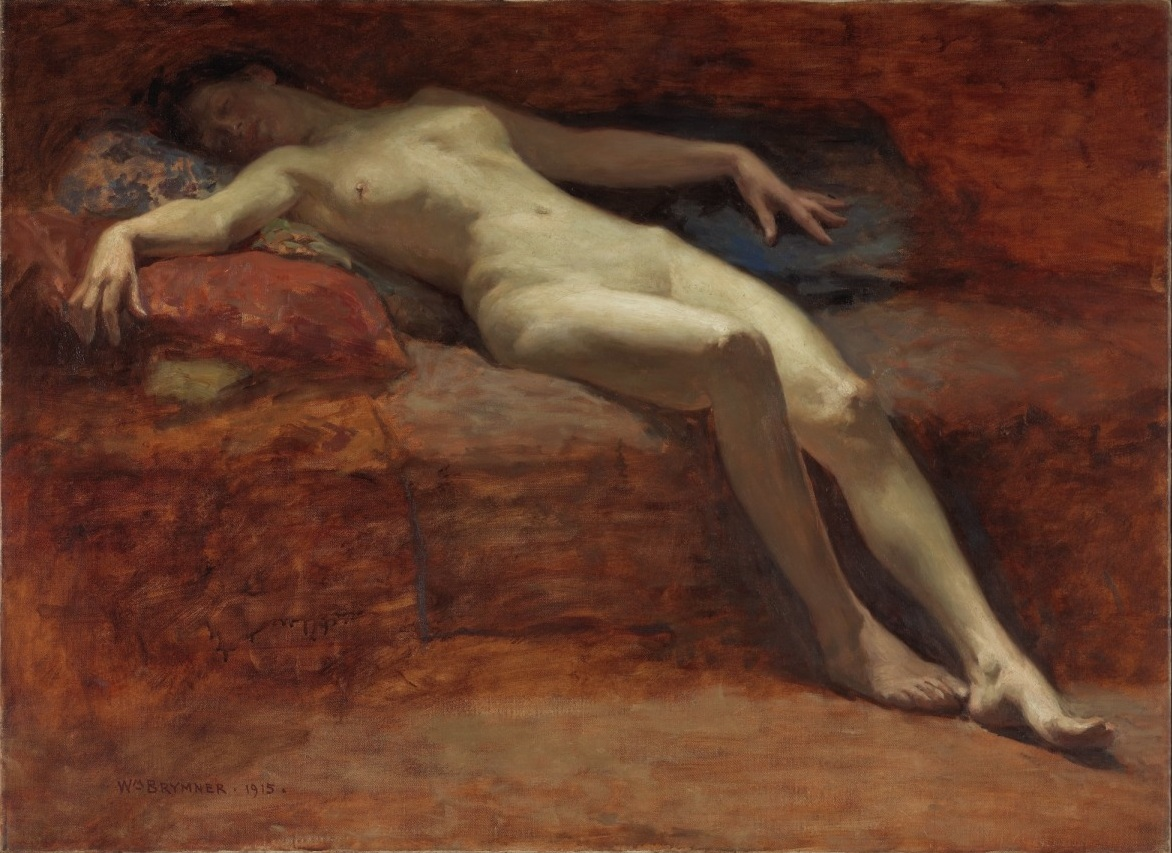
Nude figure, 1951.

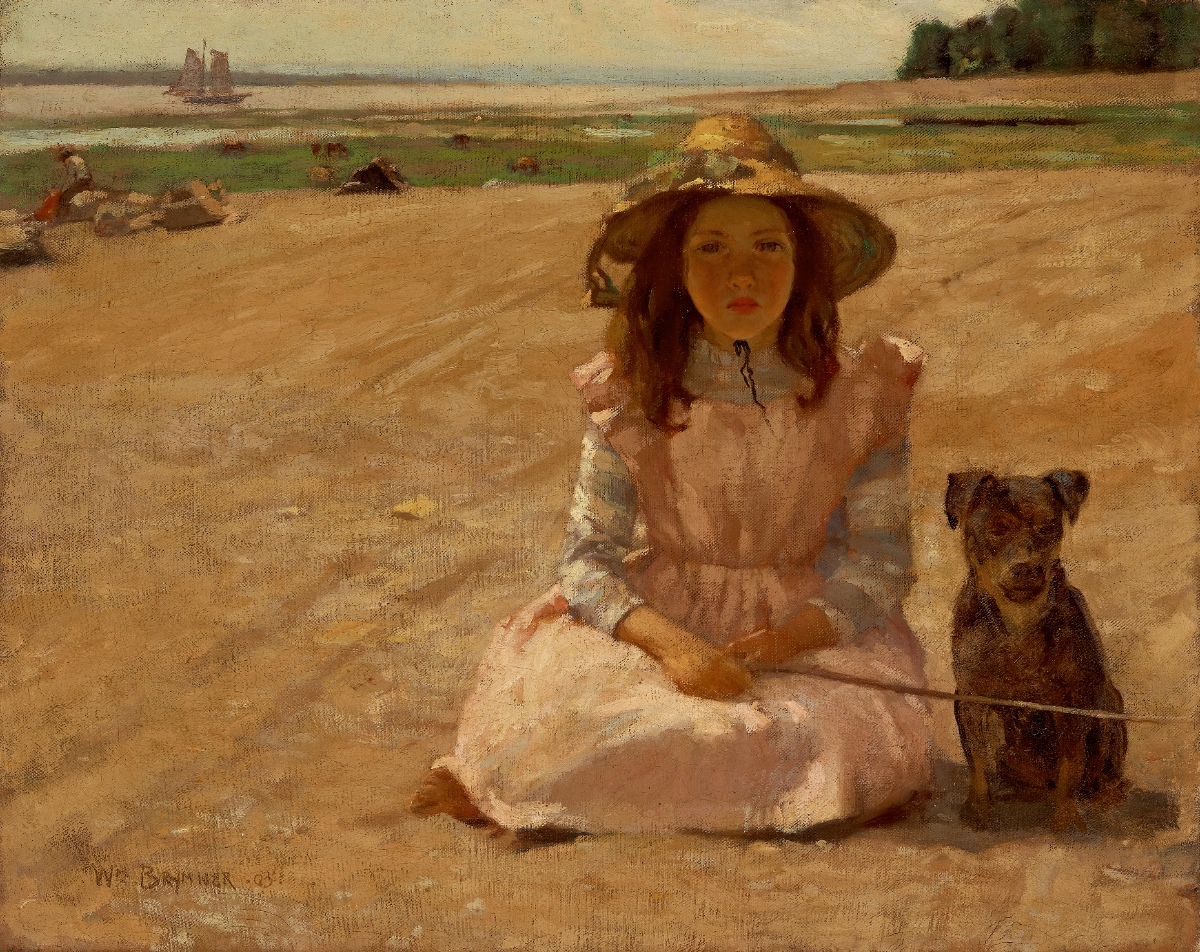
daughter and her Dog, Bas Saint-Laurent/Fillette avec son chien, Bas Saint-Laurent (1905)

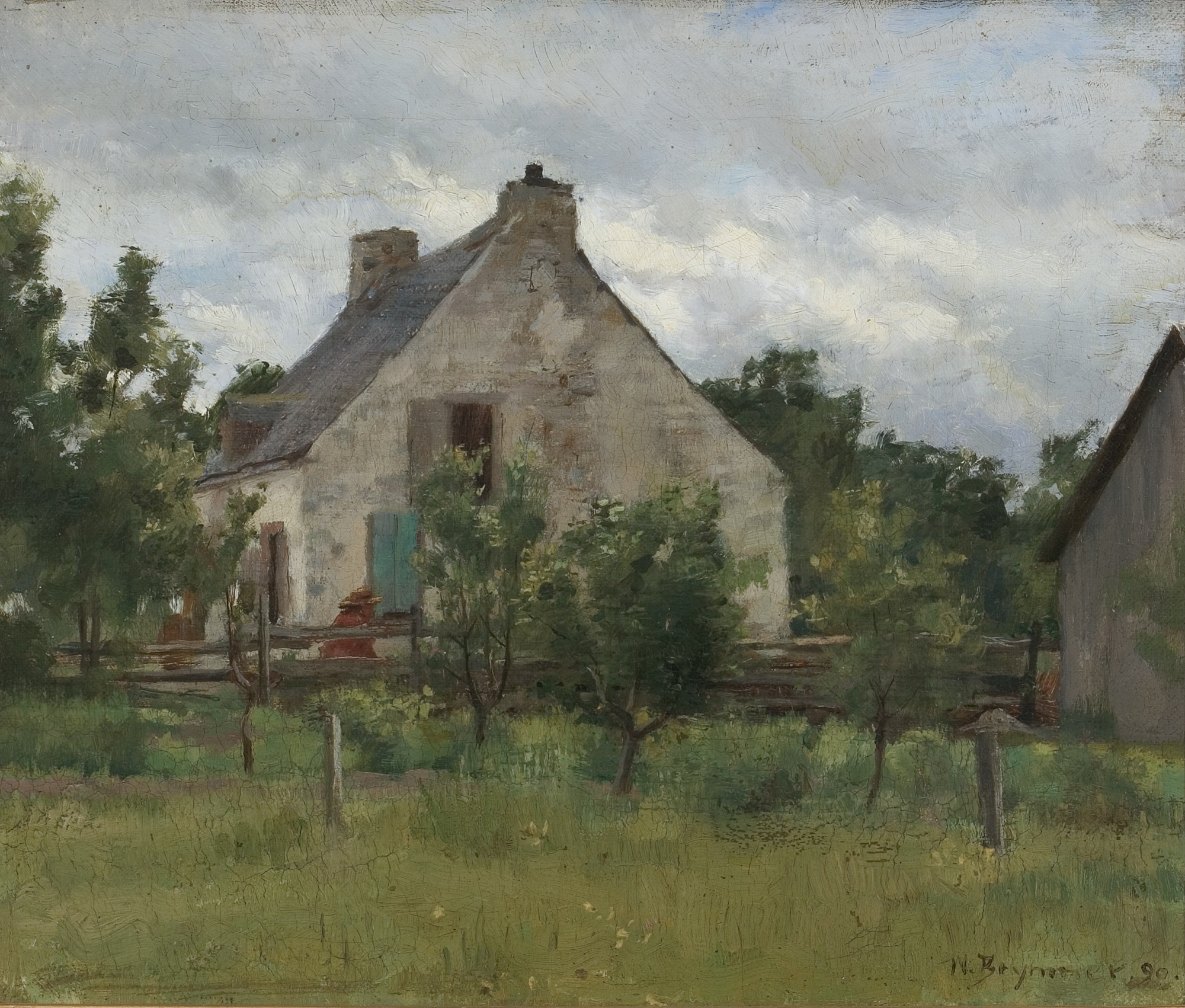
Maison de Champagne, 1890.

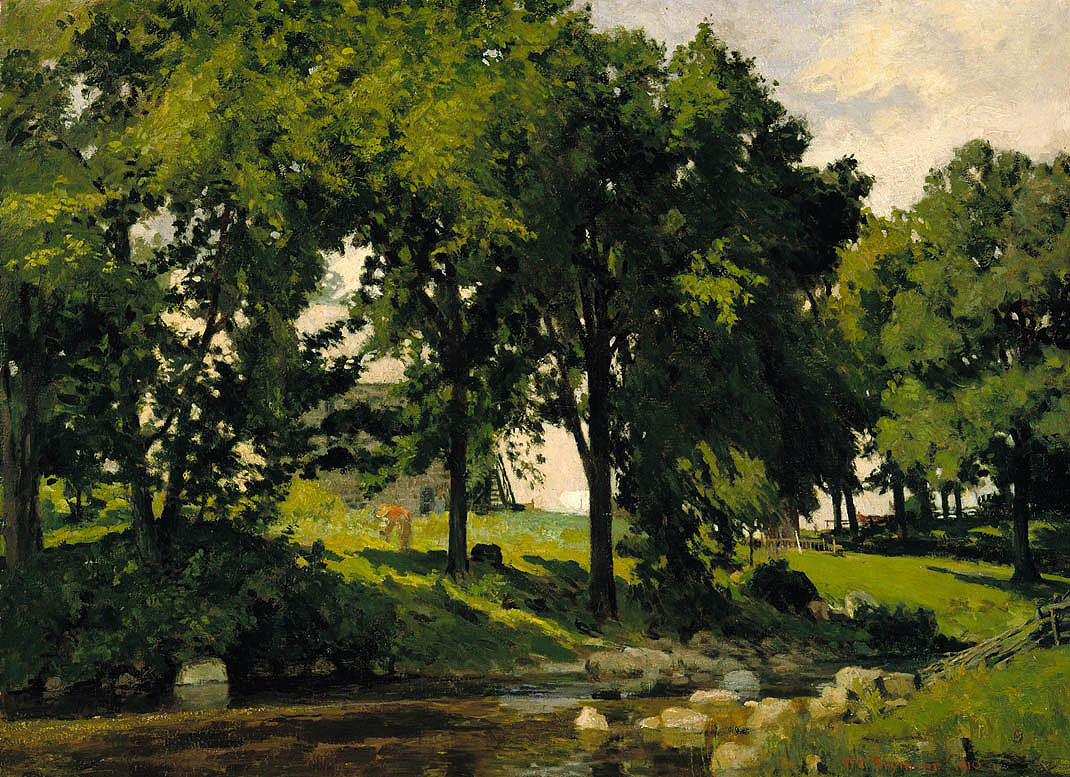
Summer-Landscape (2), 1910.

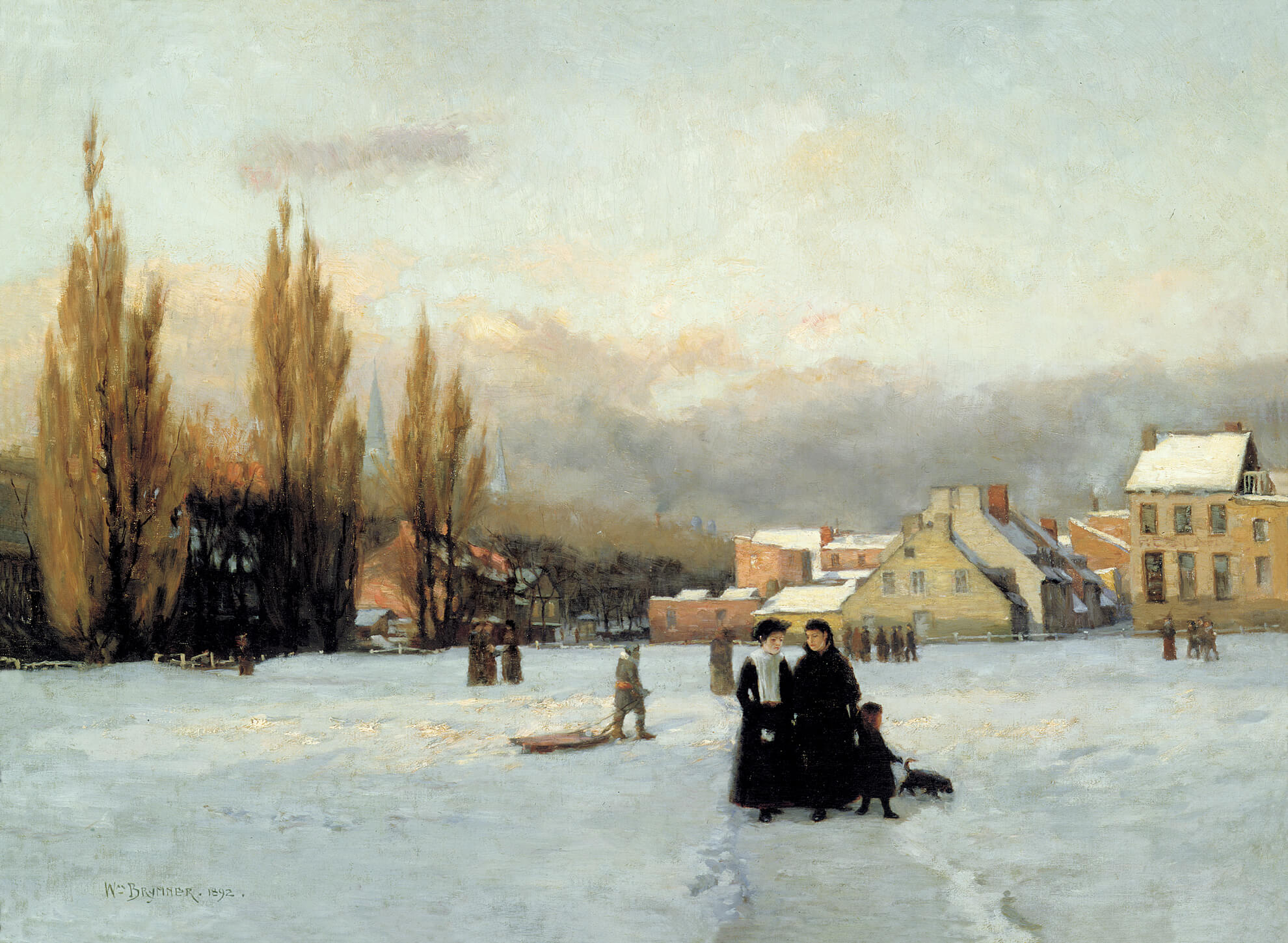
Le Champ-de-Mars en hiver, 1892.

== Footnotes ==
=== Bibliography ===
- Anderson, Jocelyn (2020). William Brymner: Life & Work. Art Canada Institute. Retrieved December 11, 2020.
- "William Brymner fonds" Queen's University Archives.
- "William Brymner". Dictionary of Canadian Biography (online ed.). University of Toronto Press. 1979–2016.
- Boutilier, Alicia; Maréchal, Paul (2010). William Brymner: Artist, Teacher, Colleague. Kingston: Agnes Etherington Art Center. ISBN 978-1-55339-251-4.
- Bruce, Tobi; Cable, Patrick Shaw (2011). The French Connection: Canadian Painters at the Paris Salons 1880-1900. Hamilton, Ontario: Art Gallery of Hamilton.
- Harper, J. Russell (1977). Painting in Canada: a history. University of Toronto Press. pp. 209–211. ISBN 0-8020-6307-1.
- Newlands, Anne (2000). Canadian Art: From Its Beginnings To 2000. Firefly Books Ltd. pp. 57. ISBN 978-1-55209-450-1.
- Prakash, A.K.(2015) Impressionism in Canada: A Journey of Rediscovery. Stuttgart: Arnoldsche Art Publishers, pp. 491–509. ISBN 978-3-89790-427-9
- Reid, Dennis (1988). A Concise History Of Canadian Painting: Second Edition. Toronto: Oxford University Press. pp. 94–95. ISBN 0-19-540663-X.

Cultural offices
Preceded by George Agnew Reid	President of the Royal Canadian Academy of Arts; 1909-1918	Succeeded by Homer Watson
