= Clarence Gagnon =

Canadian painter (1881–1942)

Clarence A. Gagnon
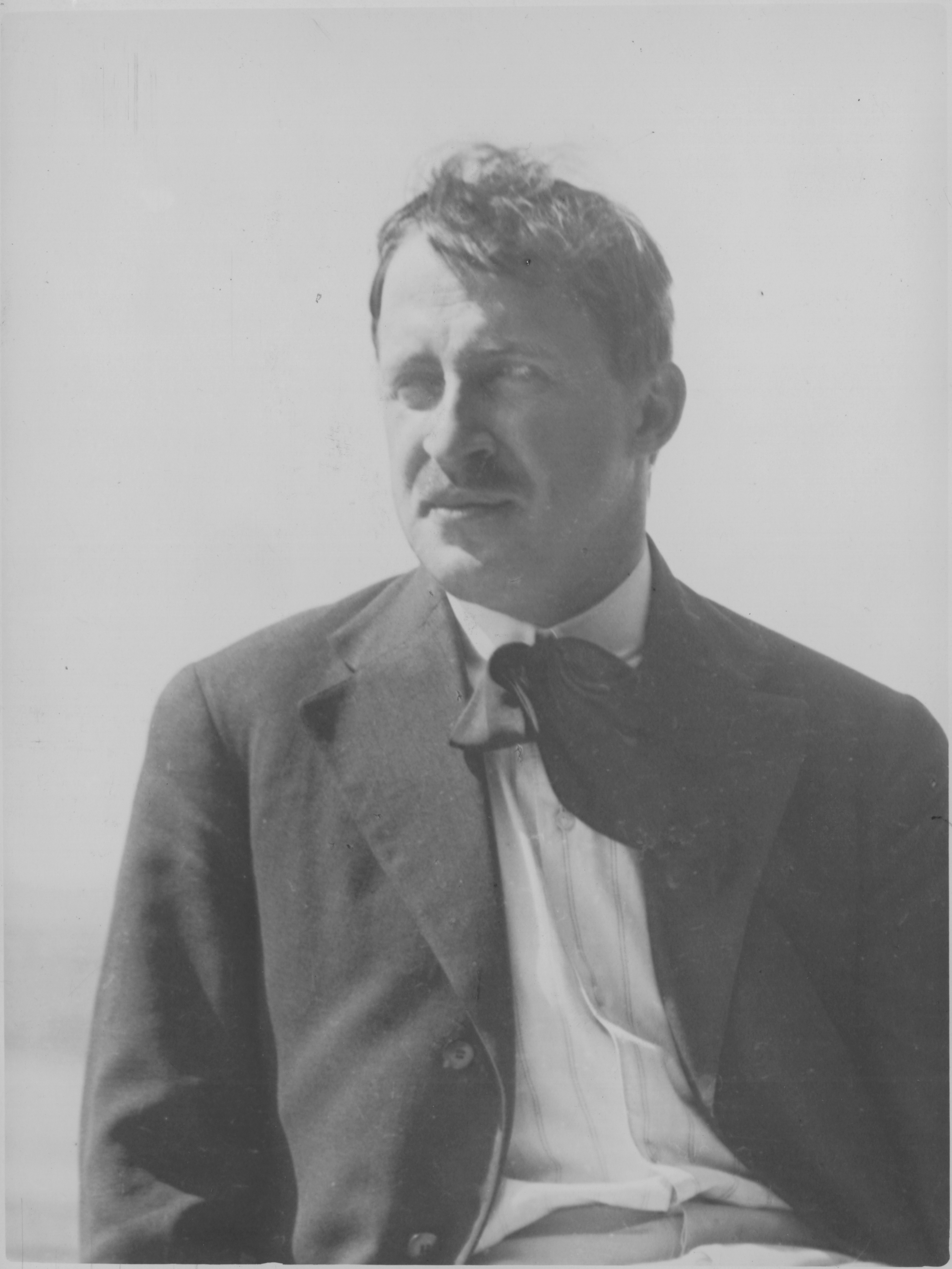
- Gagnon in 1930
- Born: Clarence Alphonse Gagnon; November 8, 1881; Montreal, Quebec, Canada
- Died: January 5, 1942 (aged 60); Montreal, Quebec, Canada
- Education: Art Association of Montreal, with William Brymner; Académie Julian, with Jean-Paul Laurens
- Known for: painter, engraver, illustrator
- Spouse: Lucile Rodier (m. 1919)
- Awards: Trevor Prize, LL. D. (honorary, University of Montreal)

Clarence Alphonse Gagnon, RCA LL. D. (November 8, 1881 – January 5, 1942) was a French Canadian painter, draughtsman, engraver and illustrator. He is known for his landscape paintings of the Laurentians and the Charlevoix region of eastern Quebec.

== Early years and training ==
Clarence Alphonse Gagnon was born in Montreal, Quebec. He was the son of Alphonse E. Gagnon, a milling manager, and a cultured English mother, who was interested in literature. Part of his childhood was spent in Sainte Rose, a village north of Montreal. Early in life, his mother had encouraged him to learn drawing and painting, but his father wanted him to become a businessman.

He studied with William Brymner at the Art Association of Montreal in 1897, the same year that Brymner delivered a lecture on Impressionism at the school. Brymner, as he did with many of his students, encouraged Gagnon to study in Paris, and with the financial support of a wealthy patron, James Morgan, Gagnon enrolled at the Académie Julian in 1904, where he studied with Jean-Paul Laurens. While there, he painted the French countryside and the beaches at Saint-Malo, Dinan, and Dinard in small oil-on-boards and canvases, lightening his colour palette and recording the effects of light. These works show the influence of Eugène Boudin and James W. Morrice whom he admired and who introduced him to working with a sketch box.

Gagnon showed his early promise by winning a bronze medal at the Canadian exhibition at the Louisiana Purchase Exposition in 1904. Before returning to Canada in the autumn of 1907, he travelled to Spain, Italy, England, and Norway making sketches for paintings and prints. During this period he also established an international reputation as an etcher but he gave up engraving for painting in the period 1907 to 1910.

== Career ==
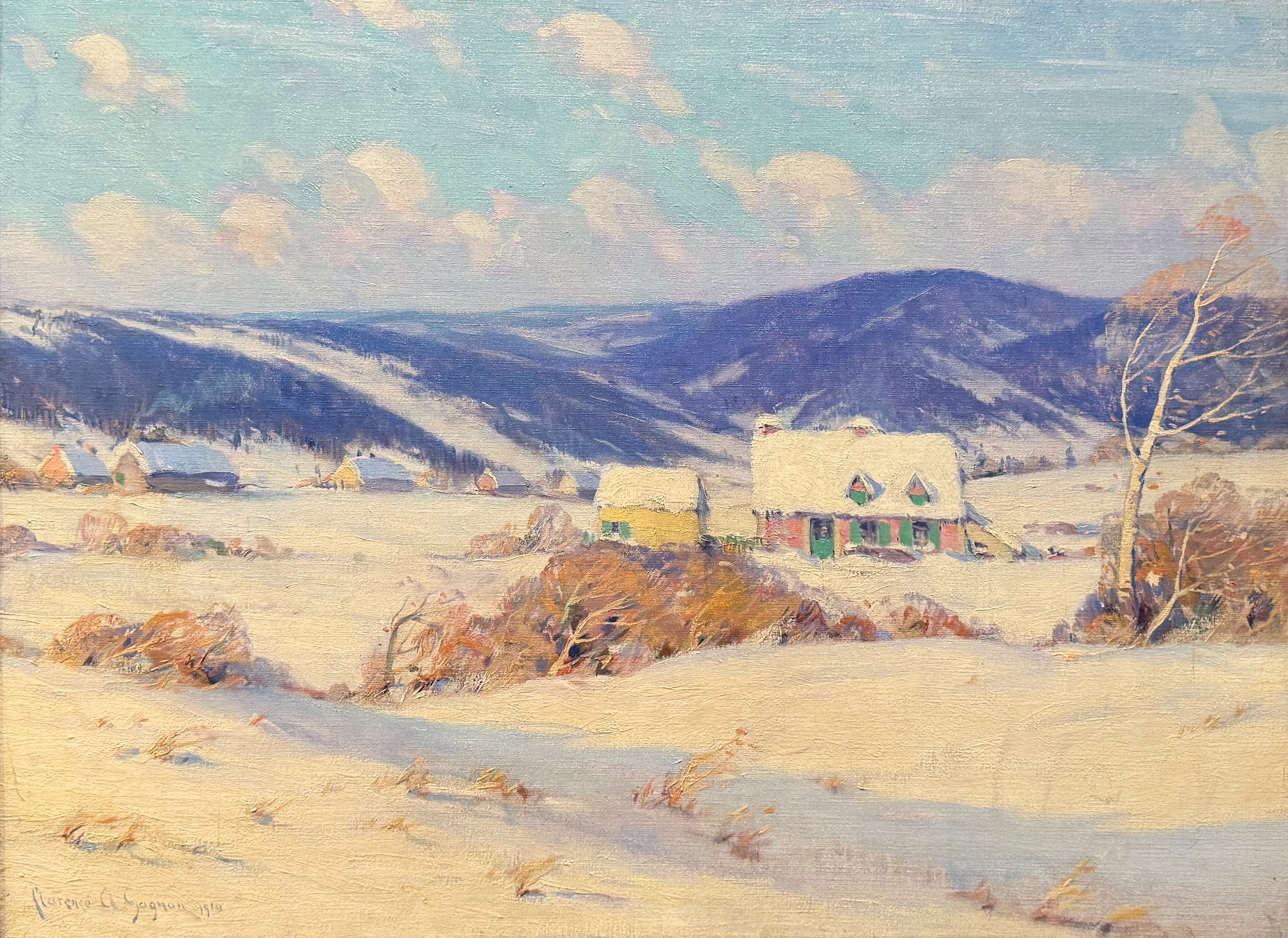
In the Laurentians, Winter, 1910

In 1907, Gagnon returned to Canada, and settled in the Baie-Saint-Paul region of Charlevoix. In 1913, his career hit a turning point, with the first and only major solo exhibition of his work, mostly winter landscapes from Quebec, at the Galerie A. M. Reitlinger in Paris, Clarence A. Gagnon. Paysage d’hiver dans les montagnes des Laurentides au Canada (1913). This exhibition, the first for a living Canadian artist in Paris, marked him as a painter with his own interpretation of the Canadian winter and also as a painter known for his views of habitant life.

Gagnon lived in France from 1917 to 1919, then returned to Canada, to Baie St. Paul, Quebec. From 1919 to 1924, Gagnon took advantage of the newly accessible area, thanks in part to the recently constructed rail line connecting Montreal and Quebec City to Baie St. Paul, and produced sketches, paintings and print works of the area. During this time, A.Y. Jackson, Albert Henry Robinson, Edwin Holgate, Mabel May and Lilias Torreance joined him at various times to join in sketching trips across the region.

In 1924, Gagnon returned to France. Later he travelled to Venice, Rouen, Saint-Malo and Scandinavia to paint landscape. In 1925 and 1926, he provided original designs for the Christmas cards of the Canadian Artists Series published by Rous and Mann Limited of Toronto. He was also an illustrator and illustrated Louis-Frédéric Rouquette's Le Grand silence blanc in 1929 and in 1933, Maria Chapdelaine by Louis Hémon.

He returned permanently to Canada in 1936, returning to his native Montreal, where he died on January 5, 1942, at the Royal Victoria Hospital. He is buried at the Notre-Dame-des-Neiges Cemetery in Montreal. A bust has been erected in his memory by the Galerie Clarence Gagnon in Quebec City.

== After his death ==
When Gagnon died in 1942, his widow Lucile Rodier-Gagnon catalogued and numbered the 670-odd pochades she found in his Paris studio and their Montreal home.

== Selected public collections ==
His paintings and etchings are held in many collections across Canada, including the National Gallery of Canada in Ottawa, the Art Gallery of Ontario in Toronto, the McMichael Canadian Art Collection in Kleinburg, Ontario, Montreal Museum of Fine Arts, the Musée National des Beaux-Arts du Québec in Quebec City, the Art Gallery of Alberta in Edmonton, the New Brunswick Museum in Saint John, Art Windsor-Essex, the Art Gallery of Guelph, the Robert McLaughlin Gallery in Oshawa, and the Vancouver Art Gallery. Gagnon's work is also owned by collections outside Canada, including in England the Victoria and Albert Museum in London, the Walker Art Gallery in Liverpool, and the Manchester Art Gallery, in Argentina at the Fundación Proa in Buenos Aires and in France the Petit Palais in Paris.

== Memberships ==
He was a member of the Canadian Art Club and in 1922, the Royal Canadian Academy of Arts.

== Honours and awards ==
In 1923, he received the Trevor Prize of the Salmagundi Club of New York.

== Personal life ==
In 1919 Gagnon married Lucile Rodier, also a pupil of William Brymner. One of his disciples was the painter René Richard.

== Record sale prices ==
At the Cowley Abbott Auction of An Important Private Collection of Canadian Art – Part III, December 6, 2023, Lot #117, Gagnon's Ice Harvest, Quebec, 1935, oil on canvas, 25 x 36 ins ( 63.5 x 91.4 cms ), Auction Estimate: $400,000.00 - $600,000.00, realized a price of $984,000.00.
