= J. Archibald Browne =

Canadian artist (1862-1948)

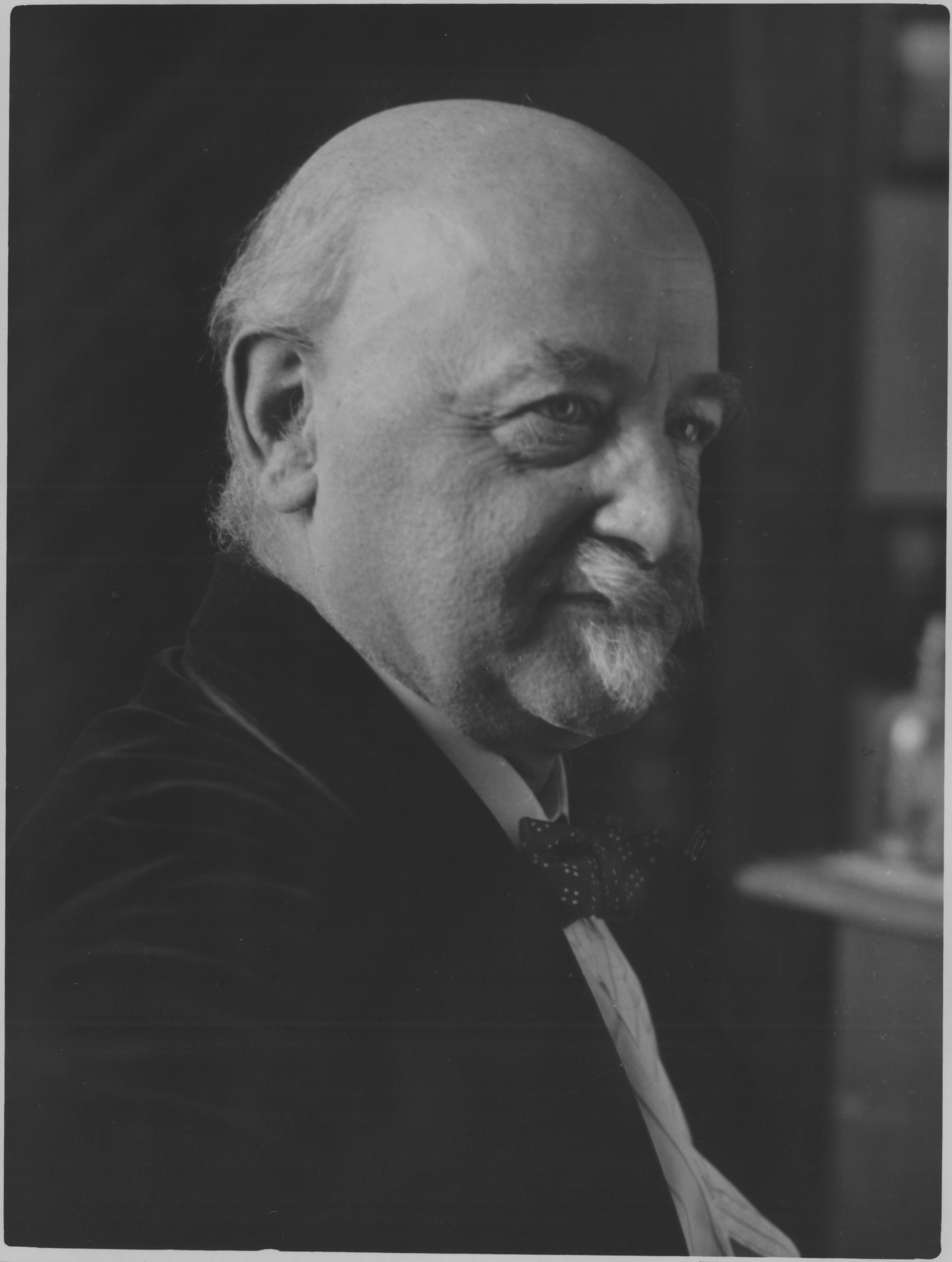
- Browne in 1930
- Born: Joseph Archibald Browne; February 28, 1862; Liverpool, England
- Died: November 7, 1948 (aged 86); Cornwall, Ontario, Canada
- Education: mainly self-taught but also studied in Scotland at the Glasgow School of Art (1882-1884], and with William Cruikshank in Toronto (1888), and again at the Glasgow School with Robert Macaulay Stevenson (1912). He also studied briefly in Paris in 1888.
- Movement: founding member Canadian Art Club (1907)
- Elected: member of the Royal Canadian Academy of Arts (1913)

J. Archibald Browne RCA (February 28, 1862 – November 7, 1948) was known for the poetic evocation of nature in his paintings. Some called him the Poet Painter of Canada. He was a founding member of the Canadian Art Club (1907) and its secretary.

== Career ==
Browne was born in Liverpool, England, of Scottish parents, and in his youth lived at Blantyre, Scotland. As a young man he worked as a bank clerk. When he came to Canada in 1888, he worked in commercial offices until he decided to become a painter. He was mainly self-taught but studied in Scotland at the Glasgow School of Art (1882–1884), with William Cruikshank in Toronto (1888), and again at the Glasgow School with Robert Macaulay Stevenson (1912). He also studied briefly in Paris in 1888. In his early work, he was influenced by the Barbizon school but later, his painting became rich in colour with traces of Impressionism.

In 1907, due to his work and that of Franklin Brownell being excluded from purchase by the Ontario Government by the Ontario Society of Artists (OSA) because both artists, younger members of the OSA, hadn't shown the work in a current OSA show, he succeeded from the OSA and helped found the Canadian Art Club. He moved to Montreal in 1923 and settled in Lancaster, Ontario, in 1927 where he painted the Laurentians.

Browne exhibited his work in the U.S., England and Scotland. as well as Canada. One of his shows was at the Marshall Field Company in Chicago. In another, in 1927, he showed with a group of Quebec artists at the T. Eaton Co. Limited store in Montreal.

He won the Jessie Dow Prize in 1923 and in 1927, he won first prize for oils at the 44th Spring Exhibition of the Art Association of Montreal for his canvas Slumbering Waters which was acquired by the Musée national des beaux-arts du Québec (MNBAQ). His painting The Mountaineer’s Home appeared in Albert H. Robson's Canadian Landscape Painters (The Ryerson Press, 1932). His last large exhibition was held in Montreal in 1946.

He was elected a full member of the Royal Canadian Academy of Arts (R.C.A.) in 1913 and to the B.C. Society of Fine Arts. His work is in public collections such as the National Gallery of Canada; the Musée national des beaux-arts du Québec; the MacKenzie Art Gallery, Regina; the Robert McLaughlin Gallery, Oshawa; and Trent University, Peterborough.

Browne died in Cornwall, Ontario, in 1948.

== Bibliography ==
- Lamb, Robert J. (1988). Canadian Art Club, 1907-1915. Edmonton Art Gallery, 1988. ISBN 9780889500495.
- Murray, Joan (1999). Canadian Art in the Twentieth Century. Toronto: Dundurn. OCLC 260193722.
