= George H. Henderson =

Canadian physicist (1892–1994)

George H. Henderson MBE FRS FRSC
- Born: George Hugh Henderson; December 8, 1892; St. Augustine, Florida
- Died: June 19, 1949 (aged 56); New Brunswick, Canada
- Education: Pictou Academy, Dalhousie University and Cambridge University, where he studied with Ernest Rutherford
- Occupation: Physicist
- Spouse: Ruth Wallace Ross (m. 1929)
- Awards: Order of the British Empire (1943)

George Hugh Henderson MBE FRS FRSC (December 8, 1892 – June 19, 1949) was a Canadian physicist in the early twentieth century, best known for his work on radioactivity.

== Biography ==
George Henderson was born on December 8, 1892 in St. Augustine, Florida where his Canadian parents had gone for his mother's health. After the death of his parents, Henderson from age three on, lived with his grandfather in Pictou, Nova Scotia. He was educated at the Pictou Academy, Dalhousie University and Cambridge University, where he studied with Ernest Rutherford.

Henderson taught at the University of Saskatoon from 1922 to 1924 before returning to Halifax to teach mathematical physics at King's College (Dalhousie University), where he worked for the rest of his life. He became a fellow of the National Research Council of Canada, the Nova Scotia Research Foundation, and the Nova Scotia Institute of Science, of which he was a past president. He was also a fellow of the Royal Society of Canada and the Royal Society of London.

During the First World War, Henderson served as an engineer officer in the Canadian Army. He remained in Canada, where he was enlisted in a garrison until 1918. Then he was released from the army to undergo war research, supported by one of the first scholarships issued by the National Research Council of Canada.

During the Second World War, Henderson contributed to mine-sweeping and acoustic torpedo research as a physicist for the Royal Canadian Navy, where he brought together a group of forty scientists in Halifax for research and establishing a liaison with the Director of Scientific Research (Admiralty) in England. In 1943, Henderson was appointed a Member of the Order of the British Empire for his outstanding contributions as the superintendent of the Naval Research Establishment at Halifax.

Henderson and his wife Ruth were avid collectors of Canadian modern art and especially loved the art of Tom Thomson and the Group of Seven. They owned a canvas by Thomson and several sketches. The canvas is titled After the Sleet Storm and his wife lent it the year of his death to the exhibition "The Development of Canadian Painting" held at the Halifax Memorial Library in Halifax, Nova Scotia, Canada. It was reproduced in the catalogue.

When Mrs. Henderson died, her descendants sold it to G. Blair Laing of Laing Galleries from which it came to the Thomson Collection, Art Gallery of Ontario, Toronto. Its popularity is attested by its exhibition history and the extensive literature that mentions and reproduces it.

There are also oil sketches by Thomson which he and his wife owned which are now in the Thomson Collection at the Art Gallery of Ontario, Toronto, such as Winter Hillside, Algonquin Park, c. 1914-c. 1915, The Poacher and others.

Besides Thomson, Henderson bought works by J. E. H. MacDonald, Lawren Harris, A. Y. Jackson, J. W. Beatty, and James Wilson Morrice on the many trips to Toronto made when he was in the Royal Canadian Navy, all from Laing as Laing recounts in "Memoirs of an Art Dealer", vol. 1.
