= Curtis Williamson =

Canadian artist (1867-1944)

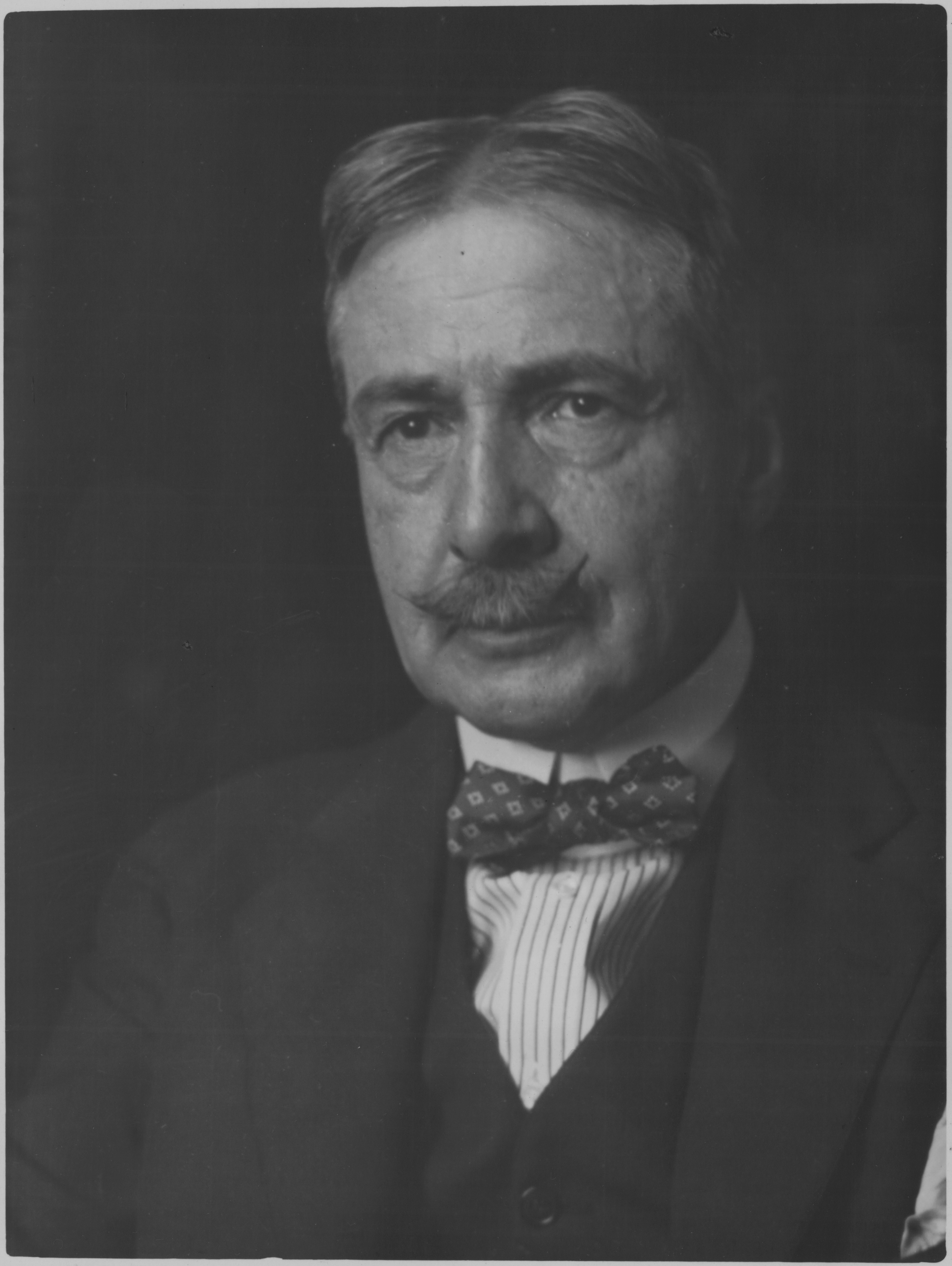
- Williamson in 1930
- Born: Curtis Albert Williamson; 2 January 1867; Brampton, Ontario
- Died: 18 April 1944 (aged 77); Toronto, Ontario
- Education: studio of J.W.L. Forster, Toronto (1885–1887); Académie Julian, Paris (1889–1892); France, Holland (c. 1894–1904)
- Elected: member in 1907, Royal Canadian Academy; founding member of the Canadian Art Club (1907) and its secretary (1908–1909) and member of its executive council (1910–1915)

Curtis Williamson RCA (January 2, 1867 – April 18, 1944) was a Canadian visual artist known for his portraits and figure painting; also genre and landscape. He was nicknamed "the Canadian Rembrandt" because of his dark, tonal style. Williamson was one of the founders of the Canadian Art Club, showed his work at its inaugural exhibition in 1907, and, like some of the other members, his work had a Hague school or Barbizon sensibility.

== Career ==
Williamson was born in Brampton, Ontario. He studied in Toronto under John Wycliffe Lowes Foster for two years. In 1889, his father paid for him to study at the Académie Julian in Paris - where he began exhibiting in the Paris Salon in 1891 - and then in Holland. When he returned to Toronto from Holland in 1892, he brought back a style that was low in tone. In 1893, he was elected to the Ontario Society of Artists and exhibited there almost extensively (1893–1922). He returned to Europe in 1895 and painted in rural Holland, then travelled to France and painted with James Wilson Morrice at Fontainebeau. He also painted at Barbizon.

In 1904, he returned to Toronto and won a silver medal for his painting Klaasje (1902) at the Canadian exhibition at the Louisiana Purchase Exposition in St. Louis, Missouri. In 1906, he travelled to Newfoundland and painted fishing villages.

In 1907, with Edmund Morris, he helped found the Canadian Art Club, and served as its secretary (1908–1909) and then, as a member of its executive council (1910–1915). He was elected to the Royal Canadian Academy of Arts in 1907 and exhibited there from 1894 to 1930. In 1908, the understated manner he used in his paintings as in Fish Sheds, Newfoundland, was seen as startling.

He was a founding member of the Arts and Letters Club of Toronto with Lawren Harris and in 1913, Harris praised his work, calling it full of "half-subdued fire" in the Yearbook of Canadian Art. In 1914, he established a studio in the Studio Building. Later, his painting style was freer and less subdued.

Among his portraits, he painted Portrait of Dr J. M. MacCallum ('A Cynic') (1917), Sir Frederick Banting (1924), his friend George Locke (1933), and G. Blair Laing (1936–1937). He died in Toronto at age 77.

== Bibliography ==
- Laing, G. Blair (1979). "Memoirs of an Art Dealer". www.gallery.ca. McClelland and Stewart, Toronto.
