= Henri Masson =

Henri Masson may refer to:

- Henri Masson (fencer)
- Henri Masson (artist)
