= Wilfrid Flood =

English-born Canadian cartographer

- Born: January 17, 1904; Dalston, England
- Died: March 28, 1946 (aged 42); Ottawa, Ontario, Canada
- Known for: Painting, watercolour, drawing, cartography
- Spouse: Henrietta Tremblay

Wilfrid John Flood (January 17, 1904 – March 28, 1946) was an English-born Canadian cartographer and artist.

He was born in Dalston, England and studied at the Bolt Court School of Art in London. Flood immigrated to Canada in May 1924, settling in Ottawa. He worked as a draughtsman and cartographer for the federal Department of Mines and Resources; he later was employed with the National Research Council. He was guided in his artistic development by Franklin Brownell, Ernest Fosbery and Frederick Varley.

Flood provided illustrations for various publications including The Romance of Canada by A.L. Burt, a high school history textbook. He also provided maps and drawings for the Canadian Geographical Journal between 1936 and 1939.

Paintings by Flood have been exhibited at the National Gallery of Canada, the Montreal Museum of Fine Arts, the Art Gallery of Ontario and the Royal Canadian Academy of Arts. One of his paintings was included in an exhibit of Canadian art at the 1939 New York World's Fair. In 2023, Wilfrid Flood (1904-1946): A Passion for Pictures, a holding of the gallery's extensive collection of works by Flood, was shown at the Ottawa Art Gallery.

He served as president of the Ottawa Art Club from 1932 to 1934, and was secretary for the Art Association of Ottawa from 1933 to 1946. Flood was a founding member and first secretary for the Ottawa branch of the Federation of Canadian Artists. With Henri Masson, he was a founding member of Les Confreres du Caveau, an Ottawa association of painters.

During WWII, Flood painted the sky and scenery in a realistic "torpedo attack teacher" designed to train officers in a simulated naval engagement.

Flood was a member of the Canadian Society of Painters in Water Colour and the Canadian Society of Graphic Art, and was elected to the Ontario Society of Painters in 1942.

Flood died of a heart attack in Ottawa at the age of 42.
