= Canadian Art Club =

Canadian art collectives, 1907–1915

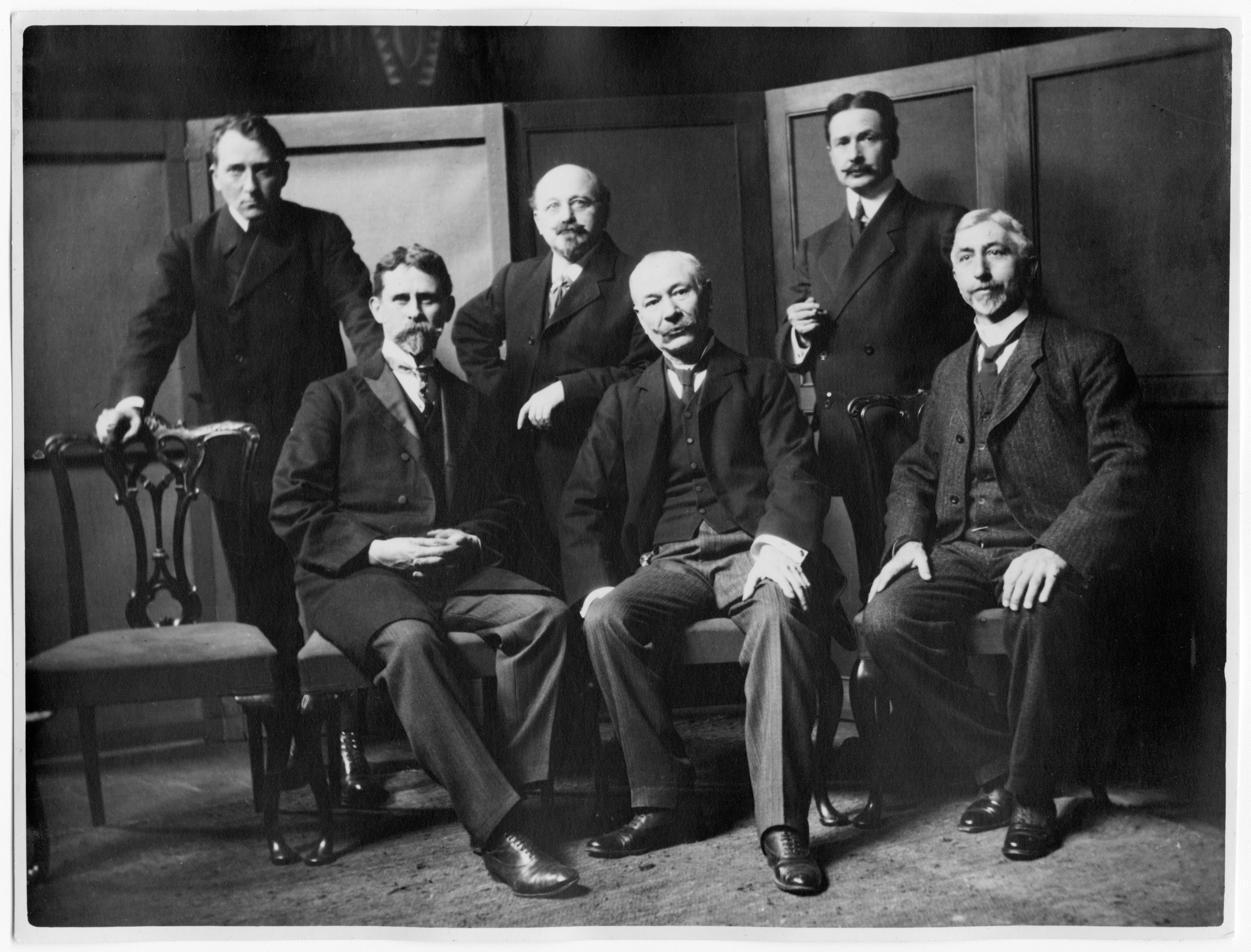
- Formation: 1907; 119 years ago
- Type: Arts association
- Legal status: Charity
- Purpose: To advance the standards of Canadian art exhibitions and to exhibit the work of distinguished Canadian artists
- Headquarters: Toronto, Ont., Canada
- Region served: Canada
- Official language: English, French

The Canadian Art Club was an artists' group established in Toronto in 1907 to advance the standards of Canadian art exhibitions and to exhibit the work of distinguished Canadian artists, particularly those who had studied abroad or lived there. It declined after the death of its co-founder Edmund Morris in 1913, ceased to exist in 1915 but was not formally dissolved till 1933.

It had a decisive role in making known the principles of Impressionism as they were understood in Canada.

== History ==
The Canadian Art Club, a private exhibiting society, originated in Toronto as a splinter group from the Ontario Society of Artists in 1907 and had a membership (by invitation only) of 20 artists. The club, modeled on Whistler's International Society of Sculptors, Painters and Gravers, encouraged achievement of individuals and was nationalist in persuading expatriates to exhibit at home, but defined nationality in only the broadest terms. Its eight exhibitions hoped to establish a high standard for other artists and concentrated on small, carefully hung groups of works by leading Canadian artists. It was supported by its lay members.

The annual exhibitions organized in Toronto, and in Montreal in 1910, included some of the finest work being produced by Canadian artists. Membership included painters and sculptors and was by invitation only. Edmund Morris and Homer Watson were key figures in its formation and the first exhibition included work by Horatio Walker, working in New York since 1885, and James Wilson Morrice of Paris (since 1890). The members in Toronto in April 1909 are shown in this photograph which is identified and discussed by M. O. Hammond. (Note: See Hammond's entry for 18 April 1909 in the M.O. Hammond Diary 1 March - 11 June 1909, M.O. Hammond Diaries Microfilm MS 7764 Archives of Ontario Series F-1075, the M. O. Hammond Fonds, Archives of Ontario.) (Back row left to right: Edmund Morris, J. Archibald Browne, Curtis Williamson. Front row left to right: Phimister Proctor, Horatio Walker, W.E. Atkinson).

Later expatriate exhibitors included Ernest Lawson, James Kerr-Lawson, and the sculptor Alexander Phimister Proctor. Montreal members included Maurice Cullen, Clarence Gagnon, William H. Clapp, Marc-Aurèle de Foy Suzor-Coté, and Henri Hébert. The only woman invited to exhibit with the club was Laura Muntz, later Laura Muntz Lyall, in 1908, who lived in Montreal at the time.(Horatio Walker had warned Morris to "keep clear of women artists, as of the devil").

The main instigators of the club were the painters Edmund Morris and Curtis Williamson, who were "deeply disturbed by the tired, old-fashioned look of Canadian art as seen in the various annual exhibitions" and attempted to establish higher standards through small shows. Membership of the club was by invitation only. Homer Watson was the first president, and other founding members included the Scottish-born William Brymner, who had been one of the first Canadian painters to study in Paris (at the Académie Julian), Morrice, Horatio Walker, Franklin Brownell, William Edwin Atkinson and J. Archibald Browne as secretary. The work of these artists was varied in style and subject, but generally it showed influence from Impressionism and James McNeill Whistler. Their eight exhibitions were well received, but the Club disbanded in 1915, having lost some of its momentum because of the death by drowning of Morris in 1913 and because of the distractions of the First World War, personality clashes among some of the members and the modest financial reward. However, the Club helped to prepare the way for the Group of Seven.

The papers of the club can be found in the Canadian Art Club Fonds CA OTAG SC009, Art Gallery of Ontario E. P. Taylor Research Library and Archives, Toronto.

== Influences ==
The members of the Club who exhibited their work were highly influenced by the Hague school, Barbizon school and British plein-air painting, by James McNeill Whistler and the Impressionists. Works by the members were well received by critics, and the club's activists played the roles of important catalysts for both artistic and institutional change. A. Y. Jackson often acknowledged his debt to Maurice Cullen in such statements as "to us he was a hero".

== Notable members ==
- Homer Watson
- Franklin Brownell
- Maurice Galbraith Cullen
- Clarence Alphonse Gagnon
- James Wilson Morrice
- Horatio Walker
- William Brymner
- Edmund Montague Morris
- Alexander Phimister Proctor
