= William Edwin Atkinson =

Canadian painter (1862-1926)

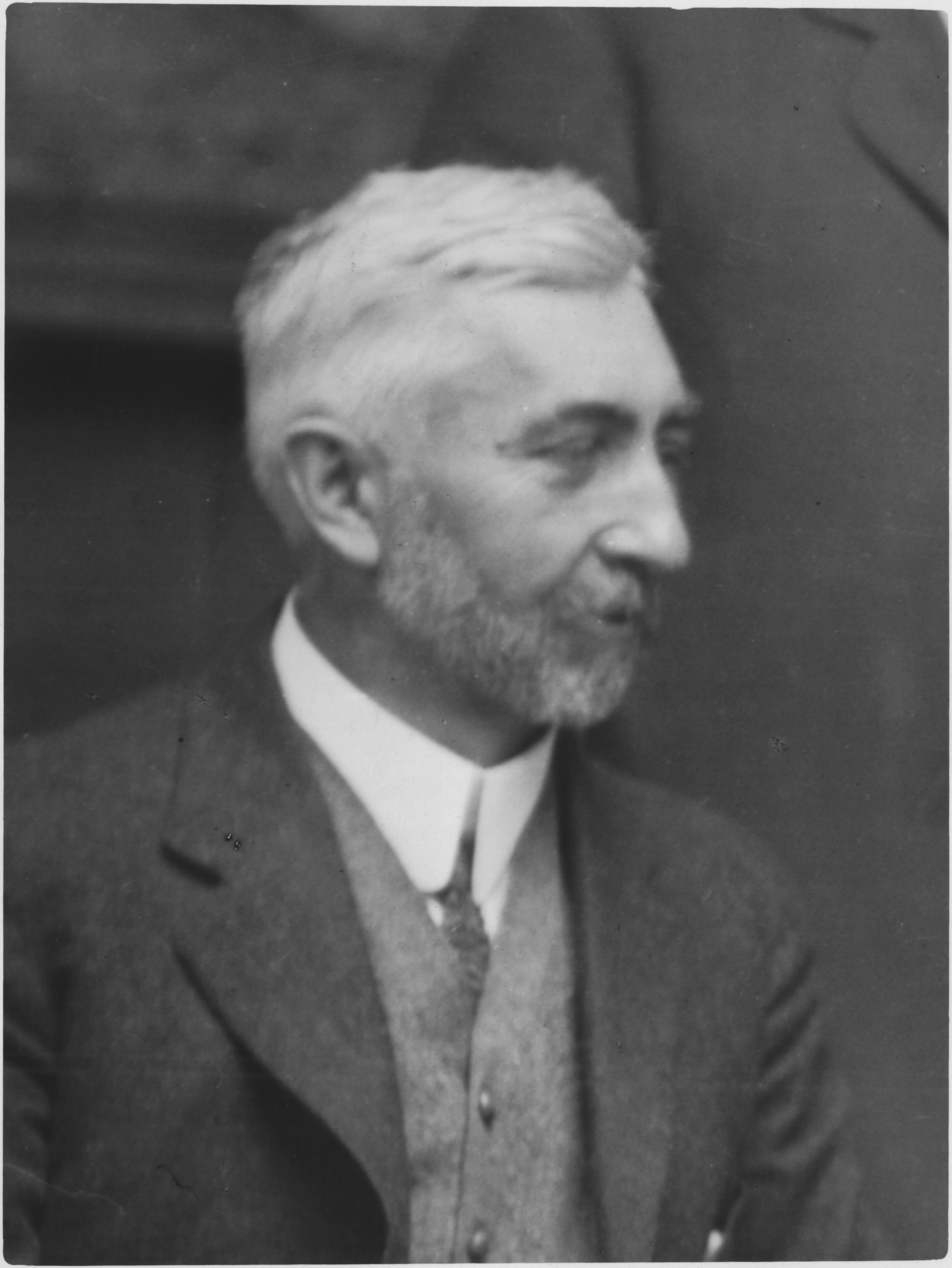
- Born: William Edwin Atkinson; 1862; England
- Died: 1926 (aged 63–64)
- Education: Central Ontario School of Art, Pennsylvania Academy of Fine Arts, Académie Julian, Paris
- Occupation: Painter

William Edwin Atkinson (1862–1926), also known as W.E. Atkinson, was a Canadian painter of landscape, a founding member of the Canadian Art Club in 1907, whose work was influenced by Impressionism combined with aesthetics drawn from the Barbizon school and the Hague School. "He delights in quiet communion with peaceful pastoral scenes", wrote E. F. B. Johnston in 1912.

== Biography ==
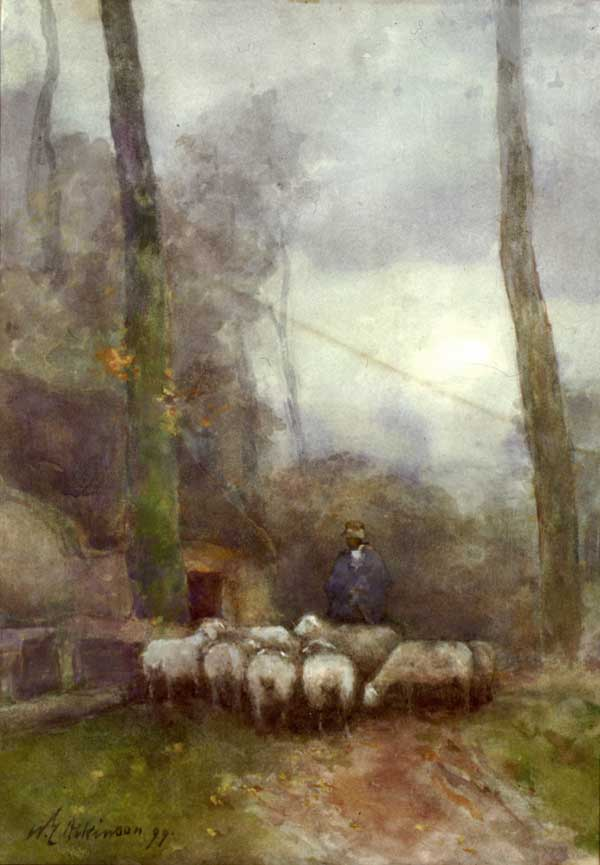
Indian Summer Evening, Normandy (1899). Watercolour on paper. Government of Ontario Art Collection.

Atkinson, born in England, moved with his family to Oshawa, Ontario as a child because his father opened an English Drug Store in the town. He attended the University of Toronto, studying chemistry, and worked as a pharmacist before he made the decision to be an artist. He trained at Ontario School of Art in 1881 where he studied with Robert Harris (painter), then in 1883–1884, attended at the Pennsylvania Academy, studying with Thomas Eakins. While in Philadelphia, he roomed with George Agnew Reid.

In 1889, he travelled to Paris, France, to study at the Académie Julian and took private lessons with several teachers, of whom the most important was Paul-Louis Delance. That summer, he painted in Pont-Aven in Brittany, an art colony which favored North American students.

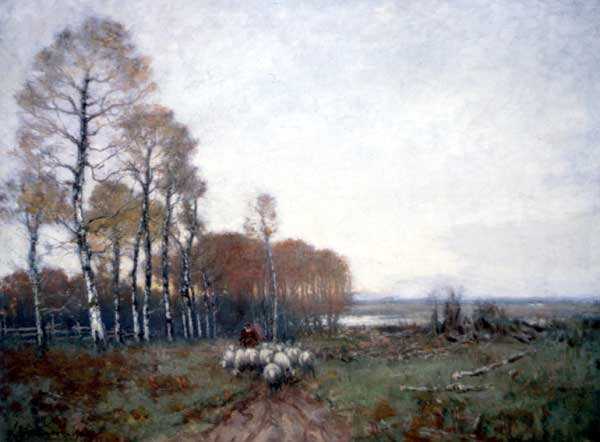
October (1904). Oil on canvas. Government of Ontario Art Collection.

From Pont-Aven, Atkinson wrote letters home, describing his experiences which were published in his hometown newspaper, The Vindicator.

Paul Gauguin was in Pont-Aven that summer and one day when Atkinson was painting an old mill, Gauguin, passing by, told him to use stronger colour, saying that (Atkinson recalled later), "If the sky is blue, paint the roof red. If the roof is blue, paint the sky green." (Atkinson's account of the meeting is recounted in the Toronto Star of 1926.)

It is clear that Atkinson followed the broad outline of Gauguin's advice and strengthened his colour. The American artist Robert Henri, in Pont-Aven in September that year, noted that Atkinson had keyed his colour up to the highest pitch.

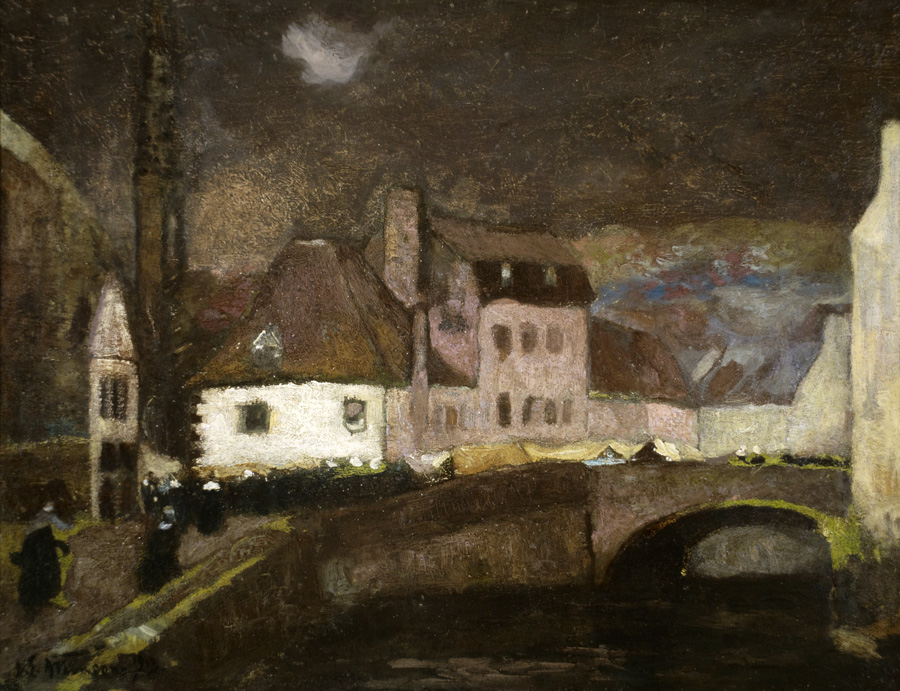
The Old Town, Brittany, Night Effect (1913). Oil on canvas. Government of Ontario Art Collection.

After Paris, Atkinson worked for some time in Devon, England and in Holland before returning to Canada. He settled in Toronto. His paintings in Canada reveal that he never forgot what he had learned abroad: the low tones and subject-matter of the Barbizon school and the Hague school as well as the loose brushwork of a modified form of Impressionism. The light in his work might be hazy, but the forms are luminous and his use of colour, though muted, is brighter than that of his predecessors. For the period, his work was considered progressive and as a result, he was made an associate member of the Royal Canadian Academy of Arts, and in 1907, invited to be one of the founders of the Canadian Art Club in Toronto. (Note: Through the Canadian Art Club, Atkinson was able to keep a close eye on the work of fellow Canadian artists abroad or at home. For instance, in 1910, he praised the work of James Wilson Morrice to Newton MacTavish who had bought a "pochade" by Morrice from a show, presumably a show at the Canadian Art Club, saying it was the best thing in the show.)

His paintings are in the collection of the National Gallery of Canada, Ottawa; Government of Ontario Art Collection, Toronto; the Robert McLaughlin Gallery, Oshawa; and the Art Gallery of Nova Scotia, Halifax. In 2009, Joan Murray for the Robert McLaughlin Gallery in his hometown today remembered his work with an exhibition, William Atkinson, Gertrude Spurr Cutts, Florence McGillivray: Art and Identity in the Region of Durham.
