= G. Blair Laing =

Canadian dealer (1911–1991)

- Born: Gilbert Blair Laing; June 20, 1911; Montreal, Quebec, Canada
- Died: June 26, 1991 (aged 80); Toronto, Ontario
- Education: B.A., Victoria College, University of Toronto (1930-1934)
- Known for: art dealer
- Awards: Centennial Medal 1967, Order of Canada posthumus 1992

G. Blair Laing CM (June 20, 1911 – June 26, 1991) was a prominent Canadian art dealer as well as an astute collector and a benefactor. Through his 40-year career, he assisted in the growth of the Canadian art market and helped Canadians better understand Canadian art.

== Career ==
After completing his degree at University of Toronto (1930–1934), Blair Laing entered his father's business (his father was Arthur R. Laing and though the gallery was run by Robert Mellors, Laing owned it), Mellors Fine Arts Limited in Toronto. The gallery was founded under that name at 759 Yonge Street in 1932, became Mellors-Laing in 1940 and Laing Galleries later. By 1991 when G. Blair Laing died, it was one of the oldest family-owned private galleries in Canada. In 1941, the business moved to 60 Bloor Street East and in 1950, when Laing headed it, to 194 Bloor West.

Among the artists shown by the Galleries were some less than well-known major figures in Canadian art such as Tom Thomson, David Milne, and Emily Carr, and among the many already known, artists such as James Wilson Morrice, Horatio Walker, and Homer Watson. Along with these artists, Blair Laing showed the work of French-Canadian artists such as Paul-Émile Borduas. In addition, from 1957 to 1966, he co-operated with Pieter Eilers of Van Wissenlingh and Co., Amsterdam to bring Canada art of the European Nineteenth and Twentieth centuries. Later, he worked with M. Knoedler and Company and other companies and individuals with a similar aim.

"Memoirs of an Art Dealer", his autobiography, was published in 1979 and a second volume in 1982, both readable and persuasive volumes illustrated with tip-in plates of works of which only a few are known even today. In these books, he writes at length about his career as an art dealer. In 1989, he gave the National Gallery of Canada 84 works by Morrice, a collection amassed over 40 years, published by Charles C. Hill as "Gift to the Nation: The G. Blair Laing Collection of Paintings by James Wilson Morrice" (University of Chicago Press, 1992). Hill's show that accompanied the collection at the National Gallery of Canada was called powerful. He also gave his portrait which was painted by Curtis Williamson (1936–1937). Among Laing's clients he counted many of the businessmen of the day such as Lord Beaverbrook. In 1990, he was awarded the Order of Canada.

== Bibliography ==
- Laing, G. Blair (1979). "Memoirs of an Art Dealer". www.gallery.ca. McClelland and Stewart, Toronto.
- Laing, G. Blair (1982). Memoirs of an Art Dealer2. Toronto: McClelland and Stewart.
