= Edmund Montague Morris =

Canadian painter (1871–1913)

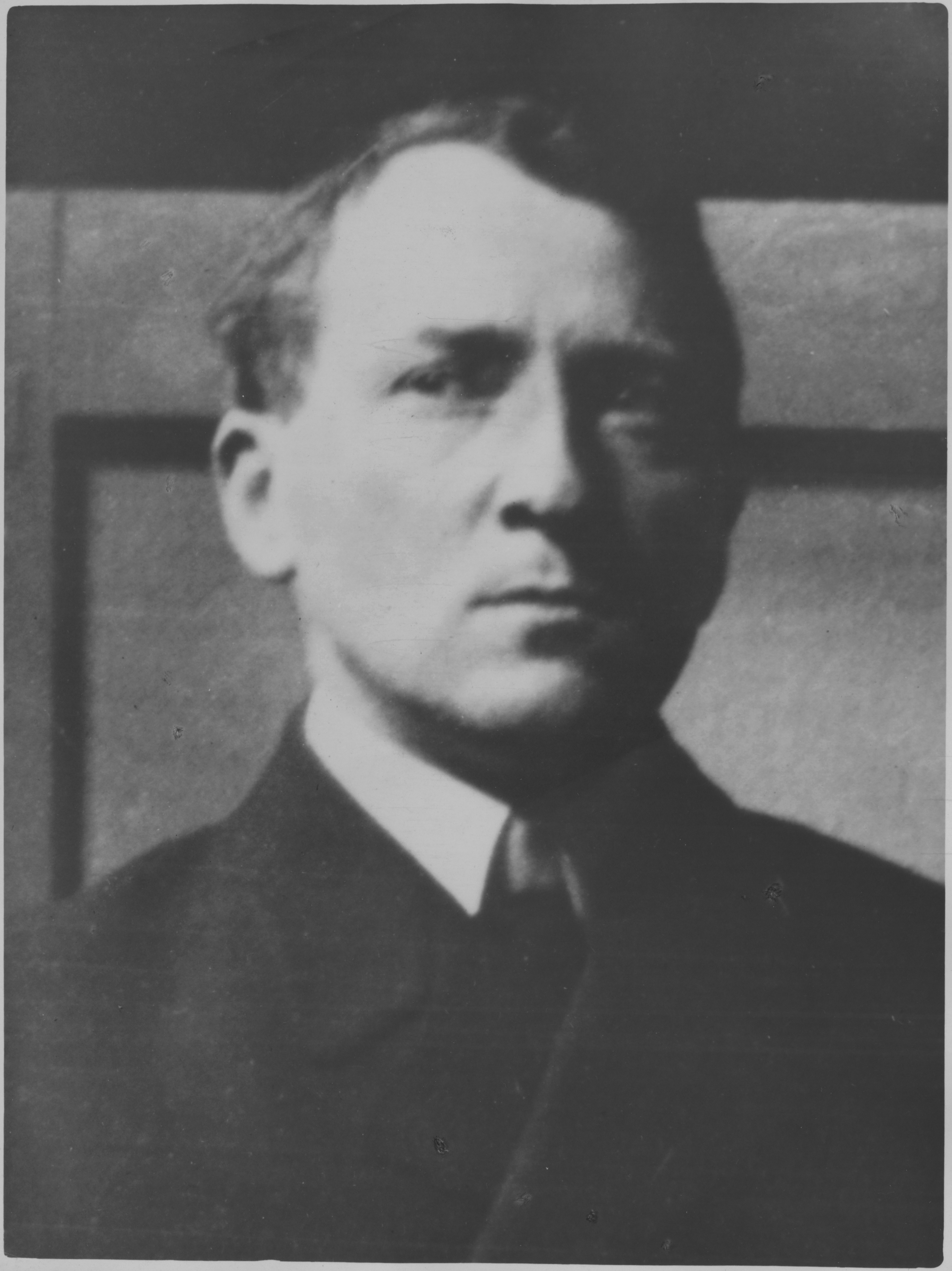
- Born: December 18, 1871; Perth, Ontario, Canada
- Died: August 21, 1913 (aged 41); Portneuf, Quebec
- Known for: Painter and Pastelist
- Movement: founding member Canadian Art Club (1907)

Edmund Montague Morris (1871–1913), was a Canadian painter and pastelist who recorded the First Nations in paint and photographs and collected their artifacts (today in the collection of the Royal Ontario Museum in Toronto along with 60 portraits by him which formerly belonged to the Ontario government collection). He was the son of Alexander Morris, Lieutenant Governor of Manitoba and the Northwest Territories. He both co-founded the Canadian Art Club and authored an early book on Canadian art, Art in Canada: the early painters (1911?).

== Biography ==
Morris was born on December 18, 1871, in Perth, Ontario. He lived at Fort Garry (Winnipeg), Manitoba, from 1872 to 1878 and then moved to Toronto where he attended Toronto Collegiate Institute. He later studied art under William Cruikshank. In the United States, he studied at the Art Students League of New York. In Europe he attended the Académie Julian and the École des Beaux-Arts in Paris (1893–1895).

Morris settled in Toronto in 1896. His contemporaries included William Brymner, Maurice Cullen and Edmond Dyonnet, among others. He won a bronze medal at the Pan-American Exposition in Buffalo, N.Y. in 1901 for his Girls in a Poppy Field (Art Gallery of Ontario, Toronto).

In 1905, Morris held a solo show in Ottawa featuring portraits of Plains chiefs that he painted from photographs. In 1906 he was invited to accompany the government expedition headed by Duncan Campbell Scott to the James Bay district to negotiate Treaty no. 9 with the Cree and Ojibwe. While there, he made many portraits in pastel of the Indian leaders at the event. He continued making annual summer trips through 1910 to Alberta, Saskatchewan, and Manitoba, making sympathetic and accurate pastel portraits of the indigenous people due to his genuine interest in them. The result was a series of portraits of unique value. In 1909, he had a major exhibition of 55 Indian paintings and artifacts in Toronto at the Canadian Art Club.

In 1907, he co-founded the Canadian Art Club. Morris was also a member of The Arts and Letters Club of Toronto, the Ontario Society of Artists, the Toronto Art Students League, and an Associate of the Royal Canadian Academy of Arts. From 1909 he also served on the council of the nascent Art Museum of Toronto (later the Art Gallery of Ontario).

In August 1913, he went on a painting trip to the Île d’Orléans. He accidentally drowned in the St. Lawrence River at Portneuf, Quebec on August 21, 1913.

In a detailed will, he bequeathed his paintings to the Ontario College of Art to be sold to fund a scholarship, and his collection of objects related to aboriginal life and history and historical Canadian furniture to the Royal Ontario Museum. He gave generously to many other institutions. His papers and over 700 photographs are in the Provincial Archives of Manitoba. His works are in the Glenbow Museum, Calgary as well as the National Gallery of Canada, Ottawa and the Art Gallery of Ontario, Toronto. His correspondence and notes concerning the Canadian Art Club are in The E.P. Taylor Library & Archives, Art Gallery of Ontario.

In 1984, Geoffrey Simmins and Michael Parke-Taylor curated Edmund Morris, "Kyaiyii", 1871–1913, a major retrospective exhibition for the MacKenzie Art Gallery Regina.

== Gallery ==
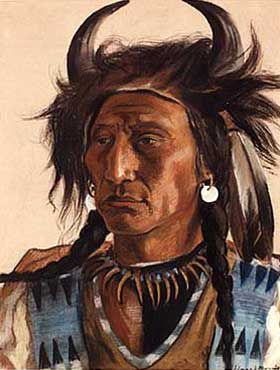
Opazatonka

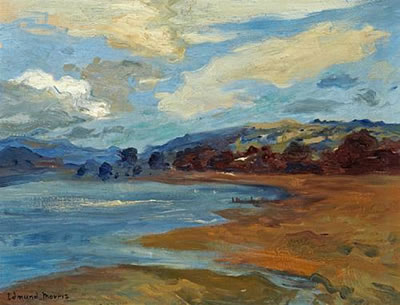
landscape

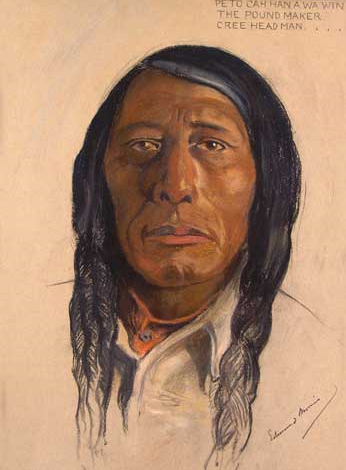
native chief Poundmaker, 1910
