= Ernest Lawson =

Canadian-American painter (1873–1939)

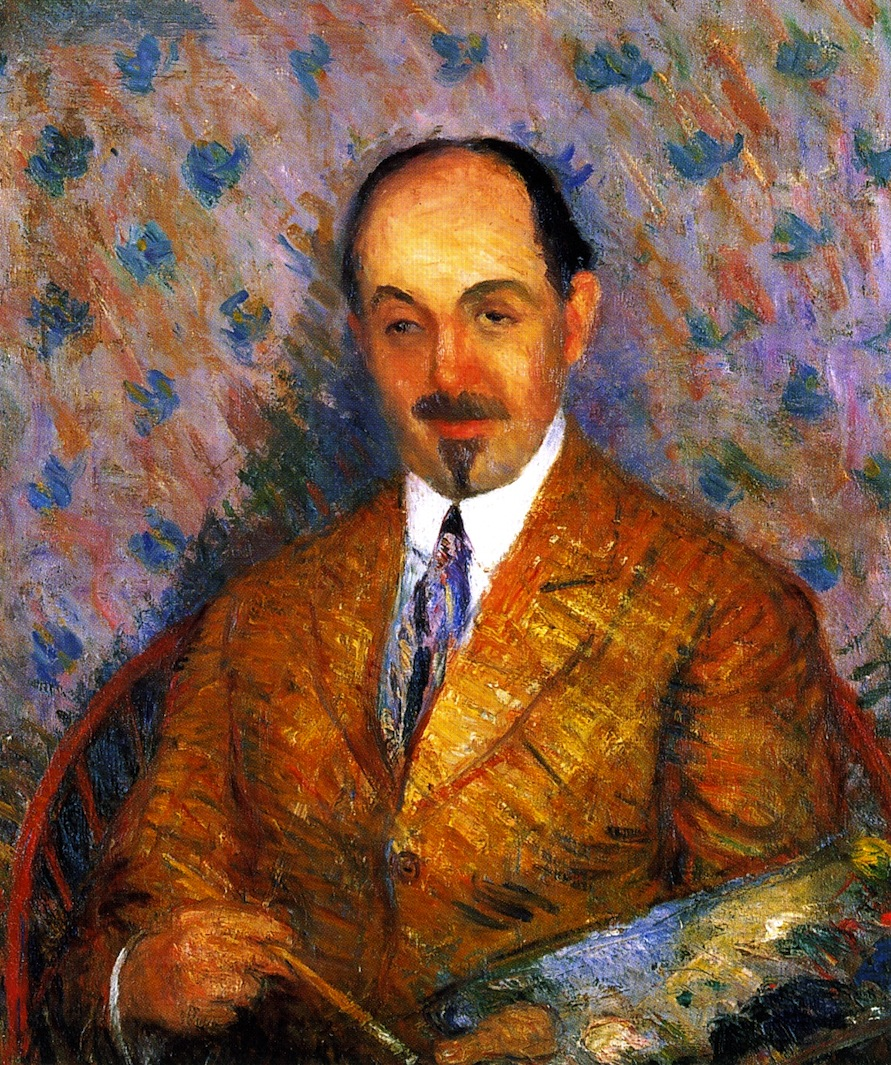
- Portrait by William Glackens, 1910
- Born: Ernest Lawson; March 22, 1873; Halifax, Nova Scotia, Canada
- Died: December 18, 1939 (aged 66); Miami, Florida, US
- Education: Kansas City Art Institute (1888); Art Students League, New York (1891), where he was taught by John Twachtman and J. Alden Weir, whose summer school he attended at Cos Cob, Connecticut; Académie Julian, Paris (1893) with Jean-Paul Laurens
- Known for: painter
- Spouse: Ella Holman
- Awards: Universal Exposition in St. Louis in 1904 (silver medal); Corcoran Art Prize, Washington, DC (1916)
- Elected: Canadian Art Club (1912); National Academy of Design (full member, (1917); National Institute of Arts and Letters

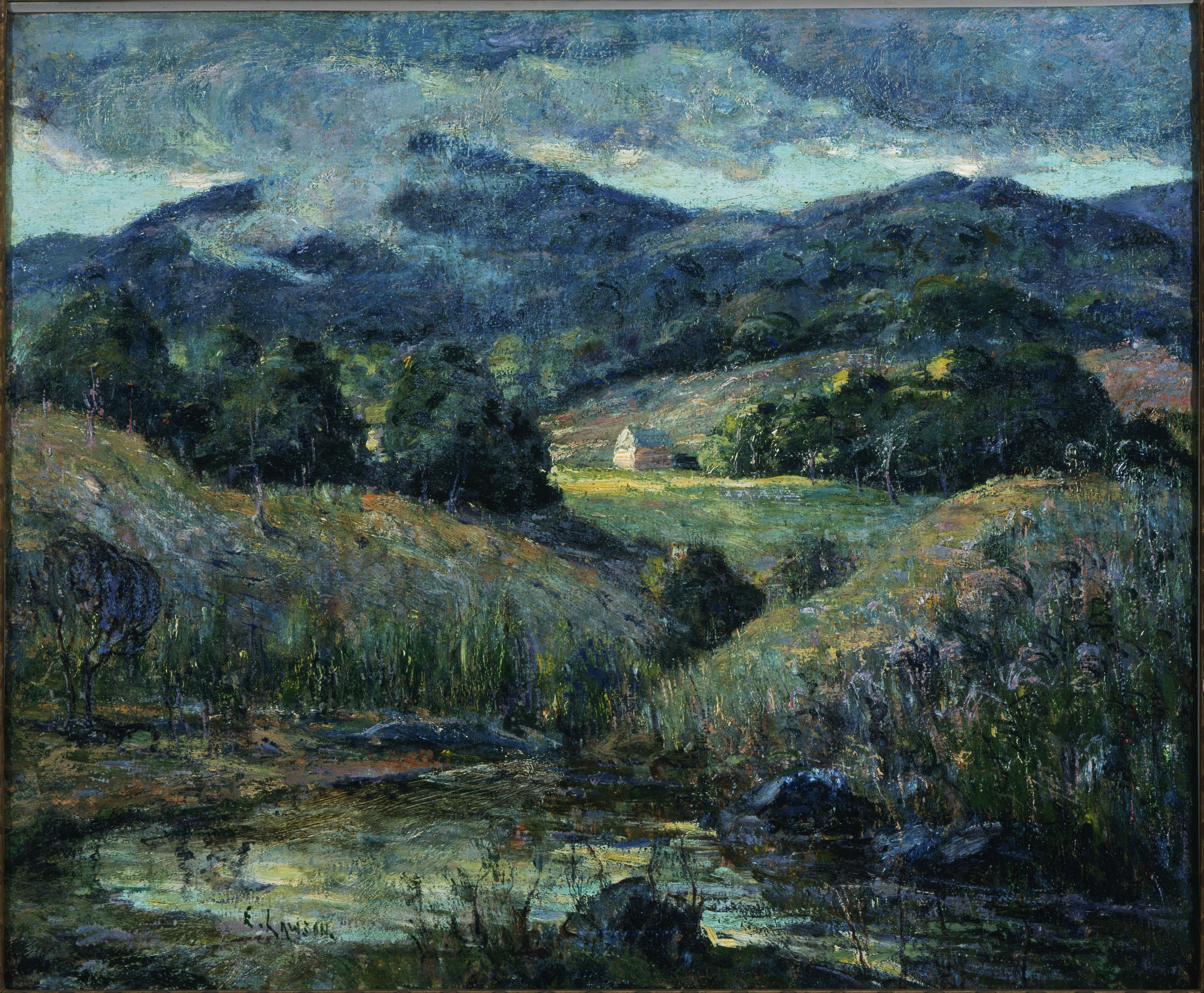
Ernest Lawson - Approaching Storm

Ernest Lawson (March 22, 1873 – December 18, 1939) was a Canadian-American painter and exhibited his work at the Canadian Art Club and as a member of the American group The Eight, artists who formed a loose association in 1908 to protest the narrowness of taste and restrictive exhibition policies of the conservative, powerful National Academy of Design. Though Lawson was primarily a landscape painter, he also painted a small number of realistic urban scenes. His painting style is heavily influenced by the art of John Henry Twachtman, J. Alden Weir, and Alfred Sisley. Though considered a Canadian-American Impressionist, Lawson falls stylistically between Impressionism and realism.

== Youth ==
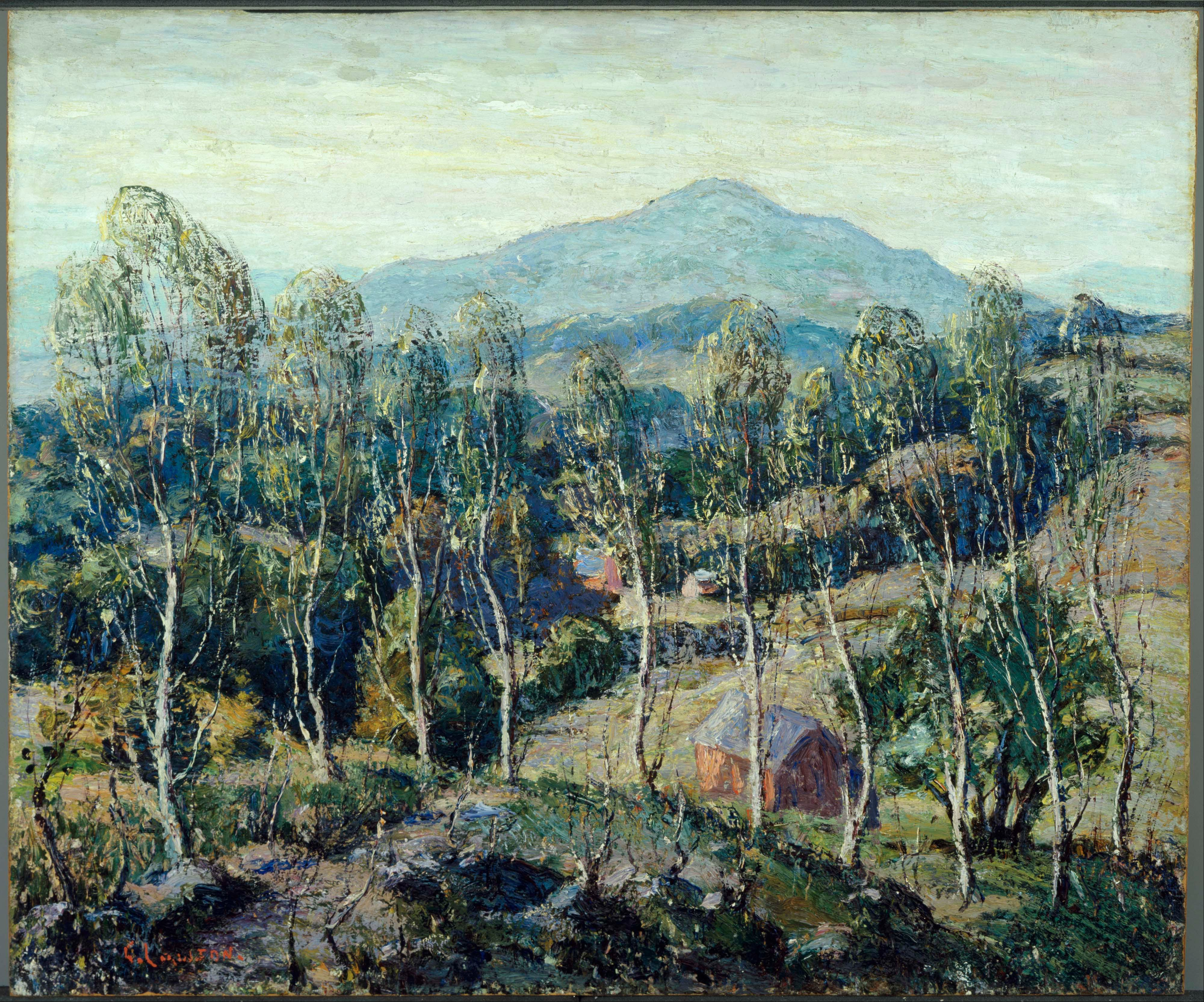
Ernest Lawson, New England Birches

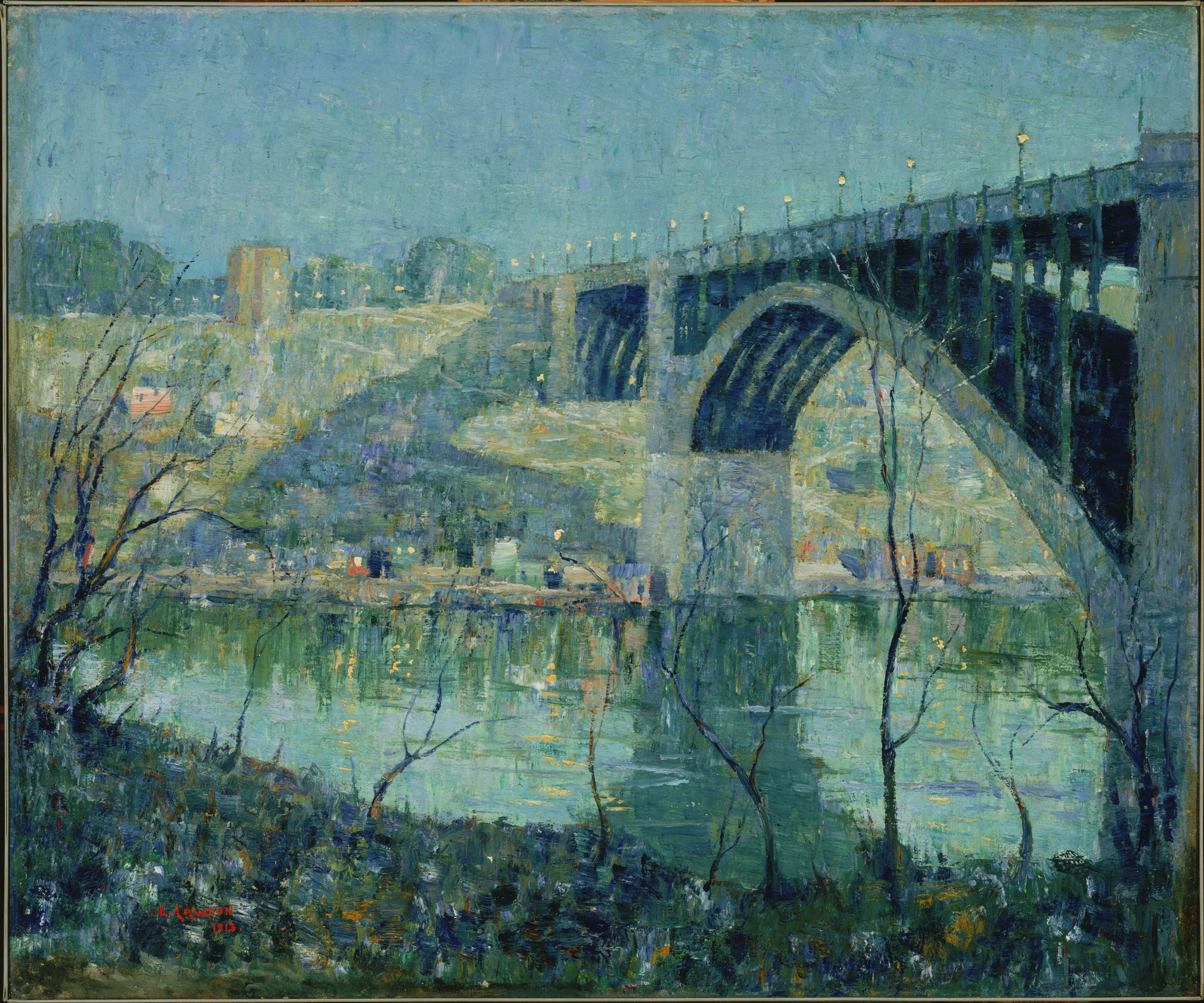
Ernest Lawson - Spring Night, Harlem River -

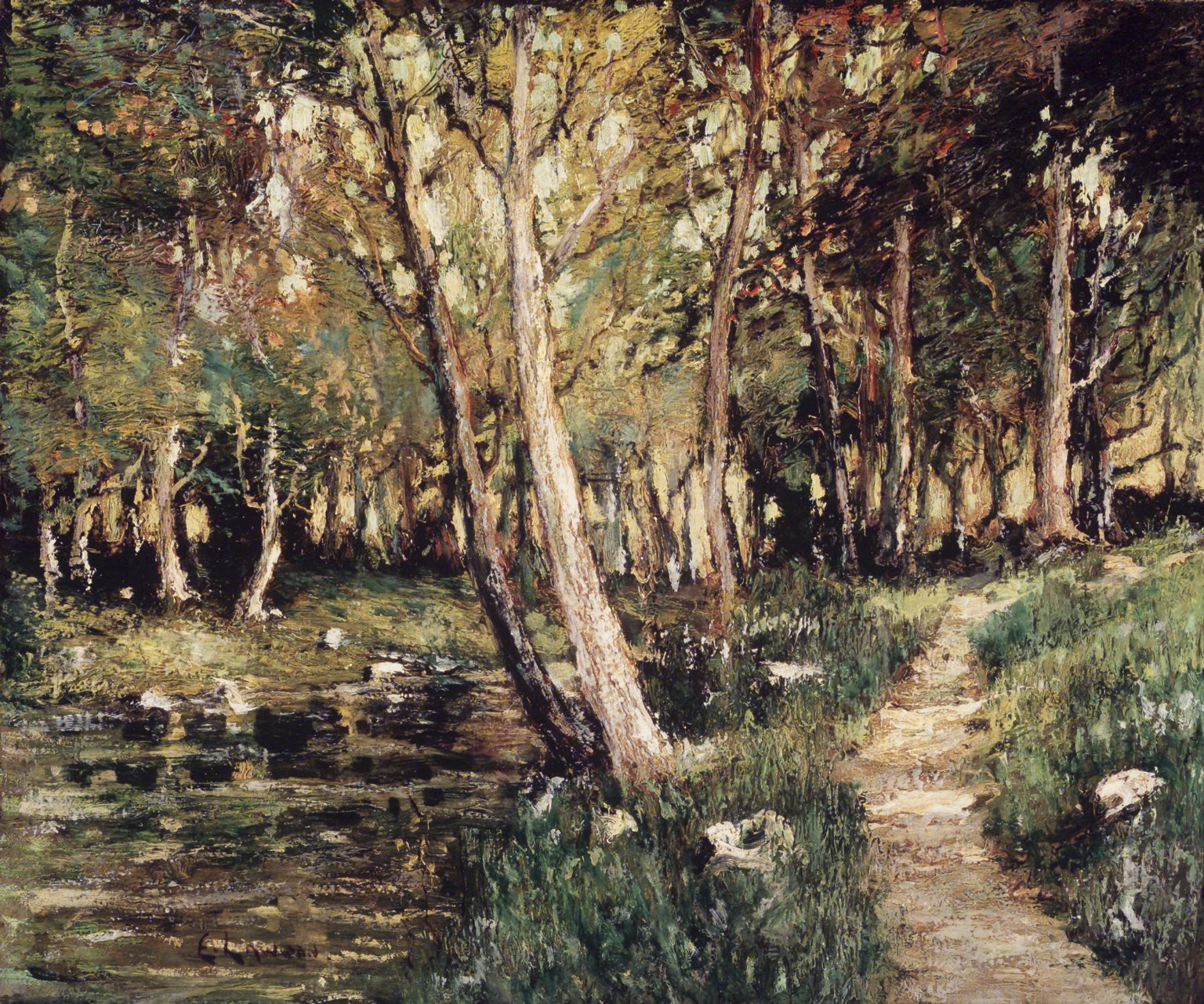
Landscape

Ernest Lawson was born in 1873 in Halifax, Nova Scotia to a prominent family, and arrived in the United States in 1888 and settled in Kansas City. In 1891, he went to live in New York and enrolled in classes at the Art Students League, studying under John Twachtman, who introduced him to Impressionism and was the central influence of his formative years. He later continued to study with Twachtman and with J. Alden Weir at their Cos Cob, Connecticut summer art school in the 1890s. "To some degree," one art historian has noted, "Lawson was a product of the art colony movement." Lawson visited France in 1893 and studied at the Académie Julian with Jean-Joseph Benjamin-Constant and Jean-Paul Laurens. He practiced plein air painting in southern France and at Moret-sur-Loing, where he met the English Impressionist Alfred Sisley. In 1894, Lawson exhibited two paintings in the Salon. Lawson shared a Paris studio that year with W. Somerset Maugham, who is believed to have used Lawson as the inspiration for the character "Frederick Lawson" in his 1915 novel Of Human Bondage Back in the United States, he married his former art teacher, Ella Holman.

== Maturity ==
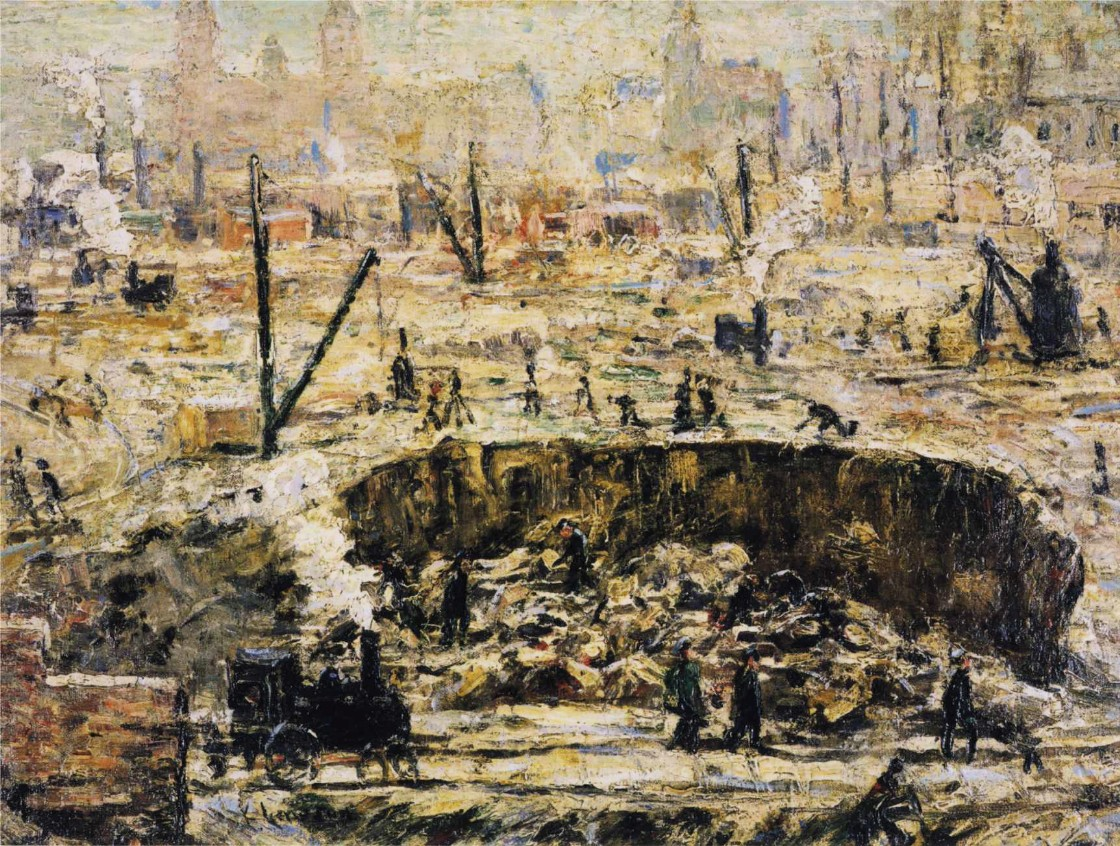
Excavation - Penn Station, oil on canvas, 1906. Weisman Art Museum, University of Minnesota—Minneapolis

Upon his return to the United States in 1896, Lawson began developing his own aesthetic. He was further encouraged by Robert Henri, William Glackens, and the other independent artists with whom he began to associate around 1903. Lawson moved to Washington Heights in Upper Manhattan in 1898, and his work for the next two decades focused on subjects—Fort Tryon Park, the Harlem River, Spuyten Duyvil, the fields, bridges, docked boats, tree-covered hills, and rocky inclines at the edge of a city on the move—from that still-unpopulated part of the metropolis. His paintings form a "procession of lonely vistas devoid of people," but are filled with an almost tactile sense of paint and an understated chromatic brilliance. (Art critic James Gibbons Huneker, a great admirer of Lawson, referred to his friend's skill as originating in a "palette of crushed jewels.") Like other realists, he worked on-site and traveled with some frequency in search of interesting new subjects; his search for the picturesque took him to Spain, New Hampshire, Nova Scotia, Kansas, Colorado, Tennessee, New Mexico, Connecticut, and Florida. Lawson had his first solo exhibition at the Pennsylvania Academy of the Fine Arts in 1907 and won a prize in the Academy's Annual for a winter landscape, the theme of which became his single most identifiable subject. The following year, he joined the rebellious group that would become known as "The Eight," whose members included Robert Henri, William Glackens, John Sloan, George Luks, Everett Shinn, Arthur B. Davies and Maurice Prendergast.

== The Eight ==
Ernest Lawson had no flair for self-promotion and little inclination to paint the rougher aspects of modern city life, which was a hallmark of five of the most significant members of the Eight. (Henri, Glackens, Sloan, Luks, and Shinn were all founding members of what became known as the Ashcan school of American art.) Unlike Henri, Sloan, and Luks, who were teachers as well, he had no worshipful student-following nor was he well-placed in art-political circles in New York, like Arthur B. Davies. He had his devoted fans—the Manhattan restaurateur James Moore (the central figure in William Glackens's famous painting, Chez Mouquin) owned a much-loved collection of Lawsons—but few thought of him as a radical. Lawson had more in common with the eighth member of the group, Maurice Prendergast, reserve and professionalism. But he did share the concerns voiced by Henri and others of the group that the exhibition system in New York, a closed system that led to wider press coverage and lucrative sales for those who worked in an approved manner, was too much a "private club" enterprise and needed shaking up. The exhibition that the Eight staged at the prestigious Macbeth Galleries in New York in 1908 did just that.

The exhibition of The Eight was the "succès de scandale" its organizers hoped for. If sales did not quite measure up to their expectations, the painters nonetheless became centers of media attention for some time. Conservative tastes were affronted, and young artists flocked to the Macbeth Galleries to see a startling range of modern representational art. The show later traveled to Chicago and Boston, where it occasioned more press coverage and public discussion of the direction American art should take. Lawson and his friends had played a role in an important cultural event and in initiating debate about a needed diversity of style and subject matter in American art.

At the same time, though, it was possible for some people to wonder to what extent Lawson was an outsider at all. Later that year, he was named an associate member of the National Academy of Design, and he was made a full academician in 1917. He exhibited as a member of the Canadian Art Club from 1911 to 1915. He benefited from regular gallery representation, won many prizes throughout his career, and was highly regarded by his peers. In fact, William Merritt Chase considered him America's greatest landscape painter, an endorsement that carried a healthy cachet with it. None of this translated into wealth or fame in the long run, however. Lawson had financial problems all his life and suffered from poor health in his later years.

Lawson was invited to contribute three paintings to the landmark Armory Show of 1913. Like many American artists at the time, he was not prepared to abandon representational art for the new paths suggested by Cubism, Fauvism, and Futurism, but he was open to learning more about Post-Impressionism (which he had first been exposed to in Europe), and in New York the opportunities to see the Post-Impressionists increased considerably after the Armory Show. "Acquaintance with Cézanne's painting convinced [Lawson] that Impressionism had lost contact with form in its insistence upon surface light, and in his later works he made an obvious attempt to recapture solidity. Although he never completely assimilated Cézanne's structural methods, Lawson managed to introduce a measure of form into his art and some resemblance to the Aix master...as he dropped the coloristic haze and the pastel prettiness inherited from Twachtman."

== Later years ==
Though his work was sought after by important collectors in the 1910s and 1920s, such as John Quinn, Duncan Phillips, Albert C. Barnes, and Ferdinand Howald, who single-handedly built the modern collection of the Columbus Museum of Art, Lawson did not maintain a high profile in the American art world as Precisionism, the artists of the Alfred Stieglitz circle (e.g., Georgia O'Keeffe, John Marin, Charles Demuth), and other adventurous movements and individuals took center stage.

Eventually, he left New York. Lawson visited Florida when he befriended Katherine and Royce Powell, his close friends and patrons who lived there. He first stayed with them in Coral Gables in 1931, and he returned there often, moving permanently to Florida in 1936. In his last years, he completed a post office mural in Short Hills, New Jersey (no longer extant), but he focused primarily on painting the Florida landscape. Depressed and in declining health, he drowned under mysterious circumstances in 1939, apparently while swimming on Miami Beach. Friends wondered if Lawson's death had been a suicide.

Today, Lawson's work can be found in the collections of many North American art museums. Robert Henri insisted that, among landscape artists, he was "the biggest we have had since Winslow Homer." Duncan Phillips referred to him as a "great romanticist." Aside from being well-made landscapes, Lawson's works have a secondary life today as a record of the twilight of pastoral Manhattan. The Cathedral of Saint John the Divine, in Lawson's 1903 painting of that title, is being erected in the midst of a woodland not far from the campus of Columbia University and the roar of the El. His Washington Heights of springtime foliage and glens and rowboats is today a thriving Dominican neighborhood, robustly urban, packed with people and buildings, subject of the Broadway musical In the Heights. Lawson's paintings depict a world that vanished entirely in the space of a few decades.

== Sources ==
- Berry-Hill, Henry and Sidney.Ernest Lawson: American Impressionist 1873-1939. Leigh-on-Sea, 1968.
- Brown, Milton. American Painting from the Armory Show to the Depression. Princeton: Princeton University Press, 1955.
- Karpiscak, Adeline Lee. Ernest Lawson, 1873-1939, A retrospective Exhibition. Tucson: University of Arizona Museum of Art, 1979.
- Leeds, Valerie Ann. From Prose to Poetry: The Landscapes of Ernest Lawson, Fine Art Connoisseur, 3 (September/October 2006).
- Leeds, Valerie Ann. Ernest Lawson. New York: Gerald Peters Gallery, 2000.
- Perlman, Bennard B. Painters of the Ashcan School: The Immortal Eight. New York: Dover, 1979.
- Wierich, Jochen, "Ernest Lawson: Nostalgia for Landscape" in Elizabeth Kennedy, The Eight and American Modernisms. Chicago: University of Chicago Press, 2009.
