= Sainte-Pétronille =

- Village municipality
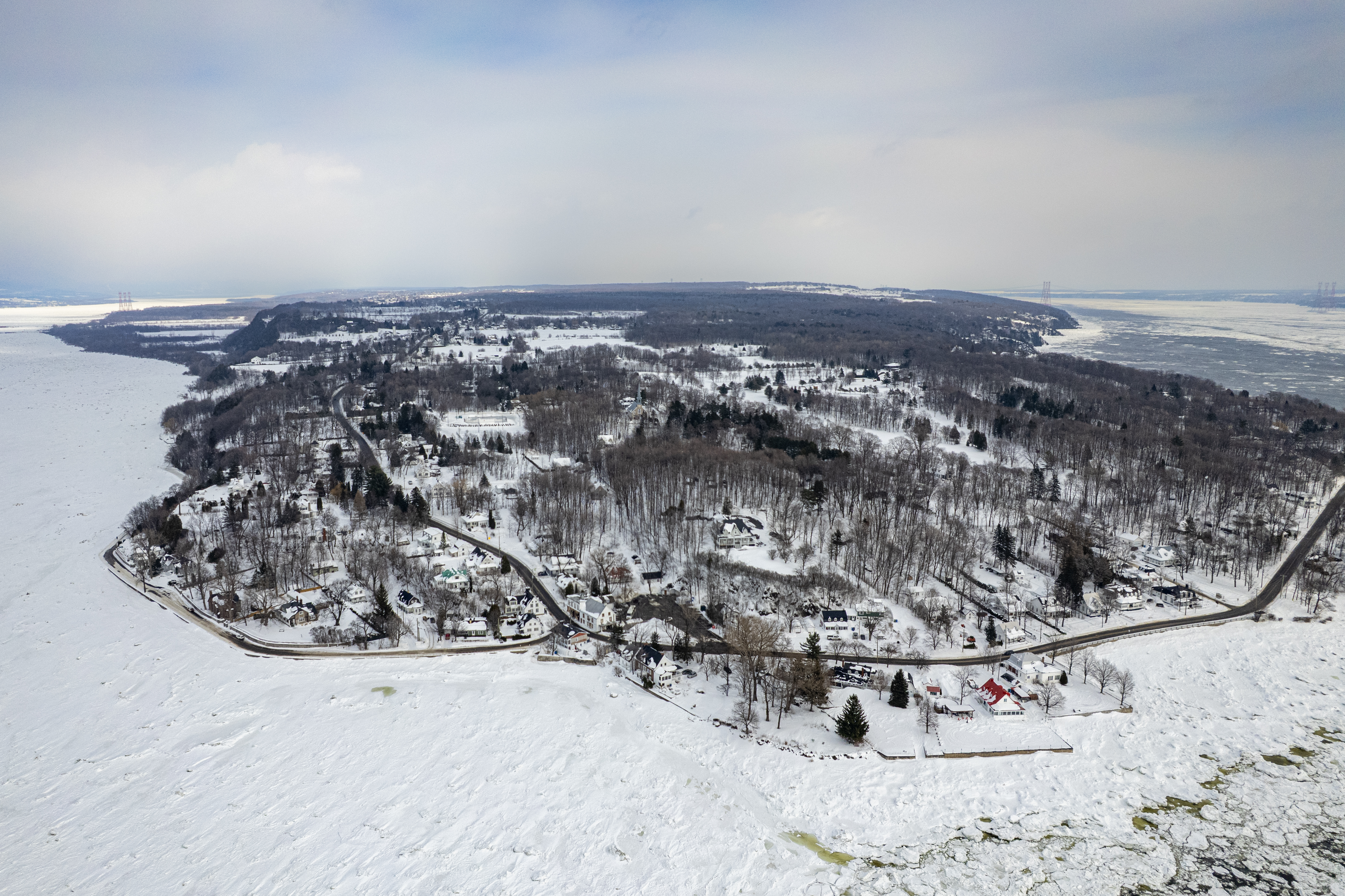

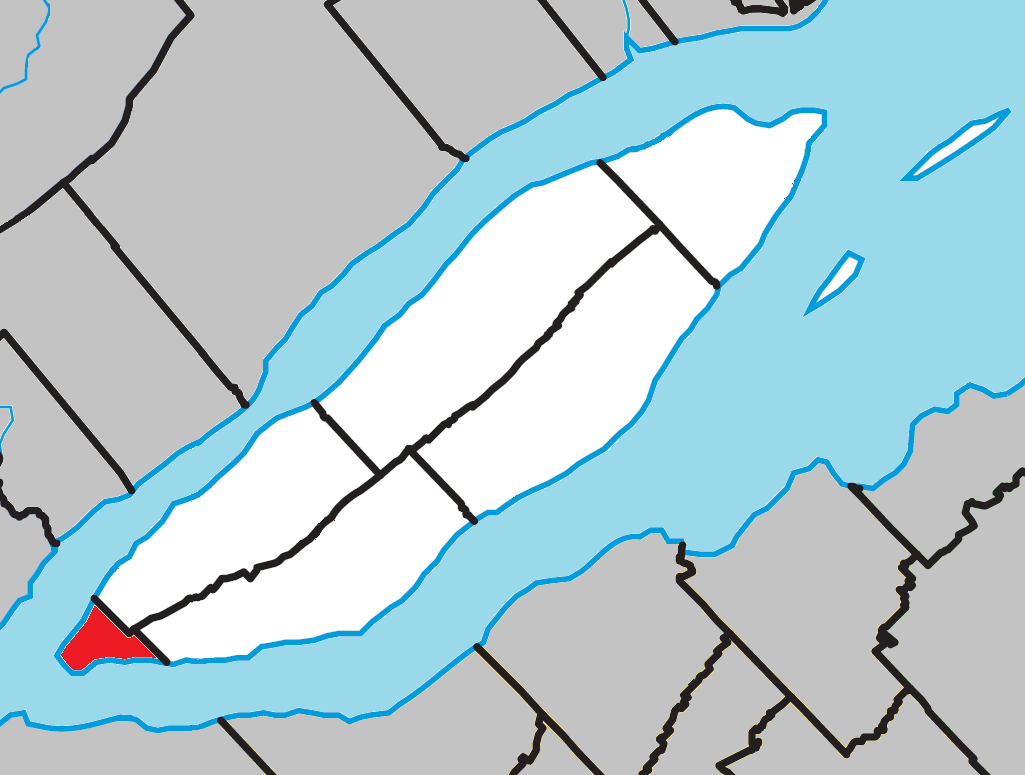
- Location within L'Île-d'Orléans RCM

- Location in central Quebec
- Coordinates: 46°51′N 71°08′W
- Country: Canada
- Province: Quebec
- Region: Capitale-Nationale
- RCM: L'Île-d'Orléans
- Constituted: January 1, 1874
- Named for: Saint Petronilla

Government
  - Mayor: Harold Noël
  - Federal riding: Montmorency—Charlevoix
  - Prov. riding: Charlevoix–Côte-de-Beaupré

Area
  - Total: 4.30 km^{2} (1.66 sq mi)
  - Land: 4.38 km^{2} (1.69 sq mi)
- There is an apparent contradiction between two authoritative sources

Population (2021)
  - Total: 1,055
  - Density: 235.9/km^{2} (611/sq mi)
- Time zone: UTC−5 (EST)
  - Summer (DST): UTC−4 (EDT)
- Postal code(s): G0A 4C0
- Area codes: 418 and 581
- Highways: R-368
- Website: www.ste-petronille.iledorleans.com

Sainte-Pétronille (French pronunciation: [sɛ̃t petʁɔnij]) is a village municipality in the L'Île-d'Orléans Regional County Municipality in the Capitale-Nationale region of Quebec, Canada. It is situated on the south-western tip of Orléans Island, facing Quebec City.

Former notable residents include the Boswell family, who owned the Boswell Brewery in Quebec City from 1843 to 1952, and painter Horatio Walker, whose workshop remains.

== History ==
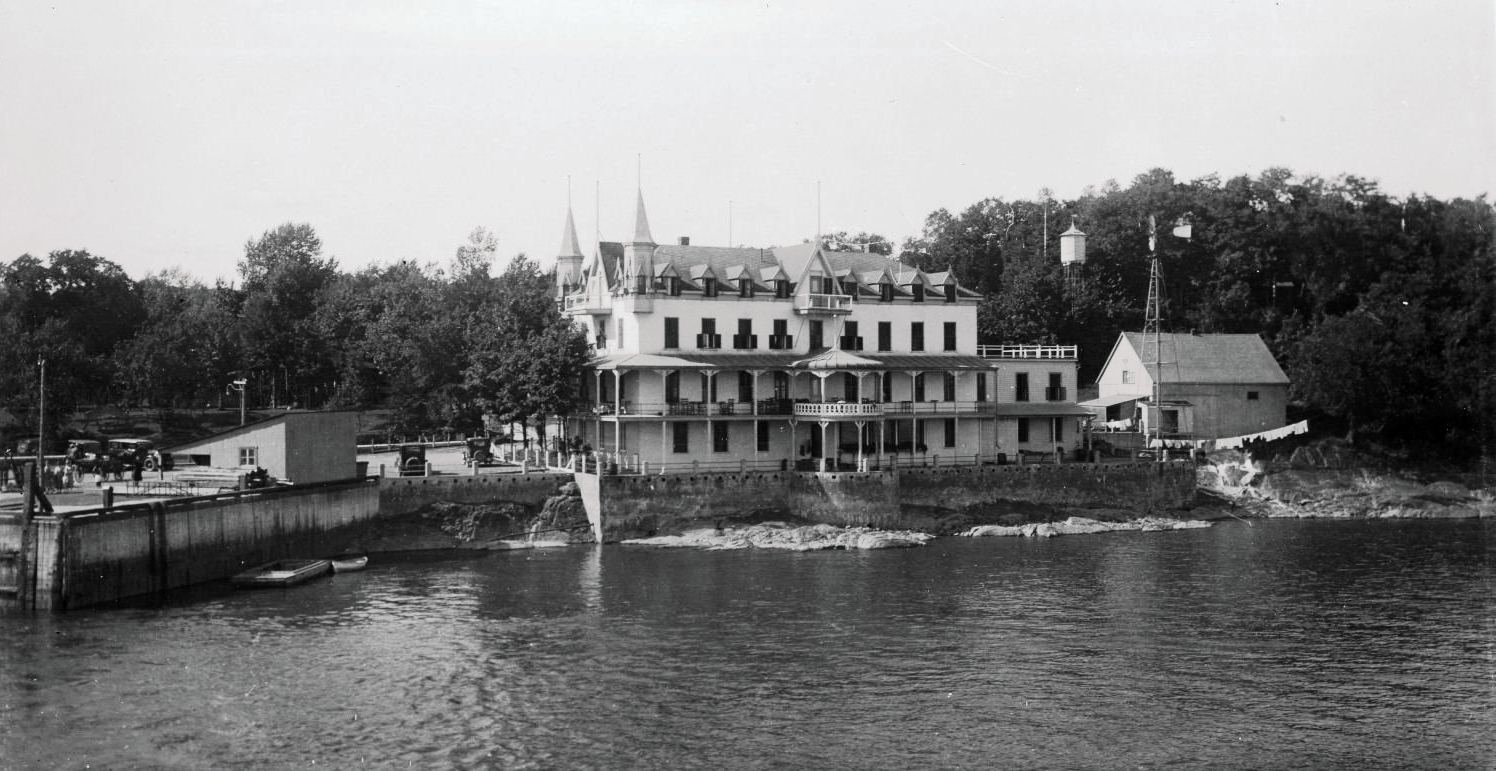
Chateau Bel-Air, Sainte-Petronille, circa 1920

In 1651, Jesuit missionaries came to the island and established a mission for Huron Indians who were displaced by attacking Iroquois. In 1759, General James Wolfe installed his headquarters there to monitor Quebec City and the two river channels of the Saint Lawrence River. After his victory at the Battle of the Plains of Abraham, the area became inhabited by well-to-do English colonists who were attracted by its romantic landscapes and its renowned microclimate. Consequently the cottage-style houses and garden landscaping gave the place a decidedly English character.

Since the topography was not well-suited for agriculture, the place became a fashionable summer resort by the mid 19th century. Hundreds of daytrippers would travel to Sainte-Pétronille by ferry for a Sunday stroll. In 1868, it became home to North America's first golf course, a three-hole course.

The religious parish of Sainte-Pétronille de Beaulieu was formed in 1870, named after Saint Petronilla (a Roman martyr of the first century), and honouring Jacques Gourdeau, sieur de Beaulieu et de la Grossardière, feudal lord of the area in the mid-17th century. The post office opened a year later under the name Beaulieu. In 1874, the Village Municipality of Beaulieu was established by separating from Saint-Pierre, becoming the youngest of the 6 municipalities on Orleans Island.

Since the village itself was almost exclusively called Sainte-Pétronille in common use, the municipality was renamed to its current name in 1980. The post office followed suit in 1991.

== Demographics ==
Historical Census Data - Sainte-Pétronille, Quebec
Year	Pop.	±%
1976	801	—
1981	982	+22.6%
1986	1,068	+8.8%
1991	1,128	+5.6%
1996	1,090	−3.4%
2001	1,038	−4.8%
2006	1,060	+2.1%
2011	1,041	−1.8%
2016	1,033	−0.8%
2021	1,055	+2.1%
Source: Statistics Canada

In the 2021 Census of Population conducted by Statistics Canada, Sainte-Pétronille had a population of 1,055 living in 463 of its 509 total private dwellings, a change of 2.1% from its 2016 population of 1,033. With a land area of 4.32 km^{2} (1.67 sq mi), it had a population density of 244.2/km^{2} (632.5/sq mi) in 2021.

Canada census – Sainte-Pétronille community profile

	2021	2016	2011
Population	1,055 (+2.1% from 2016)	1,033 (-0.8% from 2011)	1,041 (-1.8% from 2006)
Land area	4.32 km^{2} (1.67 sq mi)	4.38 km^{2} (1.69 sq mi)	4.58 km^{2} (1.77 sq mi)
Population density	244.4/km^{2} (633/sq mi)	235.9/km^{2} (611/sq mi)	227.2/km^{2} (588/sq mi)
Median age	54.4 (M: 55.6, F: 51.6)	52.4 (M: 52.8, F: 51.8)	49.8 (M: 49.9, F: 49.8)
Private dwellings	465 (total)	495 (total)	495 (total)
Median household income		$93,696	$86,994

References: 2021 2016 2011

Canada Census Mother Tongue - Sainte-Pétronille, Quebec
Census	Total	French			English			French & English			Other		
Year	Responses	Count	Trend	Pop %	Count	Trend	Pop %	Count	Trend	Pop %	Count	Trend	Pop %
2011	1,040	1,020	▲1.5%	98.08%	10	▼66.7%	0.96%	0	0.0%	0.00%	10	▼60.0%	0.96%
2006	1,060	1,005	▼2.4%	94.81%	30	▲ n/a%	2.83%	0	0.0%	0.00%	25	▲150.0%	2.36%
2001	1,040	1,030	▼2.4%	99.04%	0	▼100.0%	0.00%	0	0.0%	0.00%	10	▼50.0%	0.96%
1996	1,090	1,055	n/a	96.79%	15	n/a	1.38%	0	n/a	0.00%	20	n/a	1.83%

== Local government ==
List of former mayors:

- Jacques Grisé (2001–2009)
- Harold Noël (2009–present)

== See also ==
- Chenal de l'Île d'Orléans
- Île d'Orléans
- List of village municipalities in Quebec
