= Henri Masson (artist) =

Canadian artist (1907-1996)

- Born: Henri Léopold Masson; January 10, 1907; Spy, Belgium
- Died: February 9, 1996 (aged 89); Ottawa, Ontario, Canada
- Occupations: Painter, educator
- Title: Hon. Doctor of Laws, Assumption College, Windsor (1955)
- Spouse: Germaine Saint Dennis (m. 1929)

Henri Léopold Masson L.L. D. (January 10, 1907 – February 9, 1996) was a Canadian painter, known for his depictions of scenes in the province of Quebec.

== Career ==
Henri Masson (born in Spy, Belgium) was introduced to art as a youngster and had an early ambition to be an artist. He studied art in high school in Brussels as a teenager and came to Canada with his mother in 1921. They settled in Ottawa, where he was employed in a metal-engraving shop. He became a master engraver at the age of 25, a profession he would maintain until 1945.

Visiting the National Gallery of Canada he discovered the work of the Group of Seven and decided to become a painter. He studied at the Ottawa Art Association with George Rowles and Franklin Brownell. By the early 1930s Masson was associated with Les Confrères artistes Le Caveau, where he taught, exhibited, and met fellow artists Wilfrid Flood, Tom Wood, and later, Jean-Philippe Dallaire. He had his first solo shows in the mid-1930s and in 1945 decided to paint full-time, choosing as his subject scenes in the province of Quebec, and later, finding subjects internationally.

Masson exhibited in numerous solo and group shows, including the 1939 World's Fair, NY, International Water Colour Exhibition, Brooklyn, N.Y. (1944), Canadian Art in Brazil, Rio de Janeiro (1945–46), UNESCO, Paris (1946), Six Canadian Painters West Palm Beach (1947), Canadian Painting, National Gallery of Art, Washington, D.C. (1950), Colombo International Exhibition of Modern Art, New Delhi (1953) and the Quebec Pavilion, Expo '70, Osaka, Japan.

In 1972, Masson had a painting reproduced by UNICEF and in 1974, his painting Skaters in Hull was reproduced on a Canadian 8-cent stamp. His work is in the collection of the National Gallery of Canada the Art Gallery of Ontario; the Musée national des beaux-arts du Québec; Art Gallery of Hamilton, Ont.; the Remai Modern, Saskatoon; Art Gallery of Windsor; and internationally in the Hirshhorn Museum and Sculpture Garden.

Masson was a member of the Ontario Society of Artists (1938), the Canadian Group of Painters (1942), the Canadian Society of Painters in Water Colour (1942), the Canadian Society of Graphic Art (1942), and the Federation of Canadian Artists (1945). With Wilfrid Flood, he was a founding member of Les Confreres du Caveau, an Ottawa association of painters. In 1955, Masson received an LL.D. from Assumption College (now Assumption University), Windsor, Ontario.

From 1948 to 1950 he was instructor of children's classes at the National Gallery of Canada; instructor at Queen's University Summer School (1948-1952); Banff School of Fine Arts (1954); Ashbury College, Ott. (1954); Doon School of Fine Arts, Ont. (1960-1964), and taught private classes at his studio. In 1994, he was made Officer of the Order of Canada. He died in 1996 in Ottawa.

== Legacy ==
Rue Henri-Masson is a street in Sainte-Catherine, Roussillon, Quebec, in the suburbs of Montreal, named for the artist in 1979. In 2001 the city of Ottawa honoured Masson and photographer Yousuf Karsh for their contributions to Canadian art by naming its 457-square-metre gallery space at City Hall the Karsh-Masson Gallery.
