= Horatio Walker =

Canadian painter (1858–1938)

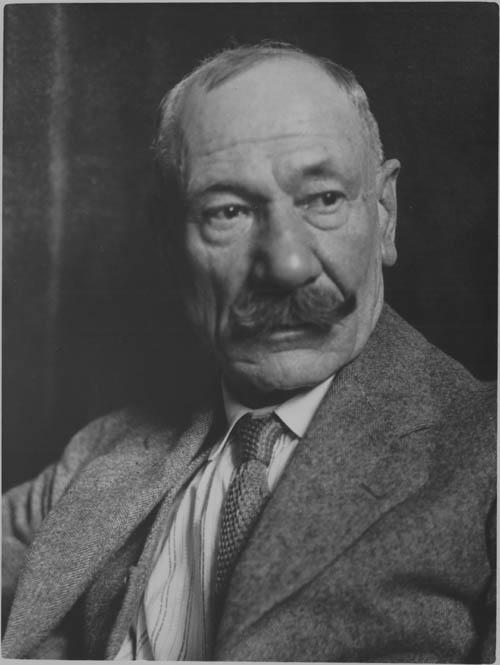
- Horatio Walker, undated, photographed by M.O. Hammond
- Born: May 12, 1858; Listowel, Canada West
- Died: September 27, 1938 (aged 80); Sainte Pétronille, Quebec, Canada
- Known for: Painter
- Notable work: Oxen Drinking (1899) and Ploughing—The First Gleam at Dawn (1900)
- Movement: American Barbizon School, founding member Canadian Art Club (1907–1915)
- Spouse: Jeanette Pretty (m. 1883)

Horatio Walker RI RCA LL.D. (May 12, 1858 – September 27, 1938) was a Canadian painter. He worked in oils and watercolours, often depicting scenes of rural life in Canada with special attention to French Canadian rural tradition. He was influenced by the Barbizon school and the French realist tradition.

== Life and work ==
=== Early life ===
Horatio Walker's Watching the Turkeys, not dated.

Walker was born in Listowel, Upper Canada in 1858, to parents Thomas and Jeanne Maurice Walker. Thomas Walker emigrated in 1856 from Yorkshire, England, to Listowel, Canada West with his wife of French and English heritage. Thomas purchased land for lumber in the western area of the United Province of Canada and Horatio was raised in relative comfort. His interest in art may originate from his father who crafted small figures as a hobby, and both his father and the local school teacher encouraged drawing as a pastime.

In 1870, on Walker's 12th birthday, his father brought him to Quebec City, Quebec, for the first time. His father made occasional business trips to the city as part of his timber business. During this sojourn, they visited the Île d'Orléans, in search of pine timber. Walker made subsequent visits to Quebec City during the following years. His formal schooling ended at the Listowel Public School in 1872; he never went on to pursue formal academic training in art. At the age of 15, Walker moved to Toronto, Ontario to apprentice with the photographic firm Notman and Fraser. It was a fortunate opportunity, as several successful artists also worked there; Walker learned watercolour from Robert Ford Gagen, miniature portrait painting from John Arthur Fraser, and painting from Lucius Richard O'Brien and Henri Perré.

=== Mature life and career ===
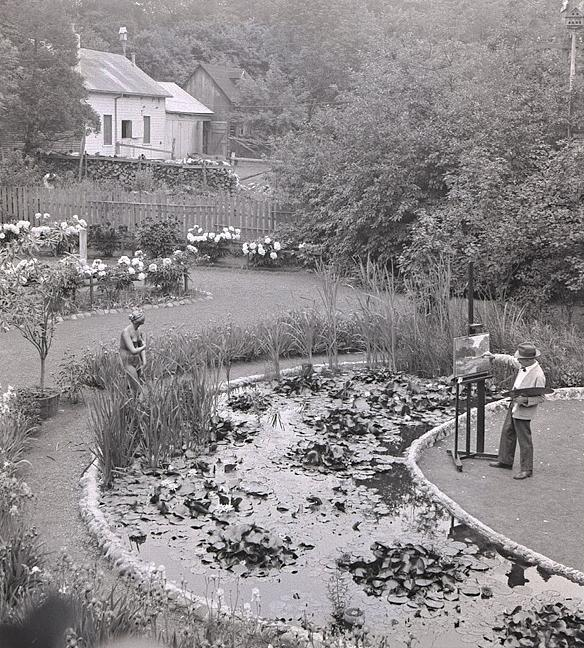
Walker painting in his Ste-Pétronille garden, 1933

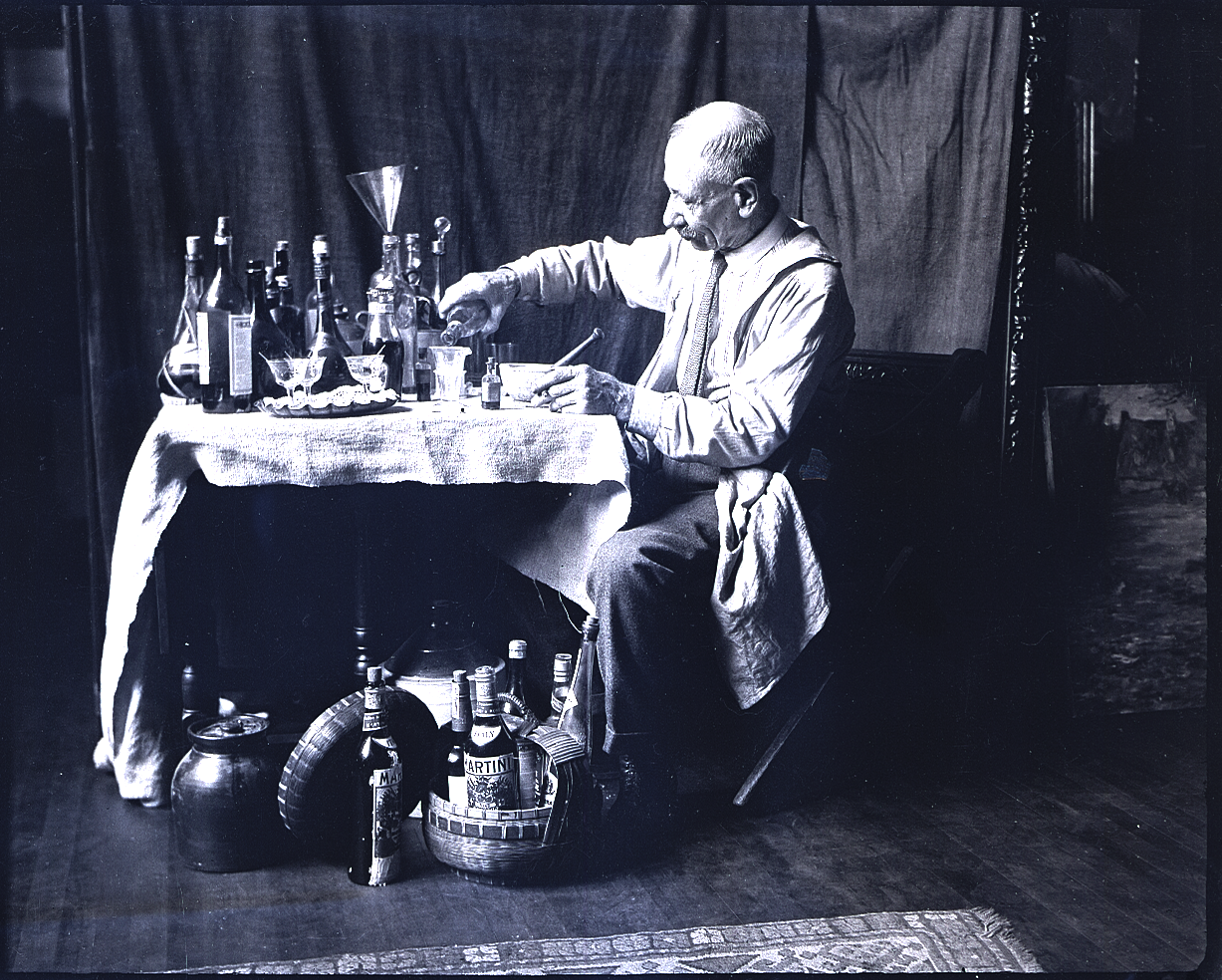
Horatio Walker in his studio, Ile d'Orleans, 1926

Walker was only at the firm for three years until he moved to the United States of America for uncertain reasons. Writing in 1928, Hector Charlesworth suggested that Walker was "chucked down the stairs" and fired for quarrelling with a family relative. However, it is more likely that Walker travelled to Philadelphia for the American Centennial in 1876, an exhibition where Notman and Fraser won the international award, which gave the firm the privilege of exclusive photographic rights for the celebrations. Ultimately, Walker may have decided to stay and pursue painting.

During the period of Walker's life around 1878, he would have become familiar with the painters of the Barbizon school, which were at the time, exhibited in American museums and galleries. In 1880, Walker made an extended trip to Europe to learn more about Barbizon methods, and its agrarian subject matter, that would come to define his painting for the rest of his life.

What happened with Walker during the two following years remains vague, but in 1878, he opened a studio in New York City. During the 1880s, Walker's parents moved to Rochester, New York, and Walker participated in the founding of the Rochester Art Club. A further sign of Walker's growing success was an invitation to join the American Watercolour membership in 1882. In 1883 he married Jeanette Pretty (died 1938) of Toronto. They had two children, Alice (1884–1891) and Horatio Jr. (1886–1910). It was sometime during this period that Walker purchased a residence on Île d'Orléans in the village of Sainte-Pétronille. From now on until his retirement, Walker would spend his summers in Quebec and winters in his New York City studio.

Walker's personal life was disastrous: his daughter died of diphtheria, his son of tuberculosis and his wife Jeanette, was committed to hospital permanently in 1914 due to paranoia. These tragedies do not seem to have influenced his painting; Walker's subject matter and style remained constant throughout his career without much variation.

== Memberships and organizations ==
Walker was a member of several artists' organizations, including the American Watercolor Society (1882), the Royal Canadian Academy of Arts (associate member in 1883, full member in 1913), the Society of American Artists (1887), the National Academy of Design (associate member in 1890, full member in 1891), and the British Institute of Watercolours (1901). He was a founding member of the Canadian Art Club, which elected him as its president in 1915. In 1928, he officially retired and moved to Sainte-Pétronille, Quebec. He died there on September 27, 1938.

== Awards and prizes ==
Monument to Horatio Walker in Saint Roch square

- Gold medals, American Art Gallery, New York (1887, 1889)
- Evans Prize, American Watercolor Society (1888)
- Bronze medal, World Exposition, Paris, France (1889)
- Gold medal, World's Columbian Exposition, Chicago, Illinois (1893)
- Gold medal, Pan-American Exposition, Buffalo, New York (1901)
- Gold medal, Charleston Exposition, Charleston, South Carolina (1902)
- Two gold medals (for oil and watercolor), Louisiana Purchase Exposition, St. Louis, Missouri (1904)
- Medal of honor, Pennsylvania Academy of Fine Art, Philadelphia, Pennsylvania (1906)
- First prize, Worcester Art Museum, Worcester, Massachusetts (1907)
- Gold medal, Pan-Pacific International Exposition, San Francisco, California (1915)

He was awarded honorary doctorates from the University of Toronto (1916) and Université Laval, Québec City (1938).

Walker has been designated as an Historic Person in the Directory of Federal Heritage Designations.

== Selected works ==
- A Canadian Pastoral
- After the Wedding
- An Old Islander
- At Low Tide
- Ave Maria
- Boeuf à l'abreuvoir
- By the Fireside
- Canoe Cove
- Célestin
- Corner of Pig Lane in Québec
- Corner of Sainte-Pétronille
- Corner of the Stable
- De Profundis
- Deo Gratias
- Église de l'Île-aux-Grues
- Fagot Gatherers
- Farmhouse Interior
- First Snow
- Fishing Nets
- Girl with Turkeys
- Golden Dew
- Hauling the Log
- Hauling Wood
- Hay Making
- Horses at Trough
- Ice Cutters
- Interior of a House
- Killing Pigs
- La Rencontre
- La soue à cochons
- La tonte du mouton
- Le vieux four
- Little White Pigs and their Mother
- Man Sawing Wood
- Maple Sugar Harvest
- Mare and Foal
- Milk Maid Île d'Orléans
- Milking Early Morn
- Milking on the Batture
- Morning Île d'Orléans
- Morning Sainte-Pétronille
- Old House at Sainte-Famille
- Oxen drinking
- Oxen Ploughing
- Peasant Scraping Pig
- Pétronille de Saint-François
- Potato Gatherers
- Preparing the Feed
- Sheep Shearers
- Spring Forage
- The Bake Oven
- The Farmer's Wife
- The Gardener
- The Harrow
- The Rainbow
- The Return
- The Royal Mail
- The Sheep Fold
- The Shepherdess
- The Smugglers
- The Sorcerers
- The Thresher
- The Turkey Girl
- Tournant la herse
- Tree Fellers
- Turkeys
- Turning the Harrow
- Unloading Hay Boat
- Vieille Maison à Ste-Famille
- Way-Side Shrine at Saint-Laurent
- Winter
- Wood-Cutters
