= William Cruikshank (painter) =

British painter

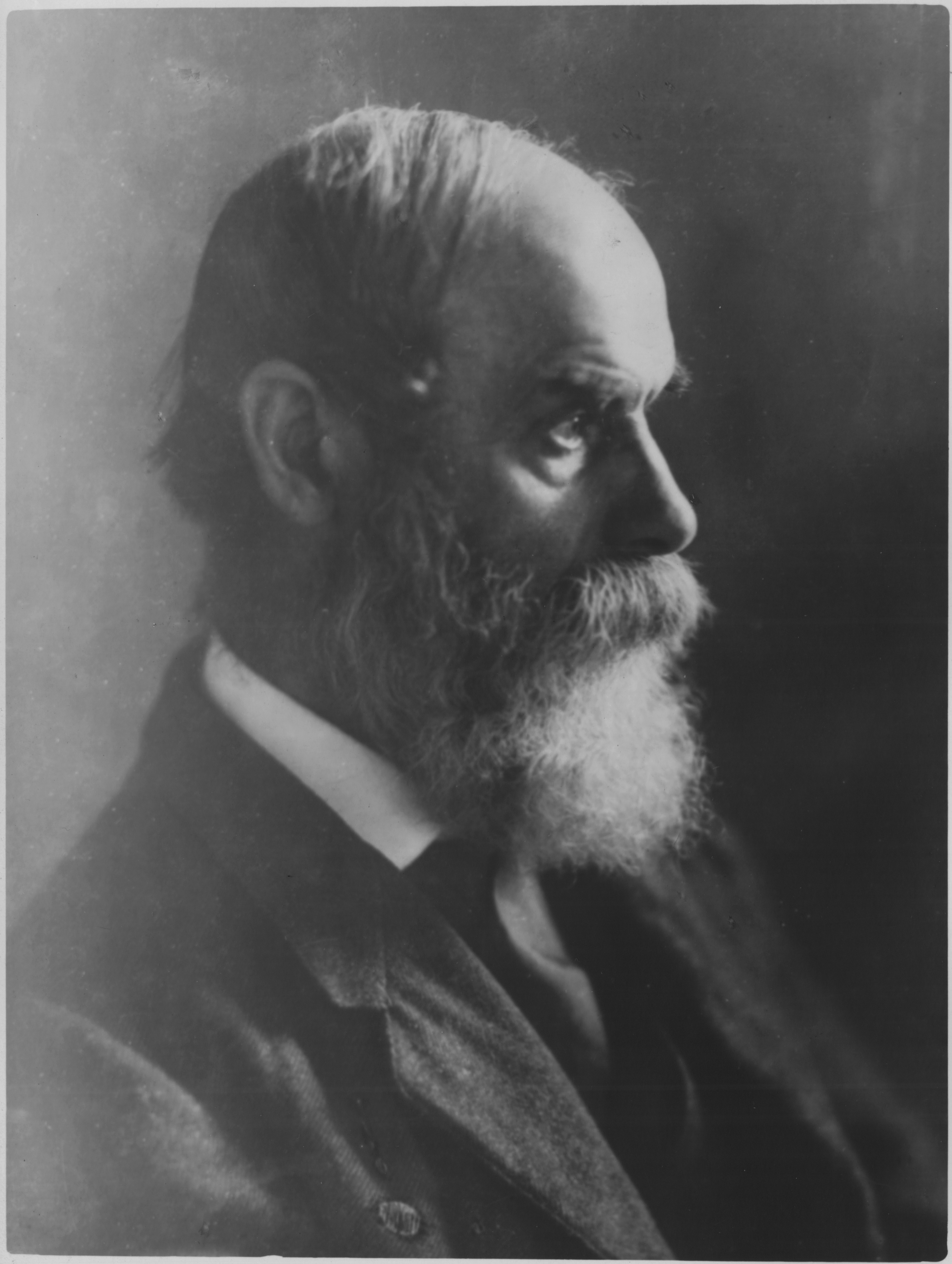
- Born: 1848/9; Broughty Ferry, Scotland, United Kingdom
- Died: 1922 (aged 72 or 73); Kansas City, Missouri, United States
- Education: Royal Scottish Academy; Royal Academy of Arts
- Known for: Painter
- Elected: Associate Royal Canadian Academy of Arts

William Cruikshank (1848/9 – 1922) (Note: The National Gallery of Canada provides birth and death dates of 25 December 1848 and 19 May 1922, respectively. Robert Stacey and Dennis Reid instead simply provide the years 1849 and 1922. The National Gallery of Canada further provides his birthplace as Broughty Ferry, Scotland and his death place as Kansas City, Missouri.) was a British painter and the grand-nephew of George Cruikshank. He studied art at the Royal Scottish Academy in Edinburgh, at the Royal Academy School in London with Frederic Leighton and John Everett Millais, and in Paris at the Atelier Yvon. His last studies were interrupted by the Franco-Prussian War.

== Career ==
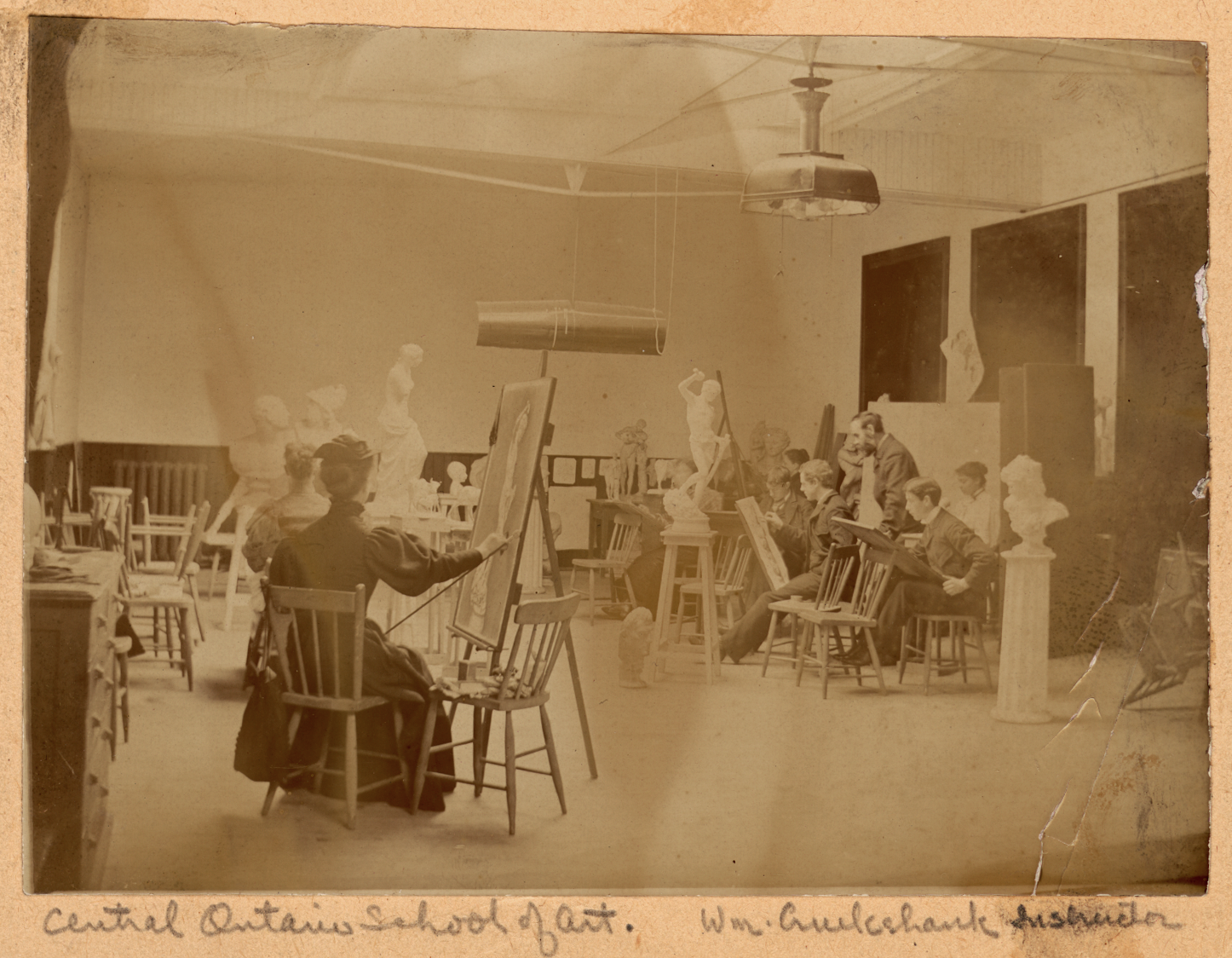
Inside the Central Ontario School of Art and Industrial Design in the late-19th century, a school Cruikshank was an instructor at. Cruikshank is pictured in the background.

In 1871, Cruikshank settled in Canada, opened a studio in Toronto and for over 30 years was an instructor in the Central Ontario School of Art, later the Ontario College of Art, teaching how to draw from the antique (casts) and from life. He claimed to have been responsible for bring the pen-and-ink technique of Europe to North America. As a major member of the Toronto Art Students' League, he encouraged his students to follow the motto Nulla Dies Sine Linea (No Day without a Line). Eventual Group of Seven founder, J. E. H. MacDonald, would later say that the northern movement and search for a new Canadian art began with the work of Cruikshank and George Agnew Reid.

In 1884 he was elected an associate member of the Royal Canadian Academy of Arts and acquired a considerable reputation as a portrait and figure painter, and as a painter of Canadian scenes. In 1885 he became a founding member of the Toronto Etching society, and the following year was commissioned by Sir William Van Horne to paint in the Canadian Rockies as part of the Canadian Pacific Railway's public relations program. Some of his paintings are in the National Gallery of Canada and Art Gallery of Ontario. Ploughing, Lower St. Lawrence (c. 1899, Art Gallery of Ontario) reveals his attention to the environment of Canada: it is a landscape subject of habitants in rural Quebec.

=== Cruikshank and Tom Thomson ===
It has been suggested that around 1906 or 1907, Tom Thomson took private lessons from Cruikshank at the Ontario College of Art and Design. Only two sources corroborate this however. The first is a single undated note from Cruikshank to professor James Mavor, arranging to bring a "Tomson" [sic] to meet him. Further complicating the matter is that the original class list no longer survives. The second is a letter from H. B. Jackson to Blodwen Davies, writing, "Tom studied from life & the antique in art school. If I remember right Cruikshank was the instructor." Cruikshank was likely Thomson's only art instructor in an art school.

There also are indications in Thomson`s early work that suggest Cruikshank may have been his teacher. Thomson's painting, reputed to be his first oil, Young Man with a Team of Horses, though modest, is said to have caused Cruikshank to tell him, he'd better "keep on". The theme of ploughing Thomson used is found in Cruikshank's Ploughing, Lower St. Lawrence and may indicate Thomson knew the work of Cruikshank. Also, if Thomson had Cruikshank as a teacher, he would have been encouraged by his instructor to carry a pocket sketchbook and obtain constant practice in drawing, and Thomson did fill such sketchbooks with drawings c. 1906.

== Gallery ==
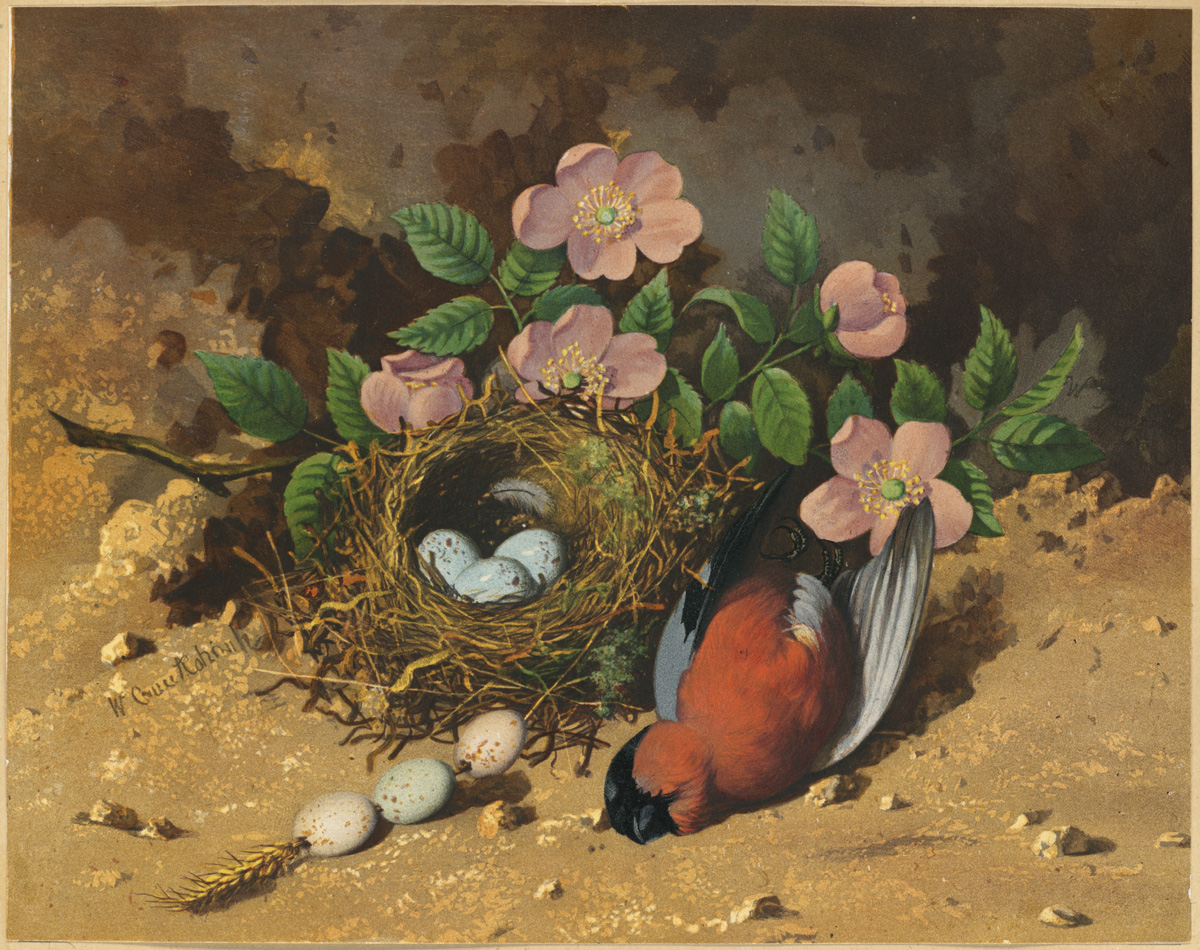
Bullfinch, 1861–97. Boston Public Library

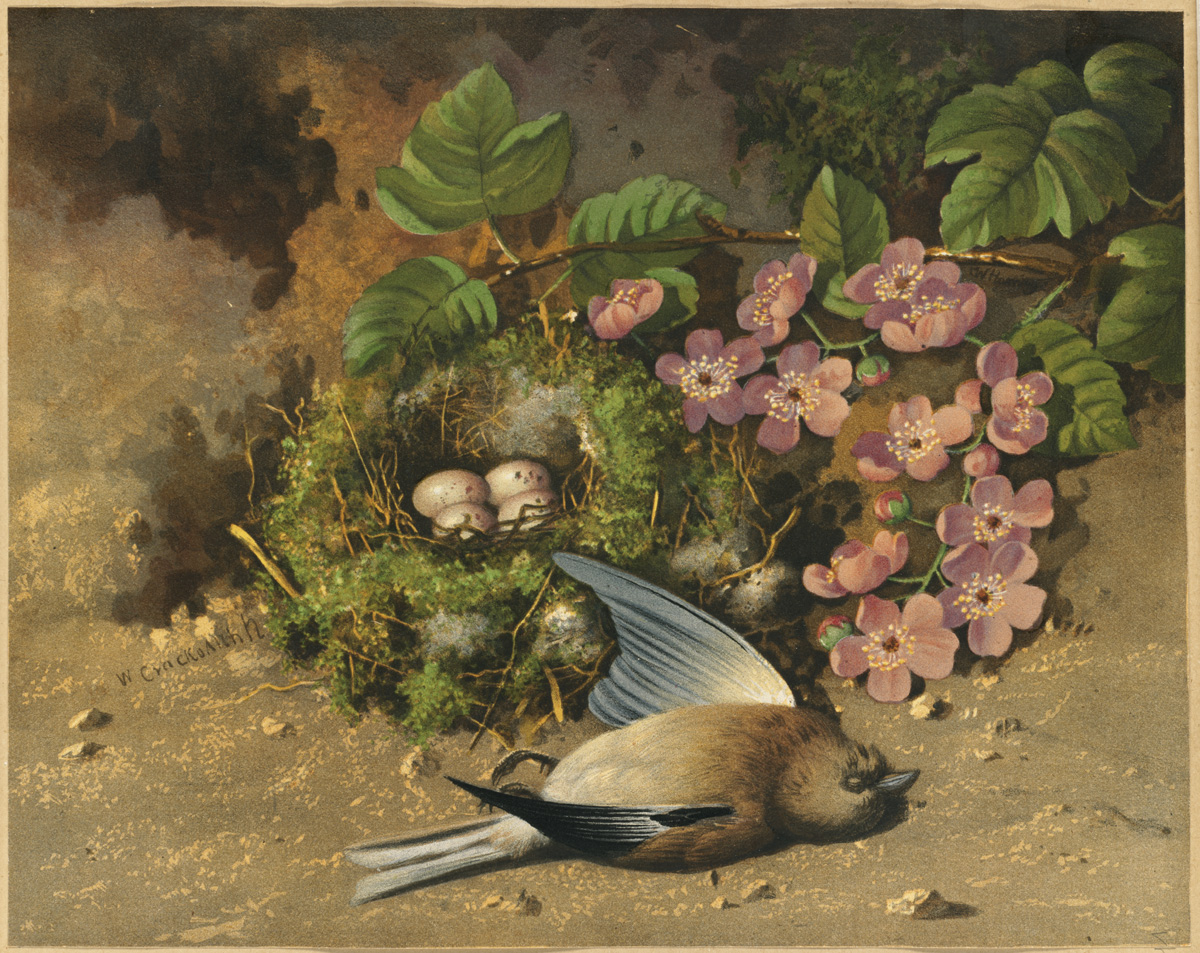
Linnet, 1861–97. Boston Public Library

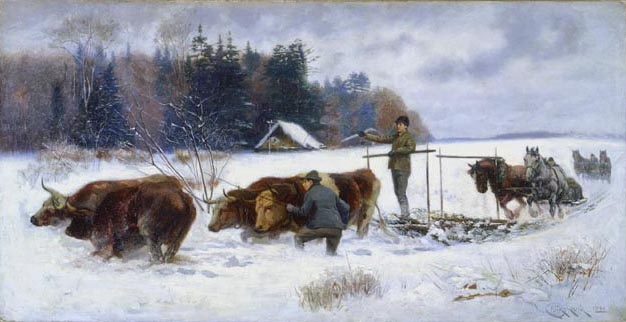
Breaking a Road, 1894. National Gallery of Canada, Ottawa

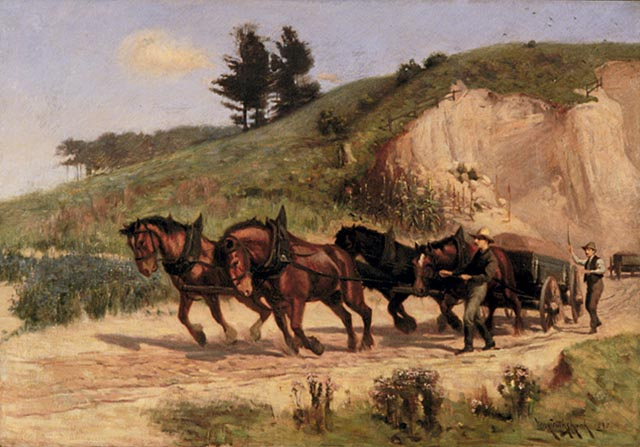
Sand Wagon, 1895. National Gallery of Canada, Ottawa
