= Franklin Brownell =

American painter (1857–1946)

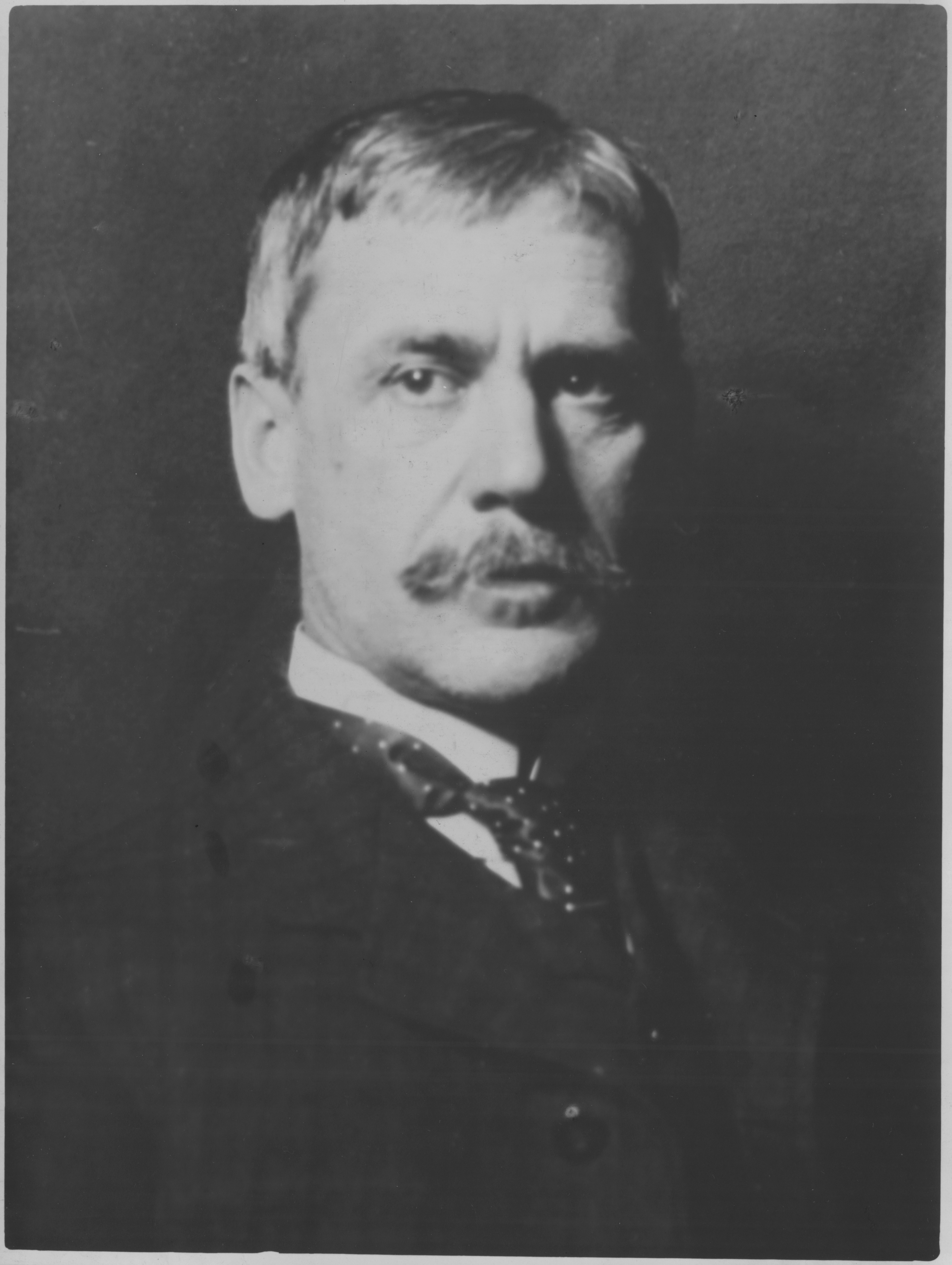
- Born: Peleg Franklin Brownell; July 27, 1857; New Bedford, Massachusetts
- Died: March 13, 1946 (aged 88); Ottawa
- Education: Boston School of the Museum of Fine Arts, Académie Julian
- Known for: Painter
- Spouse: Louise Nickerson (m. 1889)

Franklin Brownell RCA (born Peleg Franklin Brownell, also known as Franklin Peleg Brownell) (July 27, 1857 – March 13, 1946) was a landscape painter, draughtsman and teacher active in Canada. His artistic career in Ottawa spanned over fifty years.

== Biography ==
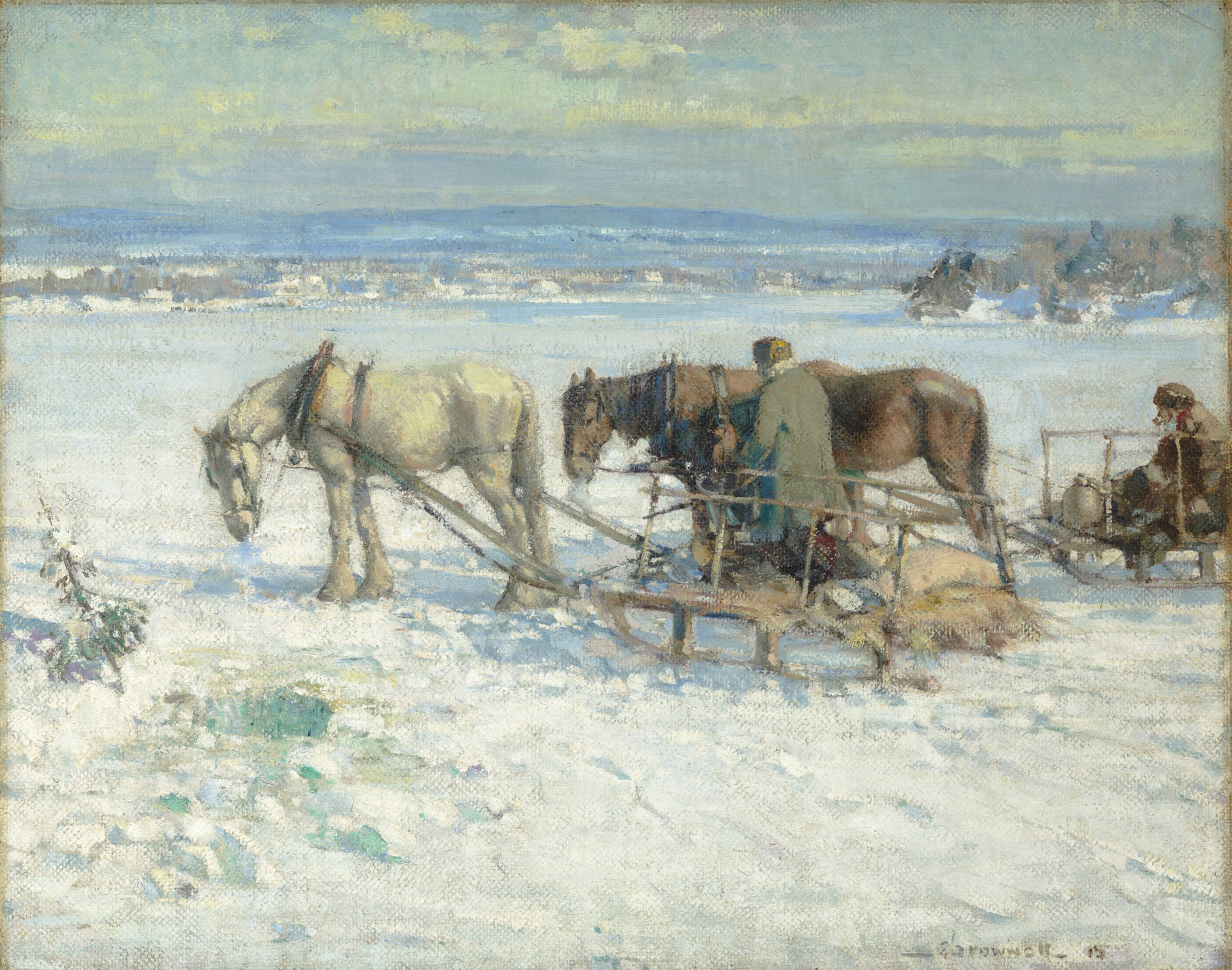
Franklin Brownell – Peche sur glace, collines de la Gatineau, 1915

Brownell studied at the Boston Tufts School of the Museum of Fine Arts in 1879 and at the Académie Julian in Paris from 1880 to 1883 with William-Adolphe Bouguereau, Tony Robert-Fleury and Léon Bonnat. There he met fellow expatriate and Canadian painter William Brymner. After spending some time in Montreal, Brownell moved to Ottawa in 1886 to take up the position of Headmaster of the Ottawa School of Art until 1900. He accepted the same position as headmaster between 1900 and 1937 with the Women's Art Association in Ottawa, later renamed the Art Association of Ottawa. Among his students were Pegi Nicol MacLeod, Henri Masson and Robert Tait McKenzie.

Brownell was elected a member of the Royal Canadian Academy of Arts in 1895, and the Ontario Society of Artists in 1899. He was also a founding member of the Canadian Art Club in Toronto in 1907. Through the club, he became friendly with Maurice Cullen and James Wilson Morrice. As a result, his palette began to lighten. His most impressionist paintings were painted on several trips to the West Indies between 1911 and 1915. Other painting trips he took were to the Gaspé and Gatineau regions of Quebec, to Algonquin Provincial Park and other areas around Ottawa in Ontario.

Besides landscapes, he produced portraits, flower studies, marine and genre scenes in oil, watercolour and pastel. Though celebrated as an Impressionist, Brownell also created social realist depictions of the city, demonstrating a sensitivity to urban concerns that was rare among his contemporaries.

== Exhibitions ==
- 1893 Chicago World's Columbian Exposition
- 1900 he won a bronze medal at the Paris World's Fair exhibition for The Photographer
- 1904, Canadian exhibition at the Louisiana Purchase Exposition, St Louis,
- In 1922, he was honored with a retrospective exhibition of his work at the National Gallery of Canada. He was the first artist to receive this honor.
- 1924–25, British Empire Exhibition, 1924–25
- 1998, North by South: The Art of Peleg Franklin Brownell, major retrospective at the Ottawa Art Gallery

== Collections ==
- National Gallery of Canada
- Winnipeg Art Gallery
- Musée d’Orsay

== Record sale prices ==
At the June 8 2023 Cowley Abbott Auction Artwork from an Important Private Collection - Part II, Tea Time (1901), oil on canvas laid on board, 15.5 x 11.5 ins ( 39.4 x 29.2 cms ), Auction Estimate: $12,000.00 - $15,000.00, realized a price of $90,000.00.
