= Mary Hiester Reid =

American-Canadian painter (1854–1921)

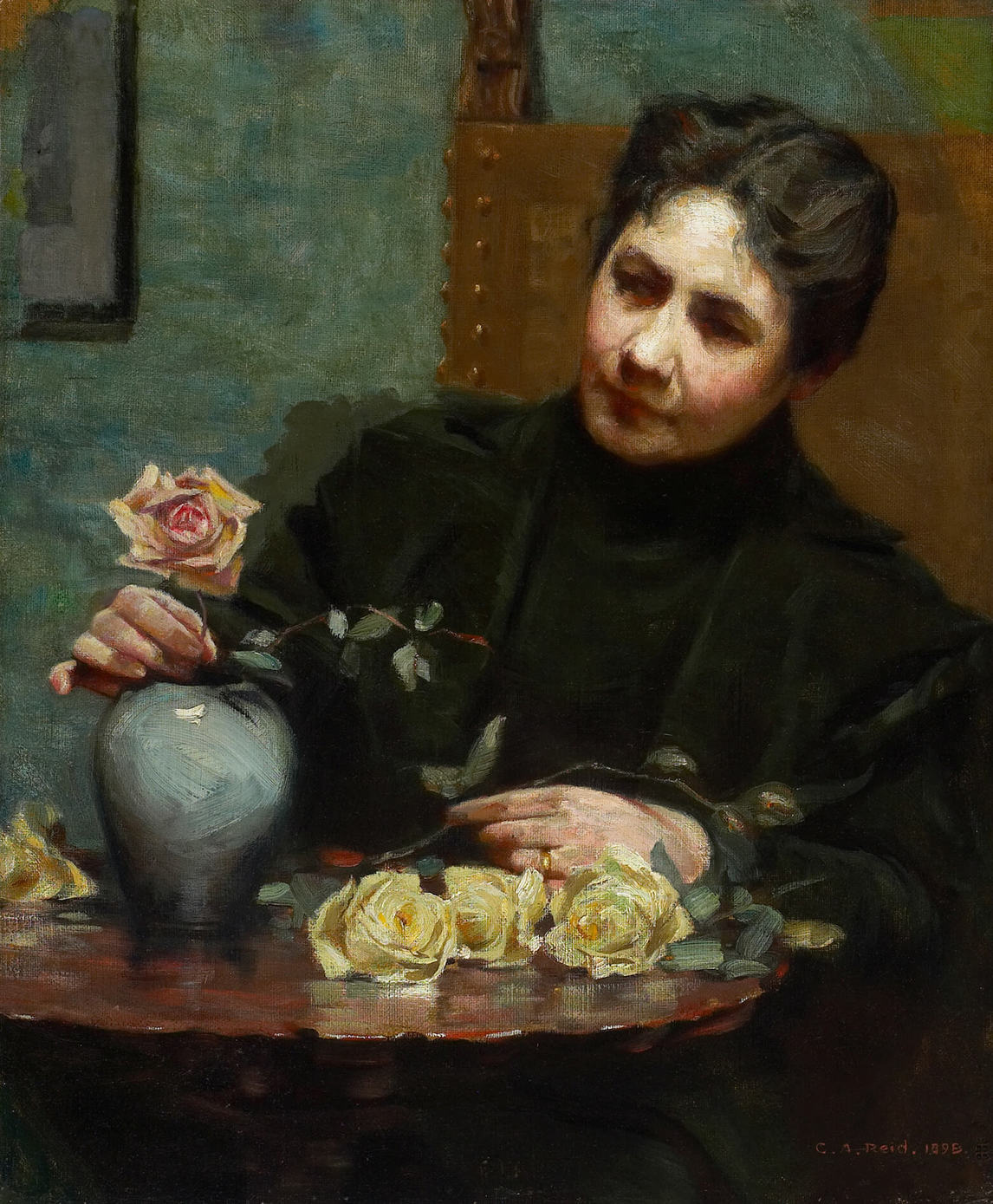
- Mary Hiester Reid by George Agnew Reid, 1898
- Born: Mary Augusta Catharine Hiester; April 10, 1854; Reading, Pennsylvania
- Died: October 4, 1921 (aged 67); Toronto, Ontario, Canada
- Education: Philadelphia School of Design; Pennsylvania Academy of the Fine Arts; Académie Colarossi
- Known for: Painter
- Spouse: George Agnew Reid (m. 1885)

Mary Augusta Hiester Reid who signed her name M. H. Reid (10 April 1854 – 4 October 1921) was an American-born Canadian painter and teacher. She was best known as a painter of floral still lifes, some of them called "devastatingly expressive" by a contemporary author, and by 1890 she was thought to be the most important flower painter in Canada. She also painted domesticated landscapes, night scenes, and, less frequently, studio interiors and figure studies. Her work as a painter is related in a broad sense to Tonalism and Aestheticism or "art for art's sake".

She was made a member of the Ontario Society of Artists in 1887, and in 1907 became only the second woman to serve on its executive committee. She was also one of the first women to be elected an Associate of the Royal Canadian Academy of Arts (RCA) in 1893. She was elected to join the Canadian Society of Applied Art in 1904.

== Biography ==
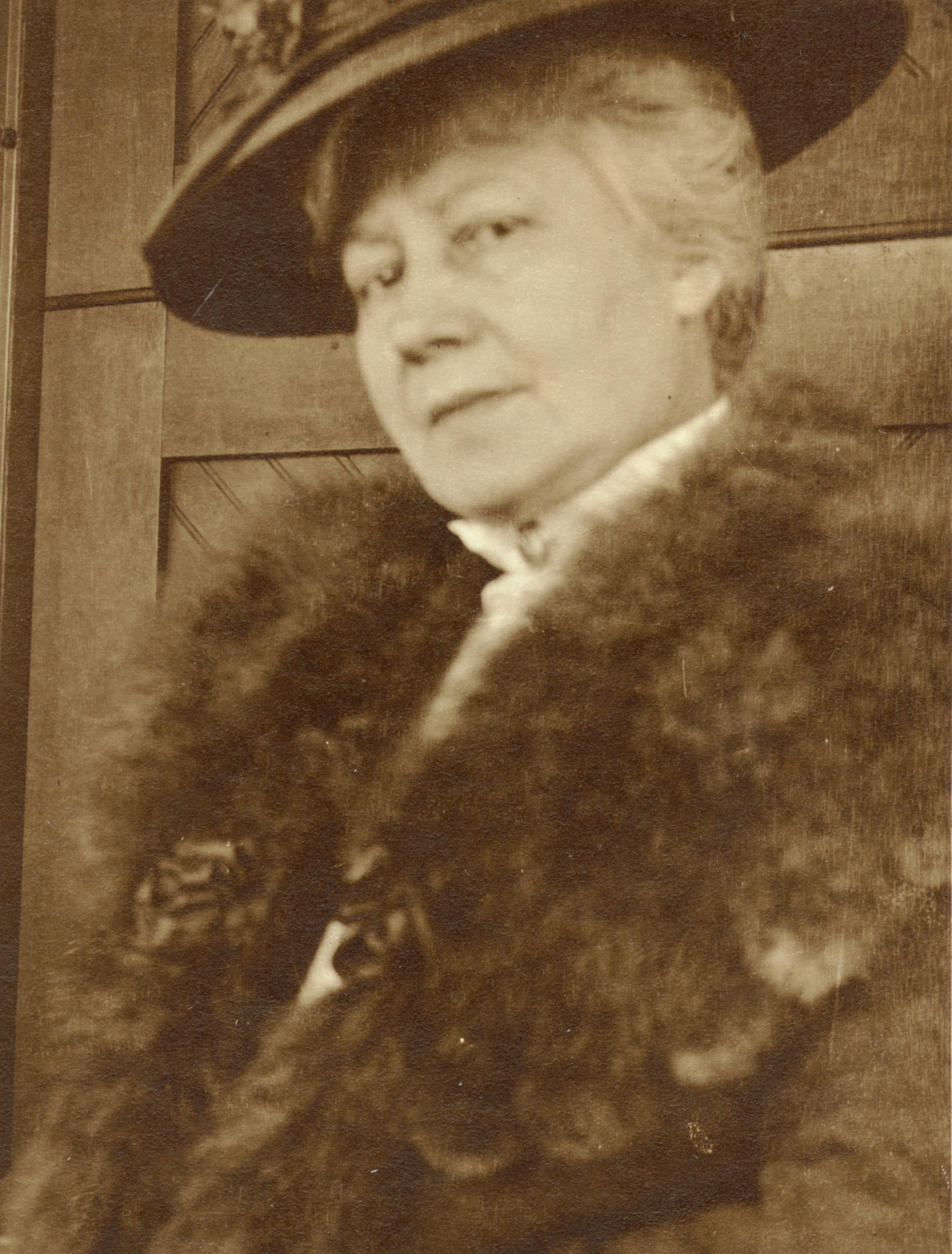
Mary Hiester Reid, [ca. 1900]

Reid was born in Reading, Pennsylvania on April 10, 1854. From 1883 to 1885, Reid studied painting at the Pennsylvania Academy of the Fine Arts with Thomas Eakins. While at the Academy, she met her future husband Canadian artist George Agnew Reid (1860–1947). The lectures at PAFA were coeducational, and this is likely where the couple began their courtship. They were married in May of 1885 in Mary's hometown. From 1888 to 1889, she studied at the Académie Colarossi in Paris, taking costume-study and life classes. She studied there again in 1896.

During the 19th and early 20th century, at the time of her schooling, women were rarely allowed to pursue art as a career. If they attended art school, they were often not taught the same subjects as men. Although they both attended art school, Mary was restricted to traditionally feminine themes, and in turn became known for her flower paintings. Despite the expectations for women to remain at home and care for children, Mary rose to prominence and became one of the first women to have her work included in the collection of National Gallery of Canada.

Reid exhibited her work at the Palace of Fine Arts at the 1893 World's Columbian Exposition in Chicago, Illinois and at the exhibitions of the Ontario Society of Artists and the Royal Canadian Academy of Arts, the Art Association of Montreal, the Women's Art Association of Canada, and the Canadian National Exhibition. She also exhibited her work at the Pan-American exposition in Buffalo (1901), and the Canadian exhibition at the Louisiana Purchase Exposition in St Louis (1904), with Mary Evelyn Wrinch at the galleries of the Art Metropole in Toronto (1912), and with her husband and Wrinch at the Royal Ontario Museum, in aid of the Red Cross Society (1915). In addition to producing paintings that were widely admired, Mary became financially successful and received significant reviews in the Toronto press. In 1893, she was elected an Associate of the Royal Canadian Academy of Arts, one of the first women elected.

== Legacy ==
A retrospective show of Reid's work was held in 1922 at the Art Gallery of Toronto, following her death on October 4, 1921. It included 308 works. She was the first woman to posthumously receive a solo retrospective exhibition at that institution. In 2000, Mary Hiester Reid's work was rediscovered (suggested CBC Radio, 21 June 2020) when the Art Gallery of Ontario held an exhibition titled, Quiet Harmony: The Art of Mary Hiester Reid, curated by Brian Foss and Janice Anderson. Flower Diary: In Which Mary Hiester Reid Paints, Travels, Marries & Opens a Door, a biography of the artist by Molly Peacock has been published by ECW Press in 2021. In 2021, the Art Gallery of Ontario exhibited The Open Door: Mary Hiester Reid and Helen McNicoll.

== Selected public collections ==
- Metropolitan Museum, New York;
- National Gallery of Canada, Ottawa;
- Art Gallery of Ontario, Toronto;
- Art Gallery of Hamilton;
- Robert McLaughlin Gallery, Oshawa;
- Art Windsor-Essex;
- Museum London;
- Agnes Etherington Art Centre;Kingston
- University of Lethbridge;

== See also ==
- Ontario Society of Artists

== Gallery ==
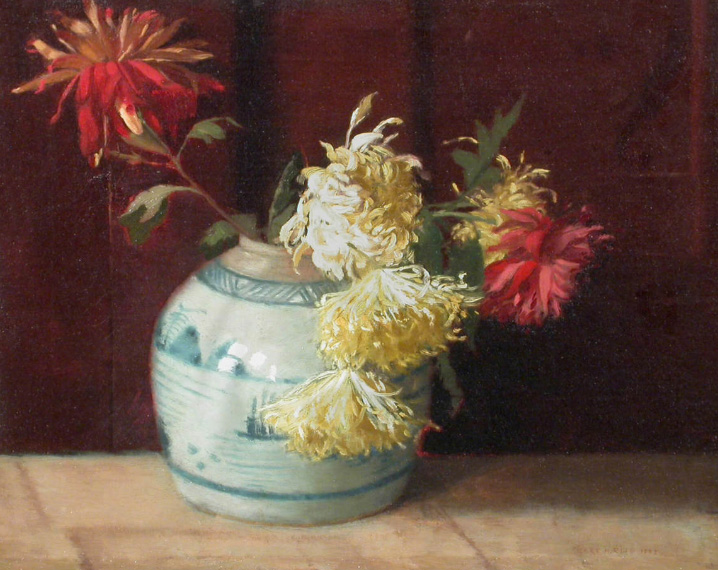
Mary Hiester Reid Chrysanthemums in a Qing Blue and White Vase, 1892

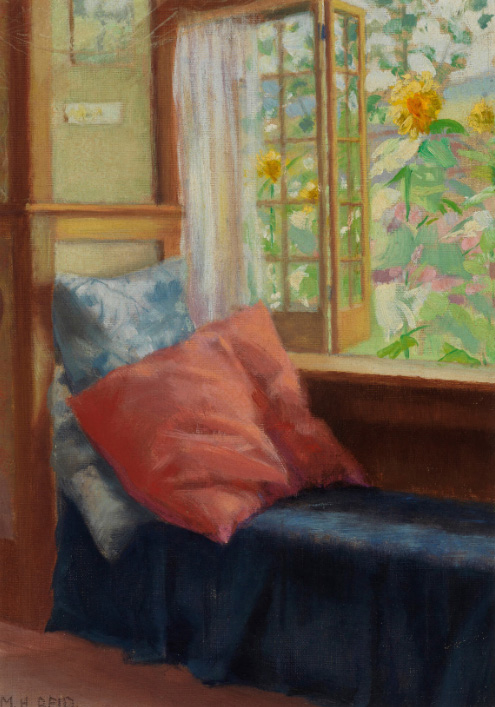
Mary Hiester Reid Interior with a Garden View, n.d

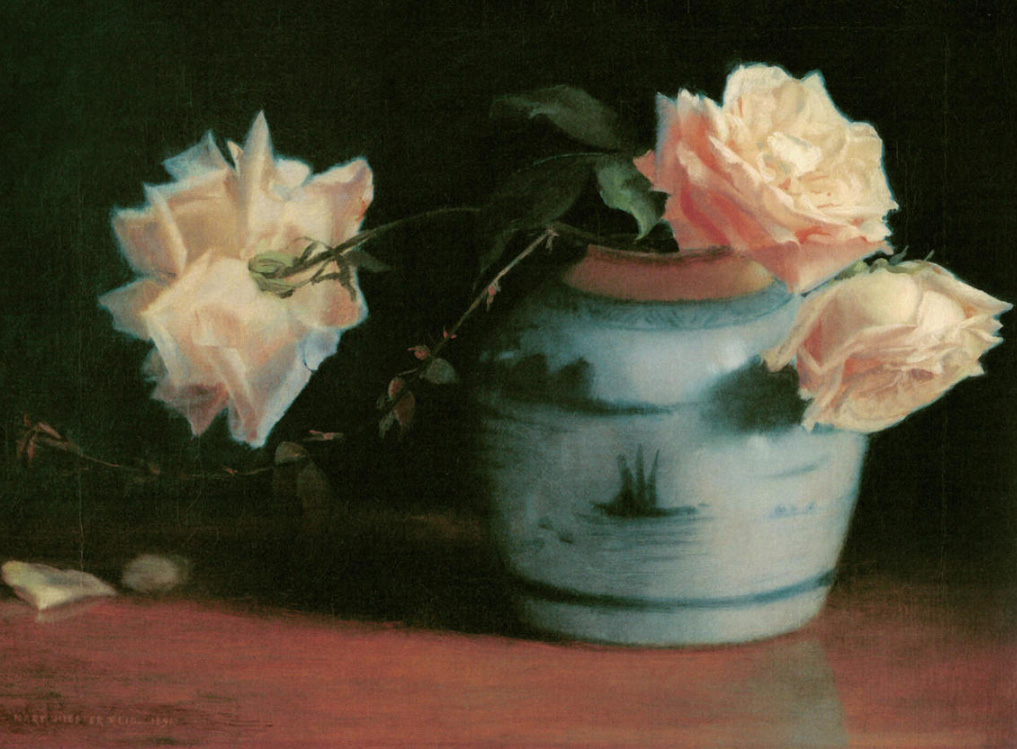
Mary Hiester Reid Roses in a Vase 1891. Metropolitan Museum, NY
