= William Hope (artist) =

Canadian artist

William R. Hope
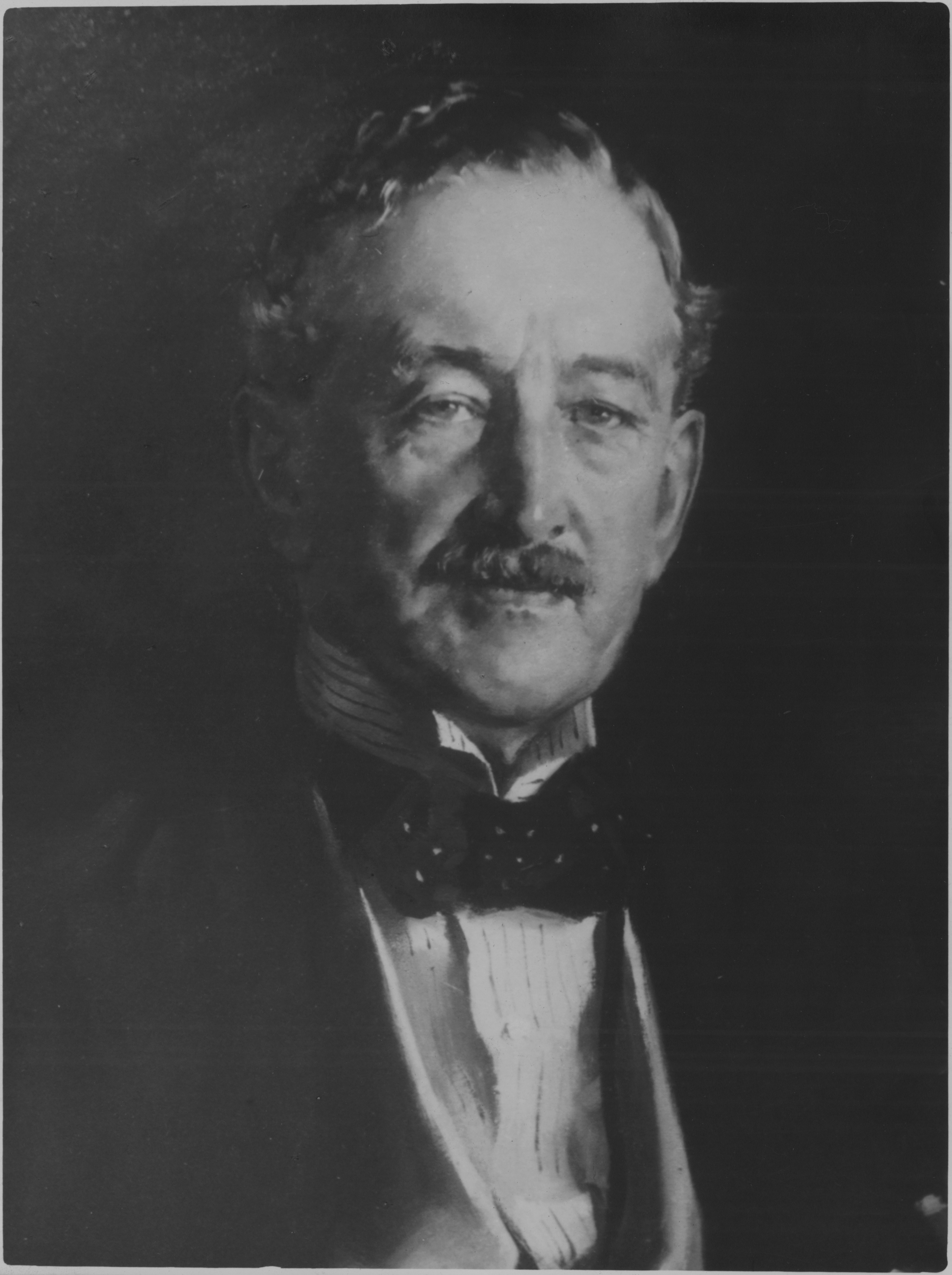
- Born: May 18, 1863; Montreal, Canada East
- Died: February 5, 1931 (aged 67)
- Spouse: Constance Kingsmill Jarvis (1872-1960) (m. 1897)
- Elected: Member in 1902, Royal Canadian Academy

William R. Hope RCA (May 18, 1863- February 5, 1931), was a prominent Canadian painter, draftsman and war artist, noted for his landscapes.

== Early life and education ==
Born into a wealthy family at Montreal, Canada East, he travelled to Paris in the 1880s to study art, frequently practicing in the Forest of Fontainebleau. Afterwards he continued his studies in the Netherlands and Italy. Returning to Montreal, he quickly became an influential member of the Montreal art community and of the Royal Canadian Academy of Arts, to which he was elected a member of the council in 1906.

== Career ==
Hope painted in oils, watercolours and ink; travelling widely throughout rural Quebec drawing landscapes, harbours, boats, marine views, mountains, interiors and historic buildings; several of which can be seen at the McCord Museum. Hope was awarded a bronze medal for his work at the Canadian exhibition at the Louisiana Purchase Exposition in St. Louis, Missouri in 1904 and in 1924, his painting The Sand Bar was purchased for the permanent collection of the National Gallery of Canada.

In 1890, for the purpose of "social enjoyment, and the promotion of arts and letters", Hope founded the Pen and Pencil Club of Montreal. They first met at Hope's Montreal home on Dorchester Street in the Golden Square Mile, and after his death in 1931, the club continued to meet at the studios of Edmond Dyonnet, which were also on Dorchester Street. The Pen and Pencil Club quickly rose to prominence, and members (the club continued to meet until the 1960s) included William Brymner, Maurice Cullen, Edmond Dyonnet, Robert Harris, Stephen Leacock, Lt.-Colonel John McCrae, Sir William Cornelius Van Horne, William Henry Drummond, Louis-Honoré Fréchette, Henri Hébert, Ernest Cormier, William Sutherland Maxwell, Percy Erskine Nobbs and Sir Andrew Macphail. As women were not allowed to join, it helped precipitate the creation of the Women's Art Association of Canada in 1894.

He spent his summers at St. Andrews, N.B. and some of his drawings were done there.

== Residences ==
William Hope lived in a house designed for him by the Maxwell Brothers at 664 Dorchester Street West, with an attractive painting studio. He kept a summer house called "Dalmeny" at St. Andrews, New Brunswick - also designed by the Maxwells.

== Family ==
In 1897, he married Constance Kingsmill Jarvis (1872-1960), daughter of Arthur Murray Jarvis (1830-1918) of Toronto; nephew of William Botsford Jarvis. They were the parents of two children.

== Death ==
Hope died February 5, 1931, at the apartments he had retired to at the Ritz-Carlton Montreal Hotel.
