= Laura Muntz Lyall =

Canadian artist (1860-1930)

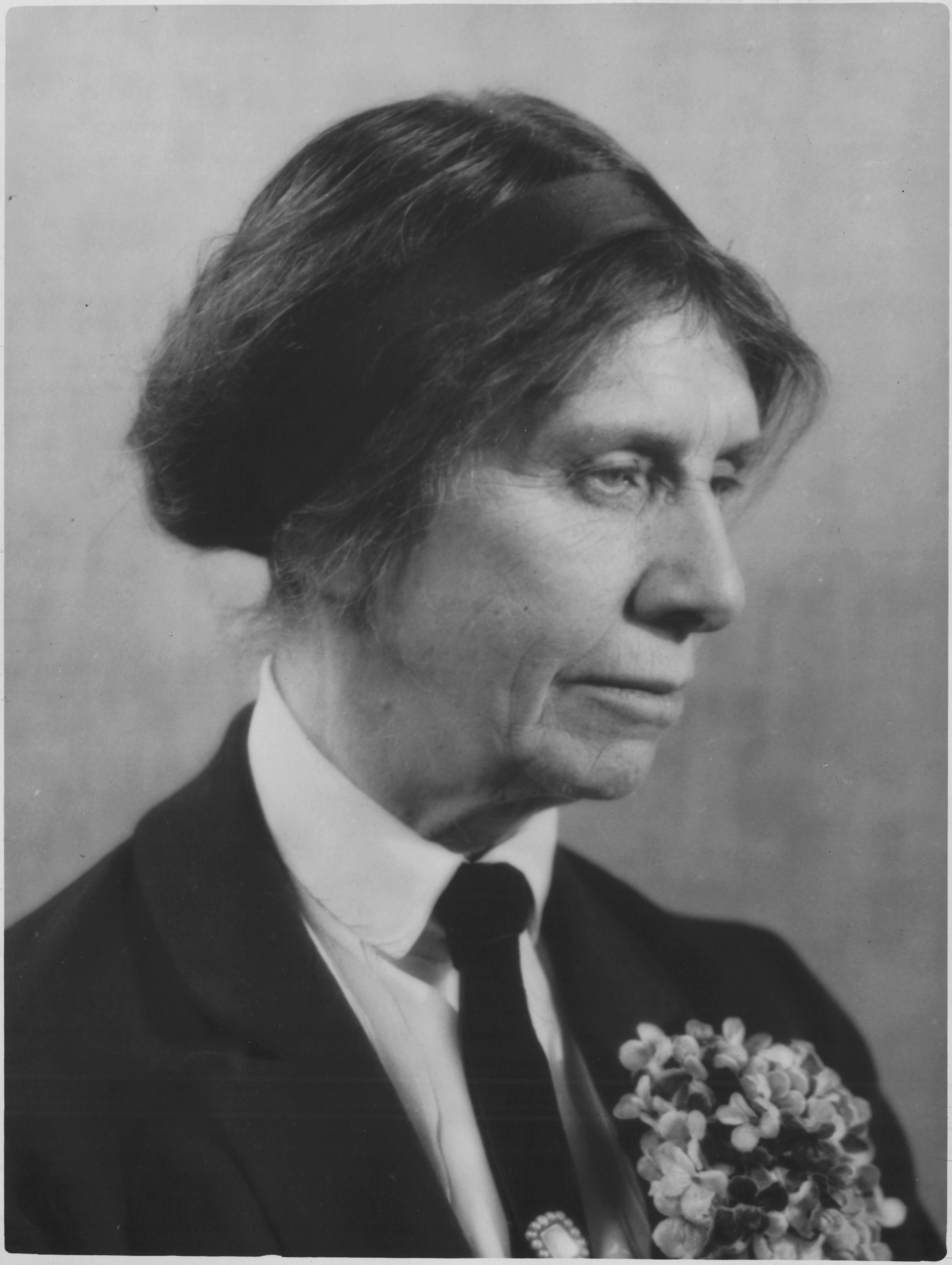
- Born: Laura Adeline Muntz; June 18, 1860; Royal Leamington Spa, Warwickshire, United Kingdom
- Died: December 9, 1930 (aged 70); Toronto, Ontario, Canada
- Known for: Painter
- Movement: Impressionism
- Spouse: Charles W.B. Lyall (m. 1915)

Laura Muntz Lyall RCA (June 18, 1860 – December 9, 1930) was a Canadian Impressionist painter, known for her sympathetic portrayal of women and children.

== Life and work ==
Laura Adeline Muntz was born at Royal Leamington Spa, Warwickshire, England in 1860, but her family emigrated to Canada when she was a child. She grew up on a farm in the Muskoka District of Ontario. As a young woman, Muntz's interest in art led to her take lessons in painting from William Charles Forster of Hamilton and to live and work at his school.

Starting in 1882, she began to take classes at the Ontario School of Art in Toronto where she studied with Lucius Richard O'Brien, and later with George Agnew Reid. She studied briefly at the South Kensington School of Art in 1887, then returned to Canada to continue her studies with Reid. In 1891, she embarked on a seven-year period of study in Paris, attending the renowned Académie Colarossi. Her preferred subject was children. From 1893 on, her handling of paint was Impressionist.

To stretch her limited financial resources, she gave private English lessons, and shared various apartments in Paris from 1893 to 1897 with another student-teacher at the Académie, the American painter, Wilhelmina Douglas Hawley (1860–1958). Hawley likely taught Muntz her watercolour and pastel technique, and they travelled together in 1893 to Rijsoord in the southern Netherlands where they painted.

Muntz's work, exhibited at the 1893 World's Columbian Exposition in Chicago, Illinois, as well as at various French exhibitions such as the Société des Artistes Français, resulted in her paintings being reproduced in periodicals such as L'Illustration, and reviewed in Toronto's Saturday Night, and in England's the Studio, and in many other magazines and newspapers which gave her increased prestige and successful sales. But, in 1895, while she was still in Paris, the unmarried Muntz was called home from a triumphant year abroad to look after an ailing relative. Upon her return, in 1896, the Académie Colarossi, in recognition of her diligence and talent, made her "massière" or studio head.

Muntz decided to return to Canada in 1898 and set up a studio in Toronto to teach and paint. In the decade at the beginning of the new century, she was said to be the artist with the greatest versatility among women painters because she painted such a wide variety of subjects. When, in 1906, she moved to Montreal to continue her career at 6 Beaver Hall Square, she reached a sizable new audience that regarded her as the premier Canadian portraitist of children.

Her work received recognition both in Canada and beyond. She received a silver medal at the 1901 Pan-American Exposition and was awarded a bronze medal at the 1904 Canadian exhibition at the Louisiana Purchase Exposition in St. Louis, Missouri. She showed 27 paintings with the Royal Canadian Academy of Arts between 1893 and 1929, and exhibited in yearly exhibitions at many other societies and associations. Her earlier submissions to shows were frequently compared and contrasted with that of her contemporary and friend Florence Carlyle, but in time, her work was applauded in its own right, especially for her sympathetic, lucid manner. Critics recognized that her work looked created by chance, but was the result of years of observation and work, as Le Canada wrote in 1903.

She was elected as an associate member of the Royal Canadian Academy of Arts in 1896, only the eighth woman to receive this honour. Muntz was a member of the Ontario Society of Artists starting in 1891; she was the first woman appointed to its Executive Council in 1899, serving until 1903. In 1909, she was invited to exhibit with the Canadian Art Club: she was the only woman so honoured by this group.

Following the death of her sister in 1915, she returned to Toronto and married her brother-in-law Charles W.B. Lyall to care for the children of her sister's marriage (there were 11 of them but only a few remained at home). She then set a studio up in the attic of their home, and started signing her works with her married name. In 1921, she travelled with her husband to Devon, England and there painted what was new scenery for her. Critics praise her handling of light and restrained though rich colour, proof that she could have been a major landscape painter if she chose.

In 1930, Muntz was ill and dying of Exophthalmic Goitre brought on partly by overwork and worry about the family responsibilities she had assumed fifteen years earlier. Despite these trying personal circumstances, she continued to paint until her death in 1930.

== Collections ==
Both the National Gallery of Canada and the Art Gallery of Ontario include her work in their holdings.

== Legacy ==
Laura Muntz Lyall is regarded today as an "example of achievement in a male-dominated field and as a champion of womanhood within the confines of an era". Her work The Watcher was included in 150 years 150 works, an on-line exhibition by Université du Québec à Montréal (UQAM) as representative of her era. Her painting A Daffodil was featured at the National Gallery of Canada in 2021. Her work was on view in the Gallery's exhibition Canada and Impressionism: New Horizons, which was shown in Ottawa from January to June 2022. In 2025, her Interesting Story was included in Reality & Reverie: Canadian and European Painting Beyond Impressionism, an exhibition at the Art Gallery of Ontario in Toronto, which concerned the ways artists gave form to interior thoughts on the part of their subjects.

== Paintings ==
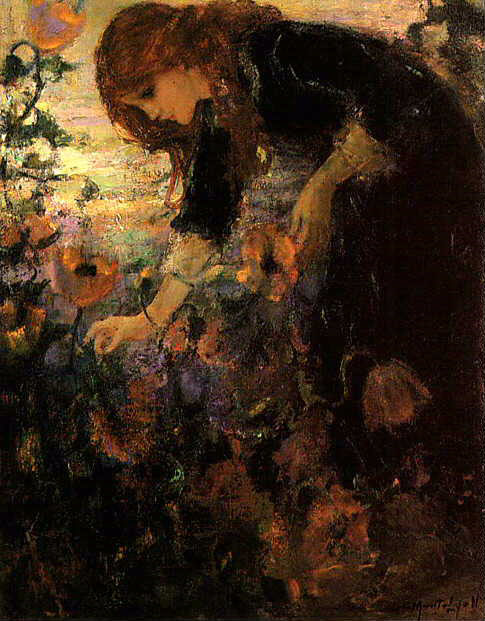
Oriental Poppies

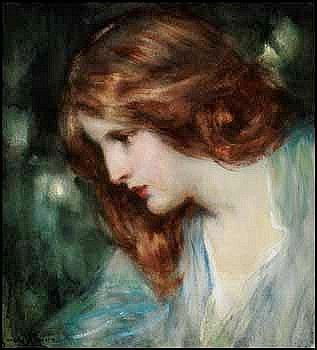
Portrait of a young woman

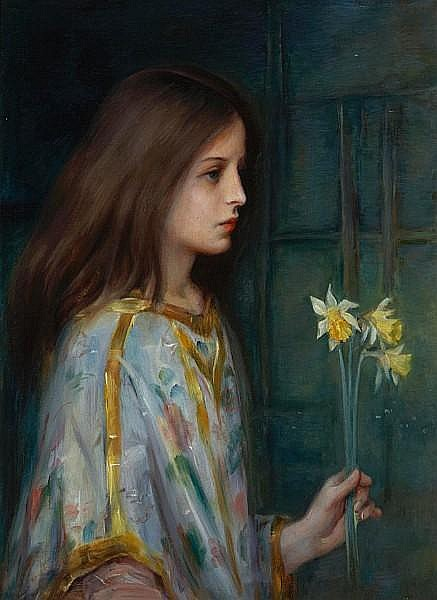
Young girl holding daffodils

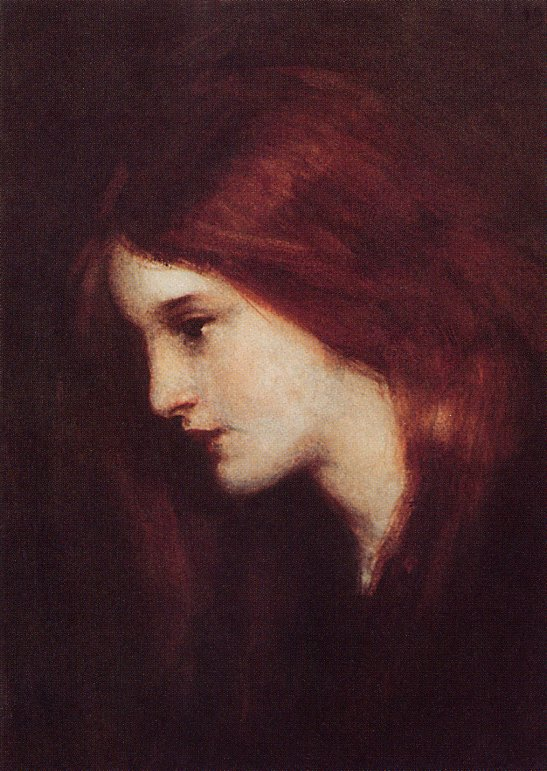
The Little Red Head

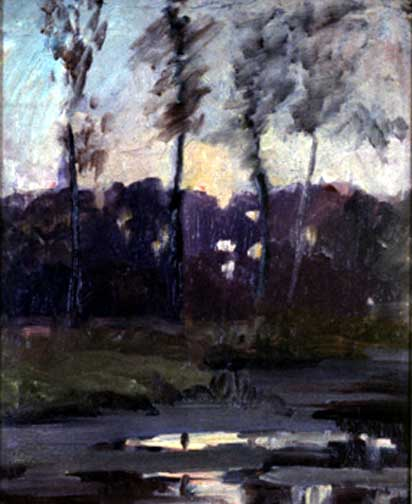
Trees by the river (1900)

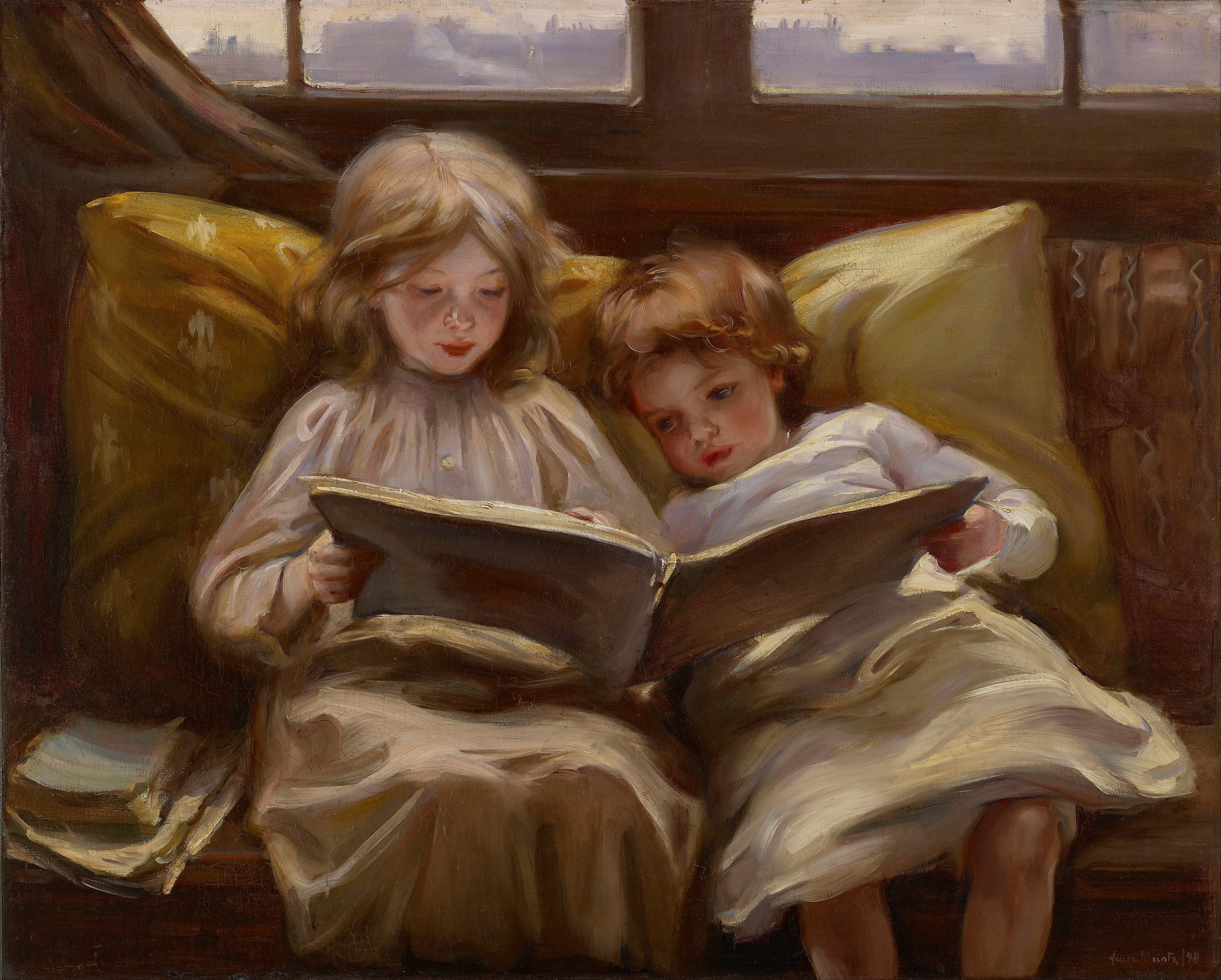
Interesting Story (1898)
