= Farncomb =

Farncomb may refer to:

== People ==
- Caroline Farncomb (1859-1951), Canadian artist
- Harold Farncomb (1899-1971), senior officer

== Others ==
- HMAS Farncomb, a submarine

== See also ==
- Farncombe
