= Frederick Challener =

Canadian artist (1869–1959)

Frederick Sproston Challener
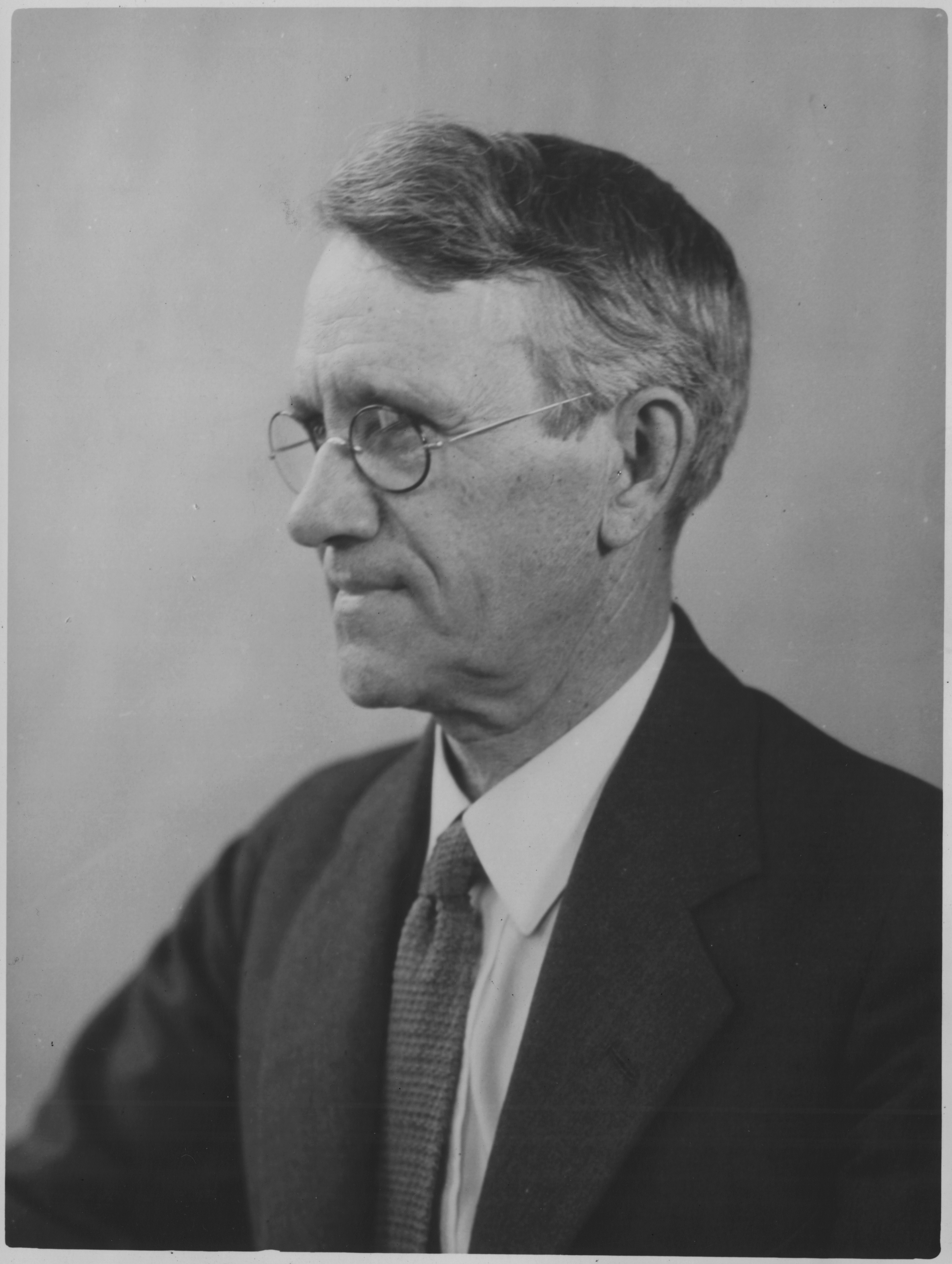
- Challener in 1930
- Born: Frederick Sproston Challener; July 7, 1869; Whetstone, Middlesex, England
- Died: September 30, 1959 (aged 90); Toronto, Ontario, Canada
- Other names: F.S. Challener; Frederick S. Challener
- Education: Central Ontario School of Art
- Occupations: Muralist, painter, draftsman, commercial artist, teacher
- Spouse: Ethel White (m. 1902)

Frederick Sproston Challener RCA (1869–1959), who signed his name as F.S. Challener, was a Canadian painter of murals as well as an easel painter of oils and watercolours and a draftsman in black-and-white and pastel. He also did illustrations for books and commercial art. He "easily ranks with the first few mural decorators in Canada", wrote Newton MacTavish, author of The Fine Arts in Canada (MacMillan, 1925).

== Biography ==
=== Early years ===
Challener was born in Whetstone, Middlesex, England. His family moved to Canada in 1870, but returned to England in 1876 where Frederick attended school, then came back to Canada permanently in 1883. He worked as an office boy for a business firm and drew individuals he saw from a window. Artist and photographer, John Arthur Fraser, of the Notman and Fraser firm, recognized his talent and paid for him to attend the Ontario School of Art at night (from 1884 to 1886). Afterwards, Challener studied at the Toronto Art Students' League (1885–1889) and privately with George Agnew Reid for some years from 1890 on while working for the Toronto Lithographing Company. Challener was a teenager when studying with Reid, but the two went on to become lifelong friends and colleagues. After five years there, he became a newspaper artist and worked as a full-time artist thereafter.

=== Career ===
Challener's first commission for a mural painting was for two ceiling panels for McConkey's restaurant in 1895, his second for the proscenium arch in the Russell Theatre, Ottawa (1897) for which he won a competition with his The Arts Paying Homage to the Drama (one of the roundels and the maquette were preserved in the collection of the National Gallery of Canada when the restaurant was demolished).

After travelling through Europe and the Middle East in 1898–1899, Challener began working as a muralist in earnest and participated in commissions such as the decoration of the recently completed Toronto City Hall. He created murals for hotels, such as Fort Rouillé in Toronto's King Edward Hotel (1900) and Winnipeg's Royal Alexandra Hotel (1906–1912) (the four surviving panels are in the Manitoba Archives); theatres, such as the Royal Alexandra Theatre in Toronto (1906); and office buildings and passenger boats such as the S.S. Kingston, the S.S. Toronto and the S.S. Montreal (1900–1902). For the Parkwood Estate, the family home of Colonel Robert Samuel McLaughlin, from 1924 to 1926, he painted three large murals for the Grand Hall of the residence as well as 14 paintings for McLaughlin's billiard room which showed the Colonel's life, his family and friends.

In painting murals, Challener was part of a chapter in Canadian Art called Decorative Painting based on William Morris's Arts and Crafts movement. In Canada, the Arts and Crafts Society of Canada was founded by George Agnew Reid and others in 1903. It became the Canadian Society of Applied Art in 1905, and combined with a City Beautiful movement to encourage murals in civic and commercial establishments. In Toronto, the Society of Mural Decorators was founded in 1897 by Reid, Challener, William Cruikshank and Edmund Wyly Grier. Many artists, both before and after the society was formed, executed murals, only Challener was one of the few who made a career of it. "He has produced some very clever and important decorations", wrote E. F. B. Johnston in 1914. (Johnston used "clever" in a positive sense. On the same page of text, he praised Challener as having "perhaps the keenest sense of light and brilliancy of colour of any of the Canadian painters").

In 1890, Challener became a member of the Ontario Society of Artists and he showed with the Society often from 1890 to 1951 and in the Canadian National Exhibition from about 1890 to 1947 as well as in many shows organized by the National Gallery of Canada and Art Gallery of Ontario. In 1891, Challener first exhibited with the Royal Canadian Academy of Arts and he showed with the academy almost every year thereafter until 1948. He was elected to full membership in 1899. The Montreal Gazette wrote of Challener on April 19 of that year that his work entitles him to a place among the foremost of Canadian artists since it is, in the main, "serious and sincere".

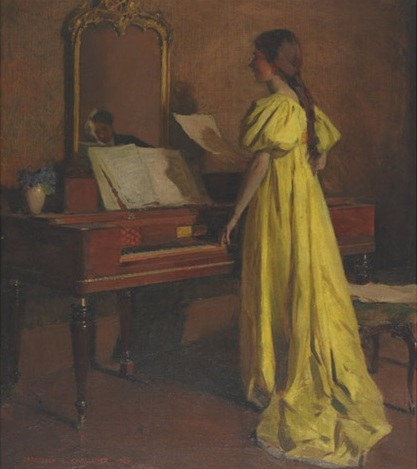
A Singing Lesson, 1900

In 1900, he showed A Singing Lesson (1900) at the Royal Canadian Academy of Arts (it was also shown in the Art Association of Montreal and in the Rochester Art Club Annual Exhibition in 1902). The model for the man in the mirror was Challener's close friend of his early years, Walter Allward, playing his cello.

A Singing Lesson was singled out for praise. In reviews published in 1900, the Ottawa Citizen wrote that the picture, "showing a young lady, clad in a yellow gown, standing before a piano, expressed, gracefully, an abundance of sentiment", while the Ottawa Evening Journal wrote that the painting was "fresh, daring, and finished" and called Challener "one of Canada’s most promising and original artists."

At the Pan-American Exposition of 1901 in Buffalo he was awarded a bronze medal and in 1904, he received a bronze medal at the Canadian exhibition at the Louisiana Purchase Exposition, informally known as the St. Louis World's Fair, at St. Louis, Missouri. He received the bronze medal at the Pan American Exhibition for his painting The Workers of the Fields which he deposited in the Royal Canadian Academy diploma collection in the National Gallery of Canada. He worked in Toronto, but moved to Conestoga near Waterloo, in 1907, to Winnipeg from 1913 to 1916, then back to Toronto.

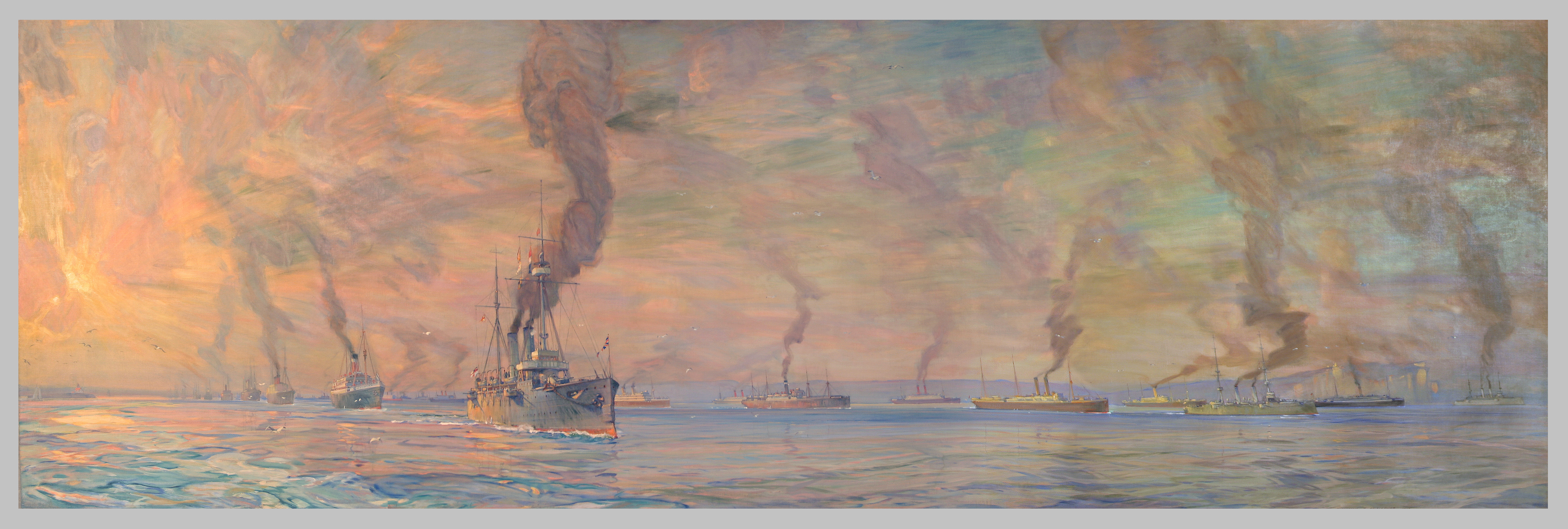
Canada's Grand Armada, 1918

During WWI, Challener worked as a painter for the Canadian War Memorials Department. His painting Canada's Grand Armada depicts the first contingent of the Canadian Expeditionary Force sailing from the Gaspé in Quebec to Britain in 1914. The painting is in the collection of the Canadian War Museum.

From 1921 to 1924, he taught at Central Technical School, Toronto, and from 1927 to 1952, he taught at the Ontario School of Art. During these years, he accumulated archival material on Canadian art which today is in the Edward P. Taylor Library & Archives of the Art Gallery of Ontario in Toronto.

Challener died in Toronto on September 30, 1959, at the age of 90.

== Selected public collections ==
Challener's paintings are in the collection of the National Gallery of Canada, Ottawa; the Art Gallery of Ontario, Toronto; the Government of Ontario Art Collection, Toronto; the MacKenzie Art Gallery, Regina; the Robert McLaughlin Gallery, Oshawa; and the Winnipeg Art Gallery.

== Memberships ==
OSA 1891; Toronto Arts Students League, 1890–1906; A.R.C.A. 1891; R.C.A., 1899; Palette Club, Toronto, about 1902; Founder member Arts and Letters Club, Toronto, 1908.

== Publications ==
- F. S. Challener, "Mural Decoration". Canadian Architect and Builder, vol. 17, no. 5 (May, 1904), pp. 90–92.
