= Wilhelmina Douglas Hawley =

American artist

- self portrait, 1897
- Born: July 13, 1860; Perth Amboy, New Jersey
- Died: February 8, 1958 (aged 97); Rijsoord, Netherlands
- Known for: Painting,
- Spouse: Bastiaan de Koning (m. 1901; died in 1954)

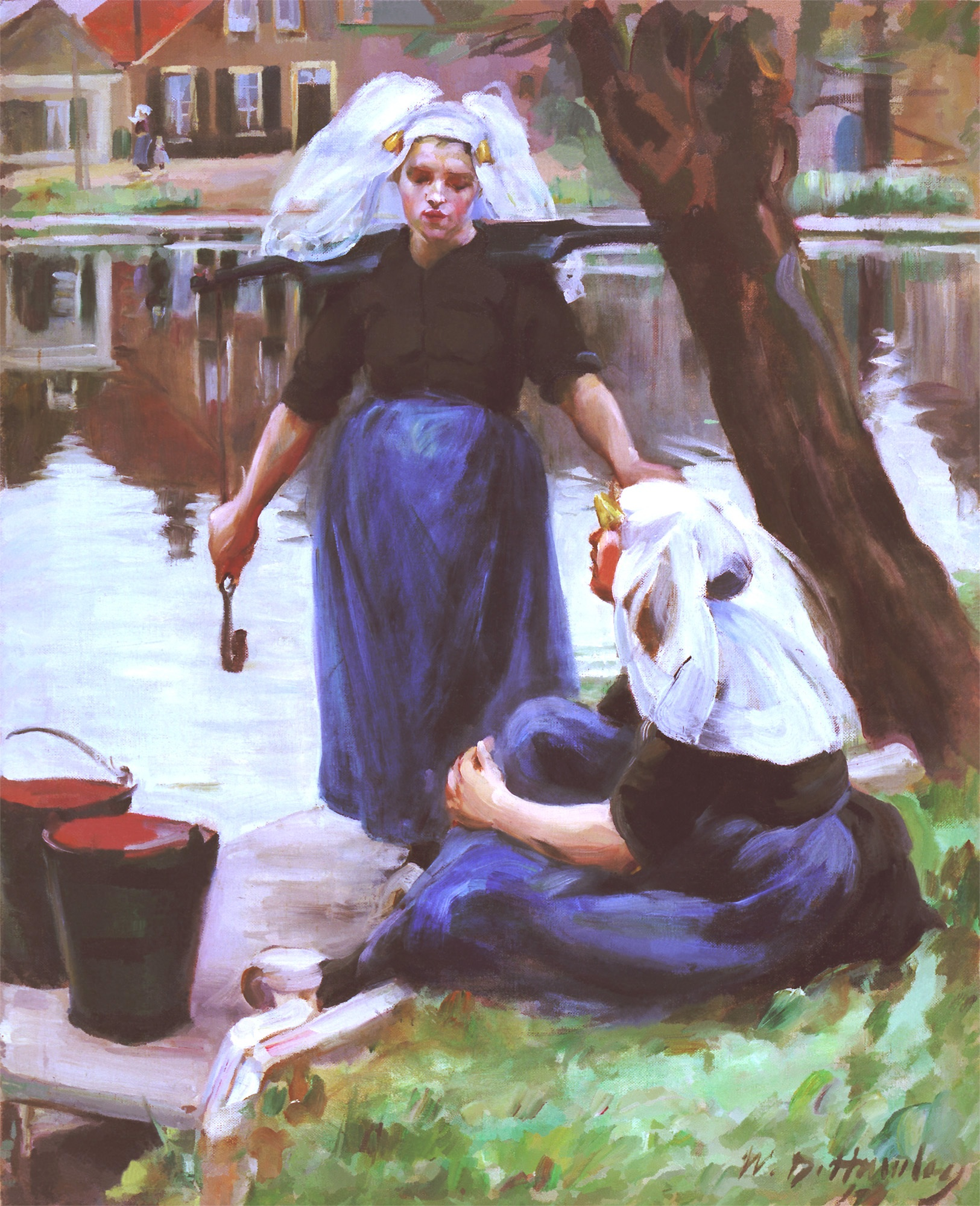
Twee vrouwen

Wilhelmina Douglas Hawley (1860-1958) was an American painter who emigrated to the Netherlands.

== Biography ==
Hawley was born in Perth Amboy, New Jersey on July 13, 1860. She studied at the Cooper Union Women's Art School and the Art Students League of New York. In 1892 she traveled to Paris where she studied at the Académie Julian and registered at the Académie Colarossi where she taught watercolour since 1893 as the first female teacher. In 1893, she and her friend Laura Muntz (later Lyall) traveled to Rijsoord, in the Netherlands. There she met Bastiaan de Koning (1868-1954) whom she married in 1901. The couple settled in Rijsoord.

Hawley exhibited work at the National Academy of Design, and the National Association of Women Painters and Sculptors, and the Paris Salon. She was a member of the National Association of Women Painters and Sculptors, the New York Watercolor Society, and the Woman's Art Club of New York She served on the board of the Art Students League of New York.

Hawley died on February 8, 1958, in Rijsoord, Netherlands.

Author: Alexandra van Dongen
