= Canadian exhibition at the Louisiana Purchase Exposition =

Canadian exhibition, 1904

The Canadian exhibition at the Louisiana Purchase Exposition was the country's contribution to what was commonly called the St. Louis World's Fair, held in St. Louis, Missouri, United States, in 1904. The exhibition included a showcase of Canadian natural resources and fine art.

== Background ==
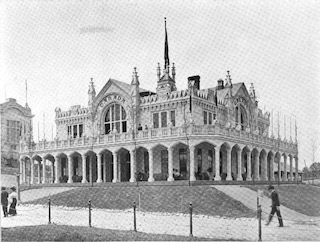
The Canadian pavilion, designed by Lawrence Fennings Taylor

The 1904 Louisiana Purchase Exposition in Missouri, United States was the largest exhibition held in the Western hemisphere to date. Canada was one of 62 nations invited to participate. The Canadian government erected a Canadian pavilion, spending more than $30,000 on the building and on beautifying the grounds. The official guide to the exhibition said the pavilion where Canada's forest, game and fruit wealth was exhibited was a spacious structure, said to be a clubhouse. The building was designed by Lawrence Fennings Taylor in a Gothic style.

Fine art from Canada was shown in another building, the Palace of Fine Arts (today the central part is the St. Louis Art Museum), in galleries 49 to 52 of its east pavilion, adjacent to Germany and Sweden's showrooms.

== Fine art ==
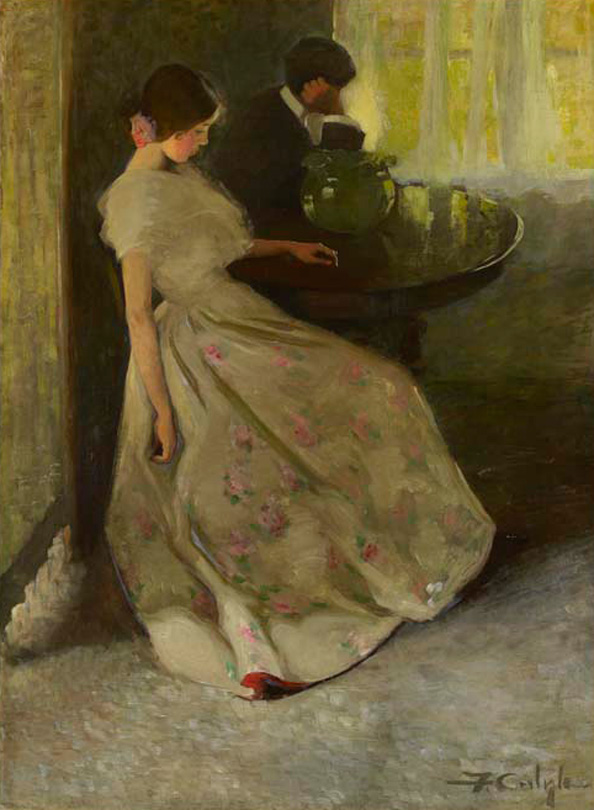
The Tiff (around 1902) by Florence Carlyle. Oil on canvas.

The art exhibition included 117 works by 51 Canadian artists (88 in oil, 29 in pencil and watercolour). Landscape, genre scenes and portraits predominated. (The full list is available online).

The Canadian exhibition was small but choice, wrote David R. Francis, the President of the exhibition in his three volume book on the Fair. As in previous exhibitions such as the World's Columbian Exposition in 1893, Canada was shown as an independent nation and not as part of Great Britain. On viewing it, Francis wrote that Canadian art was never represented better at any international exhibition, adding that it most closely resembled developments in the United States and praising many of the Canadian exhibitors, among them painters Florence Carlyle, Robert Harris, Edmond Dyonnet, Curtis Williamson, Laura Muntz (who also exhibited in 1893 at the World's Columbian Exposition), and F.M. McGillivray Knowles. He also praised the show's conservatism. The St. Louis Republic, in 1904, called it a "very credible display". It wrote that the hanging was effective and in good taste and added, "it has been said of the collection that no better work was shown for its size by any other country". It also praised the fact that there were quite a few distinctively Canadian subjects.

The Dominion government had left the selection of paintings entirely in the hands of the Royal Canadian Academy (RCA), which upheld traditional values and academic training in art. The Academy chose works from the annual RCA show that year which had an unusually good selection, artists having been encouraged to put their best, not only their latest works, Established artists were selected as, for instance, Robert Ford Gagen, one of the Canadian Fine Arts Commissioners, who exhibited a watercolour of a seascape, but relative newcomers also were included, such as Mary E. Wrinch who showed a case of miniature paintings on ivory.

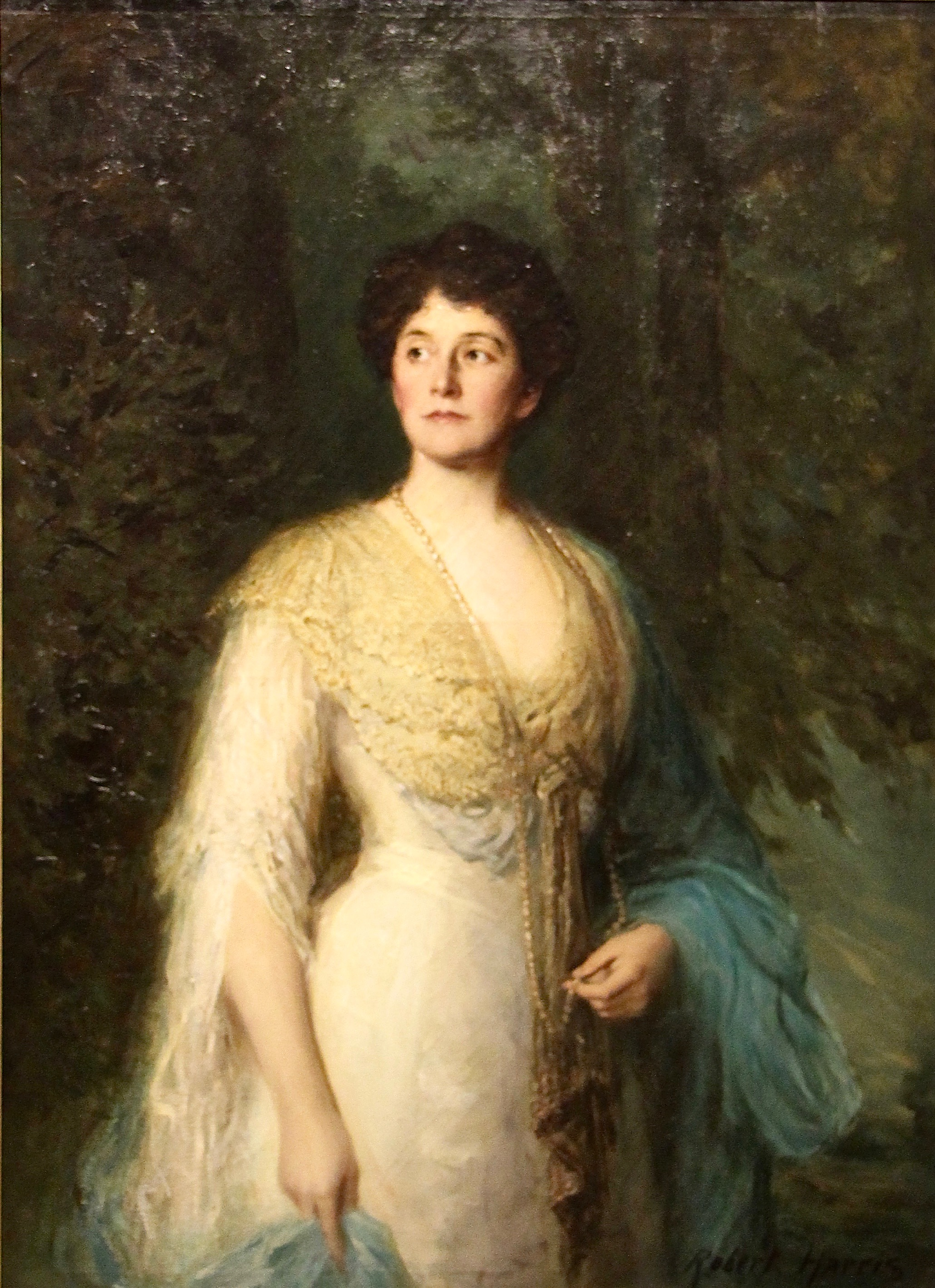
The Countess of Minto (1903) by Robert Harris. Oil on canvas.

The installation in St. Louis was done by distinguished Academicians, Robert Harris, the Academy President; long-term member, E. Wyly Grier; and seventy-year-old F. M. Bell-Smith, the Academy Secretary. At the Fair, they were met with surprises, among them the news that they had to decorate and furnish the four Canadian galleries, line and paint the walls which were covered with burlap and brocaded cloth, and paint a frieze at the top. The walls, as in the international and British sections, were coloured a strong red with light grey, white and gold in the frieze.

In the handbook of the exhibition, three artists were singled out for illustration: Harris (Countess of Minto), Homer Watson (The Flood Gate) and F. M. McGillivray Knowles (Landing the Catch). Knowles's painting was said to form a delightful colour harmony and Watson was described as a dramatic, colourful, vigorous painter. Taken as a whole, the exhibit reflected credit on such a young country, one critic wrote.

A number of artists received awards from the exposition. The Commemorative Diploma and Gold Medal of Honour for Distinguished Service in Art was given to Harris; silver medals were given William Brymner, Florence Carlyle, Edmond Dyonnet, and Curtis Williamson, and bronze medals to F. S. Challener, Maurice Cullen, Clarence Gagnon, John Hammond, William Hope, F.M. McGillivray Knowles, Laura Muntz, G.A. Reid, Sydney Strickland Tully, and Homer Watson.

In Harris's report on the exhibition to the Royal Canadian Academy, he said the facts spoke for themselves: at Chicago in 1893, five medals were given Canadian artists; at St. Louis, 15 were awarded. Harris's correspondence with Halsey C. Ives, Chief of the Art Exhibition, can be found in the St. Louis Art Museum Archives, St. Louis World's Fair Correspondence. His letters home about the Fair are in the Robert Harris collection in the Confederation Centre Art Gallery, Charlottetown.

The artists in the show are still of relevance today. In 2020, the Art Gallery of Ontario exhibited Mary E. Wrinch's miniature portraits in a show titled "Mary Wrinch: Painted from Life". In 2023 Sophie Pemberton whose painting A Livre Ouvert (1900), a large painting of two young women sitting together in conversation over a book, was in the show (No. 63), had a major exhibition at the Art Gallery of Greater Victoria. The show, titled Unexpected: The Life and Work of Sophie Pemberton, Canadian Artist, included this painting among the 70 art works on view.
