= Mary E. Wrinch =

Canadian painter (1877–1969)

Mary Evelyn Wrinch
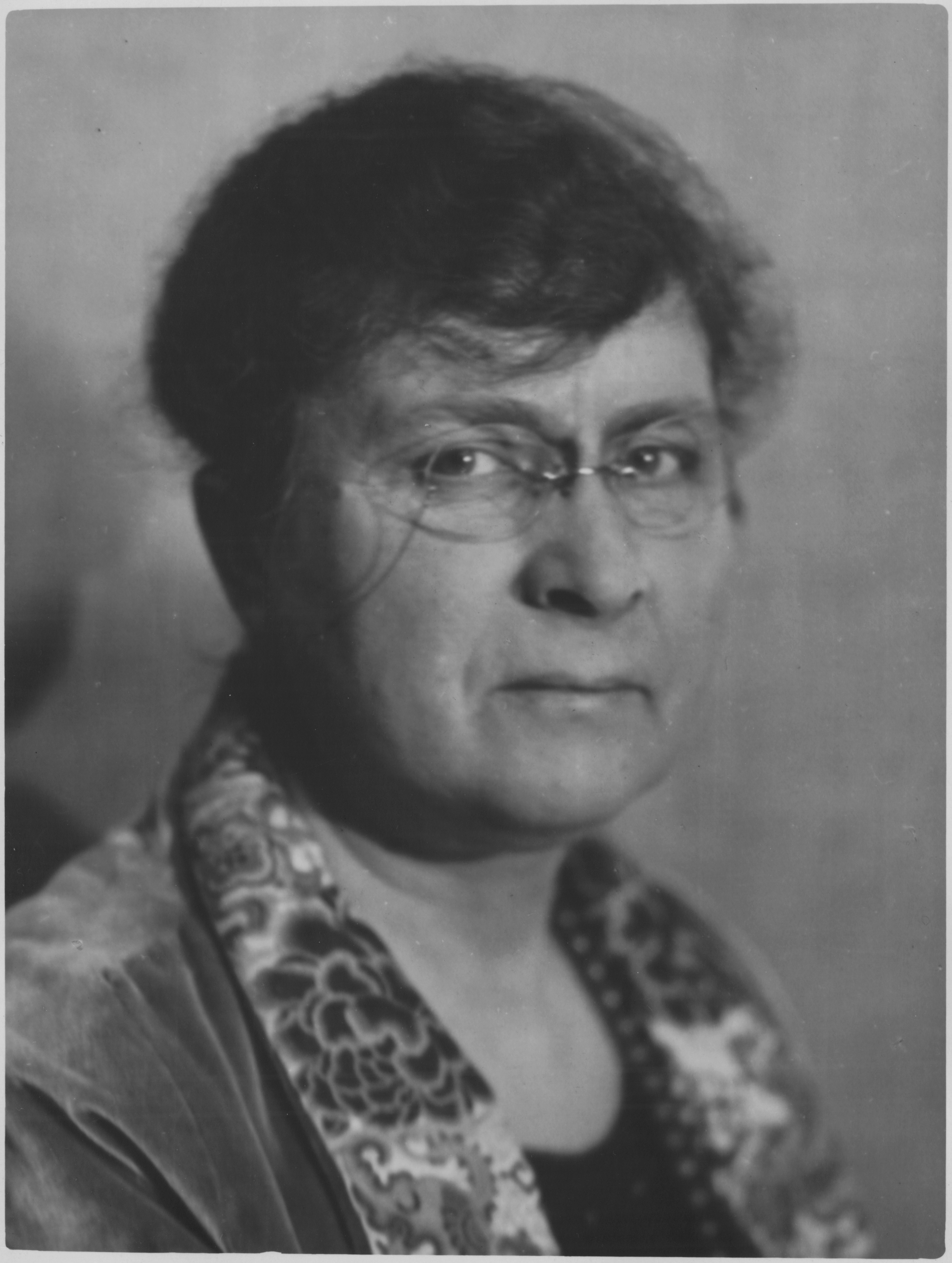
- Born: 1877; Kirby-le-Soken, United Kingdom
- Died: 1969 (aged 90–91); Toronto, Canada
- Known for: Painter, Graphic artist, teacher
- Spouse: George Agnew Reid (m. 1922)

Mary Evelyn Wrinch who signed her name M. E. Wrinch (1877–1969), was a Canadian artist who created miniature paintings, oil paintings, and block prints, sometimes inspired by the Northern Ontario landscape. Emulated by the Group of Seven, she pioneered the 'Canadian style', painting landscapes with bold colours of the Algoma, Muskoka and Lake Superior regions, in situ. In her miniature paintings on ivory, she depicted her sitters with freshness and vitality. Her colour block prints are virtuoso examples of the medium.

== Early life ==
Wrinch was born in 1877 in Kirby-le-Soken, Essex in England to her parents, Leonard and Elizabeth Cooper Wrinch. Upon her father's death, she emigrated at the age of eight with her mother to Bronte, Ontario, and after a trip back to England, in 1889, relocated to Toronto, Ontario.

In Toronto, she attended Bishop Strachan School, a private school in the Forest Hill area, in 1889. In the 1890s, Wrinch studied with George Agnew Reid (whom she married in 1922) along with artists Laura Muntz and Robert Holmes at the Central Ontario School of Art. Wrinch attended the School (now known as OCAD University) from 1889 to 1893, studying both printmaking and painting. She went through numerous degrees, and began graduate studies at the Grosvenor School of Modern Art in London until 1899 under the direction of Walter Donne. Wrinch later returned to Toronto where she again studied at the Ontario College of Art & Design with Lyall, Holmes and Reid. She later took part in two private studies, one in London, England with Alyn Williams, and another in New York under Alice Beckington, before joining the Art Students’ League in New York.

== Career ==
Wrinch was first a painter of miniatures on ivory in Toronto and then, around 1906, turned to the landscape of Muskoka and painted a sketch of a distant sawmill on a lake (Art Gallery of Ontario) there during a visit to Kathleen Lizars, an author and friend. Back in Toronto, she painted a larger canvas, Saw Mill, Muskoka (Art Gallery of Ontario). She continued painting landscape, but turned to the colour linoleum print, around 1928. She served as the Art Director at Bishop Strachan School (BSS) from 1901 to 1936. While holding this position, she designed the school's chapel interior, including a large stained-glass window.

Throughout her career in education and art, Wrinch was a member of many artist organizations. She was made an Associate member of the Royal Canadian Academy of Arts, and actively worked with the Ontario Society of Artists, a professional artists association advocating for visual arts in Ontario through exhibitions and special projects. Wrinch also was a member of the Heliconian Club and the Women's Art Association of Canada, which are two non-profit associations that connect and promote women's participation in the arts. Besides these groups, Wrinch was a member of the Canadian Society of Painters in Watercolour, American Society of Miniature Painters, Canadian Handicrafts Guild and Canadian Society of Graphic Art.

Wrinch's showed at many of the important exhibitions of her day, including the 1924 British Empire Exhibition at Wembley, London; and A Century of Canadian Art in 1938 at the Tate Gallery, London, as well as annual exhibitions of the Ontario Society of Artists from 1910 to 1937. Her first commercial exhibition was at The Art Metropole (241 Yonge Street) in 1966. It was curated by former curator and dealer Jerrold Morris and included 50 of Wrinch's works alongside 50 of Mary Heister Reid’s works. Wrinch’s first public exhibition was in 1969 at the Art Gallery of Ontario (AGO) and was curated by Joan Murray.

Muriel Miller originally wrote on the artist's life and career in 1940. Curator Joan Murray wrote, "Mary Wrinch: Canadian Artist," in the journal, Canadian Antiques Collector, in 1969. This essay remains as the most significant and comprehensive writing on Wrinch's art along with Chris Dickman's essay in The Prints of Mary Wrinch along with the article by Catharine Mastin in 2012.

In 1925 and the years that followed, Wrinch frequently sketched with her husband, George Agnew Reid, in Algoma, Temagami, Bruce Peninsula and the Ottawa Valley. She ended her artistic career in 1944.

In 2020, the Art Gallery of Ontario exhibited her miniature portraits and landscape prints in a show titled Mary Wrinch: Painted from Life.

== Artwork ==
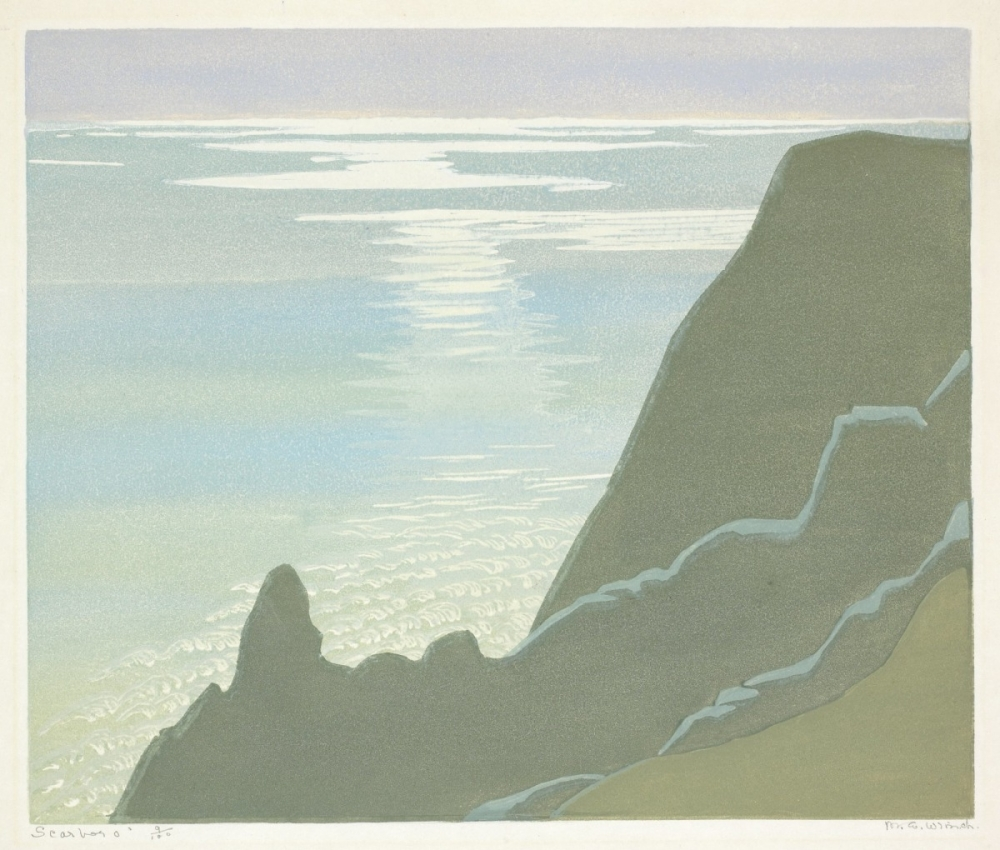
Mary E. Wrinch Scarboro' c. 1935–1938 Print colour linocut on wove paper 31.5 x 28.6 cm; block: 25.6 x 26 cm

Wrinch worked in many artistic mediums including oil paint, watercolour, drawing and printmaking. She is best known for her linoleum block style prints. Wrinch's earliest use of black and white linoleum block prints was in 1928. By 1930, she introduced colour to her prints by using linocut. Landscapes of Northern Ontario and florals are her most common print subjects. Her two most well-known works are Breaking Clouds (1931–1932) and Scarboro (1935–1938). Both works are colour linocut on wove paper and are found in the Canadian Prints and Drawings section of the National Gallery of Canada.

Her paintings are in the collections of the Art Gallery of Ontario, Museum London in Ontario, the Montreal Museum of Fine Arts, the National Gallery of Canada and the Robert McLaughlin Gallery, among others.

Curators praise the innovations, "distinct vision" and the "high-key colours and open brushwork" of her paintings. They believe her work stands up to the best work done in Canada at the time.

== Personal life ==
In 1922, Wrinch married George Agnew Reid, a Toronto-based painter and architect who was her teacher at the Central Ontario School of Art. Wrinch was friends with Mary Hiester Reid (1854–1921), George Agnew Reid's first wife. Mary died in 1921, but told Wrinch that should George express interest, she gave her blessing for the two to be together. Reid and Wrinch were married a year after Mary Hiester Reid's passing. Wrinch and Reid lived together in the Wychwood Park area, known as an arts and crafts community because it was founded by created in 1888 as a private residential enclave for artists and businessmen by landscape artist Marmaduke Matthews. After 25 years of marriage to Wrinch, George Agnew Reid died in 1947. Wrinch died in Toronto in 1969 at age 90.

== Record sale prices ==
At the Cowley Abbott Auction, Important Canadian Art (Sale 1), December 1, 2022, Lot #35, French Canadian Cottage (1926), oil on board, 10 x 12 ins (25.4 x 30.5 cms), Auction Estimate: $4,000.00 - $6,000.00, realized a price of $14,400.00.

== See also ==
- Group of Seven (artists)
- George Reid
