= Edmond Dyonnet =

Canadian painter (1859-1954)

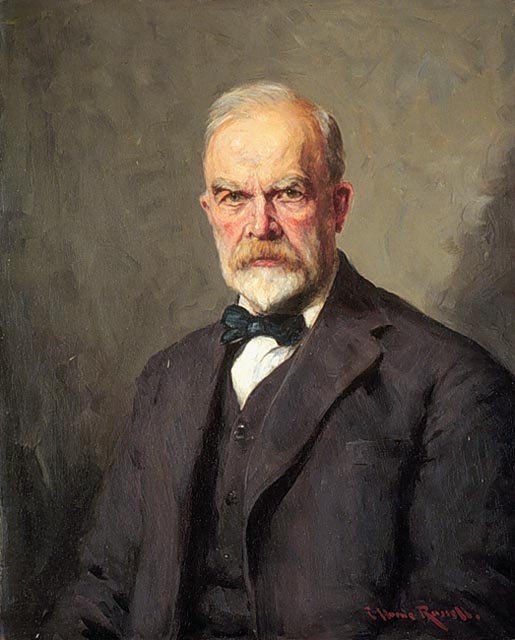
- Edmond Dyonnet by Georges Horne Russell in 1920
- Born: June 25, 1859; Crest, Drôme, France
- Died: July 7, 1954 (aged 95); Montreal, Canada
- Known for: Painter, Photographer, educator

Edmond Dyonnet RCA (1859–1954) was a landscape painter, portraitist, photographer and educator. He was born in France and became a naturalised Canadian. He taught numerous students in Quebec, among them A. Y. Jackson, and was an academician and secretary of the Royal Canadian Academy of Arts (1910–1947), author of a history of the Royal Canadian Academy of Arts with Hugh Jones in 1934, and a charter member of Montreal's Arts Club in 1912.

== Biography ==
He was born on 25 June 1859 in Crest, Drôme, France, to Ulysses-Alexandre Dyonnet, industrialist, and Goullioud Albine. The real family name is Guyonnet de Pivat but due to an error of births during the French Revolution, the surname became Dyonnet. Edmond died in Montreal on 7 July 1954, at age 95. He was buried with his family in the cemetery of Notre-Dame-des-Neiges, in Montreal.

Edmond had two younger sisters, Emma Dyonnet, wife Lorin (1866–1947) and Clémence Dyonnet, wife Chabot (18? –1905). Ulysses, the father of Edmond, had an older brother Leon Dyonnet Goullioud who married Helen, the sister of Albine. Leon Dyonnet made a fortune in corsets for women in association with Amyot from 1886 to 1891 and set up the Dominion Corset company, rue de la Couronne in Quebec City. The couple had a daughter artist, cousin of Edmond Dyonnet: Eugénie Dyonnet, who emigrated to Canada in 1872 and died in 1875 in Montreal.

At 9 years old, Edmond Dyonnet followed his father and emigrated to Italy, he continued his primary education in Turin, from 1868 to 1873, in municipal schools and then returned to France with his family in the Drôme. He studied at Crest high school from 1873 to 1875. His father Ulysses met in Paris the brother of Judge George Baby who convinced him to emigrate to Quebec.

On 16 May 1875, the family emigrated to Canada. In 1882, Dyonnet moved to Labelle, Quebec in the Laurentian mountains. The village was founded by Father Antoine Labelle. Ulysses Dyonnet was a pioneer; he cleared land and resumed two mills, a sawmill and a flour mill. The timber industry was thriving. Using the north Rouge River (Quebec) for transportation of the wood, it was then sawed at the family business in Labelle, located near the Iroquois Falls. The trade was intense and the family expanded.

The young Edmond stayed in Montreal, where he studied drawing at the National Institute of Fine Arts from 1875 to 1881. One of his teachers was Abbé Joseph Chabert (1831–1894). In 1882, he returned to Italy and studied painting at the Accademia Albertina in Turin with Andrea Gastaldi and Pier Celestino Gilardi. After Turin, he did a complete tour of Italy and then went to Naples in 1883 and to Rome at the Villa Medici in 1884.

When he returned to Canada in 1890, Dyonnet settled in Montreal and taught in the school founded by Abbé Joseph Chabert. In 1899, he went to paint in the Gaspé, in the Laurentians and in Berthier-sur-Mer. Not much is known about his personal life. Edmond Dyonnet never married and had no children. At the turn of the century, he supported his sister Emma, widow of Ernest Lorin who died in February 1899. His father Ulysses died the following year in 1900. Edmond raised his three nephews and nieces, Alice Lorin (1886–1907), Gabrielle Lorin (1897–1985) and Louis Gustave Lorin (1898–1956). Dyonnet was interested in many things and never stopped reading books. The nonagenarian was said to go outside daily, only prevented by the worst of the winter storms in Montreal. At his death, his niece Gabrielle Lorin inherited and donated all the archives in 1967 to the University of Ottawa.

== Activities ==
Edmond Dyonnet was famous as a landscape painter and portraitist, especially among the wealthy and cultivated citizens of Montreal. Judges, doctors, and community leaders all ordered their portraits. He was one of the founders of the School of Fine Arts with Alfred Laliberté and Marc-Aurèle de Foy Suzor-Coté. He taught there from 1922 to 1925, and also became professor of drawing at the Ecole Polytechnique de Montréal, at the Conseil des Arts et Métiers of Quebec, and at McGill University (1920–1936).

He trained thousands of students including Narcisse Poirier, Clarence Gagnon, Thomas Garside, Alexander Young Jackson, Marc-Aurèle Fortin and Jack Bush. He never tolerated mediocrity, nor half finished work. He frequently used to say "Rub it out and do it over again."

He was a member of the Art Association of Montreal. In 1893 he became a member of the Royal Canadian Academy of Arts and became its Secretary from 1910 to 1947. He was also a member of the Pen and Pencil Club, and a member of the Arts Club. He lived a long time in Montreal at 1207 Bleury Street.

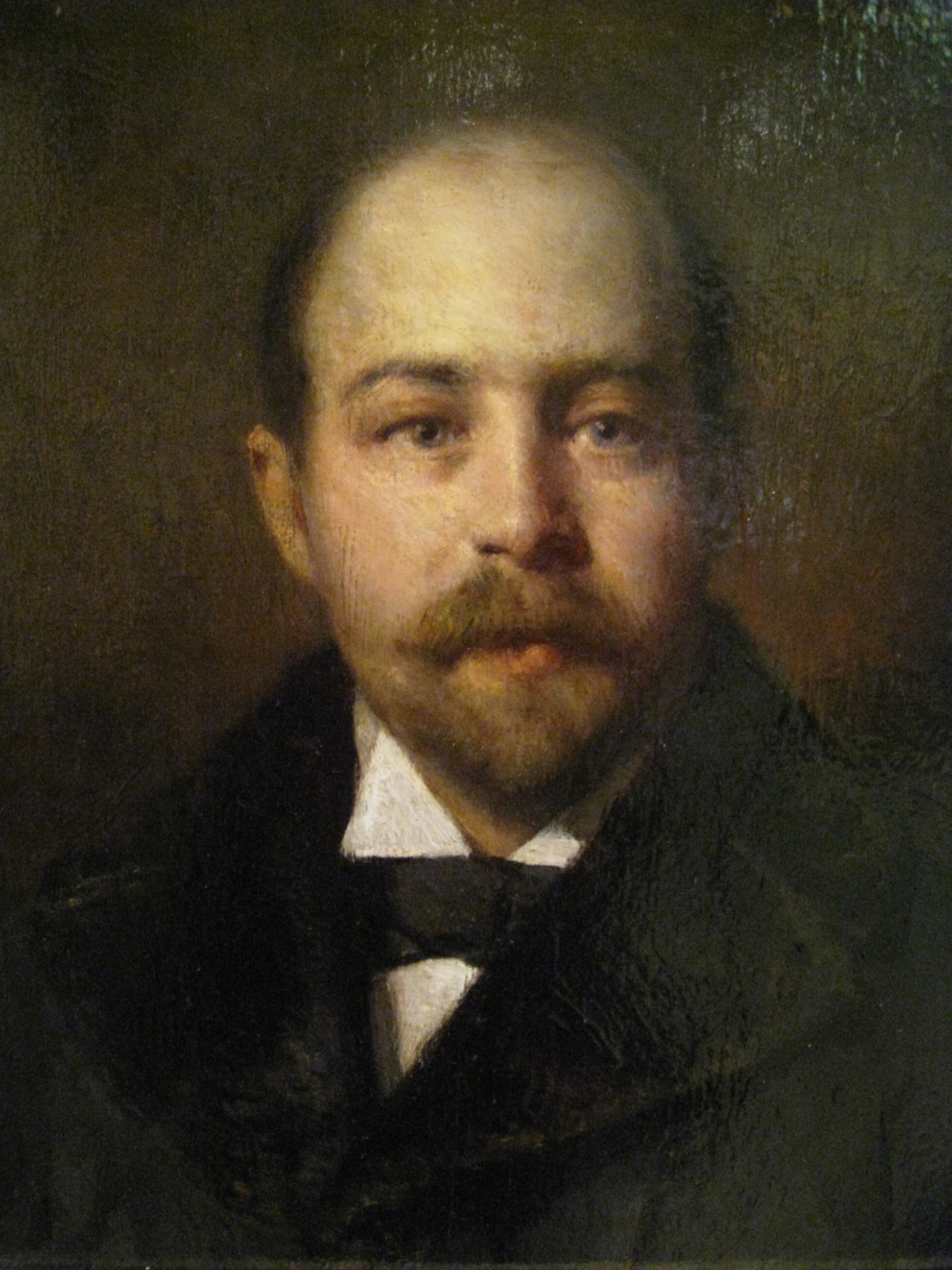
Dr Rodolphe Boulet by Edmond Dyonnet 1901,Musée nat des beaux-arts du Québec

Although he was French by birth, he didn't want to stay only in the French-Canadian community so he learned and spoke perfect English. His reputation expanded in the English-speaking environment. Most of his friends were on the English side. He never painted religious paintings, although Quebec was very influenced by Catholicism.

Dyonnet's work is varied and numerous, distributed in many private collections and museums. There is yet no inventory of his work. He preferred the portraits to landscapes. His inspirations were Nicolas Poussin and Claude Gellée (also known under the name Le Lorrain), two great painters of the seventeenth century. He never really appreciated Impressionism and criticized Vincent van Gogh at the end of his life.

He received a silver medal at the Buffalo exposition in 1901 and also at the Canadian exhibition at the Louisiana Purchase Exposition in 1904. France made him an Officier d'académie Ordre des Palmes Académiques in 1910.

In 1968, the University of Ottawa published his autobiography, Memoirs of a Canadian artist.

== Works in museums ==
Several Canadian museums own his paintings and drawings. In Montréal they can be seen in the Montreal Museum of Fine Arts, the Musée national des beaux-arts du Québec and in the collection of the Power Corporation of Canada. In Ottawa the National Gallery of Art and the Canadian War Museum both own works by Dyonnet. In Toronto (Ontario) his works can be seen in the Art Gallery of Ontario, as well as in Kingston, Ontario at the Agnes Etherington Art Centre, and in Victoria (British Columbia) in the Art Gallery of Greater Victoria.

== See also ==
- List of Canadian painters
- Charles Ignace Adélard Gill
- George Horne Russell
