= Caroline Farncomb =

Canadian artist (1859-1951)

- Born: January 12, 1859; Clarke Township near Newcastle, Canada West
- Died: November 13, 1951 (aged 92); London, Ontario
- Known for: painter

Caroline Farncomb (January 12, 1859 – November 13, 1951) was a Canadian painter. She lived in London, Ontario where she was secretary of the Women's Art Association and donated work to start an art gallery, today the Museum London.

== Career ==
Farncomb was born near Newcastle, Canada West and moved to London, Ontario with her family in 1867. She studied in London with Cleménce Van Den Broeck and Florence Carlyle; at the Hellmuth Ladies College, London, Ontario; the Western School of Art and Design, London, Ontario; at the Art Student's League, New York and Académie Julian, Paris.

She exhibited her paintings with the Western Art Fair; the Women's Art Association of Canada; the Women's Art Club of London; with the Art Association of Montreal (1900–1909): the Royal Canadian Academy of Arts (1899–1908); and the Ontario Society of Artists (1899–1909) (she was elected a member in 1908), among other exhibition societies and places. In 1908, she showed her work in a group show at W. Scott and Sons Galleries, Toronto. She continued to show her work in various local venues until 1932. Farncomb died in London, Ontario in 1951. Her work is in the collections of the Art Gallery of Ontario Mcintosh Gallery, Western University, the Mississauga Museums, and Museum London.

== Gallery ==
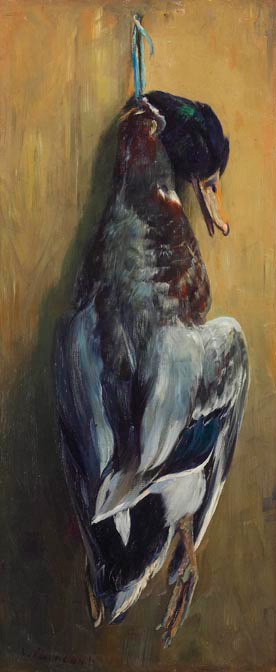
Wild Duck, 1901
