= George Agnew Reid =

Canadian painter (1860-1947)

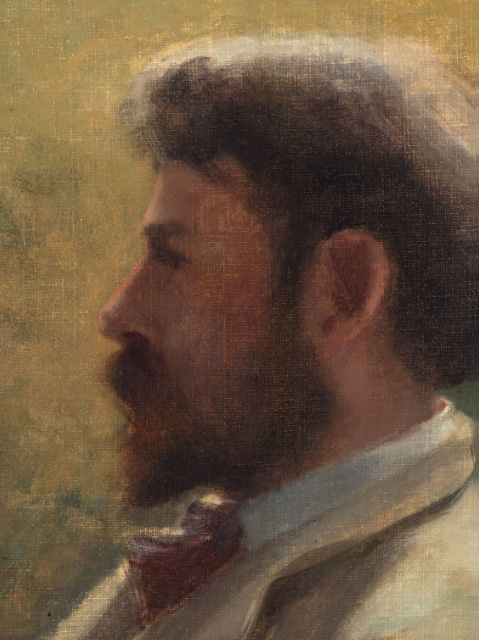
- Portrait of George Agnew Reid by Mary Hiester Reid, 1895
- Born: July 25, 1860; Wingham, Canada West
- Died: August 23, 1947 (aged 87); Toronto, Ontario, Canada
- Education: Ontario School of Art (1879–82); Pennsylvania Academy of the Fine Arts, Philadelphia (1882–85); Académie Julian and Académie Colarossi, Paris (1888–1889)
- Known for: genre painter
- Spouse(s): Mary Hiester Reid (m. 1885); Mary E. Wrinch (m. 1922)

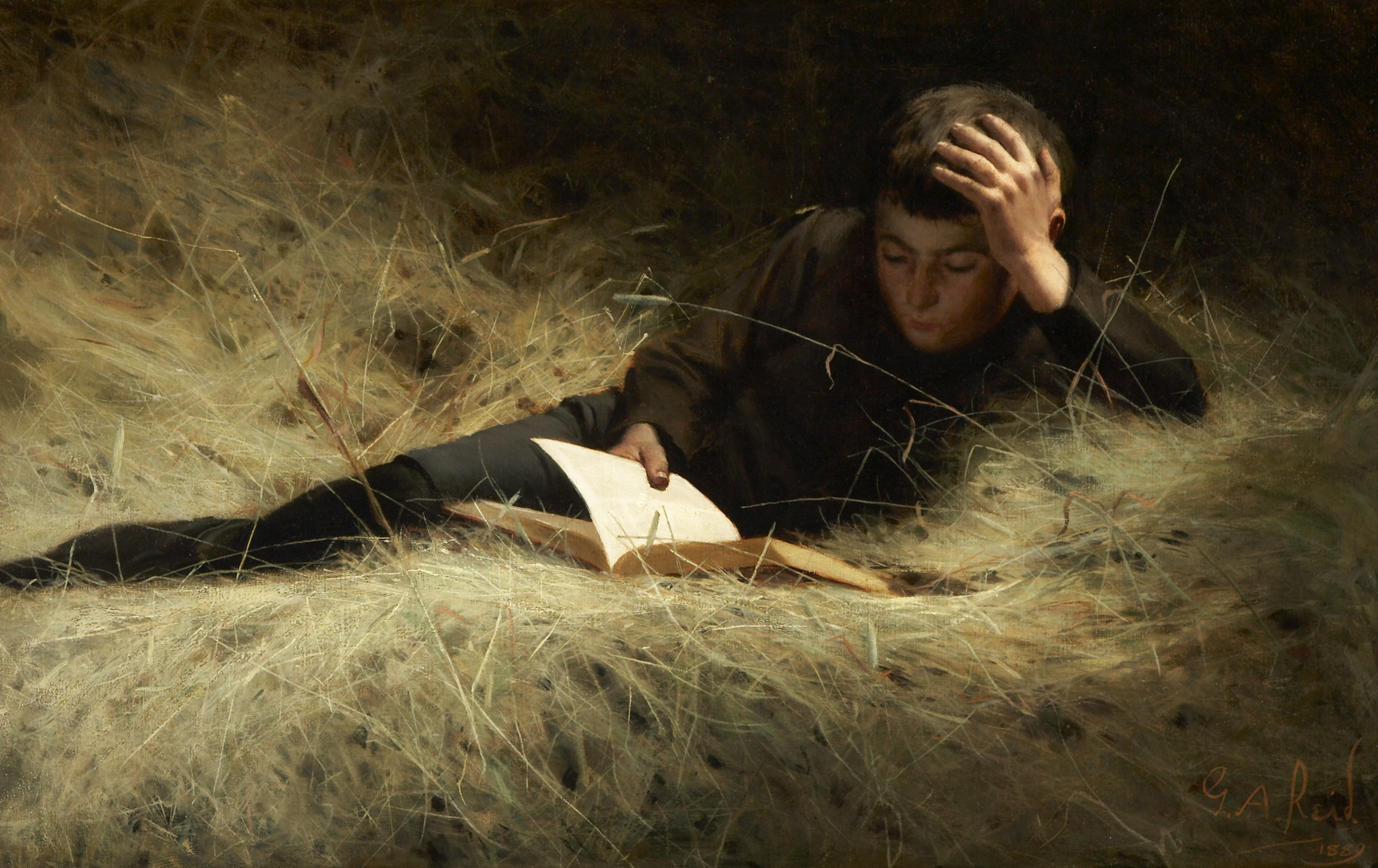
Forbidden Fruit, George A. Reid, 1889.

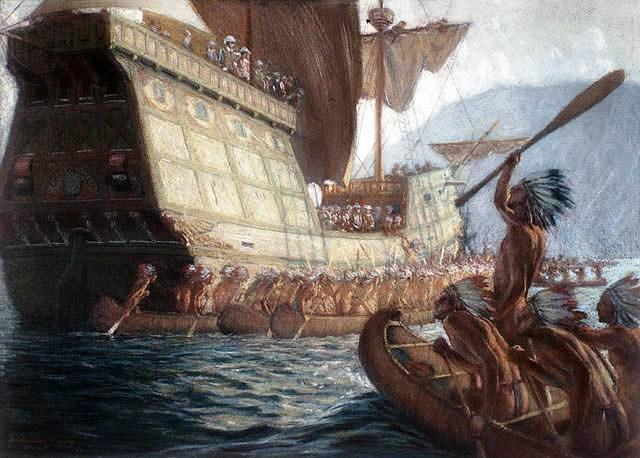
Samuel de Champlain arrive à Québec, George Agnew Reid, 1909

George Agnew Reid RCA who signed his name as G. A. Reid (July 25, 1860 – August 23, 1947) was a Canadian artist, architect, and educator. He is best known as a genre painter, but he was also a successful muralist, arts organizer, and champion of the applied arts.

== Early life ==
George Agnew Reid was born on his family's farm in Wingham, East Wawanosh Township, Huron County, Ontario. Growing up, Reid would study illustrated books and magazines, and by age eleven, he announced he intended to be an artist. After briefly apprenticing with an architect, he was trained at the Ontario School of Art, Toronto in 1879, where he studied with Robert Harris. Afterwards, he studied at the Pennsylvania Academy of the Fine Arts from 1882 to 1885 where he was a protégé of Thomas Eakins who appointed him a demonstrator in anatomy classes.

Reid met his first wife, artist Mary Hiester Reid, at the Pennsylvania Academy where they both studied. The two were married in May 1885, and were together until her death in 1921. Shortly after their marriage, the Reids moved to downtown Toronto, where George taught art lessons and began work on some of his most well-known paintings of rural Ontario. Throughout his early career, Reid also studied at the Académie Julian, with Jean-Joseph Benjamin-Constant, and at the Académie Colarossi in Paris, and the Prado in Madrid (1888–1889). He and his wife made a number of trips to Europe to study art and architecture, visiting countries including France, Italy, Spain and Portugal.

== Work ==
In Toronto, Reid used memories of his early days on the farm and his knowledge of life in Canada in Forbidden Fruit (1889). He made his name with narrative pictures to which he applied his training in Paris which included works such as The Foreclosure of the Mortgage (1893; destroyed in 1919). After a 1896 trip to Spain and France, he painted or used pastel to create scenes of Canadian nature or of the figure in nature, espousing a modified form of Impressionism, having studied it in Paris.

Reid became interested in mural painting in Paris, created his first mural panel in 1892, and in 1896, on his trip abroad, studied the murals of Puvis de Chavannes. In 1897, with Frederick Challener, William Cruikshank and Edmund Wyly Grier, he founded the Society of Mural Decorators in Toronto. In 1903, with the help of others, he founded the Arts and Crafts Society of Canada. It became the Canadian Society of Applied Art in 1905, and combined with a "City Beautiful" movement to encourage murals in civic and commercial establishments. Reid created murals and private and public commissions notably for the Toronto City Hall (1897–1899), Toronto Municipal Buildings (c. 1899), the Royal Ontario Museum (1935–1938) and for Jarvis Collegiate in Toronto (1926–1929).

== Career, memberships, honours ==
Reid showed in the Salon des Beaux-Arts exhibition, with work such as the 48" x 66" oil painting Lullaby (shown in 1892).

He was elected to the Royal Canadian Academy of Arts in 1889, was President of the Ontario Society of Artists in 1897, President of the Royal Canadian Academy from 1906 to 1909, one of the founders of the Associated Watercolour Painters in 1912, and having taught at the Central Ontario School of Art since 1890, became the first principal of its successor, the Ontario College of Art from 1912 to 1929.

He was commissioned by the Canadian War Records department to create works in 1917 and 1918. His awards included a 1893 gold medal for Foreclosure of the Mortgage at the World's Columbian Exposition in Chicago (a second gold medal was awarded the picture in San Francisco at the Midwinter Fair in 1894), and a bronze medal at the Canadian exhibition at the Louisiana Purchase Exposition in St. Louis, Missouri in 1904.

== Later life ==
In 1922, after the death of his first wife Mary Hiester Reid, he married fellow artist Mary E. Wrinch. With her, he explored and painted the Canadian north in 1925 and the years that followed. He died in 1947, leaving behind a large and varied body of work, with much of it being found in public collections, such as the National Gallery of Canada. He donated 400 of his own works to the province for distribution to schools to inspire students. 175 of his works remain in the Government of Ontario art collection today.

== Legacy ==
Reid has been designated as an Historic Person in the Directory of Federal Heritage Designations.

== Record sale prices ==
At the Cowley Abbott Auction, Important Canadian Art (Sale 2), December 1, 2022, lot #130, Idling, oil on canvas (1892), 18 x 16 ins (45.7 x 40.6 cms), Auction Estimate: $8,000.00 - $12,000.00, realized a price of $108,000.00.

At the Cowley Abbott Auction of An Important Private Collection of Canadian Art – Part III, December 6, 2023, Lot #153, Reid's Toronto Waterfront, 1886, oil on canvas, 24 x 36 ins ( 61 x 91.4 cms ), Auction Estimate: $70,000.00 - $90,000.00, realized a price of $216,000.00.

== Architectural work ==
In 1892, George Agnew Reid and Mary Hiester Reid built two cottages from Reid's design at the artist colony in Onteora in Tannersville, New York. These led to further commissions at Onteora, including a church. The second cottage near their studio cottage served as a dormitory and studio for students which they taught, beginning in 1894.

Cultural offices
| Preceded by Robert Harris | President of the Royal Canadian Academy of Arts; 1906-1909 | Succeeded by William Brymner |
