= Narcisse Poirier =

Canadian artist (1883–1984)

Narcisse Poirier (March 19, 1883 – April 3, 1984) was a Quebec artist.

Poirier was born in Saint-Félix-de-Valois, Quebec and moved to Montreal, where he studied at the Monument-National. He continued his studies in art at the Académie Julian in Paris. In 1922, one of Poirier's works, La vieille maison d’Henri IV was purchased by the Quebec government. His paintings were shown at the Royal Canadian Academy and later at the Montreal Museum of Fine Arts and he participated in a number of shows with the sculptor Alfred Laliberté. In 1932, his work Le temps des sucres received first prize at a show at the Montreal Museum of Fine Arts.

Poirier painted a number of religious paintings which can be found in churches at Saint-Félix-de-Valois, Saint-Eustache, Montreal and Rivière-du-Loup. His landscapes, painted in a traditional style, usually take as their theme the countryside of Quebec.

In 1975, Poirier exhibited works at the Canadian embassy in Washington, D.C.
