= Florence Carlyle =

Canadian painter

- Florence Carlyle, c. 1890.
- Born: September 24, 1864; Galt, Canada West
- Died: May 2, 1923 (aged 58); Crowborough, England
- Known for: Painter
- Partner: Juliet Hastings

Florence Emily Carlyle (September 24, 1864 – May 2, 1923) was a Canadian figure and portrait painter, known especially for her handling of light and fabric. Her work is included in the collection of the National Gallery of Canada.

== Childhood ==
Florence Carlyle was born September 24, 1864, in Galt, Canada West, to Emily Youmans Carlyle and William Carlyle. The second eldest of seven children, Florence was known throughout her life as "Bird" by family and friends. In 1871, the Carlyle family moved to Woodstock, Ontario, where her father, William Carlyle, worked as the county inspector of schools for Oxford County. While living in Woodstock, Emily created an art studio for local children who were interested in developing their artistic skills under the guidance of hired artists. Sensing her daughter's artistic talent, Emily arranged for Florence to have private drawing and painting lessons with William Lees Judson. William Carlyle's uncle (and Florence's great-uncle) was the Scottish historian and philosopher Thomas Carlyle; and William was said by a contemporary writer to have inherited "much of the cleverness and the abstraction" of his celebrated forebear.

== Early adulthood ==
In 1883, Florence and her younger sister, Lilian, exhibited several of their works at the Ladies' Department of the Toronto Industrial Exhibition. It was this exhibition that gave Florence widespread recognition as Princess Louise and her husband, the Marquis of Lorne purchased one of her paintings of white lilies on china. This event was heavily covered by The Globe, Daily Mail, and Woodstock's paper at the time.

== Education while in Paris ==
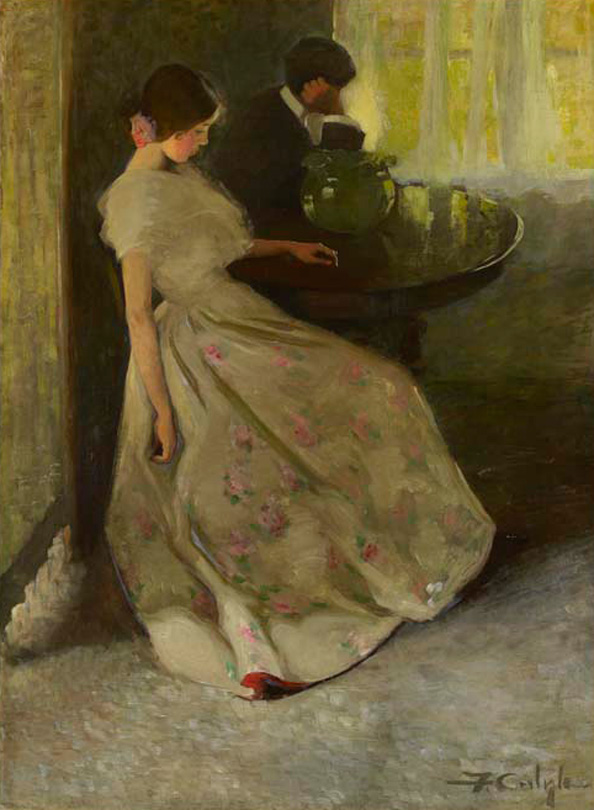
The Tiff (around 1902), oil on canvas, from the Art Gallery of Ontario collection.

After realizing that she needed to go abroad to further develop her artistic skill, 26-year-old Carlyle moved to Paris, France November 3, 1890. Carlyle journeyed to Paris with her artistic mentor, Paul Peel, his sister Margaret Peel, and their father John Peel. However, once in Paris she rented a flat on her own. Upon first arriving in Paris, Carlyle found it difficult to find an artistic academy that admitted women and furthermore, did not segregate men and women in classes. At first Carlyle attended the Académie Julian, but after a disagreement with Adolphe-William Bouguereau, she switched to the less prestigious Académie Delécluse. By 1892, Carlyle would return to Académie Julian to finish her studies. In 1893, she exhibited her painting Une Dame Hollandaise at the Salon of the Société des Artistes Français, where it "received favourable attention. Carlyle returned to Woodstock, where her family still resided in 1896.

== Later years ==
She had studios in London and Woodstock, and in 1897 became the first woman to be elected an Associate of the Royal Canadian Academy. In 1899, she established a studio in New York City. In 1904, her oil painting The Tiff was selected to appear in the Canadian exhibition at the Louisiana Purchase Exposition, where it won a silver medal. The Montreal Gazette described this painting (now in the permanent collection of the Art Gallery of Ontario) as "a strong piece of work depicting a lover's quarrel", and praised its execution as "clear cut and decisive."

The last twenty years of her life were spent in Crowborough, Sussex, England, where she and her partner, Juliet Hastings, bought an English cottage they called "Sweet Haws".

Carlyle died of stomach cancer at Crowborough in the spring of 1923. Most of her work is in the collection of the Woodstock Art Gallery in Woodstock, Ontario (55 works).

== Record sale prices ==
"Spring Song", a major oil on canvas depicting a woman in a room interior playing the piano, was sold by auction at Gardner Galleries in 2009, London, Ontario for $115,000.

== Publications ==
- Florence Caryle, "Student Life in Paris". Sentinel-Review (Woodstock), 10 February 1936.

== Legacy ==
Carlyle was given a retrospective by the Woodstock Art Gallery and Museum London in 2004 titled Florence Caryle: Against All Odds. Her work also was included in The Artist Herself, an exhibition co-curated by Alicia Boutilier and Tobi Bruce who also co-edited the book/catalogue.
